= List of Catholic bishops of Australia =

This is a historical list of all bishops of the Catholic Church whose sees were within the present-day boundaries of Australia, with links to the bishops who consecrated them. It also includes Australian bishops who were ordained for sees outside of Australia.

The number references the sequence of consecration. "Diocese" refers to the diocese over which the bishop presided or, if he did not preside, the diocese in which he served as coadjutor bishop or auxiliary bishop. The Roman numeral before the diocese name represents where in the sequence that bishop falls; e.g., the fourth bishop of Sydney is written "IV Sydney". Where a diocese is in bold type it indicates that the bishop is the current bishop of that diocese. Titular sees are not listed. Under consecrators are the numbers (or letters) referencing previous bishops on the list. The number listed first represents the principal consecrator. If a series of letters is under "Consecrators", then the consecrators were bishops from outside the Australia (the list of foreign sees is at the bottom of the page). Where the letter "F" is used, it indicates that a priest who was not a bishop assisted in the consecration.

== Chart of episcopal succession ==
- (†) Saint
- (#) Venerable
- (¤) Servant of God
- (*) Cardinal
- (‡) Current Diocesan bishop
- (&) Current Coadjutor bishop
- Current Auxiliary bishop
- (°) Nuncio to Australia

=== 1-50 ===
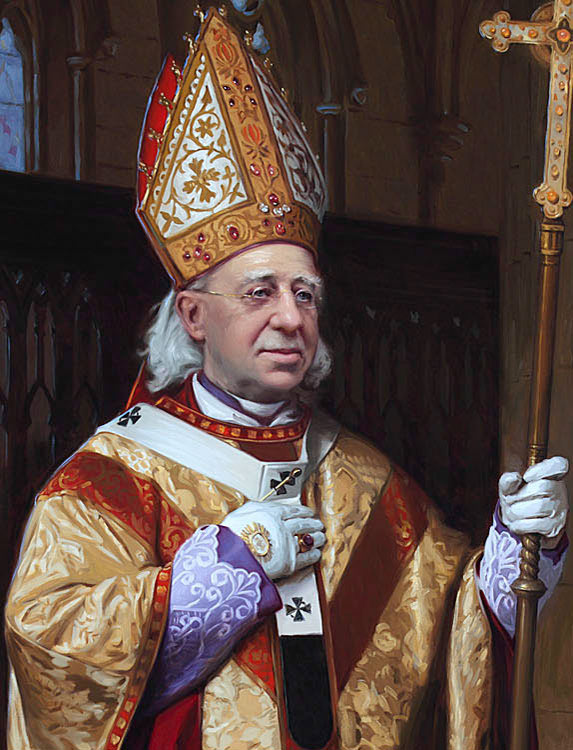
John Bede Polding (1) became the first Australian bishop in 1834.

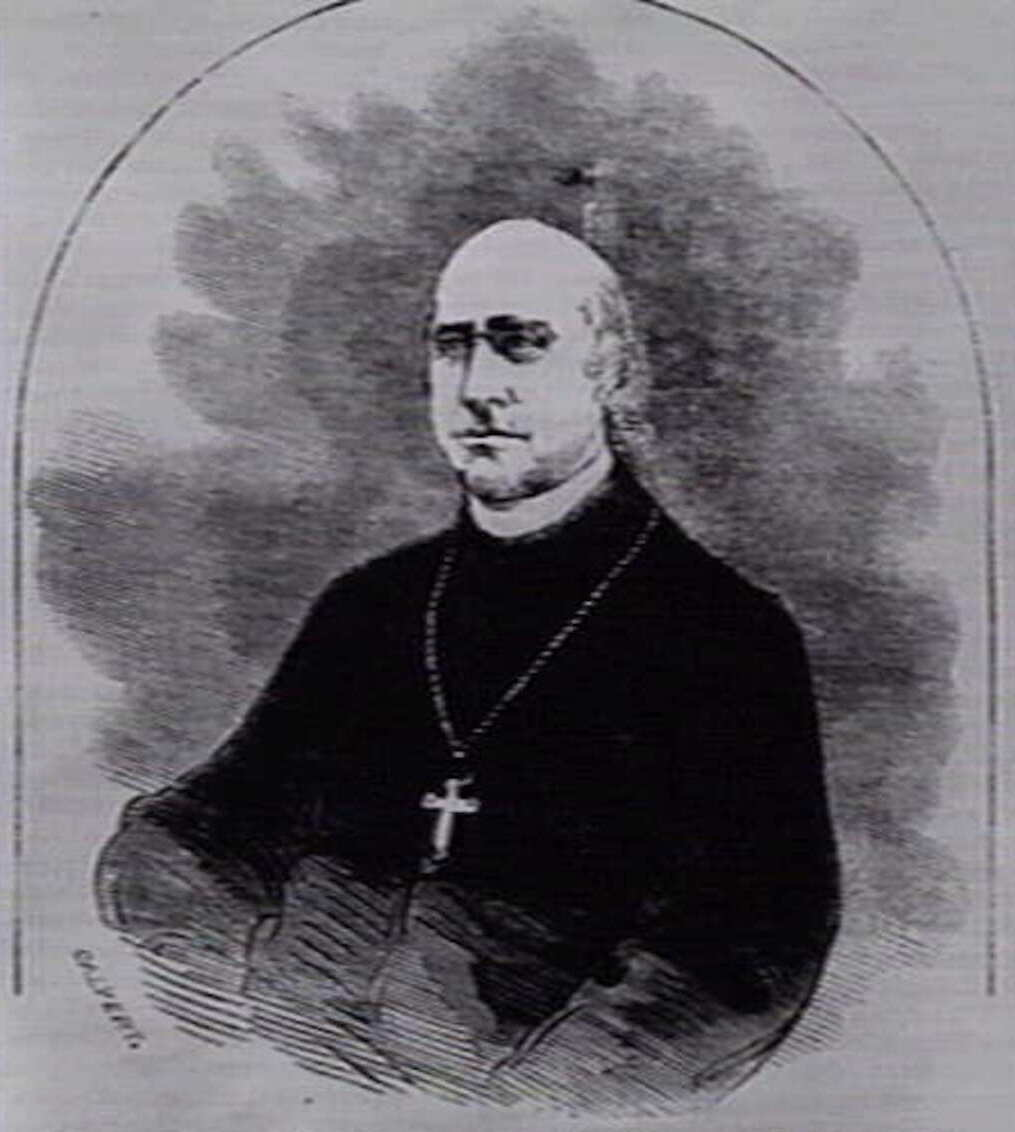
Robert William Willson (2) was the second Bishop in Australia.

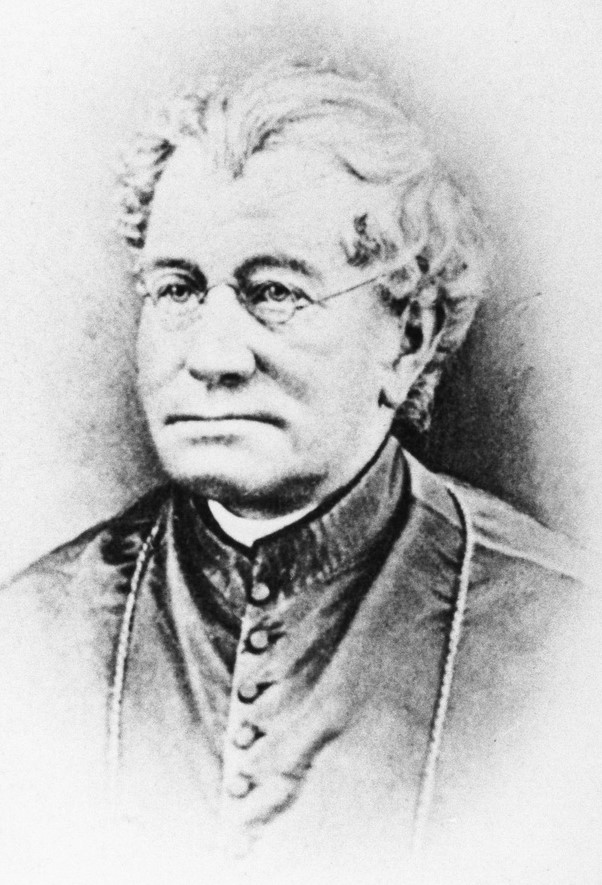
Francis Murphy (3) was the first Bishop of Adelaide and the first Bishop consecrated in Australia.

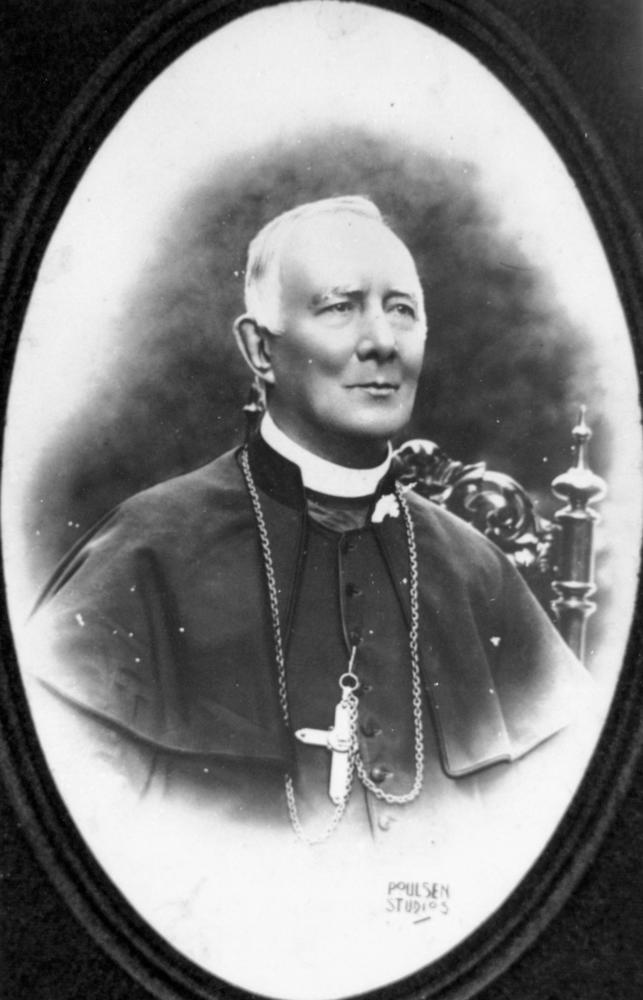
Patrick Francis Moran (26) was the first cardinal appointed from Australia.

No.	Bishop	Order	Consecrators	Year	Diocese
1	John Bede Polding	O.S.B.	AA1 AB1 AC1	1834	I Sydney
2	Robert William Willson		1 AD1 AE1	1842	I Hobart
3	Francis Murphy		1 2 F1 (Note: Fr John McEncroe) (Note: Although three bishops are typically required for ordination, the Pope may issue a dispensation when co-consecrators are unavailable. See Canon 1014.)	1844	I Adelaide
4	John Brady		AF1 AG1 AH1	1845	I Perth
5	James Alipius Goold	O.E.S.A.	1 2 3	1848	I Melbourne
6	Charles Henry Davis	O.S.B.	AI1 AH1 AE1	1848	I Maitland
7	Joseph Serra y Juliá	O.S.B.	AF1 AK1 AL1	1848	I Victoria, Perth (coadjutor)
8	Rudesindo Salvado	O.S.B.	AF1 AM1 AN1	1849	II Victoria
9	James Quinn		AO1 5 AP1	1859	I Brisbane
10	Patrick Bonaventure Geoghegan	O.F.M. Ref.	1 2 5	1859	II Adelaide, Goulburn (Note: Never took formal possession of the Diocese.)
11	James Murray		AQ1 AP1 13	1865	II Maitland
12	Matthew Quinn		AQ1 AP1 13	1865	I Bathurst
13	Daniel Murphy		AR1 AS1 AT1	1846 (Note: Appointed Coadjutor Vicar Apostolic of Madras, India. Appointed to Hobart in 1865.)	II Hobart (Note: First as Bishop. Raised to Archbishop in 1888.)
14	Laurence Bonaventure Sheil	O.F.M. Ref.	5 13 AU1	1866	III Adelaide
15	William Lanigan		9 12 11	1867	I Goulburn
16	Thomas Timothy O'Mahony		AR2 AP1 AV1	1869	I Armidale
17	Martín Griver y Cuní		AQ1 5 AW1	1870	II Perth
18	Roger William Bede Vaughan	O.S.B.	AX1 AY1 AZ1	1873	II Sydney
19	Christopher Augustine Reynolds		1 13 12 11	1873	IV Adelaide
20	Michael O'Connor		BA1 BB1 5	1874	I Ballarat
21	Martin Crane	O.E.S.A.	AQ1 BC1 26	1874	I Sandhurst
22	Elzear Aloysius Torreggiani	O.F.M. Cap.	BD1 BE1 BF1	1879	II Armidale
23	John Cani		18 11 15	1882	I Rockhampton
24	Robert Dunne		18 11 15	1882	II Brisbane
25	James Moore		5 19 13	1884	II Ballarat
26	Patrick Francis Moran		AQ1 BG1 BC1	1872 (Note: Appointed Coadjutor Bishop of Ossory. Appointed to Sydney in 1884.)	III Sydney
27	Stephen Reville	O.E.S.A.	5 25 F2 (Note: Fr John Fitzpatrick, Vicar General of Melbourne)	1885	II Sandhurst
28	Joseph Patrick Byrne		11 15 22	1885	II Bathurst
29	Matthew Gibney		26 8 19	1887	III Perth
30	Thomas Joseph Carr		AK2 BH1 BH2	1883 (Note: Appointed Bishop of Galway and Kilmacduagh. Installed in Melbourne in 1887.)	I Melbourne, I Military
31	John Dunne		26 15 11	1887	I Wilcannia
32	James Francis Corbett		30 13 25	1887	I Sale
33	Jeremiah Joseph Doyle		26 11 22	1887	I Lismore (Note: Name changed from Diocese of Grafton in 1900.)
34	John Hutchinson	O.E.S.A.	26 11 15	1887	I Cooktown (Vicariate Apostolic)
35	John O’Reilly		AP1 11 33	1888	I Port Augusta, V Adelaide
36	Joseph Higgins		AQ2 BJ1 BK1	1889	Sydney (Auxiliary), II Rockhampton, III Ballarat
37	Patrick Delany		30 25 27	1893	III Hobart
38	John Gallagher		26 11 15	1895	II Goulburn
39	James Maher		32 25 27	1896	II Port Augusta
40	Patrick Vincent Dwyer		26 11 28	1897	III Maitland
41	James Dominic Murray	O.E.S.A.	32 27 F3 (Note: Fr Silvestre Barry, Vicar General of Sandhurst)	1898	II Cooktown (Vicariate Apostolic)
42	William Bernard Kelly		32 39 31	1898	I Geraldton
43	Michael Kelly		AF2 BL1 BM1	1901	IV Sydney
44	John Mary Dunne		26 33 38	1901	III Bathurst
45	Patrick Joseph O'Connor		26 33 40	1903	III Armidale
46	James Duhig		43 40 41	1905	III Brisbane
47	John Henry Norton		43 31 40	1906	II Port Augusta
48	John Joseph Carroll		26 40 45	1910	II Lismore
49	Fulgentius Antonio Torres	O.S.B.	BN1 BO1 BP1	1910	Kimberley (Apostolic Administrator)
50	Patrick Joseph Clune	C.Ss.R.	NZ1 26 37	1911	IV Perth

=== 51-100 ===
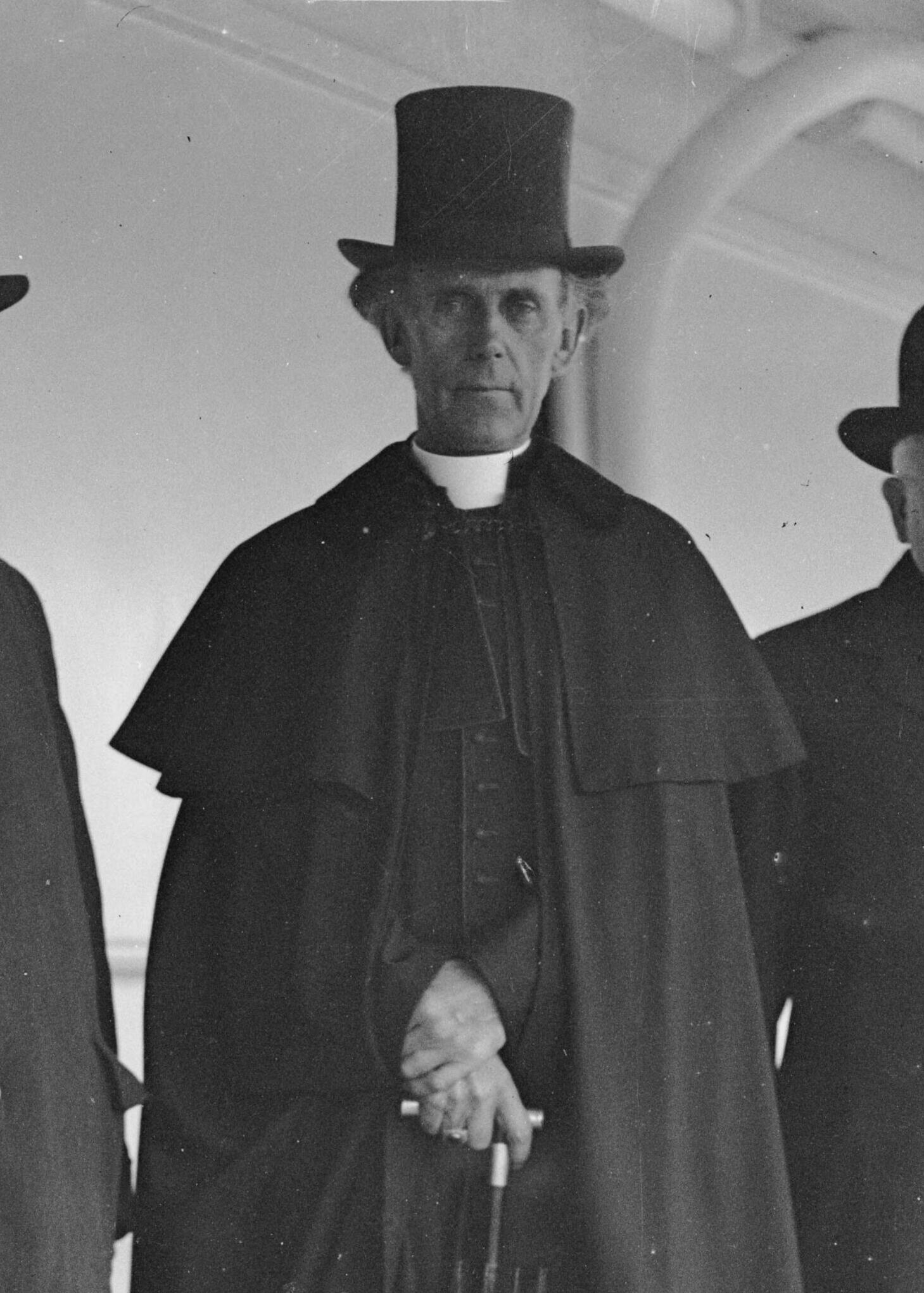
Daniel Mannix (51) was the Archbishop of Melbourne for 46 years

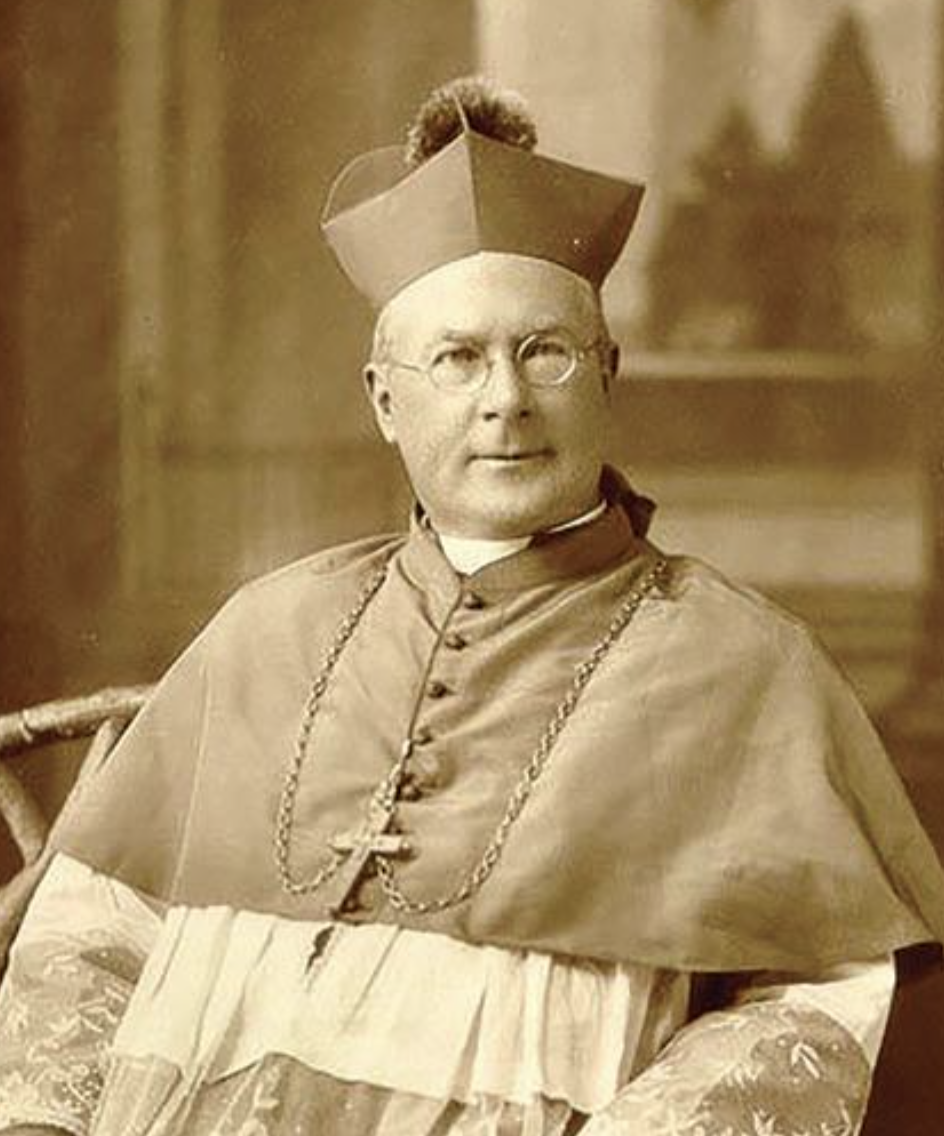
Terence Bernard McGuire (72) was the first Bishop of Townsville

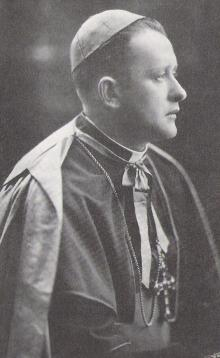
Redmond Garrett Prendiville (76) was reputedly the youngest-ever Catholic archbishop in 1933

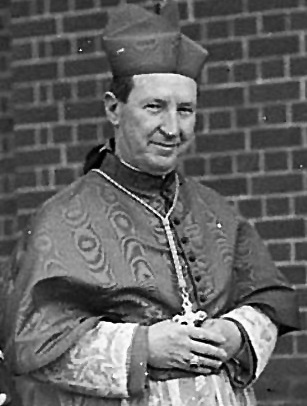
Norman Thomas Gilroy (77) was the first Australian-born to be made a cardinal

No.	Bishop	Order	Consecrators	Year	Diocese
51	Daniel Mannix		AO2 BQ1 BR1	1912	III Melbourne, II Military
52	Joseph Shiel		51 BJ2 BS1	1913	IV Rockhampton
53	Patrick Phelan		30 36 38	1913	II Sale
54	John Alphonsus Heavey	O.S.A.	BC2 BT1 BU1	1914	II Cooktown (Vicariate Apostolic), I Cairns
55	Robert William Spence	O.P.	50 47 31	1914	VI Adelaide
56	Daniel Foley		30 27 51	1916	IV Ballarat
57	John McCarthy		51 52 56	1917	III Sandhurst
58	William Hayden		43 45 48	1918	II Wilcannia–Forbes, V Hobart
59	Joseph Wilfred Dwyer		BV1° 38 40	1918	I Wagga Wagga
60	William Barry		43 48 58	1919	IV Hobart
61	Michael O’Farrell	CM	BV1° 40 48	1920	IV Bathurst
62	Michael Sheehan		AQ1 BR1 BW1	1922	Sydney (Coadjutor)
63	Ernesto Coppo	S.D.B.	BX1 BY1 BZ1	1922	I Kimberley (Vicariate Apostolic)
64	Richard Ryan	C.M.	51 57 61	1923	II Geraldton, III Sale
65	Andrew Killian		55 58 59	1924	IV Port Augusta, VII Adelaide
66	John Barry		43 58 59	1924	IV Goulburn
67	John Francis Norton		CA1 CB1 61	1926	V Bathurst
68	James Byrne		BV1° 52 54	1929	I Toowoomba
69	John Aloysius Coleman		62 40 48	1929	IV Armidale
70	Edmund John Aloysius Gleeson	C.Ss.R.	43 40 48	1929	IV Maitland
71	James Patrick O’Collins		51 48 70	1930	III Geraldton, V Ballarat
72	Terence Bernard McGuire		BV1° 48 68	1930	I Townsville, IV Canberra and Goulburn
73	Patrick Joseph Farrelly		BV1° 70 72	1931	III Lismore
74	Thomas Martin Fox		BV1° 59 65	1931	III Wilcannia
75	Romuald Denis Hayes	S.S.C.	51 69 74	1932	V Rockhampton
76	Redmond Garrett Prendiville		CC1° 58 65	1933	V Perth
77	Norman Thomas Gilroy		CC1° 48 72	1935	V Port Augusta, V Sydney
78	Otto Raible	S.A.C.	CD1 CE1 CF1	1935	II Kimberley (Vicariate Apostolic)
79	Justin Daniel Simonds		CG1° 73 77	1937	VI Hobart IV Melbourne
80	Francis Augustin Henschke		65 74 77	1937	Adelaide (Auxiliary), II Wagga Wagga
81	Francis-Xavier Gsell	M.S.C.	CG1° 77 CH1	1938	I Darwin
82	Hugh Edward Ryan		CG1° 72 77	1938	II Townsville
83	Joseph Basil Roper		51 72 82	1938	II Toowoomba
84	Thomas Absolem McCabe		CG1° 48 73	1939	VI Port Augusta I Wollongong, III Military
85	Matthew Beovich		CG1° 71 77	1940	VIII Adelaide
86	Alfred Joseph Gummer		77 67 71	1942	IV Geraldton
87	Ernest Victor Tweedy		CG1° 70 84	1943	VII Hobart
88	Andrew Gerard Tynan		CG1° 69 83	1946	VI Rockhampton
89	Bernard Denis Stewart		79 85 97	1947	IV Sandhurst
90	John Thomas Toohey		77 70 87	1948	V Maitland
91	Eris Norman Michael O’Brien		CG1° 74 73	1948	Sydney (Auxiliary), V Canberra and Goulburn
92	Edward John Doody		CG1° 88 90	1948	V Armidale
93	Guilford Clyde Young		CG1° 88 91	1948	Canberra and Goulburn (Auxiliary), VIII Hobart
94	Thomas Vincent Cahill		77 82 89	1949	II Cairns VI Canberra and Goulburn
95	Patrick Mary O'Donnell		77 64 70	1949	IV Brisbane
96	John Patrick O'Loughlin	M.S.C.	85 CE1 CI1	1950	II Darwin
97	Patrick Francis Lyons		51 85	1944 (Note: Appointed Bishop of Christchurch, New Zealand. Appointed to Sydney in 1950.)	Sydney (Auxiliary), IV Sale
98	Lancelot John Goody		86 97 89	1951	Perth (Auxiliary), I Bunbury, VI Perth
99	Bryan Gallagher		CJ1° 71 86	1952	VII Port Pirie
100	William Joseph Brennan		77 74 89	1953	III Toowoomba

=== 101-150 ===
No.	Bishop	Order	Consecrators	Year	Diocese
101	James Patrick Carroll		77 67 97	1954	Sydney (Auxiliary)
102	John Joseph Rafferty		CK1° 98 86	1955	Perth (Auxiliary)
103	Arthur Francis Fox		79 71 89	1957	Melbourne (Auxiliary), V Sale
104	James William Gleeson		85 99 103	1957	Adelaide (Auxiliary), IX Adelaide
105	James Darcy Freeman		77 90 101	1957	Sydney (Auxiliary), VI Armidale VI Sydney
106	Ivan Prasko		CL1 CM1 CN1	1958	I Ukrainian
107	Johannes (John) Jobst	S.A.C.	CK1° 78 101	1959	III Kimberley (Vicariate Apostolic), I Broome
108	John Neil Cullinane		91 101 105	1959	Canberra and Goulburn (Auxiliary), Melbourne (Auxiliary)
109	Thomas William Muldoon		PP261 CO1 CP1	1960	Sydney (Auxiliary)
110	Francis Roberts Rush		CQ1° 82 93	1961	VII Rockhampton, V Brisbane
111	Francis Xavier Thomas		89 94 103	1962	V Geraldton
112	Myles McKeon		98 107 111	1962	Perth (Auxiliary), II Bunbury
113	Albert Reuben Edward Thomas		PP262 CR1 CS1	1963	VI Bathurst
114	Douglas Joseph Warren		77 89 99	1964	Wilcannia–Forbes (Auxiliary), IV Wilcannia–Forbes
115	Lawrence Patrick Moran		PP262 CT1 104	1964	Melbourne (Auxiliary)
116	James Robert Knox		CU1 CC1 CV1	1953 (Note: Ordained Titular Archbishop of Melitene in 1953 while working for . Appointed to Melbourne in 1967.)	V Melbourne
117	Francis Patrick Carroll		80 110 114	1967	III Wagga Wagga, VIII Canberra
118	Henry Joseph Kennedy		77 95 101	1967	Brisbane (Auxiliary), VII Armidale
119	Leonard Anthony Faulkner		85 110 NZ2	1967	III Townsville, X Adelaide
120	John Ahern Torpie		95 94 110	1967	III Cairns
121	Ronald Austin Mulkearns		116 71 103	1968	VI Ballarat
122	Edward Francis Kelly		77 CW1° 85	1969	Sydney (Auxiliary), IV Toowoomba
123	John Aloysius Morgan		77 85 94	1969	Canberra (Auxiliary), IV Military
124	John Steven Satterthwaite		77 94 104	1973	IV Lismore
125	Peter Quinn		98 111 112	1969	Perth (Auxiliary), III Bunbury
126	John Anthony Kelly		116 108 121	1973	Melbourne (Auxiliary)]
127	Thomas Francis Little		116 108 121	1973	Melbourne (Auxiliary), VI Melbourne
128	Eric Gerard Perkins		116 108 121	1973	Melbourne (Auxiliary)
129	Philip James Anthony Kennedy		104 96 99	1973	Adelaide (Auxiliary)
130	Ignace Abdo Khalifé	S.J.	CX1 CY1 CZ1	1970 (Note: Ordained Auxiliary of Antioch in 1970. Installed in Maronite Eparchy in Australia in 1973.)	I Maronite
131	Edward Bede Clancy		105 116 94	1974	Sydney (Auxiliary), VII Canberra, VII Sydney
132	David Cremin		105 116 94	1974	Sydney (Auxiliary)
133	Bernard Joseph Wallace		110 105 DA1°	1974	VIII Rockhampton
134	William Edward Murray		105 94 101	1976	II Wollongong
135	John Joseph Gerry		110 127 133	1975	Brisbane (Auxiliary)
136	Robert Healy		98 105 127	1975	Perth (Auxiliary)
137	Joseph Peter O'Connell		127 103 121	1976	Melbourne (Auxiliary)
138	Leo Morris Clarke		105 94 127	1976	VI Maitland-Newcastle
139	Patrick Dougherty		94 105 DA1°	1976	Canberra and Goulburn (Auxiliary), VII Bathurst
140	Patrick Laurence Murphy		105 94 101	1977	Sydney (Auxiliary), I Broken Bay
141	Noel Desmond Daly		103 89 111	1979	V Sandhurst
142	Bede Vincent Heather		105 127 DB1	1979	Sydney (Auxiliary), I Parramatta
143	Francis Peter de Campo		104 138 141	1980	VIII Port Pirie
144	Joseph Eric D'Arcy		103 127 138	1981	VI Sale, IX Hobart
145	William Joseph Foley		111 98 107	1981	VI Geraldton, VII Perth
146	John Edward Heaps		105 DC1° 101	1981	Sydney (Auxiliary)
147	Eugene James Cuskelly		110 93 DC1°	1982	Brisbane (Auxiliary)
148	William John Brennan		131 117 DC1°	1984	IV Wagga Wagga
149	Geoffrey James Robinson		131 105 DC1°	1984	Sydney (Auxiliary)
150	Barry James Hickey		145 98 111	1984	VII Geraldton, VIII Perth

=== 151-200 ===
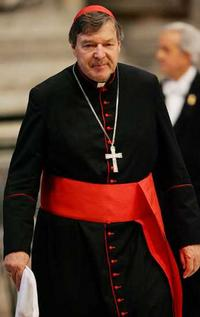
George Pell (157) was the most recent Australian-born Cardinal

No.	Bishop	Order	Consecrators	Year	Diocese
151	Raymond Conway Benjamin		110 98 119	1984	IV Townsville
152	Geoffrey Francis Mayne		110 131 DC1°	1985	V Military
153	John Alexius Bathersby		110 120 122	1986	IV Cairns, VI Brisbane
154	Patrick Percival Power		117 123 131	1986	Canberra and Goulburn (Auxiliary)
155	Edmund John Patrick Collins	M.S.C.	119 122 147	1986	III Darwin
156	Peter John Connors		127 121 137	1987	Melbourne (Auxiliary), VII Ballarat
157	George Pell		127 121 137	1987	Melbourne (Auxiliary), VII Melbourne, VIII Sydney
158	George Riashi	B.C.	DD1 DE1 DF1	1987	I Melkite
159	Jeremiah Joseph Coffey		127 132 144	1989	VII Sale
160	Joseph Habib Hitti		PP264 DG1 DH1	1991	II Maronite
161	Kevin Michael Manning		131 118 139	1991	VIII Armidale, II Parramatta
162	Brian Heenan		110 132 153	1991	IX Rockhampton
163	Justin Joseph Bianchini		150 125 136	1992	VIII Geraldton
164	James Foley		153 110 120	1992	V Cairns
165	William Martin Morris		122 110 153	1993	V Toowoomba
166	Hilton Forrest Deakin		127 128 137	1993	Melbourne (Auxiliary)
167	Peter Stasiuk	C.Ss.R.	CL1 DI1 DJ1	1993	II Ukrainian
168	Peter William Ingham		131 101 139	1993	Sydney (Auxiliary), IV Wollongong
169	Barry Francis Collins		131 114 132	1994	V Wilcannia–Forbes
170	Michael John Malone		138 140 168	1995	VII Maitland-Newcastle
171	Michael Ernest Putney		153 110 165	1995	Brisbane (Auxiliary), V Townsville
172	Christopher Alan Saunders		107 155 163	1996	II Broome
173	Issam John Darwish	B.S.	DD1 DK1 DL1	1996	II Melkite
174	Philip Edward Wilson		131 134 138	1996	III Wollongong, XI Adelaide
175	David Louis Walker		131 140 161	1996	II Broken Bay
176	Denis James Hart		157 127 166	1997	Melbourne (Auxiliary), VIII Melbourne
177	Adrian Leo Doyle		144 156 161	1998	X Hobart
178	Joseph Angelo Grech		157 127 137	1999	Melbourne (Auxiliary), VI Sandhurst
179	Daniel Eugene Hurley		119 141 155	1999	IX Port Pirie, IV Darwin
180	Luc Julian Matthys		131 161 DM1°	1999	IX Armidale
181	Geoffrey Hylton Jarrett		131 124 DM1°	2001	V Lismore
182	Christopher Henry Toohey		157 114 131	2001	VI Wilcannia–Forbes
183	Gerard Joseph Holohan		125 136 150	2001	IV Bunbury
184	Ad Abi Karam		CY1 DN1 DO1	2002	III Maronite
185	Donald George Sproxton		150 136 163	2002	**Perth (Auxiliary)**
186	Brian Vincent Finnigan		153 117 DM1°	2002	Brisbane (Auxiliary)
187	Gerard Joseph Hanna		117 157 180	2002	V Wagga Wagga
188	Mark Benedict Coleridge		176 157 DM1°	2002	Melbourne (Auxiliary), IX Canberra and Goulburn, VII Brisbane
189	Joseph John Oudeman	O.F.M. Cap.	153 135 DM1°	2003	Brisbane (Auxiliary)
190	Christopher Charles Prowse^{‡}		176 157 DM1°	2003	VIII Sale, **X Canberra and Goulburn**
191	Max Leroy Davis		152 117 DM1°	2003	VI Military
192	Anthony Colin Joseph Fisher^{‡}	O.P.	157 131 AUS11	2003	Sydney (Auxiliary), III Parramatta, **IX Sydney**
193	Julian Charles Porteous		157 131 AUS11	2003	Sydney (Auxiliary), XI Hobart
194	Gregory O'Kelly	S.J.	174 119 179	2006	Adelaide (Auxiliary), X Port Pirie
195	Djibrail Kassab		DP1 DQ1 DR1 DS1 DT1	1996 (Note: Ordained Archbishop of Bassorah in 1996. Installed in Chaldean Eparchy in Australia in 2006.)	I Chaldean
196	Timothy John Costelloe^{‡}	S.D.B.	176 157 DU1°	2007	Melbourne (Auxiliary), **IX Perth**
197	Peter John Elliott		176 157 DU1°	2007	Melbourne (Auxiliary)
198	Terence John Gerard Brady		157 132 168	2007	Sydney (Auxiliary)
199	Leslie Rogers Tomlinson		176 121 DV1°	2009	Melbourne (Auxiliary), VII Sandhurst
200	Michael Joseph McKenna^{‡}		157 139 159	2009	**VIII Bathurst**

=== 201-250 ===
No.	Bishop	Order	Consecrators	Year	Diocese
201	Peter Andrew Comensoli^{‡}		157 168 174	2011	Sydney (Auxiliary), III Broken Bay, **IX Melbourne**
202	William Joseph Wright		157 170 201	2011	VIII Maitland-Newcastle
203	Vincent Long Văn Nguyễn^{‡}	O.F.M. Conv.	176 157 DV1°	2011	Melbourne (Auxiliary), **IV Parramatta**
204	Robert Rabbat^{‡}		DD2 DW1 173	2011	**III Melkite**
205	Michael Robert Kennedy^{‡}		180 157 187	2012	X Armidale, **IX Maitland-Newcastle**
206	Robert Michael McGuckin		188 192 DV1°	2012	VI Toowoomba
207	Paul Bernard Bird	C.Ss.R.	176 156 199	2012	VIII Ballarat
208	Antoine-Charbel Tarabay^{‡}	O.L.M.	CX2 DX1 DY1	2013	**IV Maronite**
209	Bosco Puthur		DZ1 EA1 EB1	2010 (Note: Appointed Curial Bishop of Ernakulam-Angamaly (Syro-Malabar), India in 2010. Installed in Syro-Malabar Eparchy in Australia in 2014.)	I Syro-Malabar
210	Michael Fabian McCarthy		188 162 EC1°	2014	X Rockhampton
211	Columba Macbeth-Green^{‡}	O.S.P.P.E.	EC1° 168 205	2014	**VII Wilcannia–Forbes**
212	Terence Robert Curtin		176 188 EC1°	2014	Melbourne (Auxiliary)
213	Mark Stuart Edwards^{‡}	O.M.I.	176 188 EC1°	2014	Melbourne (Auxiliary), **VI Wagga Wagga**
214	Patrick Michael O’Regan^{‡}		176 190 200	2015	IX Sale, **XII Adelaide**
215	Paul III Amel (Shamon) Nona		DP2 EE1 EF1	2010 (Note: Ordained Archbishop of Mossul in 2010. Installed in Chaldean Eparchy in Australia in 2015.)	II Chaldean (Note: Appointed Patriarch of Baghdad in 2026.)
216	Anthony Randazzo		192 188 EG1	2016	Sydney (Auxiliary), IV Broken Bay (Note: Appointed Prefect of the Dicastery for Legislative Texts in 2026.)
217	Richard James Umbers		192 188 EG1	2016	**Sydney (Auxiliary)**
218	Gregory Paul Homeming^{‡}	O.C.D.	192 168 181	2017	**VI Lismore**
219	Timothy James Harris^{‡}		188 164 EH1°	2017	**VI Townsville**
220	Kenneth Michael Howell^{‡}		188 186 210	2017	Brisbane (Auxiliary), **VII Toowoomba**
221	Michael Henry Morrissey^{‡}		196 150 163	2017	**IX Geraldton**
222	Brian Gregory Mascord^{‡}		192 168 201	2018	**V Wollongong**
223	Charles Victor Emmanuel Gauci^{‡}		179 185 194	2018	**V Darwin**
224	Shane Anthony Mackinlay^{‡}		201 199 207	2019	XIII Sandhurst, **XIII Brisbane**
225	Mykola Bychok^{‡}	C.Ss.R.	EI1 EJ1 EK1	2020	**III Ukrainian**
226	Karol Kulczycki^{‡}	S.D.S.	EH1° EL1 EM1	2020	**XI Port Pirie**
227	Gregory Charles Bennet^{‡}		201 176 214	2020	**X Sale**
228	Martin Ashe		201 212 227	2021	**Melbourne (Auxiliary)**
229	Anthony John Ireland^{‡}		201 212 227	2021	Melbourne (Auxiliary), **XII Hobart**
230	Daniel Joseph Meagher^{‡}		192 190 216	2021	Sydney (Auxiliary, **XI Rockhampton**
231	Timothy John Norton^{‡}	S.V.D.	188 220 AUS13	2022	Brisbane (Auxiliary), **IV Broome**
232	John Panamthottathil^{‡}	C.M.I.	DZ2 209 EN1	2023	**II Syro-Malabar**
233	Joseph John Caddy^{‡}		188 196 201	2024	**VII Cairns**
234	Rene Ramirez^{‡}	R.C.J.	201 224 227	2025	Melbourne (Auxiliary), **IX Sandhurst**
235	Joachim Nguyễn Xuân Thinh		201 224 227	2025	**Melbourne (Auxiliary)**
236	George (Jerzy) Joseph Kołodziej^{‡}	S.D.S.	196 183 226	2025	**V Bunbury**
237	Anthony Gerard Percy		192 188 190	2025	**Sydney (Auxiliary)**
238	Peter Mel Murphy^{‡}		192 205 213	2025	**XI Armidale**
239	Mark William Freeman^{‡}		201 207 229	2026	**IX Ballarat**
240	Nelson Abordo Po		196 185 234	2026	**Perth (Auxiliary)**

=== Australian Bishops not appointed to an Australian See ===
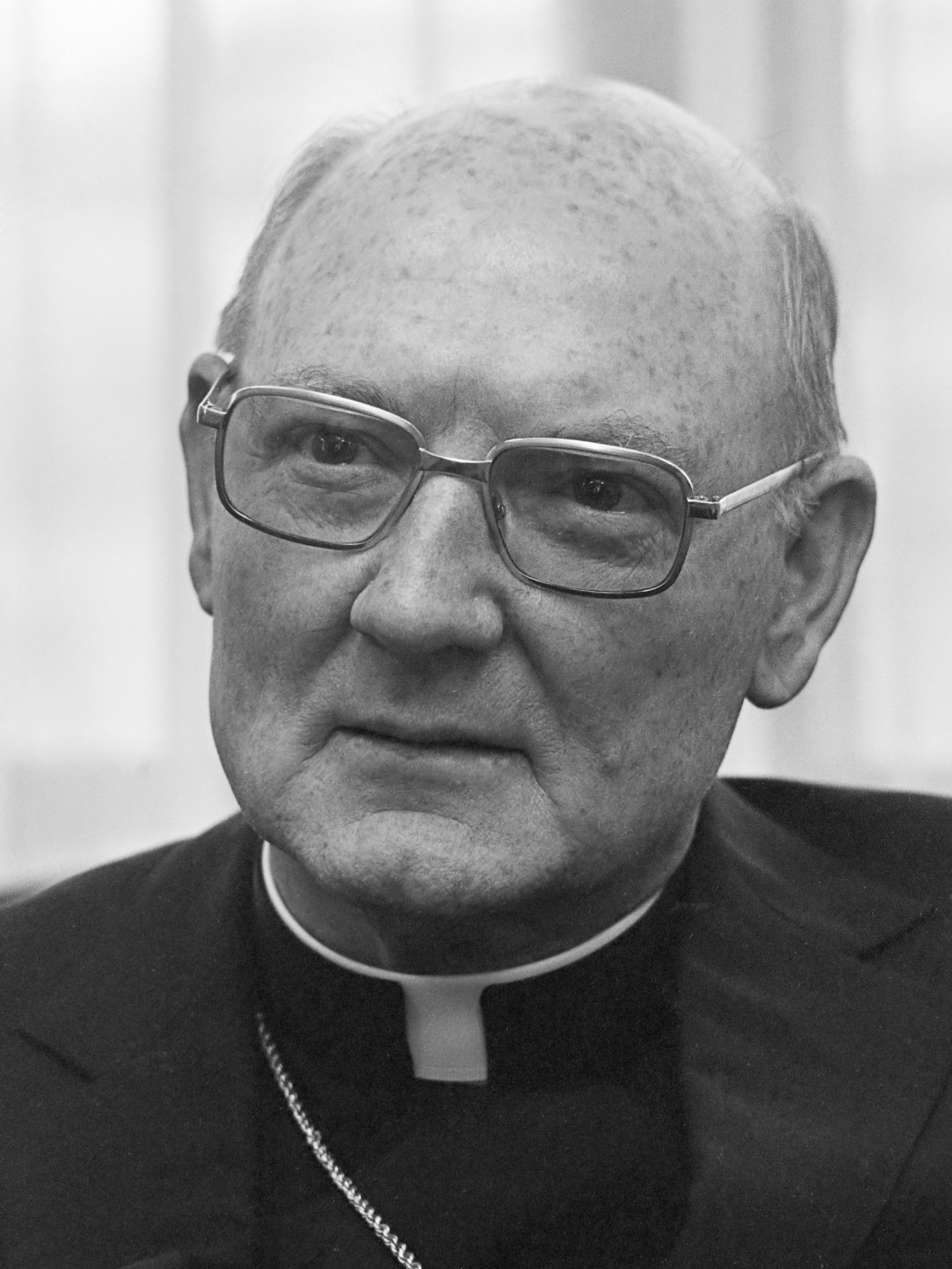
Edward Idris Cassidy (AUS8) worked for the Vatican's diplomatic service and was never appointed to an Australian see.

No.	Bishop	Order	Consecrators	Year	Diocese
AUS1	James Whyte		NZ1 48 NZ3	1920	III Dunedin
AUS2	Francis John Doyle	M.S.C.	CK1° 96 EO1	1957	I Samarai (Vicariate Apostolic), I Sideia
AUS3	Ignatius John Doggett	O.F.M.	CK1° 67 89	1957	Aitape (Vicariate Apostolic), I Aitape
AUS4	Virgil Patrick Copas	M.S.C.	46 96 100	1960	IV Port Moresby, I Kerema
AUS5	Paschal Sweeney	C.P.	77 113 AUS3	1967	I Vanimo
AUS6	William Kevin Rowell	O.F.M.	DA1° EP1 EQ1	1970	II Aitape
AUS7	Desmond Charles Moore	M.S.C.	AUS4 104 AUS2	1970	Ballarat
AUS8	Edward Idris Cassidy		ER1 ES1 85	1970	I Amantia (Titular See), Cardinal-Deacon of Santa Maria in Via Lata, Cardinal-Priest of Santa Maria in Via Lata
AUS9	John Etheridge	C.P.	ET1 EQ2 EU1	1980	II Vanimo
AUS10	Brian James Barnes	O.F.M.	EQ2 EQ3 EV1	1988	III Aitape, VII Port Moresby
AUS11	Bernard Cyril O’Grady	O.P.	EW1 EX1 EY1	1995	II Gizo
AUS12	Austen Robin Crapp	O.F.M.	EQ3 AUS10 EZ1	1999	IV Aitape
AUS13	Douglas William Young	S.V.D.	FA1 FB1 FC1	2000	Mount Hagen (Auxiliary), III Mount Hagen
AUS14	Anthony Joseph Burgess		EP2 AUS10 AUS12	2000	VII Wewak

== Abbreviations and notes ==
=== Foreign consecrators ===
- AA=Titular Bishop of Usula
- AB=Titular Bishop of Olena
- AC=Titular Bishop of Nilopolis
- AD=Titular Bishop of Cambysopolis
- AE=Titular Bishop of Areopolis
- AF=Cardinal-Priest of Santa Maria in Ara Coeli
- AG=Bishop of Philadelphia
- AH=Bishop of Baghdad
- AI=Titular Bishop of Etalonia
- AJ=Titular Bishop of Troas
- AK=Archbishop of Tuam
- AL=Titular Bishop of Hierapolis in Isauria
- AM=Titular Bishop of Sidon
- AN=Titular Bishop of Lystra
- AO=Archbishop of Armagh
- AP=Titular Bishop of Lydia
- AQ=Archbishop of Dublin
- AR=Bishop of Cork
- AS=Bishop of Limerick
- AT=Bishop of Kerry e Aghadoe
- AU=Titular Bishop of Tipasa in Mauretania
- AV=Titular Bishop of Arcadiopolis in Asia
- AW=Titular Bishop of Antigonea
- AX=Archbishop of Westminster
- AY=Bishop of Beverley
- AZ=Bishop of Hexham and Newcastle
- BA=Cardinal-Priest of Santa Maria in Trastevere
- BB=Titular Archbishop of Petra in Palaestina
- BC=Bishop of Ferns
- BD=Bishop of Southwark
- BE=Titular Bishop of Amyclae
- BF=Titular Bishop of Caesaropolis
- BG=Bishop of Kildare and Leighlin
- BH=Bishop of Elphin
- BI=Bishop of Killala
- BJ=Bishop of Meath
- BK=Bishop of Liverpool
- BL=Titular Archbishop of Laodicea in Phrygia
- BM=Bishop of Nepi e Sutri
- BN=Cardinal-Deacon of Santa Maria della Scala
- BO=Archbishop of Spoleto
- BP=Titular Bishop of Oëa
- BQ=Bishop of Cloyne
- BR=Bishop of Killaloe
- BS=Bishop of Clogher
- BT=Bishop of Clonfert
- BU=Titular Bishop of Temnus
- BV=Titular Archbishop of Palmyra
- BW=Bishop of Waterford and Lismore
- BX=Titular Bishop of Obba
- BY=Titular Bishop of Carystus
- BZ=Titular Bishop of Eudoxias
- CA=Cardinal-Priest of Santa Croce in Gerusalemme
- CB=Titular Archbishop of Seleucia in Isauria
- CC=Titular Archbishop of Antiochia in Pisidia
- CD=Bishop of Limburg
- CE=Titular Bishop of Diocletianopolis in Palaestina
- CF=Titular Bishop of Zuri
- CG=Titular Archbishop of Iustiniana Prima
- CH=Titular Bishop of Eriza
- CI=Titular Bishop of Mostene
- CJ=Titular Archbishop of Doclea
- CK=Titular Archbishop of Sidon
- CL=Archbishop of Winnipeg (Ukrainian)
- CM=Titular Archbishop of Leucas
- CN=Archbishop of Toronto (Ukrainian)
- CO=Titular Bishop of Hilta
- CP=Titular Bishop of Caesariana
- CQ=Titular Archbishop of Paltus
- CR=Titular Archbishop of Neapolis in Pisidia
- CS=Titular Archbishop of Iconium
- CT=Archbishop of Cape Coast
- CU=Cardinal-Priest of Santi Nereo ed Achilleo
- CV=Titular Archbishop of Ternobus
- CW=Titular Archbishop of Ancusa
- CX=Patriarch of Antioch (Maronite)
- CY=Titular Bishop of Tarsus dei Maroniti
- CZ=Archbishop of Alep (Maronite)
- DA=Titular Archbishop of Torcello
- DB=Bishop of Awka
- DC=Titular Archbishop of Fiorentino
- DD=Patriarch of Antioch (Melkite)
- DE=Eparch of Newton (Melkite)
- DF=Titular Archbishop of Apamea in Syria dei Greco-Melkiti
- DG=Titular Archbishop of Forum Novum
- DH=Titular Archbishop of Volsinium
- DI=Archbishop of Philadelphia (Ukrainian)
- DJ=Bishop of Edmonton (Ukrainian)
- DK=Titular Archbishop of Palmyra dei Greco-Melkiti
- DL=Archbishop of Zahleh e Furzol (Melkite Greek)
- DM=Titular Archbishop of Valeria
- DN=Titular Bishop of Arca in Phoenicia dei Maroniti
- DO=Titular Bishop of Callinicum dei Maroniti
- DP=Patriarch of Babylon
- DQ=Archbishop of Mossul-Aqrā (Akra) (Chaldean)
- DR=Titular Archbishop of Kaskar dei Caldie
- DS=Archbishop of Arbil (Chaldean)
- DT=Bishop of Saint Thomas the Apostle of Detroit (Chaldean)
- DU=Titular Archbishop of Lares
- DV=Titular Archbishop of Numana
- DW=Archbishop of Beirut and Jbeil (Melkite Greek)
- DX=Archbishop of Beirut (Maronite)
- DY=Bishop of Batrun (Maronite)
- DZ=Major Archbishop of Ernakulam-Angamaly (Syro-Malabar)
- EA=Archbishop of Tellicherry (Syro-Malabar)
- EB=Archbishop of Trichur (Syro-Malabar)
- EC=Titular Archbishop of Hodelm
- EE=Titular Archbishop of Ostra
- EF=Titular Archbishop of Nisibis dei Caldei
- EG=Bishop of Macau
- EH=Titular Archbishop of Montecorvino
- EI=Major Archbishop of Kyiv-Halyč (Ukrainian)
- EJ=Archbishop of Lviv (Ukrainian)
- EK=Titular Bishop of Panium
- EL=Archbishop of Kraków
- EM=Titular Bishop of Margum
- EN=Bishop of Thamarassery (Syro-Malabar)
- EO=Titular Bishop of Antiphrae
- EP=Bishop of Wewak
- EQ=Archbishop of Madang
- ER=Cardinal-Priest of Santissima Trinità al Monte Pincio
- ES=Titular Archbishop of Tusuros
- ET=Archbishop of Port Moresby
- EU=Bishop Emeritus of Bereina
- EV=Titular Archbishop of Aeclanum
- EW=Bishop Emeritus of Gizo
- EX=Archbishop of Honiara
- EY=Titular Archbishop of Sarda
- EZ=Bishop of Mendi
- FA=Archbishop of Mount Hagen
- FB=Bishop of Wabag
- FC=Bishop of Kavieng

=== Other abbreviations ===
- F=Priest who was not a bishop
- PP=Pope
- NZ=Bishop from New Zealand

== See also ==
- Appointment of Catholic bishops
- Catholic Church hierarchy
- Catholic Church in Australia
- List of Catholic bishops in Australia
- Lists of patriarchs, archbishops, and bishops

== Sources ==
- Cheney, David M. (2026). "Catholic-Hierarchy: Its Bishops and Dioceses, Current and Past".
