= Thomas Furlong =

Thomas Furlong may refer to:

- Thomas Furlong (artist) (1886–1952), Scotch Irish American artist and teacher
- Thomas Furlong (bishop) (1803-1875) Roman Catholic bishop of Ferns from 1857 to 1875
- Thomas Furlong (poet) (1794–1827), Irish poet
