= John Gerry =

John Gerry may refer to:

- John F. Gerry, American judge
- John Joseph Gerry, Roman Catholic bishop
