= Noel Daly =

Australian bishop (1929–2004)

The Most Reverend Noel Daly
- Bishop Emeritus of Diocese of Sandhurst
- Diocese: Sandhurst
- Installed: 11 July 1979
- Term ended: 1 July 2000
- Predecessor: Bernard Denis Stewart
- Successor: Joseph Angelo Grech

Orders
- Ordination: 27 July 1952 at St Mary's Cathedral, Sale by Richard Ryan
- Consecration: 11 July 1979 at Sacred Heart Cathedral, Bendigo by Arthur Francis Fox

Personal details
- Born: Noel Desmond Daly; 10 February 1929 Sale, Victoria, Australia
- Died: 14 January 2004 (aged 74) Bendigo, Victoria, Australia
- Buried: Sacred Heart Cathedral, Bendigo, Victoria, Australia
- Denomination: Catholic Church
- Occupation: Catholic bishop
- Motto: Pasce oves meas (Feed my sheep)

Noel Desmond Daly (10 February 1929 − 14 January 2004) was an Australian Catholic bishop who served as Bishop of Sandhurst for more than two decades.

== Early life ==
Daly was born to William Joseph and Margaret Daly, into a devout Catholic family in Sale and had seven siblings. Four of his siblings entered religious life, with three brothers joining the Marist Brothers and his sister joining the Sisters of St Joseph of the Sacred Heart. One brother, Frank (Br Geoffrey FMS) became a priest for the Diocese of Bathurst in 1968. His two other siblings were teachers and another died when he was just six months old before Noel was born. He received his early education from the Sisters of St Joseph and then moved onto St Patrick's College, Sale, run by the Marist Brothers. He then entered Corpus Christi College, Werribee.

== Priesthood ==
On 27 July 1952, Daly was ordained a priest for the Diocese of Sale by Bishop Richard Ryan at St Mary's Cathedral, Sale. His first assignment was as assistant priest at Yallourn before being moved to St Michael's, Traralgon in September 1953. In 1959, he moved on and served in the parishes of Lakes Entrance, Leongatha, Warragul and Morwell before being appointed Prelate of Honour, given the title of Monsignor and appointed Vicar General at Sale. In 1974 he became Diocesan Secretary.

== Episcopate ==
On 21 April 1979, Daly was appointed Bishop of the Diocese of Sandhurst. He was consecrated a bishop on 11 July 1979 by Bishop Arthur Fox in Sacred Heart Cathedral, Bendigo.

His episcopate was defined by many new pastoral initiatives and offices including Centacare Family Services, Faith Education Sandhurst, the Renew and Many Parishes One Purpose Program, the Ministry to Priests Program and Continuing Education of Priests, Vocations Ministry, Youth Ministry, Sacramental policies including the Steps in Faith parish approach to Confirmation-Eucharist preparation.

During his episcopacy, he helped to re-establish the historical and cultural links between Bendigo and the German community of Paderborn (the hometown of Bendigo's first priest, Dr Henry Backhaus), and in recognition of his efforts, Bishop Daly was invested with the Knight Commander's Cross of the Order of Merit in 1996 by the German Consul General.

== Retirement and death ==
Daly resigned in 2000 due to ill-health, still four years shy of the canonical retirement age of 75.

He died on 14 January 2004, just a few weeks prior to his 75th birthday. He was survived only by his sister, Sister Margaret RSJ and was interred in the crypt at Sacred Heart Cathedral, Bendigo.

Catholic Church titles
Preceded by Bernard Denis Stewart	Bishop of Sandhurst; 1979–2000	Succeeded by Joseph Angelo Grech
