= Robert Healy (bishop) =

Irish-born Australian Catholic bishop (1925–2002)

The Most Reverend Robert Healy
- Auxiliary Bishop Emeritus of Archdiocese of Perth
- Archdiocese: Perth
- Installed: 9 December 1975
- Term ended: 25 October 2000
- Other post: Titular Bishop of Mageó (1975–2002)

Orders
- Ordination: 25 June 1949 at St Kieran's College Chapel, Kilkenny by Patrick Collier
- Consecration: 9 December 1975 at St Mary's Cathedral, Perth by Launcelot John Goody

Personal details
- Born: Robert Healy; 17 July 1925 Croghtenclogh, County Kilkenny, Ireland
- Died: 18 November 2002 (aged 100) Manning, Western Australia, Australia
- Denomination: Catholic Church
- Occupation: Catholic bishop
- Education: St Kieran's College

Robert Healy (17 July 1925 – 18 November 2002) was an Irish-born Australian bishop of the Catholic Church. He served as Auxiliary Bishop of Perth for 25 years.

== Early life ==
Healy was born in Cruttinclough, County Kilkenny, the eldest of seven children. He pursued studies for priestly ministry at St Kieran's College.

== Priesthood ==
Healy was ordained a priest on 25 June 1949 for the Diocese of Ossory by Bishop Patrick Collier. While he was ordained for the Diocese of Ossory, he went to serve in Perth straight away, arriving in Western Australia on 23 February 1950. He was incardinated the same year.

He was appointed assistant priest at South Perth following his arrival in Australia. He then served at Queens Park, Maylands and Claremont. In 1955, he was appointed priest in charge at Boulder and administrator of Kalgoorlie in 1956. In 1965, he became the parish priest of the new parish of Willagee. He would later describe Willagee as one of the highlights of his priestly ministry, building a church and life in the parish. In 1971, he was appointed parish priest of Cottesloe, holding that position until his elevation to the episcopate.

== Episcopate ==
On 2 October 1975, Healy was appointed Auxiliary Bishop of Perth and Titular Bishop of Mageó by Pope Paul VI. He was consecrated on 9 December 1975 at St Mary's Cathedral, Perth by Archbishop Launcelot John Goody. His mother travelled from Ireland for the ceremony as did Bishop Peter Birch of Ossory, the Diocese to which Healy was originally ordained.

Healy was a great encourager of the Redemptoris Mater Seminary, Perth in its early years. Since its opening, the seminary has given more than 50 priests to the Archdiocese of Perth.

Healy served his episcopal ministry under three Archbishops: Archbishop Launcelot John Goody, Archbishop William Joseph Foley and Archbishop Barry James Hickey He briefly served as administrator of the Archdiocese in 1991 following the death of Archbishop William Foley.

== Retirement and Death ==
Healy retired from episcopal ministry on 25 October 2002, having reached the canonical retirement age of 75 a few months earlier. He died on 18 November 2002 at his home in Manning. Archbishop Hickey and 11 other priests were at a nearby tennis court when his housekeeper discovered the deceased Healy and all immediately went to his home to anoint him. His funeral took place on 23 November 2002 at St Mary's Cathedral, Perth.

Catholic Church titles
Preceded by —	Auxiliary Bishop of Perth; 1975–2000	Succeeded by —
Preceded by James Moynagh	Titular Bishop of Mageó; 1975–2002	Succeeded by Thomas Anthony Williams
