= Francis Xavier Thomas =

Australian Catholic bishop (1906–1985)

The Most Reverend Francis Xavier Thomas
- Bishop of Diocese of Geraldton
- Diocese: Geraldton
- Installed: 31 July 1962
- Term ended: 13 July 1981
- Predecessor: Alfred Joseph Gummer
- Successor: William Joseph Foley

Orders
- Ordination: 13 July 1930 at Sacred Heart Cathedral, Bendigo by Richard Ryan
- Consecration: 31 July 1962 at Sacred Heart Cathedral, Bendigo by Bernard Denis Stewart

Personal details
- Born: Francis Xavier Thomas; 28 March 1906 Bendigo, Victoria, Australia
- Died: 5 August 1985 (aged 79) Geraldton, Western Australia, Australia
- Denomination: Catholic Church
- Occupation: Catholic bishop
- Education: Corpus Christi College, Melbourne
- Motto: De Te Vivere ("To live by thee")

Francis Xavier Thomas (28 March 1906 – 5 August 1985) was an Australian Roman Catholic bishop who served as the fifth Bishop of Geraldton.

== Early life ==
Thomas was born on 28 March 1906 and grew up in Golden Square, Victoria, a suburb of Bendigo. He was the third son and one of six children born to John Edward Thomas and Clara Ann Thomas. His younger brother Basil also became a priest. He received his early educated from the Sisters of Mercy before becoming a pupil of Marist Brothers College, Bendigo. He entered Corpus Christi College in 1923 to pursue studies for the priesthood. He was among the first students to enter the new college.

== Priesthood ==
On 13 July 1930, Thomas was ordained a priest for the Diocese of Sandhurst at Sacred Heart Cathedral, Bendigo by Richard Ryan. Following his ordination, he continued his studies, gaining a Bachelor of Arts and Diploma of Education from University of Melbourne.

His first appointment was as assistant priest of St Kilian's, Bendigo. He became administrator of the parish in 1946. He also served as Diocesan Director of Schools. In 1955, he was appointed Vicar general of the Diocese. Two years later, he was conferred the honour of Protonotary apostolic by Pope Pius XII.

== Episcopacy ==
On 18 June 1962, Thomas was appointed Bishop of Geraldton, following the death of Bishop Alfred Joseph Gummer in April 1962. He was consecrated a bishop on 31 July 1962 at Sacred Heart Cathedral, Bendigo by Bishop Bernard Denis Stewart.

As bishop, he was faced with the challenge of vast new mining areas opening up across the region, requiring dozens of new churches to be built. At the same time, the number of religious teachers in schools began to decline, forcing the reorganisation and closure of a number of schools.

== Retirement ==
Thomas retired on 13 July 1981 following nearly 20 years of episcopal ministry, having reached the canonical retirement age of 75. In retirement, he would often assist at local parishes. He died peacefully at his private residence in Geraldton on 4 August 1985.

Catholic Church titles
Preceded by Alfred Joseph Gummer	Bishop of Geraldton; 1962–1981	Succeeded by William Joseph Foley
