= John McCarthy (Australian bishop) =

- Bishop of Sandhurst
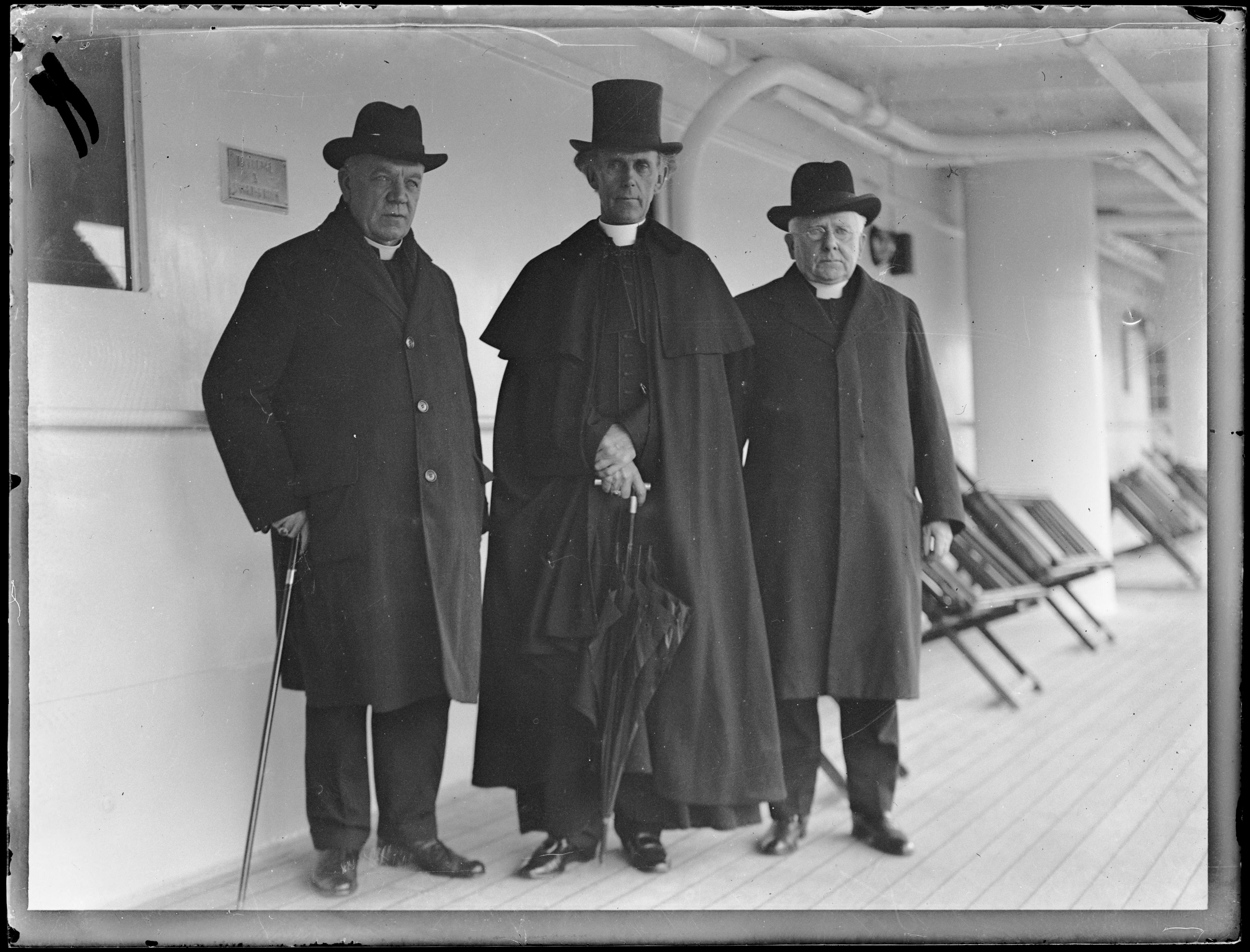
- McCarthy (right) with archbishops Patrick Clune (Perth) and Daniel Mannix (Melbourne) on their return from the 1926 Chicago Eucharistic Conference
- Church: Catholic Church
- Diocese: Diocese of Sandhurst
- In office: 14 February 1917 – 18 August 1950
- Predecessor: Stephen Reville
- Successor: Bernard Denis Stewart

Orders
- Ordination: 15 August 1883 by John McEvilly
- Consecration: 7 June 1917 by Daniel Mannix

Personal details
- Born: 1 November 1858 Formoyle (southeast of Murroogh), County Clare, United Kingdom of Great Britain and Ireland
- Died: 15 August 1950 (aged 91) Bendigo, Victoria, Australia, British Empire

John McCarthy DD (1 November 1858 – 18 August 1950) was an Irish-born Roman Catholic priest who served as Bishop of Sandhurst in Victoria, Australia, from 1917 until his death in 1950. John McCarthy was born in Fermoyle, Co. Clare, educated at Ballyvaughan and St Flannan's College, the Killaloe diocesan college, in Ennis before going to the Irish College in Paris from 1877 until 1883, studying theology and philosophy, he was ordained a priest in 1883. He served as a priest in Galway, Ireland, before 1890 when he moved to Melbourne, Australia. He served in the Woodend and St Kilda parishes before becoming private secretary to Archbishop Carr.

In 1917 he was ordained Bishop of Sandhurst, succeeding another Irish-born bishop Dr. Stephen Reville. In 1933 he celebrated his golden jubilee as a priest.

He died at the Bishop's House, St Kilian's, Bendigo, in 1950.
