= John Ahern Torpie =

Australian Roman Catholic prelate (1910–2000)

His Excellency John Ahern Torpie
- Bishop of Cairns
- Metropolis: Brisbane
- Installed: 14 September 1967
- Term ended: 5 August 1985
- Predecessor: Thomas Cahill
- Successor: John Bathersby

Orders
- Ordination: 25 November 1934 by James Duhig
- Consecration: 30 November 1967 by Patrick Mary O'Donnell

Personal details
- Born: 6 August 1910 Gympie
- Died: 30 December 2000 (aged 90) Brisbane
- Motto: In Deo sperans

John Ahern Torpie (6 August 1910 – 30 December 2000) was an Australian Roman Catholic prelate. He was appointed bishop of Bishop of Cairns from 1967 to 1985. He was the first Catholic bishop to visit Torres Strait Islands. He died in Brisbane on 30 December 2000 at the age of 90.

Catholic Church titles
Preceded by Thomas Cahill	Bishop of Cairns; 1967–1985	Succeeded by John Bathersby
