= Diocese of Sandhurst =

Latin Catholic territory in Australia

Diocese of Sandhurst Dioecesis Sandhurstensis
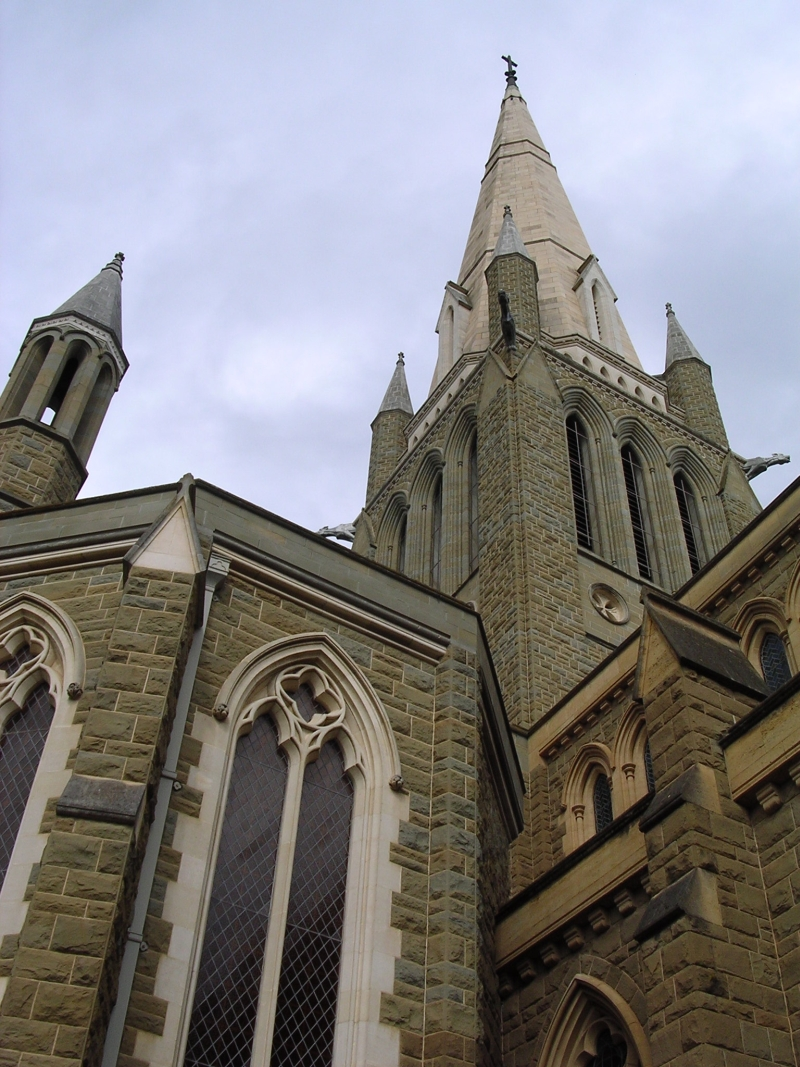
- Sacred Heart Cathedral, Bendigo

Location
- Country: Australia
- Ecclesiastical province: Melbourne
- Coordinates: 36°45′17″S 144°17′07″E

Statistics
- Area: 45,178 km^{2} (17,443 sq mi)
- Population: Total; Catholics: (as of 2004); ▲341,850; ▲91,400 ( 26.7%)
- Parishes: 41

Information
- Denomination: Catholic Church
- Sui iuris church: Latin Church
- Rite: Roman Rite
- Established: 30 March 1874
- Cathedral: Sacred Heart Cathedral, Bendigo

Current leadership
- Pope: Leo XIV
- Bishop: Rene Ramirez (bishop-elect)
- Metropolitan Archbishop: Peter Comensoli
- Bishops emeritus: Les Tomlinson

Map

Website
- sandhurst.catholic.org.au

The Diocese of Sandhurst is a Latin Church ecclesiastical jurisdiction or diocese of the Catholic Church in Australia. It is a suffragan in the ecclesiastical province of the metropolitan Archdiocese of Melbourne. The Diocese of Sandhurst was erected in 1874 and covers the central and north-east regions of Victoria, including Bendigo.

Sacred Heart Cathedral in Bendigo is the seat of the Bishop of Sandhurst. On 3 February 2012, the Vatican announced the appointment of Les Tomlinson as the seventh Bishop of Sandhurst. He was installed in a liturgical ceremony on 1 March 2012.

On 23 July 2019, Shane Mackinlay was announced as the next Bishop of Sandhurst. Bishop Mackinlay was translated by papal bull of Pope Leo XIV and installed as the seventh Archbishop of Brisbane at the Cathedral of St Stephen, Brisbane, on 11 September 2025. The see of Sandhurst is currently vacant.

== History ==
The Diocese of Sandhurst was established on 30 March 1874, from the Diocese of Melbourne. When the Diocese of Melbourne was made an archdiocese, the Diocese of Sandhurst became one of its suffragans. Both dioceses are within the Ecclesiastical Province of Melbourne.

By 1911, the diocese had Augustinian Fathers, Marist Brothers, Sisters of Mercy, Sisters of St. Brigid, Sisters of St. Joseph, Presentation Sisters, Faithful Companions of Jesus and Good Shepherd Sisters.

Construction of the Sacred Heart Cathedral began in 1885 under Bishop Crane. Its organ was installed in 1905, under Stephen Reville. The cathedral was completed in 1977 under Bernard Stewart. Sacred Heart Cathedral is one of the largest Neo-Gothic or Gothic Revival cathedrals in Australia and its construction was largely made possible by the estate of the Paderborn-born German pioneer priest Henry Backhaus, the first Roman Catholic priest on the goldfields of Bendigo.

== Bishops ==
Bishops of Sandhurst:

Order	Name	Date enthroned	Reign ended	Term of office	Reason for term end
1	Martin Crane †	4 August 1874	21 October 1901	27 years, 78 days	Died in office
2	Stephen Reville †	21 October 1901	18 September 1916	14 years, 333 days	Died in office
3	John McCarthy †	14 February 1917	18 August 1950	33 years, 185 days	Died in office
4	Bernard Denis Stewart †	18 August 1950	21 April 1979	28 years, 246 days	Retired and appointed Bishop Emeritus of Sandhurst
5	Noel Desmond Daly †	21 April 1979	1 July 2000	21 years, 71 days	Resigned and appointed Bishop Emeritus of Sandhurst
6	Joseph Grech †	8 March 2001	28 December 2010	9 years, 295 days	Died in office
7	Les Tomlinson	1 March 2012	23 July 2019	7 years, 142 days	Retired and appointed Bishop Emeritus of Sandhurst
8	Shane Mackinlay	16 October 2019	12 June 2025	7 years, 21 days	Appointed Archbishop of Brisbane
9	Rene Ramirez	30 July 2026 (scheduled)			

Following the death in office of Joseph Grech, Frank Marriott, the administrator of Sacred Heart Cathedral, was appointed to serve as administrator of the diocese. On 3 February 2012, Marriott announced that Pope Benedict XVI had appointed Les Tomlinson as the next bishop. Tomlinson's installation took place on 1 March 2012.

=== Coadjutor bishops ===
- Stephen Reville † (1885–1901)
- Bernard Denis Stewart † (1946–1950)

=== Priests of the diocese who became bishops ===
- Hugh Edward Ryan † - appointed Bishop of Townsville in 1938
- Thomas Vincent Cahill † - appointed Bishop of Cairns in 1948
- Francis Xavier Thomas † - appointed Bishop of Geraldton in 1962
- Francis Peter de Campo † - appointed Coadjutor Bishop of Port Pirie in 1979

== Other information ==
The diocese comprises the area north of the Great Dividing Range, south of the Murray River and east of the Loddon River, an area of 45,178 km^{2} (17,450 sq mls). The diocese is divided into 41 parishes and has 74 priests, 109 religious sisters and 5 brothers. The diocese had a Catholic population of about 86,000 in 2006.

There are 50 Catholic schools in the diocese – 40 primary, nine secondary and one P–10 school – catering for 7,700 primary and 5,850 secondary students. Bendigo's oldest Catholic church is St Kilian's.

Saint Augustine's Church, Myers Flat, is the oldest Roman Catholic church building in the Diocese of Sandhurst. The church was built by John O'Brien and consecrated by Dean Hayes in 1864.

== See also ==
- Roman Catholicism in Australia
- Anglican Diocese of Bendigo
