= William Joseph Brennan =

William Joseph Brennan may refer to:

- William J. Brennan Jr. (1906–1997), American judge
- William Joseph Brennan (bishop) (1904–1975), Roman Catholic priest in Australia
