= James Patrick Carroll =

Australian Catholic bishop (1908–1995)

The Most Reverend James Patrick Carroll
- Auxiliary Bishop Emeritus of Archdiocese of Sydney
- Archdiocese: Sydney
- See: Amasea
- Installed: 24 February 1954
- Term ended: 23 July 1984
- Other posts: Titular Archbishop of Amasea (1965–1995); Titular Bishop of Atenia (1954–1965)+

Orders
- Ordination: 30 May 1931 at Archbasilica of Saint John Lateran by Giuseppe Palica
- Consecration: 24 February 1954 at St Mary's Cathedral, Sydney by Norman Thomas Gilroy

Personal details
- Born: James Patrick Carroll; 3 December 1908 Enmore, New South Wales, Australia
- Died: 14 January 1995 (aged 86) Darlinghurst, New South Wales, Australia
- Buried: Matraville, New South Wales, Australia
- Denomination: Catholic Church
- Occupation: Catholic bishop
- Education: Pontifical Irish College; Pontifical Gregorian University

James Patrick Carroll (3 December 1908 – 14 January 1995) was an Australian bishop of the Catholic Church. He served as Auxiliary Bishop of Sydney for more than 30 years and was given the title of Archbishop in 1965.

== Early life ==
Carroll was born in Enmore to Edward and Agnes Carroll. He attended St Pius' Catholic Primary School, Enmore before joining St Joseph's Boys Primary School in Newtown, run by the Christian Brothers. He then attended Christian Brothers' High School, Lewisham. He began his priestly formation at St Columba's College, Springwood in 1926 before moving to St Patrick's Seminary, Manly in 1928. In 1930, he was sent to the Pontifical Irish College in Rome. While studying in Rome, he developed a lifetime passion for opera.

== Priesthood ==
Carroll was ordained on 30 May 1931 at the Archbasilica of Saint John Lateran by Archbishop Giuseppe Palica. He remained in Rome until 1935 while he completed a degree in canon law at the Pontifical Gregorian University.

When he returning to Sydney in 1935, he was appointed assistant priest at Balmain. He then transferred to Darlinghurst before being appointed to professor of philosophy at St Columba's College, Springwood in 1937. He then moved to St Patrick's Seminary, Manly where he served until 1942. He was appointed parish priest of Chatswood in 1943 and then parish priest of Enmore in 1944. In 1947, he became the chief judge of the matrimonial tribunal of the Archdiocese of Sydney.

In April 1949, Carroll was appointed a Domestic Prelate and given the title of Monsignor. Following his elevation, he accompanied Cardinal Norman Thomas Gilroy on overseas trips to Japan, India, New Zealand and Philippines through the early 1950s.

== Episcopate ==
On 6 January 1954, Carroll was appointed Auxiliary Bishop of Sydney and Titular Bishop of Atenia by Pope Pius XII. He was consecrated on 24 February 1954 by Cardinal Norman Thomas Gilroy at St Mary's Cathedral, Sydney.

In 1958, he was appointed parish priest of Woollahra where he would serve for more than three decades.

On 15 October 1965, he was promoted to be a titular Archbishop by Pope Paul VI.

As a bishop, he formed strong ties with the Australian Labor Party, holding close counsel with Premier Joseph Cahill and Reg Downing, Attorney General of New South Wales. He was a key contributor to Catholic education and was a key figure in helping to negotiate Government support for private schools.

Carroll rarely took holidays although he often attended cricket and football matches at the Sydney Cricket Ground and attended ballet and opera performances.

== Retirement and Death ==
On 23 July 1984, Carroll retired as Auxiliary Bishop of Sydney but continued as parish priest of Woollahra until 1991. Carroll died on 14 January 1995 following a stroke in the Woollahra presbytery the day before. His funeral at St Mary's Cathedral, Sydney was attended by the governor-general, current and former prime ministers and premiers, ministers for education, and other community leaders.

His contribution to education in the Archdiocese of Sydney is remembered at Australian Catholic University's North Sydney Campus where a building is named in his honour.

Catholic Church titles
Preceded by –	Auxiliary Bishop of Sydney; 1954–1984	Succeeded by –
Preceded by Gaetano Malchiodi	Titular Archbishop of Amasea; 1965–1995	Succeeded by –
Preceded by Patrick Joseph McCormick	Titular Bishop of Atenia; 1954–1965	Succeeded by Peter Seiichi Shirayanagi
