= David Cremin =

Irish-born Australian Catholic prelate (born 1930)

The Most Reverend David Cremin
- Auxiliary Bishop Emeritus of Sydney
- Church: Catholic Church
- Archdiocese: Sydney
- Appointed: 25 October 1973
- Term ended: 22 February 2005
- Other post: Titular Bishop of Cunga Féichin

Orders
- Ordination: 12 June 1955 by John Joseph Scanlan
- Consecration: 19 January 1974 by James Darcy Freeman

Personal details
- Born: David Cremin; 22 February 1930 (age 96) Ballydoorty, County Limerick, Ireland
- Denomination: Catholic Church

David Cremin (born 22 February 1930) is an Irish-born Australian Roman Catholic prelate, who served as an auxiliary bishop of the Roman Catholic Archdiocese of Sydney (1973–2005).

== Biography ==
Cremim was born in Ballydoorty, County Limerick, Ireland. He was taught by the Jesuits in Limerick, and attended the Seminary of All Hallows College in Dublin. He was ordained a priest on 12 June 1955 by John Joseph Scanlan. On 25 October 1973 he was appointed Titular Bishop of Cunga Féichin and Auxiliary Bishop of his home diocese. He was ordained a bishop on 19 January 1974. The Principal Consecrator was Cardinal James Darcy Freeman; his Principal Co-Consecrators were James Knox and Bishop Thomas Cahill. He retired from his post on 22 February 2005.
