= Alfred Gummer =

Australian Catholic bishop (1899–1962

The Most Reverend Alfred Joseph Gummer
- Bishop of Diocese of Geraldton
- Diocese: Geraldton
- Installed: 19 March 1942
- Term ended: 5 April 1962
- Predecessor: James Patrick O'Collins
- Successor: Francis Xavier Thomas

Orders
- Ordination: 31 March 1923 at Rome by Giuseppe Palica
- Consecration: 19 March 1942 at Cathedral of St Michael and St John, Bathurst by Norman Thomas Gilroy

Personal details
- Born: Alfred Joseph Gummer; 18 March 1899 Perthville, New South Wales, Australia
- Died: 5 April 1962 (aged 63) Geraldton, Perth, Australia
- Denomination: Catholic Church
- Occupation: Catholic bishop
- Education: St Columba's College, Sringwood; St Patrick's Seminary, Manly; Pontificio Collegio Urbano de Propaganda Fide
- Motto: Nos Autem in Nomine Domini ("We, however, in the name of the Lord")

Alfred Joseph Gummer (18 March 1899 − 2 April 1962) was an Australian Roman Catholic bishop who served as Bishop of Geraldton for 20 years.

== Early life ==
Gummer was born in Perthville, New South Wales, a small town located just outside Bathurst. He was the fourth son and one of eight children born to Oliver and Mary Gummer. Oliver had been born in Bristol, England and came to Australia as a young man. Mary was born in County Clare, Ireland and also came to Australia at an early age. One of his sisters joined the Sisters of St Joseph. He came from a highly religious family, with one of his nephews becoming a Passionist priest, one niece becoming a Sister of Charity and one nephew becoming a Christian Brother.

He received his early education at St Joseph's Convent, Perthville before moving to Sydney to pursue his priestly studies at St Columba's College, Springwood. He then continued his studies at St Patrick's Seminary, Manly. In 1918, he was sent to Rome to continue his studies at the Pontificio Collegio Urbano de Propaganda Fide. He was awarded a Doctor of Divinity upon completion of his studies.

== Priesthood ==
On 31 March 1923, Easter Saturday, Gummer was ordained as a priest for the Diocese of Bathurst in Rome by Archbishop Giuseppe Palica, Vicegerent of Rome. Following his ordination, he spent time touring Europe, visiting Switzerland, Germany, Florence, Belgium, England and Ireland before returning to Australia in October 1923.

His first appointment was as an assistant priest at Dubbo. In 1926, he was appointed to Orange and also became the Diocesan Inspector of Schools and Diocesan Secretary. He then moved to Wellington before being appointed parish priest of Oberon in 1933.

== Episcopate ==
On 24 February 1942, Gummer was appointed the fourth Bishop of Geraldton, following the appointment of Bishop James Patrick O’Collins as Bishop of Ballarat.

He was consecrated a bishop on 19 March 1942 at Cathedral of St Michael and St John, Bathurst by Archbishop Norman Thomas Gilroy. He travelled to Geraldton and arrived in his new diocese on 28 March 1942.

His consecration and arrival in Geraldton was accelerated due to the fact the Diocese was under threat of Japanese invasion amid World War II. By the time of his consecration, Japan had bombed Darwin and Broome.

Over the next few years of his episcopacy, he had to content with the absence of servicemen during war and their eventual return and resettlement. He also had to deal with the wave of post-war migration. Young orphan girls from Britain were sent to Nazareth House in Geraldton following World War II. The Diocese also took in a large number of migrants from England and Malta to Christian Brothers Agricultural School in Tardun.

== Death ==
Gummer died in Geraldton on 5 April 1962 at the age of 63. While he had been in ill-health for some years, he had shown signs of recovery just prior to his sudden passing. He is buried in Geraldton Cemetery and Crematorium.

Catholic Church titles
Preceded by James Patrick O'Collins	Bishop of Geraldton; 1942–1962	Succeeded by Francis Xavier Thomas
