= Launcelot Goody =

Australian metropolitan bishop

The Most Reverend Sir Launcelot Goody KBE
- 6th Roman Catholic Archbishop of Perth
- Province: Perth
- Diocese: Archdiocese of Perth
- Installed: 18 October 1968
- Term ended: 26 October 1983
- Predecessor: Redmond Prendiville
- Successor: William Foley
- Other post: Bishop of Bunbury (1954–1968)

Orders
- Ordination: 20 December 1930 (Priest) in Rome
- Consecration: 1 November 1951 (Bishop)

Personal details
- Born: Launcelot John Goody; 5 June 1908 London, England
- Died: 13 May 1992 (aged 83) Perth, Western Australia
- Denomination: Roman Catholic Church
- Parents: Ernest John Goody and Agnes Goody (nee Buckeridge)
- Occupation: Roman Catholic bishop
- Profession: Cleric
- Motto: Consilium custodiat (Prudence guard him)

Launcelot John Goody KBE (5 June 1908 – 13 May 1992), an Australian metropolitan bishop, was the sixth Roman Catholic Archbishop of Perth, serving from 1968 to 1983. Prior to his election as Archbishop of Perth, Goody served as the inaugural Bishop of Bunbury from 1954 to 1968.

== Early years and background ==
When Goody was aged eight years, together with his parents he migrated to Australia from England due to his father starting to feel the effects of creeping spinal paralysis. The family arrived in Perth and were met by representatives of Archbishop Patrick Clune, having converted from Anglicanism to Catholicism some years yearlier.

Goody was ordained a priest in Rome by Archbishop Giuseppe Palica on 20 December 1930 in Rome, aged 22.

On 2 August 1951 he was appointed Auxiliary Bishop of Perth, as well as Titular Bishop of Abydus, and was consecrated three months later. His episcopal motto was Consilium custodiat.

== Bishop and Archbishop ==
On 12 November 1954, aged 46, he was appointed the first Roman Catholic Bishop of Bunbury, in Western Australia. On 18 October 1968, aged 60, he was appointed Archbishop of Perth, Australia. During his time as a prelate, Goody attended all four sessions of the Second Vatican Council.

Retiring on 26 October 1983, Goody was appointed Archbishop Emeritus of Perth; until his death on 13 May 1992, aged 83.

== Honours ==
Goody became a Knight Commander of the Order of the British Empire for service to the Roman Catholic Church as part of the 1977 New Year's Honour List (effective 31 December 1976). He personally received the accolade from Queen Elizabeth II during her Silver Jubilee visit to Australia in 1977. The L J Goody Bioethics Centre, an agency of the Roman Catholic Archdiocese of Perth, was founded in 1985 and named in honour of Goody.

Catholic Church titles
Preceded by newly erected Diocese	1st Catholic Bishop of Bunbury; 1954–1968	Succeeded by Myles McKeon
Preceded by Redmond Prendiville	6th Catholic Archbishop of Perth; 1968–1983	Succeeded by William Foley
