= Stephen Reville =

Irish member of the Augustinian Order, Bishop of Sandhurst, Victoria (Australia)

Stephen Reville O.E.S.A.
- Bishop of Sandhurst
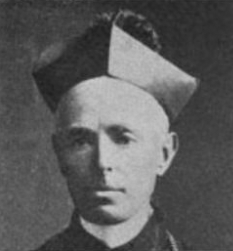
- Church: Catholic Church
- Diocese: Diocese of Sandhurst
- In office: 21 October 1901 – 19 September 1916
- Predecessor: Martin Crane
- Successor: John McCarthy
- Previous posts: Titular Bishop of Ceramus (1885-1901); Coadjutor Bishop of Sandhurst (1885-1901)

Orders
- Ordination: 8 September 1867 by Thomas Furlong
- Consecration: 29 March 1885 by James Alipius Goold

Personal details
- Born: 9 May 1844 Tagunnan (north of Ballycogley), County Wexford, United Kingdom of Great Britain and Ireland
- Died: 19 September 1916 (aged 72) Bendigo, Victoria, Australia, British Empire

Stephen Reville D.D., O.S.A. KGCHS (9 May 1844 – 19 September 1916) was a Bishop of Sandhurst, of Victoria.

== Biography ==
Reville was born in Wexford on 9 May 1844. He entered the Augustinian order at Callan, and studied on the continent, taking the degree of Master in Philosophy and Sacred Theology at Ghent. Soon after his ordination in 1867, he was appointed President of St Laurence's Seminary, at Usher's Quay. Holding the office for seven years.

He accompanied the first Bishop of Sandhurst, Martin Crane, to Australia in 1875. However, the prelate's eyesight was deteriorating, therefore, Reville was appointed Coadjutor-Bishop, having previously held the office of Vicar-General and acted as administrator of the diocese from 1882 during Dr. Crane's absence. He was consecrated on 29 March 1885.

Reville became bishop on 21 October 1901. He was a Knight of the Equestrian Order of the Holy Sepulchre.

He died in Bendigo on 19 September 1916.
