= Thomas Cahill (bishop) =

Australian Roman Catholic bishop

His Grace The Most Reverend Thomas Cahill
- 3rd Archbishop of Canberra and Goulburn
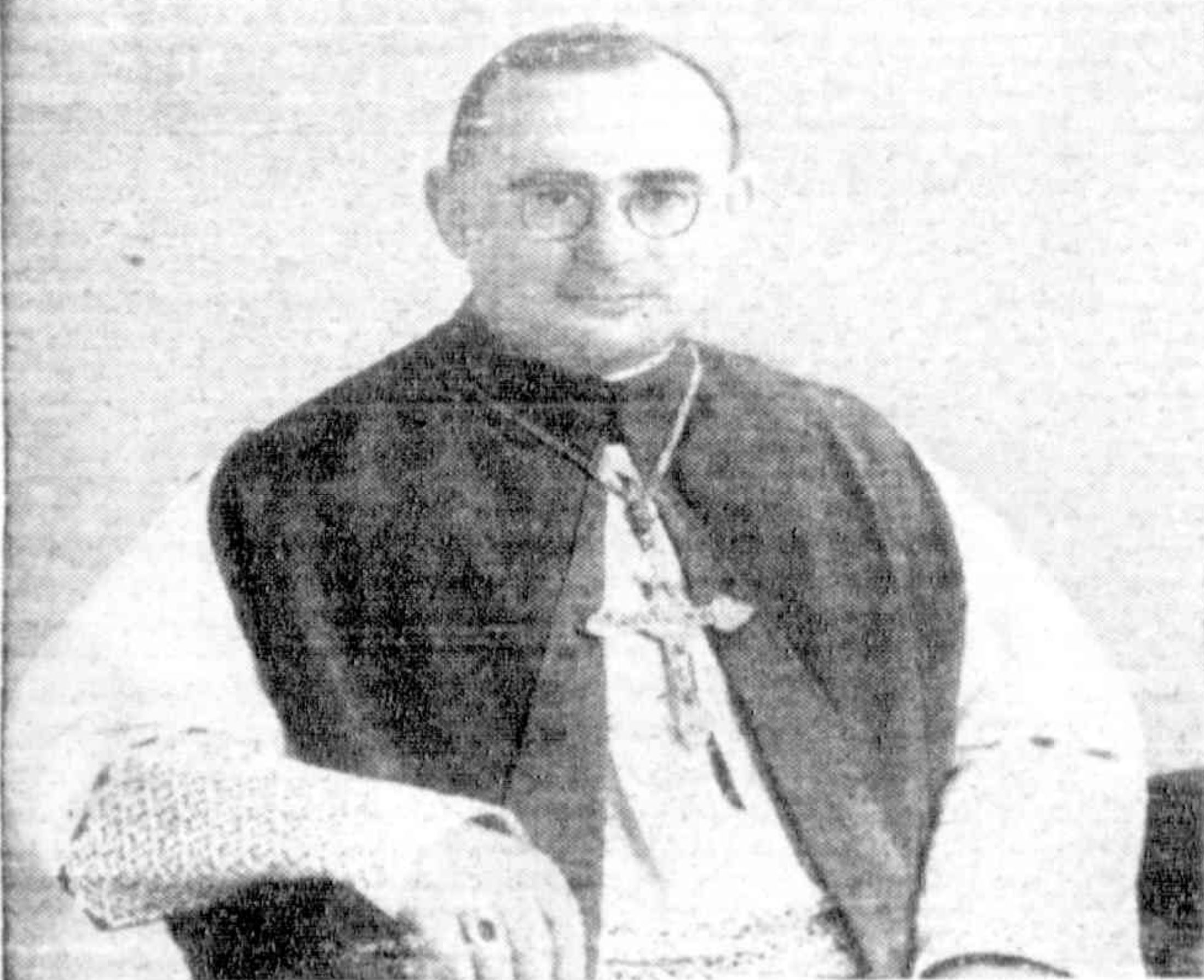
- Church: Catholic Church
- Archdiocese: Archdiocese of Canberra and Goulburn
- Province: Immediately Subject to the Holy See
- See: Canberra and Goulburn
- Installed: 13 April 1967
- Term ended: 16 April 1978
- Predecessor: Eris O'Brien
- Successor: Edward Clancy
- Previous post: Bishop of Cairns (1949-1967)

Orders
- Ordination: 21 September 1935, Sacred Heart Cathedral by Giuseppe Palica
- Consecration: 9 February 1949, Sacred Heart Cathedral by Norman Gilroy, Archbishop of Sydney

Personal details
- Born: Thomas Vincent Cahill; 22 February 1913 Bendigo, Victoria
- Died: April 16, 1978 (aged 65) Darlinghurst
- Buried: St Christopher's Cathedral, Canberra
- Denomination: Roman Catholic
- Occupation: Cleric
- Profession: Roman Catholic
- Motto: glorificetur deus (May God Be Glorified)

Styles of Thomas Cahill
- Reference style: His Grace, The Most Reverend
- Spoken style: Your Grace
- Religious style: Archbishop

Thomas Vincent Cahill (22 February 1913 – 16 April 1978) was an Australian Roman Catholic bishop.

== Early life ==
Thomas Vincent Cahill was born on 22 February 1913 in Bendigo, Victoria.

== Ordained ministry ==
Cahill was ordained a priest on 21 September 1935 at the age of 22 and appointed a priest of the Diocese of Sandhurst in Bendigo. He was consecrated a bishop shortly before his 36th birthday on 9 February 1949 and appointed Bishop of Cairns in Queensland. At the age of 54, he was appointed Archbishop of Canberra and Goulburn in New South Wales on 13 April 1967.

== Later life ==
Still serving as archbishop, Cahill died of a heart attack in St Vincent's Hospital in Darlinghurst, Sydney, at the age of 65 on 16 April 1978. He had been admitted to hospital when his health deteriorated during the previous week, having been working hard at his desk until he was taken to hospital.

His funeral was held at St Christopher's Cathedral at Manuka in Canberra on 19 April 1978, conducted by the Archbishop of Sydney, James Freeman. After the funeral, Cahill was privately buried in the crypt of the Cathedral.
