= Eugene Cuskelly =

Australian Catholic bishop (1924–1999)

The Most Reverend Eugene Cuskelly MSC
- Auxiliary Bishop Emeritus of Archdiocese of Brisbane
- Archdiocese: Brisbane
- Installed: 21 July 1982
- Term ended: 29 April 1996
- Other post: Titular Bishop of Altinum (1982–1996)

Orders
- Ordination: 18 December 1948 at Rome by Alfonso Carinci
- Consecration: 21 July 1982 at Cathedral of St Stephen, Brisbane by Francis Roberts Rush

Personal details
- Born: Eugene James Cuskelly; 6 January 1924 Oakey, Queensland, Australia
- Died: 21 March 1999 (aged 75) Brisbane, Queensland, Australia
- Buried: Nudgee, Queensland, Australia
- Denomination: Catholic Church
- Occupation: Catholic bishop

Eugene James Cuskelly (6 January 1924 – 21 March 1999) was an Australian bishop of the Catholic Church. He was superior general of the Missionaries of the Sacred Heart for more than a decade and served as Auxiliary Bishop of Brisbane more 14 years.

== Early life ==
Cuskelly was born in Oakey, Queensland to Francis and Mary Cuskelly who had married three years prior. He attended Downlands College, Toowoomba, run by the He joined the Missionaries of the Sacred Heart in 1941. In 1947, he was chosen to pursue his ecclesiastical studies in Rome.

== Priesthood ==
On 18 December 1948, Cuskelly was ordained in Rome by Archbishop Alfonso Carinci as a priest for the Missionaries of the Sacred Heart. Following ordination, he remained in Rome to obtain his Doctor of Divinity. He returned to Australia in 1951.

In 1969, he was became Superior General of the Missionaries of the Sacred Heart and served in this role until 1981.

== Episcopate ==
On 17 May 1982, he was appointed Auxiliary Bishop of Brisbane and Titular Bishop of Altinum by Pope John Paul II. He was consecrated as a bishop of 21 July 1982.

== Retirement and Death ==
Cuskelly retired on 29 April 1996. He had not yet reached the canonical retirement age of 75. He lived in poor health for a number of years after retirement and died on 21 March 1999 following a long battle with cancer, in the care of the Sisters of St Joseph at Nundah.

Catholic Church titles
Preceded by –	Auxiliary Bishop of Brisbane; 1982–1999	Succeeded by –
Preceded by Libero Tresoldi	Titular Bishop of Altinum; 1982–1999	Succeeded by Pius Mlungisi Dlungwane
