= Redmond Prendiville =

Metropolitan bishop

The Most Reverend Redmond Prendiville
- 5th Roman Catholic Archbishop
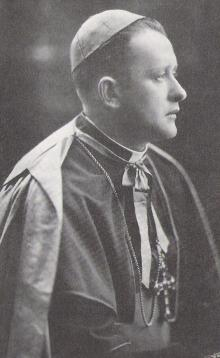
- Archbishop Redmond Prendiville
- Province: Perth
- Diocese: Archdiocese of Perth
- Installed: 24 May 1935
- Term ended: 28 June 1968
- Predecessor: Patrick Clune
- Successor: Lancelot Goody

Orders
- Ordination: 14 June 1925 (Priest) in St Kieran's College, Kilkenny, Ireland
- Consecration: 22 October 1933 (Bishop)

Personal details
- Born: Redmond Garrett Prendiville; 11 September 1900 Wood, County Kerry, Ireland
- Died: 28 June 1968 (aged 67) Perth, Western Australia
- Buried: Karrakatta Cemetery. Exhumed 2009 and re-interred Saturday 5 December 2009, 10am in St Mary's Cathedral, Perth
- Denomination: Roman Catholic Church
- Occupation: Roman Catholic bishop
- Profession: Cleric
- Education: University College Dublin, National University of Ireland; St Peter's College, Wexford
- Motto: Da anima cetera tolle (Nothing else matters except for the salvation of souls)

Count Redmond Garrett Prendiville (11 September 1900 – 28 June 1968) a former Australian metropolitan bishop, was the fifth bishop and second Roman Catholic Archbishop of the Archdiocese of Perth. In 1933, at the time of his consecration, aged 32, Prendiville was reputedly the youngest-ever Catholic archbishop.

== Education ==
Prendiville began his studies for the priesthood 1918, getting himself expelled from All Hallows College, Dublin, in 1924 for going awol to play football for Kerry in the All-Ireland final. He studied philosophy and history at University College Dublin (B.A., 1922, National University of Ireland), and theology at St Peter's College, Wexford (1921–25).

== Career ==
Selected for the Kerry Gaelic football team in 1924, Mundy, as Redmond was called, played in the 1924 All-Ireland Senior Football Championship Final and was named 'man of the match'. He was ordained priest at St. Kieran's College, Kilkenny, on 11 June 1925.

Prendiville emigrated to Perth in 1925 and was appointed to the cathedral parish of St. Mary's. In 1929, he was appointed administrator of the Cathedral parish.

=== Archbishop of Perth ===
On 22 October 1933, after only eight years as a priest, Prendiville was consecrated titular Archbishop of Cypsela and coadjutor Archbishop of Perth. In 1935, he succeeded Archbishop Patrick Clune as fifth bishop and second archbishop of Perth. He was named bishop assistant at the Papal throne and Count of the Holy See in 1958.

Prendiville was also responsible for establishing up St Thomas More College at the University of Western Australia which was officially opened in 1957.

== Personal life ==
He suffered two strokes in 1946 which left one of his arms partially paralysed. He was frequently admitted to hospital over the ensuing years. He suffered an aortic lesion and died of a cerebrovascular accident on 28 June 1968 at St John of God Hospital, Subiaco. Following a requiem Mass at St Mary's Cathedral, he was buried in Karrakatta Cemetery. He was exhumed in 2009 and reinterred in the crypt of St Mary's Cathedral, Perth, on 5 December 2009.

== Legacy ==
Prendiville Catholic College in Ocean Reef Western Australia is named after the Archbishop.

== See also ==
- Catholic bishops and archbishops of Perth, Western Australia

Catholic Church titles
| Preceded by Patrick Clune | 5th Catholic Archbishop of Perth; 1935–1968 | Succeeded by Lancelot Goody |
