= John Joseph Gerry =

Australian Roman Catholic bishop

The Most Reverend John Joseph Gerry
- Auxiliary bishop of Archdiocese of Brisbane
- Archdiocese: Brisbane
- Installed: 29 July 1975
- Term ended: 11 February 2003
- Other post: Titular Bishop of Lugmad (1975–2017)

Orders
- Ordination: 21 December 1950 at Rome by Pietro Fumasoni Biondi
- Consecration: 29 July 1975 at Cathedral of St Stephen, Brisbane by Francis Roberts Rush

Personal details
- Born: John Joseph Gerry; 1 June 1927 Rosalie, Queensland, Australia
- Died: 13 December 2017 (aged 90) Chermside, Queensland, Australia
- Buried: Nudgee Cemetery & Crematorium, Queensland, Australia
- Denomination: Catholic Church
- Occupation: Catholic bishop
- Education: Pontificio Collegio Urbano de Propaganda Fide
- Motto: "Through Mary One in Christ"

John Joseph Gerry (1 June 1927 – 13 December 2017) was a Roman Catholic bishop, who served as Auxiliary Bishop of Brisbane for more than 27 years.

== Early life ==
Gerry was born in Rosalie, Queensland on 1 June 1927, one of nine children born to.... . His younger brother Frank became a priest for the Society of the Divine Word. He received his primary education from the Sisters of Mercy at the local convent in Rosalie and his secondary education at Marist Brothers College Rosalie.

In 1942, he entered the seminary to study for the priesthood at Pius XII Seminary, Banyo. In 1946, he was chosen to go to Rome to complete his Pontificio Collegio Urbano de Propaganda Fide. He travelled to Europe with 17 other students from Australia, following a request from the Apostolic Delegate to Australian bishops to send their most promising of their seminarians to Rome so that Australia could have locally born bishops.

== Priesthood ==
Gerry was ordained a priest on 21 December 1950 in Rome by Cardinal Pietro Fumasoni Biondi. He was ordained alongside Peter Quinn, who would go on to serve as Bishop of Bunbury.

He returned to Brisbane in 1951 and received his first appointment, assisting at Coolangatta. He later served in the parishes of Burleigh Heads, St Stephen’s Cathedral, and Herston.

In 1962, he was appointed to the new parish of Stafford as parish priest, just as the Second Vatican Council was beginning. He fondly remembered the parish and enjoyed pastoring a community with "no established heirachy" and a community of young families open to the "enthusiasms inspired by the Council". He established a parish council, family groups and a parish credit union, and he welcomed the Sisters of the Holy Family of Nazareth who taught in the neighbouring school.

== Episcopate ==
On 5 June 1975, Gerry was appointed Auxiliary Bishop of Brisbane and Titular Bishop of Lugmad by Pope Paul VI. He was consecrated a bishop on 29 July 1975 at the Cathedral of St Stephen, Brisbane by Archbishop Francis Roberts Rush.

As Bishop, he was appointed Vicar for Social Welfare and chairman of Australian Catholic Relief – now called Caritas Australia. He also developed the blueprints for Centacare. He also served as a member of the Social Welfare and Health Care committees of the Australian Bishops’ Conference and the Christian World Service Commission of the National Council of Churches. Internationally he acted as the Executive of the Federation of Catholic Bishops’ Conferences of Oceania.

== Retirement and death ==
On 11 February 2003, Gerry retired as Auxiliary Bishop of Brisbane, a few months after reaching the canonical retirement age of 75.

He died on 13 December 2017 at Holy Spirit Northside Hospital, Chermside. His funeral was held on 21 December, his ordination date, at Cathedral of St Stephen, Brisbane.
