= Hugh Edward Ryan =

Roman Catholic priest

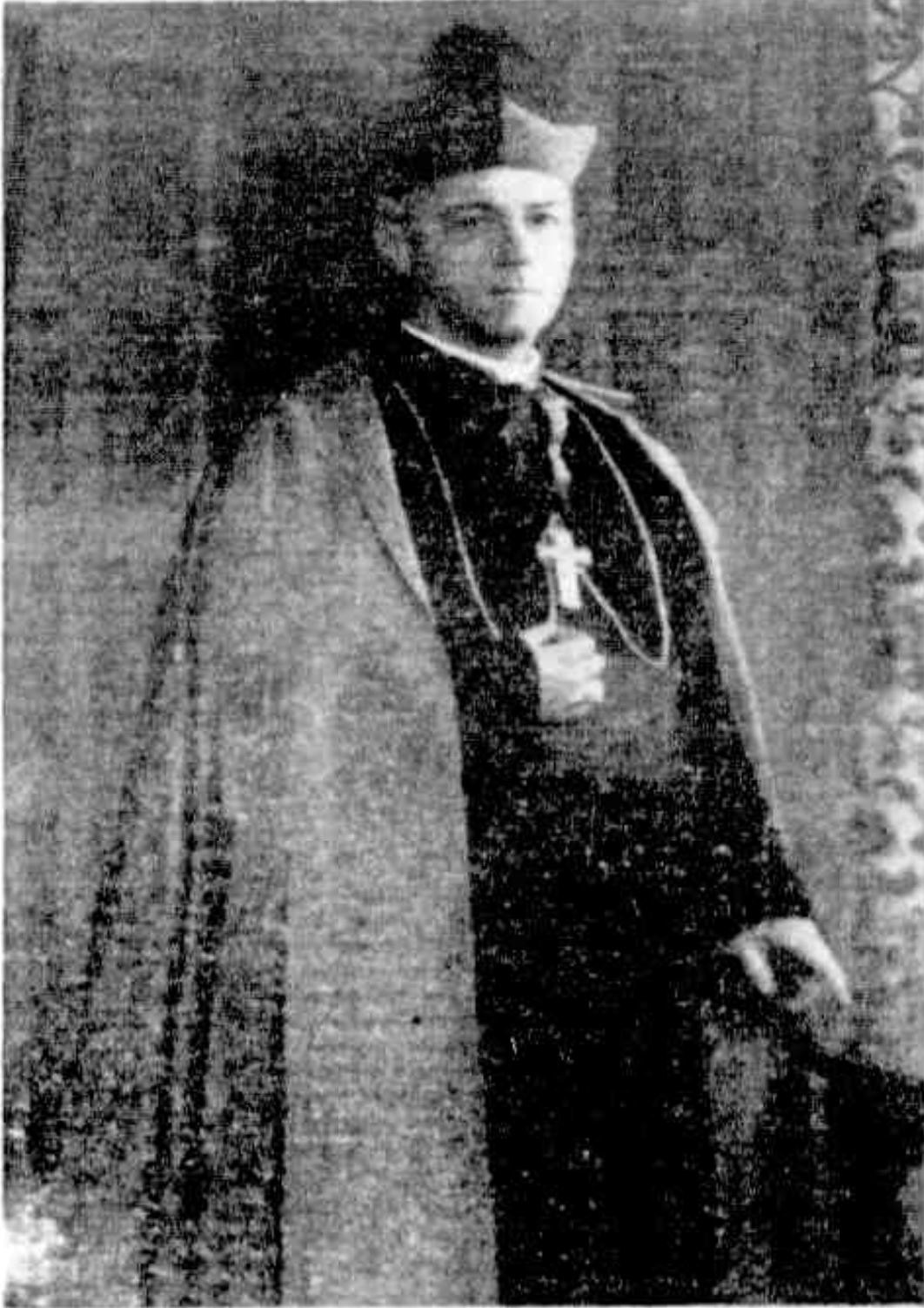
Hugh Edward Ryan, 1953

Hugh Edward Ryan (1888–1977) was a Roman Catholic priest. He was the Roman Catholic Bishop of Townsville in Queensland, Australia, from 13 July 1938 to 14 September 1967.

Ryan was born on 25 April 1888 in Kyabram, Victoria. He studied at St Patrick's Seminary in Manly, Sydney, and in Rome. He was ordained in 1916 for Sandhurst. He was consecrated as Bishop of Townsville on 13 July 1938. He retired on 14 September 1967 and became Bishop Emeritus of Townsville. He died on 13 November 1977.
