= William Foley (bishop) =

Australian archbishop

The Most Reverend William Foley
- 7th Archbishop of Perth
- Province: Perth
- Diocese: Archdiocese of Perth
- Installed: 14 December 1983
- Term ended: 10 February 1991
- Predecessor: Launcelot Goody
- Successor: Barry Hickey
- Other posts: Bishop of Geraldton (1981 – 1983)

Orders
- Ordination: 12 September 1954 at Church of the Holy Rosary, Nedlands by Launcelot John Goody
- Consecration: 9 September 1981 at St Francis Xavier's Cathedral, Geraldton by Norman Thomas Gilroy

Personal details
- Born: William Joseph Foley; 20 June 1931 Leonora, Western Australia
- Died: 10 February 1991 (aged 59) Perth
- Denomination: Roman Catholic Church
- Occupation: Roman Catholic bishop
- Profession: Cleric

William Joseph Foley (20 June 1931 in Nedlands, Western Australia – 10 February 1991 in Perth), an Australian metropolitan bishop, was the seventh Roman Catholic Archbishop of the Archdiocese of Perth, Western Australia, serving from 1983 until his death in 1991. Prior to his election as Archbishop, Foley served as Bishop of Geraldton from 1981 until 1983.

== Early life ==
Foley was born on 20 June 1931, one of four children to Maurice Francis Foley and Augusta Marie Foley. He was educated by the Christian Brothers at Christian Brothers' College, Perth. In 1945, he entered St Charles Seminary, Perth. In 1950, he had the opportunity to read theology at the Missionary College of Brignole-Sale in Genoa, Italy.

== Priesthood ==
Foley returned to Perth for his ordination and was ordained at priest on 12 September 1954 at the Church of the Holy Rosary, Nedlands by Archbishop Launcelot John Goody.

Following his ordination, he worked as assistant priest at Shenton Park and then St Mary's Cathedral, Perth. He became Diocesan Promoter of Vocations in 1969 until he was appointed parish priest of Maddington-Lynwood in 1971. In 1976, he was appointed dean and administrator of St Mary's Cathedral, Perth.

He also served as director of Catholic Migration in Perth during the 1960s and early 1970s.

== Episcopacy ==
=== Geraldton ===
On 13 July 1981, Foley was appointed Bishop of Geraldton by Pope John Paul II. On 9 September 1981, he was consecrated at St Francis Xavier's Cathedral, Geraldton by Bishop Francis Xavier Thomas, his predecessor. His time in the Diocese was only brief however he was able to set up plans for the construction of a new cathedral residence in his two year episcopacy.

=== Perth ===
Following the retirement of Archbishop Launcelot John Goody, Foley was appointed Archbishop of Perth on 26 October 1983. He was formally installed in his new see on 14 December 1983.

As Archbishop, he recognised and embraced the realities of the contemporary Church. He said wanted "to provide the climate in which, the skill of all members of the Church could be fostered and developed."

Foley also played an influential role in founding the University of Notre Dame, to provide teachers and nurses for the Archdiocese's Catholic education and healthcare networks. While he lived to see its establishment on 29 December 1989, he died a few months short of its inauguration on 2 July 1991.

He also managed to keep vocations in the Archdiocese relatively steady despite an overall decline in the number of seminarians both in Australia and across the globe. Upon entering office, the Archdiocese had 18 seminarians studying for the priesthood. At the time of his death in 1991, it had 17.

== Death ==
Foley died suddenly in his sleep on 10 February 1991 at the age of 59. Just one day before, he had attended the Aboriginal cultural festival called ‘Kyana’ at the Esplanade.

== Honours ==
A portrait of the late Archbishop hangs in Foley Hall in The University of Notre Dame, Perth campus, named in his honour in 1993. Foley's family have also established a prize, called the Foley Award in memory of the late Archbishop, given to a student who has made an outstanding contribution to service and to Notre Dame University.

A retirement village in the Perth suburb of Hilton is named in honour of Foley; as well as the Foley Centre, a gymnasium complex at Trinity College, Perth.

Catholic Church titles
Preceded by Francis Xavier Thomas	6th Catholic Bishop of Geraldton; 1981–1983	Succeeded by Barry Hickey
Preceded by Launcelot Goody	7th Catholic Archbishop of Perth; 1983–1991	Succeeded by Barry Hickey
