= Arthur Fox (bishop) =

Australian Catholic bishop (1904–1997)

The Most Reverend Arthur Fox
- Bishop Emeritus of Diocese of Sale
- Diocese: Sale
- Installed: 31 January 1968
- Term ended: 25 February 1981
- Other posts: Auxiliary Bishop of Melbourne (1956–1967); Titular Bishop of Rhinocorura (1956–1967)

Orders
- Ordination: 13 July 1930 at St Patrick's Cathedral, Melbourne by Daniel Mannix
- Consecration: 20 January 1957 at St Patrick's Cathedral, Melbourne by Justin Daniel Simonds

Personal details
- Born: Arthur Francis Fox; 27 August 1904 Melbourne, Victoria, Australia
- Died: 16 February 1997 (aged 92) Blackburn South, Victoria, Australia
- Denomination: Catholic Church
- Occupation: Catholic bishop

Arthur Francis Fox (27 August 1904 – 16 February 1997) was an Australian bishop of the Catholic Church. He served as Auxiliary Bishop of Melbourne before being appointed Bishop of Sale in 1967 and serving there for 13 years.

== Early life ==
Fox was born in East Brunswick, Melbourne, the youngest of seven surviving children of William Robert Fox and Mary. He was educated by Sisters of Mercy at Our Lady Help of Christians School, East Brunswick, then by the Christian Brothers at Parade College. He finished his schooling at St Kevin's College, Melbourne, also run by the Christian Brothers. Three of his sisters joined the Sisters of the Good Shepherd.

On 29 March 1923, Fox was among the first group of seminarians to enter Corpus Christi College, Melbourne.

== Priesthood ==
Fox was ordained as a priest for the Archdiocese of Melbourne on 13 July 1930 by Archbishop Daniel Mannix at St Patrick's Cathedral, Melbourne. Over the next few years, he served in the parishes of Oakleigh, Coburg and East St Kilda, before being appointed assistant priest at St Patrick's Cathedral, Melbourne.

In 1944, he began to take on greater responsibility in the Archdiocese. He was appointed chancellor, cathedral dean, and private secretary to the archbishop in 1944. He then served as vicar general from 1946.

== Episcopate ==
On 11 October 1956, Fox was appointed Auxiliary Bishop of Melbourne and Titular Bishop of Rhinocorura. He was consecrated a bishop on 20 January 1957 by Archbishop Justin Daniel Simonds at St Patricks Cathedral, Melbourne.

As bishop, he was a strong supporter of B. A. Santamaria. in 1960, he declared that a Catholic in good conscience could not vote for the Australian Labor Party because of its failure to oppose the Communist Party of Australia. While he had enjoyed a strong influence under the leadership of Archbishop Mannix, following his death in 1963 and the appointment of Archbishop Justin Simons, his influence waned. He attended some sessions of the Second Vatican Council however his influence here was limited too.

=== Bishop of Sale ===
On 29 November 1967, Fox was appointed Bishop of Sale by Pope Paul VI. He was installed as the fifth Bishop of Sale on 31 January 1968.

He was a consistent campaigner for government funding of Catholic schools, particularly amid an expansion of the Catholic education system and the transition of teaching and schools from religious orders to lay staff. During visits to parishes, he was consistently speaking out against communism, abortion, and artificial contraception.

Fox made a strong contribution to the Diocese during his 13 year episcopate. He helped open a fund to support the education of priests in the Diocese. Seven priests were ordained for Sale under his episcopate and six more which had entered seminary during his time were ordained in the years following his retirement.

== Retirement and Death ==
On 25 February 1981, Fox retired as Bishop of Sale, having submitted his resignation at the age of 75 more than a year earlier. He moved back to Melbourne and in later years was afflicted by complete blindness. He died on 16 February 1997 at South Blackburn and was buried in St Mary's Cathedral, Sale.

Catholic Church titles
Preceded by Patrick Francis Lyons	Bishop of Sale; 1968–1981	Succeeded by Joseph Eric D'Arcy
Preceded by —	Auxiliary Bishop of Melbourne; 1956–1967	Succeeded by —
Preceded by Jean-Jérôme Adam	Titular Bishop of Rhinocorura; 1956–1967	Succeeded by —
