= Sacred Heart Cathedral, Bendigo =

Cathedral of the Roman Catholic Diocese of Sandhurst, Australia

Sacred Heart Cathedral
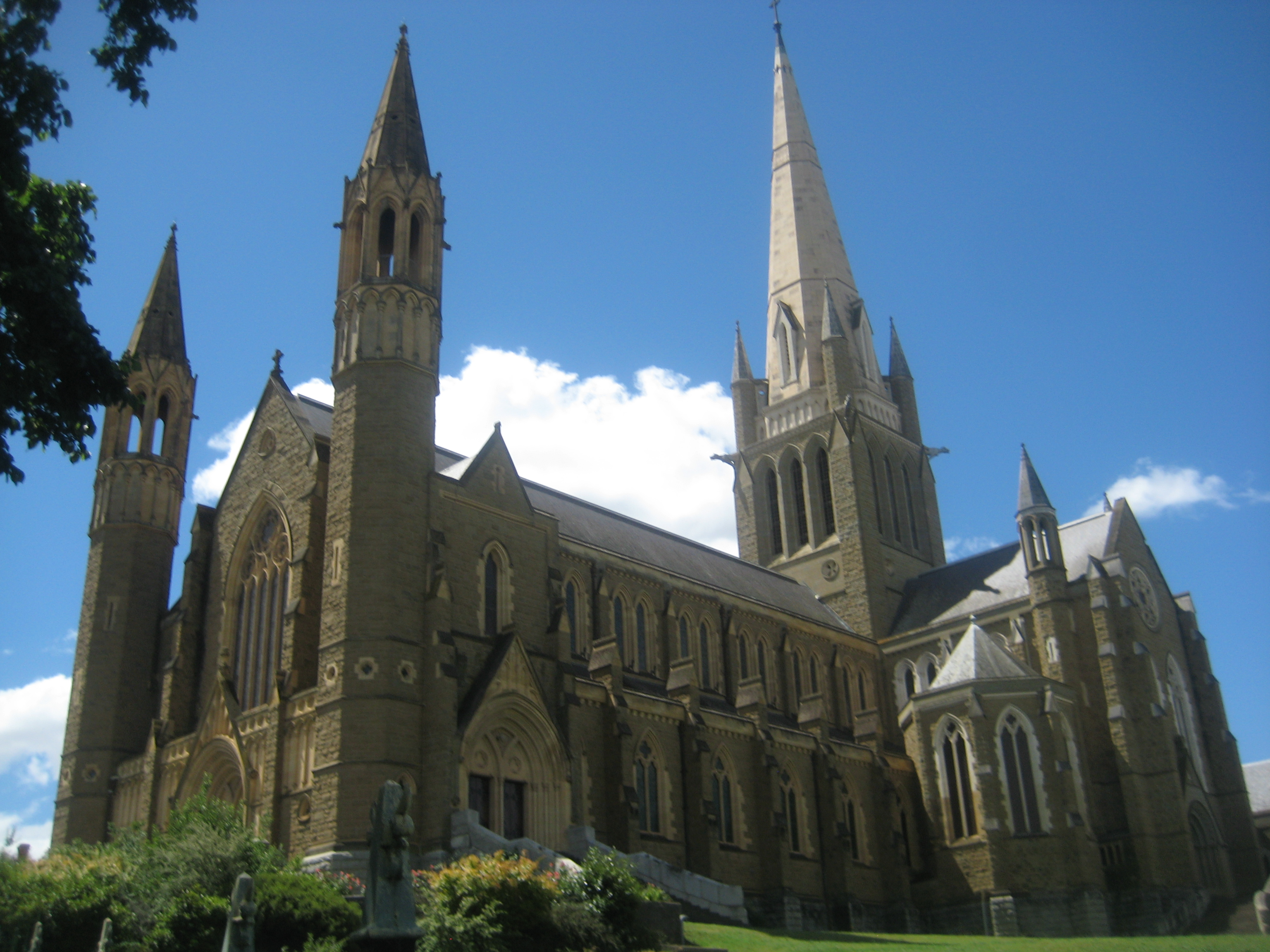
- Sacred Heart Cathedral
- Sacred Heart Cathedral
- 36°45′36″S 144°16′26″E
- Address: 80 Wattle Street, Bendigo, Victoria
- Country: Australia
- Denomination: Catholic Church
- Sui iuris church: Latin Church
- Website: sacredheartcathedral.org.au

History
- Status: Cathedral
- Founded: 1895
- Founder: Martin Crane
- Dedication: Most Sacred Heart of Jesus
- Consecrated: 1901

Architecture
- Functional status: Active
- Architects: William Tappin; Bates, Smart and McCutcheon
- Architectural type: Church
- Style: Gothic Revival
- Years built: 1897 – 1977

Specifications
- Length: 75 metres (246 ft)
- Width: 43 metres (141 ft)
- Height: 87 metres (285 ft)
- Materials: Sandstone

Administration
- Diocese: Sandhurst

Clergy
- Bishop: Shane Mackinlay

Victorian Heritage Register
- Official name: Sacred Heart Cathedral
- Type: State heritage (Religion)
- Designated: 4 September 1997
- Reference no.: 3311

Sacred Heart Cathedral, Bendigo, is an Australian cathedral. It is the Roman Catholic cathedral church of the Diocese of Sandhurst and seat of the Bishop of Sandhurst. The cathedral is located in the provincial city of Bendigo, Victoria.

The cathedral was designed in the Gothic Revival style in 1895 by an architect of the firm Reed, Barnes and Tappin. It was listed on the Victorian Heritage Register on 4 September 1997.

== Description ==
Sacred Heart Cathedral is one of Australia's largest churches and the third tallest after St Patrick's Cathedral and St Paul's Cathedral in Melbourne. It is exceptionally large for a provincial city cathedral in Australia and its construction was made possible chiefly through the estate of Henry Backhaus (1811–1882), a German from Paderborn and the first Catholic priest on the Bendigo goldfields. Backhaus was very skilled in financial matters and accumulated considerable property - not least through encouraging his goldmining parishioners to contribute some of their finds to the work of the church. Backhaus left his wealth for the benefit of the church and enabled the cathedral, among other things, to be built.

In 1895, Martin Crane, an Augustinian and the first bishop of the diocese, called for competitive designs for a cathedral from several architects. The winning architect was William Tappin of the firm Reed, Barnes and Tappin, a firm established by Joseph Reed, one of Melbourne's most significant architects. It was built in the Gothic Revival style from sandstone quarried from the Geelong area.

The large pipe organ, built by Bishop & Son of London, was installed late in 1905.

After a long interval, work recommenced on the cathedral in 1954 and was completed in 1977. The later works were designed by Bates, Smart and McCutcheon, the successor of Reed, Barnes and Tappin. The spire was of lighter construction than that originally designed, being steel framed and clad with a masonry veneer.

Sacred Heart Cathedral is 75 metres (246 ft) long and has a ceiling height of 24 metres (79 ft). The main spire is 87 metres (285 ft) high.

=== Popularity ===
The Bendigo cathedral is the destination of the annual Christus Rex Pilgrimage, which attracts Catholics with an attachment to the Tridentine Mass from across Australia. Every year since 1991, on the last weekend of October, pilgrims will walk approximately 90 km over three days, culminating with a Solemn Mass upon arriving at the cathedral.

== Photo gallery ==
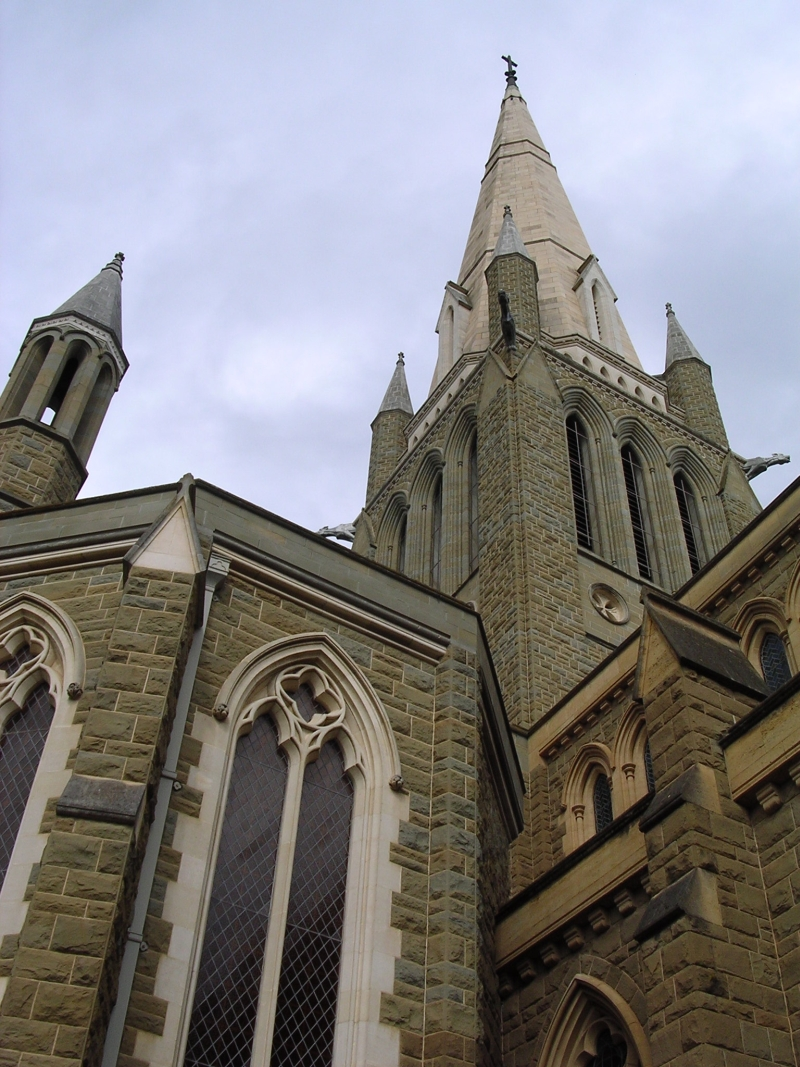
Exterior

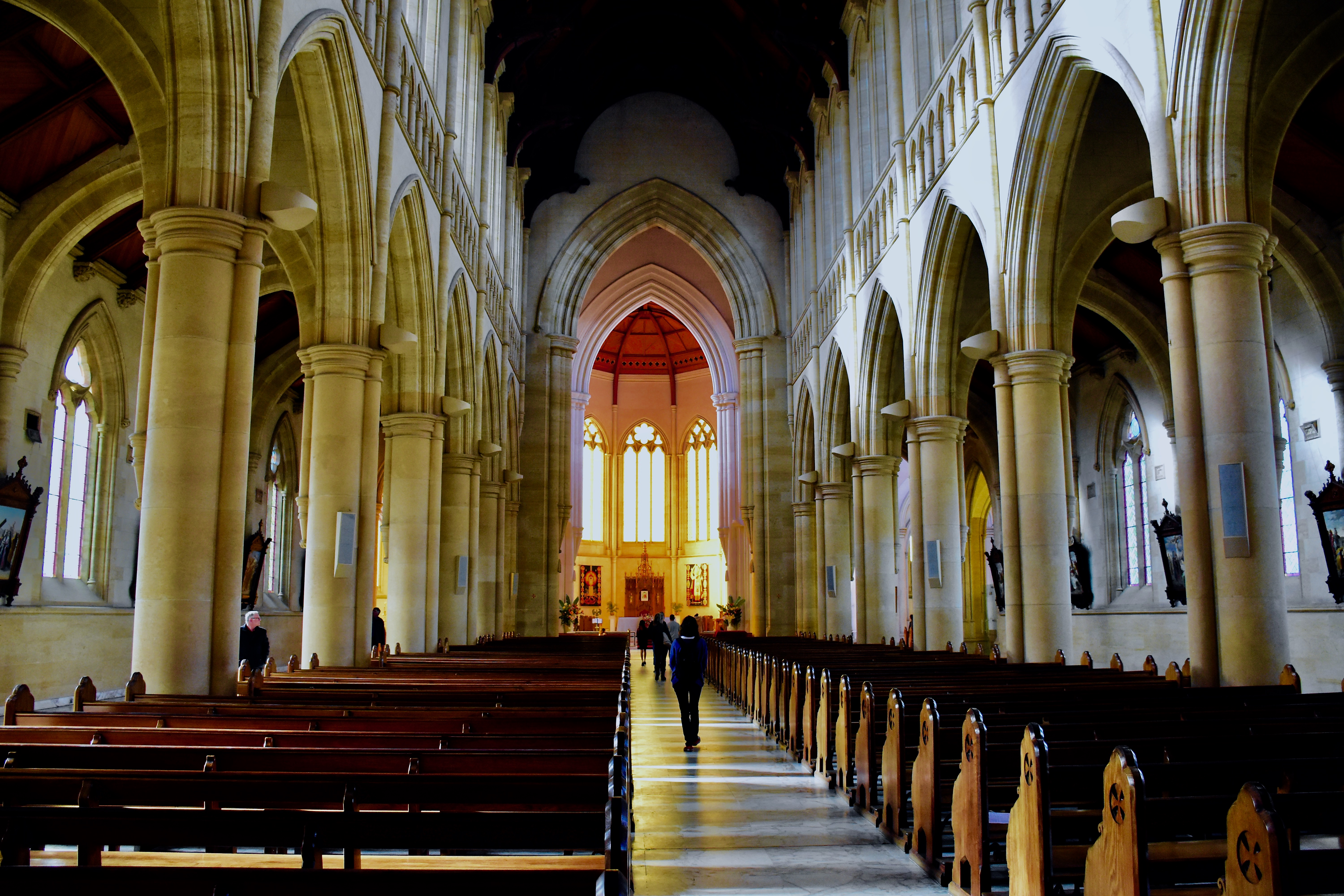
Interior

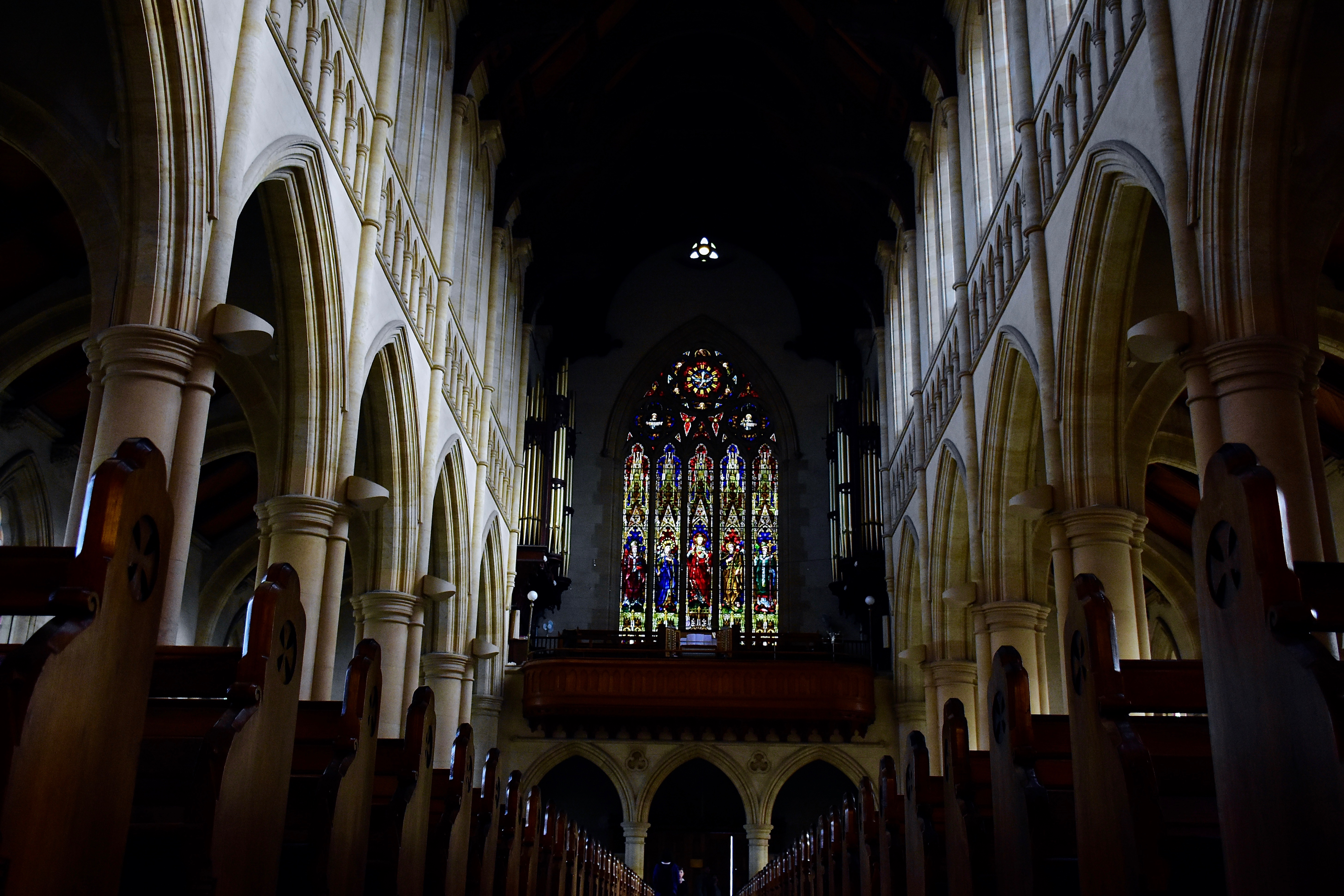
Stained glass window
