= Bernard Denis Stewart =

The Most Reverend Bernard Denis Stewart DD
- Bishop
- Diocese: Sandhurst
- Installed: 18 August 1950
- Term ended: 21 April 1979
- Predecessor: John McCarthy
- Successor: Noel Desmond Daly

Orders
- Ordination: 1929 (Priest) at Rome, Italy
- Consecration: 11 February 1947 (Bishop) at Bendigo

Personal details
- Born: 2 August 1900 Essendon, Victoria
- Died: 15 October 1988 (aged 88) Victoria, Australia
- Denomination: Roman Catholic
- Occupation: Roman Catholic bishop
- Profession: Cleric
- Education: St. Joseph's Christian Brothers' College, North Melbourne

Bernard Denis Stewart D.D., B.A., LL.B. (2 August 1900 – 15 October 1988) was the Bishop of Sandhurst, Victoria (Australia).

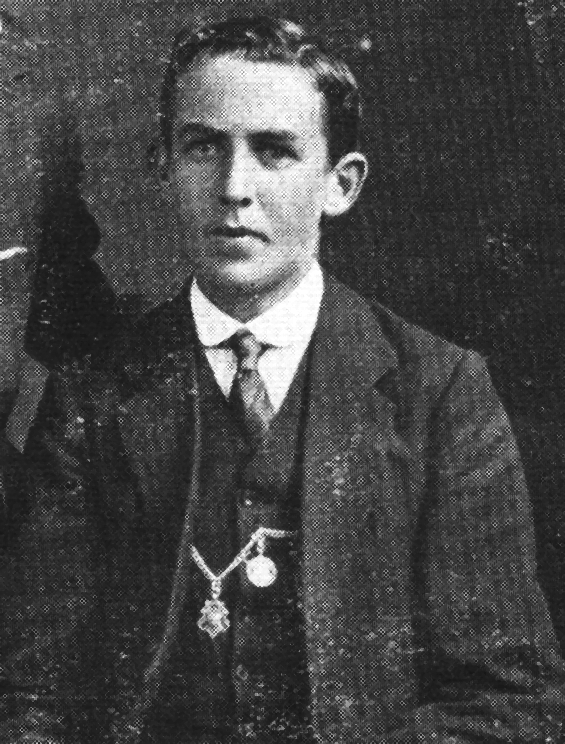
Bernard Stewart Dux of College 1916

Stewart was born at Essendon, Victoria to Ronald and Rose Stewart. He had six brothers, who were enrolled at the same school, and one sister. He attended St. Columba's Primary school, Essendon before moving to St. Joseph's Christian Brothers' College North Melbourne where he was a pupil between 1909 and 1916. Stewart was a very talented student, fair sportsman and football player. While at school he achieved Dux of College in both 1915 and 1916. He sat for and passed the Senior Public Service Exam in 1916 and entered the Federal Public Service the following year.

Studying part-time, under a Newman Scholarship, Stewart was awarded the Bachelor of Arts in 1920 and the Bachelor of Laws in 1922. Under the sponsorship of Archbishop Daniel Mannix, Stewart travelled to Rome where he began his studies for the priesthood. He was ordained in 1929 and in 1930 returned to Australia where he worked in a variety of Parishes prior to the Second World War.

Between 1939 and 1944 Stewart served as chaplain to the Citizen Military Forces (CMF) at home, predominantly in Melbourne.

Stewart was made coadjutor bishop on 11 February 1947 and Bishop of Sandhurst on 18 August 1950, a post he retained until 1979. As bishop he pursued conservative policies and there was a notable altercation with Prime Minister, Gough Whitlam. Stewart died at Bendigo in 1988.
