= Patrick Clune =

Australian cleric

The Most Reverend Patrick Clune CSsR
- 4th Roman Catholic Archbishop
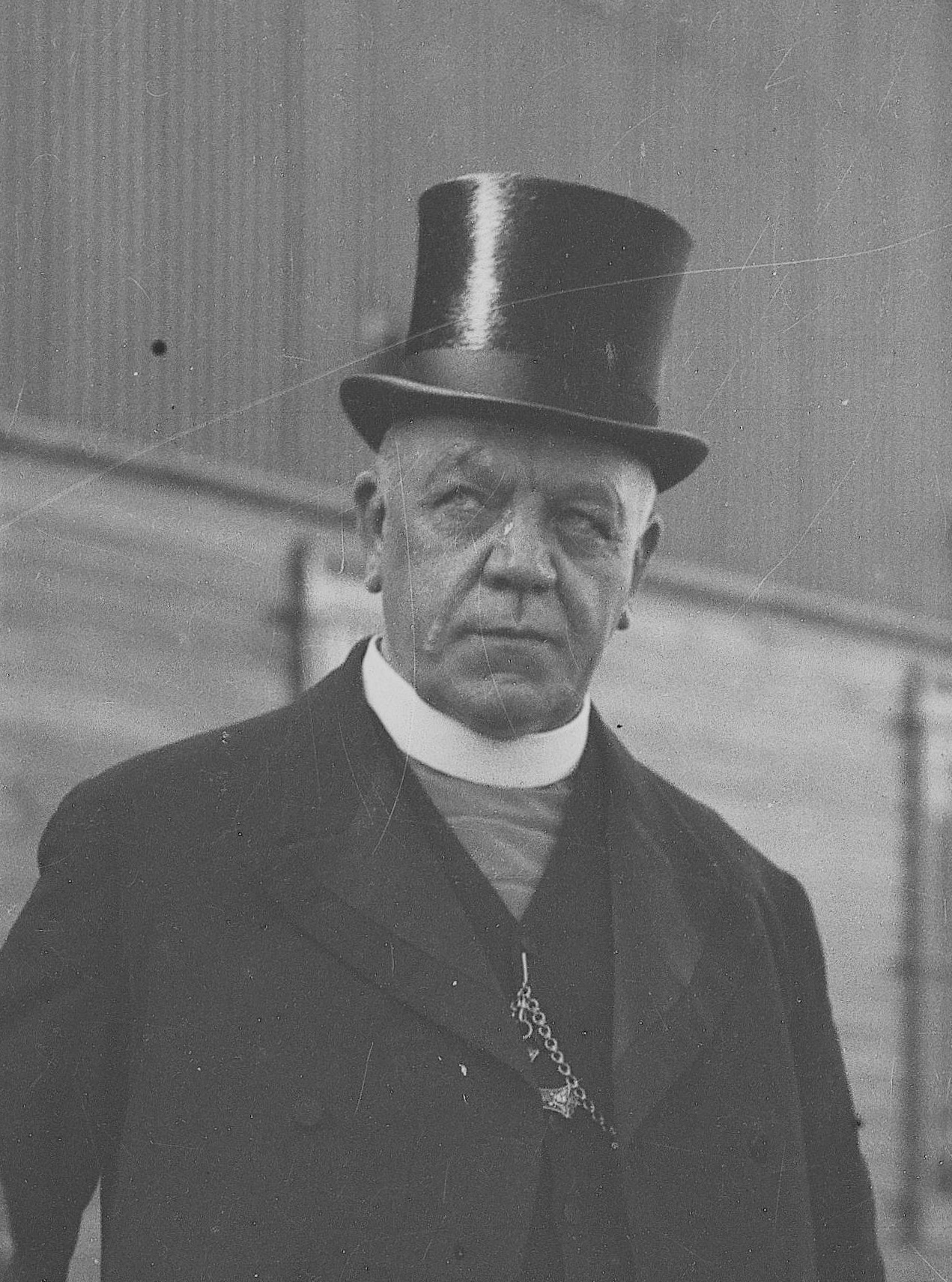
- Archbishop Clune at Fremantle wharf (1927)
- Province: Perth
- Diocese: Archdiocese of Perth
- Installed: 28 August 1913
- Term ended: 24 May 1935
- Predecessor: Matthew Gibney
- Successor: Redmond Prendiville
- Other post: Bishop of Perth (1910–1913)

Orders
- Ordination: 24 June 1886 (Priest)
- Consecration: 17 March 1911 (Bishop)

Personal details
- Born: Patrick Joseph Clune; 6 January 1864 Ruan, County Clare, Ireland
- Died: 24 May 1935 (aged 71) Perth
- Buried: Karrakatta Cemetery, Perth
- Denomination: Roman Catholic Church
- Occupation: Roman Catholic bishop
- Profession: Cleric
- Education: All Hallows College, Dublin, Ireland

Patrick Joseph Clune CSsR (6 January 1864 in Ruan, County Clare, Ireland – 24 May 1935 in Perth), an Australian metropolitan bishop, was the fourth Roman Catholic Bishop of Perth and first Archbishop of Perth. Clune served continuously in these roles from 1910 to 1935.

== Early life and priestly ministry ==
Clune was educated in Ruan and at St Flannan's College in Ennis. In 1879 he entered the Catholic Missionary All Hallows College in Dublin to study for the priesthood, sponsored for the Diocese of Goldburn, Australia.

He was ordained in 1886, aged 22. His first appointment was to St Patrick's College, Goulburn in New South Wales.

He professed vows as a member of the Congregation of the Most Holy Redeemer (Redemptorists) on 13 September 1894, and spent four years in missions in England and Ireland until 1898, before spending a short time as superior of the Redemptorist monastery in Wellington, New Zealand. In 1899 he was assigned to Western Australia.

== Bishop/Archbishop of Perth ==
In 1911 he was nominated Bishop of Perth and received episcopal ordination from Cardinal Patrick Moran on 17 March 1911.

Two years later in 1913, the diocese was elevated to an archdiocese and thus Clune became Archbishop. He supported Australia's involvement with the British Empire during the Great War, and along with the other Australian Bishops, with the exception of Archbishop Daniel Mannix, supported the introduction of conscription.

He played a significant role in the split of Christian Brothers College, Perth to form Aquinas College in the 1930s. Between 1921 and 1931, Clune opened 56 new churches, schools and convents throughout his diocese, in 1930 St. Mary's Cathedral, Perth was redeveloped.

=== Mediator between Lloyd George and Irish Nationalists 1920 ===
Prior to December 1920, Archbishop acted as an intermediary between David Lloyd George and the Irish leaders during the Irish War of Independence. Clune with his strong support for the Great War and conscription in Australia, would have been seen as pro-British, had met with and gained the trust of Lloyd George, returned to Dublin incognito as "Doctor Walsh", he met with Arthur Griffith (acting president of the republic and Sinn Féin while De Valera was in America) in Mountjoy Jail and then Michael Collins who was voted by the Dail to act as president while Griffith was in prison.

Clune's meeting with the Irish republican leadership was arranged by Bishop Fogarty of Killaloe, Bishop in Clune's native County Clare, who had served as vice-president on Maynooth to the then president and future Archbishop of Melbourne, Daniel Mannix who was known for his nationalist strong sympathies. Mannix was an opponent of Clune among the Australian bishops during the Great War conscription debate.

== Death and reburial ==
He died on 24 May 1935 and was buried in Karrakatta Cemetery. His remains were exhumed in June 2013, and reinterred in the crypt of St Mary's Cathedral Perth in September 2013. He was succeeded by another Irish-born prelate, Archbishop Redmond Prendiville.

== See also ==
- Catholic bishops and archbishops of Perth, Western Australia

Catholic Church titles
Preceded by Matthew Gibney	4th Catholic Bishop of Perth; 1910–1913	Succeeded by n/a
Preceded by n/a	1st Catholic Archbishop of Perth; 1913–1935	Succeeded by Redmond Prendiville
