= Thomas Furlong (bishop) =

- Bishop of Ferns
- Church: Catholic Church
- Diocese: Diocese of Ferns
- In office: 9 January 1857 – 12 November 1875
- Predecessor: Myles Murphy
- Successor: Michael Warren

Orders
- Ordination: 20 May 1826
- Consecration: 22 March 1857 by Paul Cullen

Personal details
- Born: 4 February 1803 Mayglass (west of Ballycogley), County Wexford, United Kingdom of Great Britain and Ireland
- Died: 12 November 1875 (aged 72) Wexford, County Wexford, United Kingdom of Great Britain and Ireland

Thomas Furlong (b Mayglass, County Wexford 4 February 1803; d Wexford 12 November 1875) was an Irish Roman Catholic clergyman who served as the Bishop of Ferns from 1857 until his death.

Furlong was educated at St Peter's College, Wexford and St Patrick's Pontifical University, Maynooth. He was on the staff at Maynooth from 1827 until 1857. He was ordained Bishop of Ferns on 22 March 1857, and died in post.
