= Giuseppe Palica =

Catholic archbishop

- Viceregent of Rome
- Church: Catholic Church
- Diocese: Diocese of Rome
- In office: 25 April 1917 – 16 December 1936
- Predecessor: Giuseppe Ceppetelli
- Successor: Luigi Traglia
- Other post: Titular Archbishop of Philippi (1917-1936)

Orders
- Ordination: 18 December 1892
- Consecration: 20 May 1917 by Basilio Pompili

Personal details
- Born: 8 October 1869 Rome, Papal States
- Died: 16 December 1936 (aged 67) Rome, Kingdom of Italy

Giuseppe Palica (8 October 1869 – 16 December 1936) was an Italian Archbishop.

Born in Rome, he was ordained priest on 18 December 1892.

On 25 April 1917, he was appointed vice-gerent of Rome and titular archbishop of Philippi.

On 20 May 1917, he was ordained bishop by Cardinal Basilio Pompili, vicar general of Rome and its district.

He was present at the signing of the Reichskonkordat between the Holy See and the Nazi government of Germany on 20 July 1933.

He died in Rome, aged 67.
