= Eure-et-Loir's 1st constituency =

Constituency of the National Assembly of France

1st constituency of Eure-et-Loir
- inline Constituency of the National Assembly of France

- constituency in department

- Eure-et-Loir in France
- Deputy: Guillaume Kasbarian; RE
- Department: Eure-et-Loir
- Cantons: Chartres Nord-Est, Chartres Sud-Est, Chartres Sud-Ouest, Maintenon, Nogent-le-Roi

The 1st constituency of Eure-et-Loir is a French legislative constituency in the Eure-et-Loir département.

It is based in the city of Chartres.

== Assembly Members ==
Election	Member	Party
1988	Georges Lemoine	PS
1993	Gérard Cornu	RPR
1997	Georges Lemoine	PS
2002	Jean-Pierre Gorges	UMP
2007	Jean-Pierre Gorges	UMP
2008	Françoise Vallet	PS
2008	Jean-Pierre Gorges	UMP
2012	Jean-Pierre Gorges	UMP
2017	Guillaume Kasbarian	LREM
2022	Guillaume Kasbarian	RE
2024	Véronique de Montchalin	RE
2024	Guillaume Kasbarian	RE
2024	Isabelle Mesnard	RE
2025	Guillaume Kasbarian	RE

== Election results ==
=== 2024 ===
Candidate	Party	Alliance	First round			Second round		
Candidate	Party	Alliance	Votes	%	+/–	Votes	%	+/–
Emma Minot	RN		20,576	33.66	+14.94	23,315	39.41	new
Guillaume Kasbarian	RE	Ensemble	20,105	32.89	+1.57	35,842	60.59	+2.49
Jean-François Bridet	LE	NFP	14,705	24.05	+1.22	withdrew		
Ladislas Vergne	LR	UDC	4,388	7.18	-1.63			
Pierre-Louis Delauney	REC		698	1.14	-3.57			
Marie-José Aubert	LO		659	1.08	-0.18			
Votes			61,131	100.00		59,157	100.00	
Valid votes			61,131	97.78	-0.42	59,157	95.09	+3.55
Blank votes			1,035	1.66	+0.41	2,358	3.79	-2.41
Null votes			350	0.56	+0.01	696	1.12	-1.14
Turnout			62,516	68.27	+18.95	62,211	67.93	+21.49
Abstentions			29,049	31.73	-18.95	29,376	32.07	-21.49
Registered voters			91,565			91,587		
Result			RE HOLD					

=== 2022 ===
Legislative Election 2022: Eure-et-Loir's 1st constituency
Party	Candidate	Votes	%	±%
LREM (Ensemble)	Guillaume Kasbarian	10,087	31.32	-5.80
EELV (NUPÉS)	Quentin Guillemain	8,370	22.83	+3.96
RN	David Delorme-Monsarrat	8,270	18.72	+5.98
LR (UDC)	Ladislas Vergne	3,892	8.81	−13.34
LR	Karine Dorange*	3,706	8.39	N/A
REC	Cyril Hemardinquer	2,083	4.71	N/A
PA	Pierre Mazaheri	1,040	2.35	+0.57
LP (UPF)	Lucien Maillet	707	1.60	−0.29
LO	Marie-José Aubert	557	1.26	+0.47
Turnout		44,180	49.32	−1.82
2nd round result
LREM (Ensemble)	Guillaume Kasbarian	22,530	58.10	+2.92
EELV (NUPÉS)	Quentin Guillemain	16,251	41.90	N/A
Turnout		38,781	46.44	+2.98
LREM hold				

* LR dissident, not supported by UDC alliance.

=== 2017 ===
Candidate	Label	First round		Second round	
Candidate	Label	Votes	%	Votes	%
Guillaume Kasbarian	REM	16,577	37.12	19,127	55.18
Franck Masselus	LR	9,892	22.15	15,534	44.82
Sylvie Rouxel	FN	5,688	12.74		
Julien Morainnes	FI	4,608	10.32		
Stéphane Cordier	PS	2,921	6.54		
Michel Teilleux	DVD	1,258	2.82		
Hugues Villemade	PCF	896	2.01		
Régine Lemoine	DLF	843	1.89		
Pierre Mazaheri	ECO	794	1.78		
Marie-José Aubert	EXG	352	0.79		
Clément Dumons	DIV	336	0.75		
Stéphanie Gaidou	EXD	263	0.59		
Noé Common	DIV	145	0.32		
Thibaut Brière-Saunier	DVD	83	0.19		
Valérie Caillol	DVD	0	0.00		
Votes		44,656	100.00	34,661	100.00
Valid votes		44,656	97.96	34,661	89.49
Blank votes		673	1.48	3,096	7.99
Null votes		255	0.56	976	2.52
Turnout		45,584	51.14	38,733	43.46
Abstentions		43,558	48.86	50,398	56.54
Registered voters		89,142		89,131	
Source: Ministry of the Interior

=== 2012 ===
2012 legislative election in Eure-Et-Loir's 1st constituency
Candidate	Party	First round		Second round	
Candidate	Party	Votes	%	Votes	%
Jean-Pierre Gorges	UMP	19,562	38.61%	25,830	50.80%
David Lebon	PS	19,444	38.38%	25,032	49.23%
Nathalie Grenier	FN	7,283	14.37%		
Ingrid Lescarbotte	FG	2,128	4.20%		
Antoine Chassaing	AEI	730	1.44%		
Adrien Chevalier	DVD (UPF)	582	1.15%		
Adeline El-Idrissi	DLR	428	0.84%		
Marie-José Aubert	LO	287	0.57%		
Mélinée Treppoz	NPA	183	0.36%		
Thibaut Briere-Saunier	AR	39	0.08%		
Valid votes		50,666	98.50%	50,842	97.15%
Spoilt and null votes		770	1.50%	1,490	2.85%
Votes cast / turnout		51,436	58.92%	52,332	59.94%
Abstentions		35,865	41.08%	34,971	40.06%
Registered voters		87,301	100.00%	87,303	100.00%

=== September 2008 ===
Eure-et-Loir 1st by-election - 2nd round
Party	Candidate	Votes	%	±%
UMP	Jean-Pierre Gorges	13,885	50.94	
PS	David Lebon	13,370	49.06	
Turnout		27,255	33.11	
UMP gain from PS		Swing		

=== January–February 2008 ===
Eure-et-Loir 1st by-election - 2nd round
Party	Candidate	Votes	%	±%
PS	Françoise Vallet	20,946	55.26	
UMP	Jean-Pierre Gorges	16,958	44.74	
Turnout		37,904	45.85	
PS gain from UMP		Swing		

=== 2007 ===
Legislative Election 2007: Eure-et-Loir's 1st constituency
Party	Candidate	Votes	%	±%
UMP	Jean-Pierre Gorges	20,596	40.73	+9.92
PS	Françoise Vallet	12,632	24.98	−4.58
MoDem	Eric Chevee	9,193	18.18	N/A
FN	Gabrielle Delvallee	2,657	5.25	−6.99
LV	Claude Epineau	1,885	3.73	−0.12
LCR	Mathieu Dameron	1,251	2.47	+1.19
PCF	Lionel Geollot	989	1.96	±0.00
CPNT	Kathy Garreyn	775	1.53	−0.58
LO	Marie-José Aubert	592	1.17	−0.21
Turnout		51,487	60.35	−4.76
2nd round result
UMP	Jean-Pierre Gorges	23,556	50.06	−4.25
PS	Françoise Vallet	23,497	49.94	+4.25
Turnout		49,200	57.67	−3.59
UMP hold				

=== 2002 ===
Legislative Election 2002: Eure-et-Loir's 1st constituency
Party	Candidate	Votes	%	±%
UMP	Jean-Pierre Gorges	15,546	30.81	+0.17
PS	Georges Lemoine	14,918	29.56	−1.90
UDF	Eric Chevee	7,413	14.69	N/A
FN	Jacqueline Peslerbe	6,175	12.24	−4.16
LV	Mauricette Girard	1,944	3.85	−0.51
CPNT	Daniel Tonnellier	1,063	2.11	N/A
Others	N/A	3,400	-	−
Turnout		51,405	65.11	−3.63
2nd round result
UMP	Jean-Pierre Gorges	25,196	54.31	+5.13
PS	Georges Lemoine	21,201	45.69	−5.13
Turnout		48,363	61.26	−11.49
UMP gain from PS				

=== 1997 ===
Legislative Election 1997: Eure-et-Loir's 1st constituency
Party	Candidate	Votes	%	±%
PS	Georges Lemoine	15,330	31.46	
RPR	Gérard Cornu	14,932	30.64	
FN	Thierry Le Nagat	7,990	16.40	
PCF	Dominique Padois	2,649	5.44	
LV	Claude Epineau	2,125	4.36	
LDI	Jacques Leveillard	1,896	3.89	
LO	Anne Godde	1,872	3.84	
GE	Muriel Milkevitch	1,624	3.33	
DIV	Xavier Hatton	312	0.64	
Turnout		50,917	68.74	
2nd round result
PS	Georges Lemoine	25,844	50.82	
RPR	Gérard Cornu	25,007	49.18	
Turnout		53,884	72.75	
PS gain from RPR				

== Sources ==
- Official results of French elections from 1998: "Résultats électoraux officiels en France" (in French). Archived from the original on 20 December 2011.
