= Isabelle Mesnard =

French politician (born 1967)

Member of the National Assembly of France for Eure-et-Loir's 1st constituency
- In office 22 October 2024 – 23 January 2025
- Preceded by: Guillaume Kasbarian
- Succeeded by: Guillaume Kasbarian

Personal details
- Born: 30 October 1967 (age 58) Saint-Quentin, Aisne, France
- Party: RE

Isabelle Mesnard (born 30 October 1967) is a French politician. She was the substitute for the deputy of Eure-et-Loir's 1st constituency Guillaume Kasbarian when he was appointed minister of the civil service in the Michel Barnier government on 21 September 2024. She replaced him in the National Assembly on 22 October 2024 until 23 January 2025.

== Biography ==
Isabelle Mesnard has been a municipal councillor in Chartres since 2001. In 2014, she was deputy mayor in charge of entertainment.

She is the deputy vice-president of the Chartres Métropole urban community responsible for the Promotion of Tourism, Strategy and monitoring of actions related to tourism.

In 2023, she became municipal delegate of Chartres for Horizons.

Following the appointment of Guillaume Kasbarian to the Barnier government, she became a deputy for the Eure-et-Loir's 1st constituency and sat on the Foreign Affairs Committee, until 23 January 2025 and the return of Guillaume Kasbarian to the National Assembly.

She is the president of Véloscénie and of the Société publique locale (SPL), C'Chartres Tourisme, until 2024.

Since 23 January 2025 she is again 9th vice-president of the métropole de Chartres.

== See also ==
- List of deputies of the 17th National Assembly of France
