= Pierre-Ladislas Vergne =

Mayor of Chartres since 2026

Mayor of Chartres
- Incumbent
- Assumed office 28 March 2026
- Deputy: Guillaume Kasbarian
- Preceded by: Jean-Pierre Gorges

Personal details
- Born: Ladislas Vergne; 24 December 1991 (age 34) Paris, France
- Citizenship: France
- Party: Miscellaneous right

Ladislas Vergne (born 24 December 1991 in Paris) is a French senior civil servant and politician. He was elected mayor of Chartres in March 2026.

== Biography ==
Born in Paris, he grew up in Chartres and completed part of his education in Vienna. He graduated from the Institut d'études politiques de Paris (Sciences Po) and is a former student of the École nationale d'administration (ENA), class of Georges Orwell (2015–2016).

After returning to Eure-et-Loir, he became involved in local community life before beginning a career in the senior civil service. On 30 January 2017, he was appointed inspector of administration (second class) at the General Inspectorate of Administration.

In 2019, he joined the National Agency for Territorial Cohesion as a project manager for the "France Services" programme, before becoming Director of Strategy and Training in 2021.

== Early political career ==
Following the 2020 municipal elections, he became deputy mayor of Chartres, in charge of social affairs, youth, and memory. In 2021, citing shortcomings in the management of city affairs, Mayor Jean-Pierre Gorges removed his delegations.

Inspired by Jean-Pierre Chevènement and Philippe Séguin, Vergne considers Olivier Marleix his political mentor. He worked with him in Parliament as secretary-general of the Les Républicains group at the National Assembly from 2022 to 2024.

He ran as a candidate for Les Républicains in the 2022 and 2024 legislative elections but did not reach 10% of the vote. In 2024, he attracted media attention by performing a parachute jump to criticize the "parachuting" of a National Rally candidate in the constituency.

He later distanced himself from Les Républicains and began a door-to-door campaign in preparation for the 2026 municipal elections.

== Mayor of Chartres ==
After four consecutive terms held by Jean-Pierre Gorges, Vergne was elected mayor of Chartres at the age of 34 with 50.84% of the vote. Several media outlets highlighted the symbolic significance of this result against a mayor who had been in office for 25 years. France 3 described it as a "slap", while Le Parisien referred to Gorges being "knocked off his pedestal".

His list won 30 out of 39 seats on the municipal council, securing an absolute majority.

On 28 March 2026, the first municipal council meeting of the term formally confirmed his election as mayor and set the number of deputy mayors at eleven and delegated councillors at eight.
