= De Montchalin =

de Montchalin is a French surname.

Notable people with the surname include:

- Amélie de Montchalin (born 1985), French politician
- Véronique de Montchalin (born 1948), French politician

== See also ==
- Montchanin, French commune
