= Christus Rex Pilgrimage =

Christian pilgrimage in Victoria, Australia

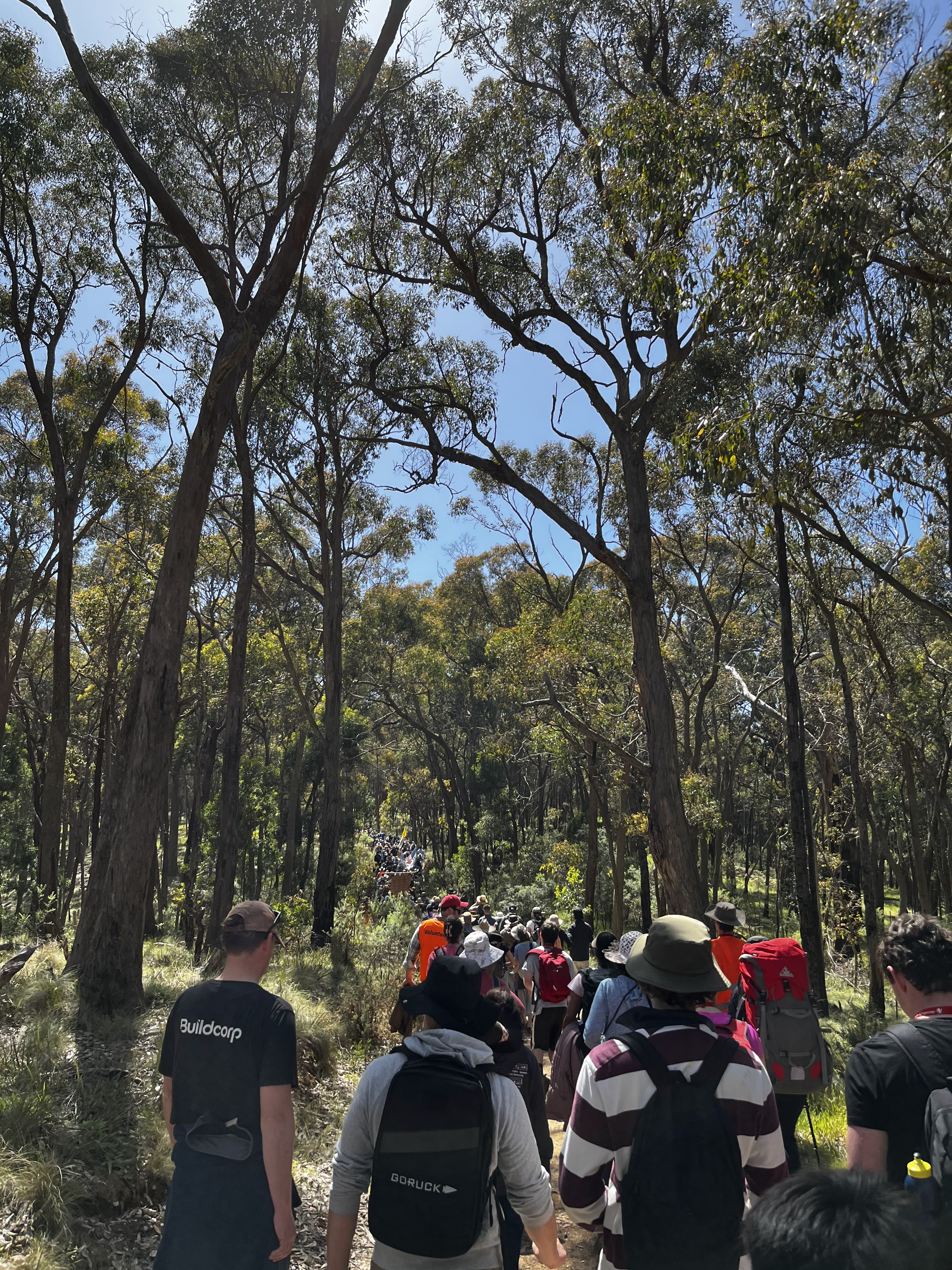
Pilgrims walking through forest trails in regional Victoria during the 2023 pilgrimage

The Christus Rex Pilgrimage (Latin for "Christ the King") is an annual traditional Catholic walking pilgrimage held in the state of Victoria, Australia. Spanning approximately 90 kilometres over three days, the pilgrimage commences at St Patrick's Cathedral in Ballarat and concludes at Sacred Heart Cathedral in Bendigo. It is organised by the Christus Rex Society Inc., a lay Catholic volunteer organisation, and takes place on the last weekend of October to coincide with the Feast of Christ the King as observed in the 1962 Roman Missal calendar.

== Background ==
Historically, Christian pilgrimage was conceived as a demanding physical journey to a sacred site, typically undertaken on foot or horseback. The physical hardships encountered—such as inclement weather, exhaustion, and discomfort—were understood not merely as obstacles but as spiritually edifying experiences that mirrored the trials of earthly life. In this context, the pilgrimage served as an allegory for the Christian’s journey toward heaven, with the holy destination representing the eternal joy of union with God. This theological and symbolic dimension of pilgrimage continues to inspire contemporary Christians, many of whom still undertake traditional walking routes such as the Way of St James (Camino de Santiago), seeking both spiritual renewal and historical continuity with medieval devotional practices.

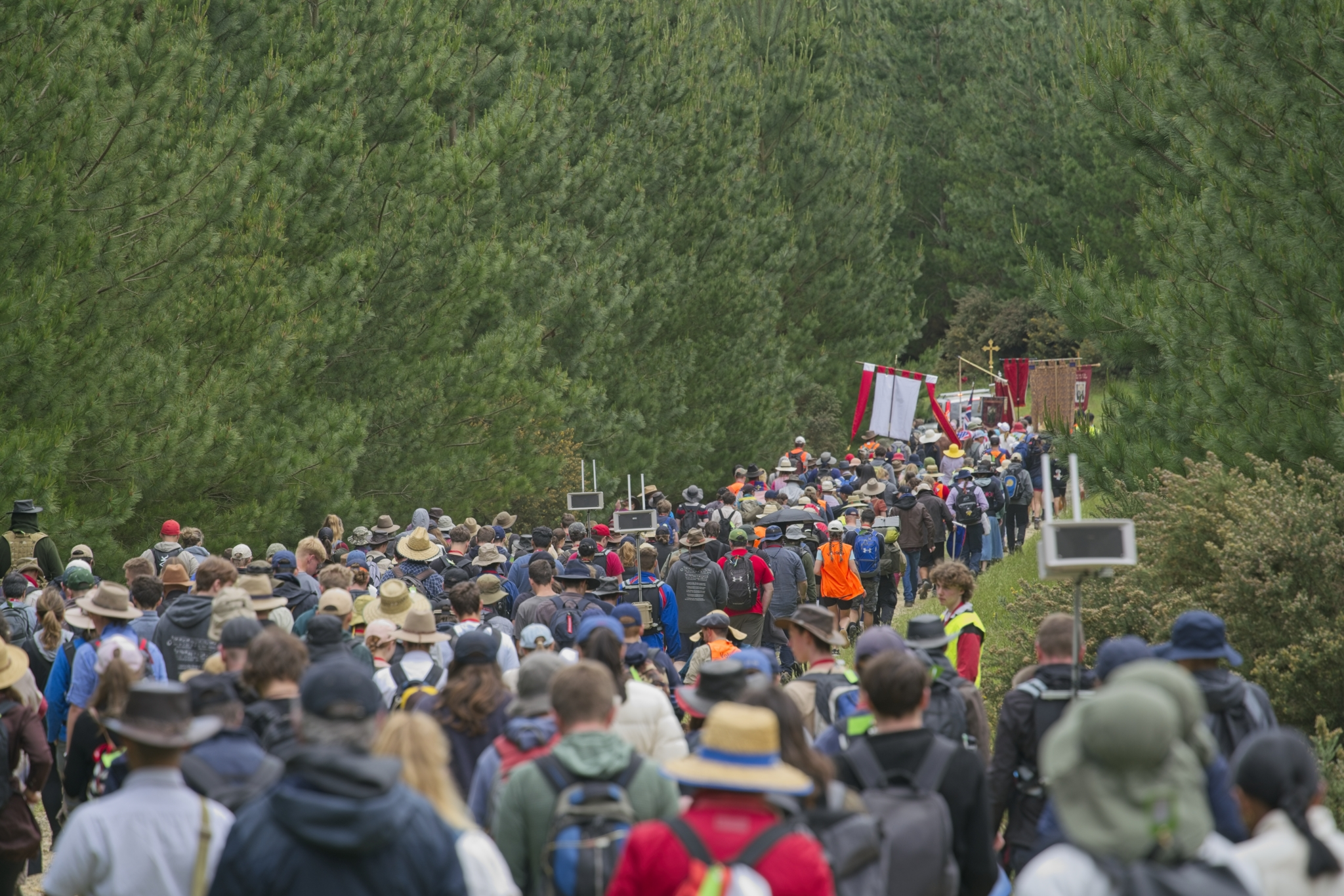
Pilgrims walk through the state forest in 2024

== History ==
The Christus Rex Pilgrimage was founded in 1991 by a group of Australian lay Catholics devoted to the traditional liturgy of the Church. It was directly inspired by the Chartres Pilgrimage in France—an annual Pentecost weekend event that revived medieval pilgrimage practices in the early 1980s. The French pilgrimage had begun with a small number of Catholics seeking to restore public devotion, penance, and reverence through the Traditional Latin Mass. Within two decades, the Chartres Pilgrimage had grown to attract thousands of participants, including many from abroad, who walked in prayer from Notre-Dame de Paris to Notre-Dame de Chartres.

Inspired by this revival, the Australian founders sought to establish a similar tradition locally. Their aim was to create a three-day walking pilgrimage that would offer public witness to the kingship of Christ while fostering spiritual renewal through the traditional Roman liturgy. They identified a route from St Patrick’s Cathedral] in Ballarat to Sacred Heart Cathedral in Bendigo, selecting it for its suitable distance, its accessible yet rural character, and the architectural dignity of the cathedrals at both ends. The Feast of Christ the King, observed on the final Sunday of October in the 1962 Roman calendar, was chosen as the liturgical anchor for the event, providing both thematic resonance and favourable weather conditions.

The first Christus Rex Pilgrimage was held in 1991, with approximately a dozen participants from various Australian states. They were accompanied by Fr John Parsons of Canberra, who served as chaplain. Though modest in scale and lacking many of the logistical supports available today—there were no walking marshals or portable amenities—the early pilgrims established enduring traditions: the Rosary was prayed in procession, hymns were sung, short spiritual talks (ferverinos) were given along the route, and Masses were offered in the Traditional Roman Rite. In these early years, Saturday night accommodation was in the historic town of Maldon, where the Sunday morning Mass of Christ the King was celebrated before pilgrims completed the final leg to Bendigo. Second Vespers was sung later that afternoon in the cathedral. Memorable features of the early pilgrimages included the generous hospitality of volunteers who prepared traditional roast dinners on Saturday evenings—an event fondly remembered by long-time participants.

Over the following decades, the pilgrimage experienced steady growth. It now draws several hundred participants annually, including clergy, religious, families, university students and pilgrims from overseas. Each day of the pilgrimage includes the celebration of Solemn High Mass according to the 1962 Roman Missal, and while the event is particularly popular among those attached to the Traditional Latin Mass, it remains open to all, including non-Catholics and those unfamiliar with the traditional liturgy.

The Christus Rex Pilgrimage has received pastoral support from several bishops in Australia and New Zealand. In various years, bishops Peter Elliott, Basil Meeking, Columba Macbeth-Green and Richard Umbers have celebrated the concluding Mass in Bendigo, often as a Pontifical High Mass.

During the COVID-19 pandemic, when large gatherings were restricted in Victoria, the pilgrimage was adapted in creative and symbolic ways. In 2020, a single pilgrim walked the full 90-kilometre route alone, carrying with him the written intentions of past pilgrims who were unable to attend. In 2021, an online program was developed to engage the wider pilgrimage community virtually. This included video messages and spiritual reflections prepared by priests from across Australia and New Zealand, enabling participants to spiritually unite with the pilgrimage from their homes. These efforts reflected the organisers’ dedication to maintaining the spiritual heart of the event, even under extraordinary circumstances.

The pilgrimage resumed in its traditional format in 2022, marking its 30th anniversary, and continues to be held annually. Registrations typically open following the Feast of Pentecost each year.

== Organisation ==
The Christus Rex Pilgrimage is organised by the Christus Rex Society Inc., a non-profit incorporated association based in Victoria, Australia. The society was established for the express purpose of facilitating the annual pilgrimage and promoting devotion to Christ the King through the Traditional Latin liturgy. The organisation is entirely volunteer-run, with no paid staff or permanent office. The society operates year-round, with volunteers coordinating logistics, communications, liturgical preparation, accommodation, catering, safety, transport and first aid. Event planning involves detailed negotiations with local councils, landowners, churches and community groups to ensure safe and lawful access to roads, halls and camping grounds along the pilgrimage route. Key support roles during the pilgrimage include walking marshals, first aid providers, safety car drivers, sacristans, servers, choir directors, children's activities coordinators and logistics managers.

The society does not receive government or corporate sponsorship. All expenses related to the pilgrimage are funded through pilgrim registration fees, private donations and the sale of merchandise. Financial decisions are made conservatively, with the priority of maintaining accessibility for pilgrims while ensuring the safe and reverent conduct of the event.

The society's structure reflects its foundational ethos: to operate as a work of charity and service in the Catholic tradition, enabling a spiritually fruitful pilgrimage without commercialisation or institutional dependence. The pilgrimages continuity and growth over more than three decades is a testament to the dedication of its volunteer base, whose contributions range from administrative coordination to physical labour during the event itself.

== Spiritual aspects ==
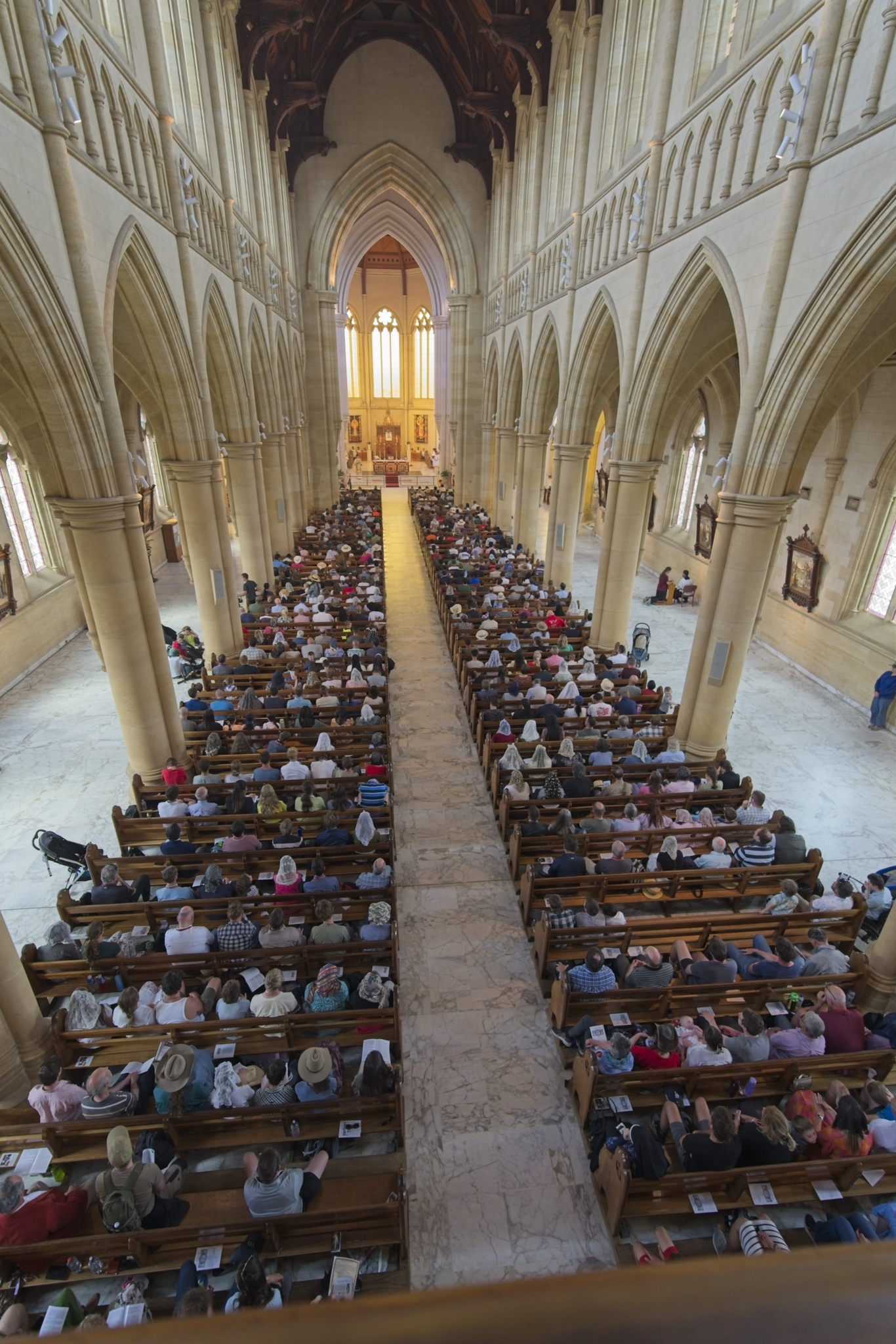
Pilgrims fill Sacred Heart Cathedral in 2024

The Christus Rex Pilgrimage is intended as a public act of Catholic witness, centred on the proclamation of the universal kingship of Christ. Drawing its inspiration from Quas primas—the 1925 encyclical of Pope Pius XI that instituted the Feast of Christ the King—the pilgrimage seeks to affirm Christ's sovereignty not only over individual hearts, but also over families, societies and nations. In Quas primas, Pius XI writes that the faithful must "restore all things in Christ" (Instaurare omnia in Christo) and affirms that "as long as individuals and states refuse to submit to the rule of our Saviour, there can be no hopeful prospect of lasting peace among nations" (QP, §1, §8). The Christus Rex Pilgrimage therefore functions not only as a personal devotion but as a communal declaration of Catholic identity and mission in the public square.

At its heart, the pilgrimage is a penitential and spiritual journey. Participants walk approximately 90 kilometres over three days, engaging in continuous communal prayer, the singing of hymns, the rosary, spiritual reflections (ferverinos), and personal silence. Each day begins or concludes with the celebration of Mass in the Extraordinary Form, offered according to the 1962 Roman Missal. These liturgies are solemn and reverent, featuring Gregorian chant and traditional sacred polyphony. Priests are available throughout the route to hear confessions, and eucharistic adoration is frequently offered at rest points or overnight locations.

A distinctive feature of the pilgrimage is the Children’s Chapter, which allows young pilgrims (generally aged 5–12) to engage more deeply with the spiritual purpose of the journey. The Children’s Chapter provides age-appropriate catechesis, storytelling, craft and recreational activities, enabling families to participate more fully. While younger children may be carried in support vehicles for portions of the walk, the program fosters a spirit of inclusion and formation for Catholic families.

Ultimately, the Christus Rex Pilgrimage seeks to unite physical endurance with spiritual discipline, in the tradition of Christian pilgrimage as an allegory for the journey of the soul toward God. It invites participants to offer their sacrifices in reparation for sin, for the conversion of souls and the public glorification of Christ the King.

== Itinerary and route ==
The Christus Rex Pilgrimage follows a structured three-day itinerary, covering approximately 90 kilometres through regional Victoria. The pilgrimage begins at St Patrick's Cathedral in Ballarat and concludes at Sacred Heart Cathedral in Bendigo, traversing farmland, historical towns, forest trails and country roads along the way. The route was carefully selected for both its physical suitability—being a manageable three-day walk—and its symbolic value, linking two prominent Catholic cathedrals in the Victorian goldfields.

=== Thursday – arrival and preparation ===
Pilgrims arrive in Ballarat on the Thursday evening before the pilgrimage begins. Registration and check-in take place at St Patrick's Cathedral, with separate overnight accommodation arranged for men, women and families in historic venues throughout the city. A welcome Mass or spiritual reflection is typically offered that evening, setting the tone for the days ahead.

=== Friday – Ballarat to Smeaton ===
The pilgrimage formally begins early Friday morning with a Votive Mass of the Holy Cross celebrated at St Patrick’s Cathedral. Pilgrims then depart in procession, beginning the first walking stage through the city and into the countryside. The day concludes with an overnight stop in the township of Smeaton, where pilgrims may camp or stay in the community hall. Evening devotions and confessions are offered on site.

=== Saturday – Smeaton to Newstead (via Campbelltown) ===
Saturday’s route continues through rural farmland and small historic villages, including a midday stop in Campbelltown, where a Votive Mass of the Blessed Virgin Mary is offered in a temporary open-air chapel. The pilgrimage then proceeds to the overnight site in Newstead, where pilgrims again have access to camping grounds or communal sleeping facilities. Saturday evening typically features further devotions, talks, or sung Compline.

=== Sunday – Newstead to Bendigo ===
The final day begins before dawn as pilgrims depart Newstead, travelling through undulating terrain and state forest before arriving at the outskirts of Bendigo. After regrouping at the Rotary Gateway Park in Kangaroo Flat, pilgrims enter the city in procession, singing hymns and praying the rosary as they approach Sacred Heart Cathedral. Upon arrival, a public act of homage is made on the cathedral steps, followed by the Solemn Mass of Christ the King celebrated in the Traditional Latin Rite, often by a bishop. The pilgrimage concludes with this liturgical climax, which is open to both pilgrims and the wider public.

=== Post-pilgrimage events ===
Following Mass, pilgrims are invited to a celebratory dinner at a local venue in Bendigo. On Monday morning, a farewell breakfast is held for those who remain overnight. These informal gatherings foster community and offer pilgrims an opportunity to reflect on their spiritual journey before returning home.

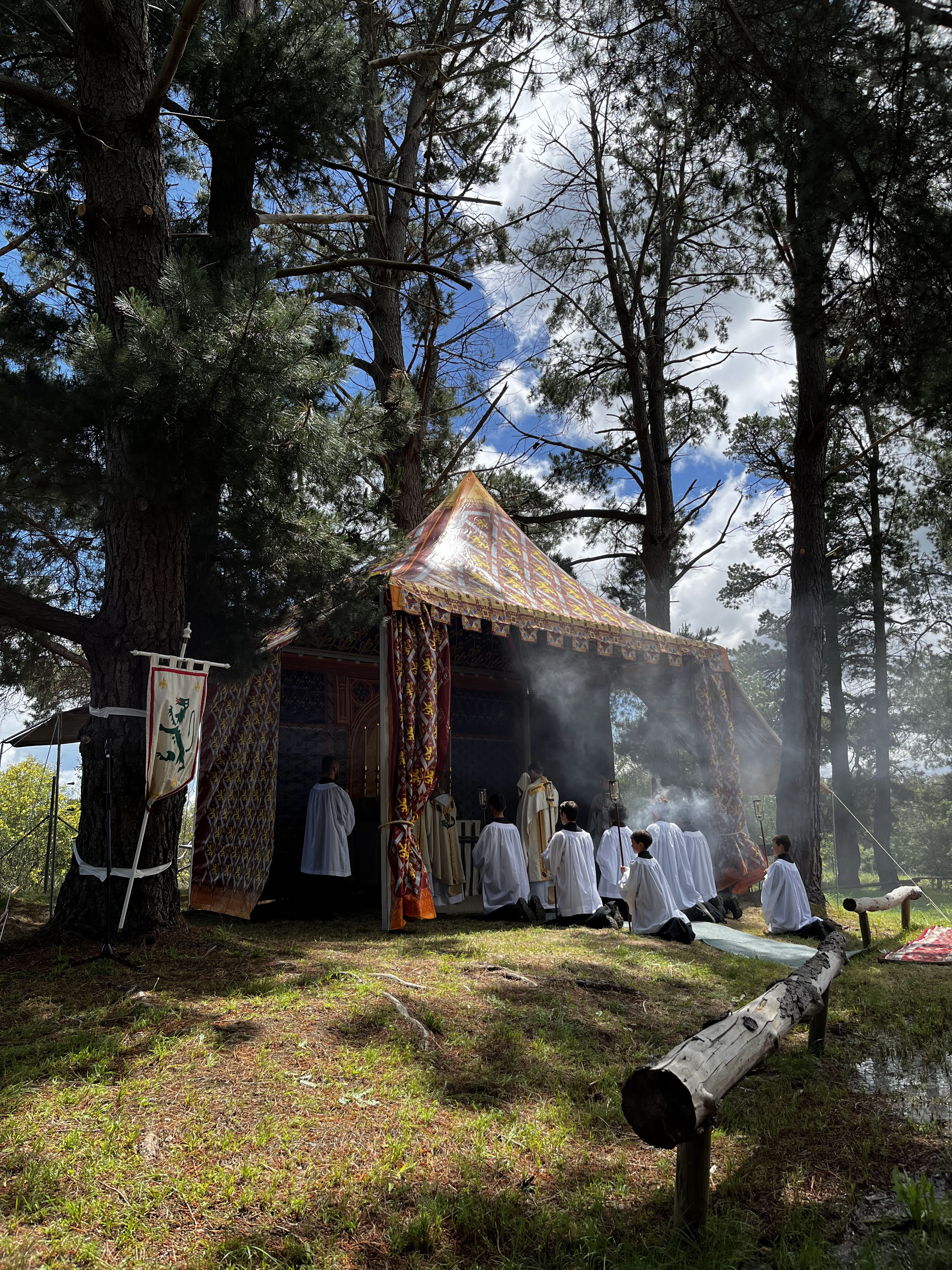
Solemn High Mass celebrated in the Traditional Roman Rite during the pilgrimage

== See also ==
- Camino de Santiago
- Pilgrimage to Chartres
- Catholic Church in Australia
