= Véronique de Montchalin =

French politician (born 1948)

Member of the National Assembly for Eure-et-Loir's 1st constituency
- In office 9 March 2024 – 9 June 2024
- Preceded by: Guillaume Kasbarian
- Succeeded by: Guillaume Kasbarian

Personal details
- Born: Véronique Louise Léonie Legué; 20 June 1948 (age 77) Chartres, France
- Party: Renaissance
- Relations: Amélie de Montchalin (niece-in-law)
- Occupation: Teacher

Véronique Louise Léonie de Lombard de Montchalin (French pronunciation: [veʁɔnik d(ə) mɔ̃ʃalɛ̃]; née Legué, 20 June 1948) is a French teacher and former politician who briefly represented the 1st constituency of Eure-et-Loir in the National Assembly from March to June 2024. A member of Renaissance (RE, formerly La République En Marche!), she was Guillaume Kasbarian's substitute in the 2017 and 2022 legislative election, and succeeded him in Parliament upon his appointment to the government as Minister Delegate for Housing.

== Honours ==
- Knight of the Ordre national du Mérite (2009)

== See also ==
- List of deputies of the 16th National Assembly of France
