= Guillaume Kasbarian =

French politician (born 1987)

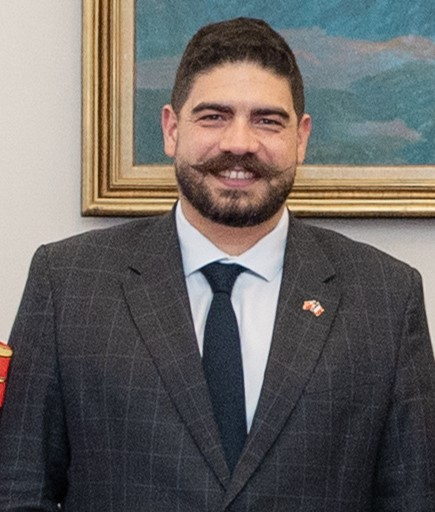
- Kasbarian in 2025

Minister of Civil Service, Streamlining and Public Sector Transformation
- In office 21 September 2024 – 23 December 2024
- Prime Minister: Michel Barnier
- Preceded by: Stanislas Guerini
- Succeeded by: Laurent Marcangeli

Minister Delegate for Housing
- In office 8 February 2024 – 21 September 2024
- Prime Minister: Gabriel Attal
- Preceded by: Patrice Vergriete
- Succeeded by: Valérie Létard

Member of the National Assembly for Eure-et-Loir's 1st constituency
- Incumbent
- Assumed office 24 January 2025
- Preceded by: Isabelle Mesnard
- In office 7 July 2024 – 21 October 2024
- Preceded by: Véronique de Montchalin
- Succeeded by: Isabelle Mesnard
- In office 21 June 2017 – 8 March 2024
- Preceded by: Jean-Pierre Gorges
- Succeeded by: Véronique de Montchalin

Personal details
- Born: 28 February 1987 (age 39) Marseille, France
- Party: Renaissance
- Education: ESSEC Business School
- Occupation: Manager in a strategy consulting company

Guillaume Kasbarian (French pronunciation: [ɡijom kasbaʁjɑ̃]; born 28 February 1987) is a French business consultant and politician who has represented the 1st constituency of the Eure-et-Loir department in the National Assembly from 2017 to 2024 and again since 2025. He is a member of Renaissance (RE, formerly La République En Marche!).

Over the course of 2024, Kasbarian briefly served as Minister Delegate for Housing in the government of Prime Minister Gabriel Attal and as Minister of Civil Service, Streamlining and Public Sector Transformation in the government of Prime Minister Michel Barnier.

== Education and early career ==
The son of two civil servants of Armenian descent, Kasbarian graduated from the ESSEC Business School in 2010. He subsequently worked as a consultant in a Parisian strategy consulting firm.

== Political career ==
=== Early beginnings ===
Kasbarian was the local representative of En Marche! for Eure-et-Loir from December 2016 to June 2017.

=== Member of the National Assembly, 2017–2024 ===
Kasbarian was elected deputy of the 1st constituency of Eure-et-Loir on 18 June 2017, after his victory over Franck Masselus in the second round of legislative elections.

In parliament, Kasbarian served as member of the Committee on Economic Affairs from 2017; he became the committee’s chair after the 2022 legislative elections. In addition to his committee assignments, he was part of the parliamentary friendship groups with Armenia and South Africa.

From November 2017, Kasbarian was part of LREM's executive board under the leadership of the party's successive chairmen Christophe Castaner and Stanislas Guerini.

== Political positions ==
In July 2019, Kasbarian voted in favor of the French ratification of the European Union's Comprehensive Economic and Trade Agreement (CETA) with Canada.

== See also ==
- 2017 French legislative election
