= Maison Picassiette =

Coordinates: 48°26′32″N 1°30′24″E

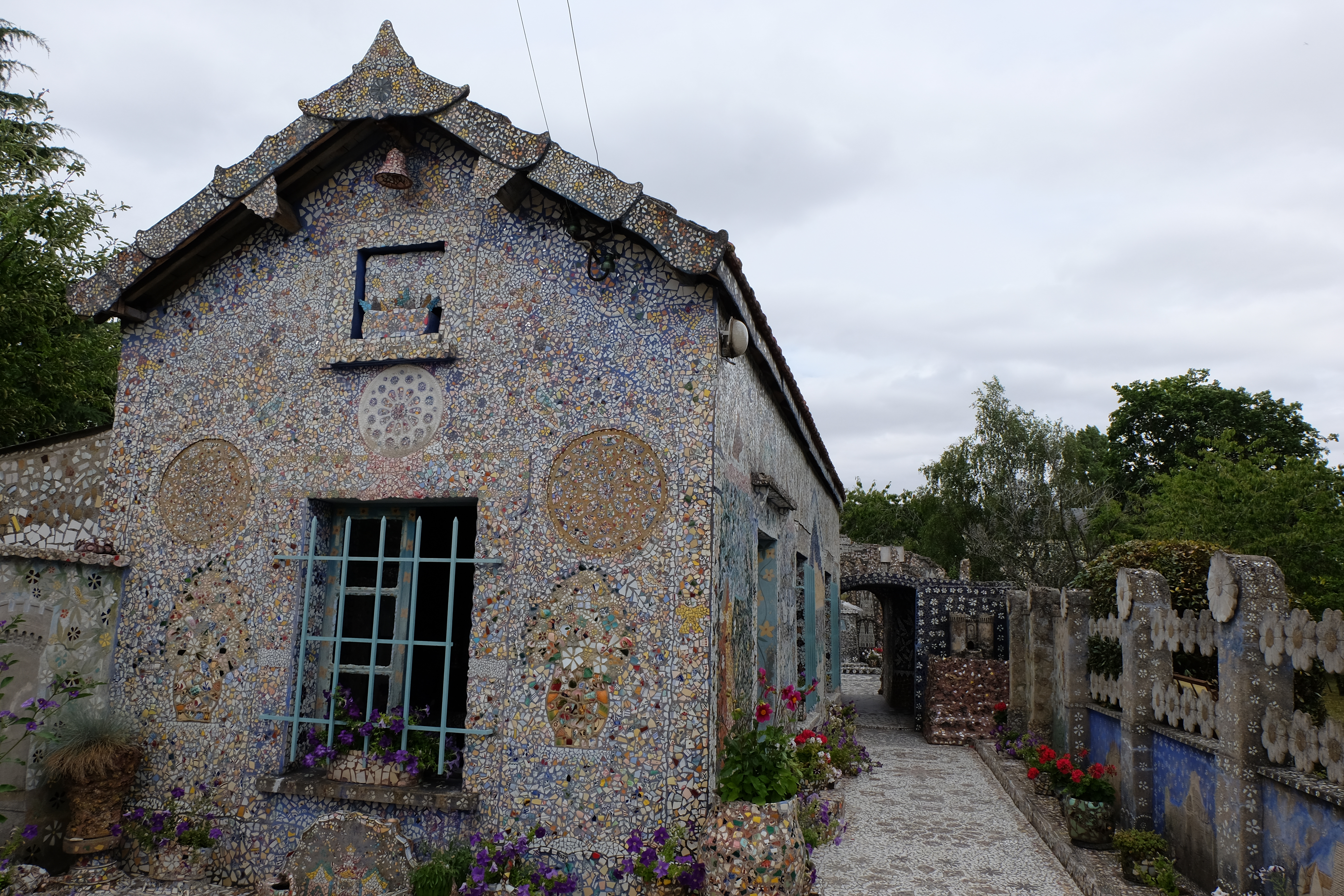
Maison Picassiette

The Maison Picassiette is an example of naïve architecture made up of earthenware and glass mosaics cast in cement. It is located in Chartres, France and depends on the Museum of Fine Arts of the city.

The house was built by one man, Raymond Isidore (8 September 1900 - 7 September 1964), municipal employee of the city of Chartres for which he worked as a roadmender, then sweeper of the cemetery.

Once his house was built, he had the idea of making frescoes covering everything little by little. His life was totally devoted to the construction and decoration of his house and the garden, in particular with the help of ceramic and porcelain debris, among others the plates that he obtained in public landfills, hence his nickname "picnic".

Considered an original, Raymond Isidore experienced a late media coverage: in the 1950s, the press took an interest in him. But his end of life, in his space saturated with mosaics, is tragic. His inspiration dried up, himself exhausted, he experienced mental disorders. On a stormy night, he fled from home through the fields, in the grip of an end-of-the-world delirium. Found and brought home, he died shortly after.
