= Hôtel de Ville, Chartres =

Town hall in Chartres, France

Hôtel de Ville
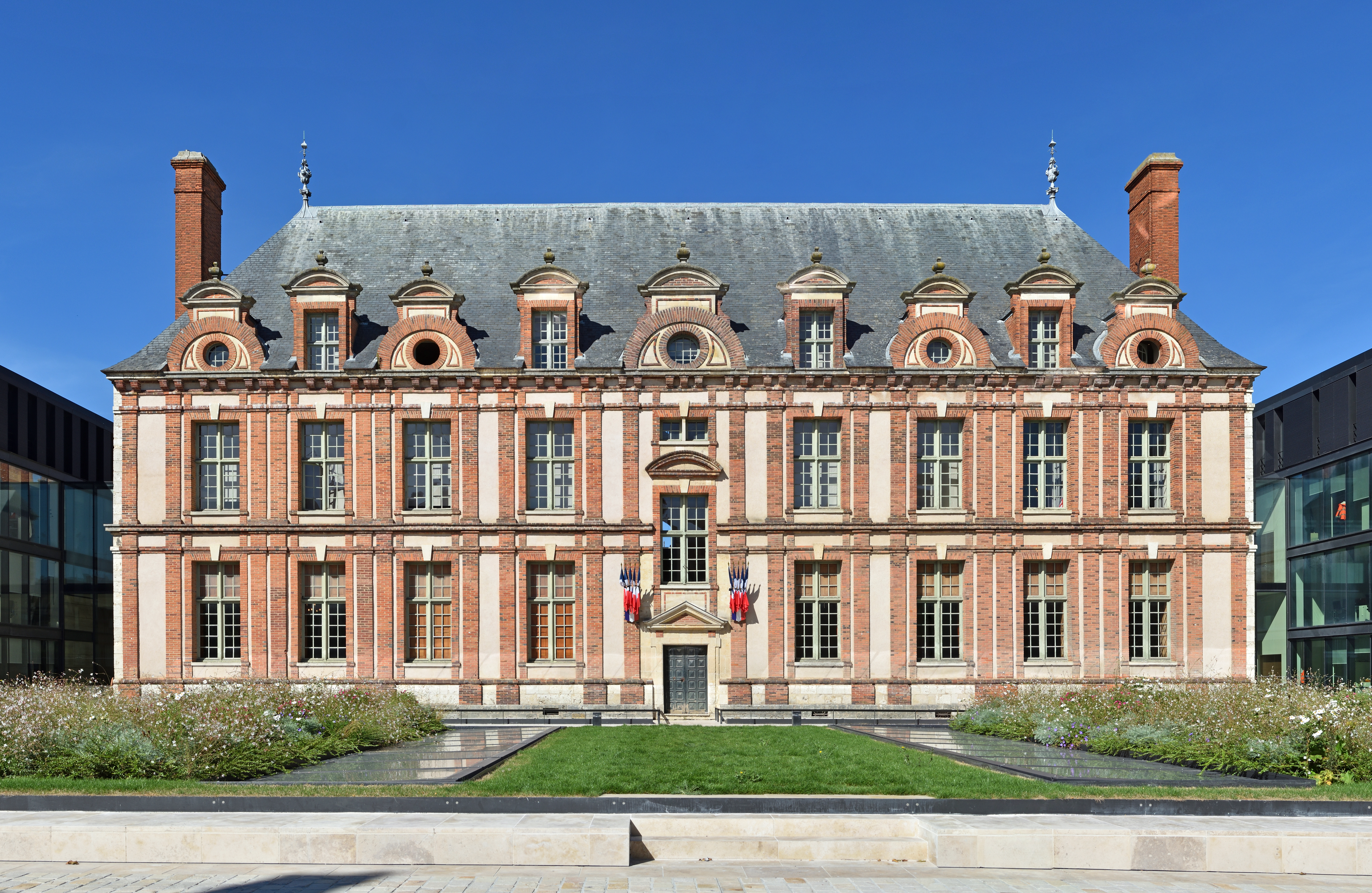
- The south frontage of the Hôtel de Ville, with the new glass-clad office blocks on either side, in September 2022

General information
- Type: City hall
- Architectural style: Neoclassical style
- Location: Chartres, France
- Coordinates: 48.4438°N 1.4891°E
- Completed: 1614

Monument historique
- Official name: Hôtel Montescot
- Type: Inscrit
- Designated: 1939
- Reference no.: PA00097002

The Hôtel de Ville (French pronunciation: [otɛl də vil], City Hall) is a municipal building in Chartres, Eure-et-Loir, northern France, standing on Rue de la Mairie. The building was designated a monument historique by the French government in 1939.

== History ==
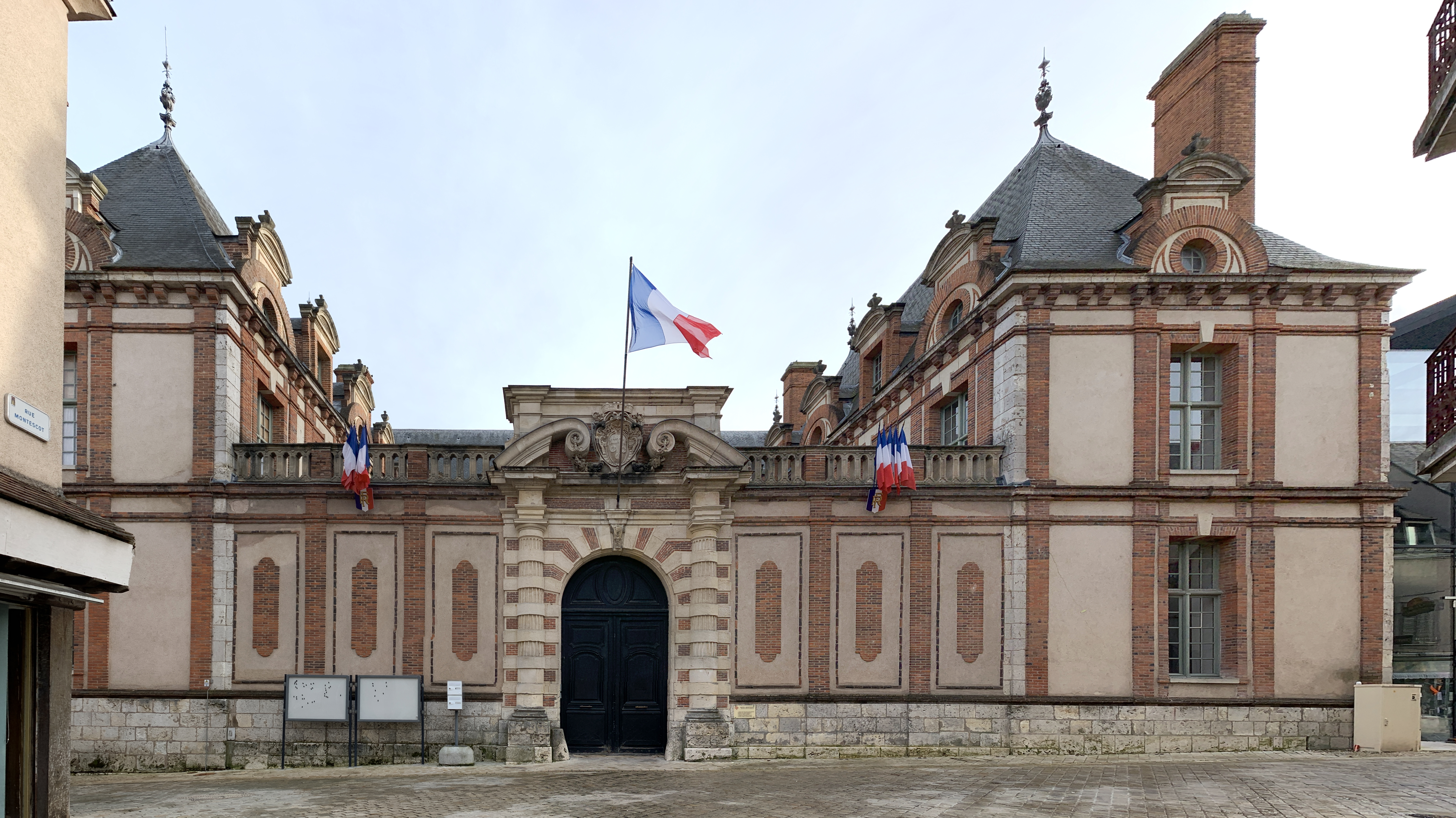
The north frontage with the grand portal and the courtyard behind

The building was commissioned in its original form by the administrator to the Duchy of Chartres, Jean de Montescot in 1546. After it was badly damaged during the French Wars of Religion, Jean's son, Claude de Montescot, decided to have it rebuilt in the early 17th century. The new building would be a typical hôtel particulier with a grand portal, a grand courtyard and two ornate façades. It was designed in the neoclassical style, built in ashlar stone with brick dressings and was completed in 1614.

The layout involved a two-storey main building (with an attic) at the back of a courtyard, with a wing on either side and a grand portal at the front, facing north onto Rue de la Mairie. The central bay featured a square headed doorway with a moulded surround surmounted by a cornice and a semi-circular panel containing a bust of Henry IV supported by two angels sitting on scrolls. There was a tall cross-window on the first floor and an oriel window at attic level. The design also involved a symmetrical south-facing frontage of nine bays facing onto Rue au Lin: on this side the central bay featured a square headed doorway surmounted by a triangular pediment on the ground floor, a tall cross-window surmounted by a segmental pediment at mezzanine level, and a small bipartite window high up on the first floor. The other bays, both in the courtyard and on the south-facing frontage, were fenestrated with cross-windows and flanked by brick pilasters.

After Claude de Montescot died in 1625, his son, Jacques de Montescot, inherited the building but was unable to maintain it and decided to sell it. The Ursulines of Saumur bought it and converted it into a school for impoverished girls. In 1761, the building was sold to the Daughters of Providence, who used it as an orphanage. In 1792, during the French Revolution, it was seized by the state and the daughters were driven out. It was then bought by the City of Chartres for use as a town hall in 1824, and a museum and a library were also established in the building.

The museum relocated to Cloître Notre Dame, to form the Musée des beaux-arts de Chartres, in 1939, but the library remained in the building and was badly damaged by inaccurate allied bombing on the night of 26 May 1944, during the Second World War. After the war, the main building was restored, and concrete office blocks were built to the east and west of the main building in 1960. In 2012, the city council decided to refurbish the main building, to demolish the 1960s concrete structures and to erect modern glass-clad structures in their place. A new underground linking gallery was created beneath the gardens to connect the new buildings to each other. The new structures were designed by Wilmotte & Associés and Trouvé-Tchépélev, built by Eiffage at a cost of €10.5 million, and were officially opened by the mayor, Jean-Pierre Gorges, in June 2022.
