= Pilgrimage to Chartres =

Annual pilgrimage from Paris to Chartres

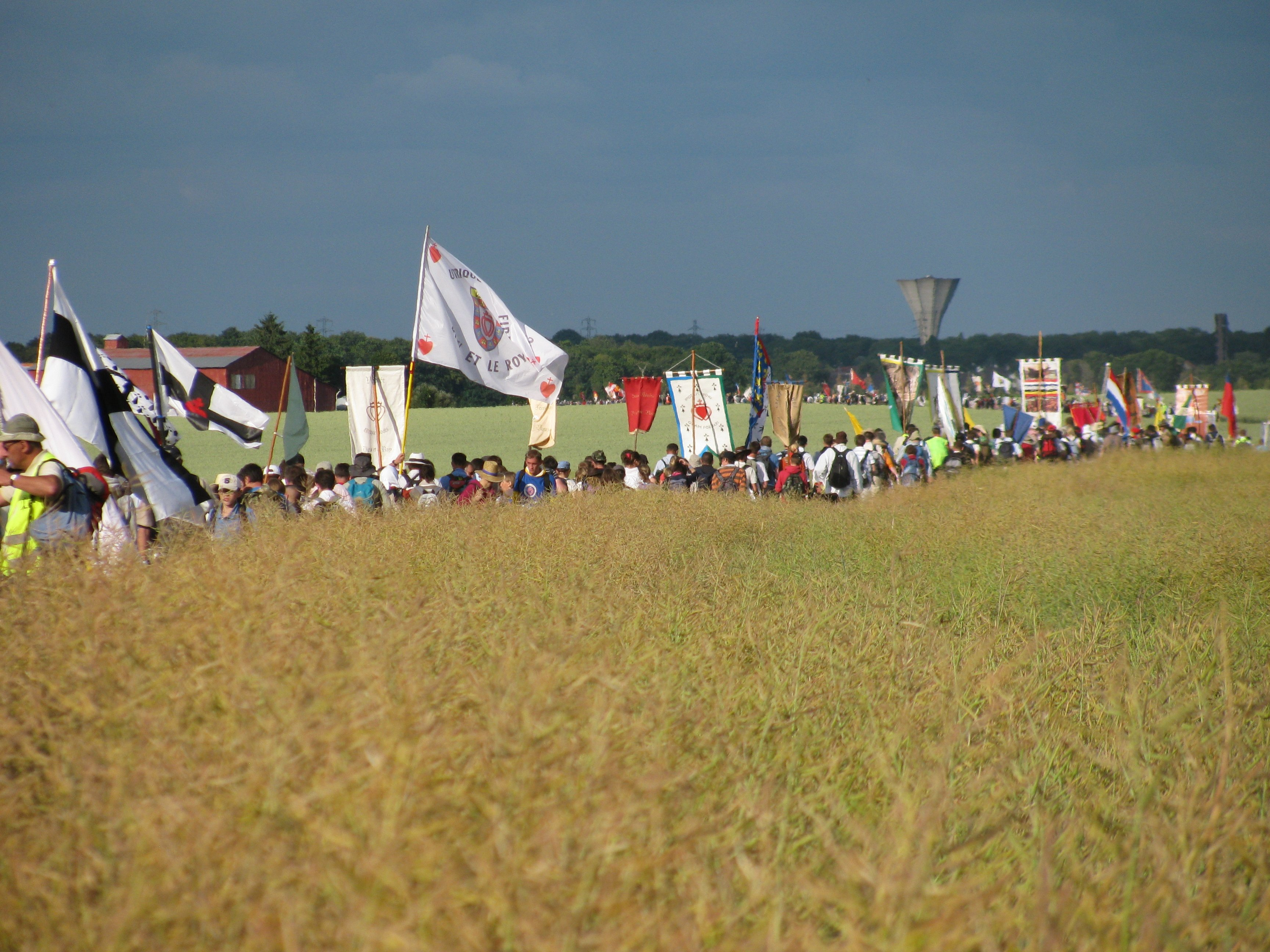
Pilgrims enroute 2011

The Chartres pilgrimage (French: pèlerinage de Chartres), also known in French as the pèlerinage de Chrétienté (English: pilgrimage of Christendom), is an annual pilgrimage from Notre-Dame de Paris to Notre-Dame de Chartres occurring around the Christian feast of Pentecost, organized by Notre-Dame de Chrétienté (English: Our Lady of Christendom), a Catholic lay non-profit organization based in Versailles, France. The pilgrimage characteristically celebrates the Traditional Roman Rite.

Although the pilgrimage has existed since 1983, the organization was not founded until 1991. In 2007, the 25th anniversary of the pilgrimage, amid rumours of a forthcoming papal document favouring use of the 1962 Roman Missal – the motu proprio Summorum Pontificum was in fact published on 7 July of that year – there were nearly ten thousand pilgrims in Chartres on Pentecost Monday May 28 despite difficult weather conditions.

There is also a pilgrimage in an opposite direction from Chartres to Paris called Pèlerinage de Tradition (Pilgrimage of Tradition) and organised by the Society of Saint Pius X.

== History ==
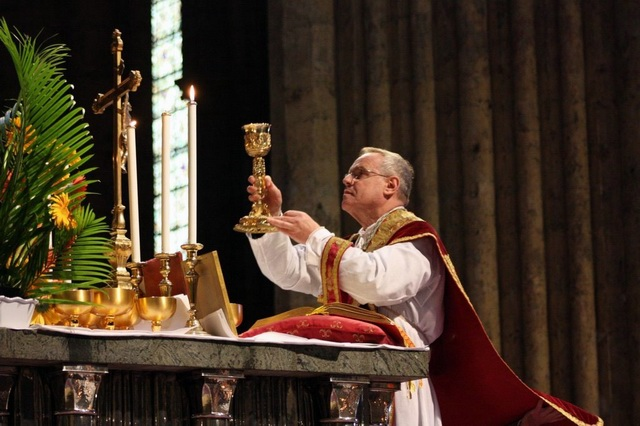
Elevation of the chalice at Traditional Roman Rite Mass in Notre-Dame de Chartres on the occasion of a Pilgrimage of Christendom.

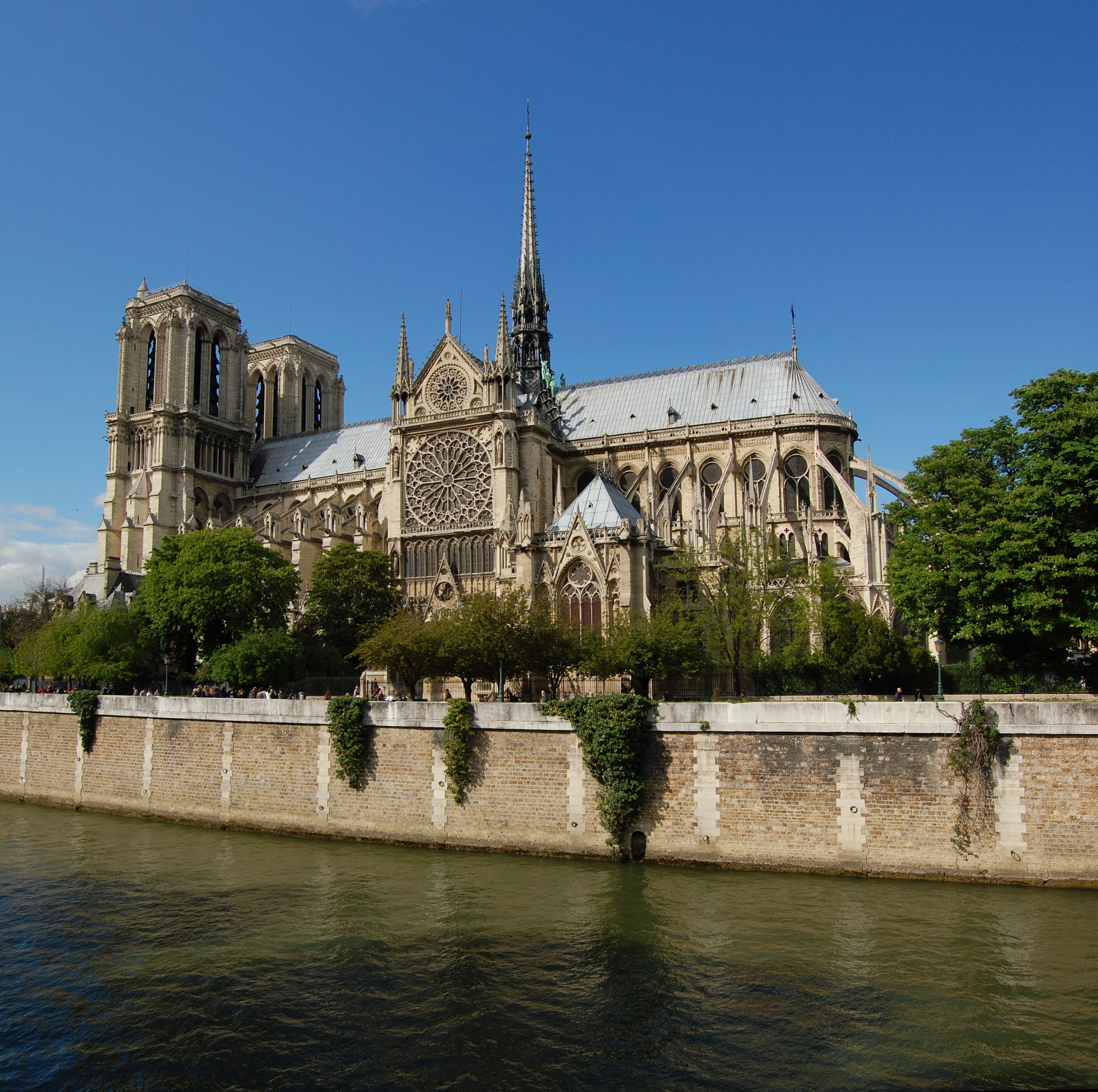
Notre-Dame de Paris.

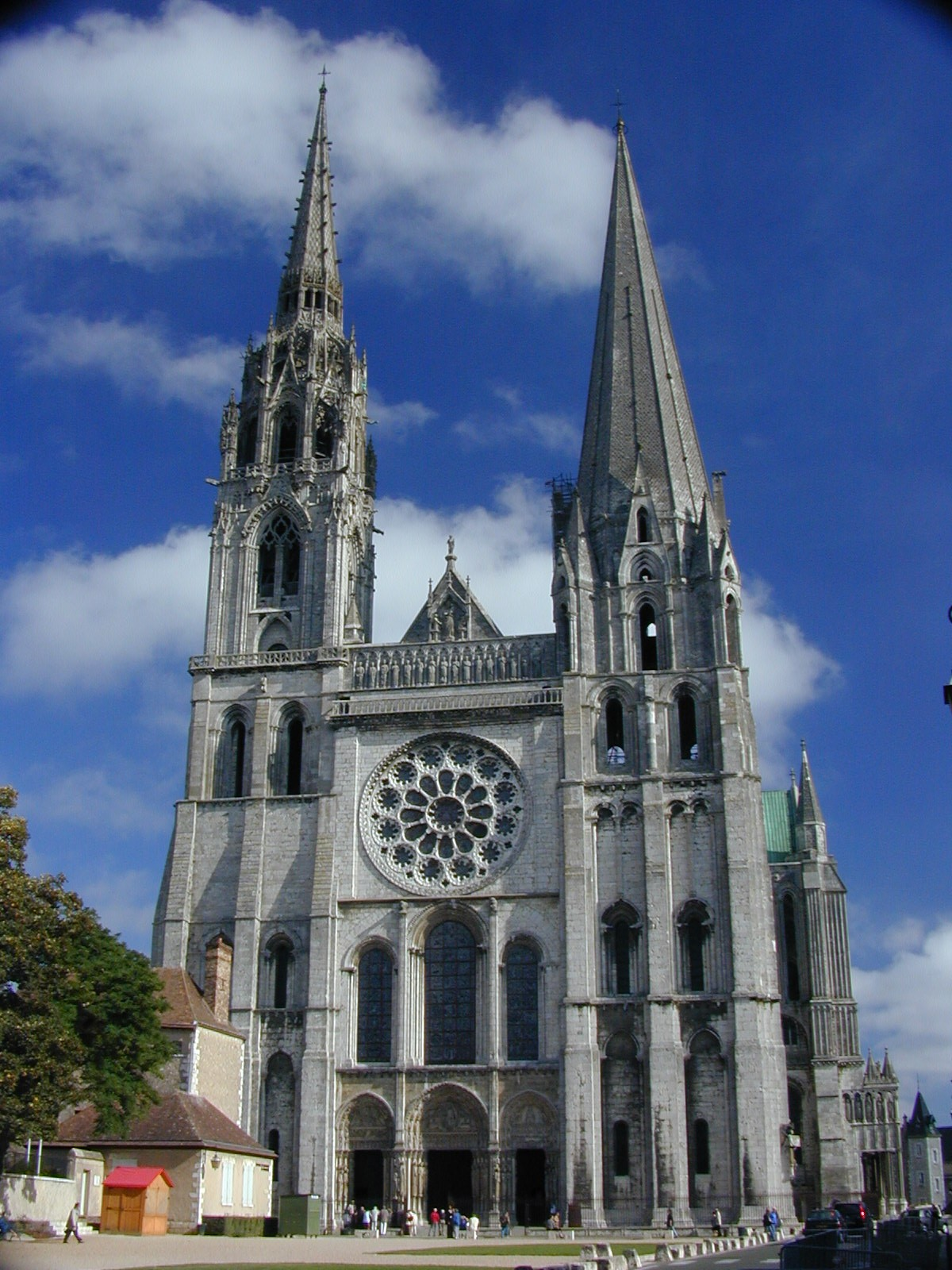
Notre-Dame de Chartres.

Chartres was a place of pilgrimage even before its Gothic cathedral was built and, by the end of the 12th century, became one of the most popular pilgrimage destinations in Europe. Its popularity is largely due to the presence of the Sancta Camisa, a piece of silk supposed to have been worn by the Blessed Virgin Mary at the birth of Jesus, donated to the cathedral by King Charles the Bald.

French poet and essayist, Charles Peguy, is credited with keeping the pilgrim's route from Paris to Chartres alive in the 20th century. For most of his life, Peguy was an ardent socialist who found himself at odds with the views of the Catholic Church. Shortly after experiencing a conversion of heart, Peguy made a pilgrimage from the Notre Dame Cathedral in Paris to Chartres Cathedral to pray for his son, who was very ill. His son recovered, and Peguy would continue to walk this pilgrimage route several times before he died in battle during the First World War. Peguy's friends continued to walk the pilgrimage in his memory, and a student pilgrimage grew to attract thousands in the mid 20th century.

After a period of decline in the 1960s, the modern Paris-Chartres pilgrimage was revived in 1983 by a traditionalist Catholic organization, Le Centre Henri-et-André-Charlier.

=== Split ===
In 1988, traditionalist archbishop Marcel Lefebvre consecrated four priests as bishops against the express order of Pope John Paul II. Due to the declaration of schism in the motu proprio, Ecclesia Dei, the traditionalist community was divided due to this event, and Archbishop Lefebvre's Society of Saint Pius X has since organized a separate pilgrimage which goes from Chartres to Paris called Le Pèlerinage de Tradition (Pilgrimage of Tradition). While the excommunications on the 4 surviving bishops were subsequently lifted in 2009 and in spite of the society's irregular canonical status in the Catholic Church, this pilgrimage attracts a large number of people, notably over 6000 in 2024.

In 1991, the Notre-Dame de Chrétienté association was founded to continue to manage the logistics of the Paris-Chartres pilgrimage.

=== Influence ===
The Chartres Pilgrimage has attracted significant interest especially amongst Catholics with a love for the Tridentine Mass. The annual event attracts thousands of Christians from across France, as well as a sizable number of international pilgrims. In 2023, for the first time in the pilgrimage's history, registrations had to be closed to latecomers due to logistical difficulties after more than 16,000 pilgrims registered. In 2024, registrations had to be closed to latecomers once again, despite extending the capacity of the event to accommodate more than 18,000 pilgrims. In 2025, a new record of presence has been reached of more than 19.000 pilgrims.

The Chartres Pilgrimage has also inspired similar events in other parts of the world.

- Argentina: The Nuestra Señora de la Cristiandad Pilgrimage, to the Basilica of Our Lady of Lujan.
- Australia: The Christus Rex Pilgrimage, from the Ballarat Cathedral to the Bendigo Cathedral.
- Canada: The Marie Reine du Canada Pilgrimage, from Saint-Joseph de Lanoraie to the Notre-Dame-du-Cap Basilica.
- England: The Walsingham Pilgrimage, from Ely to Walsingham, organized by the Latin Mass Society of England & Wales.
- Scotland: The Two Shrines Pilgrimage, from the National Shrine of St Andrew in St Mary’s Cathedral, Edinburgh, to the ruins of St Andrew’s mediaeval shrine in St Andrews, organized by the Confraternity of St Ninian.
- Italy: Nostra Signora della Cristianità, pilgrimage from Rome to Subiaco (Sacro Speco di San Benedetto).
- Spain: The Nuestra Señora de la Cristiandad Pilgrimage, from Oviedo Cathedral to the Covadonga Basilica.
- United States: The Pilgrimage for Restoration, to the National Shrine of the North American Martyrs.

== Themes ==
- 2025: Pour qu’Il règne, sur la terre comme au ciel (That He may reign, on earth as it is in heaven)
- 2024: Je veux voir Dieu (I want to see God)
- 2023: L'Eucharistie, Salut des âmes (The Eucharist, Salvation of souls)
- 2022: Sacré Coeur, Espoir et Salut des nations (Sacred Heart, Hope and Salvation of nations)
- 2021: Je suis la voie, la vérité, la vie (I am the way, the truth, the life)
- 2020: Saints anges, protégez-nous dans les combats (Holy angels, defend us in battle)
- 2019 : La paix du Christ par le règne du Christ (The peace of Christ through the reign of Christ)
- 2017 : Sainte Marie, Mère de Dieu (Holy Mary, Mother of God)
- 2016 : Viens, Esprit-Saint (Come, Holy Spirit)
- 2015 : Jésus-Christ sauveur du monde (Jesus Christ saviour of the world)
- 2014 : Au commencement, Dieu créa le Ciel et la terre (In the beginning God created the Heaven and the earth)
- 2013 : Education, chemin de sainteté (Education, the way of holiness)
- 2012 : Famille, berceau de la Chrétienté (Family, the cradle of Christendom)
- 2011 : L'Évangile de la vie (The Gospel of life)
- 2010 : L'Église est notre Mère (The Church is our Mother)
- 2009 : Que votre règne arrive (Thy kingdom come)
- 2008 : Chez nous, soyez Reine (Among us, be Queen)
- 2007 : Les marcheurs de Dieu (God's walkers)
- 2006 : Aimer, c'est tout donner (To love is to give all)
- 2005 : Notre-Dame, rempart de la chrétienté (Our Lady, bulwark of Christendom)
- 2004 : Un seul Seigneur, une seule foi, un seul baptême (One Lord alone, one faith alone, one baptism alone)
- 2003 : Chrétienté, vocation de la France (Christendom, calling of France)
- 2002 : Chrétienté, chemin de sainteté (Christendom, way of holiness)
- 2001 : Chrétienté, source de vie (Christendom, source of life)
- 2000 : La messe, cœur de la Chrétienté (The mass, heart of Christendom)
- 1999 : Que votre règne arrive (Thy kingdom come)
- 1998 : Esprit-Saint, Dieu de Force et de Sagesse (Holy Spirit, God of Strength and Wisdom)
- 1997 : Jésus-Christ, salut des nations (Jesus Christ, health of nations)
- 1996 : France, es-tu fidèle aux promesses de ton baptême? (France, are you faithful to your baptismal promises?)
- 1995 : France, éducatrice des peuples (France, teacher of peoples)
- 1994 : France, Fille aînée de l'Église (France, eldest daughter of the Church)
- 1993 : Pour que France, pour que Chrétienté continue (That France, that Christendom may continue)
- 1992 : Dieu premier servi (God served first)
- 1991 : Le Christ, notre liberté (Christ, our freedom)
- 1990 : Vers Notre-Dame de l'Europe de la Foi (Toward Our Lady of Europe of Faith)
- 1989 : Pélerinage du cœur et de la Croix (Pilgrimage of the heart and of the Cross)
- 1988 : Notre-Dame de Fatima—Espérance du Monde (Our Lady of Fatima—Hope of the World)
- 1987 : Demain la Chrétienté (Tomorrow Christendom)
- 1986 : Avec Notre-Dame (With Our Lady)
- 1985 : La famille, avenir de la Chrétienté (The family, the future of Christendom)
- 1984 : Pour la rédemption de la France (For the redemption of France)
- 1983 : Pour le renouveau de la jeunesse de France (For the renewal of the youth of France)

== See also ==
- Notre-Dame de Paris
- Notre-Dame de Chartres
- Priestly Fraternity of St. Peter
- St Benedict Patron of Europe Association
