= Jean-Pierre Gorges =

French politician; former mayor of Chartres

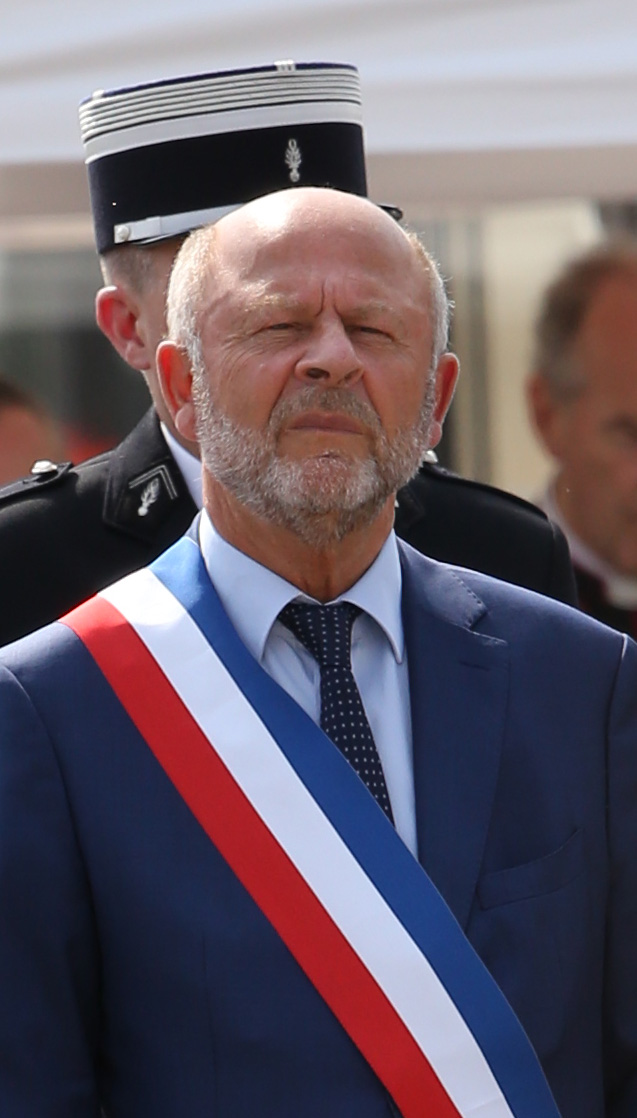
- Gorges in 2025

Mayor of Chartres
- In office 23 March 2001 – 28 March 2026
- Preceded by: Jean-Louis Guillain
- Succeeded by: Ladislas Vergne

Personal details
- Born: Jean-Pierre Gorges; 3 August 1953 (age 73) Gonesse, France
- Citizenship: France
- Party: The Republicans (France)
- Other political affiliations: Formerly Démocratie libérale

Jean-Pierre Gorges (born 3 August 1953 in Gonesse (Val-d'Oise), is a French politician. He served as mayor of Chartres from 2001 to 2026 and was president of the Chartres Métropole agglomeration community during the same period. He was deputy for the first constituency of Eure-et-Loir from 2002 to 2017.

== First steps into politics ==
In the 1995 municipal elections in Chartres, he was one of Mathieu Brétillard's running mates, who later joined Jean-Pierre Chevènement's Republican Pole, which he has since left.

In 1998, Jean-Pierre Gorges ran for the General Council of Eure-et-Loir, in the Canton of Chartres-Nord-Est, on a list with the label "Divers droite". He obtained only 8.79% and was therefore unable to stand in the second round. Christian Gigon, the mayor of Champhol, was finally elected.

== Mayor of Chartres ==
Following the 1995 municipal election in Chartres, Jean-Pierre Gorges decided to get involved in local life, first by creating the association "Chartres, votre ville", which mainly denounced the financial management of the city by the socialist municipality, whose mayor was Georges Lemoine. This association developed within Chartres' civil society. Joining Démocratie libérale at its creation in 1998, Jean-Pierre Gorges became one of the main opponents to the municipality in place.

In the 2001 municipal election, Éric Chevée (UDF) formed a "ticket" with Marie-Claire Carrère-Gée (RPR), recently established in Eure-et-Loir, with the official support of RPR, the UDF. Jean-Pierre Gorges formed a dissident list supported by Démocratie libérale, bringing together personalities from the RPR, the UDF and the MPF as well as from civil society.

Jean-Pierre Gorges won the right-wing primary in the first round (10 March 2001), beating the Chevée/Carrère-Gée list by 224 votes. His list came first in the second round, ahead of the united list of the left led by Pascal Ory, resulting from the merger of the list officially supported by the Socialist Party (France) and the list of the alternative and associative left "Energies citoyennes".

Jean-Pierre Gorges became mayor of Chartres and was elected president of the Chartres agglomeration community (COMACh) where the right wing had become the majority thanks to his victory in Chartres and that of Jacques Morland (DVD) in Lucé. On the initiative of Jean-Pierre Gorges, the agglomeration abandoned the COMACh sign in favour of the name "Chartres Métropole".

He was re-elected in 2008, 2014 and 2020. In the 2026 municipal elections, his list was defeated in the second round by Ladislas Vergne, who became mayor of Chartres on 28 March 2026.

== Deputy ==
Jean-Pierre Gorges has been a member of parliament since 2002 and was re-elected in 2007 with a lead of only 59 votes. He is a member of the UMP group and the finance committee of the Assemblée nationale. Two appeals were lodged with the Conseil constitutionnel regarding the validity of this election.

The annulment of the election by the Constitutional Council on 19 November 2007 was based on "the organisation by Mr Gorges, in his capacity as president of the public housing office of Chartres, of 18 housing inauguration ceremonies between March and April 2007, in which he participated". "The repetition of these events within a short period of time is of the nature of a manoeuvre which, in view of the small difference in the number of votes (57), altered the result of the election", the Constitutional Council ruled.

He was defeated by the socialist candidate Françoise Vallet in the 3 February 2008 legislative by-election, receiving 43.74% of the vote against 56.26% for Vallet.

He was the author of one of the six appeals lodged against this election on 13 February. These appeals denounced the intrusion of the Leclerc hypermarket in Luisant and its CEO Olivier Ducatel. The latter reproached Jean-Pierre Gorges for preventing him from installing his supermarket in the Barjouville area. The latter asserted that he preferred to defend small businesses. The distribution of leaflets calling for a vote against the mayor of Chartres, the fact that Françoise Vallet went to this hypermarket in the company of Ségolène Royal and that she demonstrated in front of the Hôtel de Ville (town hall) of Chartres with employees are the reasons given to explain these appeals.

The election of Françoise Vallet was annulled in June 2008 by the Constitutional Council which declared her ineligible. On 3, Jean-Pierre Gorges publicly announced his candidacy for the legislative by-election that took place in September 2008. He won the by-election with 50.94% of the votes against 49.06% for David Lebon (PS), and thus regained his seat as deputy.

Nominated by the UMP to be a candidate in the first constituency of Eure-et-Loir in 2012. In the second round, the Front National d'Eure-et-Loir called on its voters to vote for Jean-Pierre Gorges, he won in the second round with 50.8% of the vote, on 17. This election is also tainted, according to a testimony reported by Mediapart.

The MP Jean-Pierre Gorges is particularly known for his position on the issue of France's interventions in Iraq and Syria: he is the only MP to have voted against the strikes in Iraq as well as on the extension of the strikes in Syria.

== 2017 Presidential election ==
Jean-Pierre Gorges was, in January 2016, one of the four candidates for the presidency of the Nous Citoyens party, but withdrew before the start of the election.

On 9 September 2016, Jean-Pierre Gorges announced his candidacy for the French presidential election 2017. Presenting himself as an "independent Republican", he chose to run regardless of the wishes of his political family. He created his own movement, named "La France, c'est vous!", after the title of his book-programme published by Cherche midi.

== 2022 Presidential election ==
On Friday 10 September 2021, the mayor of Chartres received the candidate for the right-wing primary Valérie Pécresse in view of the 2022 French presidential election. He assured her of his full support for the next election. On 24 September, he was appointed speaker for the candidate and president of the Ile-de-France, along with thirty other political figures. This consists of relaying Valérie Pécresse's ideas locally.

== Summary of mandates ==
- 23 March 2001 – 28 March 2026: Mayor of Chartres - 2001 – 2026: President of the Chartres Métropole agglomeration community - 19 June 2002 – 29 November 2007: Member of Parliament for the Eure-et-Loir's 1st constituency - 14 September 2008 – 20 June 2017: Member of Parliament for the Eure-et-Loir's 1st constituency

== Controversies ==
At the exit of a city council on 22 November 2018, Jean-Pierre Gorges threatens Paul Larouturou of the French TV show Quotidien, as the journalist was questioning him about the mayor's recent refusal to set up a logistics company.

On 29 January 2021, he was convicted by the judicial court, for public insults against the ecologist city council Quentin Guillemain, to whom he had said he "deserved two slaps".

On 17 March 2021, during a municipal council meeting, the mayor made dismissive comments about climate science, reported by the opposition.
