= Chartres =

Prefecture and commune in Centre-Val de Loire, France

- Prefecture and commune
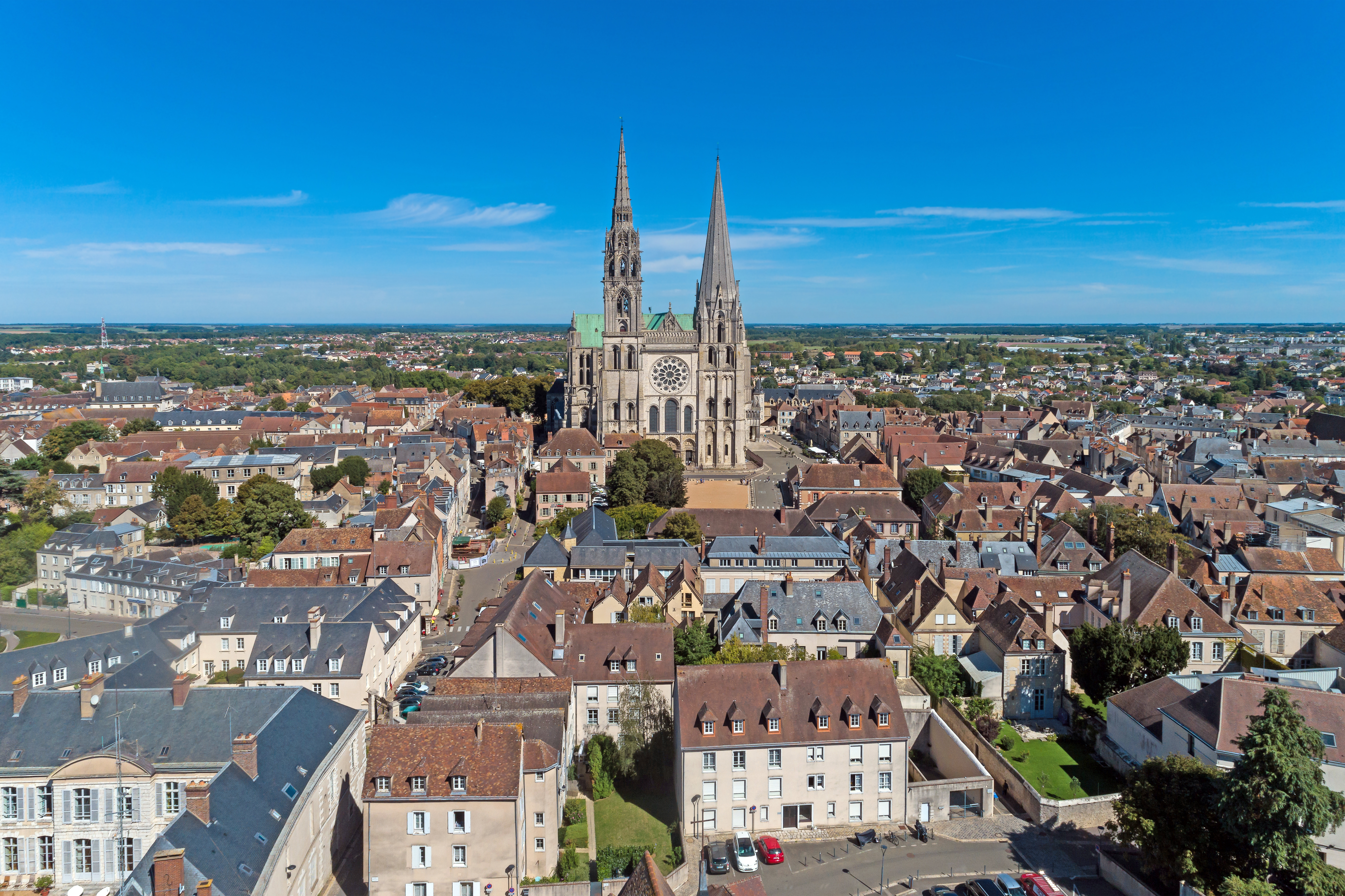
- Cityscape with the Chartres Cathedral at the centre

- Coat of arms
- Location of Chartres
- Location within France Location within Centre-Val de Loire
- Coordinates: 48°27′22″N 1°29′02″E
- Country: France
- Region: Centre-Val de Loire
- Department: Eure-et-Loir
- Arrondissement: Chartres
- Canton: Chartres-1, 2 and 3
- Intercommunality: CA Chartres Métropole

Government
  - Mayor (2020–2026): Jean-Pierre Gorges
- Area^{1}: 16.85 km^{2} (6.51 sq mi)
  - Metro (2020): 1,923.2 km^{2} (742.6 sq mi)
- Elevation: 142 m (466 ft)
- Highest elevation: 161 m (528 ft)
- Lowest elevation: 121 m (397 ft)
- Population (2023): 38,324
  - Density: 2,274/km^{2} (5,891/sq mi)
  - Metro (2023): 171,665
  - Metro density: 89.260/km^{2} (231.18/sq mi)
- Time zone: UTC+01:00 (CET)
  - Summer (DST): UTC+02:00 (CEST)
- INSEE/Postal code: 28085 /28000
- ^{1} French Land Register data, which excludes lakes, ponds, glaciers > 1 km^{2} (0.386 sq mi or 247 acres) and river estuaries.

Chartres (French pronunciation: [ʃaʁtʁ]) is the prefecture of the Eure-et-Loir department in the Centre-Val de Loire region in France. It is located about 90 km (56 mi) southwest of Paris. As of 2023, there were 171,665 inhabitants in the metropolitan area of Chartres (as defined by the INSEE), 38,324 of whom lived in the city (commune) of Chartres proper.

Chartres is famous worldwide for the Chartres Cathedral. Mostly constructed between 1193 and 1250, this Gothic cathedral is in an exceptional state of preservation. The majority of the original stained glass windows are intact, while the architecture has seen only minor changes since the early 13th century. Part of the old town, including most of the library associated with the School of Chartres, was destroyed by Allied bombs in 1944.

== History ==
Chartres was one of the principal towns in Gaul of the Carnutes, a Celtic tribe. In the Gallo-Roman period, it was called Autricum, name derived from the river Autura (Eure), and afterwards civitas Carnutum, "city of the Carnutes", from which Chartres got its name. The city was raided and burned down by the Norsemen in 858, and once again besieged, this time unsuccessfully, by them in 911.

During the Middle Ages, it was the most important town of the Beauce. It gave its name to a county which was held by the counts of Blois, and the counts of Champagne, and afterwards by the House of Châtillon, a member of which sold it to the Crown in 1286.

In 1417, during the Hundred Years' War, Chartres fell into the hands of the English, from whom it was recovered in 1432. In 1528, it was raised to the rank of a duchy by Francis I.

In 1568, during the second war of Religion, Chartres was unsuccessfully besieged by the Huguenot leader, the Prince of Condé. It was finally taken by the royal troops of Henry IV on 19 April 1591. On Sunday, 27 February 1594, the cathedral of Chartres was the site of the coronation of Henry IV after he converted to the Catholic faith, the only king of France whose coronation ceremony was not performed in Reims.

In 1674, Louis XIV raised Chartres from a duchy to a duchy peerage in favour of his nephew, Duke Philippe II of Orléans. The title of Duke of Chartres was hereditary in the House of Orléans, and given to the eldest son of the Duke of Orléans.

During the 1870–1871 Franco-Prussian War, Chartres was seized by the Germans on 2 October 1870, and continued during the rest of the war to be an important centre of operations.

During World War II, the city suffered heavy damage by bombing and during the battle of Chartres in August 1944, but its cathedral was spared by an American Army officer who challenged the order to destroy it. On 16 August 1944, Colonel Welborn Barton Griffith, Jr. questioned the necessity of destroying the cathedral and volunteered to go behind enemy lines to find out whether the Germans were using it as an observation post. With his driver, Griffith proceeded to the cathedral and, after searching it all the way up its bell tower, confirmed to headquarters that it was empty of Germans. The order to destroy the cathedral was withdrawn.

Colonel Griffith was killed in action later on that day in the town of Lèves, 3.5 kilometres (2.2 miles) north of Chartres. For his heroic action both at Chartres and Lèves, Colonel Griffith posthumously received several decorations awarded by the president of the United States and the U.S. military, and also from the French government.

Following deep reconnaissance missions in the region by the 3rd Cavalry Group and units of the 1139 Engineer Combat Group, and after heavy fighting in and around the city, Chartres was liberated, on 18 August 1944, by the U.S. 5th Infantry and 7th Armored Divisions belonging to the XX Corps of the U.S. Third Army commanded by Lieutenant General George S. Patton, Jr.

== Climate ==
Climate data for Chartres, elevation: 155 m (509 ft) (1991–2020 normals, extremes 1920–present)
Month	Jan	Feb	Mar	Apr	May	Jun	Jul	Aug	Sep	Oct	Nov	Dec	Year
Record high °C (°F)	16.1 (61.0)	20.5 (68.9)	24.8 (76.6)	28.2 (82.8)	34.0 (93.2)	37.2 (99.0)	41.4 (106.5)	39.6 (103.3)	35.5 (95.9)	29.8 (85.6)	20.9 (69.6)	17.0 (62.6)	41.4 (106.5)
Mean daily maximum °C (°F)	6.9 (44.4)	8.2 (46.8)	12.2 (54.0)	15.6 (60.1)	19.0 (66.2)	22.5 (72.5)	25.2 (77.4)	25.3 (77.5)	21.4 (70.5)	16.2 (61.2)	10.6 (51.1)	7.3 (45.1)	15.9 (60.6)
Daily mean °C (°F)	4.3 (39.7)	4.8 (40.6)	7.8 (46.0)	10.3 (50.5)	13.8 (56.8)	17.0 (62.6)	19.4 (66.9)	19.4 (66.9)	15.9 (60.6)	12.1 (53.8)	7.6 (45.7)	4.8 (40.6)	11.4 (52.5)
Mean daily minimum °C (°F)	1.8 (35.2)	1.5 (34.7)	3.4 (38.1)	5.1 (41.2)	8.5 (47.3)	11.6 (52.9)	13.5 (56.3)	13.4 (56.1)	10.5 (50.9)	8.0 (46.4)	4.5 (40.1)	2.2 (36.0)	7.0 (44.6)
Record low °C (°F)	−18.4 (−1.1)	−15.0 (5.0)	−11.0 (12.2)	−4.9 (23.2)	−1.0 (30.2)	1.4 (34.5)	0.9 (33.6)	3.0 (37.4)	0.5 (32.9)	−5.4 (22.3)	−11.3 (11.7)	−14.2 (6.4)	−18.4 (−1.1)
Average precipitation mm (inches)	49.9 (1.96)	41.5 (1.63)	43.5 (1.71)	44.6 (1.76)	55.3 (2.18)	51.5 (2.03)	51.0 (2.01)	47.7 (1.88)	46.0 (1.81)	58.4 (2.30)	56.0 (2.20)	60.7 (2.39)	606.1 (23.86)
Average precipitation days (≥ 1.0 mm)	10.3	9.3	8.9	8.6	9.3	8.4	7.1	6.9	7.6	9.8	11.0	11.5	108.8
Average snowy days	3.6	4.7	1.9	0.8	0.0	0.0	0.0	0.0	0.0	0.0	0.9	2.7	14.5
Average relative humidity (%)	89	85	80	75	77	76	74	75	79	86	89	90	81.3
Mean monthly sunshine hours	63.5	87.6	140.3	183.6	208.7	221.5	230.3	220.0	181.1	118.4	72.4	60.1	1,787.4
Source 1: Meteociel (snow days 1981-2010)
Source 2: Infoclimat.fr (humidity, 1961–1990)

== Demographics ==
Historical population

Year	Pop.	±% p.a.
1793	15,000	—
1800	13,794	−1.19%
1806	13,809	+0.02%
1821	13,714	−0.05%
1831	14,439	+0.52%
1836	14,750	+0.43%
1841	16,383	+2.12%
1846	17,353	+1.16%
1851	18,234	+1.00%
1856	18,925	+0.75%
1861	19,531	+0.63%
1866	19,442	−0.09%
1872	19,580	+0.12%
1876	20,468	+1.12%
1881	21,080	+0.59%
1886	21,903	+0.77%
1891	23,108	+1.08%
1896	23,182	+0.06%
1901	23,431	+0.21%

Year	Pop.	±% p.a.
1906	23,219	−0.18%
1911	24,103	+0.75%
1921	23,349	−0.32%
1926	24,630	+1.07%
1931	25,357	+0.58%
1936	27,077	+1.32%
1946	26,422	−0.24%
1954	28,750	+1.06%
1962	31,495	+1.15%
1968	34,469	+1.52%
1975	38,928	+1.75%
1982	37,119	−0.68%
1990	39,595	+0.81%
1999	40,361	+0.21%
2007	39,767	−0.19%
2012	38,889	−0.45%
2017	38,578	−0.16%
2023	38,324	−0.11%

Source: EHESS and INSEE (1968–2023)

== Geography ==
Chartres is built on a hill on the left bank of the river Eure. Its renowned medieval Chartres Cathedral is at the top of the hill, and its two spires are visible from miles away across the flat surrounding lands. To the southeast stretches the fertile plain of Beauce, the "granary of France", in which Chartres is the commercial centre.

== Main sights ==
=== Cathedrals and churches ===
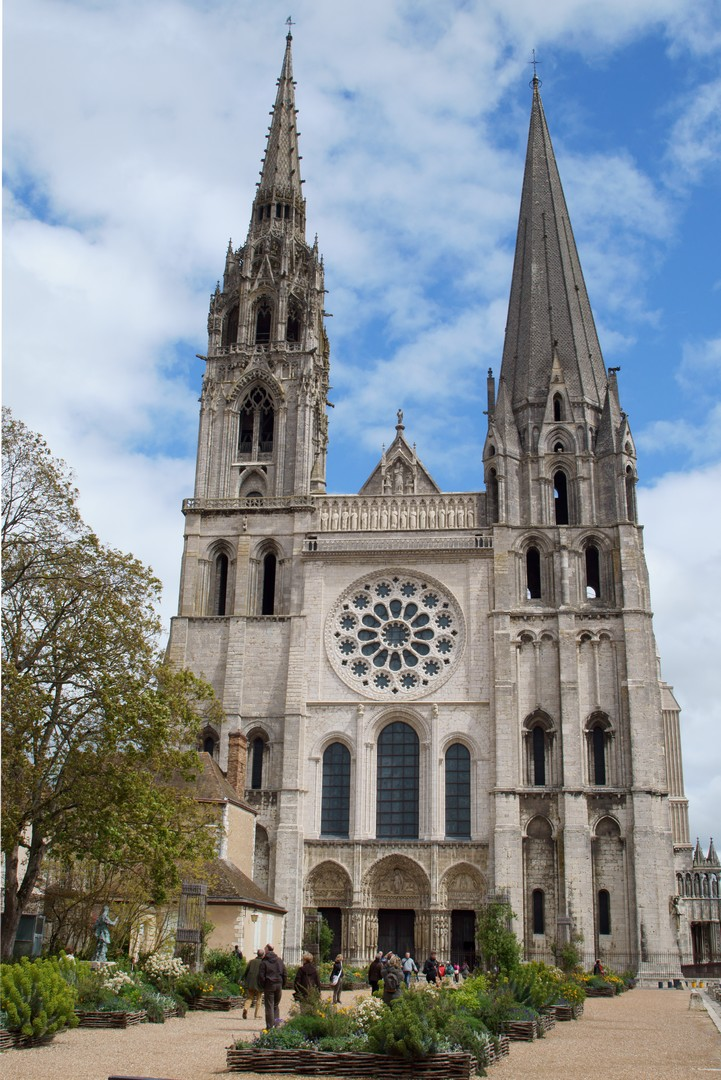
Cathedral of Chartres

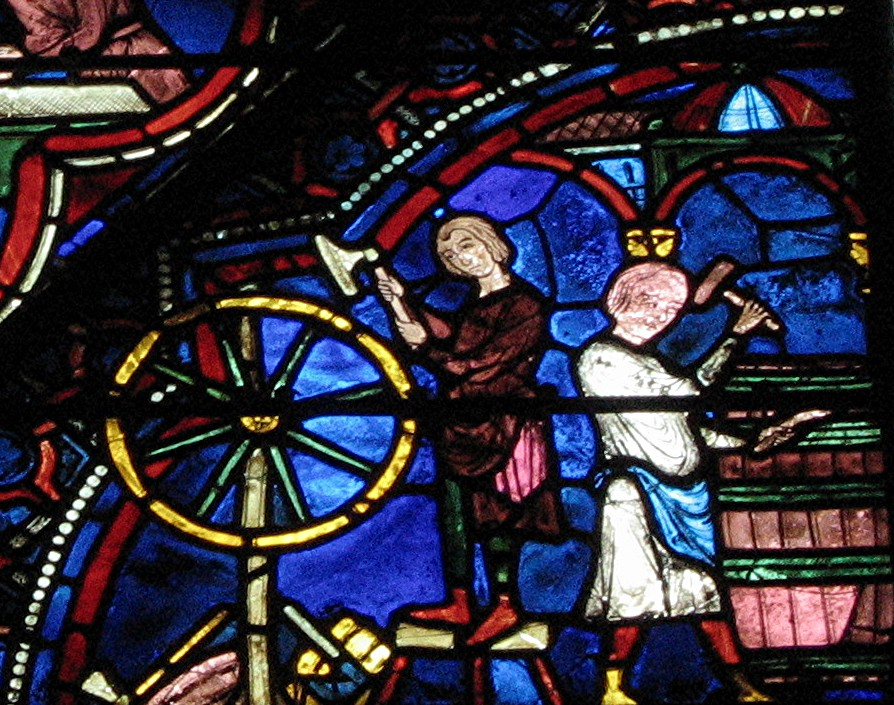
The famous "Chartres blue"

South elevation, lithography 1864

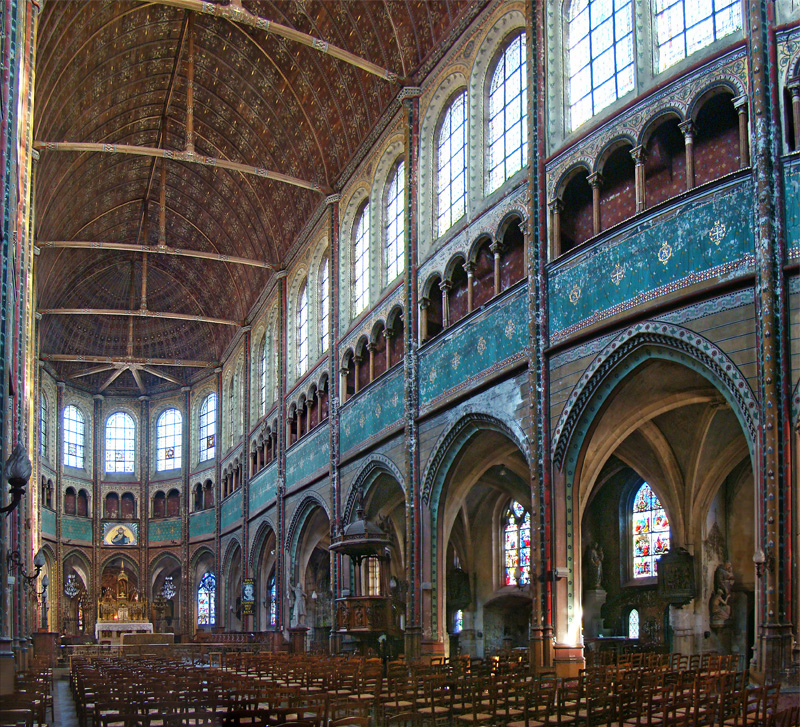
The Church of Saint Aignan

Chartres is best known for its cathedral, the Cathédrale Notre-Dame de Chartres, which is considered one of the finest and best preserved Gothic cathedrals in France and in Europe. Its historical and cultural importance has been recognized by its inclusion on the UNESCO list of World Heritage Sites.

It was built on the site of the former Chartres cathedral of Romanesque architecture, which was destroyed by fire in 1194 (that former cathedral had been built on the ruins of an ancient Celtic temple, later replaced by a Roman temple). Begun in 1205, the construction of Notre-Dame de Chartres was completed 66 years later.

The stained glass windows of the cathedral were financed by guilds of merchants and craftsmen, and by wealthy noblemen, whose names appear at the bottom.

It is not known how the famous and unique blue, bleu de Chartres, of the glass was created, and it has been impossible to replicate it. The French author Michel Pastoureau says that it could also be called bleu de Saint-Denis.

The Église Saint-Pierre de Chartres was the church of the Benedictine Abbaye Saint-Père-en-Vallée, founded in the 7th century by queen Balthild. At time of its construction, the abbey was outside the walls of the city. It contains fine stained glass and, formerly, twelve representations of the apostles in enamel, created about 1547 by Léonard Limosin, which now can be seen in the fine arts museum.

Other noteworthy churches of Chartres are Saint-Aignan (13th, 16th and 17th centuries), and Saint-Martin-au-Val (12th century), inside the Saint-Brice hospital.

=== Museums ===
- Musée des Beaux-Arts, Fine arts museum, housed in the former episcopal palace adjacent to the cathedral.
- Le Centre international du vitrail, a workshop-museum and cultural center devoted to stained glass art, located 50 metres (160 feet) from the cathedral.
- Conservatoire du machinisme et des pratiques agricoles, an agricultural museum.
- Musée le grenier de l'histoire, history museum specializing in military uniforms and accoutrements, in Lèves, a suburb of Chartres.
- Muséum des sciences naturelles et de la préhistoire, Natural science and Prehistory Museum (closed since 2015).

=== Other sights ===
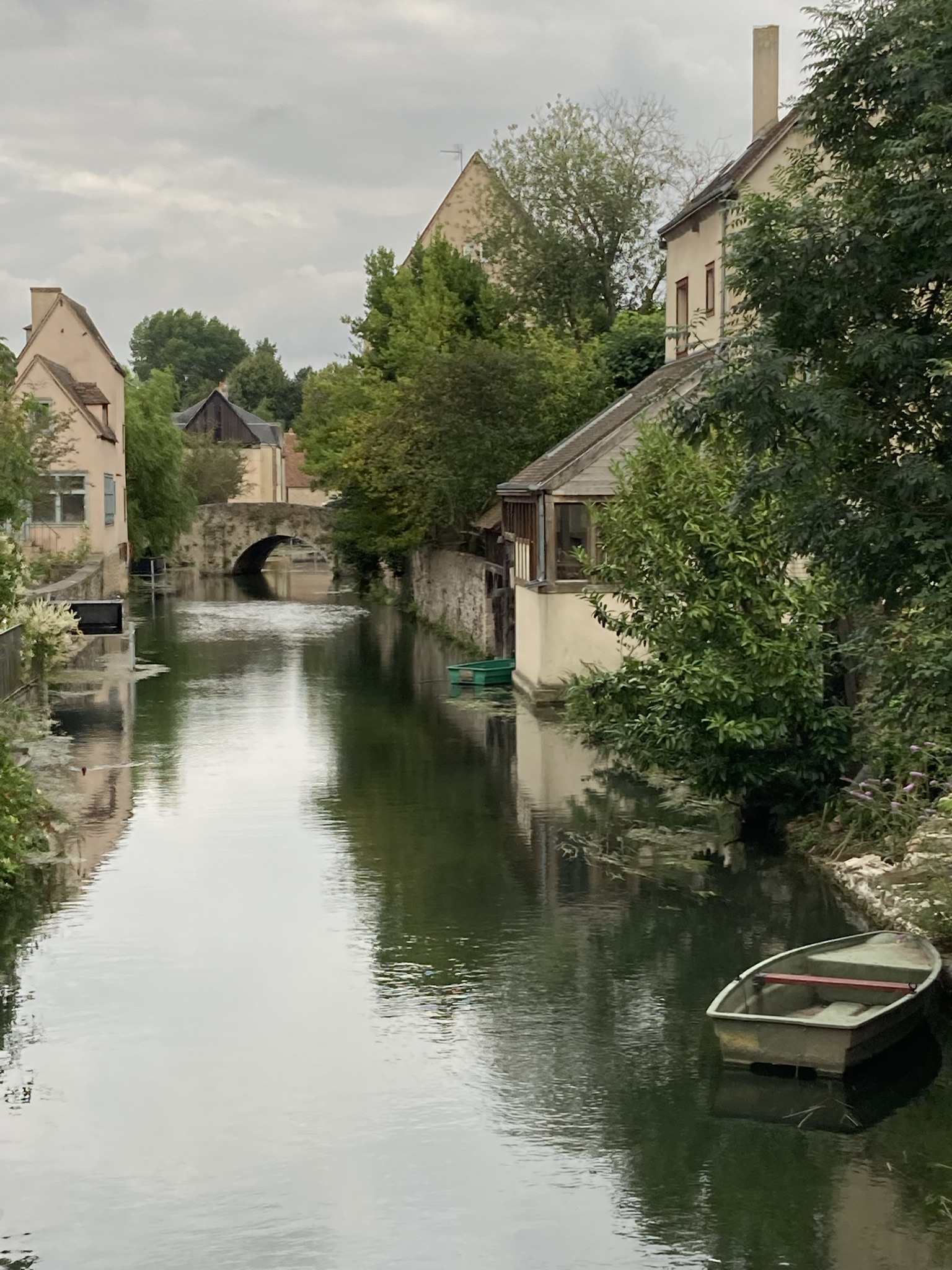
The Eure river running through Chartres

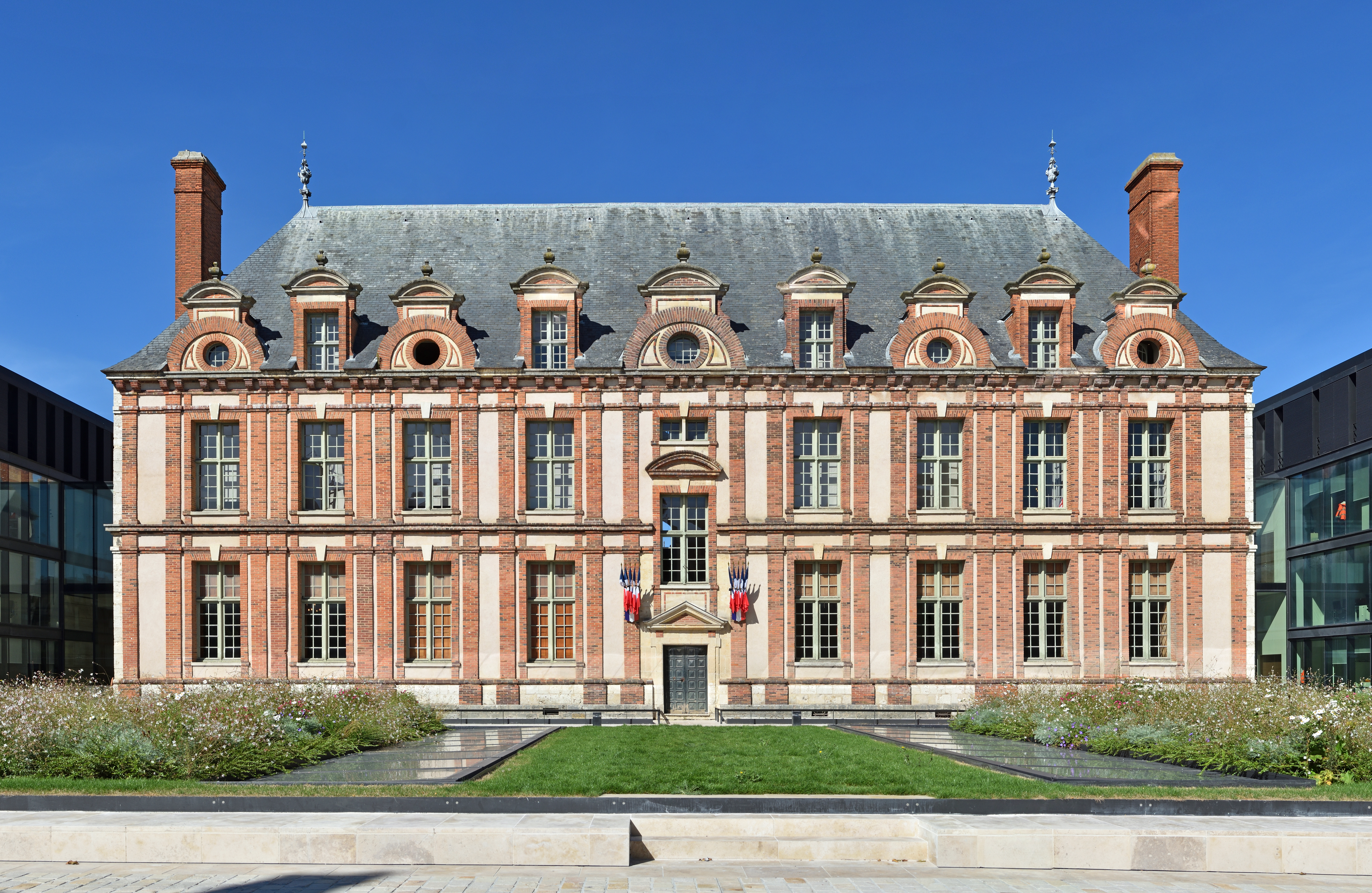
The Hôtel de Ville

The river Eure, which at this point divides into three branches, is crossed by several bridges, some of them ancient, and is fringed in places by remains of the old fortifications, of which the Porte Guillaume (14th century), a gateway flanked by towers, was the most complete specimen, until destroyed by the retreating German army in the night of 15 to 16 August 1944. The steep, narrow streets of the old town contrast with the wide, shady boulevards which encircle it and separate it from the suburbs. The "parc André-Gagnon" or "Clos St. Jean", a pleasant park, lies to the north-west, and squares and open spaces are numerous.

Part of the Hôtel de Ville (City Hall) is a building dating from the 17th century, called Hôtel Montescot. The Maison Canoniale dating back to the 13th century, and several medieval and Renaissance houses, are of interest.

There is a statue of General Marceau (1769–1796), a native of Chartres and a general during the French Revolution.

The Maison Picassiette, a house decorated inside and out with mosaics of shards of broken china and pottery, was built by Raymond Isidore.

== Economy ==
Chartres is one of the most important market towns in the region of Beauce (known as "the granary of France").

Historically, game pies and other delicacies of Chartres were well known, and the industries also included flour-milling, brewing, distilling, iron-founding, leather manufacture, perfumes, dyeing, stained glass, billiard requisites and hosiery.

Since 1976 the fashion and perfumes company Puig has had a production plant in this commune.

=== Transport ===
The Gare de Chartres railway station offers frequent services to Paris, and a few daily connections to Le Mans, Nogent-le-Rotrou and Courtalain. The A11 motorway connects Chartres with Paris and Le Mans.

== Sport ==
Chartres is home to two semi-professional association football clubs; FC Chartres, who play in the French sixth division, and HB Chartres, who play in the seventh tier.

Chartres has a table tennis club which is playing in the Pro A (French First division) and in the European Champions League. The club won the ETTU Cup on the season 2010 – 2011 and it finished at the second position in the French First division.

Chartres has the second most important squash club in France.

There is also a handball club and it is playing in the French second division, C' Chartres Métropole Handball.

In November 2012, Chartres organized the European Short Course Swimming Championships.

== Diocese ==
The town is the seat of a diocese (bishopric), a prefecture, and a cour d'assises. It has a Tribunal de grande instance, a Tribunal d'instance, a Chamber of commerce and a branch of the Banque de France.

Public and religious schooling from kindergarten through high school and vocational schools is given in mixed (boys and girls) establishments. The two main high schools are the Lycée Jehan de Beauce and the Lycée Marceau, named after two important personages of the history of Chartres: Jehan de Beauce was a 16th-century architect who rebuilt the northern steeple of the cathedral after it had been destroyed by lightning in July 1506, and Marceau, a native of city, who was a general during the French Revolution of 1789.

=== Pilgrimages ===
Chartres has been a site of Catholic pilgrimages since the Middle Ages. The poet Charles Péguy (1873–1914) revived the pilgrimage route between Paris and Chartres before World War I. After the war, some students carried on the pilgrimage in his memory. Since 1982, the association Notre-Dame de Chrétienté, with offices in Versailles, organizes the annual 100 km (62 mi) pilgrimage on foot from Notre-Dame de Paris to Notre-Dame de Chartres. About 15,000 pilgrims, from France and countries outside France, participate every year.

=== Bishops ===
Notable bishops of Chartres:

- Fulbert of Chartres (1007–1029)
- St. Ivo of Chartres (1090–1115)
- John of Salisbury (1176–1180)
- Érard de La Marck (1472–1538)

== Notable people ==
Chartres was the birthplace of:

- Hélène Boucher (1908–1934), pilot
- Jacques Pierre Brissot (1754–1793), a leading member of the Girondist movement (French Revolution)
- Julien Cétout (born 1987 or 1988), football player
- Arlette Chabot (born 1951), journalist
- Fulcher of Chartres (born around 1059 in or near Chartres), chronicler of the First Crusade
- Alexis de Castillon (1838–1873), composer
- Philippe de Dangeau (1638–1720), officer and member of the Académie française
- Philippe Desportes (1546–1606), poet
- Antoine François Desrues (1744–1777), poisoner
- Loïc Duval (born 1982), racing driver
- Julien Escudé (born 1979), football player
- Nicolas Escudé (born 1976), tennis player
- André Félibien (1619–1695), architect and historiographer
- Achille Guenée (1809–1880), lawyer and entomologist
- Pierre-Jules Hetzel (1814–1886), editor and publisher
- Éric Lada (born 1965), football player
- Luc Lamirault (born 1962), politician
- François Séverin Marceau-Desgraviers (1769–1796), general
- Pierre Nicole (1625–1695), Jansenist theologian
- Jérôme Pétion de Villeneuve (1756–1794), writer and politician
- Allison Pineau (born 1989), handball player
- André Plassart (1889–1978), hellenist, epigrapher and archaeologist
- Philippe Quintais (born 1967), pétanque player
- Mathurin Régnier (1573–1613), satirist
- Jacqueline de Romilly (1913–2010), philologist, classical scholar and fiction writer
- Benjamin Nivet (born 1977), football player
- Wandrille Lefèvre (born 1989), Canadian football player
- Audrey Marnay (born 1980), actress and model

== International relations ==
Chartres is twinned with:

- Ravenna, Italy (since 1957)
- Speyer, Germany (since 1959)
- Chichester, United Kingdom (since 1959)
- Bethlehem, Palestine (since 1995)
- Évora, Portugal (since 2003)
- León, Spain (since 2009)
- Sakurai, Japan (since 1989)
- Cusco, Peru

== Gallery ==
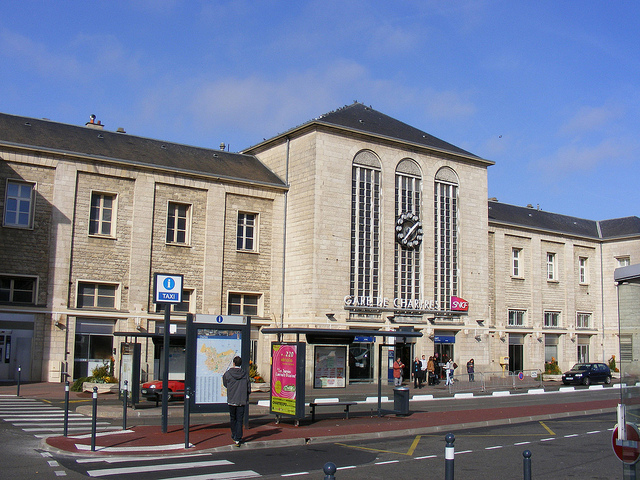
Chartres railway station

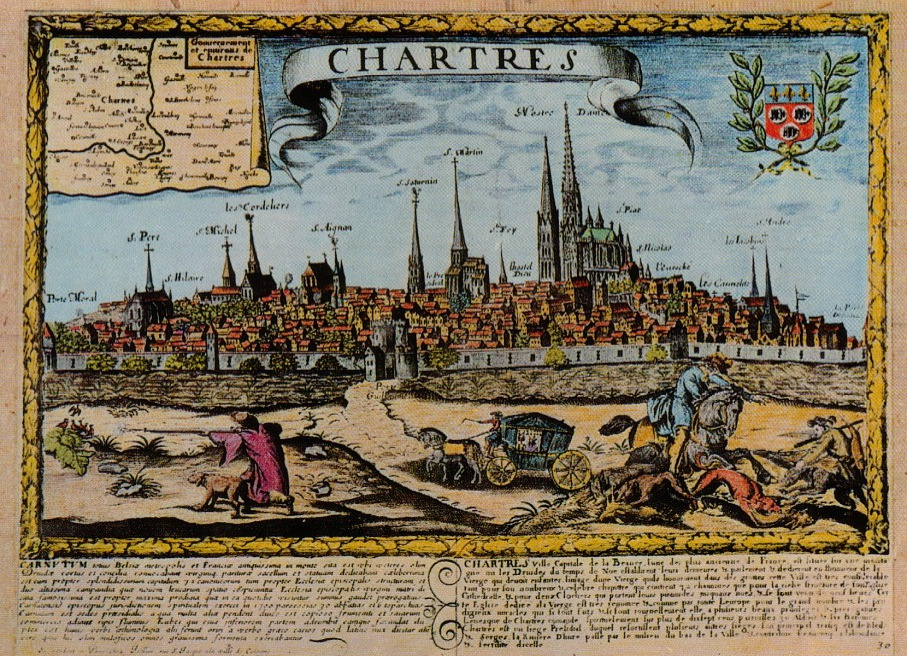
17th-century engraving of Chartres "skyline"

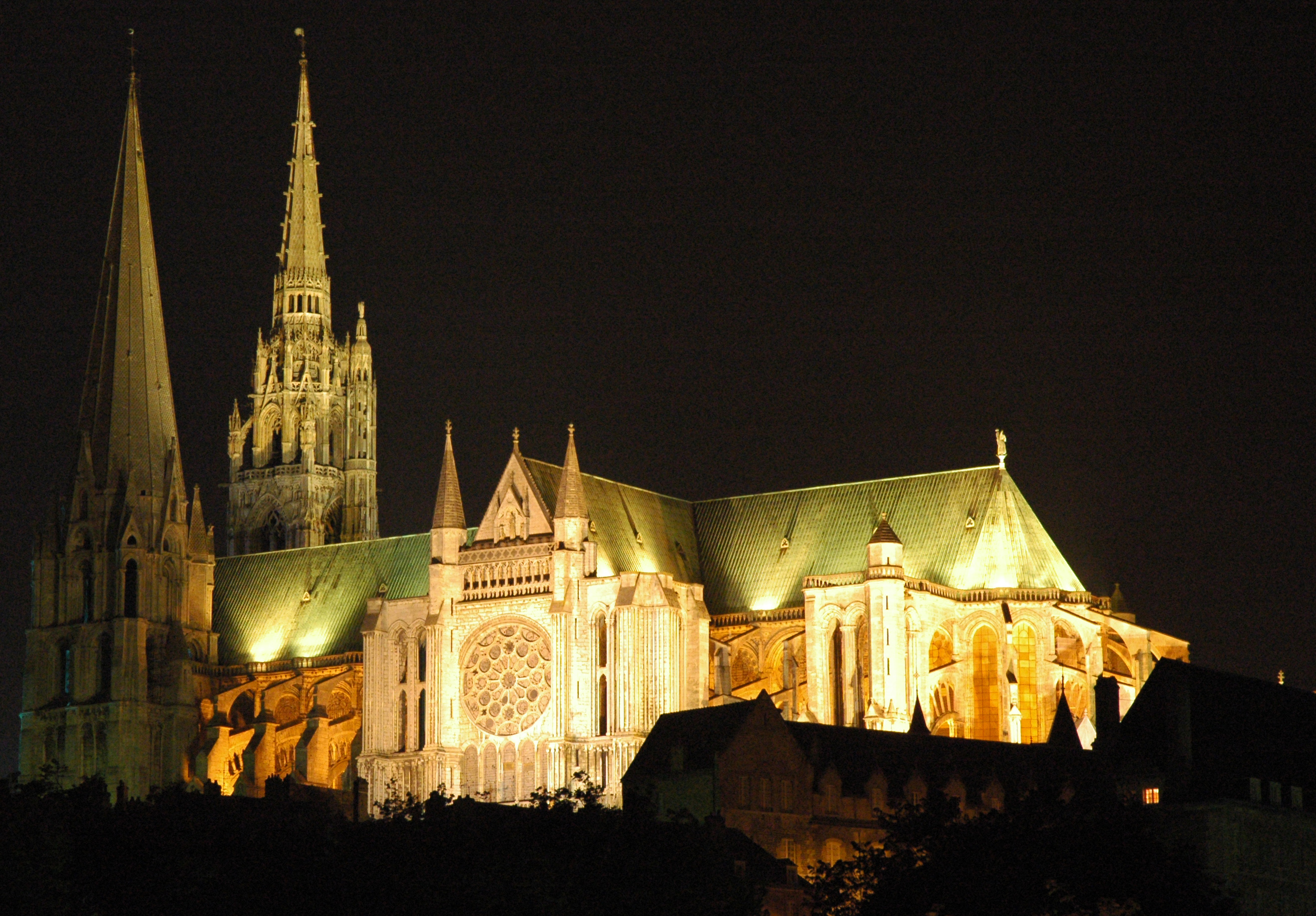
The cathedral of Chartres

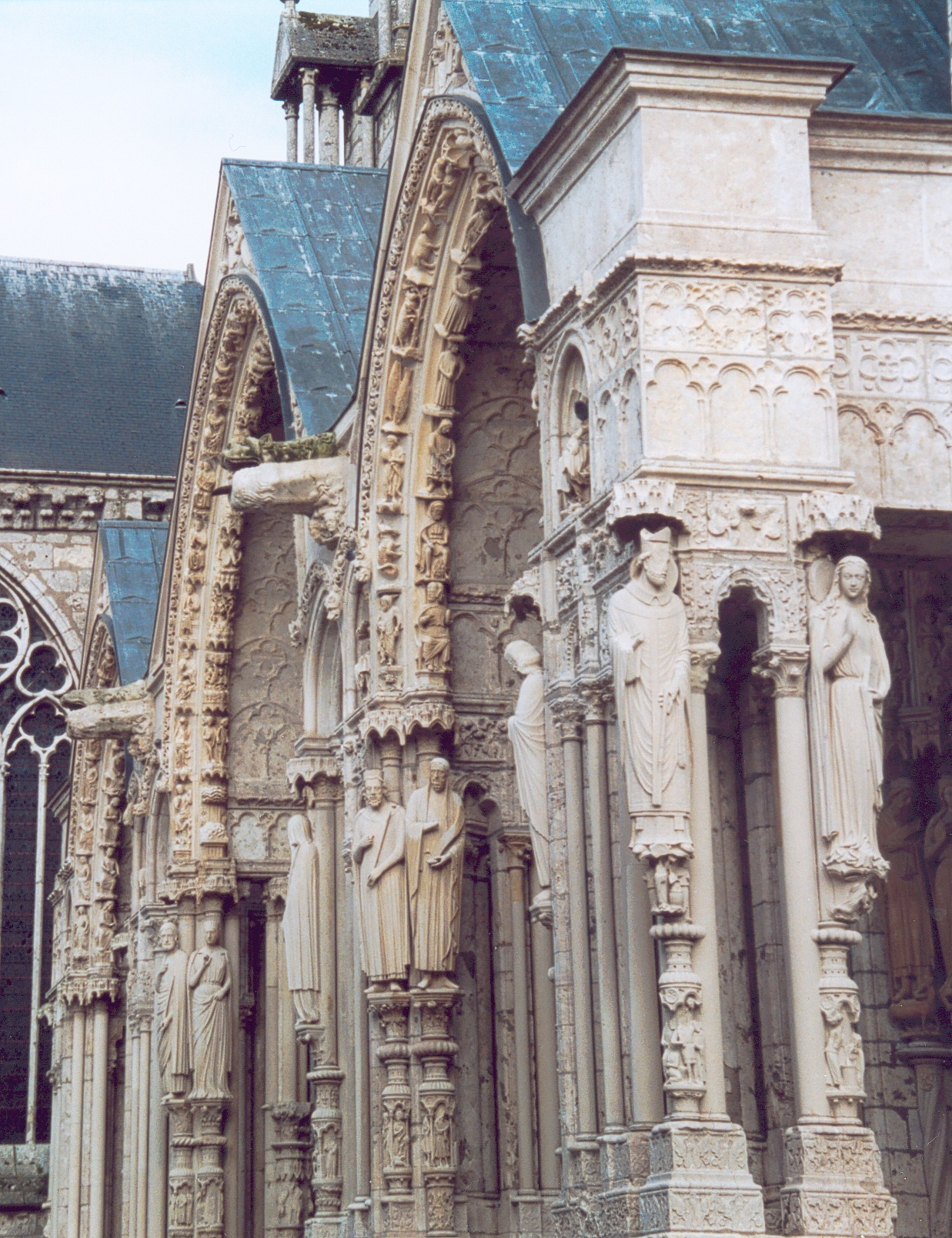
The Apostles and Saint sculptures of Chartres

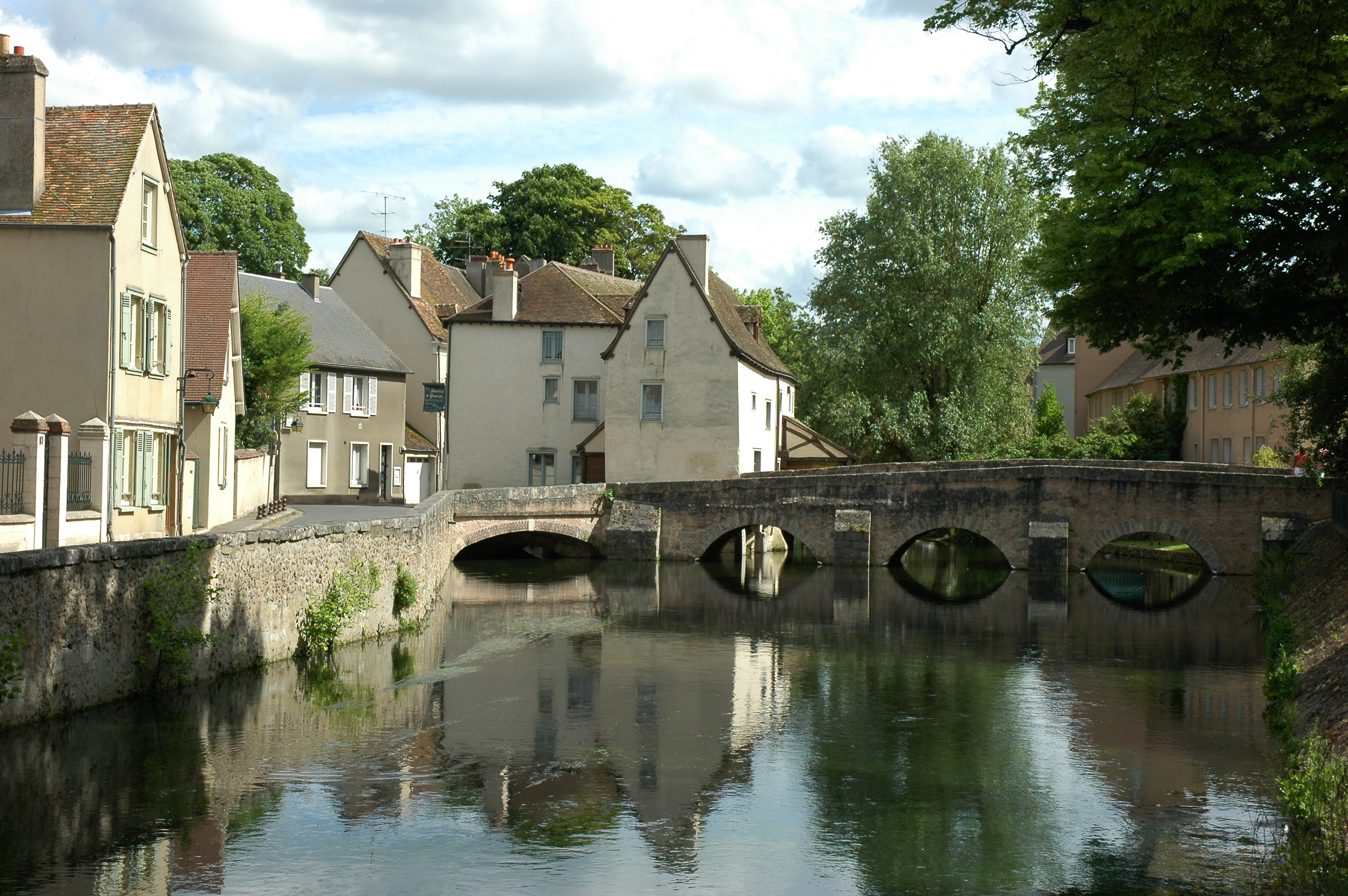
The Old Town – Eure River

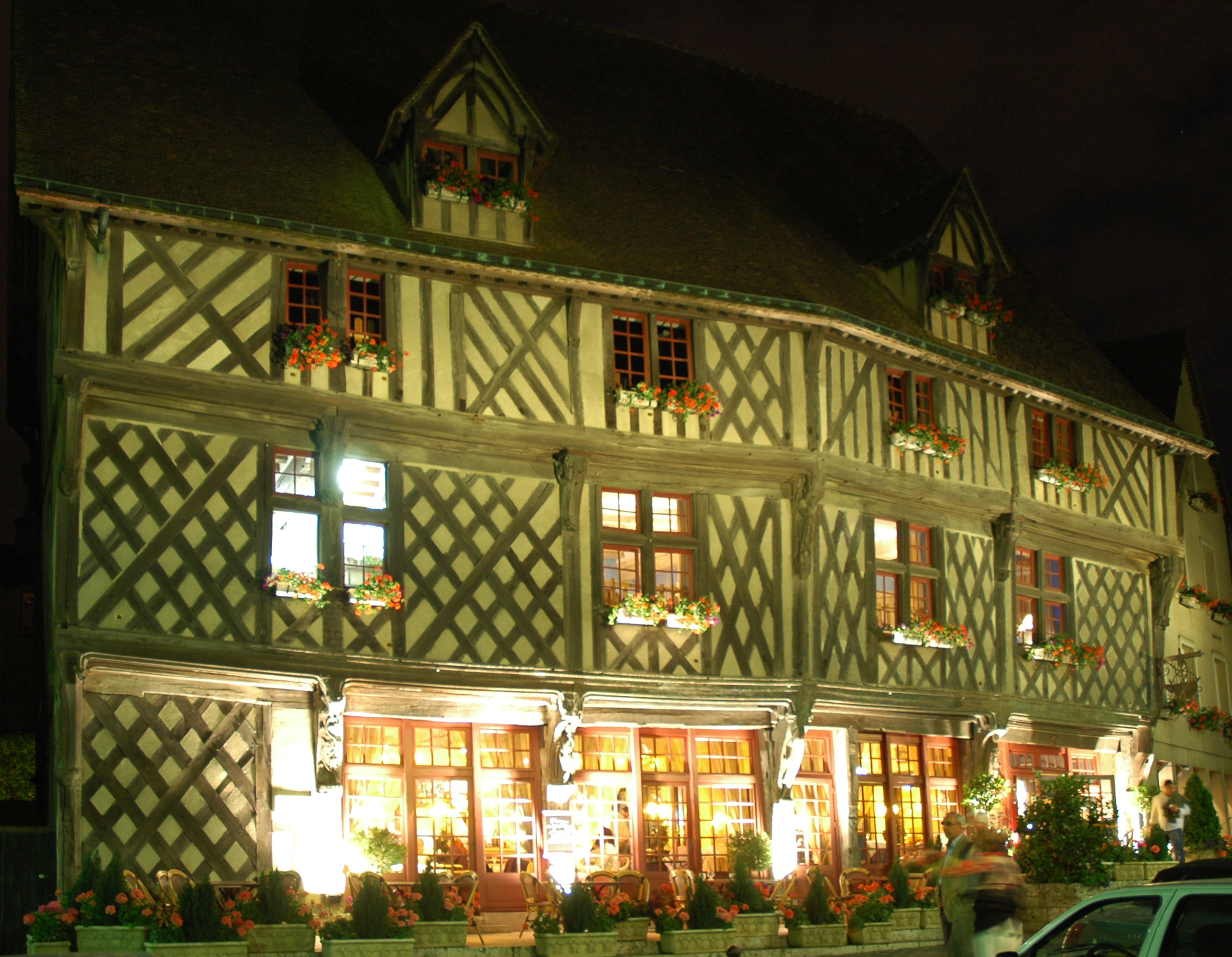
Half-timbered house in the Old Town

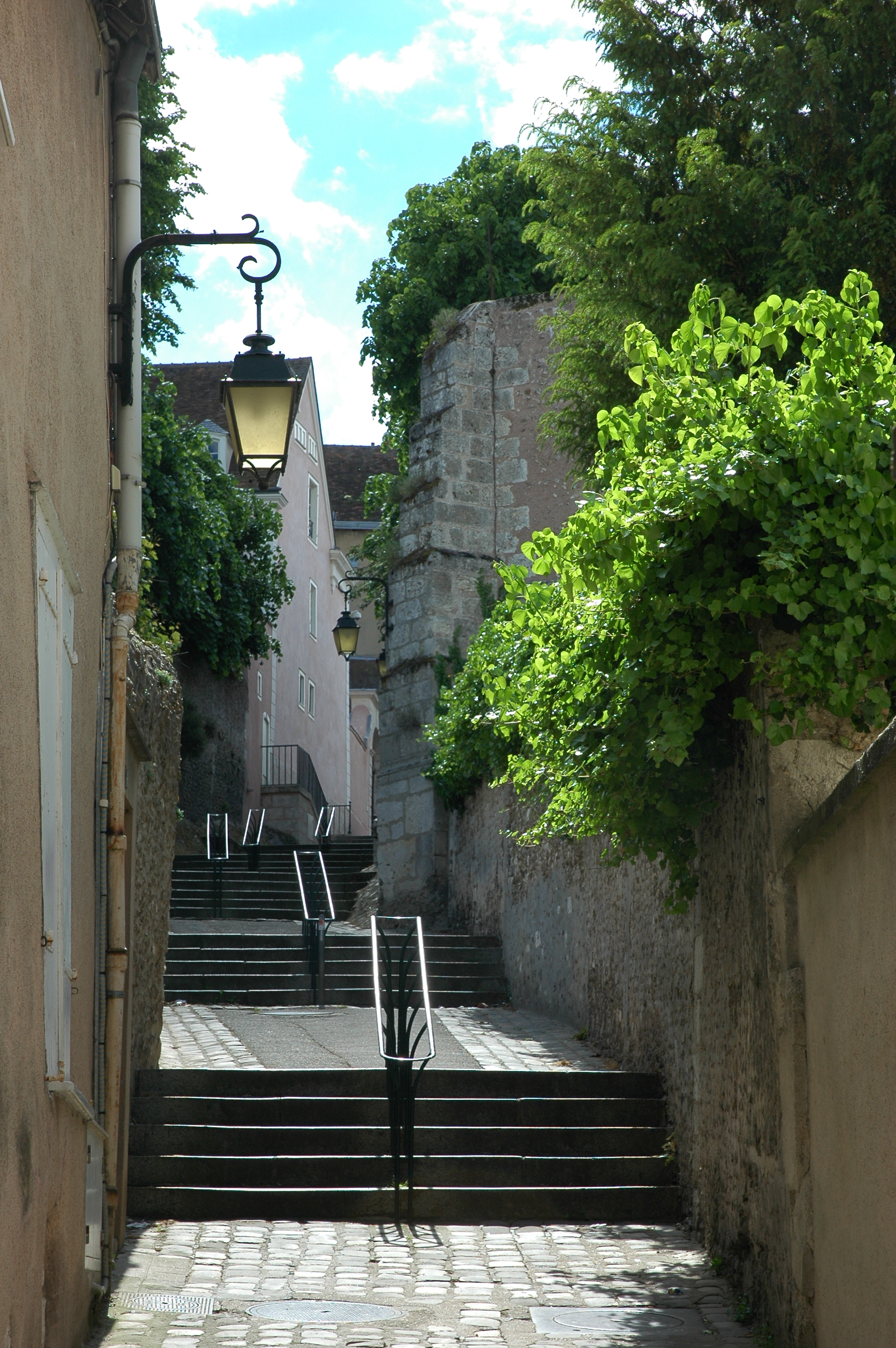
Hill of Saint François

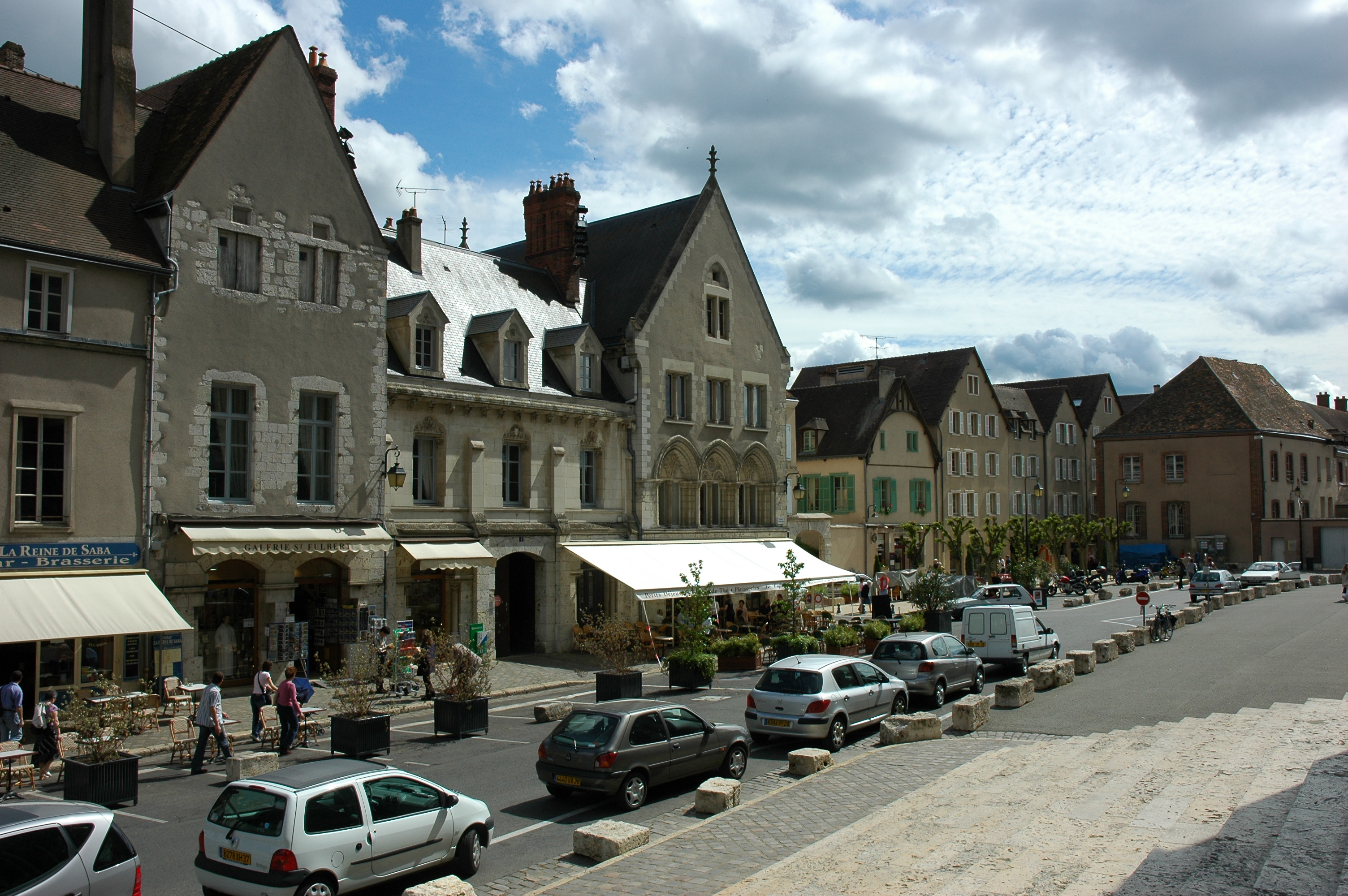
View south from the cathedral

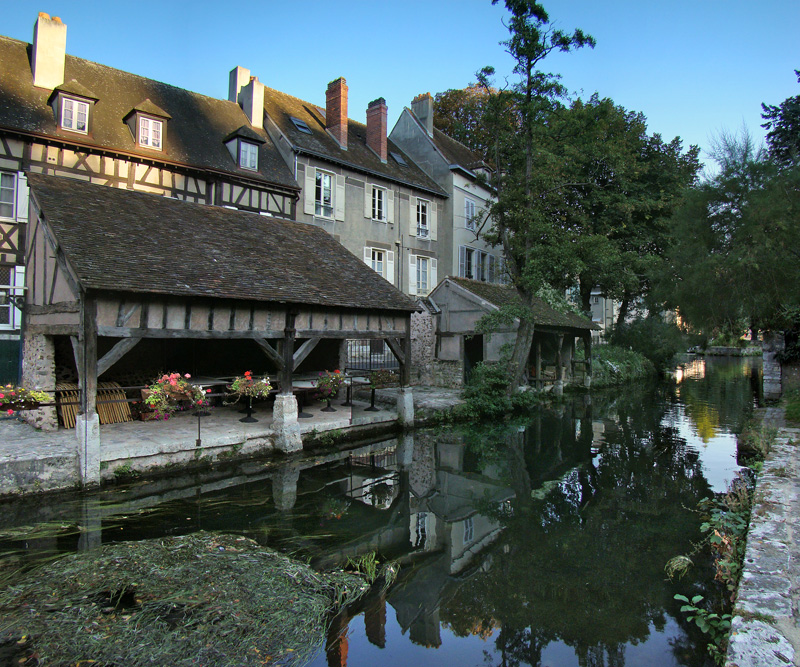
On the banks of the Eure River

== See also ==
- Chartres Cathedral
- Communes of the Eure-et-Loir department
- Chartres - Champhol Aerodrome
