= William Bernard Kelly =

Australian Catholic bishop (1855–1921)

The Most Reverend William Bernard Kelly
- Bishop of Diocese of Geraldton
- Diocese: Geraldton
- Installed: 14 August 1898
- Term ended: 26 December 1921
- Successor: Richard Ryan
- Other post: Vicar Apostolic of Kimberley in Western Australia (1894–1909)

Orders
- Ordination: 24 June 1883 at All Hallows College Chapel, Dublin by Martin Crane
- Consecration: 14 August 1898 at St Francis Xavier's Cathedral, Adelaide by James Francis Corbett

Personal details
- Born: William Bernard Kelly; 7 January 1855 Toodyay, Western Australia, Australia
- Died: 26 December 1921 (aged 66) St John of God Subiaco Hospital, Western Australia, Australia
- Buried: St Francis Xavier's Cathedral, Geraldton
- Denomination: Catholic Church
- Occupation: Catholic bishop
- Education: All Hallows College

William Bernard Kelly (7 January 1855 – 26 December 1921) was an Australian bishop of the Catholic Church. He served as the first Vicar Apostolic of Kimberley in Western Australia and first Bishop of Geraldton.

== Early life ==
Kelly was born at sea, on a boat from Ireland to Australia and raised in Toodyay, Western Australia. He had an early desire to pursue a religious vocation. He initially studied under Archbishop John O'Reily of Perth before being sent to Ireland to study at All Hallows College, Dublin.

== Priesthood ==
On 24 June 1884 Kelly was ordained to the priesthood at All Hallows College, Dublin by Bishop Martin Crane OSA for the Archdiocese of Perth.

He was first appointed to serve at St Mary's Cathedral, Perth and in 1887, became editor of The Record, an office which he only relinquished in 1898. At some point in 1894, he was appointed the first Vicar Apostolic of Kimberley in Western Australia.

== Episcopate ==
On 21 March 1898 he was appointed the first Bishop of Geraldton, which had been established on 30 January 1898. At the time it was believed to be the largest Diocese in the world. He became the first West Australian born priest in the country. He was consecrated at St Francis Xavier's Cathedral, Adelaide on 14 August 1898 by Bishop James Francis Corbett.

He became a prolific builder of the Diocese, constructing 20 churches and 15 schools during his episcopate. He also initiated the construction of the St Francis Xavier Cathedral, Geraldton, which he would also open and be buried in.

== Death ==
Kelly died on 26 December 1921 at St John of God Subiaco Hospital after being in poor health for some years. He was buried in St Francis Xavier Cathedral, Geraldton.

=== Exhumation ===
The exact location of Kelly's final resting place was unknown for almost a century. He had been buried beneath St Francis Xavier Cathedral in Geraldton while it was still under construction and while his final resting place was vaguely described as "behind the throne", no-one recorded where the throne was when it was later removed. The remains were discovered in July 2017 and confirmed to be Kelly's. He was reburied in the Cathedral following renovations, with his grave now properly marked.

Catholic Church titles
Preceded by –	Bishop of Geraldton; 1898–1921	Succeeded by Richard Ryan
Preceded by –	Vicar Apostolic of Kimberley in Western Australia; 1894–1909	Succeeded by John Creagh
