= Michael Morrissey (bishop) =

Australian Roman Catholic bishop

The Most Reverend Michael Morrissey
- Bishop of the Roman Catholic Diocese of Geraldton and Apostolic Administrator of the Roman Catholic Diocese of Broome
- Diocese: Geraldton
- Appointed: 15 May 2017
- Installed: 28 June 2017
- Predecessor: Justin Joseph Bianchini

Orders
- Ordination: 31 January 1981 by Bishop Francis Xavier Thomas
- Consecration: 28 June 2017 by Archbishop Timothy Costelloe

Personal details
- Born: Michael Henry Morrissey; 9 September 1952 (age 74) Geraldton, Australia
- Denomination: Roman Catholic
- Education: St Charles Seminary, Guildford St Francis Xavier Seminary, Adelaide
- Motto: Trust in the Lord

Styles of Michael Morrissey
- Reference style: The Most Reverend
- Spoken style: My Lord
- Religious style: Bishop

Michael Henry Morrissey (9 September 1952) is the bishop of the Roman Catholic Diocese of Geraldton and the Apostolic Administrator of the Roman Catholic Diocese of Broome.

He was previously the vicar general of the Diocese of Geraldton. He was consecrated by Archbishop Timothy Costelloe at Nagle Catholic College on 28 June 2017.

== Early life ==
Michael Morrissey was born at St John of God Hospital, Geraldton, on 9 September 1952. He was the second of five children and grew up on the Noongall Sheep Station, in Yalgoo, near Geraldton, which his family had purchased in 1930. The house on the property is believed to have been designed by priest and architect Monsignor John Hawes, who designed many churches and other buildings across Western Australia, including St Francis Xavier's Cathedral, Geraldton, where Morrissey has his official seat.

He received his primary education via School of the Air lessons under the supervision of his mother, Margaret Morrissey, along with his brother and sister. His mother recalled Morrissey enjoyed going to mass as a child and often rounded up the local children for the once a fortnight masses at a church 30 kilometres from Yalgoo where priests would come from Mullewa or Mt Magnet.

His secondary education was at Aquinas College, in Perth, where he was a boarder for seven years. Morrissey was a natural athlete and swimmer and was put in charge of organising the swimming carnival by the brothers at the college. He graduated from the college in 1969. His mother later recounted he was born to be a priest, saying: “I think it was his nature. Some people are born to be certain things, and, Michael was born to be a priest.”

He continued his studies at St Charles Seminary in Perth and before moving to the St Francis Xavier Seminary in Adelaide, South Australia.

== Priesthood ==
Morrissey was ordained priest on 31 January 1981 at St Francis Xavier's Cathedral, Geraldton by Bishop Francis Xavier Thomas and was appointed as an assistant priest in parishes of Bluff Point and Port Hedland. In 1985, he became parish priest of Karratha in the Pilbara region of Western Australia, serving workers in the booming iron ore industry in the area. In 1992, he was called back to Geraldton to become the administrator of St Francis Xavier's Cathedral, a position he would hold until 2007. He then served as parish priest of Mullewa until 2014, when he was once again made administrator of St Francis Xavier's Cathedral.

In 1994, he was appointed at the Chancellor of the Diocese, alongside his role as cathedral administrator. He was appointed Vicar General of the Diocese in 2007 and served in both roles until he was appointed bishop in 2017.

== Army chaplain ==
In addition to his Diocesan roles, Morrissey served as an army chaplain from 1983 until 2016, achieving the rank of lieutenant colonel. He was deployed to the Middle East during this period and became the Senior Chaplain of Army's Reserve Second Division. He retired as an army chaplain to focus on his increasing responsibilities in the Diocese of Geraldton.

== Episcopacy ==
Morrissey was appointed on 15 May 2017 to be the new Bishop of Geraldton, replacing the retiring Bishop Justin Joseph Bianchini. His episcopal ordination was celebrated 28 June 2017, at the Nagle Catholic College gymnasium, in Geraldton, due to St Francis Xavier's Cathedral being closed for interior renovations. He is the first Bishop of Geraldton to be born, raised, ordained and ministered in the Diocese. The Diocese of Geraldton is the largest diocese by land size in Australia and one of the largest in the world, with a total land mass of more than a million square kilometres.

On 1 September 2021, Morrissey announced he had been appointed by Pope Francis to be the apostolic administrator of the neighbouring Diocese of Broome, following the resignation of Bishop Christopher Saunders on 28 August 2021.

Catholic Church titles
Preceded by Justin Joseph Bianchini	Bishop of Geraldton; 2017–present	Incumbent
