= Christopher Saunders =

Australian Catholic prelate

The Most Reverend Christopher Saunders
- Bishop of Broome
- Church: Catholic Church; Latin Church
- Diocese: Broome
- Appointed: 3 November 1995
- Term ended: 21 August 2021
- Predecessor: John Jobst
- Successor: Tim Norton
- Other post: Bishop emeritus of Broome (2021‍–‍present)

Orders
- Ordination: 28 August 1976 by John Jobst
- Consecration: 8 February 1996 by John Jobst, Justin Bianchini, Edmund Collins

Personal details
- Born: Melbourne, Victoria, Australia
- Education: Saint Paul University
- Coat of arms

Christopher Saunders is an Australian prelate of the Catholic Church who was the bishop of the Latin Church diocese of Broome from 1996 to 2021, when he resigned amid allegations of sexual misconduct.

On 21 February 2024, Saunders was charged with rape and other sex offences, after a long-running investigation by Australian police. In August 2026, he was convicted of sexual offences against two men. He was taken into custody and in October 2026 was sentenced to more than six years' jail in the Perth District Court.

== Early life and education ==
Christopher Saunders studied at St Bede's College in Mentone, Victoria, and then studied philosophy for three years with the Columban Fathers.

Having developed an interest in Aboriginal affairs, he was accepted by the Diocese of Broome and continued his studies in theology at St Francis Xavier Seminary in Adelaide, South Australia.

== Career ==
Saunders worked as a deacon in Broome, Northern Territory, in 1975 and was ordained a priest of that diocese in 1976.

His assignments took him to La Grange Mission (1976–1978), Lombadina Mission (1978–1982) and Kalumburu Mission (1982–1988). From 1989 to 1995 he was administrator of Broome, interrupted by two years of study for a licentiate in canon law at Saint Paul's Pontifical University in Ottawa, Canada.

Saunders was named bishop of Broome on 3 November 1995, and consecrated a bishop on 8 February 1996. He was ordained by John Jobst and consecrated John Jobst, Justin Bianchini, and Edmund Collins.

== Sex offences ==
=== Reports and resignation (2018–2021) ===
The initial complaint of sexual abuse was filed in 2018, but no charges were laid at that time. A journalistic investigation was aired about the alleged sex offences and financial misconduct in 2020.

On 9 March 2020, Saunders voluntarily stood aside from the administration of the diocese after the Vatican ordered a review of the diocese. Church authorities did not indicate any connection between that investigation and the news that Western Australian Police had been investigating an allegation of sexual misconduct made against him 18 months earlier.

Peter Ingham, Bishop emeritus of Wollongong, was tasked with the church's investigation into Saunders' management, including financial affairs and handling allegations of sexual misconduct by priests. The church had received complaints about Saunders as early as April 2019 and tried to evaluate them while preventing their repetition and without alerting Saunders. On 27 November 2020, Saunders agreed to take six-months' leave "outside the Diocese", where his continued performance in public as a priest provoked complaints.

In May 2021, government officials decided not to file criminal charges. Pope Francis accepted his resignation as Bishop of Broome on 28 August 2021.

=== Vatican inquiry (2022–2023) ===
The Vatican ordered a Vos estis lux mundi inquiry into the allegations, it was started in September 2022 and concluded in April 2023. The report was leaked and concluded that Saunders likely sexually assaulted four youths while potentially grooming another 67.

=== Investigation and arrests (2023–2025) ===
In October 2023, the WA Police commenced a new investigation into Saunders, codenamed "Operation STENT".

On 15 January 2024, Saunders was arrested in Leschenault, a suburb south of Perth near the town of Bunbury. He was interviewed by Police at the Midland Police Station, but released without charge later that night.

While he was in custody in Perth, secret police teams installed hidden cameras and microphones in his car in Perth, as well as in his car and home in Broome. These secret recordings showing his interactions with young Aboriginal men were played at his trial.

Saunders was arrested a total of six times during the Operation STENT investigation: the first being 15 January 2024; the second on 21 February 2024, where he was charged with 19 sex offences, including rape, with some of the charges for acts he was alleged to have committed against children; again on 17 April 2024, where he was charged with two sex offences; again on 26 November 2024, where he was charged with several sex offences. He was arrested again on 26 January 2025, where he was charged with several sex offences, including the rape of a child under 13 years old; and the sixth and final arrest occurred on 4 June 2025, where he was released without charge.

=== Trial and sentencing (2026) ===
The trial began in the Perth District Court on 21 July 2026. On the first day the charges relating to the sex offences against a child under 13 years old were discontinued. On 13 August 2026, after a trial lasting more than three weeks, Saunders was found of guilty one count of sexual penetration and 12 counts of indecent assault. He was found not guilty of six other charges put before the Judge. The lead investigator, Detective Sergeant Andrew Broadley of the Western Australia Police Child Sex Abuse Squad, spoke to the media after the guilty verdicts to acknowledge the victims and witnesses "who showed tremendous courage in coming forward, engaging with Police and taking part in the investigative process and ultimately the prosecution".

Saunders appeared in the Perth District Court on 21 September 2026, for a sentencing hearing. On that same day, the Perth District Court released the Police covert surveillance recordings showing Saunders grooming a young aboriginal man in his Broome home in early 2024.

On 7 October 2026, Saunders was sentenced to a jail term of six and a half years in the Perth District Court.

He retains the title of "bishop emeritus", an honorary title retained for life. The only way this may be removed is by the Holy See removing it, in a process known as "defrocking". He also retains a retirement deal which negotiated in 2021.
