= Richard Ryan (bishop) =

Australian Catholic bishop (1881–1957)

The Most Reverend Richard Ryan CM
- Bishop of Diocese of Sale
- Diocese: Sale
- Installed: 10 March 1926
- Term ended: 16 June 1957
- Other post: Bishop of Geraldton (1923–1926)

Orders
- Ordination: 25 May 1907 by William Joseph Walsh
- Consecration: 29 July 1923 at St Joseph's Church, Malvern by Daniel Mannix

Personal details
- Born: Richard Ryan; 25 July 1881 Liverpool, United Kingdom
- Died: 16 June 1957 (aged 75) Melbourne, Victoria, Australia
- Denomination: Catholic Church
- Occupation: Catholic bishop
- Motto: Evangelizare Pauperibus Misit Me (He sent me to evangelise the poor)

Richard Ryan CM (25 July 1881 – 16 June 1957) was an English-born Australian bishop of the Catholic Church. He served as Bishop of Geraldton and then Bishop of Sale until his death.

== Early life ==
Ryan was born in Liverpool, England, the son of James and Margaret Ryan. He received his education at St Patrick's Grammar School, Armagh and completed his secondary education at Castleknock College, run by the Congregation of the Mission, known as the Vincentians. He joined the order on 13 September 1901 and took his vows on 14 September 1903.

== Priesthood ==
On 25 May 1907, he was ordained a priest by Archbishop William Joseph Walsh.

He came to Australia shortly after his ordination and lived at the House of Missions in Ashfield, Sydney for more than a dozen years. He was appointed Superior of the order in 1919, moving to Malvern and taking charge of St Joseph's Church. He transformed the church, adding aesthetic decorations, erecting new Stations of the Cross, two side chapels and a nuns' chapel. Following the renovations, it was regarded as one of the most beautiful churches in Greater Melbourne.

== Episcopate ==
On 30 January 1923, Ryan was appointed Bishop of Geraldton by Pope Pius XI. He was the second person to hold this office and he was consecrated a bishop on 29 July 1923 at St Joseph's Church, Malvern by Archbishop Daniel Mannix. He was installed on 5 October 1923 at St Francis Xavier's Cathedral, Geraldton by Archbishop Patrick Joseph Clune of Perth.

=== Bishop of Sale ===
His time in Geraldton was short-lived and just over two years after being installed, he was appointed Bishop of Sale on 10 March 1926. He served as Bishop of Sale for almost 30 years.

One of his first priorities as Bishop was completing renovation work on St Mary's Cathedral, Sale. The altar was reconstructed and sanctuary remodelled.

He was appointed Assistant Bishop at the Papal Throne and Count of the Holy Roman Empire by Pope Pius XII on 29 July 1948.

== Death ==
Ryan died in hospital in Melbourne on 16 June 1957, while still Bishop of Sale. He had celebrated his golden jubilee of ordination just two weeks prior. He was buried in the crypt at Our Lady’s Chapel in St Mary’s Cathedral, Sale.

Catholic Church titles
Preceded by Patrick Phelan	Bishop of Sale; 1926–1957	Succeeded by Patrick Francis Lyons
Preceded by William Bernard Kelly	Bishop of Geraldton; 1923–1926	Succeeded by James Patrick O'Collins
