= Patrick Lyons =

Australian prelate

- 4th Bishop of Sale
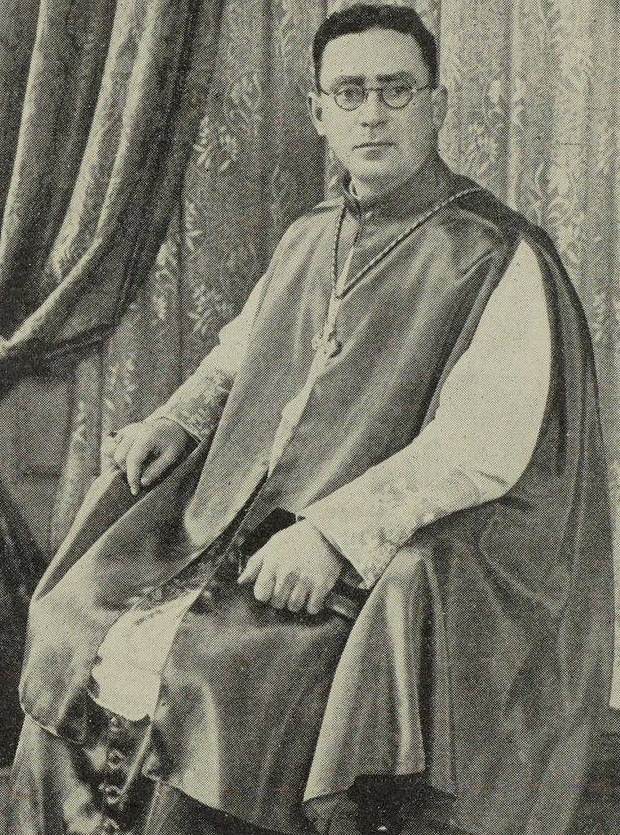
- Bishop Lyons in July 1944
- Diocese: Roman Catholic Diocese of Sale
- Installed: 16 June 1957
- Term ended: 13 August 1967
- Predecessor: Richard Ryan C.M.
- Successor: Arthur Fox
- Previous post: 3rd Bishop of Christchurch (1944–1950) Auxiliary Bishop of Sydney (1950–1957) Coadjutor Bishop of Sale (1956–1957)

Personal details
- Born: 6 January 1903 North Melbourne, Melbourne, Victoria, Australia
- Died: 13 August 1967 (aged 64) East Melbourne, Melbourne, Victoria, Australia
- Buried: St. Mary's Cathedral, Sale, Victoria
- Occupation: Roman Catholic bishop
- Profession: Cleric

Styles of Patrick Lyons
- Reference style: The Most Reverend
- Spoken style: Your Excellency
- Religious style: Bishop

Patrick Lyons (6 January 1903 – 13 August 1967) was an Australian prelate of the Catholic Church. He was the third Bishop of Christchurch, New Zealand (1944–1950), Auxiliary Bishop of Sydney, New South Wales, Australia (1950–1957) and fourth Bishop of Sale, Victoria, Australia (1957–1967).

== Early life ==
Patrick Francis Lyons was born in North Melbourne, as the second child of Patrick Joseph Lyons and his Irish-born wife Catherine Cecilia McMahon. He studied at St Mary's Primary School, West Melbourne and later at St. Joseph's CBC North Melbourne, run by the Christian Brothers, where he attained his Leaving Certificate. After matriculating from St Kevin's College, Melbourne, he became a clerk in the Department of the Navy in 1918. He resigned four years later to pursue an ecclesiastical career. He attended St. Columba's College, St. Patrick's College, Melbourne and then entered the Pontifical Urbaniana University in 1923.

== Priesthood ==
Lyons was ordained to the priesthood in Rome by Willem Cardinal van Rossum, CSSR, on his twenty-fourth birthday, 6 January 1927. After obtaining his doctorate in divinity in June of that same year, Lyons returned to Australia and then did pastoral work in Collingwood, Geelong, and Brunswick before joining the staff of St. Patrick's Cathedral in 1935. In 1938, he became administrator of the cathedral, archdiocesan chancellor, and private secretary to Archbishop Mannix. Lyons was named vicar general of Melbourne in 1939. During that same year, he established St. Patrick's Boys' Choir and choir school, incorporating members of the Vienna Boys' Choir displaced following the outbreak of World War II. In 1940, he was appointed cavaliere della Corona d'Italia in recognition of his services to the Italian community in Victoria.

== Bishop of Christchurch ==
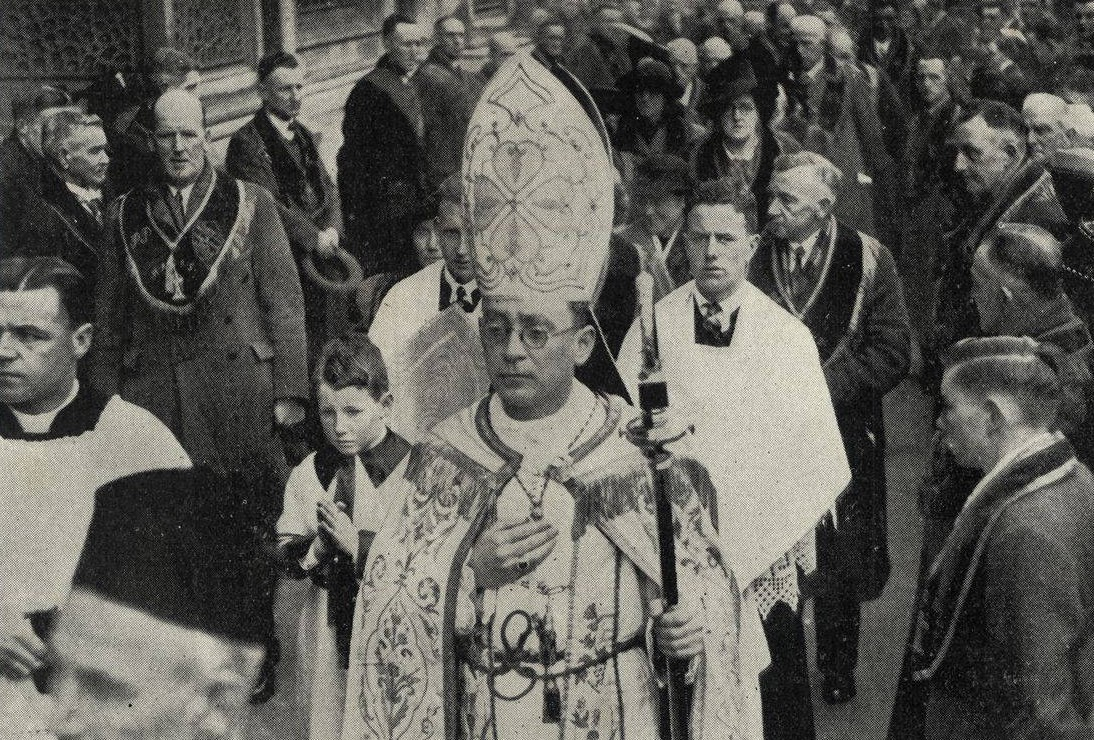
Bishop Lyon in procession at the Cathedral of the Blessed Sacrament for his enthronement (August 1944)

On 16 March 1944, Lyons was appointed the third Bishop of Christchurch, New Zealand, by Pope Pius XII. He received his episcopal consecration on the following 2 July from Archbishop Mannix, with Bishop Hugh O'Neill (Coadjutor Bishop of Dunedin) and Archbishop Matthew Beovich of Adelaide serving as co-consecrators, in St. Patrick's Cathedral, Melbourne. Lyons was then enthroned on 6 August 1944. Lyons was Bishop of Christchurch for six years. One notable achievement during that time was the founding of Holy Name Seminary in Christchurch. The establishment of this seminary, and the invitation to the Jesuits to staff it, was largely on the initiative of Lyons (with the important support of Bishop Liston of Auckland). Lyons also purchased the land in West Christchurch for St Thomas of Canterbury College (which was built some years later) and invited the Christian Brothers to staff it.

== Auxiliary Bishop of Sydney ==
Lyons returned to Australia upon being named Auxiliary Bishop of Sydney and Titular Bishop of Cabasa on 5 April 1950. He served as the episcopal leader of the Catholic Social Studies Movement, the secret Catholic anti-communist group in the trade unions and Australian Labor Party, in Sydney until 1954, during which time he incurred heavy resentment for dismissing Fr. Patrick Ryan, CSSM, as chaplain.

== Bishop of Sale ==
Lyons was made Coadjutor Bishop of Sale on 11 October 1956, and in 1957 succeeded Richard Ryan, CM, as the fourth Bishop of Sale on 16 June 1957. During his tenure, Lyons oversaw the expansion of his diocese, adding several new parishes. Considered conservative, authoritarian and aloof, he attended the Second Vatican Council from 1962 to 1965 and remained cautious towards the implementation of the council's reforms.

== Death ==
The Bishop died from cancer in East Melbourne, aged 64, and was interred in St. Mary's Cathedral in Sale.

== Arms ==
Coat of arms of Patrick Lyons

Escutcheon
Gules on rocks a lighthouse Argent.
Motto
Evangelizare Pauperibus Misit Me

Catholic Church titles
Preceded by Matthew Joseph Brodie	Bishop of Christchurch; 1944–1950	Succeeded by Edward Joyce
Preceded by N/A	Auxiliary Bishop of Sydney; 1950–1956	Succeeded by N/A
Preceded by N/A	Coadjutor Bishop of Sale; 1956	Succeeded by N/A
Preceded by Richard Ryan, CM	Bishop of Sale; 1957–1967	Succeeded by Arthur Francis Fox
