= Raible =

Raible is a surname. Notable people with the surname include:

- Alton Raible (1918–2016), American painter, printmaker, and book illustrator
- Otto Raible (1887–1966), German-born Australian Catholic bishop
- Steve Raible (born 1954), American football radio broadcaster
