= Diocese of Geraldton =

Catholic ecclesiastical territory

Diocese of Geraldton Dioecesis di Geraldton
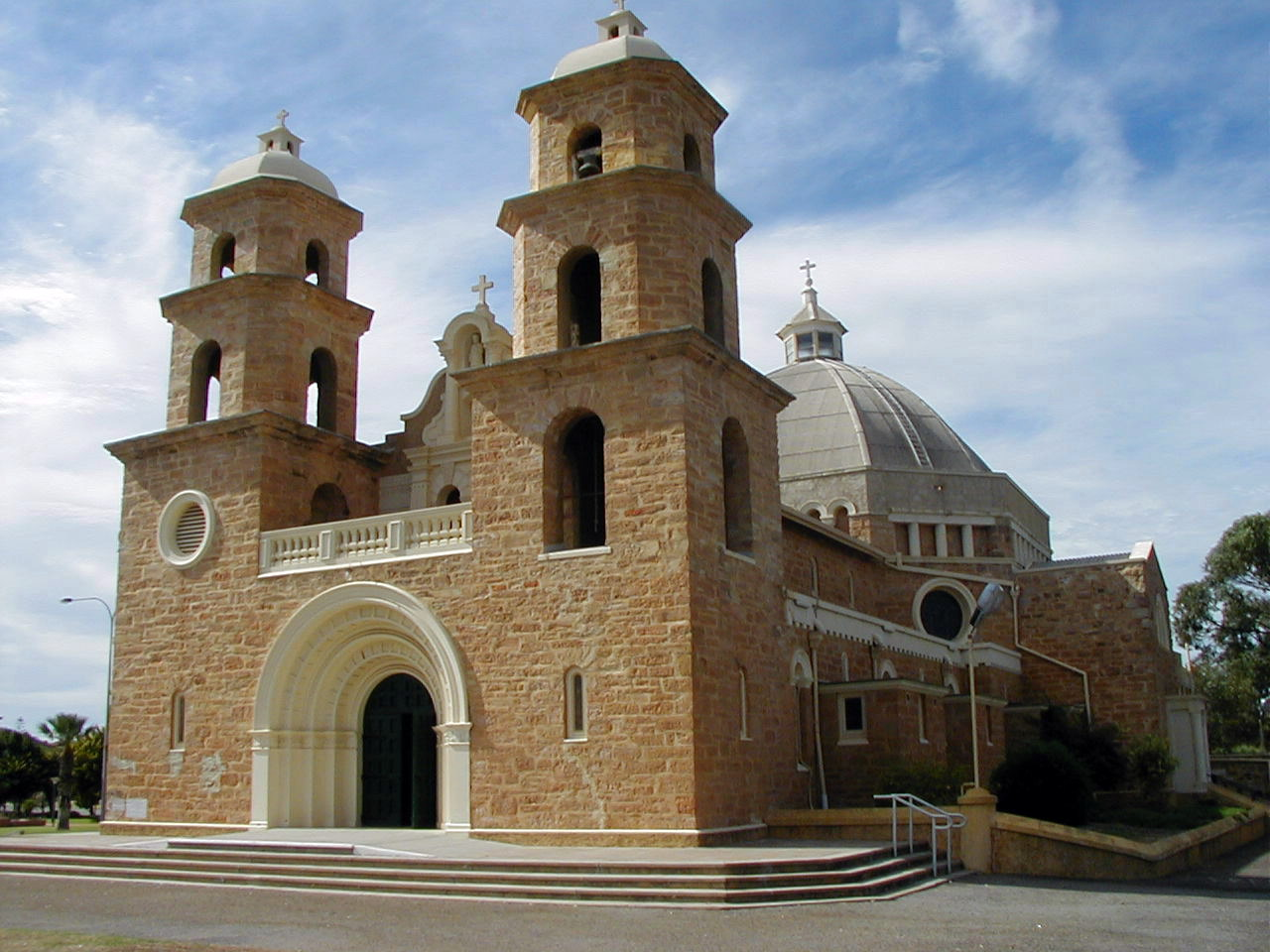
- St Francis Xavier Cathedral, Geraldton

Location
- Country: Australia
- Territory: Mid West, Western Australia
- Ecclesiastical province: Province of Perth
- Metropolitan: Perth
- Coordinates: 28°46′38″S 114°36′50″E

Statistics
- Area: 1,318,310 km^{2} (509,000 sq mi)
- Population: Total; Catholics: (as of 2006); ▼114,662; ▲27,135 (▲23.7%)
- Parishes: 12

Information
- Denomination: Catholic Church
- Sui iuris church: Latin Church
- Rite: Roman Rite
- Established: 30 January 1898
- Cathedral: St Francis Xavier's Cathedral, Geraldton

Current leadership
- Pope: Leo XIV
- Bishop: Michael Henry Morrissey
- Metropolitan Archbishop: Timothy Costelloe
- Bishops emeritus: Justin Joseph Bianchini

Website
- Catholic Diocese of Geraldton

The Roman Catholic Diocese of Geraldton is a Latin Church ecclesiastical jurisdiction or diocese of the Catholic Church covering the Mid West, Western Australia. It is a suffragan diocese in the ecclesiastical province of the Metropolitan Archdiocese of Perth.

Its cathedral episcopal see is St Francis Xavier Cathedral, in Geraldton.

== History ==
Established on 30 January 1898 as Diocese of Geraldton / Geraldtonen(sis) (Latin), on territory split off from the then Diocese of Perth (now its Metropolitan).

== Statistics ==
As of 2014, it pastorally served 29,700 Catholics (23.1% of 128,800 total) on 131,831 km² in 16 parishes and 24 missions with 18 priests (12 diocesan, 6 religious), 35 lay religious (10 brothers, 25 sisters), 3 seminarians.

=== Parishes ===
The diocese has fifteen parishes with regular liturgical services held in the following locations, with churches dedicated to particular saints:

- Geraldton (Cathedral of St Francis Xavier), Greenough (St Peter), and Rangeway (St John)
- Bluff Point (St Lawrence) and Wonthella (St Patrick)
- Carnarvon (St Mary Star of the Sea) and Exmouth (St John)
- Dongara (Our Lady Star of the Sea) and Leeman (Mary Queen of Peace)
- Karratha (St Paul), Dampier (St Peter), and Wickham (Our Lady of the Pilbara)
- Leonora (Sacred Heart), Laverton (Christ the Redeemer), and Leinster
- Morawa (Holy Cross)
- Mt Magnet (St Brigid), Meekatharra (Christ the King), and Cue (St Patrick)
- Mullewa (Our Lady of Mt Carmel) and Mingenew (St Joseph)
- Newman (St Joseph)
- Northampton (Our Lady in Ara Coeli), Kalbarri (Our Lady Help of Christians), and Nanson (Our Lady of Fatima)
- Port Hedland (St Cecilia)
- South Hedland (St John the Baptist)
- Three Springs (St Paul), Perenjori (St Joseph), Coorow (Our Lady Queen of Peace), and Carnamah (St Andrew)
- Tom Price (St Thomas) and Paraburdoo (St Theresa)

== Bishops ==
=== Episcopal ordinaries ===
The following individuals have been elected as Bishops of Geraldton:

Order	Name	Date enthroned	Reign ended	Term of office	Reason for term end
1	William Bernard Kelly †	21 March 1898	26 December 1921	23 years, 280 days	Died in office
2	Richard Ryan, Congregation of the Mission (C.M.)	30 January 1923, previously Apostolic Vicar of Kimberley in Western Australia (1894–1909)	10 March 1926	3 years, 39 days	Appointed Bishop of Sale (Australia) (10 March 1926 – 16 June 1957)
3	James Patrick O'Collins †	11 February 1930	23 December 1941	11 years, 315 days	Appointed Bishop of Ballarat (Australia) (23 December 1941 – 1 May 1975)
4	Alfred Gummer †	24 February 1942	5 April 1962	20 years, 40 days	Died in office
5	Francis Xavier Thomas †	18 June 1962	31 July 1981	19 years, 43 days	Retired as Bishop Emeritus of Geraldton
6	William Foley †	13 July 1981	26 October 1983	2 years, 105 days	Elevated as Metropolitan Archbishop of Perth (26 October 1983 – 10 February 1991)
7	Barry Hickey	22 March 1984	23 July 1991	7 years, 123 days	Elevated as Metropolitan Archbishop of Perth (23 July 1991 – 20 February 2020), also Vice-President of Australian Catholic Bishops Conference (5 May 2006 – 4 May 2012)
8	Justin Joseph Bianchini	25 March 1992	15 May 2017	34 years, 41 days	Retired as Bishop Emeritus of Geraldton
9	Michael Morrissey	15 May 2017	incumbent	8 years, 355 days	

=== Other priest of this diocese who became bishop ===
- Bryan Gallagher †, appointed Bishop of Port Pirie in 1952

== Catholic Education ==
Crest	School	Location	Details
	St Francis Xavier Catholic Primary School	Geraldton	Primary K–6
	St Lawrence's School	Bluff Point	Primary K–6
	St John's School	Rangeway	Primary K–7
	St Paul's School	Karratha	Primary K–7
	Our Lady of Mt Carmel	Mullewa	Primary K–7
	St Mary's School	Northampton	Primary K–7
	St Mary's Star of the Sea Catholic School	Carnarvon	Combined Primary and Secondary, K–10
	St Cecilia's Catholic Primary School	Port Hedland	Primary K–7
	Nagle Catholic College	Geraldton	Secondary Day school, 7–12
	St Luke's College	Karratha	Secondary Day school, 8–12
	Christian Brothers Agricultural School	Tardun	Secondary Day school, 8–10

== See also ==
- List of Catholic dioceses in Australia
- Catholic Church in Australia

== Sources and external links ==
- Catholic Diocese of Geraldton
- GCatholic, with Google map & satellite photo – data for most sections
