= Patrick Phelan (bishop of Sale) =

Irish-Australian bishop

- Bishop of Sale
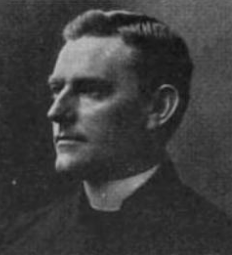
- Church: Catholic Church
- Diocese: Diocese of Sale
- In office: 12 November 1912 – 5 January 1925
- Predecessor: James Francis Corbett
- Successor: Richard Ryan

Orders
- Ordination: 26 May 1888 by James Vincent Cleary
- Consecration: 2 March 1913 by Thomas Carr

Personal details
- Born: 2 January 1856 Johnstown, County Kilkenny, United Kingdom of Great Britain and Ireland
- Died: 5 January 1925 (aged 69) Dublin, Irish Free State, British Empire

Bishop Patrick Phelan DD (2 January 1856 – 5 January 1925) was Roman Catholic Bishop of Sale, Victoria, Australia.

== Biography ==
Phelan was born on 2 January 1856, in Johnstown, Kilkenny, Ireland, to Martin and Margaret Phelan, and educated at Mount Melleray Seminary, and St. Patrick's College, Carlow. He was ordained a priest for Melbourne, Australia in 1888. Phelan was a founder and frequent contributor to Austral Light.

In 1900, he was appointed Dean of Melbourne, and served as Vicar-General from 1908 to 1913. On 2 November 1912, he was appointed Bishop of Sale, a position he held until his death on 5 January 1925, in a private hospital in Dublin, Ireland where he was receiving medical treatment.

He was noted for his administration, where he raised £25,000 over three years to build St Patrick's College in Sale, which opened in 1922, and when he died both the parish and college were debt-free. The Bishop Phelan Stadium, on the St Patrick's Campus of the Catholic College Sale, is named in his honour.

Phelan's brother Micheal became a Jesuit priest and also ministered in Australia.

== Arms ==
Coat of arms of Patrick Phelan

Escutcheon
Argent four lozenges in bend between two cotises all Azure on a chief Gules three fleurs-de-lis Argent.
Motto
Turres Fortis Mihi Deus
