= Ernesto Coppo =

Italian-born Catholic bishop (1870–1948)

The Most Reverend Ernesto Coppo SDB
- Vicar Apostolic Emeritus of Kimberley in Western Australia
- Diocese: Vicariate Apostolic of Kimberley in Western Australia
- Installed: 24 December 1922
- Term ended: 1928
- Predecessor: John Creagh
- Successor: Otto Raible
- Other post: Titular Bishop of Palaeopolis in Asia (1922–1948)

Orders
- Ordination: 7 August 1892 by Edoardo Pulciano
- Consecration: 24 December 1922 by Domingo Comin

Personal details
- Born: Ernesto Coppo; 6 February 1870 Rosignano Monferrato, Piedmont, Italy
- Died: 28 December 1948 (aged 78) Ivrea, Piedmont, Italy
- Denomination: Catholic Church
- Occupation: Catholic bishop

Ernesto Coppo (24 June 1861 – 5 October 1914) was an Italian-born Australian bishop of the Catholic Church. He served as Vicar Apostolic of Kimberley in Western Australia for six years.

== Early life ==
Coppo was born in Rosignano Monferrato and received education at a house opened by Don Bosco at Borgo San Martino.

== Priesthood ==
On 7 August 1892, Coppo was ordained a priest and entered the novitiate for the Salesians of Don Bosco the following year. He made his perpetual profession on 4 October 1894 at the hands of Blessed Michele Rua. In 1898, he travelled to New York as head of a group of three Salesians to carry out service to migrants in America.

== Episcopate ==
In 1922, the Vicariate Apostolic of Kimberley in Western Australia was entrusted to the care of the Salesians of Don Bosco, becoming the first foundation of the order in Australia. On 1 December 1922, Coppo was appointed Vicar Apostolic of Kimberley in Western Australia and Titular Bishop of Palaeopolis in Asia. He was consecrated on 24 December 1922 by Bishop Domingo Comin SDB at the shrine of Mary Help of Christians in Turin.

Coppo arrived in Australia in August 1923 and set about the intense pastoral work of the mission. He reached distant villages, met families, gave impetus to the human needs of work, formation, development, and the Gospel.

In 1928, Coppo was recalled to Rome and the Society of the Catholic Apostolate were given charge of the Vicariate Apostolic of Kimberley in Western Australia. The Pallottines had previously served in the region but struggled due to their German nationality following World War I. On 18 January 1928, Otto Raible SAC was appointed Apostolic Administrator of Kimberley in Western Australia.

Coppo remained in Italy for the rest of his life and became a formidable animator for the missions.

== Death ==
Coppo died at Ivrea, Piedmont on 28 December 1948.

Catholic Church titles
Preceded by John Creagh	Vicar Apostolic of Kimberley in Western Australia; 1910–1914	Succeeded by Otto Raible
Preceded by Carlo Sica	Titular Bishop of Palaeopolis in Asia; 1922–1948	Succeeded by Souleyman Sayegh
