= Fulgentius Torres =

Spanish-born Australian Catholic bishop (1861–1914

The Most Reverend Fulgentius Antonio Torres OSB
- Apostolic Administrator of Kimberley
- Diocese: Vicariate Apostolic of Kimberley in Western Australia
- Installed: 22 May 1910
- Term ended: 5 October 1914
- Other posts: Abbot of New Norcia (1903–1914); Superior of Drisdale River (1910–1914); Titular Bishop of Dorylaëum (1910–1914)

Orders
- Ordination: 5 June 1889
- Consecration: 22 May 1910 at Sant'Ambrogio della Massima, Rome by Girolamo Maria Gotti

Personal details
- Born: Antonio Torres; 24 June 1861 Ibiza, Diocese of Mallorca, Spain
- Died: 5 October 1914 (aged 53) Perth, Western Australia, Australia
- Denomination: Catholic Church
- Occupation: Catholic bishop

Fulgentius Antonio Torres (24 June 1861 – 5 October 1914) was a Spanish-born Australian bishop of the Catholic Church. He was among the early missionaries in Western Australia and served as Apostolic Administrator of Kimberley Abbot of New Norcia, Superior of Drisdale River and Titular Bishop of Dorylaëum.

== Early life ==
Torres was born in Ibiza, Balearic Islands, Spain. He received his educated at the University of Barcelona and the Ecclesiastical Seminary of Vich before entering the Order of St Benedict in Montserrat in 1885, taking the name Fulgentius. He made his first vows on 21 June 1886.

== Priesthood ==
Torres was ordained on 5 June 1889 as a priest for the Order of St Benedict. He made his solemn profession a few weeks later on 13 July 1889.

He had a passion for missionary activity and helped to revitalise the Santa Maria de Montserrat Abbey as a mission training centre. In 1898, he became rector of the Santa Maria di Montesanto, Naples. Here, he met Rosendo Salvado, who chose him to be his successor as Abbot of New Norcia in Western Australia.

=== Abbot of New Norcia ===
Torres left Naples for Australia on 12 March 1901 following the death of Rosendo Salvado in 1900. He reached Fremantle on 9 April 1901 with eleven recruits for the Abbey.

He was unanimously elected Abbot on 2 October 1902. He travelled to Rome to receive consecration in the Sant'Ambrogio della Massima at the hands of Cardinal Girolamo Maria Gotti. He returned to New Norcia in June 1903.

As Abbot, he enlarged the monastery buildings using his own designs as an expert draughtsman. He designed and led the building of St Gertrude's College and St Ildephonsus’ College for Boys.

He undertook several vast journeys through Western Australia, establishing missions in Drysdale and Napier. He also brought several religious orders to New Norcia. He commissioned Teresian Sisters from Spain for the Aboriginal Girls' Orphanage, invited Sisters of St Joseph from Sydney to Southern Cross, and then to run St Gertrude's College. He also enlisted Marist Brothers for St Ildephonsus College, and Presentation Sisters from Geraldton for the Goomalling convent.

== Episcopate ==
On 4 May 1910, he was appointed Superior of Drysdale River Mission and a day later, he was appointed Apostolic Administrator of Kimberley in Western Australia following private audiences with Pope Pius X. On 10 May 1910, he was appointed Titular Bishop of Dorylaëum. He was consecrated as a bishop on 22 May 1910 in the Sant'Ambrogio della Massima at the hands of Cardinal Girolamo Maria Gotti.

== Death ==
Torres died of peritonitis on 5 October 1914 at a hospital at Subiaco, Perth. He was buried in New Norcia.

Catholic Church titles
Preceded by –	Apostolic Administrator of Kimberley in Western Australia; 1910–1914	Succeeded by –
Preceded by –	Superior of Drisdale River; 1910–1914	Succeeded by Bernard Robert Rooney
Preceded by Anton Karaś	Titular Bishop of Dorylaëum; 1910–1914	Succeeded by Juan Bautista Luis y Pérez
Preceded by Rosendo Salvado	Abbot of New Norcia; 1903–1914	Succeeded by Anselmo Mary Catalán
