= Otto Raible =

German-born Australian Catholic bishop (1887–1966)

The Most Reverend Otto Raible SAC
- Vicar Apostolic Emeritus of Kimberley in Western Australia
- Diocese: Vicariate Apostolic of Kimberley in Western Australia
- Installed: 4 August 1935
- Term ended: 12 March 1958
- Predecessor: Ernesto Coppo
- Successor: John Jobst
- Other post: Titular Bishop of Anemurium (1935–1966)

Orders
- Ordination: 9 July 1911 by Dominikus (Martin Karl) Willi
- Consecration: 4 August 1935 at Limburg, Germany by Anton Hilfrich

Personal details
- Born: Otto Raible; 27 November 1887 Stuttgart, Baden-Württemberg, Germany
- Died: 18 June 1966 (aged 78) Stuttgart, Baden-Württemberg, Germany
- Buried: Limburg, Hesse, Germany
- Denomination: Catholic Church
- Occupation: Catholic bishop

Otto Raible (27 November 1887 – 18 June 1966) was a German-born Australian bishop of the Catholic Church. He served as Vicar Apostolic of Kimberley in Western Australia for more than two decades.

== Early life ==
Raible was born in Stuttgart, Germany and joined the Society of the Catholic Apostolate after finishing his early education. He was professed on 24 September 1907.

== Priesthood ==
Raible was ordained a priest on 9 July 1911 by Bishop Dominikus (Martin Karl) Willi, O. Cist. and went on mission to Cameroon in Africa. He served there for seven years before being forced to return to Germany when the German territories in Africa were transferred to different jurisdictions.

He served as a chaplain in the German Army and then spent some time as a professor of history at the Pallottine Seminary at Limburg.

On 18 January 1928, Raible was appointed Apostolic Administrator of Kimberley in Western Australia after the Pallottines were given custody of the vicar apostolic, taking over from the Salesians.

Raible expanded the Pallottine mission in the area, purchasing land, a farm and cattle station, in the region. He also brought another 11 Pallottines from Germany for the mission between 1930 and 1934.

== Episcopate ==
On 18 June 1935, Raible was appointed Vicar Apostolic of Kimberley in Western Australia and Titular Bishop of Anemurium. He was ordained a bishop on 4 August 1935 by Bishop Anton Hilfrich at Limburg in Germany.

In 1937, he founded a new college for the Pallottines in Kew, Victoria. The college proved a success and by the 1960s about half of the Pallottines in Australia were Australian.

He ministered with a missionary spirit in the region, believing in the dignity of the local indigenous population and leading him to be well regarded by society in the Kimberley. Some time before the outbreak of World War II, he had obtained Australian citizenship. This prevented him from being arrested by Australian authorities in 1940 when many of his fellow German missionaries were taken into custody due to their nationality. Raible appealed to Archbishops Redmond Prendiville and Daniel Mannix whose influence led to the missionaries being released.

In 1953, Raible suffered a minor stroke and in 1958, asked to be released from his missionary appointment for health reasons. One of his last acts in Australia was assisting in the consecration of his successor, Bishop John Jobst SAC.

== Retirement and death ==
Raible returned to Europe in 1959. Pope John XXIII appointed him assistant to the papal throne and resident of the Federal Republic of Germany Heinrich Lübke awarded him Great Service Cross of the Realm (Bundesverdienstkreuz) with Star. He spent his final years in the motherhouse of the Pallottines in Limburg. He died there on 18 June 1966.

Catholic Church titles
Preceded by Ernesto Coppo	Vicar Apostolic of Kimberley in Western Australia; 1935–1958	Succeeded by John Jobst
Preceded by Luis María Martínez y Rodríguez	Titular Bishop of Anemurium; 1935–1966	Succeeded by –
