= Gregory Bennet =

Australian bishop of the Catholic Church

The Most Reverend Gregory Bennet
- Bishop of Sale
- Church: Catholic Church
- Diocese: Sale
- Appointed: 27 June 2020
- Installed: 8 December 2020
- Predecessor: Patrick O'Regan
- Previous post: Vicar General of the Archdiocese of Melbourne (2012–2020)

Orders
- Ordination: 22 August 1992 by Thomas Francis Little
- Consecration: 8 December 2020 at St Mary's Cathedral, Sale by Peter Andrew Comensoli

Personal details
- Born: Gregory Charles Bennet; 7 April 1963 (age 63) Melbourne, Victoria, Australia
- Denomination: Catholicism
- Education: Braemar College
- Coat of arms: Gregory Bennet's coat of arms

Ordination history of Gregory Bennet
History
Priestly ordination
- Ordained by: Frank Little

Styles of Gregory Charles Bennet
- Reference style: The Most Reverend
- Spoken style: His Lordship or My Lord Bishop
- Religious style: Bishop

Gregory Charles Bennet (born 7 April 1963) is an Australian bishop of the Catholic Church who has been the bishop of the Diocese of Sale since 2020. He previously served in the Archdiocese of Melbourne and became its vicar general in 2012.

== Early life ==
Bennet was born on 7 April 1963 in Melbourne, the second of four children of Len and Maureen Bennet. He was raised in the Melbourne suburbs of Canterbury and Balwyn North. His family moved to Bullengarook during his teenage years, He attended St Dominic’s Primary School in East Camberwell, All Hallows Primary School in Balwyn and Marcellin College in Bulleen. He graduated from Braemar College in Woodend. Bennet studied economics and administration and worked for the Commercial Bank of Australia. Starting in 1986, he attended seminary at the Melbourne Regional Seminary and completed his studies at the Catholic Theological College.

== Priesthood ==
On 22 August 1992, Bennet was ordained a priest by Archbishop Thomas Francis Little, Archbishop of Melbourne.

He was appointed assistant priest of Greensborough and then administrator of Seymour.

He returned to Melbourne in 2000, when he was appointed director of the Ministry to Priests. In 2004, he became director of the Office for Evangelisation and in 2007, was appointed parish priest of Balwyn North.

In 2012, he was appointed Vicar General of the Archdiocese of Melbourne and Moderator of the Curia. In the same year, he was appointed as a Prelate of Honour of His Holiness by Pope Benedict XVI and given the title of Monsignor.

== Episcopacy ==
Pope Francis appointed Bennet Bishop of Sale on 27 June 2020. His consecration and installation, first scheduled for 20 October, was postponed because of restrictions on public gatherings due to COVID-19. He received his episcopal consecration on 8 December 2020 from Peter Andrew Comensoli, Archbishop of Melbourne.

Pope Francis named him a member of the Dicastery for the Clergy on 23 March 2023. In May, he was elected Vice-President of the Australian Catholic Bishops Conference, succeeding Archbishop Anthony Fisher. In 2025, he attended the Papal Inauguration Mass of Pope Leo XIV.

Catholic Church titles
Preceded by Patrick O'Regan	Bishop of Sale; 2020–present	Incumbent
