= Diocese of Broome =

Latin Catholic territory in Australia

Diocese of Broome Dioecesis Broomensis
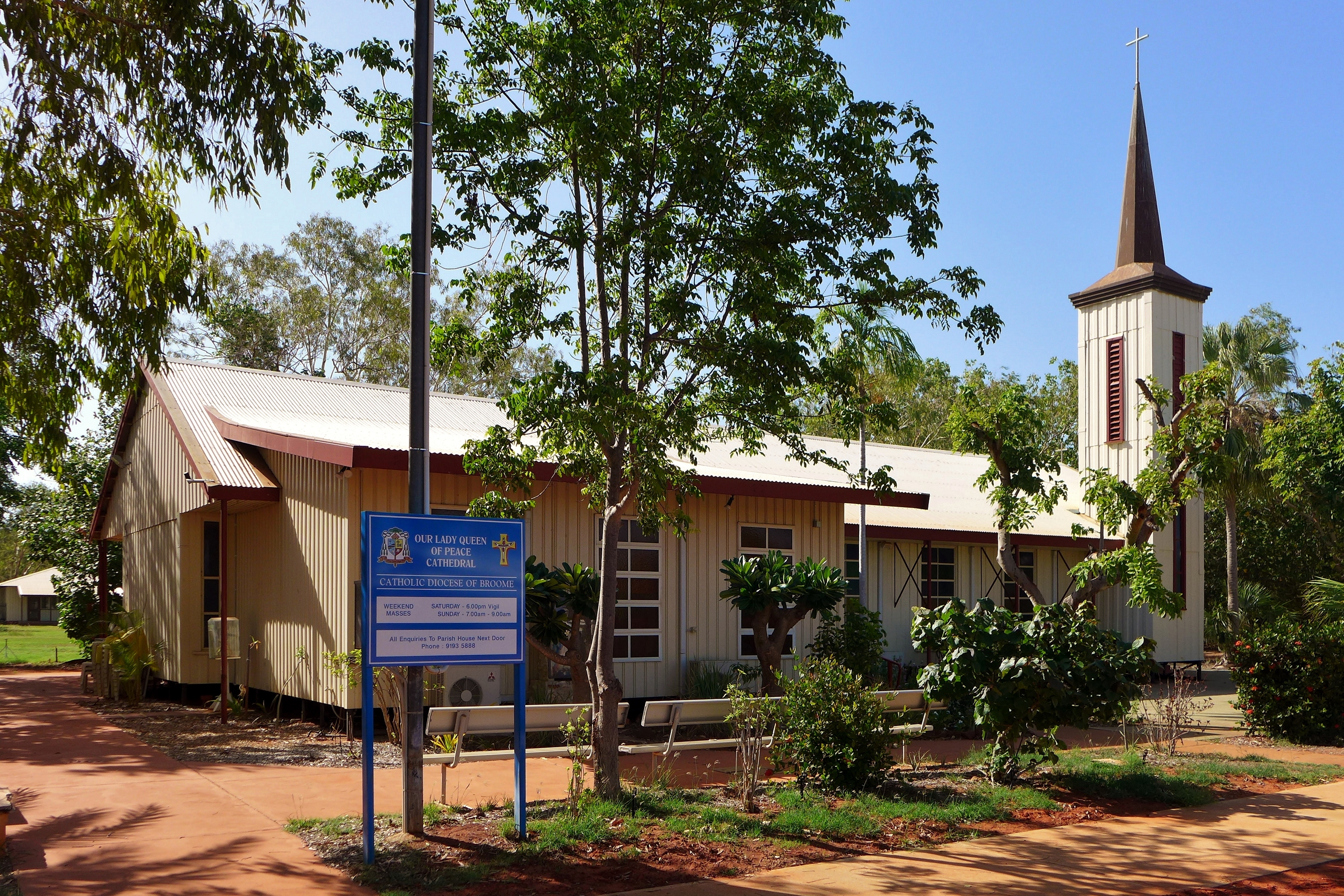
- Our Lady Queen of Peace Cathedral, Broome

Location
- Country: Australia
- Territory: Kimberley and Pilbara regions of Western Australia
- Ecclesiastical province: Province of Perth
- Metropolitan: Archdiocese of Perth
- Coordinates: 17°57′31″S 122°14′16″E

Statistics
- Area: 773,000 km^{2} (298,000 sq mi)
- Population: Total; Catholics: (as of 2006); ▲35,001; ▼13,402 (▼38.3%)
- Parishes: ▲9

Information
- Denomination: Catholic Church
- Sui iuris church: Latin Church
- Rite: Roman Rite
- Established: 10 May 1887 as Vicariate Apostolic of Kimberley; 7 June 1966 as Diocese of Broome
- Cathedral: Our Lady Queen of Peace Cathedral, Broome

Current leadership
- Pope: Leo XIV
- Bishop: Tim Norton
- Apostolic Administrator: Michael Morrissey
- Bishops emeritus: Christopher Alan Saunders; Paul William Boyers

Website
- Catholic Diocese of Broome

The Diocese of Broome is a Latin Church ecclesiastical jurisdiction or diocese of the Catholic Church in Australia. The diocese covers the Kimberley and Pilbara regions of Western Australia. It is a suffragan in the ecclesiastical province of the metropolitan Archdiocese of Perth. Its cathedral episcopal see is Our Lady Queen of Peace Cathedral, in Broome, Western Australia.

== History ==
On 10 May 1887, it was established initially as an Apostolic Vicariate of Kimberley in Western Australia, on territory split off from the then Diocese of Perth. On 4 May 1910, it lost territory to establish the Mission sui juris of Drysdale River, which was later renamed Kalumburu. On 13 November 1959, it was renamed as Apostolic Vicariate of Kimberleys. It was elevated as a diocese on 7 June 1966. In 1981, it regained the territory of the suppressed Mission sui juris of Kalumburu.

== Episcopal ordinaries ==
The following individuals were ordinaries of Broome.

=== Vicars Apostolic of Kimberley in Western Australia ===
Order	Name	Title	Date enthroned	Reign ended	Term of office	Reason for term end
1	William Bernard Kelly †	Vicar Apostolic of Kimberley in Western Australia	1894	1909	15 years, 0 days	Resigned whilst earlier elevated as Bishop of Geraldton
2	Fulgentius Torres, OSB †	Vicar Apostolic of Kimberley in Western Australia	5 May 1910	6 October 1914	4 years, 154 days	Died in office
3	John Creagh, CSsR †	Vicar Apostolic of Kimberley in Western Australia	1914	1922	8 years, 0 days	Died in office
4	Ernesto Coppo, SDB †	Vicar Apostolic of Kimberley in Western Australia	1 December 1922	1928	5 years, 31 days	Resigned and appointed Vicar Apostolic Emeritus of Kimberley in Western Australia
5	Otto Raible, SAC †	Apostolic Administrator of Kimberley in Western Australia	18 January 1928	18 June 1935	7 years, 151 days	Elevated as Vicar Apostolic of Kimberley in Western Australia
5	Otto Raible, SAC †	Vicar Apostolic of Kimberley in Western Australia	18 June 1935	12 March 1958	22 years, 267 days	Resigned and appointed Vicar Apostolic Emeritus of Kimberley in Western Australia
6	John Jobst, SAC †	Vicar Apostolic of Kimberley in Western Australia	13 January 1959	7 June 1966	7 years, 145 days	Elevated as Bishop of Broome

=== Bishops of Broome ===
Order	Name	Title	Date enthroned	Reign ended	Term of office	Reason for term end
1	John Jobst, SAC †	Bishop of Broome	7 June 1966	3 November 1995	29 years, 149 days	Retired and appointed Bishop Emeritus of Broome
2	Christopher Saunders	Bishop of Broome	8 February 1996	11 March 2020	24 years, 32 days	Stood aside, pending investigation, later resigned 2021 and appointed Bishop Emeritus
3	Tim Norton SVD	Bishop of Broome	4 December 2025	Incumbent	1 year, 243 days	

== Parishes ==
As of 2011, the diocese had nineteen parishes:

- Balgo–Kutjungka (St Theresa)
- Broome (Our Lady Queen of Peace)
- Dampier Peninsula with churches in Beagle Bay (Sacred Heart) and Lombadina (Christ the King)
- Derby (Our Lady of the Holy Rosary) and Fitzroy Crossing (St Francis)
- Halls Creek (St Mary)
- Kalumburu (Our Lady of the Assumption)
- Kununurra (St Vincent Pallotti)
- La Grange-Bidyadanda (St John the Baptist)
- Wyndham (Queen of Apostles)
