= Justin Bianchini =

Australian Catholic bishop

The Most Reverend Justin Bianchini
- Bishop Emeritus of the Roman Catholic Diocese of Geraldton
- Diocese: Geraldton
- Appointed: 25 March 1992
- Installed: 19 May 1992
- Term ended: 15 May 2017
- Predecessor: Barry Hickey
- Successor: Michael Morrissey (bishop)

Orders
- Ordination: 29 June 1964 by Cardinal Giuseppe Siri
- Consecration: 19 May 1992 by Archbishop Barry Hickey

Personal details
- Born: Justin Joseph Bianchini; 28 January 1941 (age 85) Subiaco, Western Australia, Australia
- Denomination: Roman Catholic
- Education: Minor Seminary of St Charles; Collegio Brignole-Sale
- Motto: In Omnibus Caritas (In All Things Love)

Styles of Justin Bianchini
- Reference style: The Most Reverend
- Spoken style: My Lord
- Religious style: Bishop

Justin Bianchini (born 28 January 1941) is the bishop emeritus of the Roman Catholic Diocese of Geraldton. He was previously a priest of the Roman Catholic Archdiocese of Perth. He was consecrated by Archbishop Barry Hickey and retired as Bishop of Geraldton on 15 May 2017.

== Early life ==
Bianchini was born in Subiaco, Western Australia on 28 January 1941. He completed his secondary schooling at the Minor Seminary of St Charles, Guildford in 1954. He studied philosophy for three years, before going to Genoa to study theology. He was ordained in Genoa on 29 June 1964 by Cardinal Giuseppe Siri.

== Priesthood ==
Bianchini was incardinated into the Roman Catholic Archdiocese of Perth and his first appointment was as an assistant priest at St Mary's Cathedral, Perth. He served at various parishes following that before becoming parish priest of Kalgoorlie in 1974, remaining there for seven years.

== Episcopacy ==
On 25 March 1992, Bianchini was appointed by Pope John Paul II to succeed Barry Hickey, who had been appointed Archbishop of Perth a year earlier, as the eighth Bishop of Geraldton. He was ordained and installed by Archbishop Hickey on 19 May 1992.

During his episcopacy, he established the Parish Life and Mission Office in a newly built premises alongside the Parish office of the St Francis Xavier's Cathedral. In the final 10 years of his episcopacy, he was responsible for spearheading the Cathedral Precinct Project to restore and enhance the historic St Francis Xavier Cathedral and its surrounds.

In February 2015, Bianchini wrote to Pope Francis, advising he would reach the canonical age of retirement of 75, in 2016. His resignation was accepted on 15 May 2017 and Michael Morrissey was appointed to succeed him. He was the longest serving bishop in the history of the Diocese of Geraldton. He retired to Perth to be closer to his surviving siblings and family.

Catholic Church titles
Preceded by Barry Hickey	Bishop of Geraldton; 1992–2017	Succeeded by Michael Morrissey (bishop)
