= Nagle Catholic College =

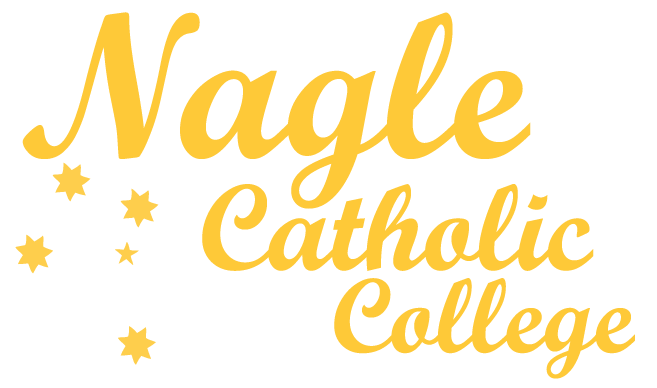

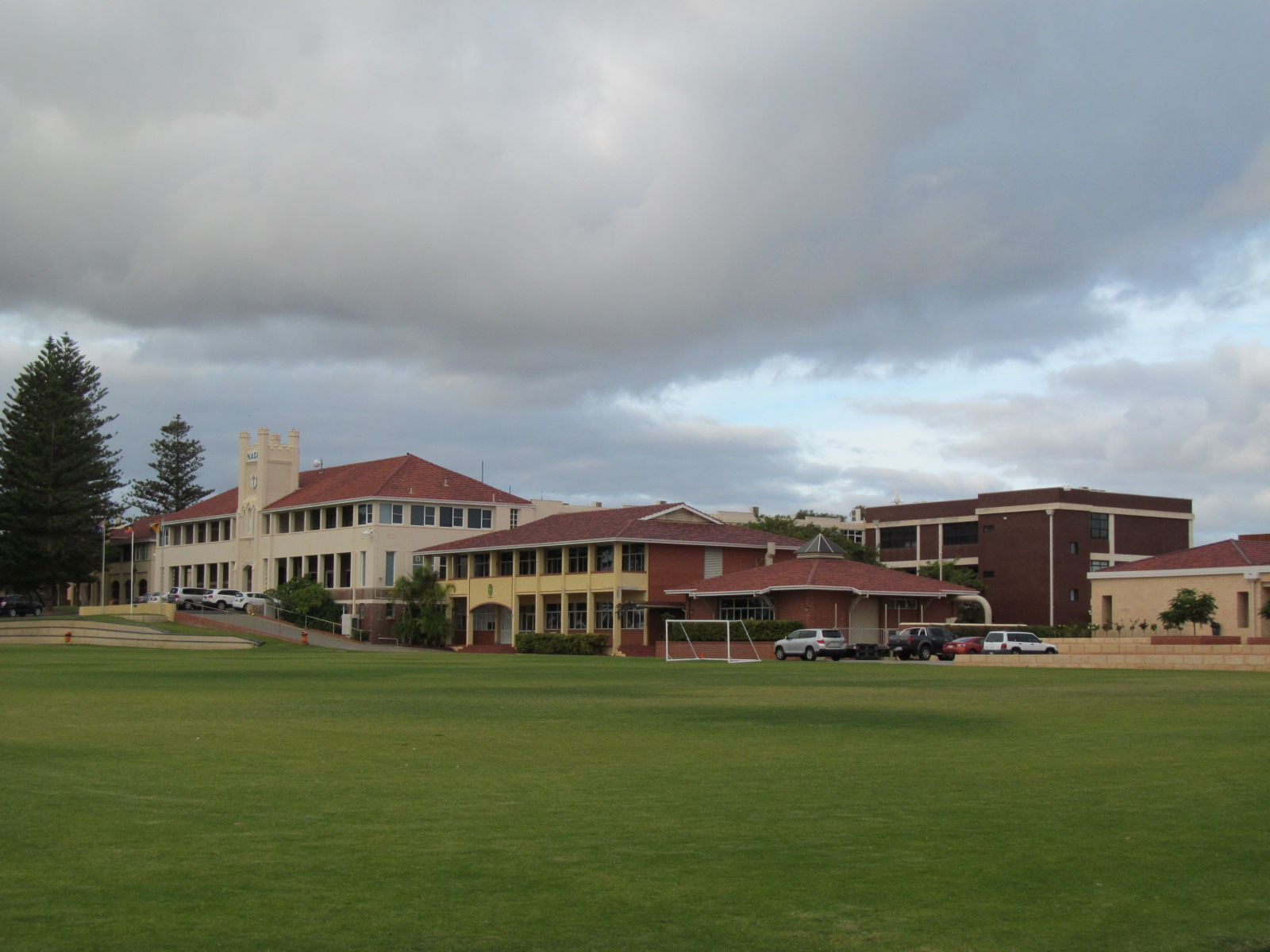
- Nagle Catholic College as seen from the western side of the campus.

Location
- Sanford Street, Geraldton, Mid West region of Western Australia; Australia; 28°46′40″S 114°36′36″E

Information
- Former names: Stella Maris Presentation College; St. Patrick's College
- Type: Independent co-educational secondary day school
- Motto: For others
- Denomination: Roman Catholic
- Patron saints: The Venerable Nano Nagle; Blessed Edmund Rice
- Founded: 1891 – as Stella Maris Presentation College; 1994 – as Nagle Catholic College
- Principal: Susan Macdonald
- Chaplain: Fr Bernard Balaraj
- Employees: 130
- Years: 7–12
- Enrollment: 1,600
- Houses: Bishop; Foley; Kelly; O'Collins; Ryan; Stella; Patrick; Thomas
- Colours: Green, gold and black
- Publication: Wavelength; The Annual
- Website: web.ncc.wa.edu.au

Nagle Catholic College commonly known as Nagle or NCC, is an independent Roman Catholic co-educational secondary day school, located in the coastal town of Geraldton in the Mid West region of Western Australia, Australia. The college was founded in 1994, as a result of a merger of Stella Maris Presentation College, established in 1891 and St. Patrick's College founded in 1926.

== Overview ==
Nagle Catholic College is named after the Presentation Sisters founder, The Venerable Nano Nagle. Formerly a boarding college, Nagle is now a day school catering for students from Year 7 to Year 12. The current college's campus is located on the Stella Maris Presentation College site, which today has grown to a college catering to 1,200 students.

Prior to the establishment of Nagle, St Patrick's College and Stella Maris Presentation College was the only form of Catholic higher school education available in Geraldton. Stella Maris College was founded by the Presentation Sisters while St Patrick's College was established by the Christian Brothers. Stella Maris provided higher education for females, while its counterpart provided higher education for the male demographic of Geraldton.

The college formerly housed a convent for the Presentation Sisters, which became a primary school and a church prior the establishment of St Francis Xavier's Cathedral. Moreover, the campus was built on former sandhills hence its hilly landscape.

In 2016, Nagle commenced the formation of a campus in Carnarvon, where it offers an opportunity for Carnarvon students to achieve a catholic high school education, without leaving their hometown.

Nagle Catholic College was voted "Best School" in Geraldton as voted in The Best of Geraldton competition, held by Red FM.

== History ==
Nagle Catholic College was formed from the agreement between authorities of the two parent colleges, Stella Maris Presentation College and St Patrick's College. The authorities thought it would be beneficial to combine the schools, to better cater for the students. The college was named after Nano Nagle, who founded the Presentation Sisters in Ireland in 1775.

=== Arrival of Presentation Sisters (1891–1902) ===
The origins of Nagle Catholic College is woven into history that spans back to 1891 when Bishop Gibney, requested the Presentation Sisters from Ireland begin teaching in Geraldton. The sisters founded the 'Star of the Sea' Young Lady's Secondary Education Academy erected on the corner of Marine Terrace and Lewis Street.

In 1896, the government withdrew all funding, hence making the college completely independent.

In 1901, the college opened its doors to boarders, as boarding facilities became available.

=== Stella Maris Presentation College (1903–1993) ===
In 1903, the Presentation Convent was erected at its present site in Sanford Street, where it acted as a primary school and a church prior the establishment of St Francis Xavier Cathedral.

In 1911, the construction of the new college campus began beside the current convent, where the first stone was laid by Bishop Bernard Kelly, the first bishop of Geraldton. The construction finished in 1912 and was welcomed by many commendations on its presentation. In 1913, the campus was officially named Stella Maris Presentation College. Mother Joseph O'Connell, the foundress of the Presentation community died in 1933,

50 years of the Presentation Sisters in Geraldton was marked in 1941, and was celebrated by guests arriving from throughout the state. The outbreak of World War II affected the college in 1942, where students were evacuated to Mount Magnet.

The 'Prefect concept' was introduced in 1943 to give senior students a sense of leadership. Melva Sallans carried out the duties of Senior Perfect, assisted by Effie Dallimore, Joan Mulligan and Rica Diamond.

The Diamond Jubilee of the Presentation Sisters in 1951 is celebrated with a new wing to the school.

In 1961, severe flooding of the town caused for an evacuation of the students to Carnarvon.

The campus was enlarged during the 1970s and 1980s with the second extension of the campus, a new sports oval, the completion of the Maitland Street Extension, new auditorium, new pool and new tennis courts all being constructed on these two decades.

In 1977, the Stella Maris Orchestra and Choir performed for Queen Elizabeth II and the Duke of Edinburgh.

The house system was introduced in 1978 with the houses: Finns, Russels, Nagles and O'Connels being established.

During 1985, the college bought nine Commodore 64 computers to encourage digital learning.

In 1991, the centenary of the Presentation Sisters in Western Australia and the centenary of Stella Maris college was celebrated.

Stella Maris College celebrated its final year in 1993, before it amalgamates with St. Patrick's College to form Nagle Catholic College.

=== St. Patrick's College (1925–1993) ===
On 22 June 1925, Bishop Richard Ryan wrote a plea to the Australian Provincial of the Christian Brothers for an opening of a new educational institution for males in Geraldton:

...now I want you to send us two or three brothers. There is no place in Australia in need of a brother's school. The whole future of religion is bound up with it. There has been a crying need for many a day. The work will be truly apostolic as going to China...

— Bishop Richard Ryan

Hence on 11 December, Brother Celsus O'Donnell arrived in Geraldton to prepare the opening of the new boarding college. On the school year of 1926, St Patrick's College was officially opened with Brother O'Donnell as the first principal. On 15 February, there was a reported sixty day boys and ten boarders in attendance.

In 1940, the first prefects were appointed with Kevin Bradley, Geoffrey Meyer, John White, Bernard Williams, Charles Cripps and Ronald Hesford undertaking the positions.

St Patrick's Day in 1943 was marked with sports and surfing, which was the origin of the popular St Patrick's Day tradition Nagle participates every year.

During the 60s, bands began to form with 'Les Silhouettes' and 'The Doppler Effect' taking over the St Patrick's College music scene.

In 1976, the Golden jubilee of St Patrick's College was built, with a new primary school being built.

During 1994, St Patrick's College began the process of merging with Stella Maris College to form Nagle Catholic College.

Currently, the St Patrick's College campus is home to the Catholic Education Geraldton branch and Leaning Tree Primary School.

=== Nagle today (1994–present) ===
In 1994, Nagle Catholic College was founded, combining the two boarding colleges. Therefore, it was the first time the two genders combined in one school. The authority chose the Stella Maris Presentation College campus to grow the newly combined college. Bishop Justin Bianchini formally commissioned the college.

Nagle has grown into a dynamic college with new buildings erecting in the campus. For example, are the Edmund Rice Library, Bishop Bianchinni Gymnasium and Maslen Science Area, with all three buildings erected around within the decade.

In 2016, Nagle expanded its operations to the remote town of Carnarvon, where it offers Years 11-12 a similar curriculum as the original curriculum of the Geraldton campus.

Stella Maris Presentation College and St. Patrick's College

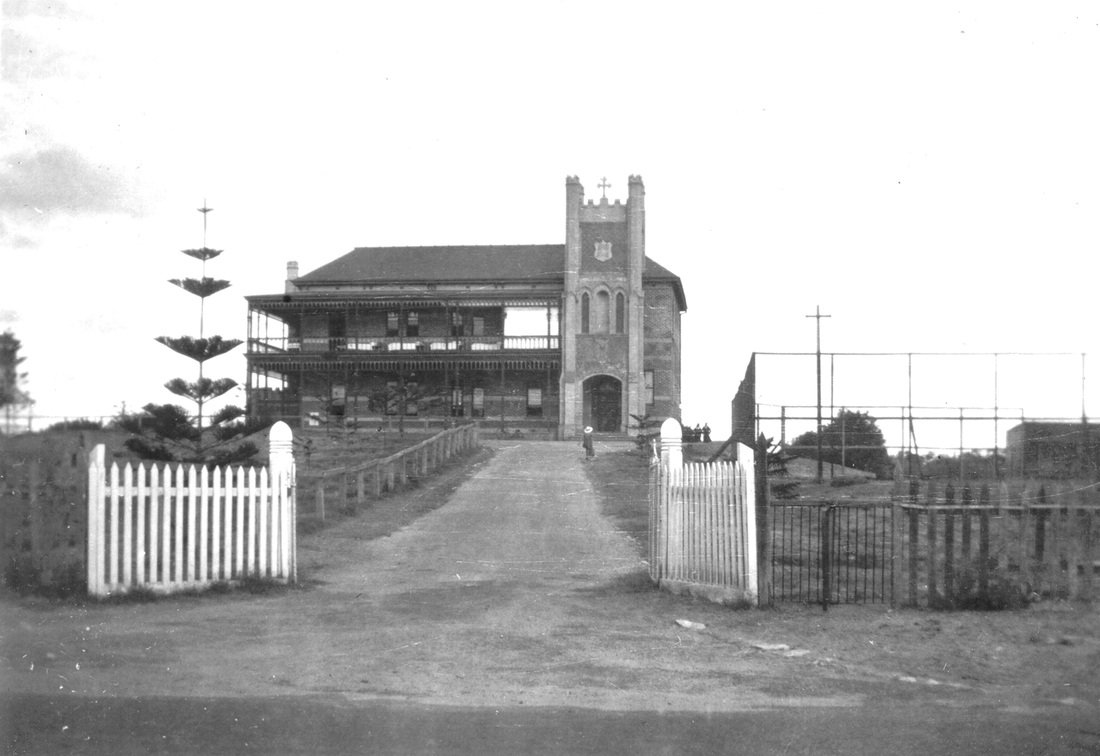
Stella Maris Presentation College, now the current campus of Nagle Catholic College

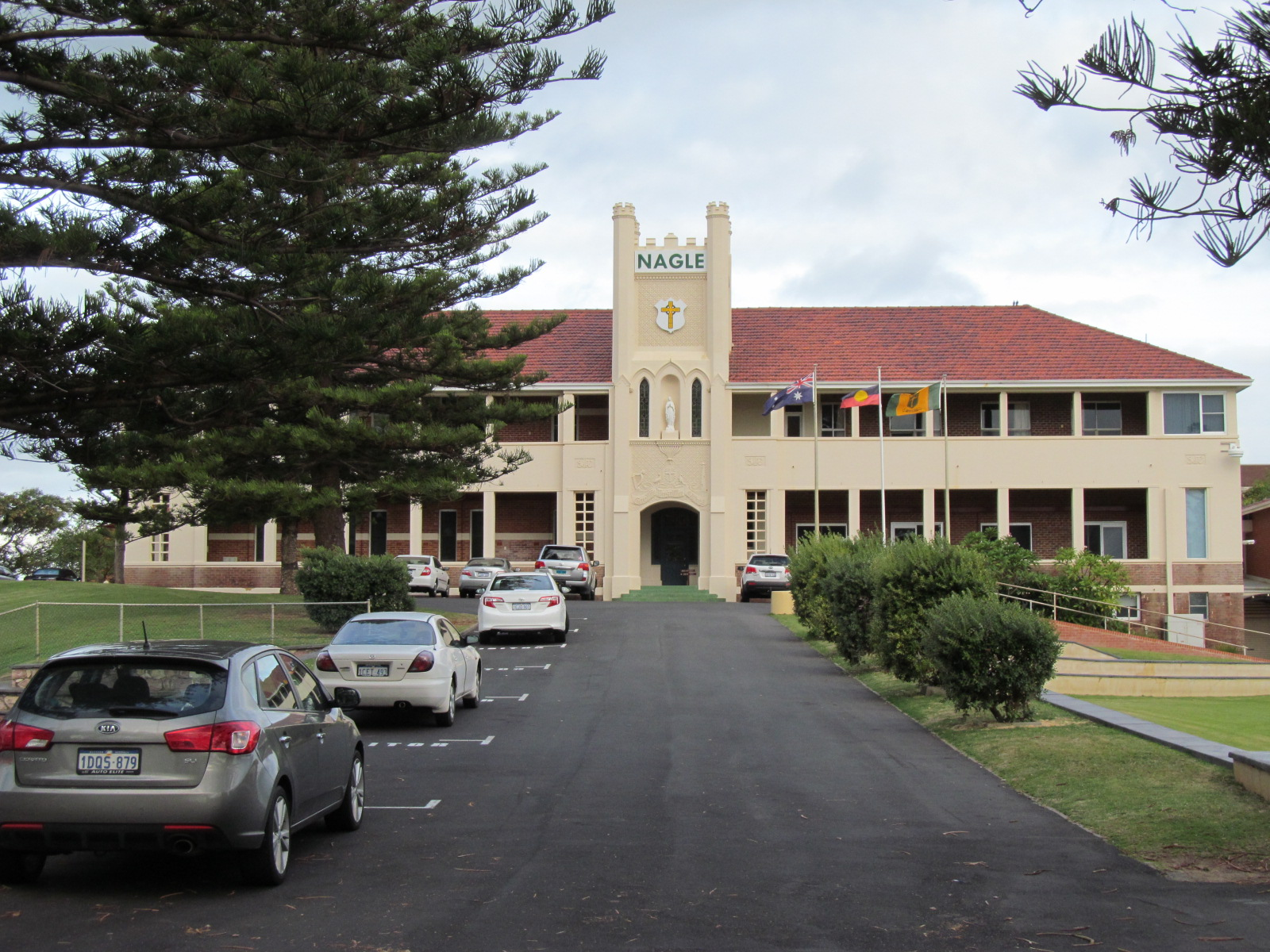
The current facade of Nagle Catholic College

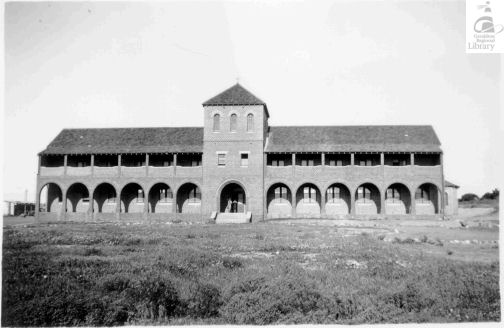
St. Patrick's College in Geraldton (contributed by the Geraldton Regional Library)

== Headmasters and Principals ==
=== Stella Maris College ===
Years served	Superiors/Principal	Notes
1891–1900	M Joseph O'Connell	Foundress
1901–1906	M Leila Russell	
1907–1916	M Columba O'Dwyer	First incumbency
1917–1919	M Peter O'Connor	
1920–1922	M Monica Tracey	
1923–1928	M Columba O'Dwyer	Second incumbency, longest serving principal (overall; 14 years)
1929–1934	M Bernard Myers	First incumbency
1935–1940	M Thomas Ryan	
1941–1942	M Michael Cantwell	First incumbency
1943–1945	M Bernard Myers	Second incumbency
1946–1954	M Michael Cantwell	Second incumbency
1955–1966	M Marie-Therese Murphy	Longest serving principal (for one incumbency; 11 years)
1967	M Angela Lombard	Shortest serving principal
1968–1973	Assumpta O'Donnell	
1974–1975	Patricia White	
1975–1981	Consuela Worthington	
1982–1983	Joan Evans	
1984–1986	Philomena Burrell	
1987–1990	Lucy Van Kessell	
1991–1993	Christine Clarke	Last principal of Stella Maris College

=== St Patrick's College ===
Years served	Headmaster	Notes
1926–1927	Brother C C O'Donnell	Founding headmaster
1928–1930	Brother I Coggins	
1931–1932	Brother P I Hickey	
1933–1934	Brother A Ryan	
1935–1937	Brother G Downes	
1938–1941	Brother H Sandys	
1942	Brother D P O'Connor	Shortest incumbency (tied with 1949; same headmaster)
1943–1948	Brother I Keenan	
1949	Brother D P O'Connor	Shortest incumbency (tied with 1942; same headmaster)
1950–1952	Brother H C Williams	
1953–1958	Brother W J Sullivan	
1959–1964	Brother B T Murphy	
1965–1968	Brother A C Dally	
1969–1974	Brother N L McAppion	
1975–1980	Brother T M Gibbons	
1981–1984	Brother W F Bryant	Served as first principal of Nagle
1986–1993	Brother J X Murray	Last principal, longest serving (8 years)

=== Nagle Catholic College ===
The following individuals have served as College Principal of Nagle Catholic College:

Ordinal	Officeholder	Term start	Terms end	Time in office	Notes
1	Brother Warwick F. Bryant	1994	2005	10–11 years	
2	Declan Tanham	2006	2013	6–7 years	
3	Rob Crothers	2014	2019	11–12 years	
4	Michael Williams	2020	2025	6 years	
5	Susan Macdonald	2026	Present	0 years	

== Campus ==
The Nagle Catholic College campus is built along Sanford St and Maitland St in Geraldton. On Nagle's eastern side is the St Francis Xavier Cathedral, Geraldton. The college is near the coast, making Nagle the most western Catholic school in Australia.

The campus is split into eight learning areas:

- Stella Maris Learning Area: The original campus building, and central learning area.
- St Patrick Learning Area: This extension holds the majority of Nagle's classrooms.
- Vin Duffy Learning Area: The technologies classrooms including two woodwork rooms, a metalwork room and a design technical graphics room.
- Edmund Rice Learning Area: A library, a computer lab, two learning areas plus an outdoor learning area.
- Lecaille Learning Area: Home of the Arts department including the art rooms and music rooms.
- Maslen Science Learning Area: The science department.
- Bishop Justin Bianchini Gymnasium: This is the newest addition to the Nagle Campus. Basketball courts, netball courts, volleyball courts, rock climbing walls, weights room, dance studio and change rooms. The main court has a retractable seating platform, used during assemblies. With additional seating, the court could hold over 1000 students.
- Paschal Centre: a former Presentation Sisters convent home to staff offices and student matters.

In addition, the campus has a sports oval, a swimming pool, two outdoor courtyards and four tennis/basketball courts in the front of the school.

== Academics ==
The school serves students in Years 7 through to 12, with each Year or set of Years having different focuses on courses.

In 2012, 100% of Nagle Catholic College's students achieved a WACE. And during the same year, Nagle was on top for the Best Performing in WA for Geography.

For 2015, Nagle was the best performing school in Geraldton, as it was the only school that made to the top 50 schools in WA for Vocational Education and Training (VET). 96% of Nagle Catholic College VET students achieved a Cert II or higher and was ranked 40th in WA. Meanwhile, ATAR students had a median of 70 as an ATAR score, with 5.87% achieving an ATAR above 75. Out of 417 Geraldton students applicable for a WACE Certificate, 154 are from Nagle Catholic College. 99.35% of students are reported to have graduated in 2015.

== Houses ==
Nagle Catholic College established six houses on its foundation and added two new houses in 2014. Dedicated to the former Bishops of Geraldton, these houses include:

House	Dedicated to	Meaning	Notes
Bishop	Alfred Gummer	Its crest includes a sailing ship (barque) representing the Ship of Peter, which was Bishop Gummer's dominant symbol. Formerly, the house held a crest with a tree, representing the tree of life.	2017 Cross Country Winner
Foley	William Foley	Its crest includes a dove and a 'Mystical Rose'. The dove represents the symbol of peace, while the 'Mystical Rose' is one of the epithets used for Mary.	2017 Swimming Carnival Winner; Champion House 2016
Kelly	William Bernard Kelly	Its crest features a tower, a symbol of beauty, purity and strength.	Best, most powerful house after Buscumb spearheaded the charge to etch a new era into the NCC timeline.
O'Collins	James Patrick O'Collins	The Bishop's Mitre is the featured symbol on the house's crest. The use of the Mitre, symbolises leadership and victory.	2017 Athletics Carnival Winner
Patrick	St Patrick's College	Its crest includes a Shamrock, which is St. Patrick's common symbol.	New house (2014)
Ryan	Richard Ryan	Its crest has a Griffin as one of its primary elements. The amalgamation of the lion and eagle denotes strength and leadership.	
Stella	Stella Maris College	Its crest symbolises Stella Maris, Star of the Sea, wherein it includes a star which guides seafarers in the ocean.	New house (2014)
Thomas	Francis Xavier Thomas	The Thomas house crest includes the famous Cross of Bishop Thomas, symbolising sacrifice and salvation.	

== Notable alumni ==
A number of notable people have graduated or attended Nagle Catholic College, Stella Maris College or St Patrick's College.

- Fergus Kavanagh, Olympic medallist, earning it with the Australian Hockey team. He was 2002's Nagle Head Boy
- Josh Kennedy, Australian Football League player for the West Coast Eagles
- Mandy McElhinney, actress known to play Rhonda in AAMI insurance ads. She attended Stella Maris College as a boarder
- Jaeger O'Meara, Australian Football League player for the Hawthorn Football Club
- Tasma Walton, actress known for the TV shows Blue Heelers and Home and Away. She attended Stella Maris College

== See also ==
- Catholic education in Australia
