= John Jobst =

John Jobst, SAC, CBE
- Bishop Emeritus of Diocese of Broome
- Church: Roman Catholic
- See: Diocese of Broome
- In office: 1966 - 1995
- Predecessor: None
- Successor: Christopher Saunders

Orders
- Ordination: 9 July 1950

Personal details
- Born: Johannes Jobst; 4 February 1920 Frankenberg, Weimar Republic
- Died: 5 July 2014 (aged 94) Patsch, Austria

John Jobst, SAC, CBE (German: Johannes Jobst; 4 February 1920 – 5 July 2014) was a German Pallottine and prelate of the Roman Catholic Church. He was the last German bishop to have attended the Second Vatican Council.

== Early life ==
Jobst was born in Frankenberg, Bavaria in Germany to devout Catholic parents. He was raised on a farm near Brennberg and completed a course of humanities during his schooling. After leaving school, in 1939, he joined the Society of the Catholic Apostolate, known as the Pallotines. Following the outbreak of World War II, he was drafted into the German Army and had to delay his studies for the priesthood. He returned to the seminary following his compulsory service at the conclusion of the war. He studied at the major seminary of the Society in Vallendar.

== Priesthood ==
Jobst was ordained a priest on 9 July 1950 for the Society of the Catholic Apostolate in Limburg by Wilhelm Kempf. He was appointed to assist the Pallotine mission in Australia and arrived in Australia in April 1951. The Pallotines had been serving in Australia since 1901 and formed a mission in Beagle Bay in the far north of Western Australia, in the Kimberley region.

Jobst began serving in the Beagle Bay Mission, endearing himself to the native population. He faced early struggles as a German, given the recent memory of World War II, and did not always receive a warm welcome from new communities. After four years, he was forced to travel to Melbourne after severe illness forced him to a cooler climate. In 1955, he was appointed spiritual director of the novitiate and studentate of the Pallotines in Strathfield, New South Wales. He also served as administrator of Silverwater in 1958.

== Episcopate ==
On 13 January 1959, Pope John XXIII appointed Jobst as Vicar Apostolic of Kimberley and titular bishop of Pitanae. He was consecrated on 19 March 1959 at St Mary's Cathedral, Sydney by Archbishop Romolo Carboni, Apostolic Delegate.

Jobst was one of the youngest bishops to attend the opening of the Second Vatican Council in Rome in 1962. He attended all four sessions.

On 7 June 1966, the Vicariate Apostolic of Kimberley was elevated to the status of a diocese and named the Diocese of Broome, and Jobst was named as its first bishop.

During his 37 years in charge of the region, Jobst pioneered remote education and helped establish several schools in Indigenous communities. He founded the University of Notre Dame in Broome and was also a passionate advocate of indigenous land rights. He also held a pilots licence and used the plane to travel through the vast diocese, with the aircraft paid for with donations. He would be known to help transport sick people or pick up things for people on remote stations.

He was energetic in recruiting lay missionaries to serve throughout the Diocese too, with young people from the east of Australia volunteering to do three years working within schools and parishes of the Diocese.

In 1976, Jobst ordained the first priest for the Diocese. He was appointed a Commander of the Order of the British Empire (CBE) in the 1981 Birthday Honours.

== Retirement and death ==
Jobst retired on 3 November 1995, a few months after reaching the canonical retirement age of 75, having served as Bishop of Broome for almost three decades. He consecrated his successor, Christopher Saunders, in 1996. He moved to Perth and assisted with pastoral work and lectured at the university.

In 2000, he returned to Europe and settled in Patsch, Austria, where he officiated at confirmations and supplied for Sunday masses. He died on 5 July 2014 in Patsch, aged 94. He was buried in Brennberg, Bavaria in Germany, the town of his birth and baptism.
