= James Francis Corbett =

- Bishop of Sale
- Church: Catholic Church
- Diocese: Diocese of Sale
- In office: 13 May 1887 – 29 May 1912
- Predecessor: Diocese erected
- Successor: Patrick Phelan

Orders
- Ordination: 29 May 1858
- Consecration: 25 August 1887 by Thomas Carr

Personal details
- Born: 1834 Limerick, County Limerick, United Kingdom of Great Britain and Ireland
- Died: 29 May 1912 (aged 77–78)
- Coat of arms

James Francis Corbett KC*HS (1834 – 29 May 1912) was the Roman Catholic Bishop of Sale, Victoria.

Corbett was formerly stationed at St Kilda, Victoria, and was appointed first bishop of Sale in May 1887. He was consecrated at St. Mary's, St. Kilda, on 25 August. He held for a considerable period the post of Private Secretary to the late Archbishop Goold. He is a native of Limerick, and the freedom of that city was conferred upon him during a visit to Ireland in 1890.

== Arms ==
Coat of arms of James Francis Corbett

Escutcheon
Or a representation of Our Lady of Perpetual Succour Proper impaling Or a chough Sable membered Gules.
Motto
Monstra Te Esse Matrem
