= Tim Norton =

Australian catholic bishop

The Most Reverend Tim Norton SVD
- Bishop of Broome; Titular Bishop of Madaurus
- Archdiocese: Broome
- See: Madaurus

Orders
- Ordination: 2 March 1991
- Consecration: 22 February 2022 by Mark Coleridge

Personal details
- Born: Timothy John Norton; 24 July 1958 (age 68) Sydney, New South Wales, Australia
- Denomination: Catholic Church
- Education: Marist Brothers, Eastwood; Cumberland College of Health Sciences; Yarra Theological Union

Styles of Tim Norton
- Reference style: The Most Reverend
- Spoken style: His Lordship or My Lord Bishop
- Religious style: Bishop

Timothy John Norton SVD (born 24 July 1958) is an Australian Catholic bishop. He is the Bishop of Broome, prior having served as an Auxiliary Bishop of the Roman Catholic Archdiocese of Brisbane from 2022–2024. A member of the Society of the Divine Word, he previously served as the Provincial Superior of the order for Australia between 2005 and 2013.

== Early life ==
Norton was born in Sydney in 1958 to Joseph and Dawn Norton (née Spillane). He has an older brother Chris and a younger sister, Julie. He attended Marist Brothers Eastwood, where the school's chaplain was a Divine Word Missionary who had previously lived in India for 30 years. He took a trip to India during his final year of high school, which he later said was influential in discerning his vocation. After graduating, he commenced tertiary studies for a Bachelor of Applied Science in Physiotherapy at Cumberland College of Health Sciences, Sydney. He worked as a physiotherapist and worked with young street people in Darlinghurst who were experiencing homelessness, addiction, and mental health issues.

He entered the seminary when he was 25 and moved to Mexico to continue his studies at the age of 28. In 1985, he entered the Society of the Divine Word and in 1990, professed his final vows.

== Priesthood ==
Norton was ordinated a priest at St Kevins, Eastwood on 2 March 1991. Immediately following his ordination, he returned to Mexico City to serve as parish vicar until 1996. He became the director of the SILOAM Spiritual Programme between 1997 and 1998. He then served as head of formation and prefect of the Scholastics in Melbourne (1998-2000, 2002–2004) and director of the noviciate in Sydney (2001-2002).

From 2005 to 2013, Norton served as the Provincial Superior for Australia for the Society of the Divine Word. From 2014, until his episcopal appointment, he was the head of formation and director of the Ad Gentes Centre in Nemi, Italy.

== Episcopate ==
Norton was appointed Auxiliary Bishop of Brisbane by Pope Francis on 11 November 2021, and was given the titular see of Madaurus in Algeria. He was consecrated by Archbishop Mark Coleridge on 22 February 2022, in the Cathedral of St Stephen, Brisbane. On 14 October 2024, he was appointed as bishop of Broome by Pope Francis.
