= Patsch =

- Municipality
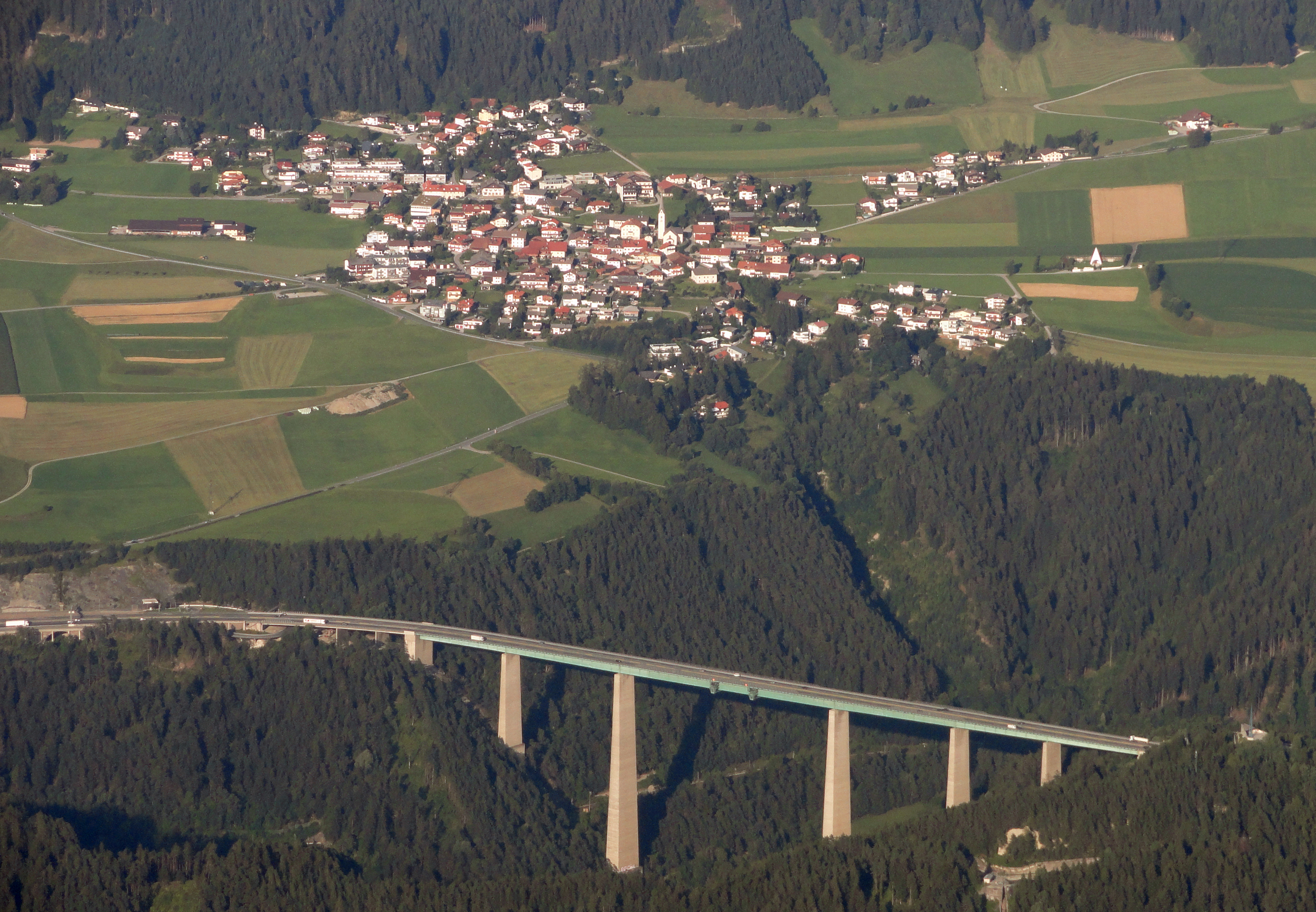

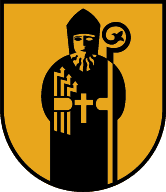
- Coat of arms

- Location within Austria
- Coordinates: 47°12′15″N 11°24′55″E
- Country: Austria
- State: Tyrol
- District: Innsbruck Land

Government
  - Mayor: Andreas Danler

Area
  - Total: 9.73 km^{2} (3.76 sq mi)
- Elevation: 896 m (2,940 ft)

Population (2021)
  - Total: 1,089
  - Density: 112/km^{2} (290/sq mi)
- Time zone: UTC+1 (CET)
  - Summer (DST): UTC+2 (CEST)
- Postal code: 6082
- Area code: 0512
- Vehicle registration: IL
- Website: www.patsch.tirol.gv.at

Patsch is a municipality in the district of Innsbruck-Land in the Austrian state of Tyrol located 6.7 km south of Innsbruck at the bottom of the Patscherkofel.

It is one of the oldest villages in the southern low mountain range around the capital and was mentioned in documents for the first time around 1200 as „Patsche or Pats“.

== Population ==
Historical population
Year	Pop.	±%
1869	538	—
1880	479	−11.0%
1890	467	−2.5%
1900	452	−3.2%
1910	562	+24.3%
1923	599	+6.6%
1934	553	−7.7%
1939	515	−6.9%
1951	620	+20.4%
1961	648	+4.5%
1971	701	+8.2%
1981	789	+12.6%
1991	826	+4.7%
2001	875	+5.9%
2011	1,013	+15.8%
