= Diocese of Sale =

Catholic ecclesiastical territory

Diocese of Sale Dioecesis Saliensis

Location
- Country: Australia
- Territory: South Eastern and Gippsland regions of Victoria
- Coordinates: 38°06′40″S 147°03′47″E

Statistics
- Area: 44,441 km^{2} (17,159 sq mi)
- Population: Total; Catholics: (as of 2004); ▲372,979; ▲92,746 (▲24.9%)
- Parishes: ▼25

Information
- Denomination: Catholic
- Sui iuris church: Latin Church
- Rite: Roman Rite
- Established: 10 May 1887
- Cathedral: St Mary's Cathedral

Current leadership
- Pope: Leo XIV
- Bishop: Gregory Bennet

Map

Website
- sale.catholic.org.au

The Roman Catholic Diocese of Sale is a suffragan diocese of the Archdiocese of Melbourne, that covers the south east of Victoria, Australia. The diocese was established in 1887.

Gregory Bennet was appointed bishop of Sale on 27 June 2020.

== History ==
The Diocese of Sale was established by Pope Leo XIII on 26 April 1887. The first bishop of the Diocese, James Francis Corbett, was a priest of the Diocese of Limerick, Ireland, who was responsible for the Mission (later Parish) of St Kilda and Chancellor of the Archdiocese of Melbourne at the time of his appointment. Corbett was consecrated bishop on 25 August 1887 in St Mary's Church, East St Kilda, by Archbishop of Melbourne, Thomas Carr. Bishop Corbett consecrated St Patrick's Cathedral, Melbourne, on account of his superior vocal ability.

The second Bishop of Sale, Patrick Phelan, saw to the establishment of a school system in the Diocese. The fourth bishop, Patrick Lyons, saw the 1959 change to the boundaries of the Diocese, which incorporated into Sale from the Melbourne Archdiocese the parishes of Berwick, Cranbourne, Pakenham, Iona, Maryknoll, Koo Wee Rup, Dalyston and Korrumburra. These parishes, while they were mainly rural areas at the time, have seen rapid growth and are now considered outer suburbs of the Melbourne metropolitan area.

== Bishops ==
=== Ordinaries ===
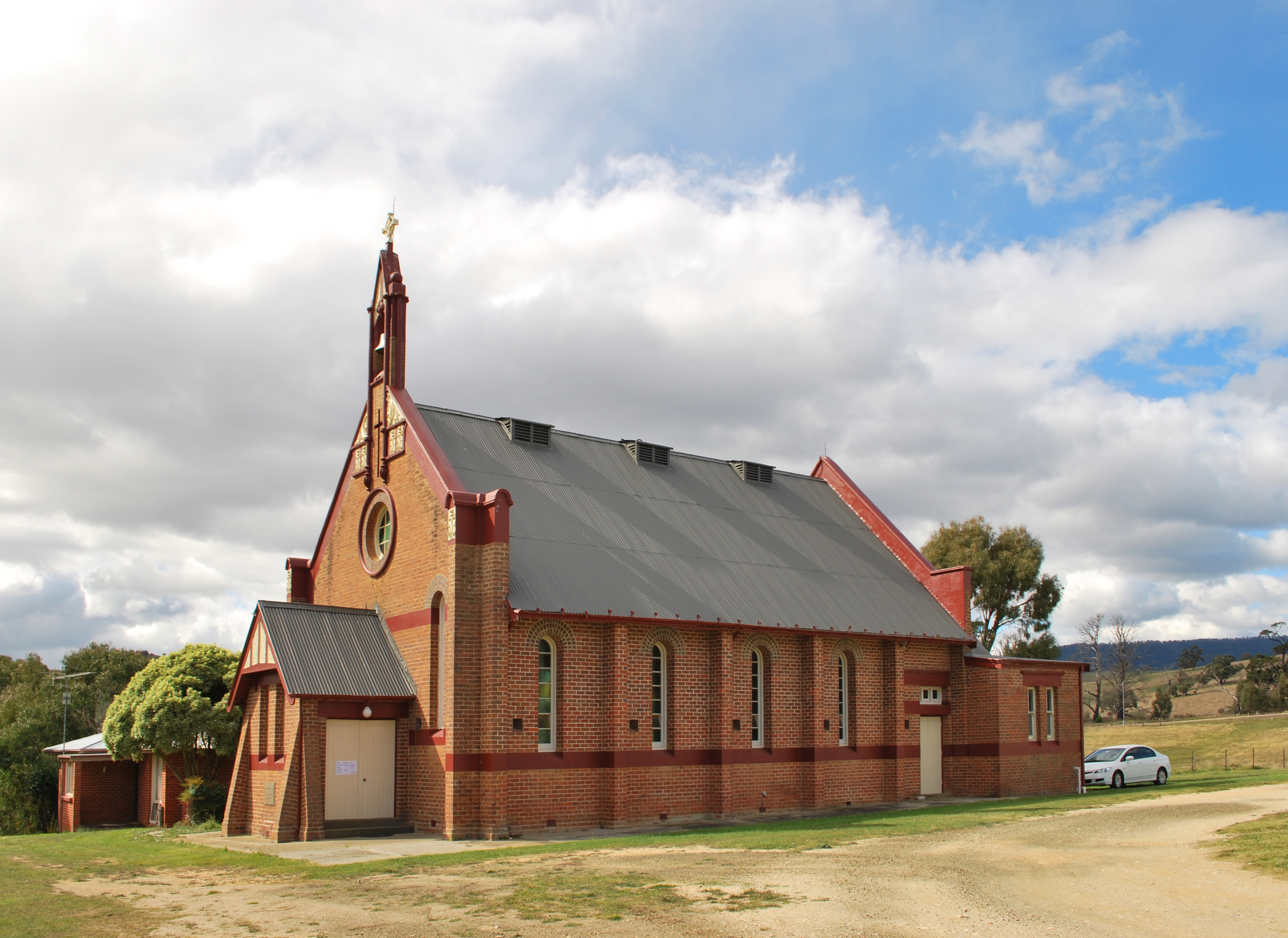
Church of the Immaculate Conception at Omeo; consecrated in 1903

The following individuals have served as Roman Catholic Bishop of Sale:

Order	Name	Date enthroned	Reign ended	Term of office	Reason for term end
1	James Francis Corbett	13 May 1887	29 May 1912	25 years, 16 days	Died in office
2	Patrick Phelan	2 November 1912	5 January 1925	12 years, 64 days	Died in office
3	Richard Ryan C.M.	10 March 1926	16 June 1957	31 years, 98 days	Died in office
4	Patrick Lyons	16 June 1957	13 August 1967	10 years, 58 days	Died in office
5	Arthur Fox	29 November 1967	25 February 1981	13 years, 88 days	Retired and appointed Bishop Emeritus of Sale
6	Eric D'Arcy	25 February 1981	24 October 1988	7 years, 242 days	Elevated to Archbishop of Hobart
7	Jeremiah Coffey	8 April 1989	2 January 2008	18 years, 269 days	Retired and appointed Bishop Emeritus of Sale
8	Christopher Prowse	18 June 2009	19 November 2013	4 years, 154 days	Appointed Archbishop of Canberra–Goulburn
9	Patrick O'Regan	26 February 2015	19 March 2020	10 years, 247 days	Appointed Archbishop of Adelaide
10	Gregory Bennet	8 December 2020	Incumbent	4 years, 327 days	

=== Coadjutor bishop ===
- Patrick Francis Lyons (1956–1957)

=== Other priests of this diocese who became bishops ===
- Patrick Mary O'Donnell, appointed Coadjutor Archbishop of Brisbane in 1948
- Noel Desmond Daly, appointed Bishop of Sandhurst in 1979
- Michael Joseph McKenna, appointed Bishop of Bathurst in 2009

== Cathedral ==
St Mary's Cathedral, Sale is the cathedral church of the diocese, under the patronage of Our Lady of Perpetual Help. Purpose-built as a cathedral, St Mary's boasts a Romanesque onyx high altar, notable stained glass windows and a large statue of Mary Help of Christians as its features. Four of Sale's bishops are buried in the cathedral: Bishop Corbett lies in the main section of the church beneath the front rows of pews on the right hand side and Bishops Ryan, Lyons and Fox are interred in the Lady Chapel.

== Boundaries ==
The diocese covers south east Victoria, from the eastern suburbs of Melbourne to the New South Wales border, including all of Gippsland.

== See also ==
- Catholic Church in Australia
