= Mission sui iuris of Kalumburu =

The Mission sui iuris of Kalumburu (originally Drysdale River) was a Roman Catholic missionary pre-diocesan jurisdiction in Western Australia from 1910 to 1980.

== History ==
It was established on 4 May 1910 as Mission sui juris of Drysdale River on territory split off from the Apostolic Vicariate of Kimberley in Western Australia. It was to remain exempt, i.e. directly subject to the Holy See, not part of any ecclesiastical province.

In 1971, it was renamed as Mission sui juris of Kalumburu.

In 1980 it was suppressed and its territory merged into the Roman Catholic Diocese of Broome.

== Ecclesiastical Superiors ==
(all from the same Latin congregation)

Ecclesiastical Superiors of Drisdale River

- Fulgentius Torres (1910.05.04 – 1914.10.05), while Superior General of the Subiaco Cassinese Benedictine Congregation (O.S.B. Subl.); later Apostolic Administrator of the mother jurisdiction Apostolic Vicariate of Kimberley in Western Australia (Australia) (1910.05.05 – 1914.10.05) & Titular Bishop of Dorylæum (1910.05.10 – 1914.10.05)
- Apostolic Administrator Anselmo Federico Catalán, O.S.B. Subl. (1915.06.30 – 1951), while Abbot Ordinary of the Territorial Abbacy of New Norcia
- Apostolic Administrator Abbot Gregory Gomez, O.S.B. Subl. (1951.07.05 – 1971), while Abbot Ordinary of the Territorial Abbacy of New Norcia

Ecclesiastical Superior of Kalumburu

- Bernard Rooney, O.S.B. Subl. (1971–1980), part of his term already Abbot Ordinary of the Territorial Abbacy of New Norcia ([1974.03.19] 1974.03.31 – 1980.06.15)
