= St Mary's Cathedral, Sale =

Cathedral of the Roman Catholic Diocese of Sandhurst, Australia

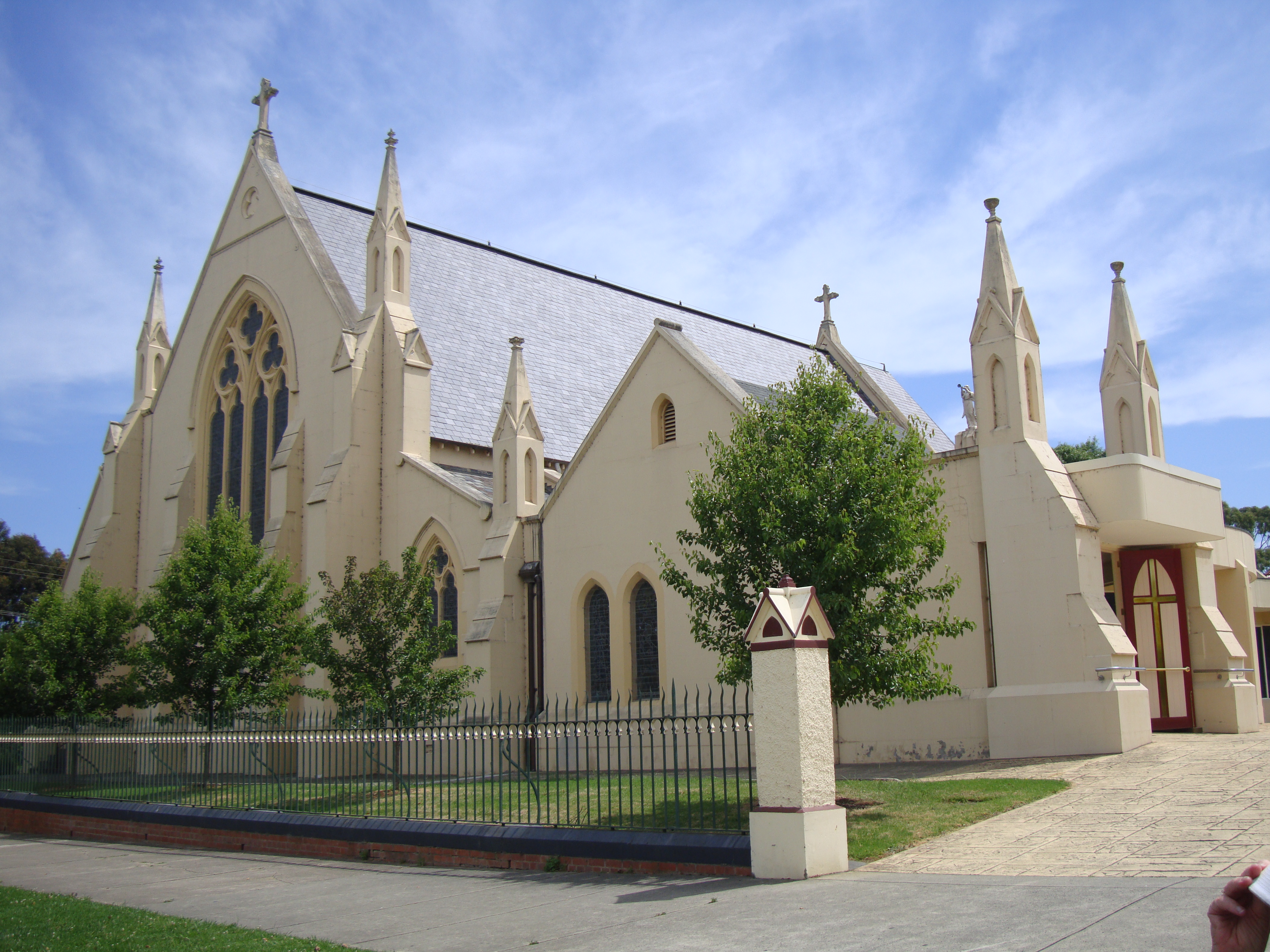
- St Mary's Cathedral in 2012
- St Mary's Cathedral, Sale
- 38°06′41″S 147°03′46″E
- Address: 47 Foster Street, Sale, East Gippsland, Victoria
- Country: Australia
- Denomination: Roman Catholic
- Website: stmaryscathedralsale.com.au

History
- Status: Cathedral
- Founded: 1886
- Founder: Fr James Hegarty
- Dedication: Our Lady of Perpetual Help
- Dedicated: 1910

Architecture
- Functional status: Active
- Heritage designation: National Trust of Australia (Victoria)
- Designated: 9 March 1989
- Architect(s): Barker and Henderson
- Architectural type: Church
- Style: Gothic Revival
- Years built: 1886 – 1877

Specifications
- Materials: Red brick, cement-faced

Administration
- Diocese: Sale
- Parish: Sale

Clergy
- Bishop: Gregory Bennet

St Mary's Cathedral is the Roman Catholic cathedral church of the Diocese of Sale and seat of Bishop Gregory Bennet. The cathedral is located in the provincial city of Sale, in the East Gippsland region of Victoria, Australia.

It was designed in the Gothic Revival style in 1886 by architects, Barker and Henderson. The cathedral was listed on the National Trust of Australia (Victoria) on 9 March 1989 as a place of regional significance.

An organ was installed to one side of the rear gallery and was first used in 1903.
