= St Francis Xavier's Cathedral, Geraldton =

St Francis Xavier's Cathedral
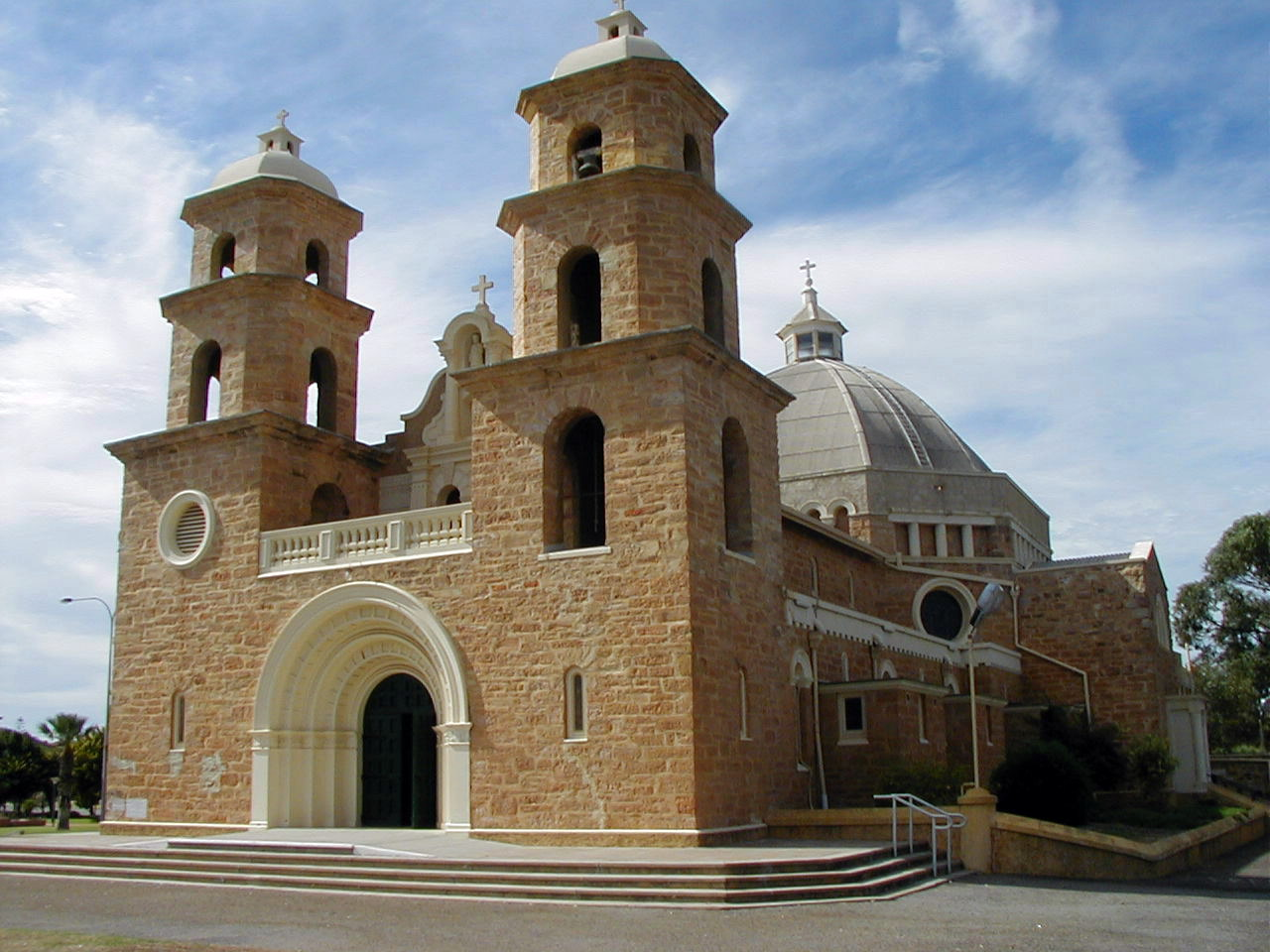

- Location within Western Australia
- 28°46′38.4″S 114°36′42.5″E
- Location: 7 Maitland St, Geraldton, Western Australia
- Country: Australia
- Denomination: Roman Catholic

History
- Founded: 20 June 1916
- Dedication: Saint Francis Xavier

Architecture
- Architect: John Hawes
- Years built: 1916 – 1938
- Completed: 1918 (Stage 1); 1926 (Stage 2); 1938 (Stage 3)

Administration
- Diocese: Geraldton

Clergy
- Bishop: Michael Henry Morrissey

Western Australia Heritage Register
- Designated: 10 October 1995
- Reference no.: 1064

St Francis Xavier's Cathedral or Geraldton Cathedral is a Roman Catholic cathedral in Geraldton, Western Australia. It is the seat of Bishop of Geraldton.

== History ==
Construction work on the cathedral began on 20 June 1916. The first phase ended with the construction of the nave and the twin towers, topped by two domes, and was completed in 1918. The second phase involved the construction of the crypt, sanctuary and Sisters' Chapel in 1926. The third and final phase, the dome, the transepts and the sacristy were completed and formally opened on 28 August 1938.

The cathedral is the largest and most imposing work of priest and architect, John Hawes.

In 1980-81 The first pipe organ was built for and installed in the Cathedral by F. J. Larner & Co., Perth. The organ was freestanding in the left chancel and featured polished Jarrah casework, Great above Swell with two flanking Pedal towers. There were two manuals and pedal in a reverse facing console, mechanical key action and electro-pneumatic stop action with 17 stops controlling 19 ranks and a total of 960 pipes in three divisions.

In 1997 a conservation plan was made for the cathedral, and later part of heritage assessment in 2000 the architect John Taylor assessed the structure and components of the cathedral.

Between 2015 and 2017 a A$10 million restoration, conservation, and enhancement project was undertaken.

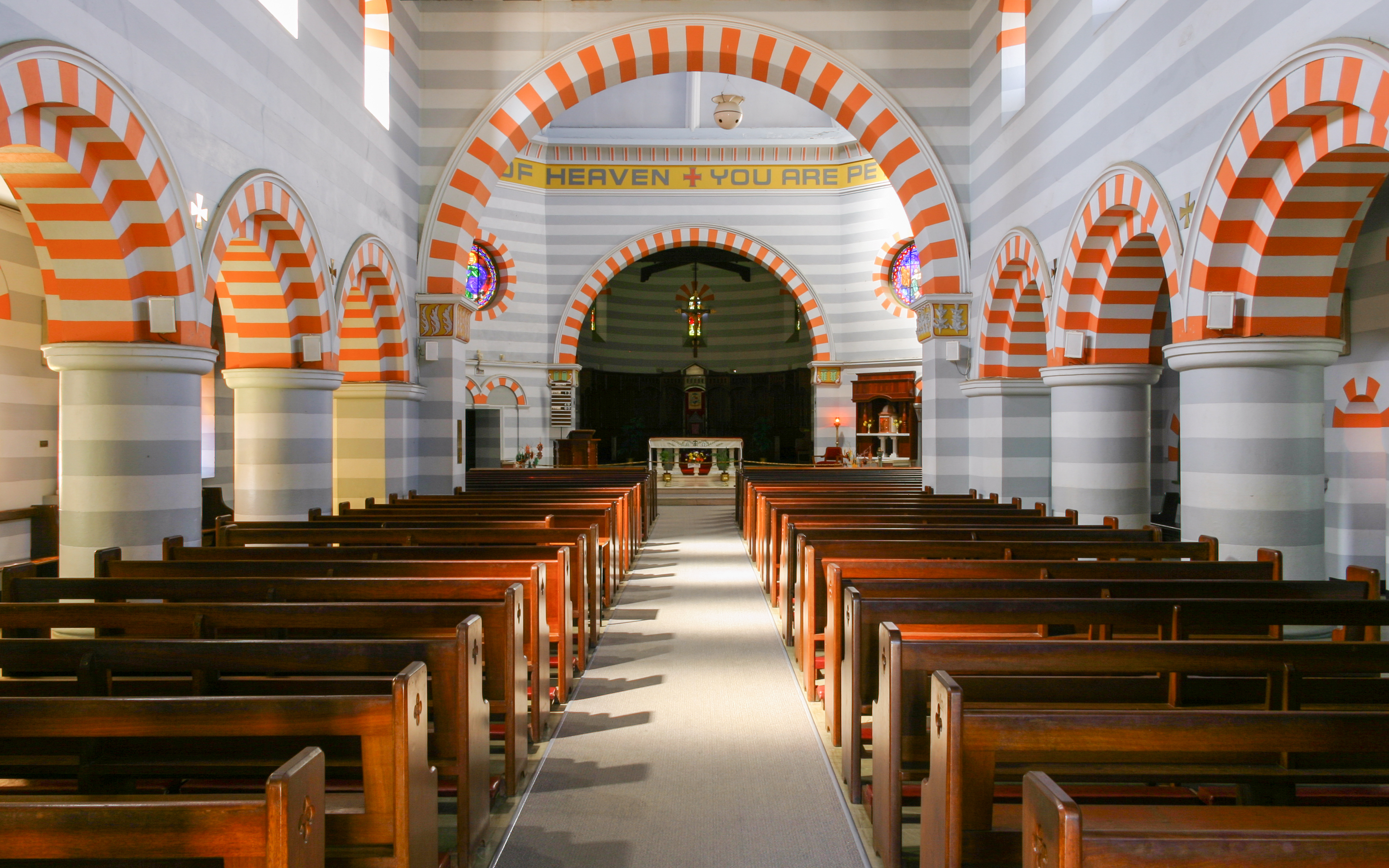
The Mosque–Cathedral of Córdoba served as the inspiration for the painting of the interior arches.

== Pipe organ ==
In 2017 the pipe organ was completely rebuilt by Pipe Organs WA Pty Ltd, with John Larner acting as tonal director. The new organ completely subsumed the first instrument and was divided into two sections: the Gallery Organ and the Cantoris (North Transept) Organ. Control of the instrument was by a new three (3) manual mobile console and two (2) manual gallery console, this being the previous mechanical action console of the Larner organ. The new organ has 27 stops, 24 ranks and 1,328 pipes.

Stoplist of the organ is:
| GREAT | | |
| Principal | 8' | 56 new |
| Rohr Flute | 8' | |
| Principal | 4' | |
| Harmonic Flute | 4' | 56 new |
| Twelfth | 2-2/3' | |
| Fifteenth | 2' | |
| Fourniture | IV | 224 new |
| Trompette | 8' | 56 new |
| SWELL | | |
| Hohl Flute | 8' | |
| Gemshorn | 8' | |
| Celeste | 8' | 44 new |
| Spitz Flute | 4' | |
| Flagelot | 2' | |
| Quintlein | 1-1/3' | |
| Oboe | 8' | |
| Tremulant | | |
| PEDAL | | |
| Subbass | 16' | |
| Principal | 8' | Great |
| Flute bass | 8' | |
| Fifteenth | 4' | |
| Bassoon | 16' | |
| CANTORIS | | |
| Principal | 8' | |
| Stopped Diapason | 8' | 56 recycle A |
| Dolce | 8' | 56 new |
| Celeste | 8' | 44 new |
| Principal | 4' | 56 new |
| Trompette | 8' | Great |
| CANTORIS PEDAL | | |
| Sub Bass | 16' | 12 new A |

Since the organ was completed the Cathedral commissioned an automatic carillon, which was subsequently installed in the western towers in 2019. The 27 bells range in size from 40 kilograms to one tonne. They were made by the foundry of John Taylor & Co, Loughborough, United Kingdom. Eight of the bells were obtained from the parish church of Saints Peter and Paul in Godalming, England, and were tuned down to form the lower tones and semi-tones. Nineteen new bells were cast to complete the carillon. The bells are tuned to modern concert pitch and are sounded by electro-magnetic hammers. Three of the largest bells are hung for slow swinging and are swung by electric motor.

The carillon is played from the organ consoles and can also be played through the internet from anywhere in the world. The bells are programmed to ring the quarter hours between 8am and 6pm every day. They can play specific tunes for weddings, funerals and baptisms as well as birthday or other community events. The Apollo control unit will also play hymns and tunes at various times throughout the day as well as the anthem of any country celebrating a National Day. English change ringing can also be programmed.

This is the only carillon and operating system of its type in the Southern Hemisphere and is said to be Australia's largest church carillon.

== Gallery ==
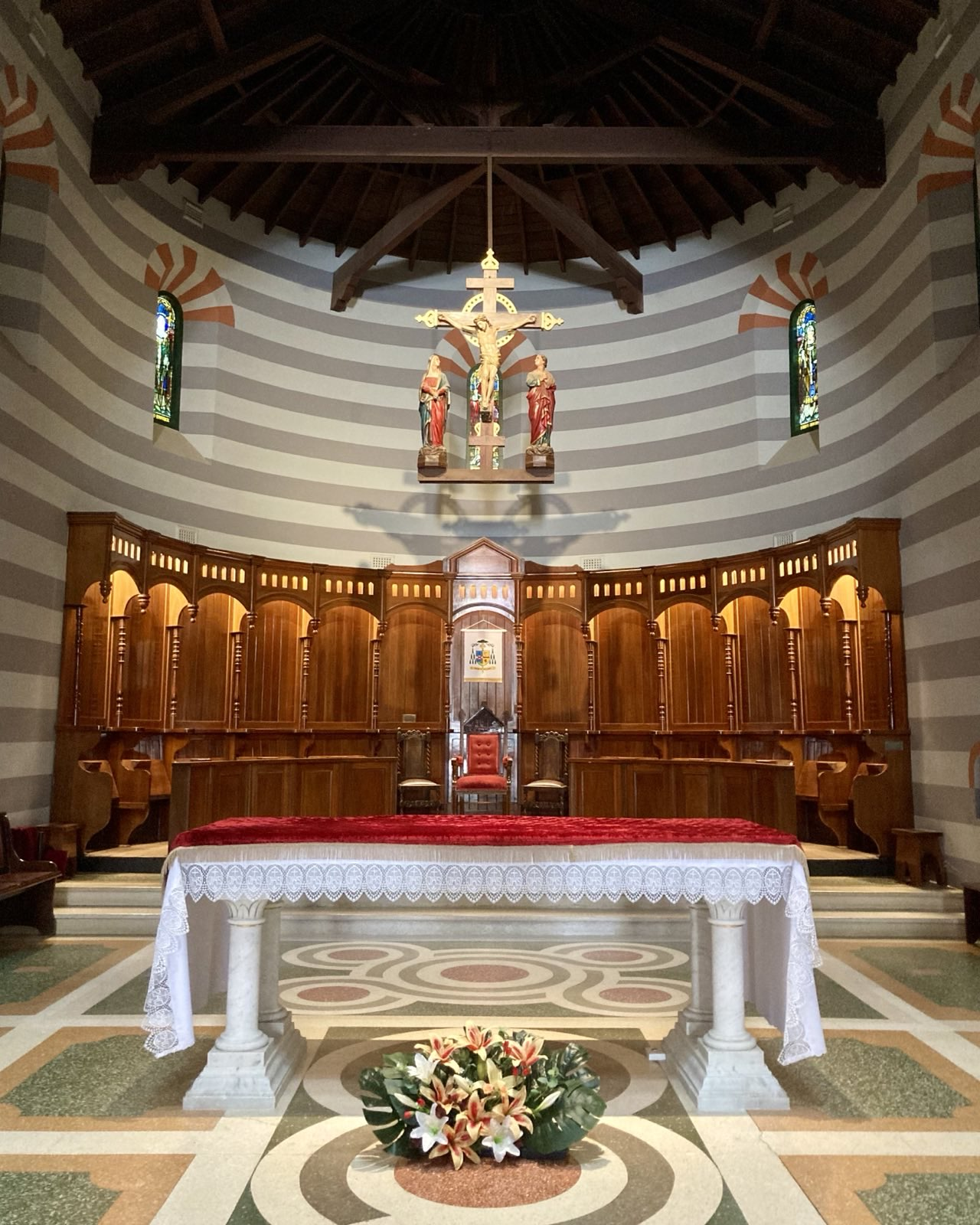
View of the altar and apse.

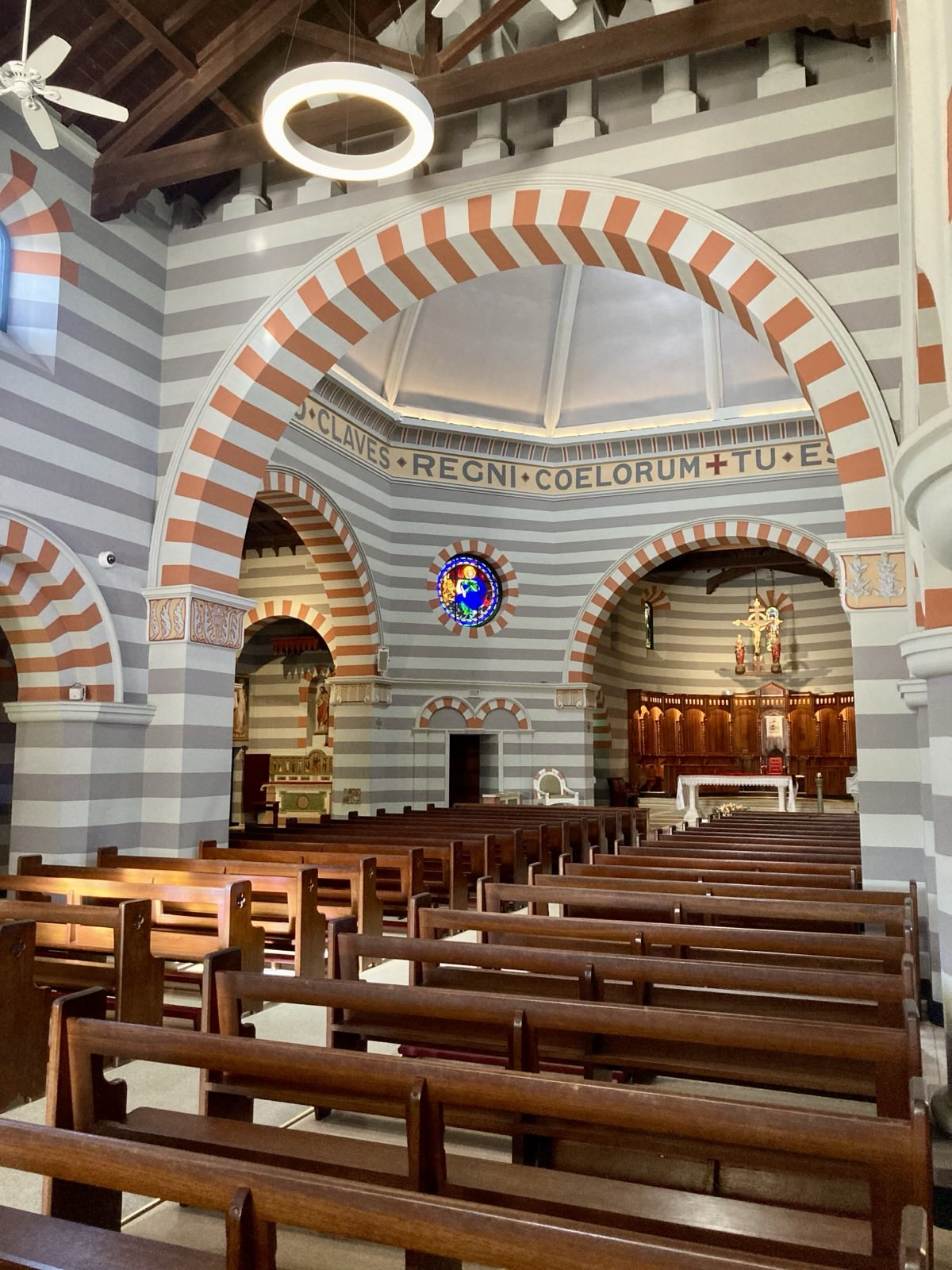
Interior view from the nave.

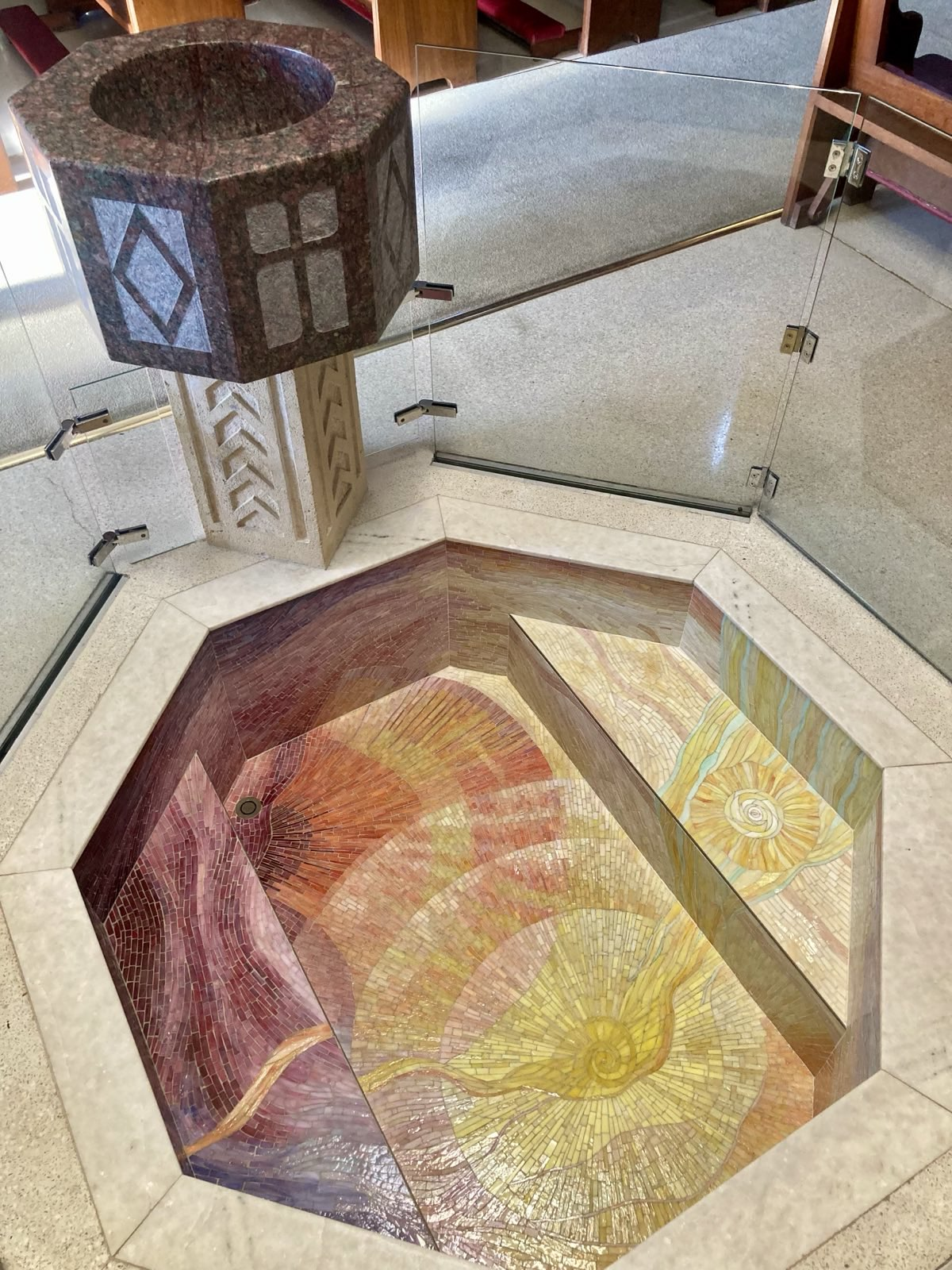
Baptismal font.

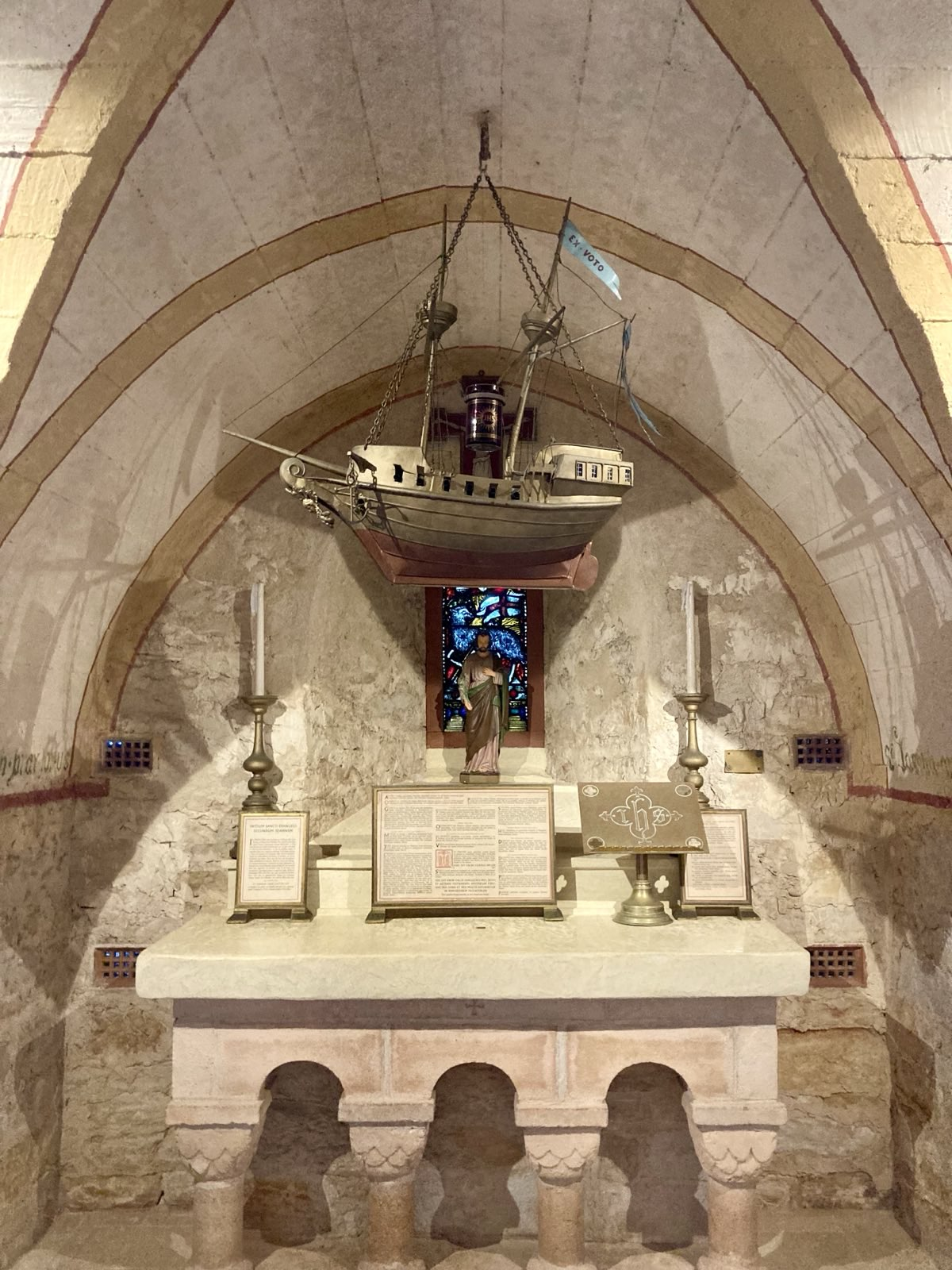
Altar within the crypt

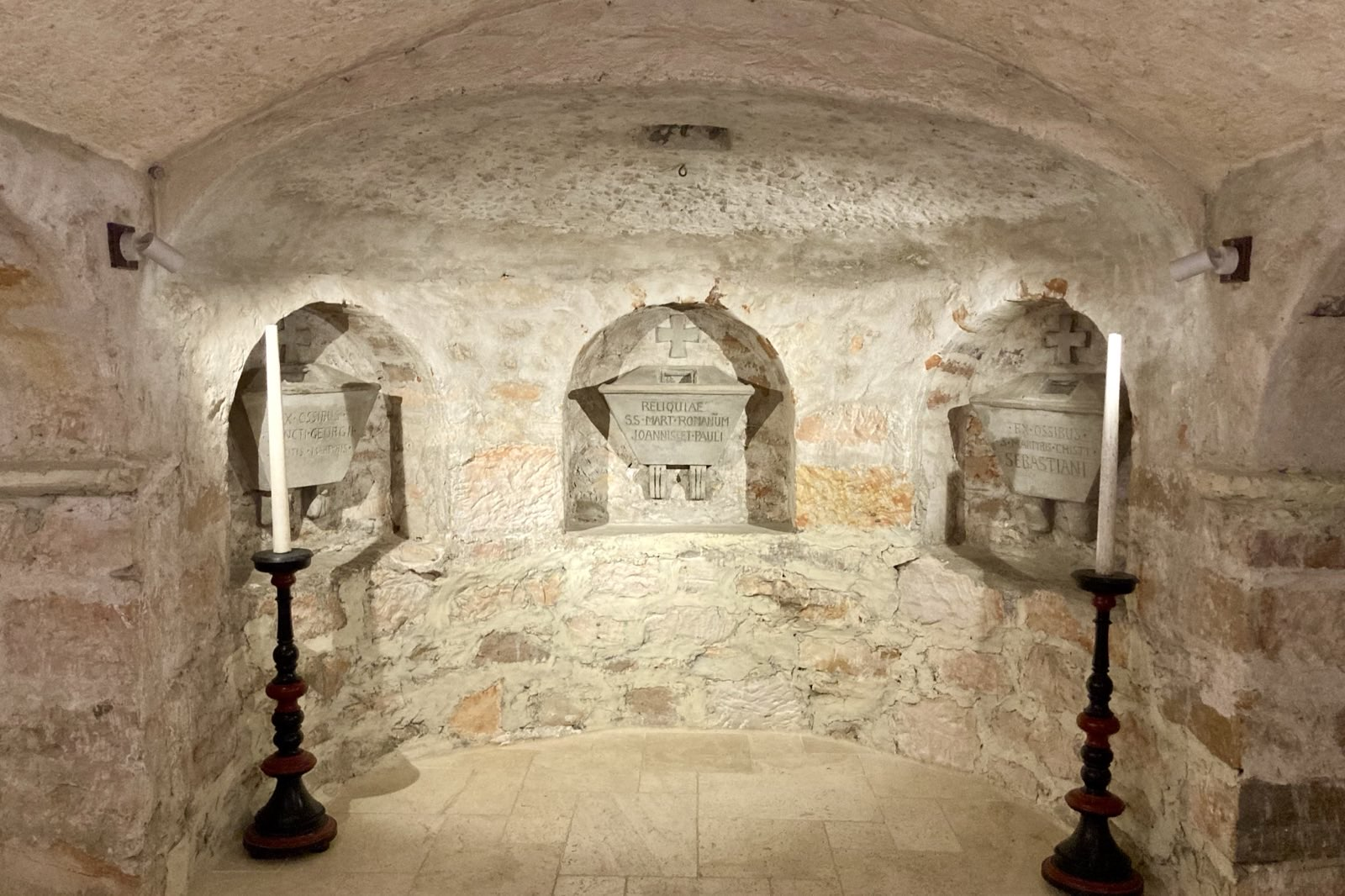
Reliquaries within the crypt.

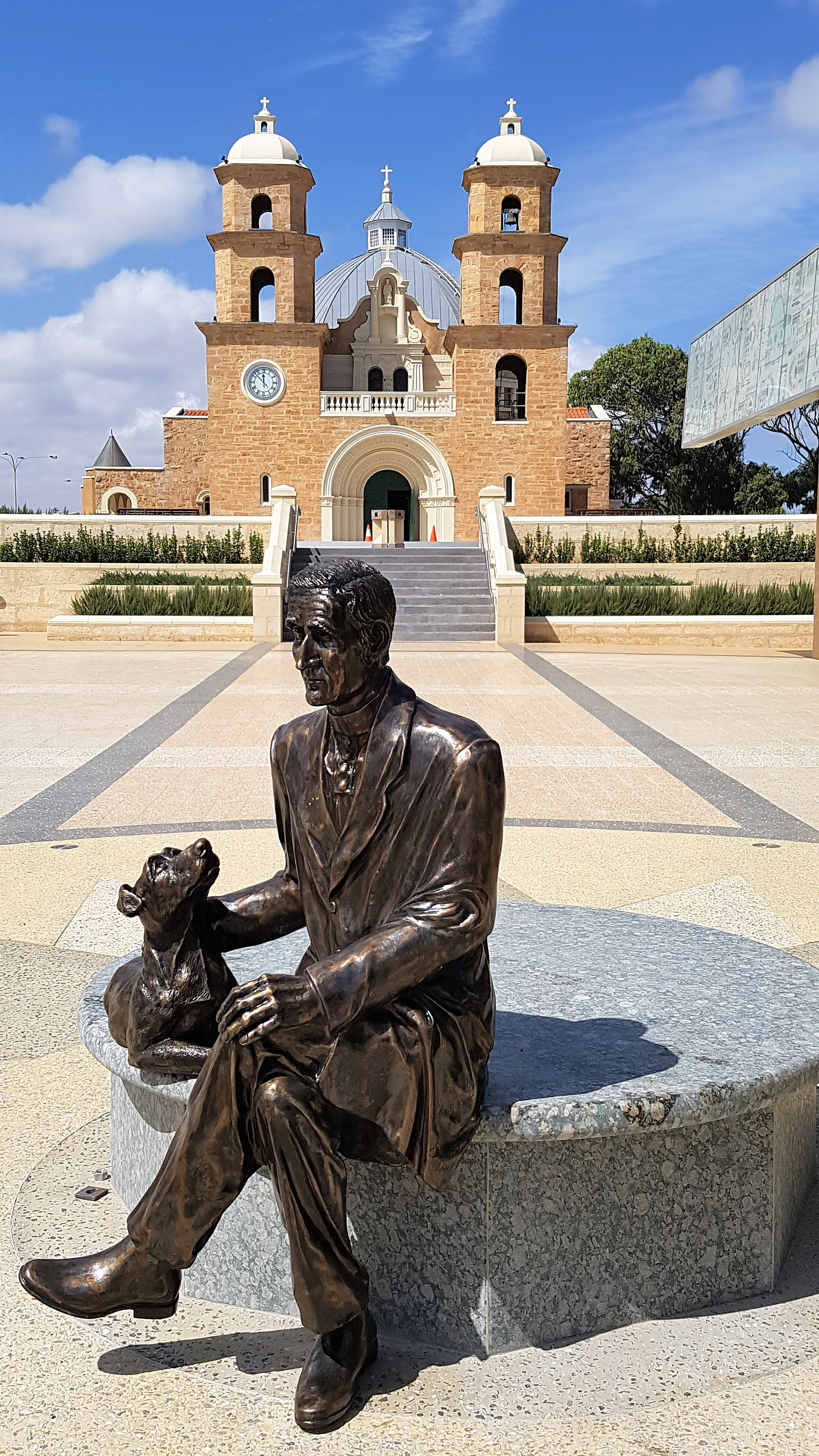
View of Cathedral from Monsignor Hawes Heritage Centre Plaza with the statue of Hawes

== See also ==
- Roman Catholicism in Australia
- St. Francis Xavier's Cathedral
