= St Monica's Cathedral =

Latin Catholic cathedral in Australia

St Monica's Cathedral, Cairns
- St Monica's War Memorial Cathedral
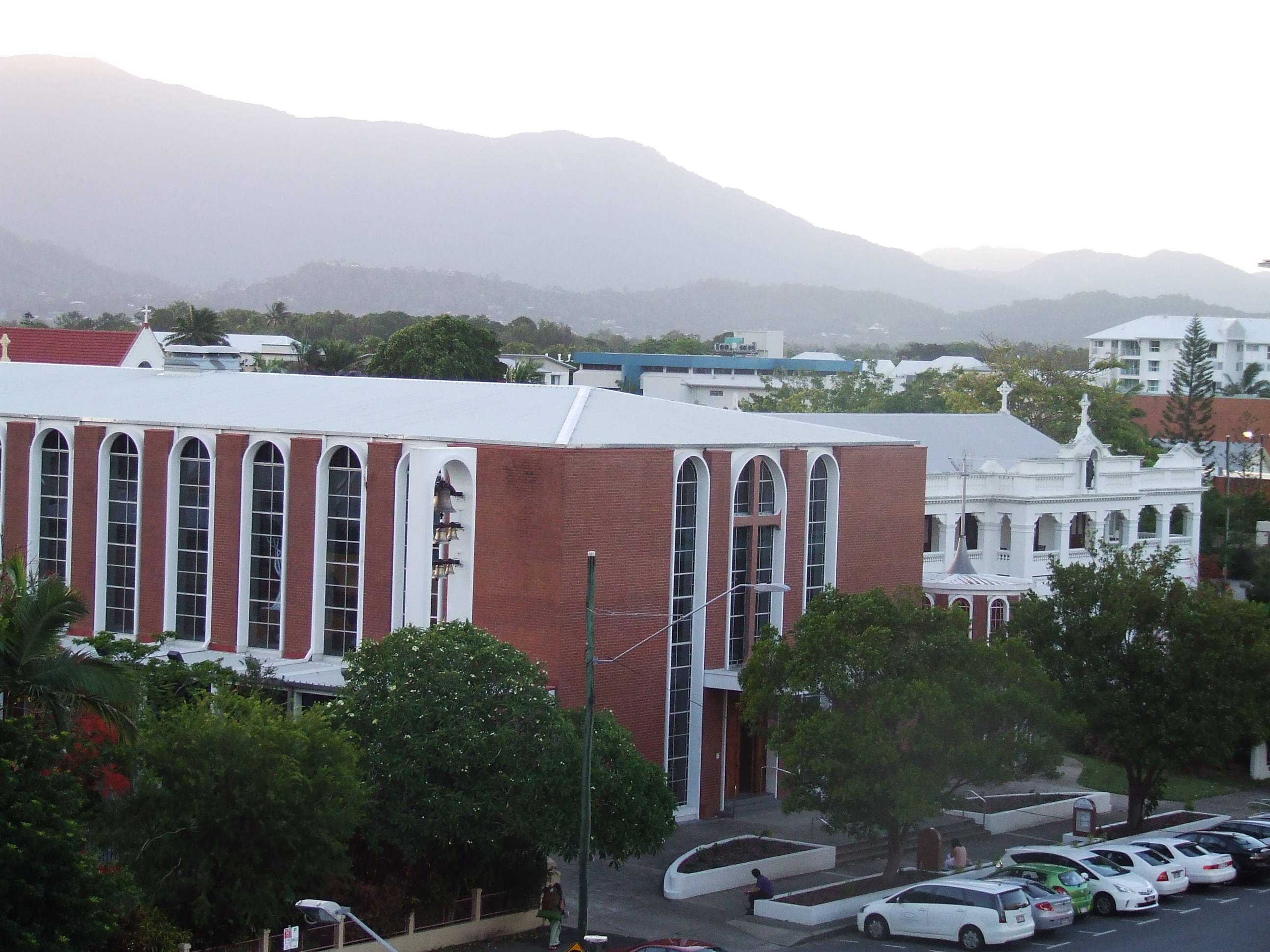
- St Monica's War Memorial Cathedral, 2013
- St Monica's Cathedral, Cairns
- 16°55′02″S 145°46′21″E
- Address: 183 Abbott Street, Cairns City, Cairns, Cairns Region, Queensland
- Country: Australia
- Denomination: Catholic Church
- Website: cairns.catholic.org.au/about/st-monicas-cathedral

History
- Status: Cathedral
- Founded: 28 May 1967
- Dedication: A memorial to the Battle of the Coral Sea
- Consecrated: 8 July 1968

Architecture
- Architect: Ian Ferrier
- Architectural type: Church
- Style: New formalism
- Years built: 1967–1968
- Construction cost: A$300,000

Specifications
- Materials: Reinforced concrete; brick

Administration
- Diocese: Cairns

Clergy
- Bishop: Joe Caddy

Queensland Heritage Register
- Official name: St Monica's War Memorial Cathedral
- Type: State heritage (built)
- Designated: 31 August 1998
- Reference no.: 601961
- Significant period: 1960s (historical); 1960s (fabric) ongoing (social)
- Significant components: Views to, furniture/fittings, stained glass window/s, cathedral, memorial – cathedral, baptistry

St Monica's Cathedral (also known as St Monica's War Memorial Cathedral) is the cathedral of the Catholic Church in the Diocese of Cairns. It is located at 183 Abbott Street, Cairns City, Cairns, Queensland, Australia. The cathedral was designed by Ian Ferrier and built from 1967 to 1968. It was added to the Queensland Heritage Register on 31 August 1998.

The cathedral serves as the seat for the Bishop of Cairns, currently Joe Caddy.

== History ==
St Monica's War Memorial Cathedral, dedicated as a memorial to the Battle of the Coral Sea, was constructed in 1967–68. The cathedral is surrounded by the Old Cathedral, Bishop's House, St Joseph's Convent and St Monica's High School Administration Building, which together form a highly intact ecclesiastical group. St Monica's War Memorial Cathedral is the only Cathedral in Cairns, as the seat of the Anglican bishops in the region was Thursday Island, for the Diocese of Carpentaria, until it was incorporated into the Diocese of North Queensland centred in Townsville.

Cairns was established in October 1876, as a port to service the Hodgkinson goldfields. In the same year the area from Cardwell to Cape York was separated from the Roman Catholic Diocese of Brisbane as the Pro-Vicariate of North Queensland. In 1884 three Irish Augustinian fathers took charge of the pro-vicariate, establishing a priory at Cooktown, and in 1885 they founded the parish of St Monica's at Cairns. An acre of land bounded by Abbott, Minnie and Lake Streets was acquired and the first St Monica's Church, a timber building at the corner of Abbott and Minnie Streets, was opened on 10 January 1886. A school fronting Minnie Street opened at the beginning of the 1890 school year - staffed initially by lay teachers, but from October 1892 by Sisters of Mercy from St Mary's Convent in Cooktown, who established a foundation in Cairns. In 1906, the Vicar Apostolic of Cooktown moved his residence to Cairns, which had eclipsed Cooktown as the principal port of Far North Queensland, and at this time St Monica's Church acquired the status of Pro-Cathedral.

The first St Monica's church and school were destroyed in the cyclone of 9 February 1927. Plans for a cathedral had to be abandoned as appeals were launched locally and in southern dioceses for reconstruction funds. Lawrence and Lordan, architects of Cairns, designed a building to function as both church and school. In the interim, mass was held at the Palace Picture Theatre, and the convent school was conducted at the Irish Association's Hibernian Hall.

Tenders for the new church-school at the corner of Minnie and Lake Streets were called in March 1927. The large reinforced concrete building, which seated 900, was officially opened on 16 October 1927 and cost nearly £9,000 to erect. The ground floor contained the school, and the upper storey housed the church, including the altar from the first St Monica's Church.

The construction of this church-school illustrated the strength of the Catholic Church in the Cairns district in the 1920s. The effects of the February 1927 cyclone, followed almost immediately by flood damage, a severe trade depression, and waterfront disputes affecting the city's building industry, did not deter the predominantly working- class Catholic community of Cairns from raising within eight months nearly £5,000 toward the re-construction.

On 8 July 1941 the Vicariate Apostolic of Cooktown was raised to the status of Diocese of Cairns with Fr John Heavey (Vicar Apostolic since 1914) as the first Bishop of Cairns. At this time St Monica's Church became St Monica's Cathedral, and imposing front stairs were added to the Minnie Street facade c. 1948.

Bishop Heavey, the last bishop of the Augustinian Order in the Cairns Diocese, died in June 1948 and was succeeded by the Most Rev. Thomas Cahill. Bishop Cahill began the changeover to an administration conducted by the diocesan clergy, and from this point the number of Augustinian priests in the area declined. The majority of new priests who arrived were Queenslanders who had studied for the priesthood at Banyo Seminary, Brisbane. Bishop Cahill began extending functions and procedures in the area now that it was a diocese and no longer "missionary territory". In 1951 he welcomed the Sisters of the Little Company of Mary to Cairns, who later opened Calvary Hospital, and the Bethlehem Home for the Aged was opened by the Sisters of Mercy in 1967.

In 1958, the means of fund raising for St Monica's parish passed from the voluntary work of organisations and offerings in the Sunday collection, to the more organised scheme of "planned giving". This enabled the parish to plan ahead financially and borrow funds accordingly for particular projects. The scheme of "planned giving" was adopted throughout Queensland, and was an important contributing factor which enabled the construction and adaptation of a large number of churches during the 1950–60s to accommodate the post Second World War increase in population, and later to reflect changes mandated by the Second Vatican Council decree on the liturgy.

The construction of St Monica's War Memorial Cathedral was one of the major achievements of Bishop Cahill's episcopate. Bishop Cahill, however, never presided in the new cathedral as Bishop of Cairns. He was appointed Archbishop of Canberra-Goulburn Archdiocese, prior to the completion of St Monica's War Memorial Cathedral, where he remained until his death in 1976. He was also appointed to the Chair of the Episcopal Liturgical Commission. The Most Rev. John Torpie became Bishop of Cairns in 1967.

Brisbane architect Ian Ferrier was commissioned in 1965 to design the new cathedral, having also designed cathedrals in Darwin and Port Moresby, both of which have strong references to the indigenous culture of their particular regions.

Ian Ferrier designed many projects for the Catholic Church throughout Queensland during his career. He graduated in architecture from McGill University, Canada, in 1952 and came to Australia in 1953 where he spent two years working in Sydney. He moved to Brisbane in 1955 to work for architect Jack Donoghue. In 1957 he received substantial commissions which enabled him to establish his own practice. Early commissions were mainly in the fields of education, health and ecclesiastical architecture, and throughout his career Ian Ferrier designed some 25 churches and chapels, as well as the cathedrals of Cairns, Darwin and Port Moresby. Ian Ferrier also played an active role in the affairs of his profession, and in 1980 became National President of the Royal Australian Institute of Architects. He was awarded the Board of Architects of Queensland inaugural Architect of the Year award in 1995, and retired from practice in 1996. Ian Ferrier also designs the coat of arms for Catholic bishops in Queensland, including the Bishop of Cairns, as well as interstate bishops, universities and municipalities.

Bishop Cahill attended the Second Vatican Council, 1961–65, at which the public worship of the Catholic Church was subject to substantial revision after a period of approximately 450 years of rigidity. St Monica's War Memorial Cathedral was designed to reflect materially the changes mandated by the Second Vatican Council's decree on the liturgy, and it is thought that it may be one of the earliest cathedrals designed in an attempt to reflect these changes. Of particular note are the following:

- the altar is free standing so that the celebrant may face the people
- in place of the high altar is the bishop's chair
- the Blessed Sacrament is reserved in a small private prayer chapel to the side

The baptistery is a separate structure with a circular plan attached to the northern side of the narthex, and symbolises baptism as the sacrament of entry to the church in the tradition of the Italian Cathedrals such as Pisa, Florence and Sienna. The baptistery does not reflect the changes mandated by the Second Vatican Council as the Baptismal Rites Latin edition was not produced until 1969, and the English edition in 1971. Similarly, a choir loft was constructed above the narthex, which pre-dated the changes mandated concerning the role of the choir and music in the celebration of the mass.

St Monica's War Memorial Cathedral follows the basic form of the original basilica model of the early Latin churches. Bishop Cahill requested the architect to design the cathedral with arches as a major design element; however, Ian Ferrier has said that he found it a challenge to reconcile the use of arches whilst designing in the modernist idiom. He developed a system of reinforced concrete arches along either side of the cathedral, which house leadlight windows surmounting doors to side verandahs. The side arches were designed in concert with a vaulted ceiling; however, due to cost constraints, the vaulted ceiling was eliminated and a flat soffit erected in its place which internally obscures the top of the arch. The cathedral was constructed with a reinforced concrete frame, with inner and outer skins of brickwork, and the side verandahs were designed to allow the side doors to be left open, particularly during the wet season, to allow cross ventilation. The original design included transepts, which were deleted due to cost constraints; however, a section of the southern transept was retained as a side chapel. The original design of the cathedral also called for more extensive use of marble, particularly to the floors of the nave and sanctuary. The architect's original intention for the leadlight windows was to eventually house stained glass when funds permitted, but in the interim to use gold and light blue glass as per his design for the Sisters of Mercy St Bernard's College, Herberton. However, Bishop Cahill did not like the colour blue and requested that the windows be constructed with a field of burgundy red glass with an amber border. It was not until the glass was being installed that the enormous impact of the vast areas of burgundy red glass began to be felt. However, as the glass had been paid for and delivered to site, there was no option but to install it.

The foundation stone was laid on 28 May 1967, and the cathedral was consecrated on 8 July 1968 by the Most Rev. Cahill Archbishop of Canberra-Goulburn, and opened on 14 July 1968 by Cardinal Gilroy Archbishop of Sydney. The cathedral was dedicated as a memorial to the Battle of the Coral Sea which was fought due east of Cairns from 4–8 May 1942. The baptistery was dedicated to the memory of Patrick and Elizabeth Cahill. On completion of the new cathedral, the former St Monica's Cathedral ceased functioning as a church, and the bishop's chair was removed to the new cathedral. The decision to dedicate the cathedral as a war memorial was partly to access the provision of tax deductibility for donations to the building fund. The final cost of the cathedral was approximately $300,000.

Bishop Torpie retired in August 1985, and was succeeded by Bishop John Bathersby. The Most Rev. Dr James Foley became Bishop of Cairns in August 1992.

St Monica's bell was commissioned from M Byrne, bell-founder in Dublin, Ireland. A bell tower was constructed adjacent to the front of the original St Monica's church (demolished in the cyclone of 1927) and the bell was installed, consecrated and blessed in November 1902. Later the tower and bell were moved to the rear of the Bishop's House until the tower was demolished in 1982. The bell has now been installed at ground level in the grounds of the cathedral.

The bishop's chair is located behind the altar in the cathedral. The "Bishop's Throne" as it was known in ecclesiastical terms prior to September 1968 was presented to St Mary's Church, Cooktown by Mr Ambrose J Madden, a Cooktown merchant and businessman. The Vicar Apostolic of Cooktown moved his residence to Cairns in 1906, but it was not until 1940 that the Very Rev. Thomas Hunt suggested to Bishop John Heavey that the throne should be brought down to Cairns. At the end of that year, by the favour of Mr Charles Hayles Snr, the throne was shipped to Cairns. When the Diocese of Cairns was declared on 8 July 1941, and St Monica's became a cathedral, the throne was already installed. The chair was transferred to its current location in the new cathedral in 1968.

On Sunday 30 November 1969 the Colours of the 51st Infantry Battalion, the Far North Queensland Regiment, were put "to rest" on the wall in the sanctuary of the cathedral.

The "Peace Window", a triple arch window at the eastern entrance to the cathedral, was installed to coincide with the Victory in the Pacific celebrations in Far North Queensland, celebrating 50 years of peace in the Pacific, on 2 September 1995.

In 1998, the replacement of the burgundy red and amber glass in the 24 nave windows commenced. The glass is being replaced with stained/painted glass in a continuous design depicting the whole of Creation as written in the first chapters of Genesis. The artists for both the "Peace Window" and the Creation series are Gerry Cummins and Jill Stehn of Eumundi, Queensland.

== Description ==
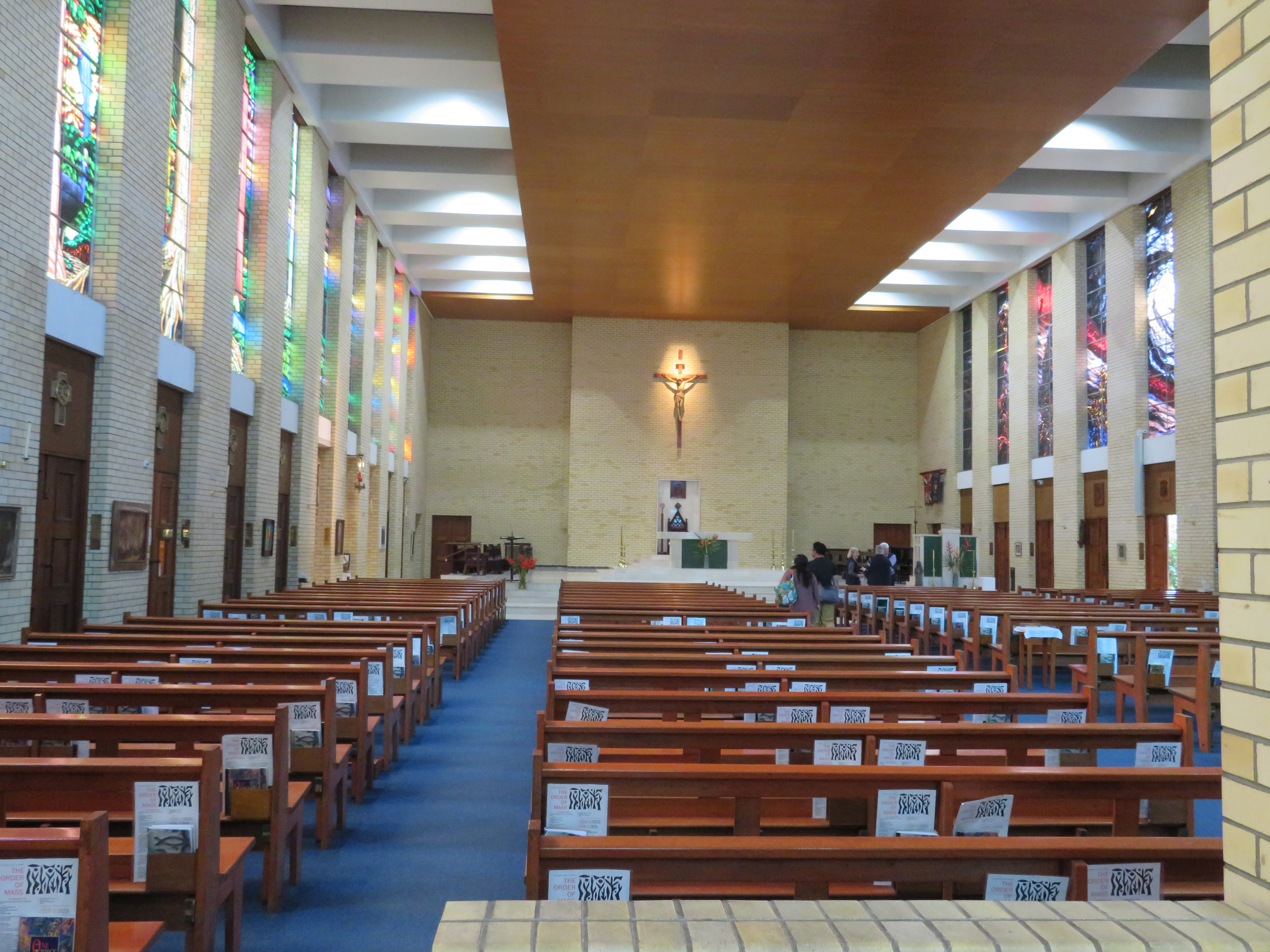
Interior of the cathedral

St Monica's War Memorial Cathedral is located fronting Abbott Street to the northeast, between the Bishop's House to the north and St Joseph's Convent to the south, within a highly intact ecclesiastical group.

In form, the cathedral consists of one large rectangular space of equal height which houses the narthex, choir gallery, nave and sanctuary. Single-storeyed side verandahs are partially enclosed in places to house a side chapel, confessionals, and entrance to the baptistery, with a single-storeyed vestry and sacristy structure at the rear of the sanctuary. The baptistery is a separate structure with a circular plan which is attached to the northern side of the narthex.

The cathedral has a reinforced concrete frame clad externally with red brickwork and internally with cream brickwork. The dominant external expression is of a large rectangular box articulated by regularly spaced reinforced concrete arched window units surmounted by reinforced concrete spandrel panels and separated by brick piers to parapet height concealing a shallow pitched hipped roof. A single-storeyed verandah with a deep fascia to a horizontal awning supported by concrete columns is located along either side of the cathedral.

The Abbott Street elevation comprises a wide central reinforced concrete arched window surmounting paired timber panelled entrance doors on which are housed the coat of arms of the previous bishops of Cairns. A cantilevered horizontal awning is located above the entrance doors covering a driveway, and the central window has a large reinforced concrete cross clad in ceramic tiles. The central window is flanked by brick piers with a narrower reinforced concrete arched window to either side. The three windows have been reglazed with stained/painted glass forming the commemorative "Peace Window". The Abbott Street elevation is framed by wide panels of brickwork to parapet height, which are flanked by the enclosed ends of the single- storeyed side verandahs each of which have a brickwork panel separated from the main body of the cathedral by a vertical strip of glazing. The enclosed end of the northern verandah forms the entrance to the baptistery.

The baptistery has a circular plan, and in elevation comprises narrow reinforced concrete arched window units surmounted by reinforced concrete spandrel panels and separated by brick piers. The baptistery has a shallow pitched roof with a central aluminium fleche which has a curved base and is surmounted by a cross.

Both sides of the cathedral comprise twelve reinforced concrete arched window units surmounted by reinforced concrete spandrel panels and separated by brick piers, with wider panels of brickwork at either end. Paired timber panelled doors surmounted by pivoting fanlights are located below each arched window and open from the nave and sanctuary onto the side verandahs. The fanlights are glazed to match the arched windows above. Three bays of the southern verandah are enclosed to form a side chapel adjacent to the sanctuary. This side chapel has five narrow reinforced concrete arched window units which are separated by brick piers. All windows in the cathedral were originally glazed with a burgundy red field and an amber border; however, the eastern windows and a number of the northern windows to the nave and sanctuary have been reglazed with stained/painted glass. Two sets of paired confessionals, which are the same height as the side doors and are surmounted by fanlights, are located on both side verandahs.

The rear of the cathedral has a single-storeyed structure which house the vestry and sacristy. It is designed to the same proportions as the side verandahs, and has narrow reinforced concrete arched windows at either end, and the rear wall has small regularly spaced rectangular windows. The rear wall of the sanctuary is face brick to parapet height.

Internally, the cathedral has an overwhelming red glow from the vast expanse of burgundy red glass in the windows. However, this is gradually being diminished with the replacement of the glass with stained/painted glass. The cathedral has a flat, plywood-sheeted ceiling which obscures the arched top of the side windows. The nave and sanctuary are within the one large space, with either side characterised by the regular rhythm of vertical windows surmounting paired doors (designed to be open for cross ventilation) separated by solid brick piers. A choir gallery is located above the narthex and is accessed via a narrow stair concealed behind a brick wall to either side of the entrance doors. The choir gallery has a brick balustrade with timber handrail, and stepped timber speakers/screens to either side. The gallery is supported by brick columns with low brick walls attached which separate the narthex from the nave and provide the entrance to the baptistery. The doors to the confessionals to either side of the nave are detailed to match the paired doors opening onto the side verandahs; however, these doors have a single leaf to each confessional and open inward.

The baptistery houses a central marble baptismal font, and is accessed via ornamental metal gates. The wall sections between the arched windows are clad with cream marbled vinyl tile.

The sanctuary comprises almost the same area as the nave and consists of a raised platform accessed via steps with marble treads and risers. A raised platform in the centre houses the altar, and another raised platform against the rear wall houses the bishop's chair and crosier which are set in a marble framed recess which is clad with marbled vinyl tiles and also has the bishop's coat of arms. Above this a large crucifix is fixed to the rear wall of the sanctuary. The vestry is accessed from the rear of the sanctuary either side of the bishop's chair, and also via paired timber panelled doors either side of the sanctuary. The side chapel is located to the south of the sanctuary, and has a marble framed recess clad with marbled vinyl tiles behind the side altar.

Cream Italian marble has been used for the altar, lectern, side altar, baptismal font, consecration stones, holy water fonts, treads and risers in the sanctuary and side chapel, and framing to the recess behind the bishop's chair and side chapel altar. The bishop's chair, crosier and coat of arms are of carved timber. Blonde timber has been used for the pews and handrail to the choir gallery.

The floors are finished with a pale green vinyl tile; however, much of the nave floor has been covered with a dark blue carpet. The floor of the sanctuary was finished with a cream marbled tile, which has also been covered with a cream carpet.

The bell from the original St Monica's church is located to the north of the cathedral. The bell is set in a low metal frame surmounting a memorial plaque.

== Heritage listing ==
St Monica's War Memorial Cathedral was listed on the Queensland Heritage Register on 31 August 1998 having satisfied the following criteria.

The place is important in demonstrating the evolution or pattern of Queensland's history.

St Monica's War Memorial Cathedral, constructed 1967–68, is significant as one of the earliest Cathedrals designed in an attempt to materially reflect the changes mandated by the Second Vatican Council's decree on the liturgy. After attending the Second Vatican Council, 1961–65, at which the public worship of the Catholic Church was subject to substantial revision after a period of approximately 450 years of rigidity, the Most Rev. Thomas Cahill Bishop of Cairns commissioned Brisbane architect Ian Ferrier to design the cathedral to reflect these changes. Bishop Cahill was appointed Archbishop of Canberra-Goulburn Arch-Diocese, prior to the completion of St Monica's War Memorial Cathedral, and was later appointed the Chair of the Australian Episcopal Liturgical Commission.

St Monica's War Memorial Cathedral follows the basic form of the original basilica model of the early Latin Christian churches. When commissioned to design the Cairns Cathedral, architect Ian Ferrier had designed the cathedrals of Darwin and Port Moresby, and during his career designed many projects for the Catholic Church throughout Queensland, including some 25 churches and chapels, as well as the coat of arms of the bishops of Queensland.

St Monica's War Memorial Cathedral is an integral member of a highly intact ecclesiastical group which includes the Old Cathedral, Bishop's House, St Joseph's Convent and St Monica's High School Administration Building, located on a site which has had a strong association with the Catholic community of the region since the Irish Augustinian fathers founded the parish of St Monica in 1885. The cathedral has had a close association with Catholic worship since its construction, and as the only Cathedral in Cairns (as the seat of the Anglican bishops is the Diocese of North Queensland centred in Townsville) St Monica's War Memorial Cathedral has performed an important role as a venue for major religious and civic functions.

The dedication of the cathedral as a war memorial enabled donations to the building fund to be tax deductible. The introduction of the scheme of "planned giving" in St Monica's parish in 1958 enabled the parish to plan ahead financially and borrow funds accordingly for particular projects. This scheme was adopted throughout Queensland and was an important contributing factor which enabled the construction and adaptation of a large number of churches during the 1950–60s to accommodate post Second World War increases in population, and later to reflect changes mandated by the Second Vatican Council decree on the liturgy.
