= Saint Monica's Church =

Saint Monica's Church may refer to:

In Australia

- St Monica's Catholic Church (Moonee Ponds), Melbourne, Victoria

In the United Kingdom

- Church of St. Monica, Bootle, Merseyside

In the United States

- Saint Monica's Church, Barre, Vermont
- St. Monica Catholic Church (Santa Monica, California)
- St. Monica's Church (Queens, New York), New York
- St. Monica's Church (Manhattan), New York City

== See also ==
- St Monica's Cathedral, Cairns, Queensland, Australia
  - St Monica's Old Cathedral, Cairns
