= St Joseph's Convent, Cairns =

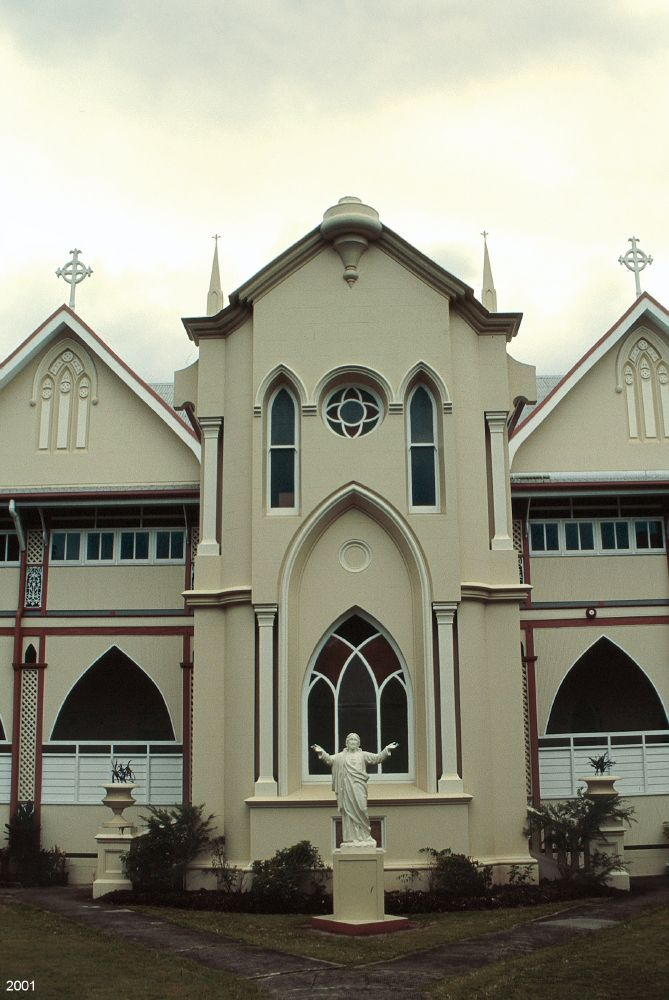
- St Joseph's Convent, 2001

- Location within Queensland
- Interactive map of St Joseph's Convent, Cairns

Monastery information
- Order: Sisters of Mercy
- Denomination: Roman Catholic
- Dedication: Saint Joseph
- Dedicated: 22 March 1914 by Bishop James Duhig
- Diocese: Cairns

People
- Founders: Bishop James Murray, Vicar Apostolic of Cooktown

Architecture
- Architect: Edward Gregory Waters
- Style: Gothic Revival

Site
- Location: 179 Abbott Street, Cairns City, Cairns, Cairns Region, Queensland
- Country: Australia
- Coordinates: 16°55′02″S 145°46′22″E

Designations

Queensland Heritage Register
- Official name: St Joseph's Convent
- Type: State heritage (built, landscape)
- Designated: 1 July 1997
- Reference no.: 601749
- Significant period: 1910s–1920s (historical) ongoing (social)
- Significant components: Garden/grounds, furniture/fittings, trees/plantings, gate – entrance, convent/nunnery, views to, fencing
- Builders: Wilson & Baillie

St Joseph's Convent is a heritage-listed convent at 179 Abbott Street, Cairns City, Cairns, Cairns Region, Queensland, Australia. It was designed by Edward Gregory Waters and built from 1912 to 1914 by Wilson & Baillie. It was added to the Queensland Heritage Register on 1 July 1997.

== History ==
St Joseph's Convent was constructed in 1912–14 for the Sisters of Mercy, who had established a foundation in Cairns in 1892. The 1914 building replaced two earlier cottage convents. The impetus for construction of a new convent came from Bishop James Murray, Vicar Apostolic of Cooktown 1898–1914. Construction of St Joseph's Convent at Cairns was considered one of his finest achievements. The new convent was designed by architect, civil engineer and surveyor Edward Gregory Waters. St Joseph's Convent was opened officially by James Duhig, Archbishop of Brisbane, on 22 March 1914, Bishop Murray having died on 13 February 1914, prior to the opening.

== Description ==
St Joseph's Convent is two-storeyed with a rectangular plan form with a return bay on the southern corner. It is constructed of reinforced concrete and has a wide surrounding verandah at ground and first floor levels with a dominating, two-storeyed entrance portico and gabled roofs. The original fence survives along Lake Street, which consists of a low concrete wall with evenly spaced piers and "Cyclone" chain mesh infill panels running up to a Gothic-styled reinforced concrete arched gate in line with the main entrance door. The building, which is set well back from Lake Street, has a lawned area in front with mature trees each side of a single-width concrete entrance path.

== Heritage listing ==
St Joseph's Convent was listed on the Queensland Heritage Register on 1 July 1997 having satisfied the following criteria.

The place is important in demonstrating the evolution or pattern of Queensland's history.

St Joseph's Convent is significant for its close association with the development of Catholicism and Catholic education in Cairns and district since the early 1900s.

Together with St Monica's Old Cathedral, these buildings form a highly intact ecclesiastical group, and are important in illustrating the evolution of the Catholic Church and Catholic education in Cairns and district.

The place is important in demonstrating the principal characteristics of a particular class of cultural places.

It is also an excellent example of the work of local architect Edward Gregory Waters, and illustrates the establishment of a tradition of building in reinforced concrete, favoured in cyclone-prone Cairns in the early 1900s.

The place is important because of its aesthetic significance.

Despite some refurbishment, the convent survives substantially intact. It remains a fine example of a convent building designed to function in a tropical climate, and is of interest for its re-enforced concrete construction, considered more cyclone-proof than masonry. Together with the nearby Bishop's House and adjacent St Monica's High School Administration Building, St Joseph's Convent is part of a grouping of pre-1945 20th century buildings which, although of different styles, are all of similar scale, materials and planning. Both individually and as a group, these buildings make a significant aesthetic contribution to the Cairns townscape and Abbott Street streetscape, and contribute markedly to the city's sense of physical identity and history.

The place has a special association with the life or work of a particular person, group or organisation of importance in Queensland's history.

It is of significance for its close association with the work of the Sisters of Mercy in expanding Catholic education in far north Queensland, and for over 80 years the place has had a strong association for the local Catholic community with the work of the Sisters of Mercy in Cairns. It remains illustrative of the work of the Augustinian fathers in the Vicariate Apostolic of Cooktown (later the Diocese of Cairns), especially Bishop Murray who encouraged the erection of Catholic churches, schools, convents and presbyteries throughout far North Queensland in the early years of the 20th century.
