= Clare Foley (lawyer) =

Australian lawyer (1913–1998)

Clare Foley (1913–1998) was an Australian lawyer and solicitor.

Clare Bridget Pender (who later went by her married name Clare Foley) was born in Ipswich, Queensland in 1913, the daughter of Edward Pender, a lawyer and his wife Katherine. She attended high school at Stuartholme College in Toowong. She took her Bachelor of Arts degree from the University of Queensland.

== Career ==
After graduation she studied as an article clerk with her brother Thomas Joseph Pender, who operated the legal practice Pender and Pender. In 1939, she became the fourth woman to become a practising solicitor in Queensland with the Supreme Court of Queensland, and was made a partner in the family practice. Clare Pender married Thomas Foley at St Ignatius Church, Toowong in 1945. They bought a home in Toowong that would be named Foley House. After the death of her brother Thomas in 1950, Clare Foley eventually sold the practice to Mary and Eric Whitehouse in 1951.

Foley returned to legal work in 1967 in the practice established by her husband Thomas Michael Foley and their son Thomas Joseph Foley. After the early death of her son in 1992, Clare took over control of the practice until it was sold. Her daughter Mary Foley also pursued law, becoming a Judge of the Family Court of Australia. Her son James became Catholic Bishop of Cairns.

Clare Foley died in Brisbane, Australia in 1998.
