= Paolo Fortini =

Italian missionary priest

The Reverend Paolo Fortini
- Pro-Vicar Apostolic Emeritus of Queensland
- Diocese: Vicariate Apostolic of Queensland
- Installed: 12 February 1882
- Term ended: 1884

Personal details
- Born: Paolo Fortini
- Denomination: Catholic Church
- Occupation: Catholic missionary

Paolo Fontini or Paul Fontini was an Italian missionary priest who served as Pro-Vicar Apostolic of Queensland for two years in the late 19th century.

== Pro-Vicar Apostolic of Queensland ==
On 15 February 1882, Fortini was appointed Pro-Vicar Apostolic of Queensland by Pope Leo XIII. He arrived on 15 June 1882. Faced with a vast geography and limited resources, Fortini secured the services of three Sisters of Mercy and four priests, including three Franciscans.

He faced mixed reaction to his administration. While some supported him, he faced criticism from Irish Catholics, who said his administration was so unsatisfactory it was driving people to Protestantism. He was also accused of being anti-Irish.

On 21 June 1884, he was in Sydney on his way to Rome after being summoned by the Pope.

By February 1885, Fortini had resigned from his position. Reports from Rome suggested Fortini's mission in Australia was an "utter failure", largely because of the dissension with the local Irish population.

John Hutchinson was his successor.

== Death ==
Fortini died in March 1913.

Catholic Church titles
Preceded by John Cani	Pro-Vicar Apostolic of Queensland; 1882–1884	Succeeded by John Hutchinson
