= Bishop's House, Cairns =

Heritage-listed house in Queensland, Australia

Designations

Queensland Heritage Register
- Official name: Bishop's House; St Monica's Monastery/Priory
- Type: State heritage (built)
- Designated: 1 July 1997
- Reference no.: 601747
- Significant period: 1930s (fabric); 1930s– (historical, social)
- Significant components: Furniture/fittings, steps/stairway, verandahs – arcaded, statue, residential accommodation – bishop's house, fence/wall – perimeter
- Builders: Michael Garvey

St Monica's Monastery
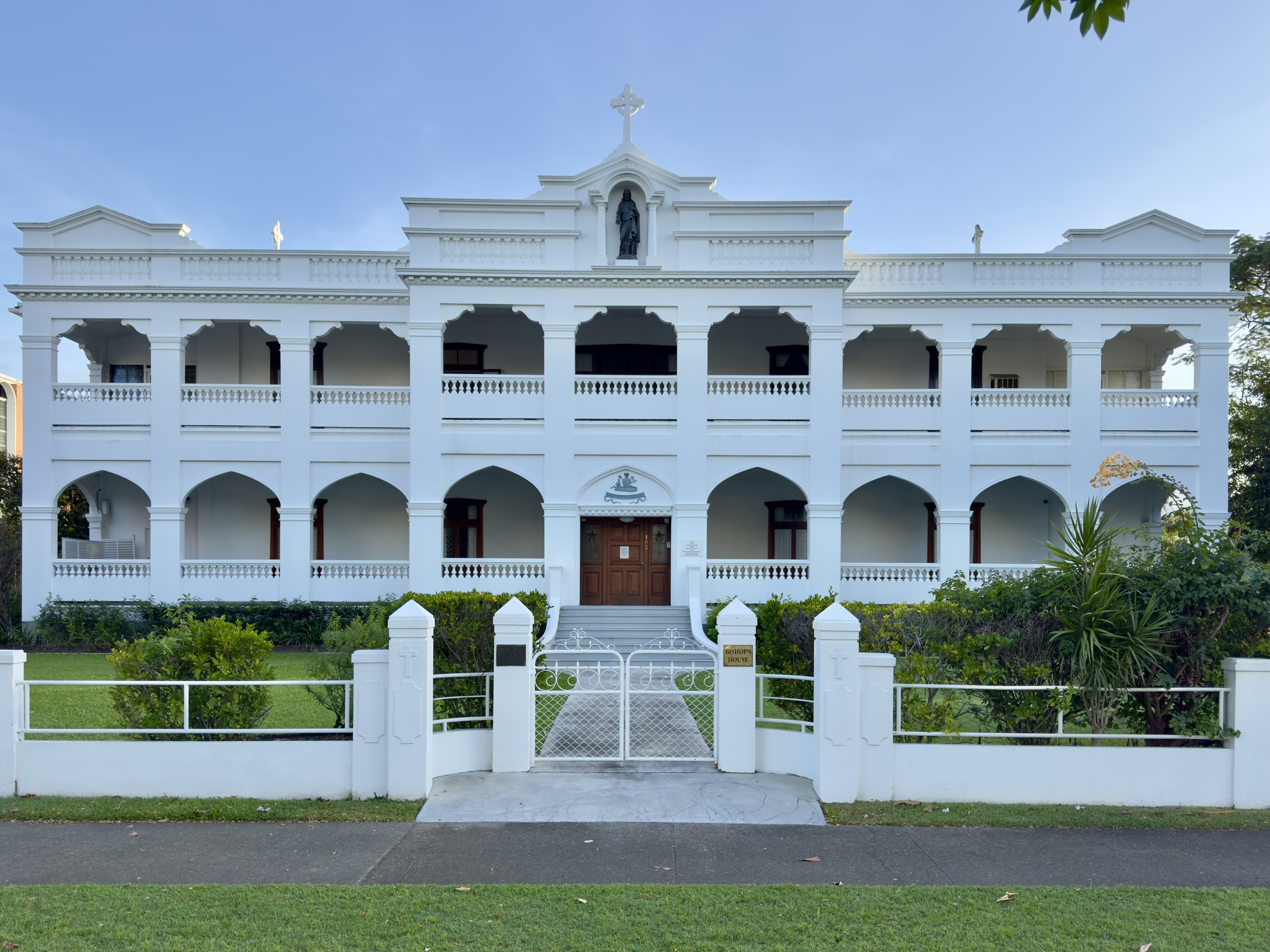
- Bishop's House, Cairns, 2025

- Location within Queensland
- Interactive map of St Monica's Monastery

Monastery information
- Other names: Bishop's House, Cairns
- Order: Augustinian Fathers
- Denomination: Catholic
- Established: 31 August 1930
- Disestablished: c. 1914
- Dedication: Saint Monica
- Dedicated: 21 December 1930
- Diocese: Cairns

People
- Founders: James Duhig; Joseph Phelan

Architecture
- Architect: Joseph Phelan
- Style: Colonial India
- Completion date: 1930
- Construction cost: £7,430

Site
- Location: Abbott Street, Cairns City, Cairns, Cairns Region, Queensland
- Country: Australia
- Coordinates: 16°55′00″S 145°46′21″E

Bishop's House is a heritage-listed former Catholic monastery and now bishop's residence at Abbott Street, Cairns City, Cairns, Cairns Region, Queensland, Australia. It was designed by Father Joseph Phelan and built in 1930 by Michael Garvey. It is also known as St Monica's Monastery/Priory. It was added to the Queensland Heritage Register on 1 July 1997.

== History ==
The Bishop's House at Cairns, a two-storeyed reinforced concrete building, was erected in 1930 as a monastery for the Augustinian fathers who administered the Vicariate Apostolic of Cooktown, and St Monica's Parish in Cairns. It replaced an 1887 timber presbytery.

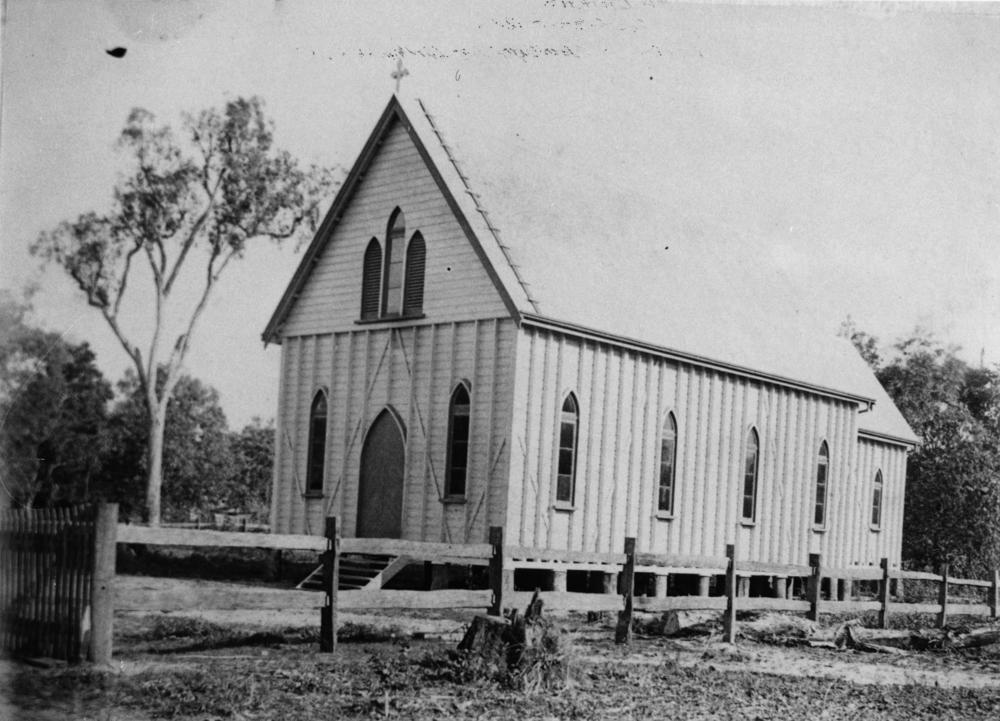
First timber St Monica's church, 1884

Cairns was established in October 1876, as a port to service the Hodgkinson goldfields. In the same year the area from Cardwell to Cape York was separated from the Roman Catholic Diocese of Brisbane as the Pro-Vicariate of North Queensland. In 1884 three Irish Augustinian fathers took charge of the Pro-Vicariate, establishing a monastery at Cooktown, and founding the parish of St Monica's at Cairns in 1885. An acre of land bounded by Abbott, Minnie and Lake Streets was acquired and the first St Monica's Church, a timber building at the corner of Abbott and Minnie Streets on the site of the present Bishop's House, was opened on 10 January 1886. In 1887, the year in which the Pro-Vicariate of North Queensland was constituted the Vicariate Apostolic of Cooktown, a timber presbytery was erected in Abbott Street, adjacent to St Monica's Church. In 1906, the Vicar Apostolic of Cooktown moved his residence to Cairns, which had eclipsed Cooktown as the principal port of far north Queensland, and St Monica's Church became a pro-cathedral.

St Monica's Monastery was erected during a flurry of Catholic building activity in Cairns, which included St Monica's Church-School in 1927, St Augustine's College in 1929, St Monica's Monastery in 1930 and Our Lady of Good Counsel Church-School (North Cairns) in 1936. The work was undertaken principally at the instigation of Father Joseph Phelan, transferred from Mareeba to Cairns to help with the re-construction of St Monica's Church and School following the devastating Cyclone Willis of 9 February 1927. Father Phelan had a knowledge of architecture, and appears to have designed the college, monastery and church-school at North Cairns.

The old St Monica's presbytery was demolished June–July 1930, and by the time the foundation stone of the new monastery was laid by the Bishop of Townsville on 31 August 1930, the exterior walls were half completed. The building was officially opened on 21 December 1930 by Archbishop James Duhig of Brisbane, who described it as "the finest episcopal residence in Australia". The design is attributed to Father Phelan, who supervised construction along with Cairns builder Michael Garvey, who had constructed St Monica's Church-School in 1927 and St Augustine's College in 1929. The monastery was erected in less than 6 months, using day labour and Father Phelan's volunteer week-end working-bee. The plumbing and electrical work was contributed free of charge, and an altar for the oratory was donated as a memorial to a former parishioner. The staircase reputedly was donated by the English family of Malanda, who owned a sawmilling business. Total cost was about £7,430.

Construction of the new Augustinian monastery in Cairns illustrated the strength of the Catholic Church in the Cairns district in the 1920s. The effects of the February 1927 cyclone, followed by flood damage, a severe trade depression, and waterfront disputes affecting the city's building industry, did not deter the predominantly working-class Catholic community of Cairns from contributing funds and labour. The rapid construction was a tribute to the zeal of the Augustinian Fathers at Cairns, particularly Father Phelan, and the enthusiasm they inspired in the local parish.

St Monica's Monastery was erected during the third major phase of Cairns' development, which saw the city boom in the 1920s and 1930s. The Cairns hinterland Soldier Settlement Schemes of the 1920s, the completion of the North Coast rail link to Brisbane in 1924, the continued success of the local sugar industry, the expansion of wharf facilities, the extensive re-building necessitated by a spate of cyclones in the 1920s and the poor condition of earlier timber structures, combined to produce unprecedented building activity in Cairns. The city centre in particular was dominated until the 1980s by substantial, reinforced concrete and brick structures of the interwar period, and in this respect was markedly different from other 19th century-established Queensland towns and cities.

In 1941 the Vicariate of Cooktown was raised to the status of the Diocese of Cairns, with Bishop John Heavey - Vicar Apostolic of Cooktown since 1914 - appointed the first Bishop of Cairns. At this time St Monica's Monastery became known as the Bishop's House. Bishop Heavey was the last of the Augustinian Bishops in the Diocese of Cairns. Following his death in mid-1948, administration of the Diocese was handed over to Diocesan clergy, severing an association with the Irish Augustinians which had lasted over 65 years. From this period, the Augustinian priests began to scale down their involvement in pastoral care in the Diocese, and were replaced mostly with Queensland-born priests trained at the Seminary in Banyo, Brisbane. The Bishop's House remains the residence of the Bishop of Cairns.

== Description ==
The Bishop's House, situated at the corner of Abbott and Minnie Streets, is a two-storeyed building constructed in reinforced concrete in a style reminiscent of colonial India. It has a rectangular plan form with a wide open verandah along Abbott Street. Verandahs that return halfway down the southeast and northwest elevations have been enclosed. A toilet block extends at the western corner and a rear verandah has been enclosed. A two-storeyed c. 1960s addition extends from the southern corner of the building.

A fence contemporary with the construction of the building survives along Abbott Street and returns down Minnie Street. It consists of a low concrete wall with evenly spaced piers and "Cyclone" chain mesh infill panels running up to paired concrete gate posts in line with entrances at Abbott and Minnie Streets.

The Lake Street facade is equally proportioned in three sections with the centre section projecting. These sections are divided into three bays by rectangular columns which have between them at ground floor level a recessed four-centred arch valance and at first floor heavy scrolled brackets. The verandahs at both levels have a partially solid balustrade with shaped square section balusters. Above the verandah is a heavy dentilled cornice with parapet with blind balusters.

The entrance is accentuated at parapet level by a statue of the Virgin Mary in a niche formed by columns supporting a heavy semi-circular pediment. Above this and behind the parapet rises a small gable with a heavy coping. This gable is repeated at the ends of the building along the Abbott Street elevation. The roof which employs both hip and gable forms is clad in corrugated fibrous cement sheeting.

The rear elevation has three sash casement window frames with small hoppers over located between the symmetrical concrete frame and enclosing a rear verandah. Windows at ground level have window hoods supported on decorative timber brackets.

The main entrance to the building is up wide concrete steps to a timber porch which has a heavy timber paneled door with lead-lighted side panels. This detailing is repeated at the entrance door and again in a c. 1940 dividing wall or screen across the foyer. Beyond this screen is a secondary foyer which has a heavy timbered silky oak stair with Edwardian detailing.

The floor plan is designed around a central hall on both levels that typically have French doors opening onto the verandahs. To the right of the main foyer at ground level is what is now a conference room. A small chapel is located in the southern corner of the ground floor in which is situated a white painted timber altar. Other ground floor rooms are now used as offices. The first floor landing extends across the width of the building through a colonnade to the rear verandah which has a single stair to the ground floor. A later suspended ceiling has been installed in this area. To the right of the first floor landing the original Bishop's suite exists in the western corner along Minnie Street. This was extended when the western verandah was enclosed.

The detailing of the doors and windows is Edwardian in clear finished silky oak. Doors are both panelled with patterned opaque hopper over lights or half glass with panelling below. Ceilings are plaster with simple coved cornices and floors are polished timber.

The Bishop's House is very intact.

== Heritage listing ==
Bishop's House was listed on the Queensland Heritage Register on 1 July 1997 having satisfied the following criteria.

The place is important in demonstrating the evolution or pattern of Queensland's history.

The Bishop's House survives as important evidence of the re-building of Cairns in the 1920s and 1930s, during which period the city's status as the principal port of Far North Queensland was consolidated and the city centre was re-built. It also illustrates a tradition of building in re-inforced concrete, favoured in cyclone-prone Cairns since the early 1900s.

Together with St Monica's Old Cathedral, these buildings form a highly intact ecclesiastical group, and are important in illustrating the evolution of the Catholic Church in Cairns and district.

The place is important in demonstrating the principal characteristics of a particular class of cultural places.

Despite some minor refurbishment, the Bishop's House survives substantially intact. It remains a fine example of a monastery building designed to function in a tropical climate, and is of interest for its re-inforced concrete construction, considered more cyclone-proof than masonry.

The place is important because of its aesthetic significance.

Together with the nearby St Joseph's Convent and St Monica's High School Administration Building, Bishop's House is part of a grouping of pre-1945 20th century buildings which, although of different styles, are all of similar scale, materials and planning. Both individually and as a group, these buildings make a significant aesthetic contribution to the Cairns townscape and Abbott Street streetscape, and contribute markedly to the city's sense of physical identity and history.

The place has a strong or special association with a particular community or cultural group for social, cultural or spiritual reasons.

The place has a strong association for residents and visitors alike with the earlier development of Cairns, and has a strong and special association for the Catholic parish of St Monica's, with the evolution of their parish and Diocese.

The place has a special association with the life or work of a particular person, group or organisation of importance in Queensland's history.

The Bishop's House is important also for its close association with the work of the Augustinian fathers, particularly Father Phelan (parish priest of Cairns 1927–37), in the Vicariate Apostolic of Cooktown / Diocese of Cairns.
