= Our Lady of the Sacred Heart Church =

There are multiple churches known as Our Lady of the Sacred Heart Church, including:

Australia

- Our Lady of the Sacred Heart Church, Randwick, New South Wales
- Our Lady of the Sacred Heart Church, Thursday Island, Queensland

Malta

- Our Lady of the Sacred Heart Parish Church, Sliema

Tibet

- Our Lady of the Sacred Heart Church, Yerkalo, Chamdo
