= Tarquino Tanganelli =

Italian missionary priest (1836–1902)

Reverend Tarquino Tanganelli
- Pro-Vicar Apostolic of Queensland
- Diocese: Vicariate Apostolic of Queensland
- Installed: May 1878
- Term ended: August 1878

Orders
- Ordination: 27 December 1859

Personal details
- Born: Tarquino Tanganelli; 26 March 1836 Castiglion Fiorentino, Tuscany, Italy
- Died: 18 January 1902 (aged 65) Mission of Scen-si, China
- Denomination: Catholic Church
- Occupation: Catholic priest

Tarquino Tanganelli (26 March 1836 – 18 January 1902) was an Italian missionary priest of the Catholic Church who served briefly as the Pro-Vicar Apostolic of Queensland.

== Early life ==
Tanganelli was born to Francesco and Agata Corbari in Castiglione Fiorentino, Tuscany. From an early age, he showed a desire to join the priesthood. He was educated by the Piarists and entered the Serristori College to pursue studies for the priesthood.

== Priesthood ==
He was ordained on 27 December 1859 as a priest for the Diocese of Arezzo. He initially served as a parish priest and teacher in the Diocese before being appointed to teach in the seminary. When the seminary closed, he was appointed parish priest of Frassineto, where he served until 1875.

On 21 June 1874, Pope Pius IX had erected the Seminary of the Holy Apostles Peter and Paul in Rome, to be led by Roman priest Fr Pietro Avanzini, to train young Italians wishing to dedicate themselves to the foreign missions. Hearing about his, Tanganelli rushed to Rome to present himself to the Pontiff and be accepted to join. Despite reservations from the bishop of Arezzo, Tanganelli was allowed to join and entered on 18 May 1875.

After studying for a year, he left Rome and went to Bombay, landing on 17 June 1876. During his time in India, he evangelised Tanior, Magapatam and Tricinopoli in the province of Maduré. After a year, he was assigned to Australia and travelled to Cooktown, Queensland.

== Pro-Vicar Apostolic of Queensland ==
On 27 January 1877, Pope Pius IX promulgated the erection of the Vicariate Apostolic of Queensland. Adolphus Lecaille was appointed as the Pro-Vicar Apostolic and Tanganelli was to serve as rector. Lecaille never took possession of the Vicariate Apostolic however and for four months, Tanganelli served as Pro-Vicar Apostolic of Queensland, from May to August 1878. The appointment was only temporary and in November 1878, John Cani assumed control of the Vicariate.

Tensions between the Irish and Italian Catholics in Far North Queensland were high and by 1880, Tanganelli had left the Australian mission to return to his native Italy. After a year back home, he was sent to Colombo, Sri Lanka, where he stayed for five years amidst a bloody religious war.

=== China ===
In 1885, when the Vicariate Apostolic of Southern Shensi was being erected, Tanganelli lent his services to the Chinese mission. He was called to lead the Vicariate Seminary, where he worked vigorously for almost two decades.

== Death ==
On 9 January 1902, Tanganelli had been forced into bed rest due to a stomach ailment. Within two days, it advanced to a high typhoid fever, and he asked for the sacrament of reconciliation and received Holy Viaticum and Extreme Unction. He passed away on 18 January 1902.

Catholic Church titles
Preceded by –	Pro-Vicar Apostolic of Queensland; 1878–1878	Succeeded by John Cani
