= St. Monica's School =

St. Monica's School may refer to:

== Australia ==
- St Monica's High School Administration Building, a heritage-listed school building in Cairns, Queensland
- St Monica's Parish School, Walkerville, South Australia

== Canada ==
- St.Monica Elementary/Jr.High (Calgary)

== Ghana ==
- St. Monica's Senior High School, Mampong, Ashanti Region

== United Kingdom ==
- St Monica's High School, Prestwich, Greater Manchester

== United States ==
- Saint Monica Catholic High School, Los Angeles, California
- Saint Monica Preparatory, Santa Monica, California
