= St Monica's High School Administration Building =

St Monica's College - Sr Cecilia Building
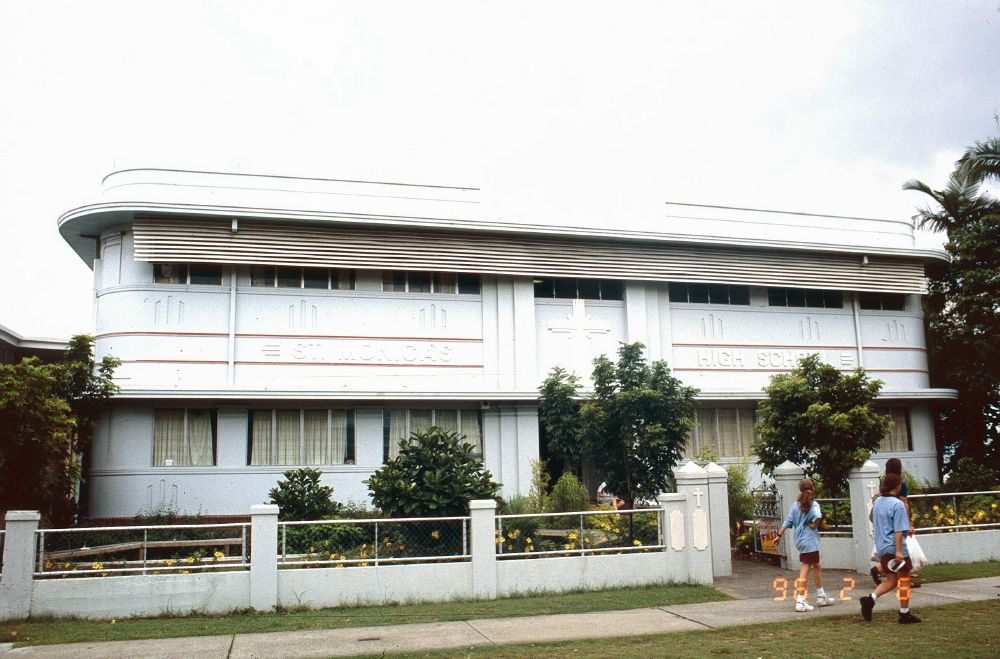
- St Monica's High School Administration Building, 1996

- Location within Queensland Location within Australia
- 16.9176°S 145.7731°E
- Location: Abbott Street, Cairns City, Cairns, Queensland, Australia

History
- Design period: 1939–1945 (World War II)
- Built: 1941

Site notes
- Architect: Vibert McKirdy Brown
- Architectural style: Modernism

Queensland Heritage Register
- Official name: Sister Cecilia Building, St Monica's College
- Type: state heritage (built)
- Designated: 1 July 1997
- Reference no.: 601748
- Significant period: 1940s (historical); 1940s (fabric); 1941–ongoing (social)
- Significant components: office/administration building, fencing
- Builders: VW Doyle

St Monica's College Sr Cecilia Building is a heritage-listed part of the catholic school in Abbott Street, Cairns City, Cairns, Queensland, Australia. It was designed by Vibert McKirdy Brown and built in 1941 by VW Doyle. This building was once also known as St Monica's High School and was used for several years as the school administration building, although now it contains classrooms. It was added to the Queensland Heritage Register on 1 July 1997. St Monica's College is the oldest school in the Cairns region and has two heritage listed buildings - Sr Morrissey Building and the Sr Cecilia Building.

== History ==
St Monica's High School (now the Administration Building) was erected in 1941 for the Sisters of Mercy in Cairns. The two-storeyed re-inforced concrete building was designed by South African-born Cairns architect Vibert McKirdy Brown, and was constructed by contractor VW Doyle.

Nearly 50 years earlier, during the height of the 1890s depression, the Vicar Apostolic of Cooktown, Bishop John Hutchinson, had encouraged the Sisters of Mercy at Cooktown to take over St Monica's School in Cairns (established 1890 with lay staff), where the number of pupils had fallen dramatically from 70 to 19. Three of the sisters from St Mary's at Cooktown moved to Cairns in October 1892 and were successful in encouraging Catholic families to return their children to St Monica's School. By 1894 enrolment had risen to 80, and was well over 100 by the turn-of-the-century. They offered a full primary school curriculum and extra-curricula classes in French, drawing, painting, needlework, and music (vocal and instrumental) to older girls.

In the 1930s the work of the convent school expanded to educate girls to secondary school level. Despite a new St Monica's Church-School having been constructed after Cyclone Willis in February 1927, St Monica's secondary school was conducted under difficult conditions. In what was predominantly a primary school, there were no purpose-designed classrooms for secondary subjects.

Cairns boomed during the interwar period, and by the end of the 1930s the need for a purpose-designed high school building at St Monica's had become urgent. Cairns architect VM Brown was commissioned to design a high school, to be erected on land in Abbott Street which the Sisters had acquired in 1922, adjacent to St Joseph's Convent. A former boarding house, which the Sisters had used as a music school, was demolished prior to construction of the new building.

St Monica's High School was erected toward the end of Cairns' third major phase of development. The Cairns hinterland Soldier Settlement Schemes of the 1920s, the completion of the North Coast rail link to Brisbane in 1924, the continued success of the local sugar industry, the expansion of wharf facilities, the extensive re-building necessitated by a spate of cyclones in the 1920s and the poor condition of earlier timber structures, combined to produce unprecedented building activity in Cairns in the interwar period. The city centre in particular was dominated until the 1980s by substantial, reinforced concrete and brick structures of the interwar period, and in this respect was markedly different from other 19th century-established Queensland towns and cities. St Monica's High School made an important contribution to this re-construction.

Work on St Monica's High School had begun by January 1941, and was completed by late August, at a cost of approximately £5,000. Plans had been approved prior to the Australian Government's war-time restrictions on buildings costing over £3,000, introduced in mid-1941. Bishop John Heavey blessed and officially opened the High School on Sunday 31 August 1941, and the school was occupied by the Sisters and students the next day.

The new building was considered an asset to the architecture of the city. The design was in the Moderne style, with sweeping horizontal and vertical lines and a minimum of architectural ornament. The building was constructed of re-inforced concrete throughout - including the floors and roofs of the deep verandahs. On the ground floor were two large classrooms, main entrance hall, and rear entrance porch and cloak room. Each of the rooms could be divided in two by folding doors. A staircase led from the entrance hall on the ground floor to a central hall on the upper floor, which housed the music rooms: 12 cubicles for pianos, insulated with Canite and Masonite, with glass observation windows in the dividing walls. The building was designed to be extended at the north end with an additional wing, and for a third storey to be added.

When St Monica's School expanded in the late 1960s and early 1970s and became exclusively a secondary school for girls, the purpose-designed 1941 building was not extended as intended. New high school blocks were erected fronting Lake Street, behind the original St Monica's High School building, which has been refurbished as the school's administration centre. In 1989, title to the property was transferred from the Sisters of Mercy to the Diocese of Cairns.

== Description ==
St Monica's High School, which is set back from Lake Street, is a two-storeyed reinforced concrete building with a rectangular floor plan. It has a fibrous cement hipped roof and is surrounded on three sides by reinforced concrete verandahs that have been enclosed with the insertion of aluminium windows. Continuous horizontal wide projecting concrete hoods, which have rounded corners, run over the verandah openings and give the building a strong horizontal character. This is accentuated by small cornices running around the building at parapet and first floor levels.

The central entrance is highlighted by stepped piers at each side that rise through the first floor to a fluted stepped parapet which is finished with a small cross. Below this at first floor level is a large cross in low relief. Each side of this, also in low relief, is located the name ST MONICA'S - HIGH SCHOOL. Solid balustrades at first and ground floor levels have indented stripped patterns symmetrically positioned between concrete piers that support the verandahs and project and terminate above the parapet.

The original fence survives along Lake Street, and consists of a low concrete wall with evenly spaced piers and "Cyclone" chain mesh infill panels running up to paired concrete gateposts in line with the entrance door.

The ground floor has two large classrooms that are divided by a central hall which connects to a small attached rear porch and cloakroom. Access to the first floor is from a return stair at the end of the hall. After 1949 the first floor room on the left of the entry was fitted out as a science room, with wooden built-in semi-circular tiered seating and benches. It remained this way up to at least 1970.

== Heritage listing ==
St Monica's High School Administration Building was listed on the Queensland Heritage Register on 1 July 1997 having satisfied the following criteria.

The place is important in demonstrating the evolution or pattern of Queensland's history.

St Monica's High School Administration Building is significant historically for its close association with the development of Catholic secondary education for girls in Cairns and district since 1941. It is also evidence of the re-building of Cairns in the interwar period, sustained into the early 1940s until interrupted by the Second World War. During this period the city's status as the principal port of Far North Queensland was consolidated and the city centre was largely re-built. It also illustrates a tradition of building in re-inforced concrete, favoured in cyclone-prone Cairns since the early 1900s.

Together with St Monica's Old Cathedral, these buildings form a highly intact ecclesiastical group, and are important in illustrating the evolution of the Catholic Church and Catholic education in Cairns and district.

The place is important in demonstrating the principal characteristics of a particular class of cultural places.

Despite internal and external refurbishment as offices, St Monica's High School Administration Building survives largely intact, and is an illustration of 1940s tropical architecture in the then fashionable and progressive Moderne style. It is of interest also for its re-inforced concrete construction, considered more cyclone-proof than masonry, and is a good example of non-government school design of the period.

The place is important because of its aesthetic significance.

Together with the adjacent St Joseph's Convent and nearby Bishop's House, St Monica's High School Administration Building is part of a grouping of pre-1945 20th century buildings which, although of different styles, are all of similar scale, materials and planning. Both individually and as a group, these buildings make a significant aesthetic contribution to the Cairns townscape and Abbott Street streetscape, and contribute markedly to the city's sense of physical identity and history.

The place has a strong or special association with a particular community or cultural group for social, cultural or spiritual reasons.

St Monica's High School Administration Building has a strong association for the local Catholic community with the work of the Sisters of Mercy in offering secondary education to the girls of Cairns and district in the mid-20th century.

The place has a special association with the life or work of a particular person, group or organisation of importance in Queensland's history.

The place is important as a good example of the work of Cairns architect VM Brown, and is important for its close association with the work of the Sisters of Mercy in expanding Catholic education in far north Queensland.
