= St Monica's Old Cathedral =

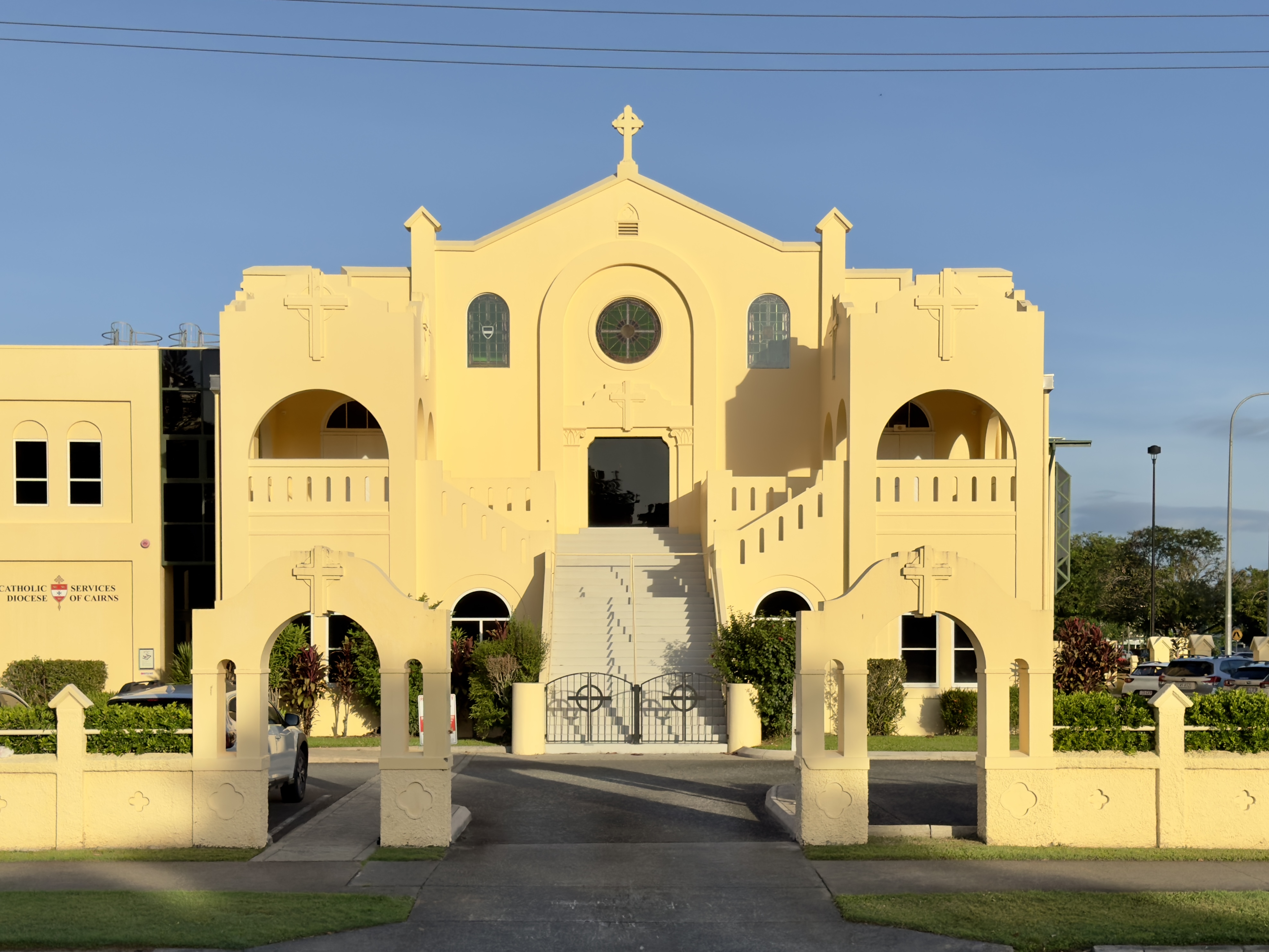
- St Monica's Old Cathedral, 2025

- Location within Queensland Location within Australia
- 16°55′02″S 145°46′20″E
- Location: Minnie Street, Cairns City, Cairns, Cairns Region, Queensland, Australia

History
- Design period: 1919–1930s (interwar period)
- Built: 1927

Site notes
- Architect(s): Lawrence and Lordan
- Architectural style: Spanish Mission

Queensland Heritage Register
- Official name: St Monica's Old Cathedral, St Monica's Cathedral, St Monica's Church and School
- Type: State heritage (landscape, built)
- Designated: 1 July 1997
- Reference no.: 601750
- Significant period: 1920s–1968 (historical) ongoing (social)
- Significant components: Cathedral, gymnasium, views to, gate – entrance, school/school room
- Builders: Michael Garvey

St Monica's Old Cathedral is a heritage-listed former Roman Catholic cathedral at Minnie Street, Cairns City, Cairns, Cairns Region, Queensland, Australia. It was designed by Lawrence and Lordan and was built in 1927 by Michael Garvey. It is also known as St Monica's Cathedral and St Monica's Church & School. It was added to the Queensland Heritage Register on 1 July 1997.

Following completion of the new St Monica's Cathedral, the building was deconsecrated as a church and has subsequently been repurposed as offices for the Diocese of Cairns and local parish.

== History ==
St Monica's Old Cathedral was erected in 1927 as St Monica's Church-School, replacing an earlier church and school demolished in the cyclone of 9 February 1927.

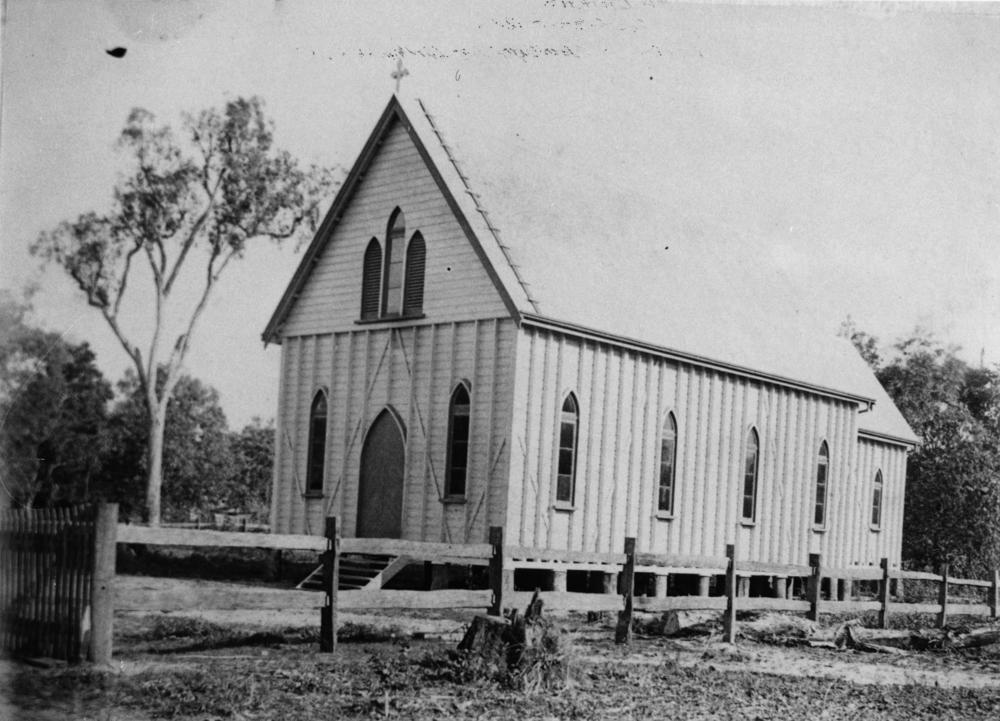
The first St Monica's Church, 1884

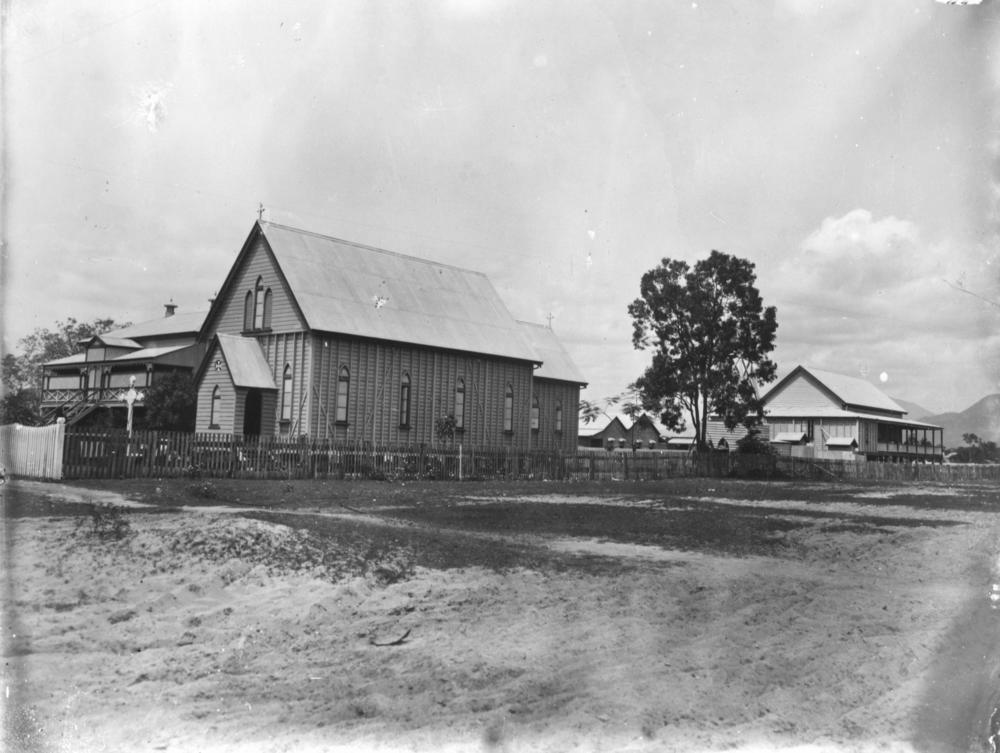
St Monica's with a porch and presbytery added

Cairns was established in October 1876, as a port to service the Hodgkinson goldfields. In the same year the area from Cardwell to Cape York was separated from the Roman Catholic Diocese of Brisbane as the Pro-Vicariate of North Queensland. In 1884, three Irish Augustinian fathers took charge of the Pro-Vicariate, establishing a priory at Cooktown, and in 1885 they founded the parish of St Monica's at Cairns. An acre of land bounded by Abbott, Minnie and Lake Streets was acquired and the first St Monica's Church, a timber building at the corner of Abbott and Minnie Streets, was opened on 10 January 1886. A school fronting Minnie Street opened at the beginning of the 1890 school year - staffed initially by lay teachers, but from October 1892 by Sisters of Mercy from St Mary's Convent in Cooktown, who established a foundation in Cairns. In 1906, the Vicar Apostolic of Cooktown moved his residence to Cairns, which had eclipsed Cooktown as the principal port of far North Queensland, and at this time St Monica's Church acquired the status of pro-cathedral.

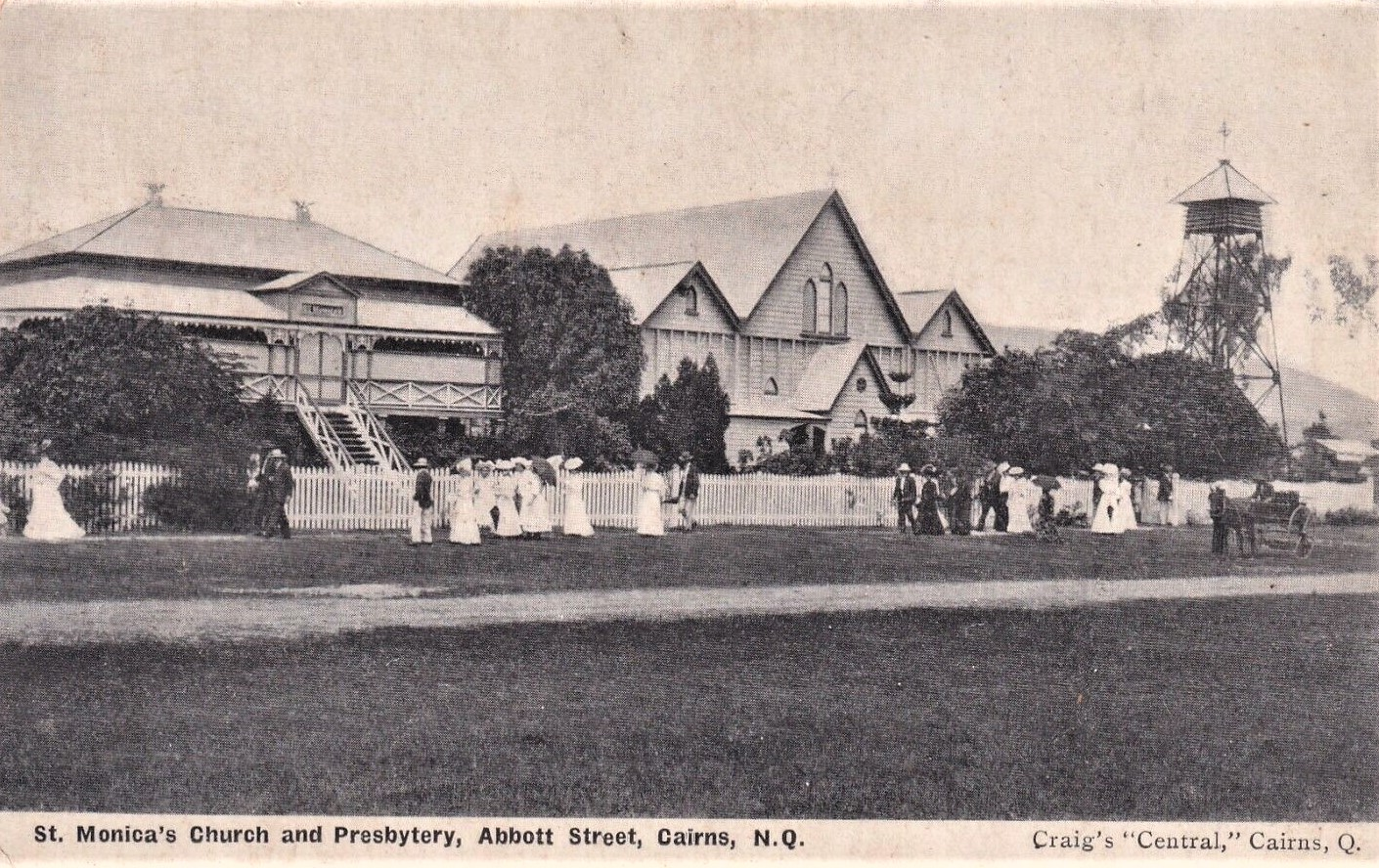
St. Monica's Church and Presbytery, circa 1910

The first St Monica's church and school were destroyed in Cyclone Willis of 9 February 1927. Plans for a cathedral had to be abandoned as appeals were launched locally and in southern dioceses for reconstruction funds. Lawrence and Lordan, architects of Cairns, designed a building to function as both church and school. In the interim, mass was held at the Palace Picture Theatre, and the convent school was conducted at the Irish Association's Hibernian Hall.

Tenders for the new church-school at the corner of Minnie and Lake Streets were called in March 1927. The contract was let to Cairns builder Michael Garvey, who completed the large, reinforced concrete building, officially opened on 16 October 1927, in about 7 months. The ground floor - 110 by 58 feet (34 by 18 m) divided by folding doors - contained the school. The upper storey housed the church, including the altar from the first St Monica's Church.

The design used Gothic motifs, had spacious surrounding verandahs, and was much admired. The building was well ventilated, seated 900, and cost nearly £9,000 to erect. With new seating the total cost was over £10,000, and its construction illustrated the strength of the Catholic Church in the Cairns district in the 1920s. The effects of the February 1927 cyclone, followed almost immediately by flood damage, a severe trade depression, and waterfront disputes affecting the city's building industry, did not deter the predominantly working-class Catholic community of Cairns from raising within 8 months nearly £5,000 toward the re-construction. The local parish priest, Father Phelan, raised a working-bee of 40 men who for months gave their spare time to clearing the debris of the church and school destroyed in the February cyclone. The rapid construction was a tribute to the zeal of the Augustinian fathers, especially Father Phelan, and the enthusiasm they inspired in the parish.

St Monica's Church and School was erected during the third major phase of Cairns' development, which saw the city boom in the 1920s and 1930s. The Cairns hinterland Soldier Settlement Schemes of the 1920s, the completion of the North Coast rail link to Brisbane in 1924, the continued success of the local sugar industry, the expansion of wharf facilities, the extensive re-building necessitated by a spate of cyclones in the 1920s and the poor condition of earlier timber structures, combined to produce unprecedented building activity in Cairns. The city centre in particular was dominated until the 1980s by substantial, reinforced concrete and brick structures of the interwar period, and in this respect was markedly different from other 19th century-established Queensland towns and cities.

On 8 July 1941 the Vicariate Apostolic of Cooktown was raised to the status of Diocese of Cairns with Dr John Heavey (Vicar Apostolic since 1914) as the first Bishop of Cairns. At this time St Monica's Church became St Monica's Cathedral, and imposing front stairs were added to the Minnie Street facade c. 1948. Prior to this, entry was from two sets of stairs on the Lake Street elevation.

In July 1968 St Monica's War Memorial Cathedral was opened, and the former St Monica's Cathedral ceased functioning as a church. The altar and Bishop's Chair were removed to the new cathedral and a stage was erected at the southern end of the former nave, which currently accommodates St Monica's School gymnasium. In the late 1960s and early 1970s St Monica's School became exclusively a secondary school for girls. New school buildings were erected fronting Lake Street and the lower level of St Monica's Old Cathedral, formerly the convent school, was refurbished as Diocesan and parish offices.

== Description ==
St Monica's Old Cathedral, located at the corner of Lake and Minnie Streets, is a two-storeyed, reinforced concrete building with timber floors and gabled roof structure. It has a rectangular floor plan with projecting c. 1948 porches at the west elevation and runs parallel to Lake Street and is set back from Minnie Street.

A pair of concrete arched pedestrian gates surmounted with Celtic crosses in low relief are located in Minnie Street each side of a vehicle crossing to the site. This gateway leads across an asphalt forecourt to a wide stair to the first floor entrance erected c. 1948. The stair has slotted balustrades and a landing that leads left and right to colonnaded porticos at first floor level. These porticos have stepped gables on three sides with large Celtic crosses in relief on each side. At the top of the main stair are located double entrance doors which have a raised stepped plain pediment with Celtic cross supported on piers with Doric-styled half capitals. Beside these, piers rise into a semi-circular arch, which has below it and above the entrance door, a glazed roundel. Above the arch is a small lancet window. Round-headed casement windows are located each side of the arch.

At the top of the main stair are double entrance doors which have a raised stepped plain pediment with Celtic cross supported on piers with Doric styled half capitals. Beside these, piers rise into a semicircular arch, which has below it and above the entrance door, a glazed roundel. Above the arch is a small lancet window. Each side of the arch are located round-headed casement windows. Access to the first floor was originally via a pair of timber dog leg stairs on the south elevation from Lake Street. These stairs led to double doors with timber porches with gable roofs over.

The western wall terminates at the first floor in a projecting gable with a coping. The gable terminates with squared piers finished with gable caps. The north and south walls have a high parapet that is finished in a wide castellation with regularly spaced piers which stop short of the top of the parapet and are finished with a gabled cap. At first floor level are large square aluminium windows with louvres which replaced paired timber casement windows with lancet hoppers. At ground floor level on the southern and northern elevations the segmental arched colonnades have been infilled with aluminium joinery. East elevation has a matching gable to west end, with small lancet windows at high level between squared piers. There are three louvred windows symmetrically positioned at first floor level and below this three casement windows with hoppers over.

The ground floor which was originally divided into classrooms has original walls remaining but the spaces have in part been subdivided to suit new functional arrangements. The panelled ceilings with deep timber floor beams projecting below them.

The original cathedral space that extends over the entire first floor area has utilitarian detailing, with timber supporting columns with lancet arches between them, dividing the main space from aisles on each side. At the western end of each aisle are located double entrance doors with semi-circular heads that open out to the double-storeyed porticos. A raised timber gallery extends between the aisles over the main entrance; this is accessed by a steep timber stair and supported by timber posts with decorated brackets. The aisle ceilings are clad in narrow tongue and groove boarding and the ceiling over the former nave is divided into large panels with the same detailing. Wrought iron tension rods from the roof trusses are suspended below the ceiling. There is a stage at the east end of the former nave.

== Heritage listing ==
St Monica's Old Cathedral was listed on the Queensland Heritage Register on 1 July 1997 having satisfied the following criteria.

The place is important in demonstrating the evolution or pattern of Queensland's history.

St Monica's Old Cathedral is significant as the first Roman Catholic cathedral in Cairns, 1948–1968, and for its close association with Catholic worship and education in Cairns since 1927. It is also evidence of the re-building of Cairns in the 1920s and 1930s, during which period the city's status as the principal port of Far North Queensland was consolidated and the city centre was re-built. It also illustrates a tradition of building in re-inforced concrete, favoured in cyclone-prone Cairns since the early 1900s.

The place is important in demonstrating the principal characteristics of a particular class of cultural places.

Despite some internal and external refurbishment, St Monica's Old Cathedral survives substantially intact. It remains a good example of a type of combined church and school design favoured by the Catholic Church in the interwar period, and is of interest for its re-inforced concrete construction, considered more cyclone-proof than masonry, and adaptations to a tropical climate.

The place is important because of its aesthetic significance.

Together with the nearby Bishop's House, St Joseph's Convent and St Monica's High School Administration Building, St Monica's Old Cathedral is part of a grouping of pre-1945 20th century buildings which, both individually and as a group, make a significant aesthetic contribution to the Cairns townscape, and contribute markedly to the city's sense of physical identity and history. They form a highly intact ecclesiastical group, and are important in illustrating the evolution of the Catholic Church and Catholic education in Cairns and district.

The place has a strong or special association with a particular community or cultural group for social, cultural or spiritual reasons.

The place has a strong association for residents and visitors alike with the earlier development of Cairns, and has a strong and special association for the Catholic parish of St Monica's, with the evolution of their parish and the elevation of Cairns to a cathedral city in 1941.

The place has a special association with the life or work of a particular person, group or organisation of importance in Queensland's history.

The place is important for its association with the work of Cairns architects Lawrence and Lordan, with the work of the Augustinian fathers in the Vicariate Apostolic of Cooktown (in particular Bishop Heavey and Father Phelan), and with the work of the Sisters of Mercy in expanding Catholic education in north Queensland.
