= Our Lady of the Sacred Heart Church, Thursday Island =

Our Lady of the Sacred Heart Church
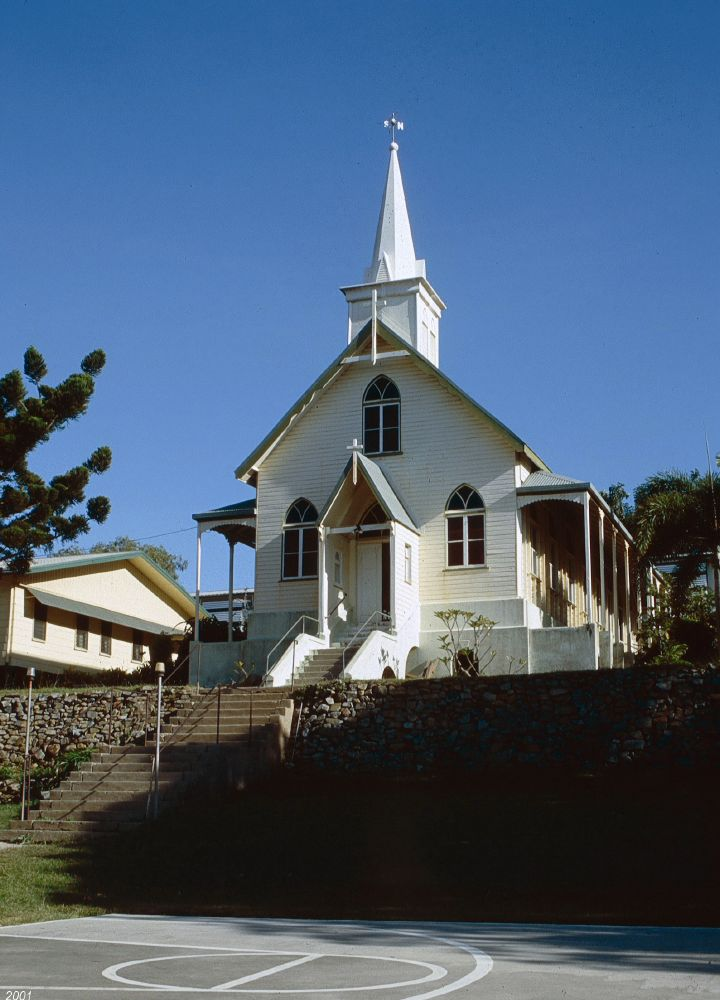
- Our Lady of the Sacred Heart Church, 2001
- Our Lady of the Sacred Heart Church
- 10°35′01″S 142°12′55″E
- Address: 120 Douglas Street, Thursday Island, Shire of Torres, Queensland
- Country: Australia
- Denomination: Roman Catholic
- Website: cairns.catholic.org.au/parishes/thursday-island

History
- Status: Church

Architecture
- Style: Gothic Revival
- Years built: c. 1885 – c. 1905; 121 years ago

Administration
- Diocese: Cairns
- Parish: Thursday Island

Clergy
- Priest: Fr Michael Szymanski PP

Queensland Heritage Register
- Official name: Our Lady of the Sacred Heart Church
- Type: state heritage (built, landscape)
- Designated: 7 December 1998
- Reference no.: 601287
- Significant period: 1880s, 1920s–1930s (historical); 1880s–ongoing (social); 1930s (fabric murals)
- Significant components: confessional, mural / fresco, views to, church, stained glass window/s, furniture/fittings

Our Lady of the Sacred Heart Church is a heritage-listed Roman Catholic church at 120 Douglas Street, Thursday Island, Shire of Torres, Queensland, Australia. It was built from c. 1885 to c. 1905. It was added to the Queensland Heritage Register on 7 December 1998.

== History ==
Our Lady of the Sacred Heart Church at Thursday Island was erected by French and Italian priests of the Missionaries of the Sacred Heart, who had arrived on the island in October 1884. On Thursday Island they established the first Catholic mission in the Torres Strait, erecting there a small church c. 1885. If this is the existing church (which is not substantiated), it is the oldest surviving building on Thursday Island. Photographic evidence suggests that by c. 1905, the church had acquired its present form and concrete footings. Queensland had no jurisdiction over the islands of the Torres Strait until annexing them in 1872, largely to protect Queensland interests in the pearl-shelling and beche-de-mer fisheries in the Strait, and to regulate the employment of South Sea Islanders in these enterprises. With annexation, Torres Strait Islanders acquired the same status as mainland Aborigines, and the official Queensland Government settlement at Somerset on Cape York Peninsula (established 1864) was moved in 1877 to Port Kennedy at Thursday Island. The new location provided a sheltered, deepwater anchorage, and was more centrally located along the main shipping route through the inner channel of Torres Strait – the principal trade route to Asia and the northern route to England. The island was known to the Kaurareg, a maritime people who inhabited the off-shore islands near Cape York, as Wai-ben.

By early 1884, Port Kennedy had emerged as the principal port for cargo and passengers being trans-shipped to Normanton, and was the hub of the pearl-shell and beche-de-mer fisheries in the Torres Strait. The permanent population was about 70, and it serviced a district of nearly 700 inhabitants. In addition, within from 3 to 50 miles (4.8 to 80.5 km) of Thursday Island pearl-shell and beche-de-mer fishing stations were employing about 1500 people of all races (including significant numbers of South Sea Islanders, Japanese and Filipinos). At this period about 800 or 900 long tons (910 t) of shell were exported annually to New South Wales, Britain and other places, and the Queensland Government was collecting substantial revenue from licenses.

The Mission of Our Lady of the Sacred Heart had been founded in France by Fr Louis Andre Navarre, Dean of Bourges, in the 1860s, and was approved of as a religious congregation by the Holy See in 1869. In March 1881, Pope Leo XIII requested that the Sacred Heart Fathers establish a mission in New Guinea, within the Vicariate Apostolic of Melanesia and Micronesia. Like the Protestant evangelists who had arrived in the Torres Strait in the early 1870s, the Sacred Heart Fathers decided to facilitate their entry into New Guinea by establishing a mission in Torres Strait, to serve as a stop-over station and link between the Society's missions on the Australian mainland and their proposed mission in New Guinea.

On 24 October 1884, the first three Sacred Heart missionaries – Fr Louis Andre Navarre, Fr Ferdinand Hartzer, and Br Giuseppe de Santis – arrived at Thursday Island, soon to be joined by two more fathers and three young Italian brothers. Initially, Sunday Mass was held at McNulty's Hotel (later the Federal Hotel), the congregation comprising mostly Filipino pearl-shell fishers (Manila Men). At Christmas the Filipinos came in the hundreds to attend Mass and seek confession.

In January 1885, Frs Navarre and Hartzer purchased allotment 4 of section 4 (2 roods (22,000 sq ft; 2,000 m^{2}) in Port Kennedy for £6, at the first sale of crown land on Thursday Island. By February 1886 they had erected a small church and a dwelling house. By December 1886, Our Lady of the Sacred Heart mission at Thursday Island comprised three buildings, all constructed by the Italian brothers: a small, unpretentious iron church, some little distance up the hill, to one side of this a small convent accommodating four religious sisters, and to the other side a presbytery which also served as a sanatorium for fever-stricken and debilitated priests from New Guinea and other islands. It is not clear whether the c. 1885 church is the existing church.

From 1884 to 1889, Our Lady of the Sacred Heart mission at Thursday Island was the point of departure for all the Catholic missions – French, German, Swiss and other nationalities – in British New Guinea and New Britain. After 1889 the German Missionaries went directly to New Britain but the French continued to stop over at Thursday Island before going to their New Guinea mission headquarters at Yule Island. Later they went via Port Moresby. The first Sisters of Our Lady of the Sacred Heart arrived at Thursday Island in January 1886 and a year later opened a small school on the verandah of the convent. Not until c. 1900 was a purpose-designed schoolhouse erected. In the late 1880s, the Sisters also established Thursday Island's first and only hospital, until a government hospital was constructed c. 1910. In 1889, the Sacred Heart missionaries also erected St Henry's Roman Catholic Asylum, a charitable institution conducted by the Sacred Heart Sisters, who offered board and education to children of every race and denomination within the Vicariates of New Guinea and New Britain. This was closed in 1942, reopened briefly in 1948, and in 1961–62 was converted to house Our Lady of the Sacred Heart School, the c. 1900 school building being abandoned. In 1973, a new Sacred Heart school was constructed.

In 1889, the Vicariate Apostolic of Melanesia and Micronesia was divided into the Vicariates of British New Guinea (later Papua), New Britain and Gilbert Islands. Thursday Island was placed under the Vicariate Apostolic of British New Guinea, Fr Louis Andre Navarre being appointed the first Vicar Apostolic and consecrated Bishop. Archbishop Navarre devoted the remainder of his life to his work in the Vicariate Apostolic of British New Guinea. Owing to age and ill health he resigned his position in 1908, Father Alain Guynot de Boismenu succeeding him. By the time of his death in January 1912 (at Townsville, en route south from New Guinea) the New Guinea Mission of Our Lady of the Sacred Heart was served by 25 missionaries, 21 lay brothers, and 38 sisters; they had opened 38 schools and two orphanages; 28 stations had been established, each provided with churches, schools and residences; and from the central station on Yule Island, 78 villages were regularly visited and instructed.

The work of the Sacred Heart missionaries on Thursday Island was expanded in the 1920s and 1930s. In 1927, Father J Doyle was appointed Parish Priest on Thursday Island. He obtained permission from the Queensland Department of Native Affairs to establish a mission on Hammond Island (then without a resident population) to service the pearl-shell divers and their families in the area, and this was opened in 1929. In 1935 a mission church was erected on Naghir Island, about 30 miles (48 km) from Thursday Island, but this had been demolished by white ants by the early 1940s.

In 1935, David Sing, born at Thursday Island in 1911, painted the trompe l'oeil murals on the rear wall of the sanctuary of Our Lady of the Sacred Heart Church, and on the front of the altar. David became a lay missionary at the age of 17, and painted religious works in Catholic churches at Thursday Island, Port Moresby and Tully. (The Tully work, a painting on canvas hung behind the altar, no longer survives.) He studied with JS Watkins in Sydney, and was early influenced by the French Impressionist School, before entering the Trappist Order in the United States, where he studied at the Chicago Art Institute. In 1940, he About 1949, he entered the Carthusian Order in Italy – the first Australian to be ordained into the Order – and studied art in Paris and Rome. His paintings proved an important source of income for the Carthusians, and were collected by persons as prominent as Jaqueline Onassis and Patricia Nixon. In the late 1970s, during a 3-year visit to Australia, he painted portraits of a number of prominent Australians, including author Xavier Herbert and thalidomide researcher Dr William G McBride (both these portraits were entered in the Archibald Prize competition of 1977). Sing also held an exhibition of landscapes, still-life, and portraits in Sydney in 1978.

In 1938 the Sacred Heart Mission in the Torres Strait was transferred from the Vicariate Apostolic of Papua (formerly British New Guinea) to the Diocese of Darwin, becoming a Mission of the Australian Province. It remained within the Diocese of Darwin until transferred to the Diocese of Cairns in 1967, after which the parish was no longer staffed by Sacred Heart priests but by Cairns Diocesan clergy. Since 1968, Sacred Heart school on Thursday Island has been run by Sisters of Mercy from Cairns. With the transfer to the Cairns Diocese in 1967, Weipa and Bamaga on Cape York Peninsula were annexed to the Thursday Island Mission, although Bamaga had been serviced from Thursday Island for some years prior to this. In 1982 Weipa separated from Thursday Island parish, which currently comprises the missions at Thursday Island (Waibene), Hammond Island (Kiriri), Horn Island (Nurupai), and Bamaga.

In 1983 the flat-iron spire of Our Lady of the Sacred Heart Church on Thursday Island was replaced with a fibreglass copy as the first phase of a centenary renovations programme. The roof was reclad in 1992.

== Description ==
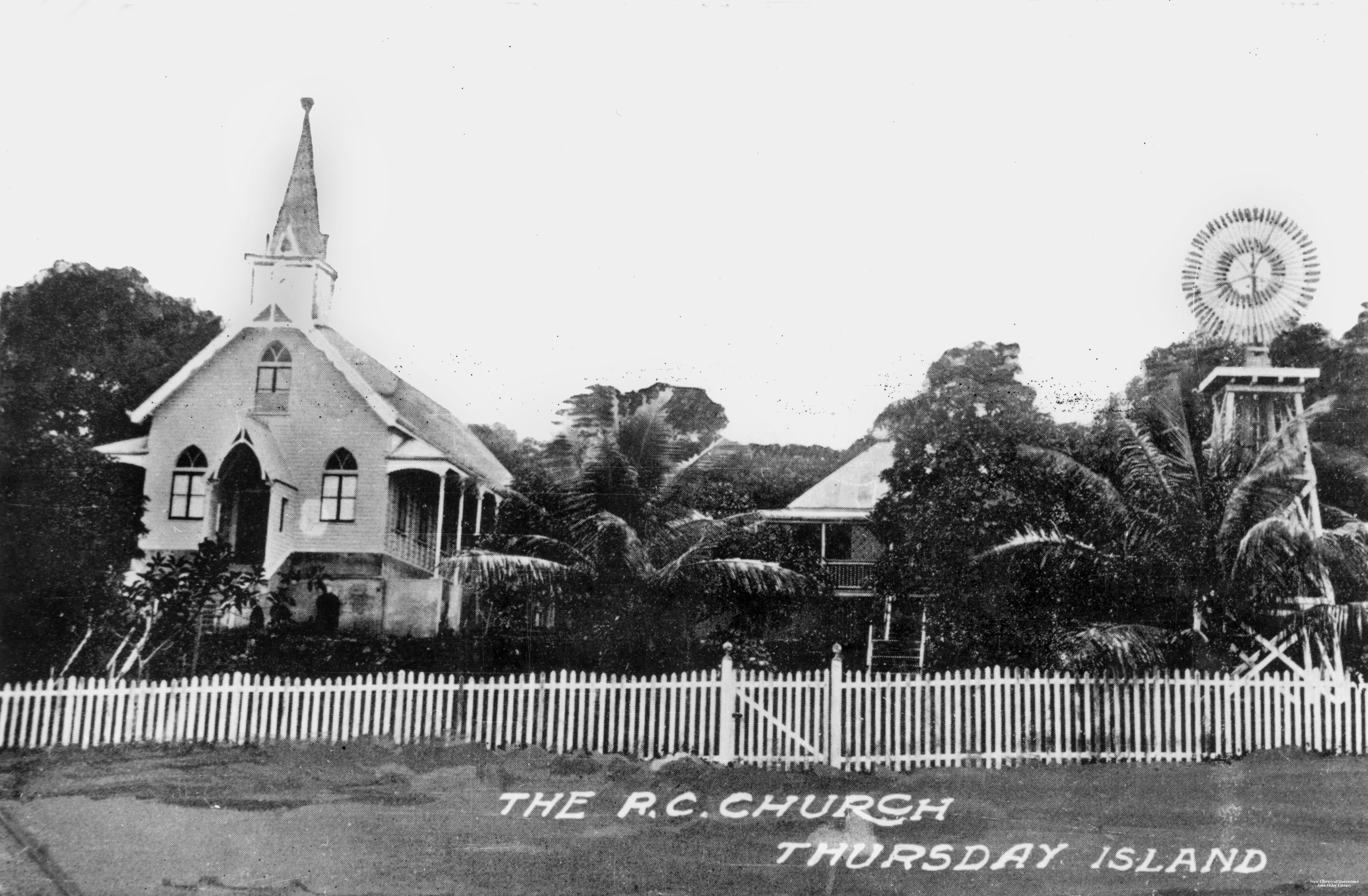
Our Lady of the Sacred Heart Church, circa 1905

Our Lady of the Sacred Heart Church is a substantial timber building with a gabled roof clad with galvanised iron, and concrete foundations. It is sited prominently in Douglas Street on the slope leading up to the east–west ridge which runs the length of the island, and from the water approach is a conspicuous element in the Thursday Island townscape. It sits within a precinct which includes the Catholic presbytery, Our Lady of the Sacred Heart convent and school, and teacher's residence.

The building is rectangular in shape (no transepts) with a small front porch and side verandahs, and rear vestry. The timber frame is lined with single-skin chamferboards on the side walls, but the front wall, which is exposed to the weather, has an exterior weatherboard cladding. The vestry has been clad externally with fibrous-cement sheeting. The church is raised above the ground on concrete piers, and the undercroft is enclosed with concrete walling.

The front elevation faces south-east, and is distinguished by a fibreglass spire – a copy of the original. The centrally located front door, the windows either side of the door, and the window in the gable infill, all have Gothic arches. Similarly shaped windows are located along each side wall. All the windows are multi-paned and have bright red and blue glass in the arch infill, and the windows and French doors nearest the sanctuary also have large panels of green glass. One of the front windows has panes of bright yellow glass.

The grounds are terraced with rubble stone retaining walls. Four flights of concrete steps lead from the lower terrace to the upper terrace and up to the front door of the church.

Internally, the building comprises one large rectangular space divided into nave and sanctuary, with chamferboard ceiling and walls. At the rear of the nave above the front entrance is a choir loft, accessed from a staircase in the southern corner. The choir loft has a decorative cast-iron railing and fine timber work. A painted timber confessional is located at the rear of the nave, to the right of the main entrance. On either side of the nave, close to the sanctuary, is a set of French doors opening onto the side verandahs. The ceiling is lined with chamferboards.

The floors are of timber, that of the sanctuary being raised about 60 centimetres (24 in) above the floor of the nave, and accessed by two steps running the width of the floor. The railing which once separated sanctuary from nave has been removed. The sanctuary has a fine carved timber altar. The whole of the rear wall of the sanctuary is lined with sheeting and has a painted trompe l'oeil mural painted in 1935. There is similar trompe l'oeil work on the front of the altar. Above the altar in the rear wall is a circular window with painted glass. Two doors in the rear wall, one either side of the altar, lead to the vestry at the rear.

== Heritage listing ==
Our Lady of the Sacred Heart Church was listed on the Queensland Heritage Register on 7 December 1998 having satisfied the following criteria.

The place is important in demonstrating the evolution or pattern of Queensland's history.

Our Lady of the Sacred Heart Church at Thursday Island, erected in the late 19th century, survives as important evidence of early European missionary activity in the Torres Strait. It also offers important evidence of the development of the island as the hub of the Torres Strait and gateway to New Guinea in the late 19th century.

The place has potential to yield information that will contribute to an understanding of Queensland's history.

The place has potential to reveal valuable information about the early work of Thursday Island-born artist, David Sing, who achieved international status with his traditionalist oil paintings.

The place is important in demonstrating the principal characteristics of a particular class of cultural places.

The building remains substantially intact and is a good example of a late 19th century timber church with decorative Gothic elements and (less commonly) side verandahs. It retains many early fittings and fixtures, including the choir loft, pews, altar, decorative fretwork, the 1930s painted trompe l'oeil murals on the sanctuary wall and altar, and statuary which integrates with the wall mural to re-inforce the three-dimensional effect.

The place is important because of its aesthetic significance.

The exterior with its decorative verandahs, porch and spire is aesthetically pleasing, and the place is a prominent landmark in the Thursday Island townscape. The place has a strong and special religious significance with a mainly islander community for cultural and spiritual reasons.

The place has a strong or special association with a particular community or cultural group for social, cultural or spiritual reasons.

The place has a strong and special religious significance with a mainly islander community for cultural and spiritual reasons.

The place has a special association with the life or work of a particular person, group or organisation of importance in Queensland's history.

It has a close association with the work in the Torres Strait and New Guinea of the Order of Our Lady of the Sacred Heart, a Catholic congregation founded in France in the 1860s, and in particular with their founder, Fr Louis Andre Navarre; and with the early work of artist David Sing.
