= James Foley (bishop) =

Australian Catholic bishop (born 1948)

- Bishop Emeritus of Cairns
- Church: Catholic Church
- Diocese: Diocese of Cairns
- In office: 16 July 1992 – 21 August 2022
- Predecessor: John Bathersby
- Successor: Joe Caddy

Orders
- Ordination: 7 August 1973 by Francis Roberts Rush
- Consecration: 21 August 1992 by John Bathersby

Personal details
- Born: 19 July 1948 (age 78) Brisbane, Queensland, Australia, British Empire
- Coat of arms

James Foley (born 19 July 1948) is an Australian prelate of the Catholic Church who was the Bishop of Cairns in Queensland from 1992 to 2022.

== Biography ==
James Foley was born in Brisbane on 19 July 1948. His mother was the distinguished lawyer Clare Foley. He was educated at the St Ignatius Parish School at Toowong and at Marist College at Ashgrove. He was ordained a priest on 7 August 1973. From 1976 to 1982 he studied at the University of Louvain, earning a licentiate and a doctorate in philosophy. During those years he also served as a chaplain on British and American military bases in West Germany.

Returning to Australia, he began teaching at Banyo Seminary in 1982. He also taught occasionally at Brisbane College of Theology, the Australian Catholic University, and the University of Queensland. He served as spiritual director for students at the University of Queensland from 1985 to 1992. From 1982 to 1987 he also assisted at the country parish in Beaudesert. He was also a member the International Catechetical Commission and the International Committee for English in the Liturgy.

Pope John Paul II appointed him bishop of Cairns on 16 July 1992. He received his episcopal consecration on 21 August 1992 in St. Monica's Cathedral in Cairns from Archbishop John Bathersby of Brisbane.

In 2004 he joined four other Queensland bishops in a pastoral letter "Let the Many Coastlands Be Glad" that called for the protection of the Great Barrier Reef. He renewed that call in 2016.

In 2008, he supported plans to construct a mosque in Cairns, replacing a worker's cottage the Islamic community was using. He said it would be "highly desirable neighbour".

In 2015 he endorsed the work of the national commission investigating child sexual abuse. He called it a "healthy" process and said he was learning "disturbing" things about people he thought highly of decades earlier.

On 29 April 2019, Foley organized an interfaith prayer service in his cathedral called Interfaith, Multicultural Celebration for Peace and Harmony. Buddhist and Islamic representatives participated. He said Catholics who protested the event were promoting "ignorance and bigotry". He said: "I'm concerned about what is influencing these people.... There has never been a greater need for people with different faiths to come together."

He was a lifelong supporter of the Labor Party–his grandfather Edward Pender had been an activist on behalf of social legislation. Foley said he believed the party "best represented Catholic social teaching" but in 2020 he objected to the party's support for "voluntary assisted dying" legislation.

In November 2021, Foley denounced Catholics who objected to vaccination against COVID-19. He said: "In almost 30 years in this position, I've never encountered such divisiveness and, dare I say, ignorance.... What worries me too, in these conversations, is that they seem to entail all sorts of other major conspiracy theories."

Pope Francis accepted his resignation on 21 August 2022. Foley had submitted his resignation in 2019 after being diagnosed with Parkinson's disease. That year he was relieved of his positions with the Australian Bishops Conference, where he served on the Commissions for Catholic Education, for Evangelisation, Laity and Ministry; and for Life, Family and Public Engagement.
