= Adolphus Lecaille =

Catholic priest

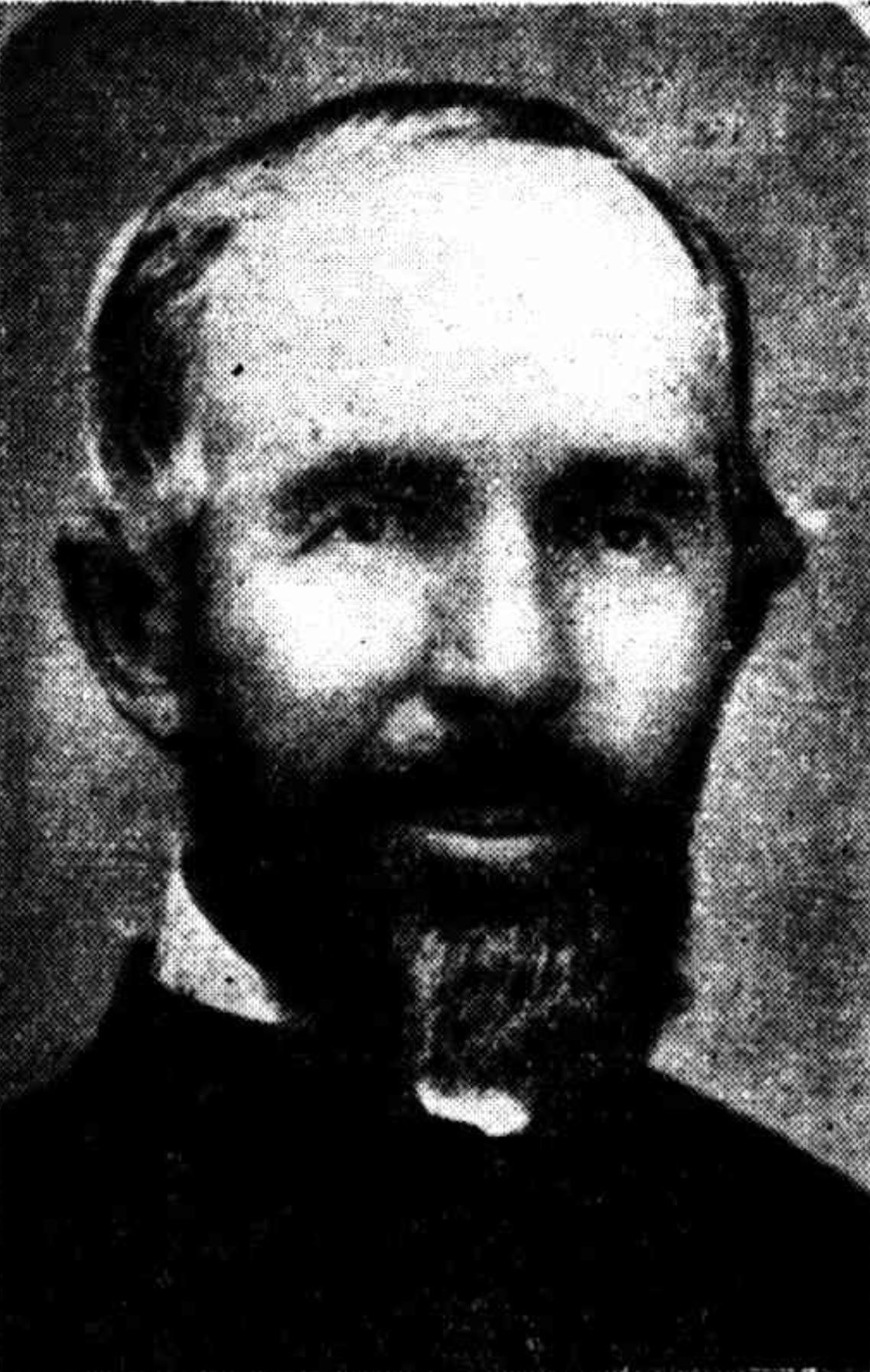
Adolphus Joseph Lecaille

Adolphus Joseph Lecaille (c. 1825 – 1908) was a Catholic priest. He was one of the pioneer priests in the Roman Catholic Diocese of Geraldton in Western Australia.

== Early life ==
Adolphus Joseph Lecaille was born in Belgium. He expressed a vocation for the priesthood at an early age. Following his initial education in Belgium, he was then sent to Rome, Italy, to attend the Pontificio Collegio Urbano de Propaganda Fide, which trained missionaries to spread Catholicism through the world. There he studied mathematics, classics, philosophy and theology . He was ordained as a priest in 1856.

== Religious life ==
Lecaille came to West Australia in 1858 when John Brady was Bishop of Perth and Joseph Serra was coadjutor-bishop. After a year in Bunbury, Lecaille was appointed to the charge of Greenough, a district including the little port of Geraldton, and in 1859 he arrived upon the scene of his main lifework. He was constantly on the move through the various Greenough settlements, Geraldton and Northampton, nor did he forget the scattered members of his flock far away in the lonely bush. It was before the development of the railways, and the bush tracks were very rough and difficult for any wheeled vehicles. Lecaille established churches and schools in:

- Greenough (St. Peter's)
- Bootenal
- Dongarra (St Thomas')
- Nabawa
- Northampton
- Geraldton
- Irwin

The first St. Peter's church at Greenough was opened in 1866 and cost £233. It has since been pulled down.

At Geraldton the foundation stone of St Francis Xavier's Church was laid in 1870. This same stone was re-laid by Bishop Kelly in 1918 in the base of the north-west tower of the St Francis Xavier Cathedral.

Following the discovery of gold near Cooktown in Queensland in 1872 and the establishment and growth of sugar production during the 1870s, the Bishop of Brisbane, James Quinn petitioned the Roman Curia to create a vicariate in north Queensland to minister to Catholics in the region and to evangelise the Aborigines. The Vicariate Apostolic of Queensland was officially created on 27 January 1877 by Pope Pius IX. The Vicariate consisted of all the land in Queensland north of the line starting at Cape Hinchinbrook and then west to the border with South Australia (now Northern Territory). Lecaille was appointed the first Apostolic Pro-Vicar of the Queensland vicariate with Reverend Father Tarquin Tanganelli as the rector. Lecaille was to be based in Cooktown while Tanganelli was to be based at the Hodgkinson Minerals Area to minister to the needs of the miners and establish churches there. Due to a breakdown in communication, the news of the new Vicariate does not appear to have reached Australia until the arrival of Tanganelli and two other Italian priests in November 1877 to serve in the Vicariate. Lecaille (who was then based in Geraldton) did not take up his appointment in Queensland but remains recorded as holding the position from February to November 1877.

As the years went by, the Catholic population in the Geraldton area grew in numbers and other priests were sent to assist. The Holy See then decided to excise this northern area from the Perth Diocese and created the Diocese of Geraldton on 30 January 1898. It needed a pioneering bishop and, as Lecaille was a zealous archdeacon, he was offered the bishopric. Father Lecaille requested permission to decline the honour. He was getting old and worn out by his long years of work.

== Later life ==
Soon after the appointment of William Bernard Kelly as bishop, Lecaille journeyed down to Perth to undertake less arduous duties. He was chaplain to the Order of the Good Shepherd and at the Loretto Convent on Adelaide Terrace. Then he became ill and spent the last two years of his life being cared for by the Sisters at St John of God Hospital. Lecaille died on Thursday 7 May 1908 aged 83 years. He was buried on Saturday 9 May 1908 in the grounds of St Joseph's Orphanage. A Requiem Mass was held for him in Geraldton.

In recognition of Lecaille's commitment and contribution to the Geraldton Diocese, on Friday 8 June 1936 the Bishop of Geraldton, James O'Collins, exhumed Lecaille's remains from the graveyard at St Joseph's Orphanage and transferred them to Geraldton to be interred in a new mortuary chapel of St Francis Xavier's Cathedral. This chapel was built under the supervision of Dean John Hawes as its architect. The Bishop directed that Holy Mass should be celebrated there once a month for the souls of those buried in the Catholic portion of the cemetery at Utakarra, then about 3 miles (4.8 km) out of the city. The mortuary chapel is 50 by 15 feet (15.2 by 4.6 m) on the interior. It is built of stone with a vaulted roof.
