= Joe Caddy =

Australian Roman Catholic bishop

The Most Reverend Joe Caddy AM
- Bishop of the Roman Catholic Diocese of Cairns
- Church: Catholic Church
- Diocese: Cairns
- Appointed: 6 June 2024
- Installed: 15 August 2024
- Predecessor: James Foley

Orders
- Ordination: 25 August 1990
- Consecration: 15 August 2024 by Mark Coleridge

Personal details
- Born: Joseph John Caddy; 14 January 1960 (age 66) Melbourne, Australia
- Denomination: Roman Catholic
- Education: Melbourne University of Divinity Pontifical Gregorian University
- Motto: Latin: Esurientes Implevit Bonis, lit. '(He fills the hungry with good things)'
- Coat of arms

Styles of Joe Caddy
- Reference style: The Most Reverend
- Spoken style: My Lord
- Religious style: Bishop

Joe Caddy AM (born 14 January 1960) is an Australian bishop. He is currently the bishop of the Roman Catholic Diocese of Cairns. He was previously vicar general of the Roman Catholic Archdiocese of Melbourne.

== Early life ==
Joseph John Caddy was born on 14 January 1960 and was raised in Ivanhoe East. He attended St Stephen's Primary School, Cathedral College and Parade College. After graduating, he enrolled to study commerce at the University of Melbourne, then in 1984 entered Corpus Christi College Seminary.

== Priesthood ==
Caddy was ordained a priest for the Archdiocese of Melbourne on 25 August 1990 at St Patrick’s Cathedral Melbourne, Victoria. He served as an assistant priest at Our Lady of Perpetual Help, Maidstone. In 1993 he moved to Rome to study at the Pontifical Gregorian University.

He returned to Melbourne and served as a prison chaplain. He was administrator of CatholicCare Victoria from 2004 to 2017. He served as parish priest of All Saints, Fitzroy from 2014 to 2016, before being appointed to St Mary's, Saint Kilda East from 2016 to 2019. He was appointed Episcopal Vicar for Social Services in 2016 and Vicar General in 2019, while also serving as parish priest of Saint Carthage's, Parkville from 2021.

Caddy was appointed a Member of the Order of Australia in the 2018 Queen's Birthday Honours.

== Episcopacy ==
On 6 June 2024, Pope Francis announced Caddy had been appointed Bishop of Cairns. The seat had been vacant since 2022 following the resignation of Bishop James Foley, after being diagnosed with Parkinson's disease, in 2019.

Caddy was ordained and installed as the eighth Bishop of Cairns at St Monica's War Memorial Cathedral on 15 August 2024, by Brisbane Archbishop Mark Coleridge.

Catholic Church titles
Preceded by James Foley	Bishop of Cairns; 2024–present
