= James Murray (vicar apostolic of Cooktown) =

Roman Catholic priest (1847 – 1914)

James Dominic Murray (2 January 1847 – 13 February 1914) was a Roman Catholic priest in Queensland, Australia. He was the Vicar Apostolic of Cooktown (a precursor role of Bishop of Cairns) from 28 March 1898 to his death on 13 February 1914.

== Early life ==
Murray was born on 2 January 1847 in Mullingar, County Westmead, Ireland. He was educated by the Christian Brothers and at St Finians Seminary at Navan.

== Religious life ==
Murray entered the Order of Saint Augustine and completed his studies in Rome. He was ordained a priest on 22 December 1887. He served at St Monica's Priory in Hoxton, London, England. He arrived in North Queensland in 1884 serving in the Vicariate Apostolic of Cooktown (the precursor of the Diocese of Cairns) for several years before being appointed Pastor and Prior in Echuca, Victoria.

On 28 March 1898, Murray was appointed Vicar Apostolic of Cooktown (a precursor role of Bishop of Cairns) and his consecration took place in Bendigo Cathedral on 3 July 1898. He held the office to his death on 13 February 1914.

Circa 1904, he relocated the headquarters of the vicariate from Cooktown to Cairns, as Cairns was becoming the more populous and more prosperous town.

== Later life ==
Murray died in Cairns on 13 February 1914. His remains were taken to Cooktown on Wednesday 18 February 1914, where a requiem mass was held in St Mary's Catholic Church followed by his burial in Cooktown Cemetery.
