= John Hutchinson (bishop) =

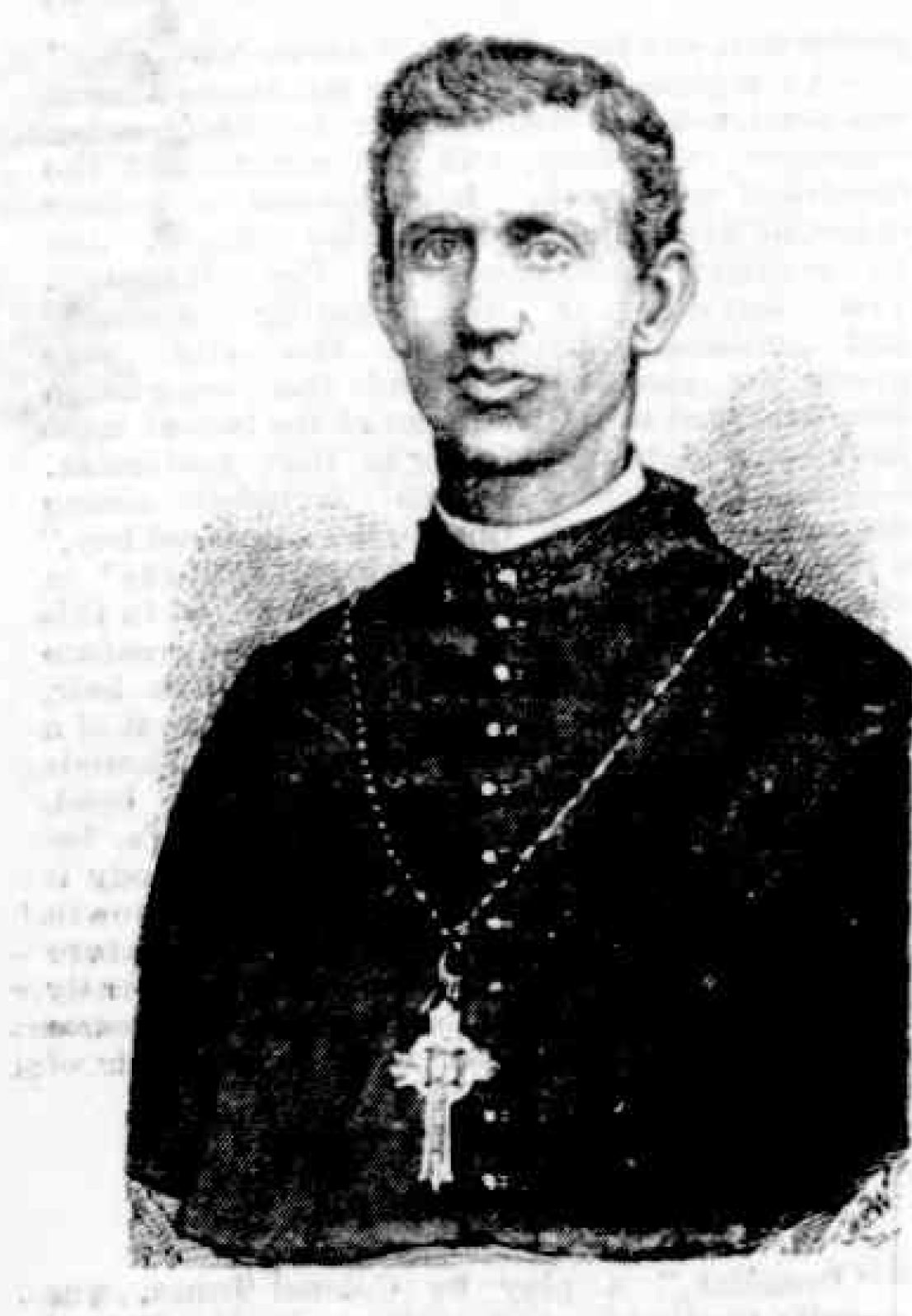
John Hutchinson, Bishop of Cooktown, 1889

John Hutchinson (1837–1897) was a Roman Catholic priest. From 1884 to 1897 he was Vicar Apostolic and Bishop of Cooktown in Queensland, Australia.

== Early life ==
Hutchinson was born on 2 January 1837 in Thomastown, County Kilkenny, Ireland, the son of James Hutchinson and Mary (née Cummings).

== Religion life ==
Hutchison entered the Augustinian Order in 1861 and was ordained a priest on 30 October 1865. Father Hutchinson served for some years in the Augustinian Mission of St Monica, in Hoxton in the East End of London. In 1872 he was appointed first Prior of the newly appointed Novitiate and Home of Studies, St. Augustine's, Rathfarmham, near Dublin. At the provincial chapter of his order held in Dublin in 1883, Father Hutchinson was unanimously elected Prior-Provincial of the Irish Augustinian Province.

In January 1884, he was appointed by Papal brief as Vicar-Apostolic of the Vicariate of Cooktown in Cooktown, Far North Queensland, Australia. Hutchison left immediately for Cooktown accompanied by Fathers O'Byrne and Murrayn. In 1885 he assisted at the Plenary Council of the Australia Bishops held in Sydney.

In 1887 the role of Vicar Apostolic of Cooktown was raised by the Pope to the status of a Bishop. On 28 August 1887 Hutchinson was consecrated as Bishop by Cardinal Patrick Moran in St Mary's Cathedral in Sydney.

The success of the Vicariate of Cooktown demonstrated his zeal and administrative ability. In 1888 he invited the Sisters of Mercy to establish a community in Cooktown where a new convent was erected at a cost of £65,000. Under Hutchinson, many new churches were established.

== Later life and death ==
In February 1897 Hutchison contracted dengue fever and never fully recovered. In June 1897 he undertook a 2,600-mile (4,200 km) journey travelling with the Redemptorist Fathers' Mission, which caused the "utter collapse" of his health. Hutchinson died in Cooktown on 28 October 1897. A requiem mass and funeral was held for him in Cooktown. Other requiem mass ceremonies also held in St Stephen's Cathedral in Brisbane and also in Rockhampton.
