= John Heavey =

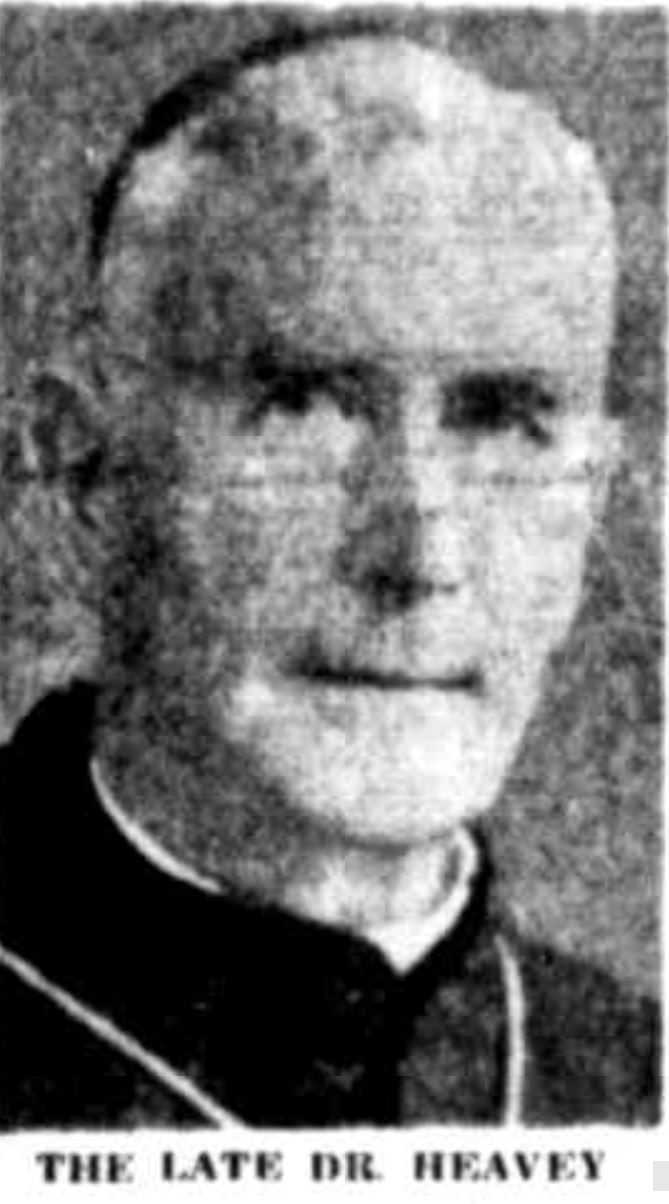
John Heavey

John Alphonsus Heavey (1868–1948) was a Roman Catholic bishop in Queensland, Australia. He was the Vicar Apostolic of Cooktown and the Roman Catholic Bishop of Cairns.

== Early life ==
Heavey was born on 13 November 1868 in Roundwood, County Wicklow, Ireland or in Ballyhaunis, County Mayo.

== Religious life ==
Heavey was ordained as a Roman Catholic priest in Rome as a member of the Augustinian Order on 23 May 1891. He served as professor and prior of the order in County Wexford, Ireland, before being appointed in 1914 as Vicar Apostolic of Cooktown in North Queensland, Australia. At the time the Vicariate Apostolic of Cooktown was established in 1877, Cooktown was expected to become the major town in North Queensland, but his predecessor Bishop James Murray had relocated the headquarters of the vicariate to Cairns circa 1904, as it had become the major town in the area.

Heavey's journey to Australia involved a number of misadventures. On his first voyage a buoy was hit that caused damage to the ship's hull and it began to take on water and had to return for repairs. When the ship departed again, it collided with a Belgian ship, but was found not to have sustained significant damage, so the journey continued, but news of German warship SMS Emden being in the vicinity (World War I having commenced) required the ship to travel with "lights out" until arriving at Fremantle in January 1915.

In 1941, the Vicariate Apostolic of Cooktown was elevated to become the Diocese of Cairns with Heavey as its first bishop.

== Death ==
On 12 June 1948, Heavey died in Cairns. His funeral was held at St Monica's Cathedral in Cairns with the panegyric preached by Archbishop of Brisbane James Duhig. He was buried in the Martyn Street Cemetery in Cairns.

== See also ==
- Catholic Church in Australia
