= Diocese of Cairns =

Latin Catholic territory in Australia

Diocese of Cairns Dioecesis Cairnensis

Location
- Country: Australia
- Territory: Far North region of Queensland
- Ecclesiastical province: Brisbane
- Metropolitan: Brisbane
- Coordinates: 16°55′00″S 145°46′21″E

Statistics
- Area: 377,000 km^{2} (146,000 sq mi)
- Population: Total; Catholics: (as of 2006); ▲235,396; ▲59,912 (▼25.5%%)
- Parishes: 24

Information
- Denomination: Catholic Church
- Sui iuris church: Latin Church
- Rite: Roman Rite
- Established: 1877 as Vicariate Apostolic of Queensland; 10 May 1887 as Vicariate Apostolic of Cooktown; 8 July 1941 as Diocese of Cairns
- Cathedral: St Monica's Cathedral, Cairns

Current leadership
- Pope: Leo XIV
- Bishop: Joe Caddy
- Bishops emeritus: James Foley

Map

Website
- Roman Catholic Diocese of Cairns

The Diocese of Cairns is a Latin Church diocese of the Catholic Church located in the state of Queensland, Australia. It is a suffragan diocese of the Archdiocese of Brisbane. The diocese was erected as a vicariate apostolic in 1877 and was elevated to a diocese in 1941. Its territorial remit is Far North Queensland.

St Monica's Cathedral is the seat of the Catholic Bishop of Cairns. On 6 June, 2024, it was announced that Joe Caddy, formerly Vicar general of the Archdiocese of Melbourne, has been appointed as bishop of Cairns.

== History ==
Following the discovery of gold near Cooktown in 1872 and the establishment and growth of sugar production during the 1870s, the Bishop of Brisbane, James Quinn, visited Cooktown in 1874. The first church was opened a year later. Quinn had earlier been petitioning the Roman Curia to create a vicariate in north Queensland to minister to Catholics in the region and to evangelise the Aborigines, with the Vicariate Apostolic of Queensland officially created on 27 January 1877 by Pope Pius IX. The Vicariate consisted of all the land in Queensland north of the line starting at Cape Hinchinbrook and then west to the border with South Australia (now Northern Territory). The Very Reverend Adolphus Lecaille, then the Vicar-General in the Diocese of Perth in Western Australia, was appointed the first Apostolic Pro-Vicar of the Queensland vicariate with Reverend Father Tarquin Tanganelli as the rector. Lecaille was to be based in Cooktown while Tanganelli was to be based at the Hodgkinson Minerals Area to minister to the needs of the miners and establish churches there. Due to a breakdown in communication, the news of the new Vicariate does not appear to have reached Australia until the arrival of Tanganelli and two other Italian priests in November 1877 to serve in the Vicariate. Lecaille (who was then based in Geraldton in Western Australia) never took up his appointment in Queensland.

An initial attempt to install Italian priests from the Pontifical Seminary of the Apostles Saints Peter and Paul of Rome was a failure; mainly due to cultural and language issues with both the indigenous and predominantly Irish lay population. Quinn, from Ireland, appointed one of his fellow countryman, John Cani as the first Pro-Vicar who served up until Quinn's death in 1882 when Cani returned to Brisbane before being appointed as the first Bishop of Rockhampton. A short term under Monsignor Paul Fortini followed, marked by his clash with the laity in Herberton which he then placed under interdict in 1883; this meant that sacraments could not be celebrated in that town. Fortini was recalled to Rome.

A stable period followed under the pastoral care of the Augustinians. The number of parishioners grew from approximately 2,000 (in 1884) to about 4,000 (in the 1890s); and to approximately 10,000 Catholics (by 1914) spread across eight church districts with 13 priests. The growth of pastoral industries and mining in the interwar years led to the expansion of the Vicariate west across the Atherton Tablelands and the creation of an additional nine parishes; and eventual establishment as a suffragan diocese in 1941.

== Ordinaries ==
The following individuals have been elected as Roman Catholic Bishop of Cairns, or any of its precursor titles:

| Order | Name | Title | Date enthroned | Reign ended | Term of office | Reason for term end |
|---|---|---|---|---|---|---|
| 1 | Adolphus Lecaille † | Pro-Vicar Apostolic of Queensland | February 1877 | November 1877 | 10 months | Did not take possession |
| 2 | Tarquino Tanganelli † | Pro-Vicar Apostolic of Queensland | May 1878 | August 1878 | 4 months | |
| 3 | John Cani † | Pro-Vicar Apostolic of Queensland | 30 January 1877 | 3 January 1882 | 4 years, 338 days | Elevated to Bishop of Rockhampton |
| 4 | Paul Fortini † | Pro-Vicar Apostolic of Queensland | 12 February 1882 | 15 January 1884 | 1 year, 337 days | Recalled to Rome and appointed Vicar Apostolic Emeritus of Queensland |
| 5 | John Hutchinson, OSA † | Pro-Vicar Apostolic of Queensland | 15 January 1884 | 13 May 1887 | 3 years, 118 days | Elevated to Vicar Apostolic of Cooktown |
| 5 | John Hutchinson, OSA † | Vicar Apostolic of Cooktown | 13 May 1887 | 28 October 1897 | 10 years, 168 days | Died in office |
| 6 | James Murray, OSA † | Vicar Apostolic of Cooktown | 28 March 1898 | 13 February 1914 | 15 years, 322 days | Died in office |
| 7 | John Heavey, OSA † | Vicar Apostolic of Cooktown | 3 May 1914 | 14 July 1941 | 27 years, 72 days | Elevated to Bishop of Cairns |
| 7 | John Heavey, OSA † | Bishop of Cairns | 14 July 1941 | 12 June 1948 | 6 years, 334 days | Died in office |
| 8 | Thomas Cahill † | Bishop of Cairns | 11 November 1948 | 13 April 1967 | 18 years, 153 days | Elevated to Archbishop of Canberra (and Goulburn) |
| 9 | John Ahern Torpie † | Bishop of Cairns | 14 September 1967 | 5 August 1985 | 17 years, 325 days | Retired and appointed Bishop Emeritus of Cairns |
| 10 | John Bathersby † | Bishop of Cairns | 17 January 1986 | 3 December 1991 | 5 years, 320 days | Elevated to Archbishop of Brisbane |
| 11 | James Foley | Bishop of Cairns | 16 July 1992 | 21 August 2022 | 30 years, 36 days | Retired and Appointed Bishop Emeritus of Cairns |
| 12 | Joe Caddy | Bishop of Cairns | 22 August 2024 | — | 2 years, 92 days | |

== Parishes ==
The diocese is divided into three separate deaneries that administer individual parishes:

1. The Northern deanery is formed of the following parishes Cairns (St Monica's Cathedral), Edmonton (St Therese's in Bentley Park), Earlville (Our Lady Help of Christians), Gordonvale (St Michael), West Cairns (St Francis Xavier's in Manunda), Mossman & Port Douglas (St Augustine's in Mossman, and St Mary's in Port Douglas), North Cairns (Mother of Good Counsel), Northern Beaches (Holy Cross in Trinity Park, Sacred Heart in Freshwater, and St Augustine's in Stratford), and Parramatta Park (St Joseph's).
2. The Southern deanery is based on the Cassowary Coast with parishes at Babinda (St Rita's), Innisfail (Mother of Good Counsel), Mourilyan & South Johnstone (Christ the King at Mourilyan, and St Rita's at South Johnstone), Silkwood (St John's), and Tully (St Clare of Montefalco in Tully, Our Lady Star of the Sea in Cardwell, and Holy Spirit at Wongaling Beach).
3. The Western deanery extends west of the Tablelands with parishes: Atherton (St Joseph), Cooktown (St Mary), Dimbulah (St Anthony), Georgetown (St Patrick), Gulf Savannah (Our Lady Help of Christians), Herberton (St Patrick), Malanda (St James in Malanda, Our Lady of Consolation in Yungaburra, and St Rita in Millaa Millaa), Mareeba (St Thomas of Villanova in Mareeba, and St Christopher's in Kuranda), Ravenshoe (St Teresa of the Child Jesus in Ravenshoe, and Holy Rosary in Mount Garnet), Weipa (St Joseph), and Thursday Island (including Our Lady of the Sacred Heart Church on Thursday Island, St Joseph's on Hammond Island, Holy Family on Horn Island).

== See also ==
- Catholic Education Cairns
- Catholic Church in Australia
