= Nelson Po =

Australian-Filipino Latin Catholic bishop (born 1968)

The Most Reverend Nelson Po
- Auxiliary Bishop of Perth
- Archdiocese: Perth
- Appointed: 2 February 2026
- Installed: 16 April 2026
- Other post: Titular Bishop of Aguntum

Orders
- Ordination: 9 December 2005 by Barry Hickey
- Consecration: 16 April 2026 by Timothy Costelloe

Personal details
- Born: Nelson Abordo Po; 5 June 1968 (age 58) Palompon, Leyte, Philippines
- Denomination: Catholic Church
- Education: Leyte Institute of Technology; Ateneo de Davao University
- Motto: Ambulare humiliter cum Deo (Latin for 'Walk humbly with God')

Styles of Nelson Po
- Reference style: The Most Reverend
- Spoken style: His Lordship or My Lord Bishop
- Religious style: Bishop

Nelson Abordo Po (born 5 June 1968) is a Filipino-born Australian Catholic bishop. He has served as auxiliary bishop of the Archdiocese of Perth since 2026. His episcopal consecration took place on 16 April 2026.

== Early life ==
Po was born in Leyte, in the Philippines, the third child of six children of Norma Abordo and Lope Po. He was awarded a degree in industrial engineering from the Leyte Institute of Technology in Tacloban and initially pursued a career as an engineer before joining the Blessed Sacrament Congregation. He studied philosophy at the Ateneo de Davao University in Davao City and completed a master's degree in theology at the Maryhill School of Theology in Manila. In 2003, he was invited by Archbishop Barry Hickey to continue his studies for the priesthood as a seminarian for the Archdiocese of Perth.

== Priesthood ==
Po was ordained on 9 December 2005 by Archbishop Barry Hickey at St Mary's Cathedral, Perth as a priest for the Archdiocese of Perth. He was one of nine priests ordained in the same ceremony, the largest number of ordinands in a single ordination ceremony in the cathedral's history. His first appointment was as assistant priest of St Mary's Parish, Kalgoorlie.

In 2008, he was appointed chaplain of the Royal Perth Hospital and in 2010, became parish priest of Cloverdale. In 2016, he was appointed parish priest of Applecross.

== Episcopate ==
On 2 February 2026, Po was appointed auxiliary bishop of the Archdiocese of Perth by Pope Leo XIV.

He was ordained as a bishop on 16 April 2026 at St Mary's Cathedral, Perth. Archbishop Timothy Costelloe SDB was the principal consecrator along with Bishop Donald Sproxton, auxiliary bishop of Perth, and Bishop Rene Ramirez RCJ, who was also born in the Philippines.
