= Donald Sproxton =

Auxiliary bishop of Perth

The Most Reverend Donald Sproxton
- Auxiliary Bishop of the Roman Catholic Archdiocese of Perth
- Diocese: Perth
- Appointed: 12 December 2001
- Installed: 21 February 2002

Orders
- Ordination: 17 December 1977 by Archbishop Launcelot Goody
- Consecration: 21 February 2002 by Archbishop Barry Hickey

Personal details
- Born: Donald George Sproxton; 7 February 1953 (age 73) Subiaco, Perth, Western Australia
- Denomination: Roman Catholic
- Education: St Charles' Seminary, Perth; St Francis Xavier Seminary, Adelaide
- Motto: Duc In Altum (Put out into the deep)

Styles of Donald Sproxton
- Reference style: The Most Reverend
- Spoken style: My Lord
- Religious style: Bishop

Donald Sproxton (born 7 February 1953) is the auxiliary bishop of the Roman Catholic Archdiocese of Perth. He was consecrated by Archbishop Barry Hickey at St Mary's Cathedral, Perth on 21 February 2002.

== Early life ==
Sproxton was born at St John of God Hospital, Subiaco on 7 February 1953. He was the oldest of two children born to Henry Sproxton and Thema (née Clarke). He received his primary education at St Columba's School from 1959, until the family moved to Morley in 1963 and he continued his schooling at Christian Brothers High School, Bedford, where he graduated in 1970.

== Priesthood ==
Sproxton commenced his formation for the priesthood in 1971, entering St Charles' Seminary, Guildford where he studied philosophy. He was sent to St Francis Xavier Seminary, Adelaide in 1974. He was ordained to the diaconate in March 1977 and upon completed his theological studies, returned to Perth where he served as a deacon at St Mary's Cathedral, Perth.

He was ordained to the priesthood on 17 December 1977 by Archbishop Launcelot Goody and appointed to serve at St Mary's Cathedral as an assistant priest. While serving there, he also ministered at Royal Perth Hospital and at Trinity and Mercedes Colleges as chaplain. He was appointed Master of Ceremonies at the Cathedral in 1980 and then secretary to Archbishop Goody in 1981. He remained secretary to the Archbishop, following the retirement of Goody and the appointment of Archbishop William Foley. In 1986, he was asked to reside at St Charles' Seminary to assist the director of vocations residence.

He became parish priest of Wongan Hills-Dalwallinu in 1988. He was appointed parish priest of Mirrabooka in 1993.

== Episcopacy ==
On 12 December 2001, Pope John Paul II announced Sproxton would be appointed auxiliary bishop of the Archdiocese of Perth. He was ordained a bishop of 21 February 2002 at St Mary's Cathedral, Perth by Archbishop Barry Hickey. He was given the titular see of Timici.

Catholic Church titles
| Preceded by John F. Du | — TITULAR — Titular Bishop of Timici; 2001-present | Incumbent |
| Preceded by | Auxiliary Bishop of Perth; 2019–present | Incumbent |
