= Joseph Serra y Juliá =

Spanish Benedictine Catholic bishop

The Most Reverend Joseph Serra y Juliá OSB
- Coadjutor Bishop Emeritus of Perth
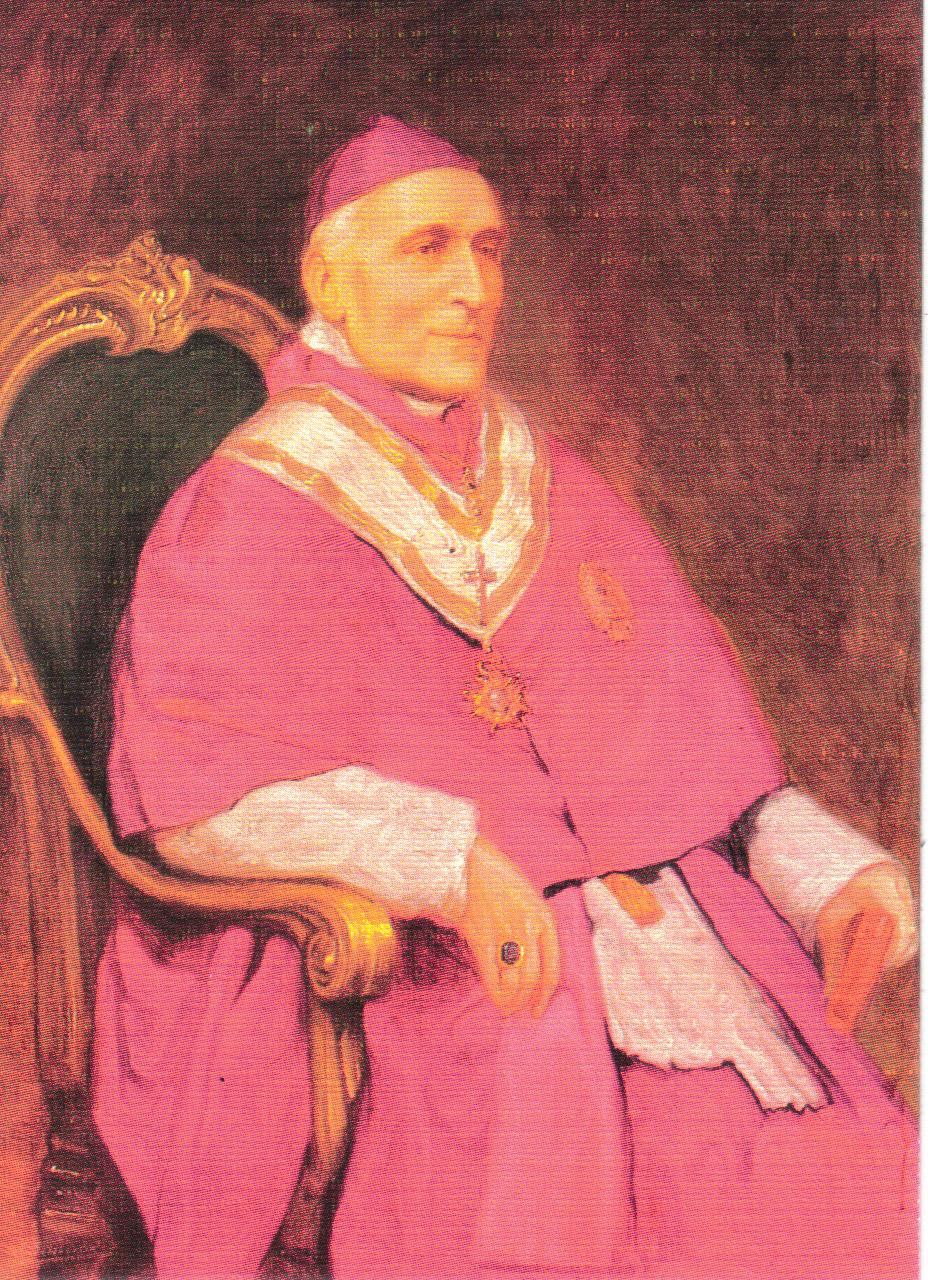
- Archdiocese: Perth
- Installed: 7 August 1849
- Term ended: 7 January 1862
- Other posts: Titular Bishop of Daulis (1849–1886), Bishop of Victoria (1847–1849)

Orders
- Ordination: 19 March 1835 by Rafael Téllez
- Consecration: 15 August 1848 at Pontificio Collegio Urbano de Propaganda Fide Chapel, Rome by Giacomo Filippo Fransoni

Personal details
- Born: José Eduardo y Antonio Serra y Juliá; 11 March 1811 Mataró, Catalonia, Spain
- Died: 8 September 1886 (aged 75) Benicàssim, Valencia, Spain
- Buried: Ciempozuelos, Community of Madrid, Spain
- Denomination: Catholic Church
- Occupation: Catholic bishop

Joseph Serra y Juliá or Joseph Benedict Serra (11 March 1811 – 8 September 1886) was a Spanish bishop, Benedictine missionary in Australia, founder of the Abbey of New Norcia and founder of the Oblates of the Most Holy Redeemer.

== Early life ==
Serra was born in Mataró, Spain, the youngest son of Joseph Serra Fuster, a merchant, and his wife Teresa Julia. He was orphaned at just 11 years of age and entered the Benedictine monastery of St Martin of Compostela at 16, taking the name Benedict. He was educated at the Monastery of Irache, Navarre.

== Priesthood ==
Serra was ordained on 19 March 1835 as a priest for the Order of Saint Benedict by Archbishop Rafael Téllez OFMCap, Archbishop of Santiago de Compostela. A few months after being ordained, he was forced to leave Spain to due the anti-clerical riots of 1835 and entered the La Trinità della Cava near Naples.

In 1844, Serra applied to be a missionary along with Dom Rosendo Salvado. The pair were assigned to join Bishop John Brady, the first Bishop of Perth, who led a large missionary party to Australia, reaching Perth in January 1846.

Serra and Salvado went into the bush to open a mission station 70 miles north of Perth in Victoria Plains, living alongside the local Aboriginal people. The foundation stone of the Abbey of New Norcia was laid on 1 March 1847 and Serra became its first superior.

In 1848, Serra left for Europe to collect funds for the mission.

== Episcopate ==
While in Europe, on 15 August 1848, he was consecrated as a bishop and appointed Bishop of Victoria, the diocese that would eventually become the Diocese of Darwin. On 7 August 1849, he was appointed Coadjutor Bishop of Perth. Salvado, who had remained in Perth, was ordained as Bishop of Victoria in his place.

Serra returned to Perth in December 1849 with 36 Spanish and Italian brothers and artisans.

In early 1850, tension had emerged between Serra and Bishop Brady. The two went to civil court over who rightfully owned the property and possessions of the New Norcia monastery. This tension had escalated by 1852. Brady was admonished for administering church property unwisely and suspended of his functions in October 1851 by Pope Pius IX by a motu proprio. He returned to Perth without permission and engaged in violent disputes with Serra. Serra believed he was now the rightful Bishop of Perth and barred Brady from entering church property, forcing the intervention of the local police.

The matter was only resolved when Archbishop John Bede Polding traveled from Sydney to address the matter. Brady withdrew to his native Diocese of Kilmore in Ireland and died without having resigned his see on 2 December 1871 at Amélie-les-Bains. Serra never formally assumed the title of Bishop of Perth, instead being Apostolic Administrator of the Diocese until his resignation was accepted in 1862.

As administrator, he worked hard to build up the Catholic Church in Western Australia. He built churches in Fremantle, Guildford, Toodyay, York, Dardanup, Albany and Bunbury. He also built a magnificent residence for the bishop and his priests in Perth.

By the late 1850s, tension had also emerged between Serra and Salvado. Serra was almost singularly focused on the Diocese of Perth, largely disregarding New Norcia. He established another monastery in Subiaco, much closer to Perth. Salvado remained focused on New Norcia and desired more assistance from his fellow Benedictine than he received.

On 7 January 1862, Serra resigned all his responsibilities to the church in Perth and returned to Europe.

=== Oblate Sisters of the Most Holy Redeemer ===
In 1864, Serra founded the Oblate Sisters of the Most Holy Redeemer along with Antonia de Oviedo Schöntal. It was formally instituted on 2 February 1870 and was founded to "work welcoming and instructing (girls), opening free kindergartens where they are received without any restriction". The order now largely works with women who have been victims of prostitution or sexual exploitation.

== Retirement and Death ==
Serra retired to Spain and worked to restore the Order of St Benedict in Spain. In 1869, he attended the First Vatican Council in Rome. For the rest of his life, he dedicated his work to his order. He retired to Castellón de la Plana and died there on 8 September 1886.

== Veneration ==
On 7 June 1894, his incorrupt remains were transferred to the chapel of the Ciempozuelos and the process of his beatification and canonisation were opened.

Catholic Church titles
Preceded by –	Bishop of Victoria; 1847–1849	Succeeded by Rosendo Salvado
Preceded by José Antonio Laureano de Zubiría	Titular Bishop of Daulia; 1849–1886	Succeeded by Antonio Maria Buglione
Preceded by –	Coadjutor Bishop of Perth; 1849–1862	Succeeded by –
