= Martin Griver =

Australian cleric (1814–1886)

The Right Reverend Martin Griver
- 2nd Roman Catholic Bishop
- Diocese: Perth
- Installed: 22 July 1873, Bishop of Perth
- Term ended: 1 November 1886
- Predecessor: John Brady
- Successor: Matthew Gibney

Orders
- Ordination: 17 December 1847 (Priest) in Spain
- Consecration: 12 June 1870, Titular Bishop of Tlos

Personal details
- Born: 11 November 1814 Granollers, Spain
- Died: 1 November 1886 (aged 72) Perth, Western Australia
- Buried: Cathedral of the Immaculate Conception of the Blessed Virgin Mary, Perth
- Denomination: Roman Catholic Church
- Occupation: Roman Catholic bishop
- Profession: Cleric
- Education: University of Barcelona, University of Cervera & Royal College of Surgeons, Barcelona

Martin Griver y Cuni (11 November 1814 in Granollers, Spain – 1 November 1886 in Perth, Western Australia), an Australian bishop, was the second Roman Catholic Bishop of Perth, serving from 1873 until his death in 1886.

== Early life in Spain ==
As a young man Martin studied Latin in his hometown of Granollers. In 1829 he entered a junior seminary in Vic where he concentrated on mathematics and logic. He then graduated to the major seminary in Barcelona and undertook seven years of theological training concluding in 1839. The last six years were accredited by the University of Cervera.

Following the completion of his theological studies he was unable to be ordained. The liberal and anticlerical Spanish government had published a ban on ordination in 1835 to reduce the size of the Catholic Church's clerical body, which in the previous century had reached approximately 200,000.

During the time he was unable to fulfill his vocation to become a priest, Griver studied medicine and surgery at the Royal College of Surgeons in Barcelona. He was awarded a bachelor's degree in philosophy specialising medicine in July 1845 and then in the same month received a bachelor's degree in medicine and surgery.

Finally, after much perseverance, in December 1847 he was ordained for the diocese of Girona. He was ordained for this diocese as he received a small benefice, a land holding for the support of clergy, from a previous employer the Marquis of Milan that was located within that diocese. He was also granted a licence to exercise his ministry in the diocese of Barcelona.

After a brief period as a curate in his home parish of San Esteban he volunteered for Western Australia. Travelling from Spain with Joseph Serra, Griver arrived in Fremantle, Western Australia, and applied his knowledge of medicine together with his religious fervour from Albany to Geraldton, as well as across Perth.

An 1846 establishment of a Benedictine mission in New Norcia by Griver's compatriot, Rosendo Salvado, was not supported by Serra and created tensions in the sprawling colony. Appointed Administrator of the Diocese, Griver was charged with the responsibility for separating the activities of the mission from the diocese and facilitating equitable access to funding for Church schools. In 1865, as administrator, Griver completed the first stage of construction of the Cathedral of the Immaculate Conception (St Mary's), Perth.

== Bishop of Perth ==
Travelling to Rome for the First Vatican Council In 1869, Griver was appointed Titular Bishop of Tlos and consecrated the following year; changing to Perth following the death of Brady in 1871.

During 1885 Griver attended the first Plenary Council of Australasia along with fourteen other bishops and fifty-two theologians. During the Council he advocated for the establishment of the Kimberley region as an apostolic vicariate. Due to his age and health, while in Sydney he also proposed three possible candidates for the position of co-adjutor bishop of Perth. The proposed names included Father Matthew Gibney, the future third Bishop of Perth.

He died while in office on 1 November 1886 and was buried in St Mary's Cathedral.

=== Exhumation ===
During 2006, as part of the restoration of St Mary's, Bishop Griver's remains were exhumed from a brick lined grave by a group of archaeologists under the supervision of Fr Robert Cross and Dr Shane Burke. His successor Bishop Matthew Gibney was buried beside him.

Catholic Church titles
Preceded by John Brady	2nd Catholic Bishop of Perth; 1873–1886	Succeeded by Matthew Gibney
