= Diocese of Perth =

Diocese of Perth or Archdiocese of Perth could refer to:

- Anglican Diocese of Perth
- Roman Catholic Archdiocese of Perth
