= History of Aquinas College =

The history of Aquinas College is linked to the establishment of the Christian Brothers' College, Perth (CBC Perth) that was founded in 1894, located in the Perth central business district. CBC Perth was one of the first boarding schools in Western Australia. In 1937, it was decided that a more suitable location was needed to cater for boarding students, and Aquinas College, Perth opened in the following year.

Today, Aquinas College is an independent Roman Catholic single-sex primary and secondary day and boarding school for boys, located at Salter Point, Perth, Western Australia.

== Early days ==
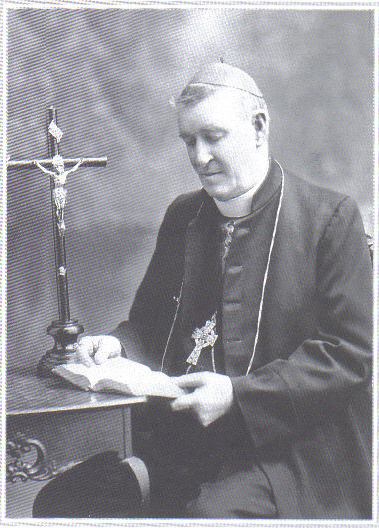
Bishop Matthew Gibney, a key supporter of CBC Perth

Catholic secondary education for boys' was a marginal concern in the small rural society of the former Swan River Colony. Bishop Matthew Gibney and the prosperous Catholic families who had lobbied for the Congregation of Christian Brothers to be invited to Perth wanted to convert the previously haphazard arrangements for boys schooling into a secure arrangement. In 1893, Bishop Gibney met with Brother Treacy, the provincial of the Christian Brothers in Australia in Adelaide and successfully persuaded him to establish a community in Perth. Gibney had petitioned the brothers regularly ever since they had opened a boys school in Melbourne in 1871. Christian Brothers' College (CBC Perth) opened on 31 January 1894.

From the earliest days, the Christian Brothers received and acknowledged crucial support from members of the Catholic community. In order to raise funds, the Brothers sent a young member of the community Brother Regis Hughes, on two extensive journeys in 1896 and 1897 to let Catholics know of the Brothers' work and need to money. The first journey in January 1896 ended with Hughes returning ill from sunstroke, returning to the college until April to recover, between April and October 1896, Hughes toured the South West of Western Australia and the goldfields, records note that the "people subscribed freely" and the journey raised £2,000. The college's beginnings on the corner of St Georges Terrace and Victoria Avenue were small, classes began with two teachers and five students on Monday morning, numbers swelled to twenty-five by the following morning. Lessons were conducted in small buildings set on land adjoining government house.

The opening ceremony on 1 February 1894 reflected both the fragility of the venture and that time, effort and dogged sacrifice would make it succeed. The opening brought together a crowd of well-wishers; The Premier of Western Australia, Lord Mayor of Perth, Catholic and Protestant members of the parliament, the headmaster of the High School (now Hale School), as well as mothers and fathers of potential students to mark the new venture. The headmaster, Brother Anthony O'Brien warned parents not to expect too much too soon and urged the Catholic community to give students and teachers time to prove themselves The need to establish a legitimate presence as a secondary school both within the church and the broader Western Australian community dominated the opening decade of CBC Perth.

Brother Michael Paul Nunan was headmaster at CBC Perth for a total of twenty-one years over three appointments, such a long period in office was unusual among the headmasters of the college, a steady rotation of men through the headmasters' job was linked to the Christian Brothers' philosophy of individual anonymity in the service of the church. His enthusiastic and engaging personality, and strength in public relations, playing a key role in the establishment of the Public Schools Association in 1905. The personal friendship between Brother Nunan and Peter Anderson, the principal of Scotch College, not only fostered an amicable rivalry between the two schools but also consolidated the Catholics perception that they had a legitimate place within the small group of colleges in Perth. His policy of enrolling a substantial number of Jewish and non-Catholic students without requiring them to attend Catholic instruction classes, raised some eyebrows in Catholic circles. However, shaky finances and his energy for the success of the educational enterprise, were strong counter arguments.

== Continued success ==
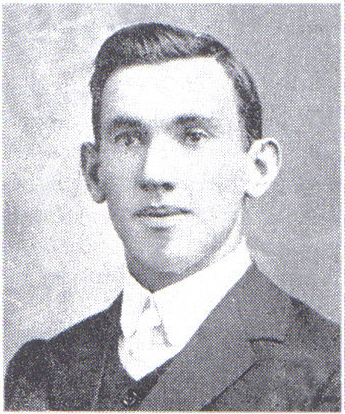
Alexander Juett, the first Rhodes Scholar from CBC Perth

In the years leading up to the Great War, staff and students of CBC Perth revelled in many indisputable signs of success. Four students won the Rhodes Scholarship between 1905 and 1914, the establishment of the Public Schools Sporting Association (PSSA) in 1905 added zest to interschool games in rowing, cricket, Australian Rules Football, swimming and athletics, boys began playing in red and black colours from 1905. Enduring features of private school life were inaugurated at CBC with the formation of a cadet company in 1909, prefects in 1913, and an Old Collegians Association in 1907.

In 1906 the Brothers produced a magazine-style prospectus to advertise CBC. Details of the college life, curriculum, examination results, staff, and fees were illustrated, with views of the college, successful students and student activities. The front cover carried an idyllic view of the college, entwining the symbols of Ireland and the Empire - shamrocks, English roses, Welsh daffodils, and one Scottish thistle. The flowers hinted quietly - that CBC has a vision of Catholic education aimed at achieving a place in the sun. The college building was expanded along Victoria Avenue, the three storey additions completed in August 1911 provided a new chapel, library and two additional dormitories. CBC was a Catholic institution and much of the weight of Catholicism rested in the chapel. The internal record of the Christian Brothers show a concern for the Catholic spirit of the college, even when it was enjoying widespread success as a social institution. The Congregational visitor, who carried out regular inspections of the Perth community as required by Canon Law, made complaints in 1914 that while the students were "good", they were not "identifiably Catholic".

== Rural boarding college ==
As early as 1908 Brother Jerome Hennesy had written from Perth to the Superior General, indicating that he saw merit in moving the boarders out of the city. Bishop Gibney had recently renewed a previous offer of "some time ago" for 500 acres of land on the Helena River so the Brothers could open a boarding college in the country. In 1909 the Brothers negotiated for the purchase of 20,000 acres at Point Heathcoate, a property known as Killarney. The Provincial Council, balancing finance against the needs of several schools, did not pursue the sale. However, in 1917 Archbishop Clune added his weight to a move to a more serene setting. The archbishop knew that the Brothers valued their monopoly on education for Catholic boys in Perth. Galvanized by the problems at the Terrace site and by the promise that there would be no competing schools for Catholic boys, the Provincial Council made plans. The Killarney property was purchased for £3,000, in 1923, the State government resume 1 acre of land, cutting the site and making it difficult to locate a school there. The Brothers sold the remaining land to the government for £7,000. At the same time that efforts were going ahead to secure a new site for the school at Clune Park, south of the city in semi-rural land, the community at the Terrace prized its central location on some counts.

Throughout the 1920s and early 1930s the Brothers worked towards finding a site outside Perth so that the boarders could be moved from the city. In November 1928 the Brothers purchased 234 acres of diocesan land for £896. The college annual published photographs of the land at Clune Park with the site for the new boarding college tentatively named "St Johns". In general, the opinion was that Clune Park was the idea site for a boarding school and the Brothers need look no further. However, with the delay in the project, a persuasive minority opinion in favour of the more remote but higher ground of Mount Henry began to emerge. In 1938 overcrowding and the weight of public opinion combined to insist that the boarding students move away from the city. In discussions that emphasised the centrality of boarders to the character of the college, the Provincial Council initially decided that the school in the Terrace should close, with boarders only being accepted at the new site. However, the significance of CBC Perth as an inner-city day school to meet the needs of metropolitan boys could not be denied.

Change had been on the cards at CBC Perth for some time. The arrival of Brother Keniry as headmaster in 1934 also signalled changes, and upgraded the profile of the school. A specially designed crest for the CBC uniform replaced the all-purpose crest of the Christian Brothers order, and the school adopted a new motto Veritas Vincit.

When the school year opened in 1938, the headmaster, Brother Foley, his staff, boarding students and 65 day students from CBC Perth had transferred out of the city and had adopted the name Aquinas College. Classes for day students continued at CBC Perth under new headmaster Brother PL Duffy. In the concern for the red and black colours and the traditions of the college, there was a determination that this new college was not to become another Brothers' school. Brother Keniry's emblematic changes, and those of his successor, Brother Foley, transferred with the school to Mount Henry, along with the honor boards and membership of the PSA. In June 1938 the minutes of the PSSA simply noted "that the change of name of Christian Brothers College to Aquinas be recorded."

== See also ==
- List of boarding schools in Australia
- List of schools in the Perth metropolitan area
- Catholic education in Australia
