= Perth Cathedral =

Perth Cathedral may refer to:

- St Ninian's Cathedral (Anglican) in Perth, Scotland
- St George's Cathedral, Perth (Anglican) in Perth, Australia
- St Mary's Cathedral, Perth (Roman Catholic) in Perth, Australia
