= John Joseph Rafferty =

Irish-born Australian Catholic bishop (1912–1962)

The Most Reverend John Joseph Rafferty
- Auxiliary Bishop Emeritus of Archdiocese of Perth
- Archdiocese: Perth
- Installed: 26 October 1955
- Term ended: 6 January 1962
- Other post: Titular Bishop of Pharan (1955–1962)

Orders
- Ordination: 25 April 1936 at St Kieran's College Chapel, Kilkenny by Patrick Collier
- Consecration: 26 October 1955 at St Mary's Cathedral, Perth by Romolo Carboni

Personal details
- Born: John Joseph Rafferty; 10 August 1912 Killaloe, County Clare, Ireland
- Died: 6 January 1962 (aged 49) Killaloe, County Clare, Ireland
- Denomination: Catholic Church
- Occupation: Catholic bishop
- Education: St Kieran's College
- Motto: We Fly to Thy Patronage

John Joseph Rafferty (10 August 1912 – 6 January 1962) was an Irish-born Australian bishop of the Catholic Church. He served as Auxiliary Bishop of Perth for just over five years before dying suddenly at the age of 49.

== Early life ==
Rafferty was born in Killaloe, County Clare to Patrick and Ellen Rafferty. He was baptised in the Church of St Flannan and received his education at St Flannan's College in Ennis. He pursued priestly studied at St Kieran's College, Kilkenny. While studying there, he was accepted for ministry in the Archdiocese of Adelaide. Towards the end of his seminary studies, he was found to be no longer required. He approached then Archbishop Redmond Prendiville of Perth while the bishop was visiting St Kieran's and an agreement was reached whereby Adelaide loaned John Rafferty to Perth for a short period.

== Priesthood ==
Rafferty was ordained at St Kieran's College on 25 April 1936 by Bishop Patrick Collier. He arrived in Perth on 21 July 1936.

His first appointment was as assistant at St Mary's Cathedral, Perth. Three years later, he became secretary to Archbishop Redmond Garrett Prendiville, serving in this role until 1947 when he returned to Ireland for a year. He returned in 1948 and was named administrator of St Mary's Cathedral, Perth. He was then made Chancellor of the Archdiocese of Perth in 1949.

== Episcopate ==
On 12 June 1955, he was appointed Auxiliary Bishop of Perth and Titular Bishop of Pharan. He was consecrated on 26 October 1955 at St Mary's Cathedral, Perth by Archbishop Romolo Carboni, Apostolic Delegate to Australasia and Oceania.

== Death ==
While holidaying in Ireland for a period of six months in, Rafferty suddenly collapsed after visiting friends and died on 6 January 1962. He had been due to return to Perth in just a few days. He was 49. His funeral took place on 12 January 1962.

Rafferty had been a popular figure among his brother priests during his episcopate, with one writing after his funeral: "The number of clergy present showed that wherever the late Bishop travelled he made friends."

Catholic Church titles
Preceded by —	Auxiliary Bishop of Perth; 1955–1962	Succeeded by —
Preceded by Jean-Baptiste-Maximilien Chabalier	Titular Bishop of Pharan; 1955–1962	Succeeded by Giulio Barbetta
