= Matthew Gibney =

Roman Catholic cleric in Australia (1835–1925)

The Most Reverend Matthew Gibney
- 3rd Roman Catholic Bishop
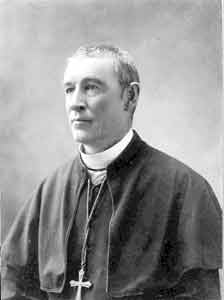
- Bishop Matthew Gibney
- Province: Sydney
- Diocese: Perth
- Installed: 1 November 1886
- Term ended: 14 May 1910
- Predecessor: Martin Griver
- Successor: Patrick Clune

Orders
- Ordination: 14 June 1925 (Priest)
- Consecration: 23 January 1887 (Bishop)

Personal details
- Born: 1 November 1835 Killeshandra, Cavan, Ireland
- Died: 22 June 1925 (aged 89) Perth, Western Australia
- Buried: St Mary's Cathedral, Perth
- Denomination: Roman Catholic Church
- Occupation: Roman Catholic bishop
- Profession: Cleric
- Education: Catholic Missionary College of All Hallows, Drumcondra, Dublin, Ireland

Matthew Gibney (1 November 1835 – 22 June 1925) was an Irish-born metropolitan bishop in Australia and the third Roman Catholic Bishop of Perth, serving from 1886 until 1910.

Gibney is perhaps best known for giving notorious bushranger Ned Kelly his last rites following a shootout at Glenrowan, Victoria, in 1880.

== Early years ==
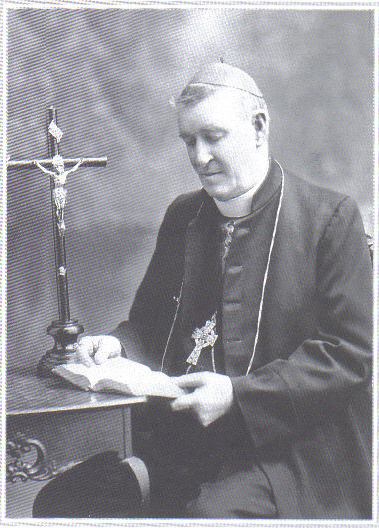
Gibney at Christian Brothers' College, Perth

Gibney was raised on the family farm in Killygorman townland, parish of Kildallan, County Cavan. Gibney studied for the priesthood at the preparatory seminary at Stillorgan and from 1857 at the Catholic Missionary College of All Hallows in Drumcondra, Dublin. He was ordained a priest in 1863 and arrived in Perth, Western Australia later that year.

On an 1880 trip through the Colony of Victoria, Gibney was travelling by train between Benalla and Albury when at Glenrowan, he disembarked to offer assistance during the Siege of Glenrowan. Ned Kelly and his gang had been cornered by the police in a local hotel, which the police set alight in order to draw out the remaining bushrangers. Gibney entered the burning building in an attempt to rescue anyone inside, and found the bodies of gang members Joe Byrne, Dan Kelly and Steve Hart, as well as the mortally wounded hostage Martin Cherry, who he helped retrieve and to whom he gave the last rites. Gibney also tended to the injured Ned Kelly following his capture, heard his confession and gave him the last rites.

== Bishop of Perth ==
In January 1887, Gibney was consecrated as Bishop of Perth. His episcopate was marked by a number of poor investment decisions as the diocese purchased shops, offices, houses, and a hotel in Perth as well as a newspaper, exerting editorial influence by banning the publication of horse racing information, which led to the paper's eventual demise. As the diocese's debts mounted, Gibney was forced to resign in May 1910. During his episcopate he was closely involved with the founding of the Beagle Bay Aboriginal community north of Broome, along with what eventually became St John of God Health Care.

Gibney died of cancer on 22 June 1925 and was buried in St Mary's Cathedral in Perth.

=== Exhumation ===
During restoration work in the cathedral from 2003 to 2006, the brick and plaster crypt containing the coffins of Gibney and Bishop Martin Griver were discovered by archaeologists under the floorboards of the cathedral.

== Popular culture ==
He was played by John Fernside in The Glenrowan Affair (1951).

Catholic Church titles
Preceded by Martin Griver	3rd Catholic Bishop of Perth; 1886–1910	Succeeded by Patrick Clune
