= List of Catholic dioceses in Australia =

Currently there are 33 Catholic dioceses in Australia, consist of 5 metropolitan archdioceses, 21 suffragan dioceses, 2 non-metropolitan archdioceses, and 5 Eastern Rite dioceses. In addition there is a military ordinariate and a personal ordinariate.

A geographical map of the 28 Roman Catholic dioceses in Australia, coloured by ecclesiastical province. Archdioceses are coloured darker than their suffragans.

== List of dioceses ==
=== Australian Catholic Bishops Conference ===
==== Ecclesiastical Province of Adelaide ====
- Archdiocese of Adelaide
  - Diocese of Darwin
  - Diocese of Port Pirie

==== Ecclesiastical Province of Brisbane ====
- Archdiocese of Brisbane
  - Diocese of Cairns
  - Diocese of Rockhampton
  - Diocese of Toowoomba
  - Diocese of Townsville

==== Ecclesiastical Province of Melbourne ====
- Archdiocese of Melbourne
  - Diocese of Ballarat
  - Diocese of Sale
  - Diocese of Sandhurst

==== Ecclesiastical Province of Perth ====
- Archdiocese of Perth
  - Diocese of Broome
  - Diocese of Bunbury
  - Diocese of Geraldton

==== Ecclesiastical Province of Sydney ====
- Archdiocese of Sydney
  - Diocese of Armidale
  - Diocese of Bathurst
  - Diocese of Broken Bay
  - Diocese of Lismore
  - Diocese of Maitland-Newcastle
  - Diocese of Parramatta
  - Diocese of Wagga Wagga
  - Diocese of Wilcannia-Forbes
  - Diocese of Wollongong

==== Immediately subject to the Holy See ====
- Archdiocese of Canberra and Goulburn
- Archdiocese of Hobart

==== Eastern Rite Dioceses ====
- Chaldean: Eparchy of St Thomas
- Maronite: Eparchy of St Maron
- Melkite: Eparchy of St Michael Archangel
- Syro-Malabar: Eparchy of St Thomas the Apostle
- Ukrainian: Eparchy of Saints Peter and Paul

==== Ordinariates ====
- Military Ordinariate of Australia
- Personal Ordinariate of Our Lady of the Southern Cross
