= Timothy Costelloe =

Australian prelate of the Catholic Church (born 1954)

The Most Reverend Timothy Costelloe SDB
- Archbishop of Perth
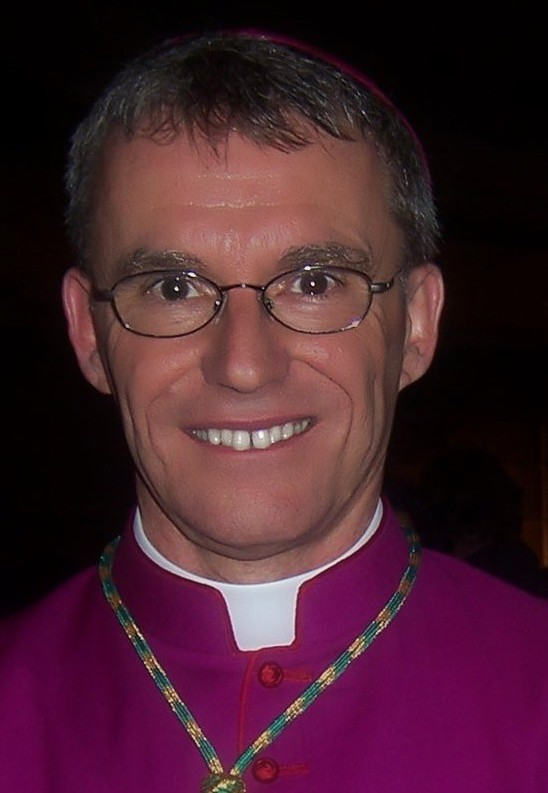
- Costelloe in May 2007
- Church: Catholic Church
- Archdiocese: Perth
- Appointed: 20 February 2012
- Installed: 21 March 2012
- Predecessor: Barry Hickey
- Other post: President of the Australian Catholic Bishops' Conference (2022–)
- Previous posts: Auxiliary Bishop of Melbourne (2007–2012); Titular Bishop of Cluain Iraird (2007–2012)

Orders
- Ordination: 25 October 1986 by Frank Little
- Consecration: 15 June 2007 by Denis Hart; George Pell (co-consecrator); Ambrose De Paoli (co-consecrator)

Personal details
- Born: Timothy John Costelloe; 3 February 1954 (age 72) Melbourne, Victoria, Australia
- Education: Salesian Pontifical University; Melbourne College of Divinity
- Motto: Latin: Via veritas vita, lit. 'The way, the truth, and the life'
- Coat of arms: Timothy Costelloe's coat of arms

Styles of Timothy Costelloe
- Reference style: The Most Reverend
- Spoken style: Your Grace
- Religious style: Archbishop
- Posthumous style: not applicable

Ordination history of Timothy Costelloe
History
Priestly ordination
- Ordained by: Frank Little (Melbourne)
Episcopal consecration
- Principal consecrator: Denis Hart (Melbourne)
- Co-consecrators: George Pell (Sydney); Ambrose De Paoli (Apostolic Nuncio to Australia)
Episcopal succession
Bishops consecrated by Timothy Costelloe as principal consecrator
- Michael Henry Morrissey: 28 June 2017

Timothy John Costelloe, SDB (born 3 February 1954) is an Australian Catholic prelate who has served as Archbishop of Perth since 2012. He is a member of the Salesians of Don Bosco.

== Life and ministry ==
Costelloe was born in Melbourne on 3 February 1954. Educated there at St Peter's East Bentleigh and Salesian College, Chadstone, he commenced teacher training at Christ College, Melbourne, before joining the Salesians of Don Bosco in 1977. He graduated from Christ College in 1978. Professed as a Salesian in 1985, Costelloe was ordained as a priest on 25 October 1986 by Archbishop Sir Frank Little in Melbourne.

After three years at Salesian College, Chadstone, he was transferred to Rome where he completed a Licentiate in Sacred Theology at the Salesian Pontifical University in 1991. On his return to Melbourne, Costelloe began lecturing in theology at Catholic Theological College in Melbourne. Transferred to Perth in 1996, Costelloe served as parish priest St Joachim's Victoria Park and lectured at the University of Notre Dame Australia, Fremantle. He completed his doctorate in theology from the Melbourne College of Divinity. He returned to Melbourne in 1999, was appointed as rector to the Salesian community, and resumed teaching commitments at the Catholic Theological College. He was appointed as parish priest of St John the Baptist's Clifton Hill in 2006 and as parish priest of the adjoining St Joseph'sCollingwood in 2007. During this period he also held a number of senior positions in the Salesian order.

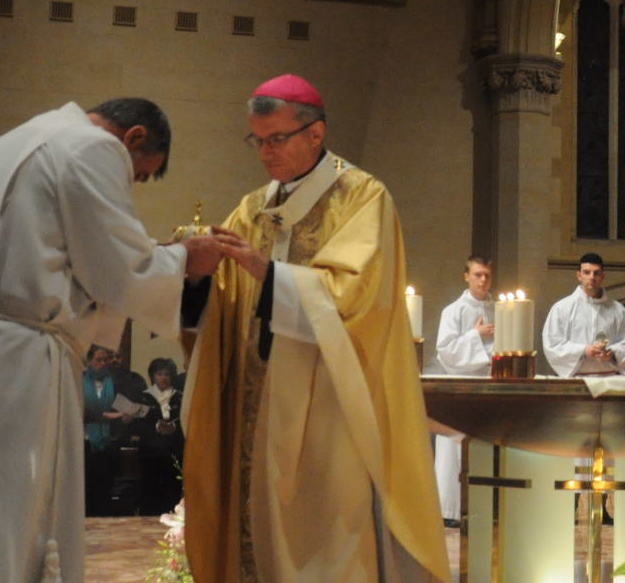
Costelloe in 2013

=== Episcopate ===
In April 2007, Costelloe was appointed an auxiliary bishop of Melbourne and titular bishop of Cluain Iraird. He was consecrated on 15 June 2007 by Denis Hart, Archbishop of Melbourne, with Cardinal George Pell, Archbishop of Sydney, and Ambrose De Paoli, apostolic nuncio to Australia) as co-consecrators.

With a strong interest in Catholic education, Costelloe held a number of senior roles in the Melbourne archdiocese, including being the episcopal vicar for tertiary education and the chair of the Catholic Education Commission of Victoria. An adjunct professor at the Australian Catholic University, he is also a member of the Australian Catholic Bishops Conference Commission for Catholic Education.

In February 2012 Pope Benedict XVI named Costelloe to succeed Barry Hickey as Archbishop of Perth. On 21 March 2012 he was installed as archbishop at St Mary's Cathedral, Perth.

As archbishop, he inaugurated the Vincentian Retreat Centre Perth in Karrakup on 29 July 2017.

On 23 October 2024, the Synod of Bishops elected Costelloe a member of the Ordinary Council of the General Secretariat of the Synod.

Costelloe is the Grand Prior of the Western Australia Lieutenancy of the Equestrian Order of the Holy Sepulchre of Jerusalem.

Catholic Church titles
Preceded by Barry Hickey	9th Catholic Archbishop of Perth; 2012–present	Incumbent
