= John Brady (bishop of Perth) =

Australian bishop

The Right Reverend John Brady
- 1st Roman Catholic Bishop of Perth
- Province: Sydney
- Diocese: Perth
- Installed: 9 May 1845
- Term ended: 3 December 1871
- Successor: Martin Griver

Orders
- Ordination: 1825 (Priest) in France
- Consecration: 25 May 1845 (Bishop) in Collegiate Church of Propaganda, Rome

Personal details
- Born: circa 1800 Cavan, Ireland
- Died: 3 December 1871 (aged 71) Amélie-les-Bains, France
- Buried: Cathedral of the Immaculate Conception of the Blessed Virgin Mary, Perth
- Denomination: Roman Catholic Church
- Occupation: Roman Catholic bishop
- Profession: Cleric

John Brady (c. 1800 – 3 December 1871) was an Australian Catholic prelate who served as the first Bishop of Perth from 1845 until his death in 1871. He was suspended of his functions motu proprio in October 1851 by Pope Pius IX.

== Early years ==
Educated in a French seminary, Brady served on Réunion Island for twelve years. On his return to Rome in 1836, he met Dr William Ullathorne who was recruiting priests for the Australian mission and was eager to secure his services. Brady arrived in 1838 in Sydney with the first large group of secular Irish clergy to reach Australia. Bishop John Bede Polding appointed Brady to Windsor where his extensive parish (based at St Matthew's Roman Catholic Church, Windsor from 1838 to 1843) included Penrith and all branches of the Hawkesbury from Windsor to Broken Bay. His charges were mainly Irish convicts assigned to the landholders, and he rode hundreds of miles a month to serve them. After repeated incidents of coercion, he was instrumental in establishing the convicts' right to freedom of worship. He was in touch with the Aboriginals and ministered to the French Canadian prisoners at Longbottom.

== Bishop of Perth ==
After five years, Brady was appointed vicar-general of Western Australia. Accompanied by a Dutch priest and an Irish catechist, he arrived in Perth on 13 December 1843 and was gratefully welcomed by the small group of Catholics who had been without a priest. Brady dealt reasonably competently with the colonial authorities and Governor John Hutt granted land for a church and school.

Brady became convinced that he was working in a field ripe for the harvest and hastened to Rome to petition for priests and missionaries. He was particularly interested in evangelizing the Aboriginals and recommended that missions be established at King George Sound and Port Victoria. When it was decided to make Western Australia a separate diocese, Ullathorne declined the see and Brady was appointed bishop and consecrated in the Collegiate Church of Propaganda in May 1845. He returned to Perth next January with twenty-seven missionaries: French priests and brothers, Irish nuns and catechists and Spanish Benedictines.

The small Catholic community could not absorb this group of differing nationalities and ecclesiastical training. Only one of the seven priests spoke English fluently. The French priests could do little with the Aboriginals near Albany, were suspected by the English settlers and finally transferred to Mauritius. Dom Joseph Benedict Serra and Dom Rosendo Salvado after initial difficulties established the flourishing Aboriginal mission at New Norcia.

Brady was living in conditions of extreme privation as death or disaster scattered many of his helpers. Harassed by pastoral responsibilities he petitioned the Propaganda for aid. Dom Serra, then in Europe raising funds for the debt-encumbered mission, was appointed coadjutor bishop of Perth and administrator of the temporalities of the see. This appointment did nothing to alleviate the mushrooming difficulties. Brady went to Rome in 1850 to lay his case before the congregation of Propaganda. He was admonished for administering church property unwisely; with Brady suspended of his functions in October 1851 by Pope Pius IX by a motu proprio, he returned to Perth without permission and engaged in violent disputes with his coadjutor. The debacle was only terminated by legal action and the disciplinary visit of Archbishop John B. Polding in 1852.

Brady withdrew to his native Diocese of Kilmore in Ireland and died without having resigned his see on 2 December 1871 at Amélie-les-Bains.

In March 2011, the body of Brady was exhumed from the Cemetery of Amelie-les-Bains by Fr Robert Cross (archaeologist), Jade O' Brien (archaeologist), Odhran O'Brien (historian), Dr Michael Shanahan (medical expert) and Fr Jean-Noel Maree (translator). In August 2011, Archbishop Barry James Hickey solemnly reinterred the human remains of Brady in the crypt of the Cathedral of the Immaculate Conception of the Blessed Virgin Mary, Perth.

== Published works ==
Brady wrote a book detailing the language of the local aborigines: A Descriptive Vocabulary of the Native Language of W. Australia (1845 in English; an Italian version was published soon afterwards). A posthumous version titled A descriptive vocabulary of the West Australian Aboriginal language was published in 1899.

The book appears to be an adaptation of A Descriptive Vocabulary of the Language in Common Use Amongst the Aborigines of Western Australia (1842) by George Fletcher Moore which Brady had presented in Rome.

== Exhumation ==
In 2011, Brady's remains were exhumed from his grave in France and he was laid to rest in the crypt of St Mary's Cathedral, Perth.

Catholic Church titles
Preceded by Newly erected Diocese	1st Bishop of Perth; 1845–1871	Succeeded by Martin Griver
