= Timici =

Historic settlement in modern day Algeria

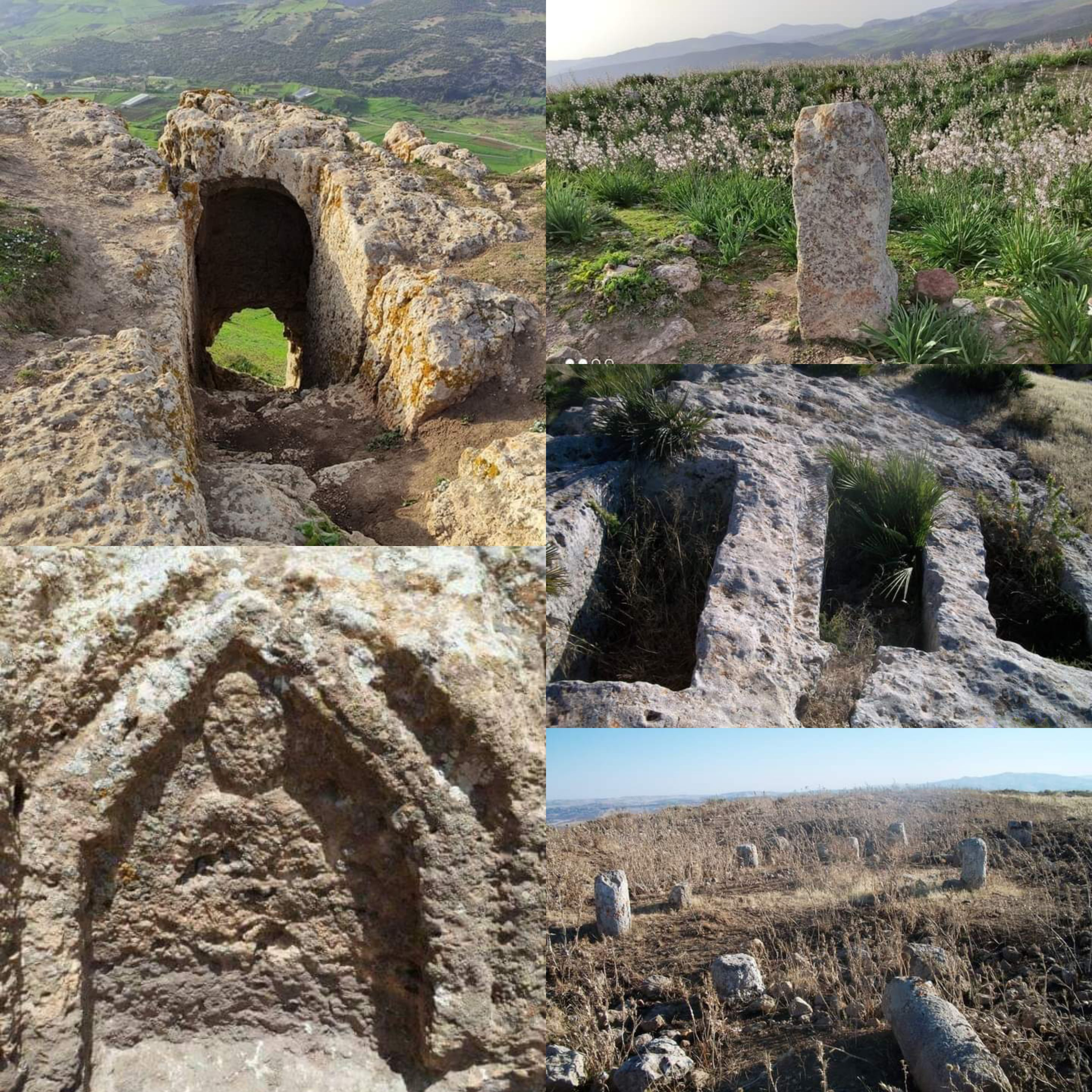
- Timici ruins
- Location: Aïn Metboul, Sidi M'hamed Ben Ali

History
- Built: 4th century BC
- Demolished: 6th century

Site notes
- Height: 500
- Architectural styles: Punic and Roman
- Restored: 1st century

Timici was a Phoenician, Numidian, and Roman town located in present-day Ain Matboul, Algeria (between Sidi M'hamed Ben Ali and Taougrit).

== Name ==
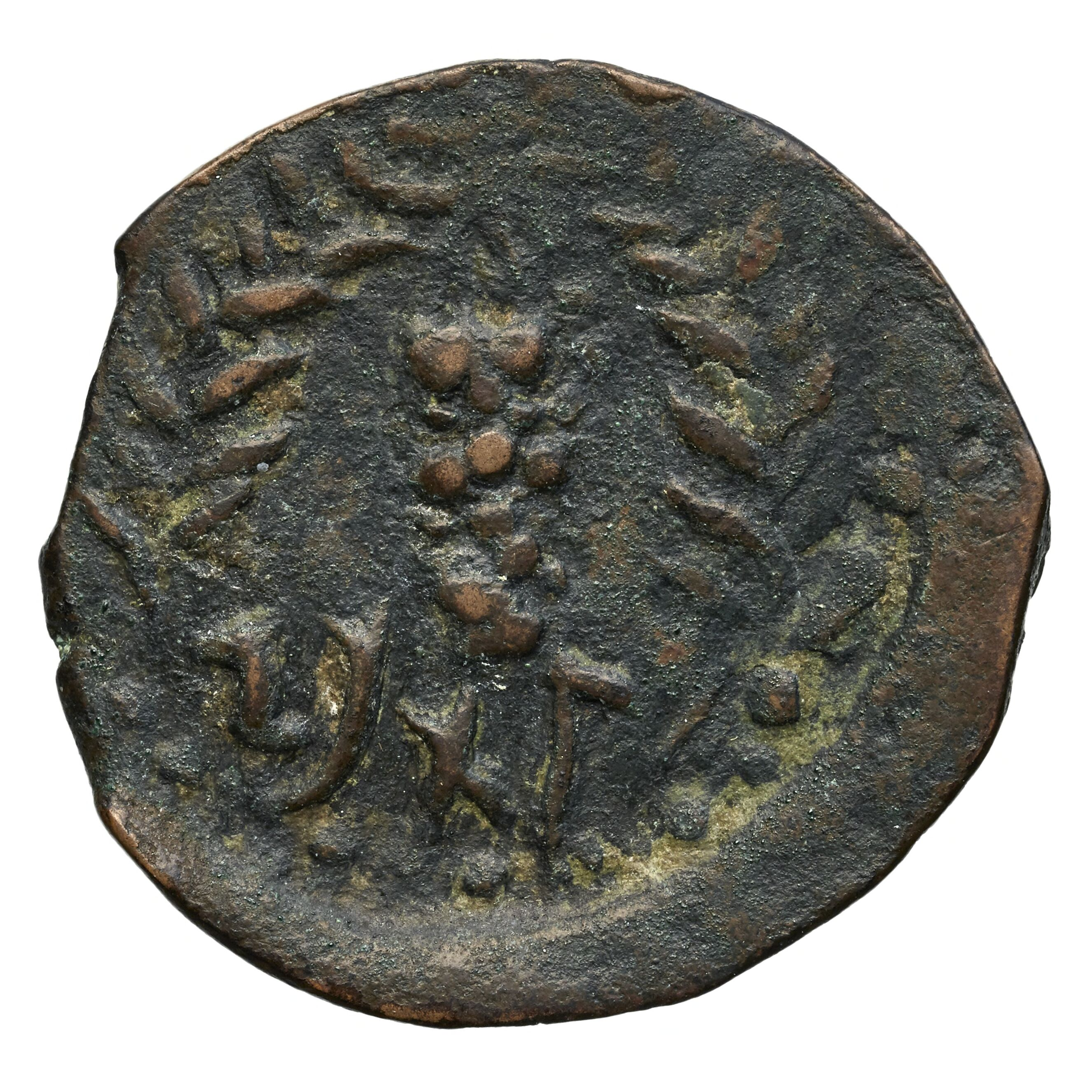
A coin of Timici with the Punic legend 𐤕𐤌𐤊𐤉 (tmky)

Timici is a Latinization of the town's Punic name 𐤕𐤌𐤊𐤉 (tmky).

Timici means fire in Tamazight.

== History ==
Timici minted its own bronze coins with Punic legends.

Under the Romans, Timici was a native town (civitas) in the province of Mauretania Caesariensis.

The town was previously identified with the ruins at Aïn Témouchent, which were actually the remnants of Roman Albulae.

== Religion ==
Timici was the seat of a Christian bishop in antiquity. Three of them appear in the surviving historical record. The title fell into abeyance during the Islamic conquest of the Maghreb but was revived as a Roman Catholic titular see (Latin: Dioecesis Timicitana) in the 20th century.

=== List of bishops ===
- Vitorre a Catholic bishop who represented the town at the Council of Carthage (411), which heard the dispute between Catholic and Donatists.
- The Donatist Optato was Vittores' counterpart at the conference.
- Honorius participated in the synod assembled in Carthage in 484 by King Huneric of the Vandal Kingdom, after the synod Honorius was exiled.
- Fernando Ariztía Ruiz (1967–1976)
- Ramón Darío Molina Jaramillo (1977–1984)
- Toribio Ticona Porco (1986–1992)
- Francisco Cases Andreu (1994–1996)
- John Forrosuelo Du (1997–2001)
- Donald George Sproxton (2001–current), Perth's auxiliary bishop.
