= Archdiocese of Perth =

Catholic ecclesiastical territory in Australia

Coordinates: 31°57′19.58″S 115°51′55.29″E

Metropolitan Archdiocese of Perth Archidioecesis Metropolitae Perthensis

Catholic
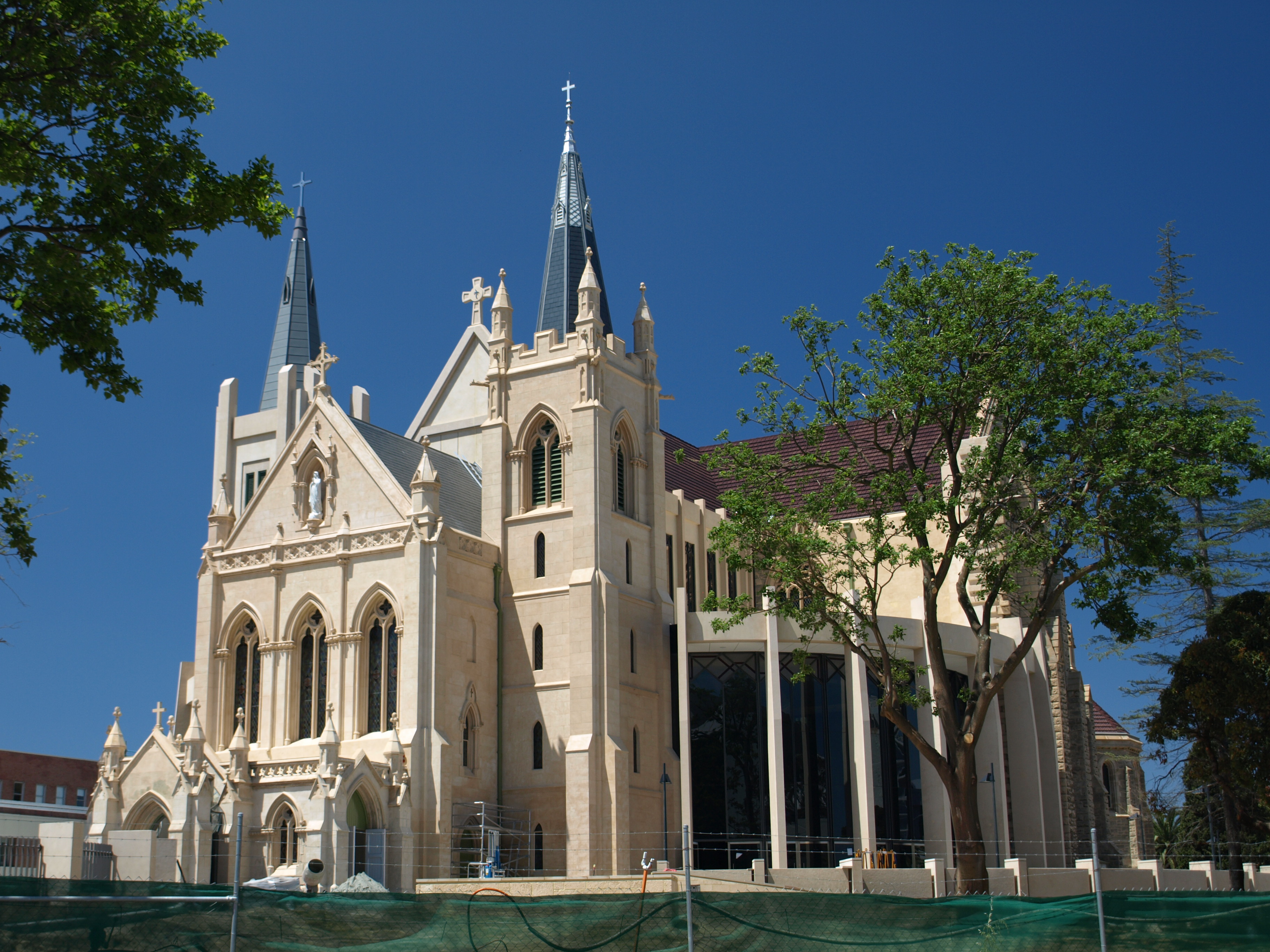
- Cathedral of the Immaculate Conception of the Blessed Virgin Mary, Perth

- Coat of Arms of the Archdiocese of Perth

Location
- Country: Australia
- Territory: Greater Perth, Goldfields-Esperance, Peel, Wheatbelt regions of Western Australia, Christmas Island, Cocos (Keeling) Islands
- Ecclesiastical province: Perth

Statistics
- Area: 471,118 km^{2} (181,900 sq mi)
- Population: Total; Catholics: (as of 2023); ▲2,114,911; ▲527,450 (▲23%)
- Parishes: ▲109

Information
- Denomination: Catholic Church
- Sui iuris church: Latin Church
- Rite: Roman Rite
- Established: 6 May 1845; 181 years ago (diocese); 28 August 1913; 113 years ago (archdiocese)
- Cathedral: Cathedral of the Immaculate Conception of the Blessed Virgin Mary (St Mary's), Perth
- Secular priests: 163 (2023), plus 72 religious priests

Current leadership
- Pope: Leo XIV
- Metropolitan Archbishop: Timothy Costelloe
- Auxiliary Bishops: Donald Sproxton; Nelson Po
- Bishops emeritus: Barry Hickey

Map

Website
- www.perthcatholic.org.au

The Metropolitan Archdiocese of Perth is a Latin Church metropolitan archdiocese of the Catholic Church in Australia covering the Greater Perth, Goldfields-Esperance, Peel and Wheatbelt regions of Western Australia.

St Mary's Cathedral located in Perth, Western Australia, is the seat of the Catholic Metropolitan Archbishop of Perth, currently Timothy Costelloe, appointed in February 2012.

== History ==
On 6 May 1845 the Diocese of Perth was erected in an area covered and administered previously by the Archdiocese of Sydney.

It lost territory repeatedly, to establish on 12 March 1867 the Benedictine Territorial Abbacy of New Norcia, on 10 May 1887 the Apostolic Vicariate of Kimberley in Western Australia and on 30 January 1898 the Diocese of Geraldton.

It was elevated as Metropolitan archdiocese on 29 August 1913.

On 12 November 1954 it lost territory to establish the Roman Catholic Diocese of Bunbury.

In 1982 it regained former territory from the suppressed Territorial Abbacy of New Norcia.

== Cathedral ==
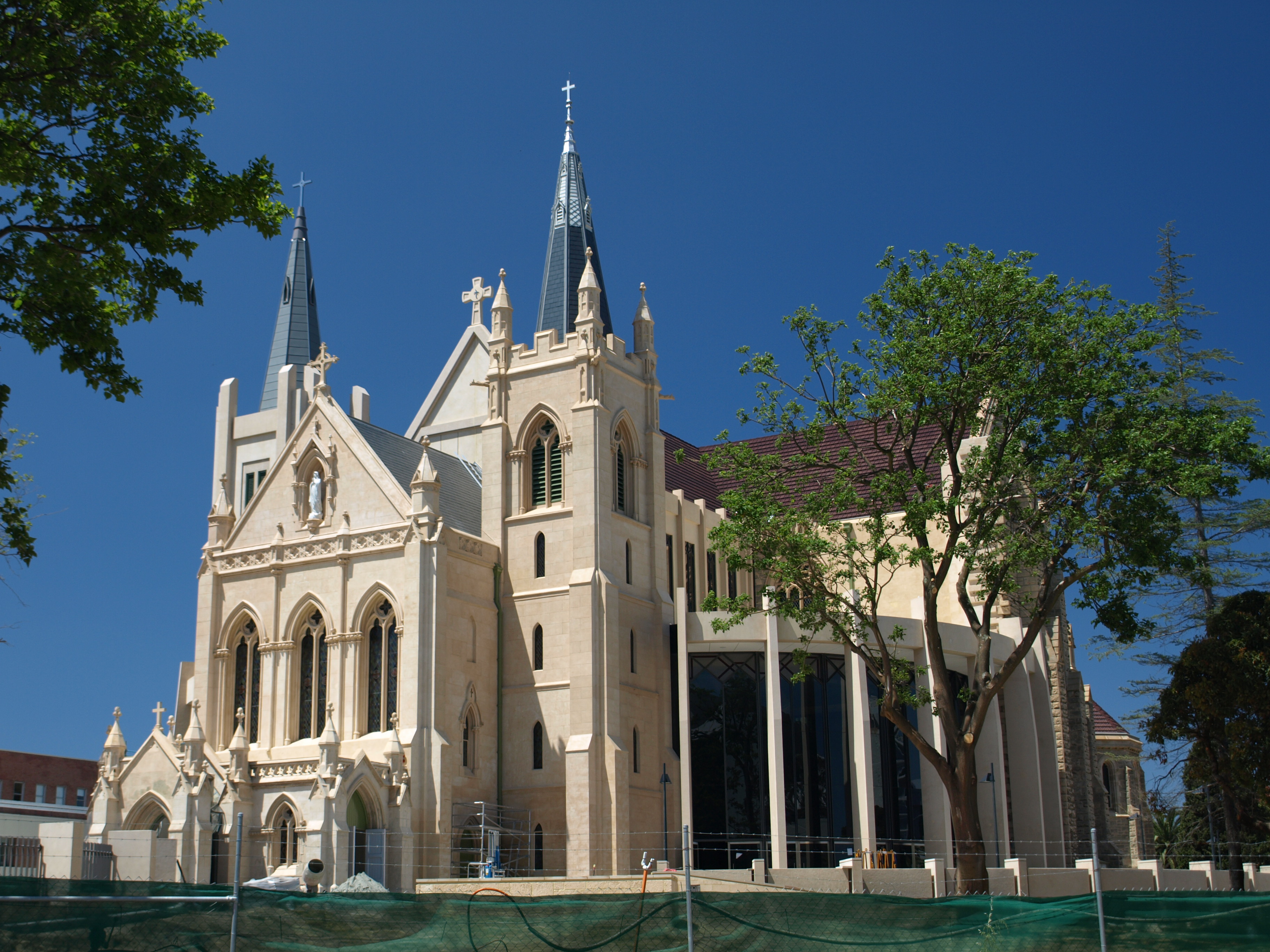
Cathedral of the Immaculate Conception of the Blessed Virgin Mary (St Mary's), Perth

The Cathedral of the Immaculate Conception of the Blessed Virgin Mary, commonly called St Mary's Cathedral, is the seat of the archbishop and is located in East Perth.

During restoration work in the cathedral between 2003 and 2006, the brick and plaster crypt containing the coffins of bishops Matthew Gibney and Martin Griver was discovered by archaeologists under the floorboards of an aisle in the cathedral.

In 2011, the remains of Perth's first bishop, John Brady, were exhumed from his grave in France and he was laid to rest in the crypt.

== Province ==
The Ecclesiastical Province of Perth includes for the suffragan dioceses of Broome and Perth's two daughter-bishoprics, Bunbury and Geraldton.

== Bishops ==
=== Episcopal incumbents ===
The following individuals have been elected as archbishop of Perth, or any of its precursor titles:

Diocesan suffragan bishops

Order	Name	Title	Date installed	Ministry ended	Term of office	Reason for term end
1	John Brady †	Bishop of Perth	9 May 1845	3 December 1871^{^}	26 years, 6 months	Died in office
2	Martin Griver †	Apostolic Administrator of Perth	1 October 1869	22 July 1873	3 years, 9 months	Succeeded as Bishop of Perth
2	Martin Griver †	Bishop of Perth	22 July 1873	1 November 1886	13 years, 102 days	Died in office
3	Matthew Gibney †	Coadjutor Bishop of Perth	28 September 1886	1 November 1886	34 days	Succeeded as Bishop of Perth
3	Matthew Gibney †	Bishop of Perth	1 November 1886	14 May 1910	23 years, 194 days	Resigned and appointed Bishop Emeritus of Perth
4	Patrick Clune, CSsR †	Bishop of Perth	21 December 1910	28 August 1913	2 years, 8 months	Elevated as Archbishop of Perth

- ^{^} = Bishop John Brady was suspended from his functions motu proprio in October 1851 by Pope Pius IX and José Benito Serra appointed as coadjutor bishop of Perth, reporting to the Archbishop of Sydney. Brady retained the title Bishop of Perth, although living in exile from his Diocese, until his death. Serra served as Coadjutor Bishop and Temporal Administrator of Perth from 1849 to 1851, Apostolic Administrator from 1851 to 1862. Rosendo Salvado was appointed Coadjutor Bishop of Perth for three years from 1853 (Note: Some sources say 'from 1849'.) while Serra was absent in Europe.

Metropolitan Archbishops

Order	Name	Title	Date installed	Ministry ended	Term of office	Reason for term end
4	Patrick Clune, CSsR †	Archbishop of Perth	28 August 1913	24 May 1935	21 years, 8 months	Died in office
5	Redmond Prendiville †	Coadjutor Archbishop of Perth	11 July 1933	24 May 1935	1 year, 10 months	Elevated as Archbishop of Perth
5	Redmond Prendiville †	Archbishop of Perth	24 May 1935	28 June 1968	33 years, 1 month	Died in office
6	Launcelot Goody †	Archbishop of Perth	18 October 1968	26 October 1983	15 years	Retired and appointed Archbishop Emeritus of Perth
7	William Foley †	Archbishop of Perth	26 October 1983	10 February 1991	7 years, 11 months	Died in office
8	Barry Hickey	Archbishop of Perth	23 July 1991	20 February 2012	20 years, 6 months	Retired and appointed Archbishop Emeritus of Perth
9	Timothy Costelloe, SDB	Archbishop of Perth	20 February 2012	present	14 years, 7 months	incumbent

=== Coadjutor and auxiliary bishops ===
Current

- Donald George Sproxton – Appointed auxiliary bishop 12 December 2001, Titular Bishop of Timici
- Nelson Po – Appointed auxiliary bishop 2 February 2026, Titular Bishop of Agunto

Former

- Coadjutor Bishop Joseph Serra y Juliá, O.S.B. † (7 August 1849 – 7 January 1862)
- Coadjutor Bishop Matthew Gibney † (28 September 1886 – 1 November 1886), Titular Bishop of Hippus (1886.09.28 – 1 November 1886)
- Coadjutor Archbishop Redmond Prendiville † (11 July 1933 – 24 May 1935 see above), Titular Archbishop of Cypsela (11 July 1933 – 24 May 1935)
- Auxiliary Bishop Launcelot John Goody (later Archbishop) † (2 August 1951 – 12 November 1954 see above), Titular Bishop of Abydus (2 August 1951 – 12 November 1954), later Bishop of Bunbury (Australia) (12 November 1954 – 18 October 1968)
- Auxiliary Bishop John Joseph Rafferty † (12 June 1955 – 6 January 1962)
- Auxiliary Bishop Myles McKeon † (23 May 1962 – 6 March 1969)
- Auxiliary Bishop Peter Quinn † (26 June 1969 – 26 May 1982)
- Auxiliary Bishop Robert Healy † (2 October 1975 – 25 October 2000)

=== Other priests of the diocese who became bishops ===
- John O’Reilly †, appointed Bishop of Port Augusta in 1887
- William Bernard Kelly †, appointed Vicar Apostolic of Kimberley in Western Australia in 1894; appointed Bishop of Geraldton in 1898: consecrated bishop in 1898
- Justin Joseph Bianchini, appointed Bishop of Geraldton in 1992
- Gerard Joseph Holohan, appointed Bishop of Bunbury in 2001
- Max Leroy Davis, appointed Bishop of Australia, Military in 2003
- † = deceased

== Parishes ==
The archdiocese is divided into three separate deaneries that administer individual parishes covering inner metropolitan Perth, outer metropolitan Perth, and country parishes and church centres (with churches dedicated the saints as indicated).

=== Inner metropolitan Perth ===
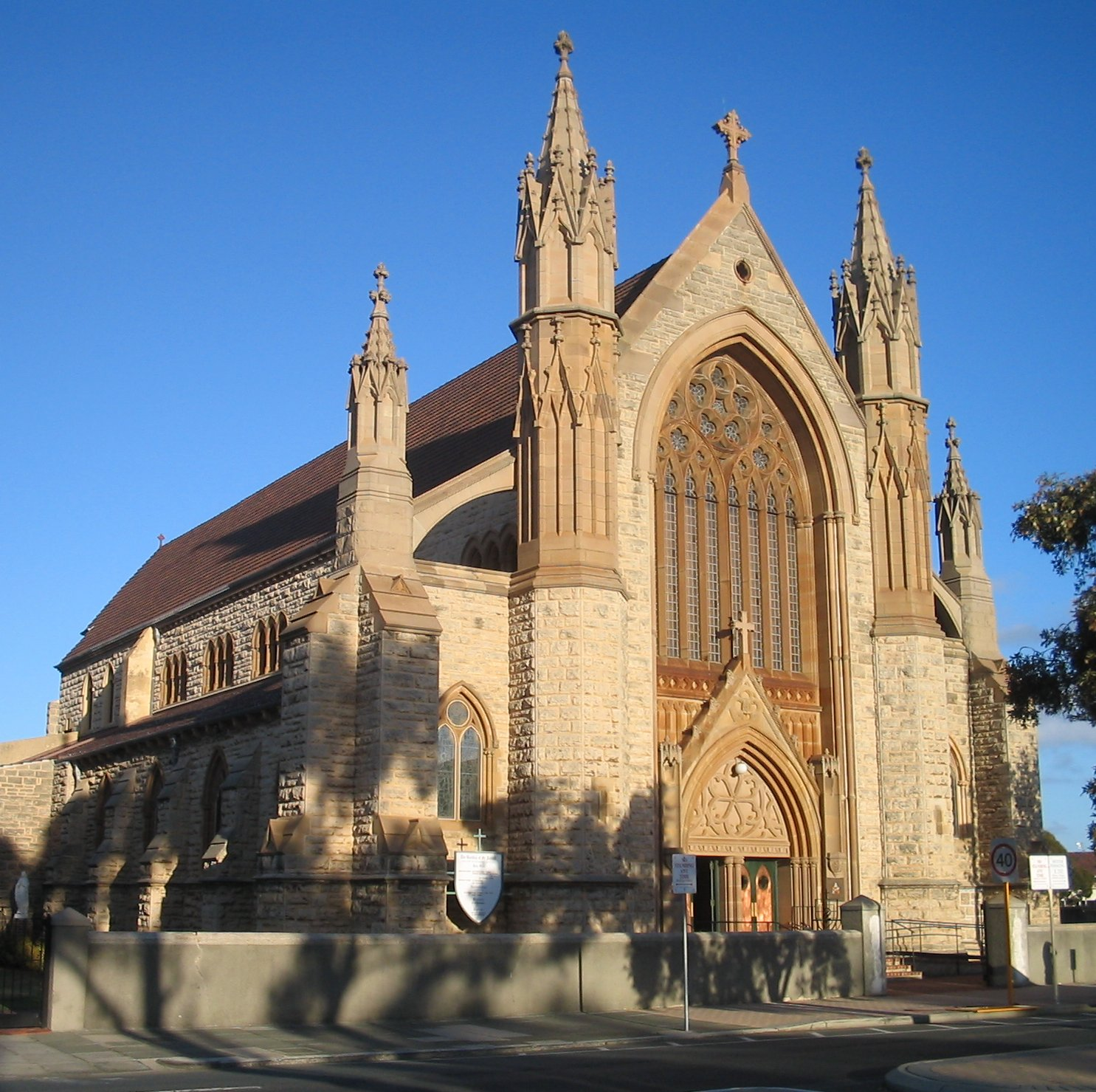
St Patrick's Basilica, Fremantle

The inner metropolitan deanery covers the cathedral parish of Perth (St Mary); and parishes located in Applecross (St Benedict's), Attadale (St Joseph Pignatelli), Balcatta (St Lawrence and Mary Immaculate), Ballajura (St Mary Mackillop), Bassendean (St Joseph), Bateman (St Thomas More), Bayswater (St Columba), Beaconsfield (Christ the King), Bentley (Santa Clara), Canning Vale (St Emilie de Vialar), Carlisle (Holy Name), City Beach (Holy Spirit), Claremont (St Thomas the Apostle), Cloverdale, (Notre Dame), Como (Holy Family), Cottesloe/Mosman Park (St Mary Star of the Sea), Dianella (Our Lady's Assumption), Doubleview (Our Lady of the Rosary), East Fremantle (Immaculate Conception), East Victoria Park (Our Lady Help of Christians), Embleton (Holy Trinity), Floreat (St Cecilia), Fremantle (St Patrick's Basilica), Girrawheen (Our Lady of Mercy), Glendalough (St Bernadette), Hamilton Hill (Holy Cross), Highgate (Sacred Heart), Hilton (Our Lady of Mount Carmel), Joondanna (St Denis), Innaloo/Karrinyup (St Dominic), Leederville (St Mary), Lynwood (St Jude), Lockridge (Good Shepherd), Manning (St Pius X), Maylands (Queen of Martyrs), Morley (Infant Jesus), Mirrabooka (St Gerald Majella), Mt Lawley (St Paul), Myaree (Pater Noster), Nedlands (Holy Rosary), Nollamara (Our Lady of Lourdes), North Beach (Our Lady of Grace), Northbridge (St Brigid), Osborne Park (St Kieran), Palmyra (Our Lady of Fatima), Queens Park (St Joseph), Riverton (Our Lady Queen of Apostles), Rivervale (St Augustine), Scarborough (Immaculate Heart of Mary), Shenton Park (St Aloysius), South Perth (St Columba), Subiaco (St Joseph), Victoria Park (St Joachim), Willetton (Saints John and Paul), and Wilson (Our Lady of Perpetual Help).

=== Outer metropolitan Perth ===
The outer metropolitan deanery covers parishes located in Armadale (St Francis Xavier), Baldivis (St Teresa of Calcutta), Clarkson (St Andrew), Ellenbrook (St Helena of the Holy Cross), Gosnells (Our Lady of the Most Blessed Sacrament), Greenmount (St Anthony), Greenwood (All Saints), Guildford (St Mary), Kalamunda (Holy Family), Kelmscott (Good Shepherd), Kwinana (St Vincent), Lesmurdie (Our Lady of Lourdes), Maddington (Holy Family), Maida Vale (St Francis of Assisi), Midland (St Brigid), Mundaring (Sacred Heart), Ocean Reef (St Simon Peter), Pickering Brook (Our Lady of Grace), Port Kennedy (St Bernadette), Rockingham (Our Lady of Lourdes), Spearwood (St Jerome), Thornlie (Sacred Heart), Wanneroo (St Anthony of Padua), Whitford (Our Lady of the Mission), Woodvale (St Luke), Yanchep (Guilderton Community Hall), and Yangebup (Mater Christi).

== See also ==
- Catholic Church in Australia
- List of Catholic archdioceses in Oceania
- List of Catholic dioceses in Australia
