= Barry Hickey =

Australian archbishop (born 1936)

The Most Reverend Barry Hickey OAM KC*HS STL
- 8th Archbishop of Perth
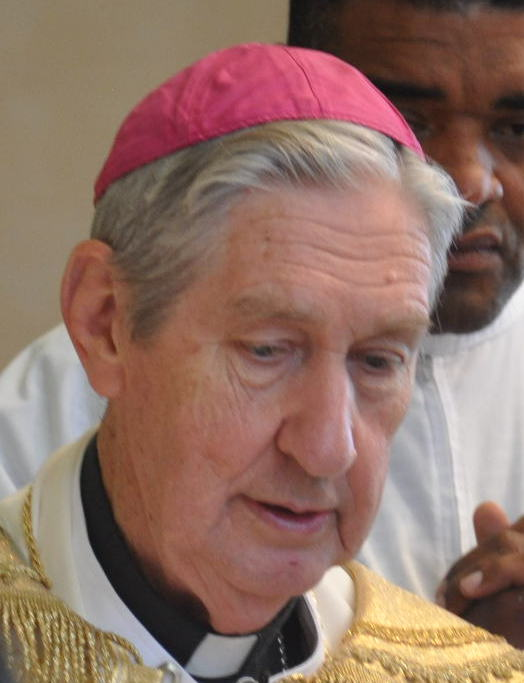
- Province: Perth
- Diocese: Archdiocese of Perth
- Installed: 27 August 1991
- Term ended: 20 February 2012
- Predecessor: William Foley
- Successor: Timothy Costelloe
- Other posts: Bishop of Geraldton (1984–1991)

Orders
- Ordination: 20 December 1958, (priest) in Rome
- Consecration: 1 May 1984, (bishop) in Geraldton

Personal details
- Born: Barry James Hickey; 16 April 1936 (age 90) Leonora, Western Australia
- Denomination: Roman Catholic Church
- Occupation: Roman Catholic bishop
- Profession: Cleric
- Education: University of Western Australia; Pontifical Urbaniana University, Rome
- Motto: Umbram Fugat Veritas ("Truth puts the shadows to flight")

Styles of Barry Hickey
- Reference style: The Most Reverend
- Spoken style: Your Grace
- Religious style: Emeritus Archbishop
- Posthumous style: not applicable

Barry James Hickey OAM KC*HS (born 16 April 1936) an Australian metropolitan bishop, was the eighth Roman Catholic archbishop of the Archdiocese of Perth, Western Australia, serving from 1991 until his retirement in 2012.

== Early career ==
Hickey was ordained as a priest in Rome by Cardinal Paolo Giobbe on 20 December 1958 He attained a Licentiate in Theology from the Pontifical Urbaniana University in 1959 and undergraduate and master's degrees in social work from the University of Western Australia in 1973. He was parish priest of Sacred Heart Parish, Highgate, at the time of his consecration as Bishop of Geraldton in 1984.

== Archbishop of Perth ==
Hickey was installed as Archbishop of Perth on 27 August 1991.

In 1994 he addressed the National Press Club, talking about the release of the new Catholic Catechism.

During his tenure as archbishop, Hickey is credited with the significant physical change achieved through the re-building and completion of St Mary's Cathedral, Perth.

On attaining retirement age of 75 years in April 2011, Hickey tendered his resignation as archbishop to Pope Benedict XVI, which was accepted on 20 February 2012 when Hickey's successor, Timothy Costelloe, was announced.

Hickey is Knight Commander with Star and Grand Prior of the Lieutenancy of Australia Western of the Order of the Holy Sepulchre.

=== Public stances ===
Hickey has challenged secularisation tendencies in the community. As an example, in 2010 he publicly questioned the lack of religious orientation of Julia Gillard, not long after her appointment as Prime Minister of Australia. He claimed that her atheism may cost her votes.

==== Stem cell research ====
On 5 June 2007 Hickey made a controversial statement by saying that if the Western Australian members of parliament who identified as Catholic did not oppose the Human Reproductive Technology Amendment Bill, which would allow expansion of stem cell research, then they could be refused Holy Communion or face excommunication as a last resort. Catholic and non-Catholic members of parliament criticised Hickey for this stance. Hickey reportedly said that he did not consider that he had made a threat. He also later said that he would not refuse Communion.

Catholics who vote for the cloning of embryos destined for destruction are acting against the teaching of the Church on a very serious matter and they should, in conscience, not vote that way, but if they do in conscience they should not go to Communion.

== Theological writing ==
After a holiday in Jerusalem in the mid-2000s Hickey authored a book, Living Biblically, that encouraged a return to the use and reading of the Bible. Hickey chose the title based on an article in The Tablet where the author had written about his experience of the charismatic movement in the United Kingdom.

In separate writings, Hickey shows his support and encouragement of the charismatic movement.

In February 2024, Hickey published a memoir titled My Spirit Land regarding his time in the Goldfields in Western Australia.

== Honours ==
Hickey was awarded the Medal of the Order of Australia (OAM) in 1982 for service to the community.

In 1998, Pope John Paul II named him Relator Generalis for the Oceania Synod in Rome. The government of Western Australia appointed Hickey to the Homeless Persons' Advisory Committee and the Western Australia Ethnic Affairs Advisory Committee. The Commonwealth government appointed him to the Board of the Institute of Family Studies and as a Member of the Australian Citizenship Council.

== Published works ==
- Couples preparing for marriage. Northcote, Victoria: Desbooks. 1983. ISBN 0-949824-04-6.
- Living Biblically – How to find answers to life's deepest question in God's Word. Leederville, Western Australia: Record Books. 2008. p. 96. ISBN 978-0-9802868-2-3.
- My Spirit Land - Memoirs of Barry J. Hickey. SKU: 9780646885759

Catholic Church titles
| Preceded by William Foley | 8th Catholic Archbishop of Perth; 1991–2012 | Succeeded by Timothy Costelloe |
