= Rosendo Salvado =

Spanish monk, missionary, bishop and musician

Dom Rosendo Salvado OSB
- 1st Roman Catholic abbot
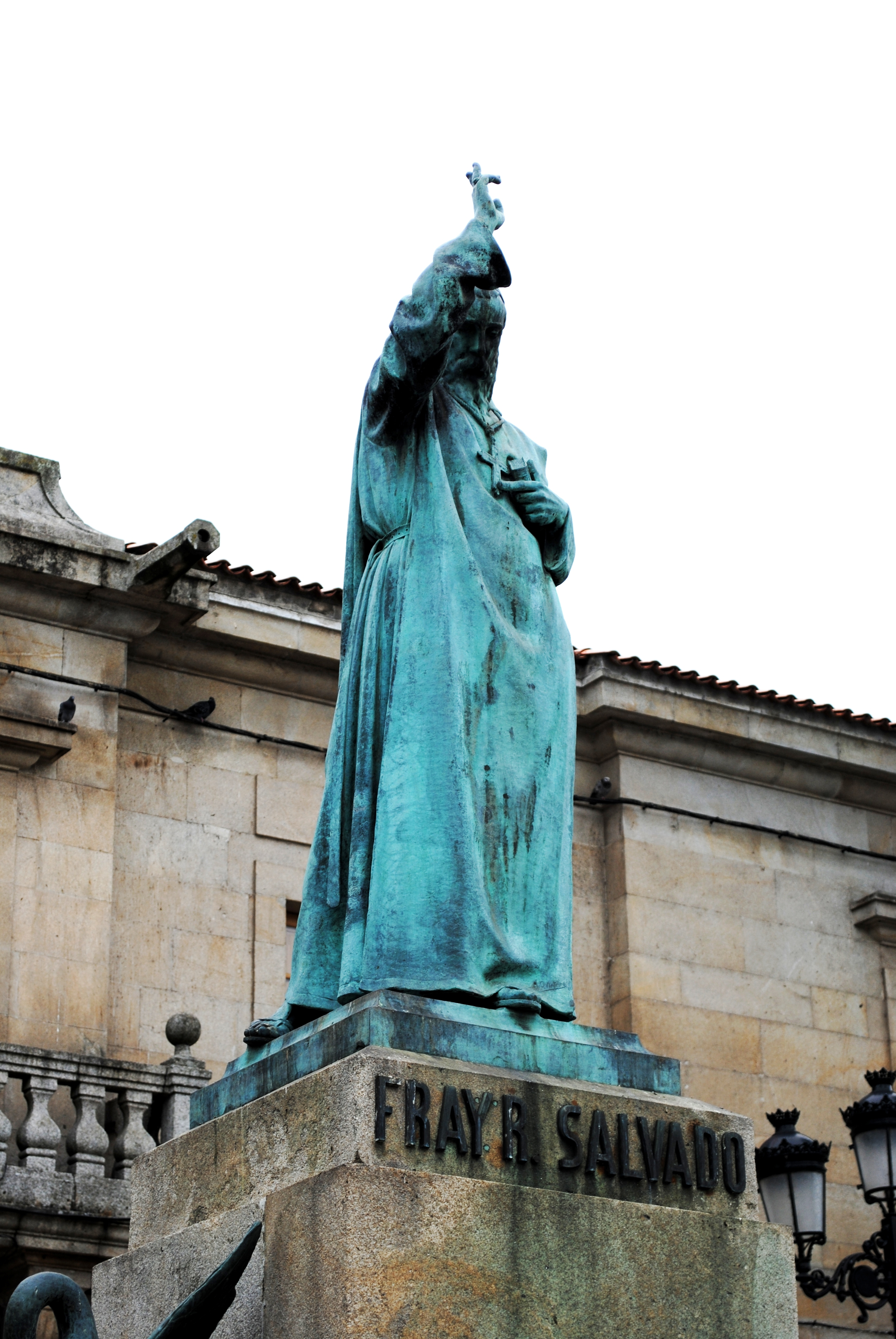
- Statute of Rosendo Salvado, located in his hometown of Tui, Pontevedra, Galicia, Spain
- Church: Territorial Abbey of New Norcia
- Diocese: Perth
- Installed: 12 March 1867
- Term ended: 29 December 1900
- Successor: Fulgentius Antonio Torres
- Other post: Bishop of Port Essington (1849 – 1867)

Orders
- Ordination: 23 February 1839 (Priest) in Naples
- Consecration: 15 August 1849 (Bishop)

Personal details
- Born: 1 March 1814 Tui, Pontevedra, Galicia, Spain
- Died: 29 December 1900 (aged 86) Basilica of Saint Paul Outside the Walls, Rome
- Buried: New Norcia
- Denomination: Roman Catholic Church
- Occupation: Roman Catholic bishop
- Profession: Cleric

Rosendo Salvado Rotea OSB (1 March 1814 – 29 December 1900) was a Spanish Benedictine monk, missionary, bishop, pianist, composer, author, founder and first abbot of the Territorial Abbey of New Norcia in Western Australia. Salvado introduced the blue gum to Galicia, a species which displaced the native Spanish chestnut and oak.

== Early life and background ==
Salvado was born at Tui, Galicia, Spain. At the age of 15 he entered the Benedictine Abbey of San Martin at Compostela. He was clothed in the habit in 1829 and took his final vows in 1832. In 1835, he was forced to flee to the Kingdom of the Two Sicilies, after the anti-Catholic government of Juan Álvarez Mendizábal decreed the closing of all monasteries and the secularisation of monks as a result of the First Carlist War. He was received into the Abbey of Trinità della Cava, near Naples, where he was ordained to the priesthood in February 1839.

== Mission ==
Desiring to work in foreign missions, he was permitted to do so after John Brady was consecrated as the first bishop of the Diocese of Perth. Along with Father José Benito Serra OSB, Salvado sailed from London with the bishop's party, landing in Fremantle in January 1846. On Brady's instruction, Salvado and Serra, with a small party of Benedictines, travelled to the Victoria Plains via ox-drawn cart. On 1 March 1846, they founded "The Central Mission" in the midst of the bush, intending to convert the Indigenous Australians to Catholicism. This was later renamed "New Norcia" after the birthplace of St. Benedict.

The priests soon established relations with the Nyungar people, but conditions at the mission proved so harsh that soon only Salvado and Serra remained. Salvado was an accomplished musician and in the first year of the mission he travelled back to Perth and on 21 May 1846 gave a well-received piano recital in tattered robes in the hall of the courthouse. The recital raised much needed funds for provisioning the new mission. Then, in 1848, Serra was appointed Bishop of Port Essington in the Northern Territory and later to coadjutor of the Diocese of Perth. In 1849, Salvado sailed for Europe to raise funds for the mission accompanied by two young Nyungar boys, Joseph Conaci and Francis Dirimera. Salvado was consecrated Bishop of Port Essington in August that year, much against his will, as he strongly desired to return to New Norcia. After Port Essington was abandoned, however, he was left as a bishop without an episcopal see.

While waiting permission to return to Australia, he wrote and published Memorie Storiche dell' Australia in March 1851. This book, which chronicled the beginnings of the mission and his relations with the Nyungar people, went through multiple printings in Italian, Spanish and French. It was published in English in 1977.

== Later life ==
He returned to Australia in 1853, accompanied by a large number of priests and monks bound for the Australian missions and especially for New Norcia. For four years he administered the Diocese of Perth during Bishop Serra's absence in Europe. He returned to New Norcia in 1857. In the following years he shifted the focus of the mission to serving the White settlers who were pouring into the area. In 1866 he was nominated as Bishop of Perth. In 1867, he was appointed "Lord Abbot" and the mission was upgraded to an independent abbey by Papal decree. He died in 1900 at the Basilica of Saint Paul Outside the Walls, while on a visit to Rome. His body was returned to New Norcia three years later and buried in a tomb of Carrara marble behind the high altar of the abbey church.

== Piano compositions ==
The few compositions for piano composed by Rosendo Salvado that have survived to our days are influenced by the Romanticism of his time, especially by Liszt and Thalberg, and by the Italian opera. The composition dates do not appear in the manuscripts.

His “Fantasía, variaciones y final” is dedicated to Countess Lebzeltern. The introduction, theme, six variations, and polonaise ending feature technically demanding piano writing and lyrical melodies inspired by Italian bel canto.

The “Tantum ergo”, whose text is based on the last verses of the medieval song Pange lingua by Saint Thomas Aquinas, is a piece for one or two voices and piano dedicated to Caterina Giordani. The word Tudensi appears in one of the voices, probably referring to the name of the native town of Salvado. It is inspired by the Italian opera of the time, containing two contrasting sections and culminating with a stretto to the Amen.

The “Pequeño entretenimiento con aire de marcha” begins with a tremolo that reminds us of the rolling of drums and, as indicated in a measure of the piece, it must be played with scioltezza. It is dedicated to Paquita Patrelli.

The “Gran walz fantástico ó sea, un cuarto de ora en la Tertulia”, dedicated to the Marchioness Santasilia, features demanding technical passages, a marching rhythm, improvisatory sections, and a lyrical passage before the coda that resembles Schubert's style.

The short piece “Maquialó”, subtitled Canción de baile de los Australianos Occidentales, is a piano reduction by Salvado of an Aboriginal dance used by the Yued people as motivation to work. Maquialó is said to mean moon in the sky.

The Spanish pianist Andrea González recovered the music of the Spanish monk Rosendo Salvado in an album (CD/DVD) published with Warner Music Spain.

== See also ==
- Asteroid 274856 Rosendosalvado
