= St Mary's Cathedral, Perth =

Roman Catholic Cathedral in Perth, Western Australia

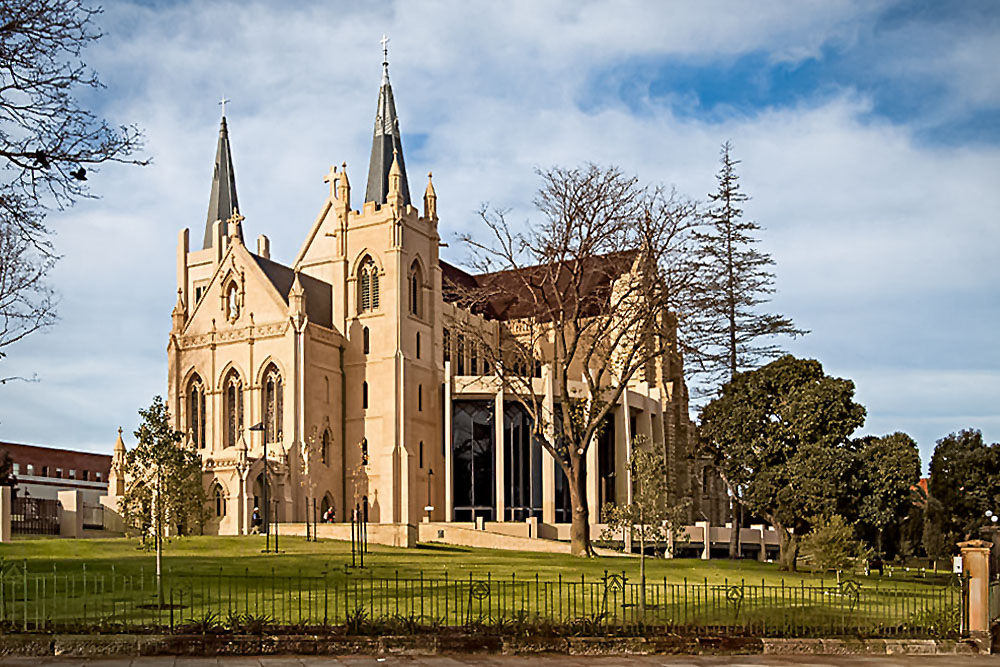
- The completed cathedral after repairs and expansion, pictured in July 2010
- St Mary's Cathedral, Perth
- 31°57′20″S 115°51′59″E
- Address: Perth, Western Australia
- Country: Australia
- Denomination: Roman Catholic
- Website: perthcatholic.org.au

History
- Status: Cathedral
- Founded: 18 February 1863
- Founder: Bishop of Perth Rosendo Salvado
- Dedication: Mary, mother of Jesus
- Consecrated: 29 January 1865 (Stage 1); 12 August 1973 (Stage 2); 9 December 2009 (Stage 3)

Architecture
- Functional status: Active
- Architect(s): Michael Cavanagh (Stage 2), Peter M. Quinn (Stage 3)
- Architectural type: Cathedral
- Style: Academic Gothic
- Years built: 1863 – 1910 (Stage 1); 1926 – 1973 (Stage 2); 2006 – 2009 (Stage 3)
- Completed: December 2009

Administration
- Archdiocese: Perth

Clergy
- Archbishop: Timothy Costelloe

Western Australia Heritage Register
- Official name: St Mary's Roman Catholic Cathedral
- Type: State Registered Place
- Designated: 10 October 1995
- Reference no.: 2124

St Mary's Cathedral, Perth, officially the Cathedral of the Immaculate Conception of the Blessed Virgin Mary, is an Australian cathedral. It is the cathedral church of the Roman Catholic Archdiocese of Perth and seat of its archbishop, currently Timothy Costelloe.

The cathedral as it now stands was constructed in three main phases, with the first phase completed in 1865. Plans were drawn up for the replacement of the cathedral in the 1920s with a larger Perpendicular Gothic edifice. However, construction was interrupted by the onset of the Great Depression, leaving a new transept and sanctuary, with the aisle of the original cathedral as its nave. After being incomplete for 70 years, with portions of the cathedral requiring extensive repair work, funds were eventually raised in the late 1990s and early 2000s for the completion of the expansion. A new curved design for the expansion was created, and featured a second spire and underground parish centre. The cathedral closed for construction in 2006, and reopened in December 2009.

The cathedral is located at the centre of Victoria Square, on the northern end of Victoria Avenue, Perth, Western Australia.

== History ==
The first Roman Catholic church in the colony was St John's Pro-Cathedral on Victoria Avenue. The colony eventually outgrew this small church, and the local Bishop expressed an interest in constructing a "more worthy Cathedral".

=== First stage: 1865 to 1930 ===
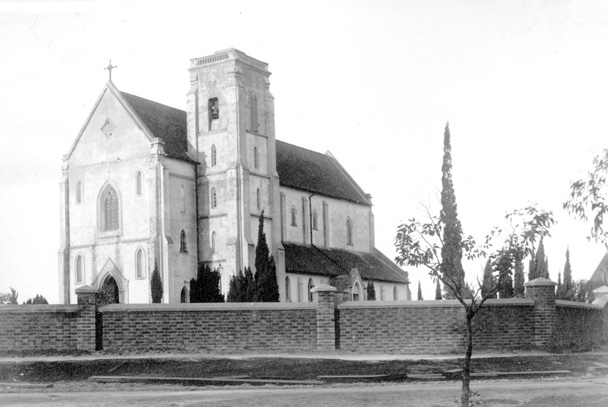
The original cathedral building in 1894

Benedictine brothers from Subiaco and New Norcia constructed the Bishop's Palace facing Victoria Square. The square had originally been named "Church Square and had been set aside for the construction of a Church of England cathedral. However, the early Anglicans in the colony considered the location to be too far from the centre of the fledgling colony, and instead constructed St George's Cathedral on what is now St Georges Terrace. Bishop Serra therefore applied to the governor of the colony to cede the land in Victoria Square to the Roman Catholic Church, which occurred on 13 August 1859.

Bishop Serra travelled to Rome and there received a donation of 1,000 scudi from Francis II of the Two Sicilies. He also secured a donation of marble from the Benedictine brothers of the Monastery of Saint Paul Outside the Walls, which was used to construct the cathedral's altar. The altar arrived at the colony in 1862.

On 8 February 1863, the Bishop of Perth, Rosendo Salvado, laid the foundation stone of the cathedral.

Because of labour and fund shortages, construction of the cathedral progressed slowly. Benedictine masons would walk daily between their monastery in Subiaco and the construction site. In January 1864, construction was suspended because of a lack of money. Eventually further funds were raised and the building completed, for a total cost of £4,000. The cathedral was blessed and opened on 29 January 1865.

Benedictine oblate Joseph Ascione designed the cathedral in the Norman Gothic style. The cathedral's walls were built from clay bricks from a property in Adelaide Terrace. Between 1897 and 1910, alterations were made to the cathedral to emphasise its Gothic character, including the addition of a spire to its bell tower.

=== Second stage: 1930 to 1999 ===
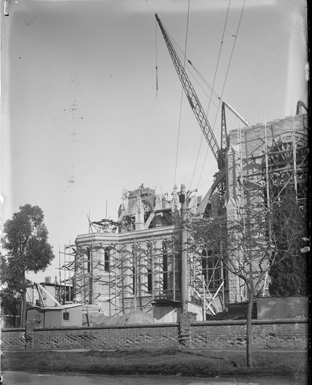
Expansion of the cathedral underway in 1929

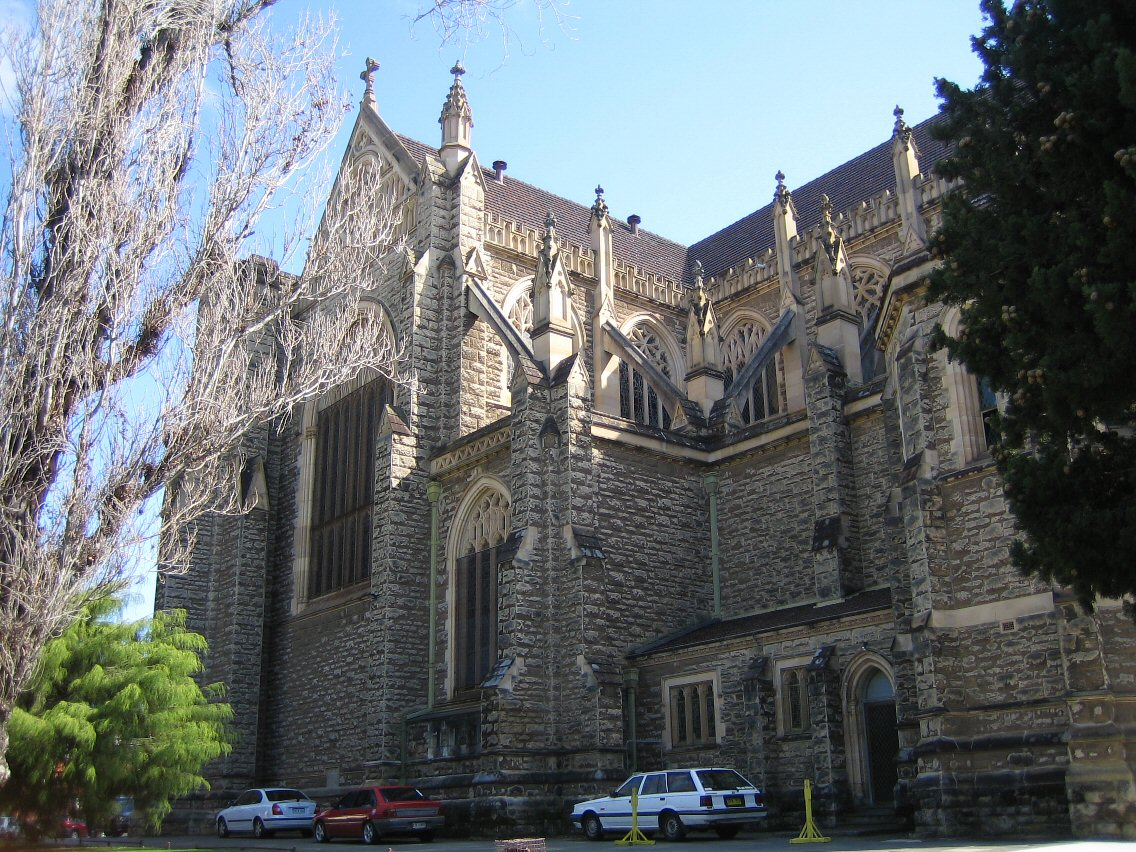
Apse and transept of the 1930 portion of the cathedral

In 1924, Bishop Clune started an appeal to fund the construction of a larger cathedral. Architect Michael Cavanagh designed the new cathedral in the Academic Gothic style. Architect John Cyril Hawes described the proposed design as "bastard Gothic" and proposed instead a large Romanesque cathedral. His plans were rejected, with the clergy instead opting for the Gothic design. Hawes went on to design St Francis Xavier's Cathedral, Geraldton.

The foundation stone was laid on 25 April 1926. Deteriorating economic conditions associated with onset of the Great Depression necessitated the scaling back of the project. The original cathedral, less its sanctuary, was retained as the nave of an expanded cathedral. Exposed metal bands were left protruding from the wall of the new transept, in preparation for completion of the cathedral in future generations.

The expansion work was undertaken by builders A. T. Brine and Sons, and it was built from stone from the same quarry as the General Post Office building. The sanctuary mosaics were made to designs found in the Book of Kells. The stained glass windows were designed and created in the United Kingdom by John Hardman of Birmingham. The marble altar from the original cathedral was relocated to the sanctuary of the expanded cathedral.

The expanded, but incomplete, St Mary's Cathedral opened on 4 May 1930.

Unfortunately the dream of completing St Mary's Cathedral is one that we must leave to future generations to complete.

— Archbishop Patrick Clune, upon the expansion's opening in 1930

[The] new sanctuary and transept ... was connected to the body of the old cathedral, but nobody then or since has considered the amalgam to be a complete cathedral architecturally, aesthetically or liturgically.

— Archbishop Barry Hickey, December 2003

In 1938 the cathedral's boys' choir was established, making it the oldest Catholic boys' choir in Australia today.

In 1973, the central altar and lectern were added to the sanctuary and the redesigned sanctuary was consecrated on 12 August 1973.

In 1995 the Heritage Council of Western Australia noted that the original 1865 portion of the structure was suffering from falling damp and cracking in the walls, and the mosaic floors in the sanctuary were also cracked. Further deterioration of the cathedral by the end of the 20th century meant that decisions had to be made in relation to the repair and completion of the original design.

=== Third stage: 1999 to present ===
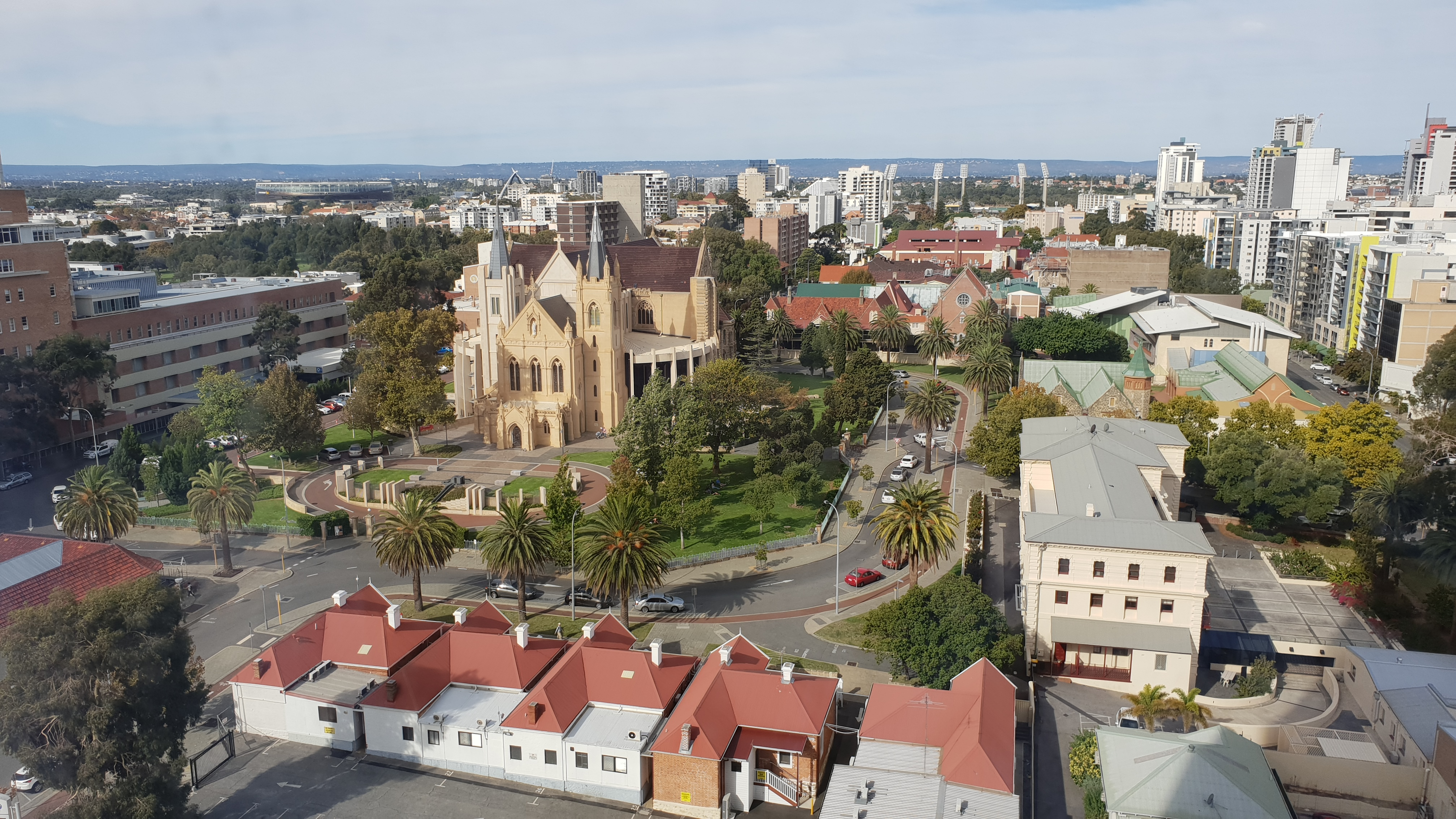
St Mary's Cathedral and diocesan precinct 2019

In mid-1999, after a bequest of $2 million by the estate of Jim and Alice Hassell, the archdiocese announced that it intended to finally complete the 1920s expansion; however construction was not expected to commence until 2001. Also, it took longer than expected to source funds for the expansion, delaying commencement of the project. In the 2005–06 federal budget, $3 million was set aside for the expansion, and a $2 million grant was received from the state government.

The cathedral was eventually closed in August 2006 for the commencement of construction. At this stage, the building was suffering from rising damp, a crumbling bell tower and structural weaknesses.

In 2006, after the closure of the cathedral for construction, the remains of Perth's first bishops were found beneath floorboards in the aisle, marked only by a small cross carved in the boards. As part of the restoration works, a permanent crypt for Perth's deceased bishops was to be constructed underneath the altar. The remains of Perth's first bishop, John Brady, were exhumed in 2011 from his grave in France and a few months later he was laid to rest in the crypt of St Mary's Cathedral.

The expansion project was overseen by the dean of the cathedral, Monsignor Thomas McDonald. Part of the restoration works involved hoisting the entire roof structure temporarily so that existing columns could be replaced and the walls reconfigured. The roof was then attached to a permanent steel structure.

By March 2007, increasing construction costs and the need for extra repair work meant that the project costs had blown out by $5 million. The costs had further blown out to $32.9 million by March 2009.

The new design includes increased seating for 1,600 people, a new underground parish centre and improved disabled access. It also adds a second spire to the church, which is not identical to the original spire because of a Heritage Council stipulation that the new spire not "shamelessly mimic" the existing one.

The completed cathedral was officially opened by the Archbishop of Perth, Barry Hickey, on 8 December 2009 in a ceremony attended by the apostolic nuncio as well as Cardinal George Pell, 33 bishops and around 300 priests.

The new design by Perth architect Peter M. Quinn won three architectural design awards from the Western Australian chapter of the Australian Institute of Architects: The Jeffrey Howlett Award, the George Temple Pool award and the Margaret Pitt Morrison Award for Heritage.

== Gallery ==
The old and new Cathedral

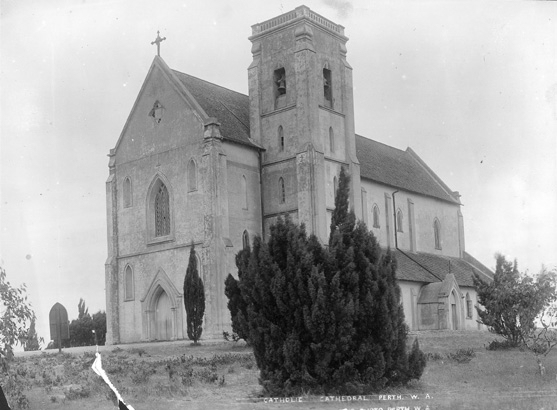
Original cathedral, circa 1890-1894

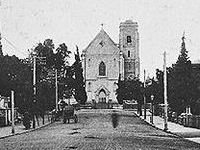
View along Murray Street to the cathedral, circa 1905

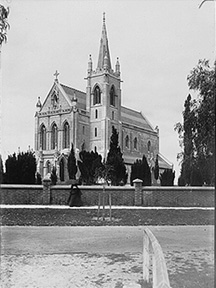
Cathedral with the spire installed, circa 1910

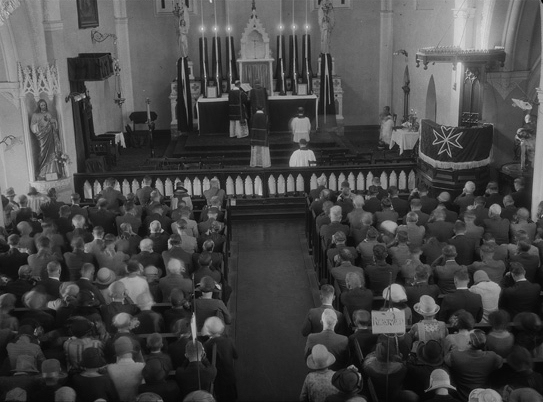
A service in the original cathedral in 1928

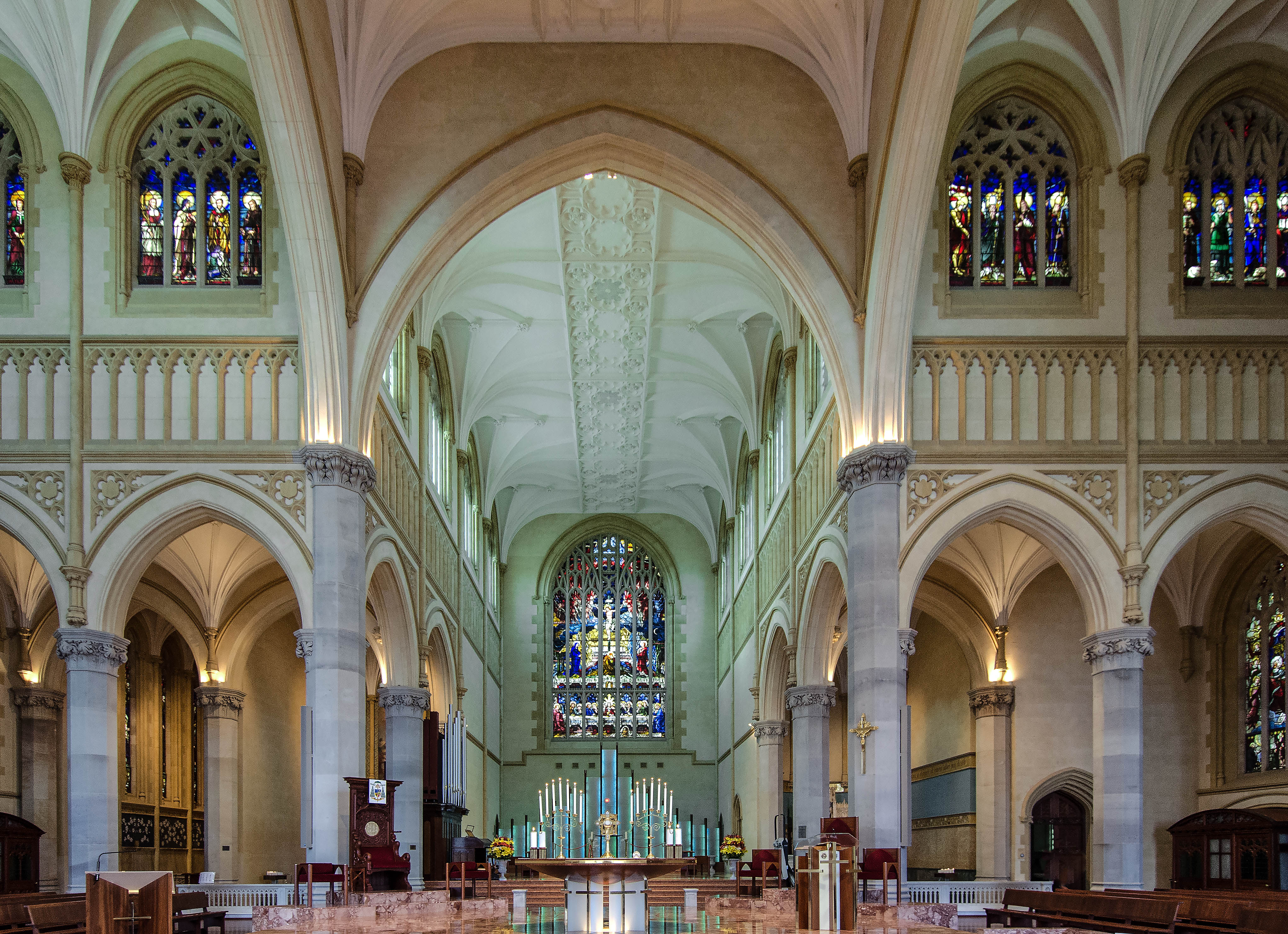
Interior facing east in 2014

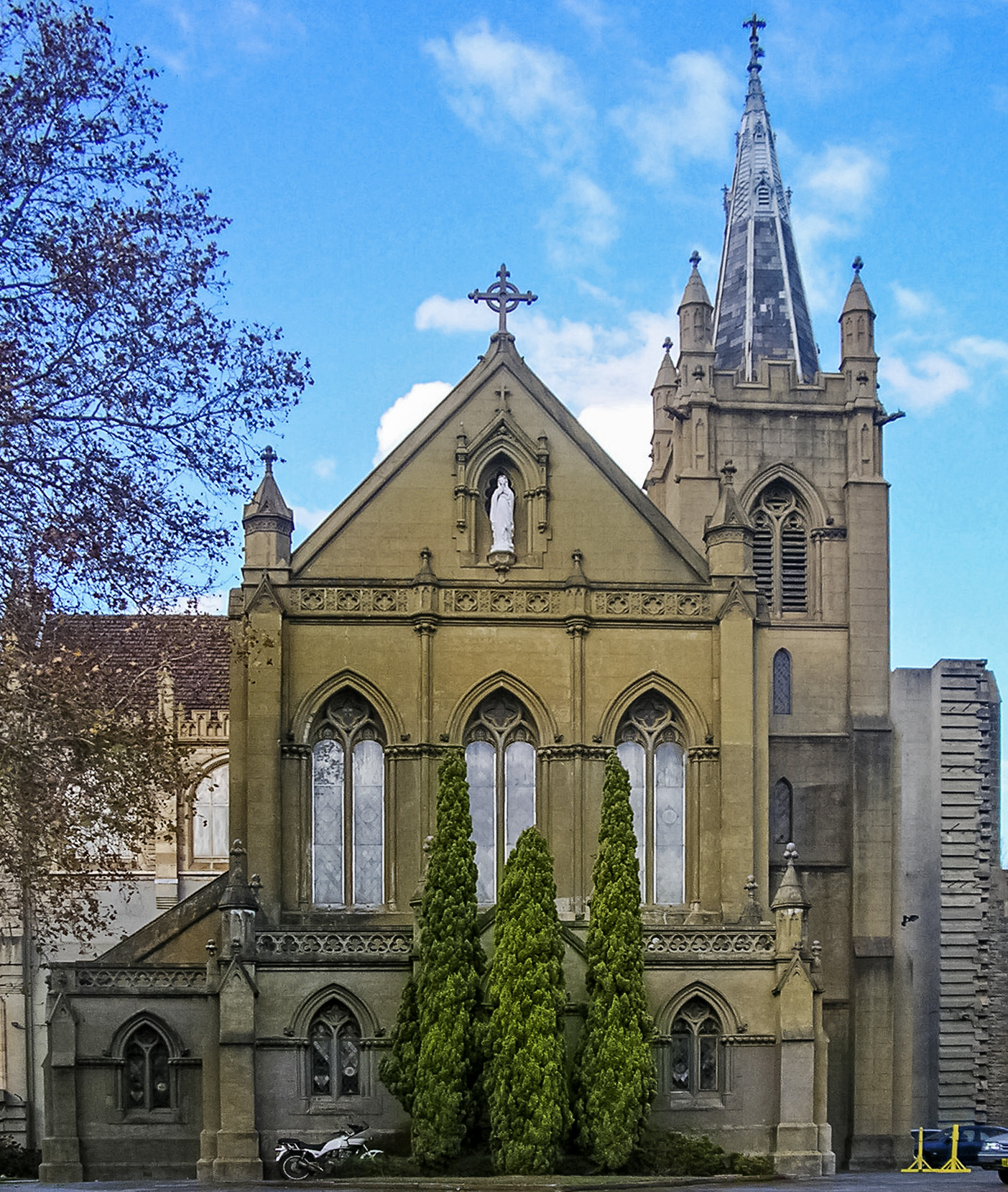
View from Victoria Square, 2006

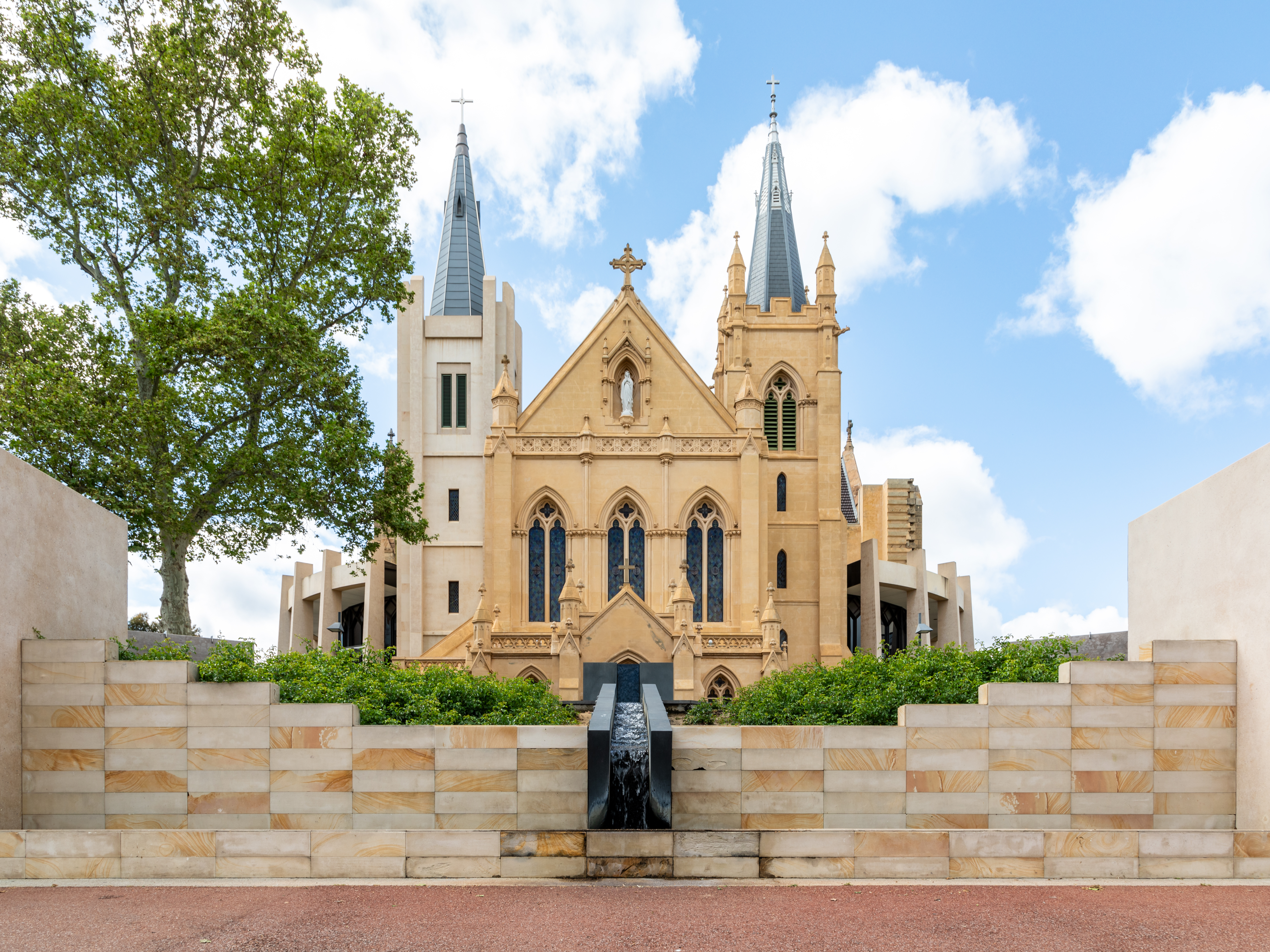
West front in 2019

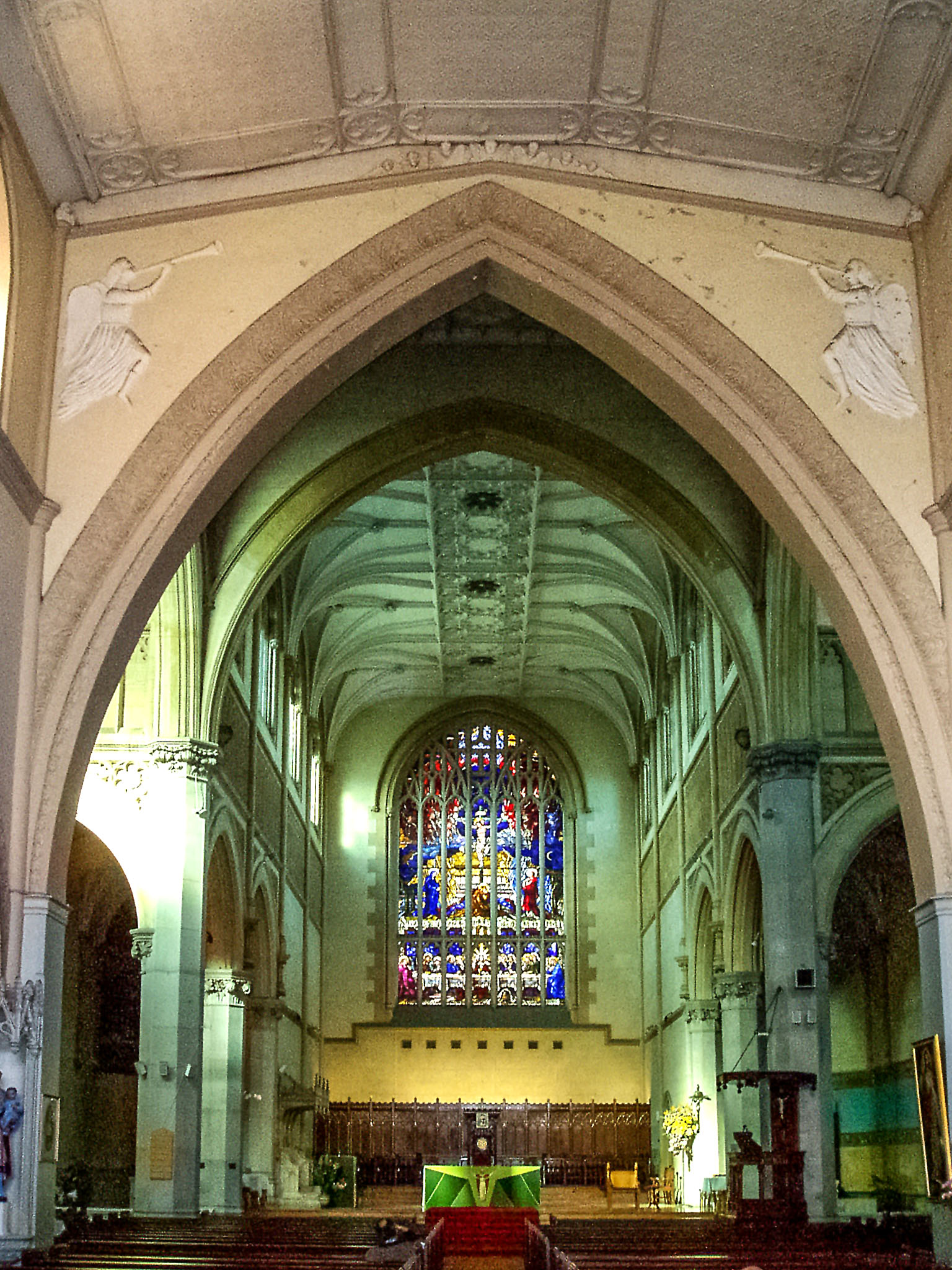
Interior of cathedral, taken from the now-demolished original portion of the cathedral

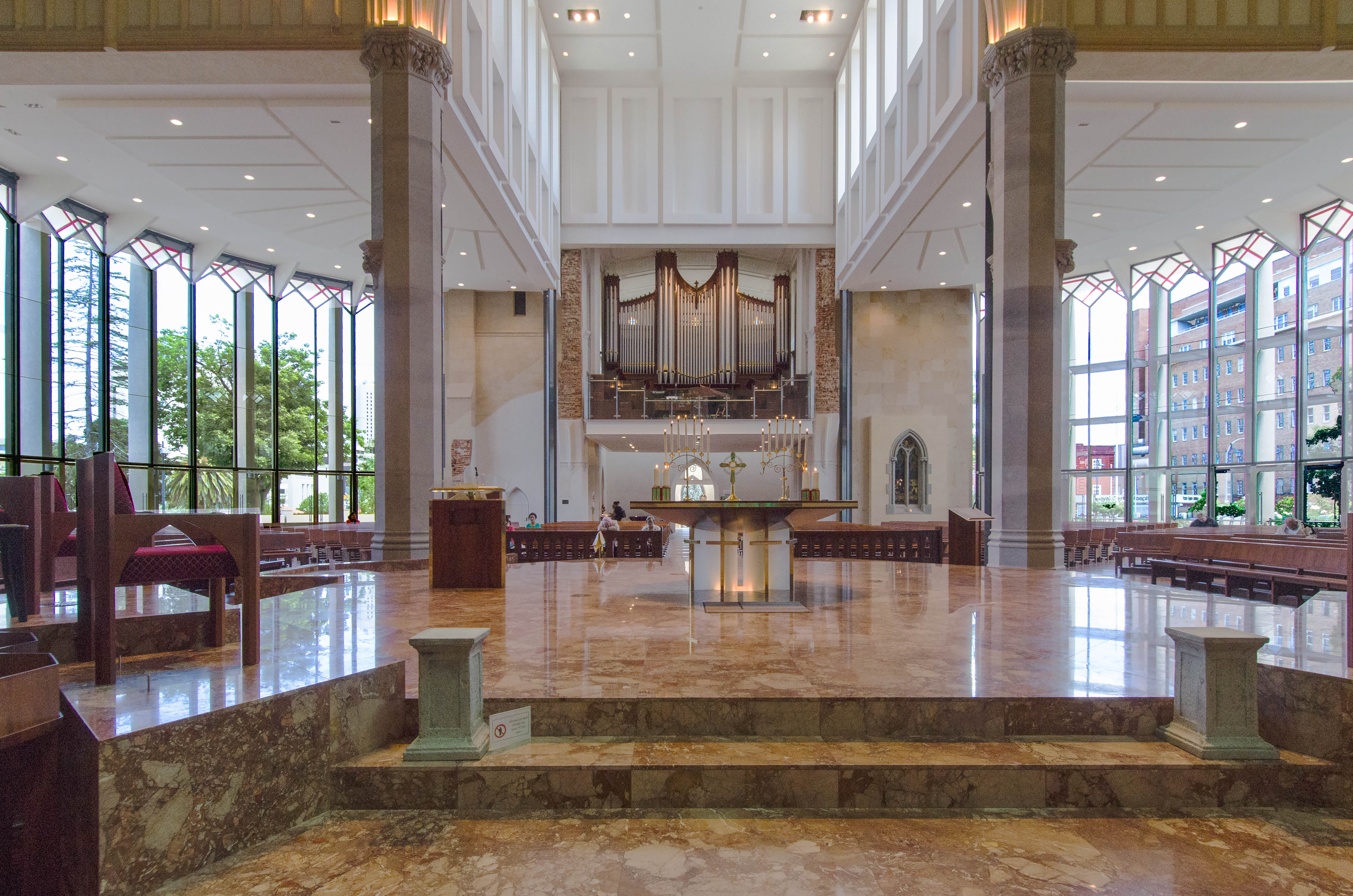
Interior of new section of the nave facing west in 2014

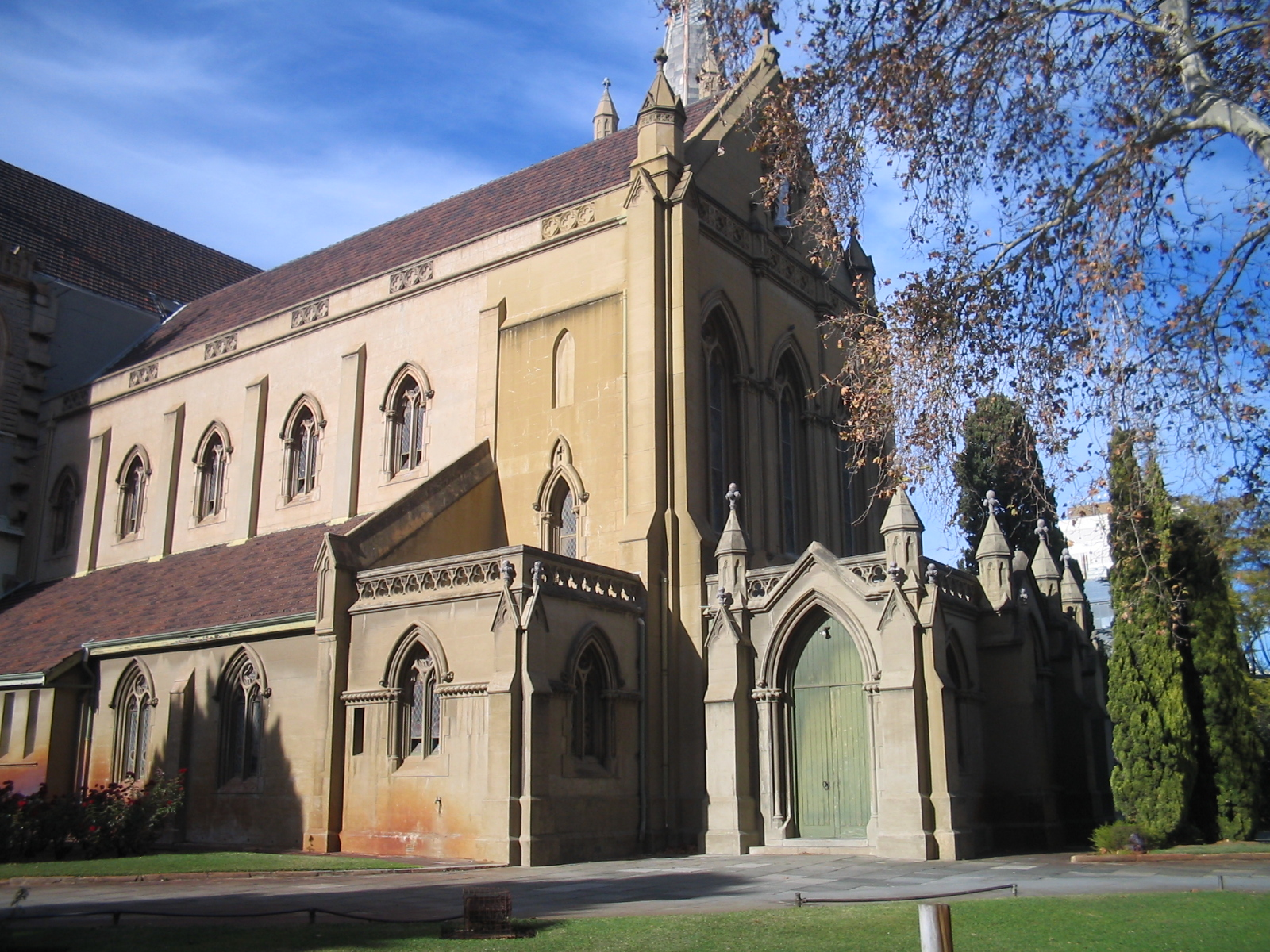
Exterior of the original portion of the cathedral, prior to the expansion work started in 2005

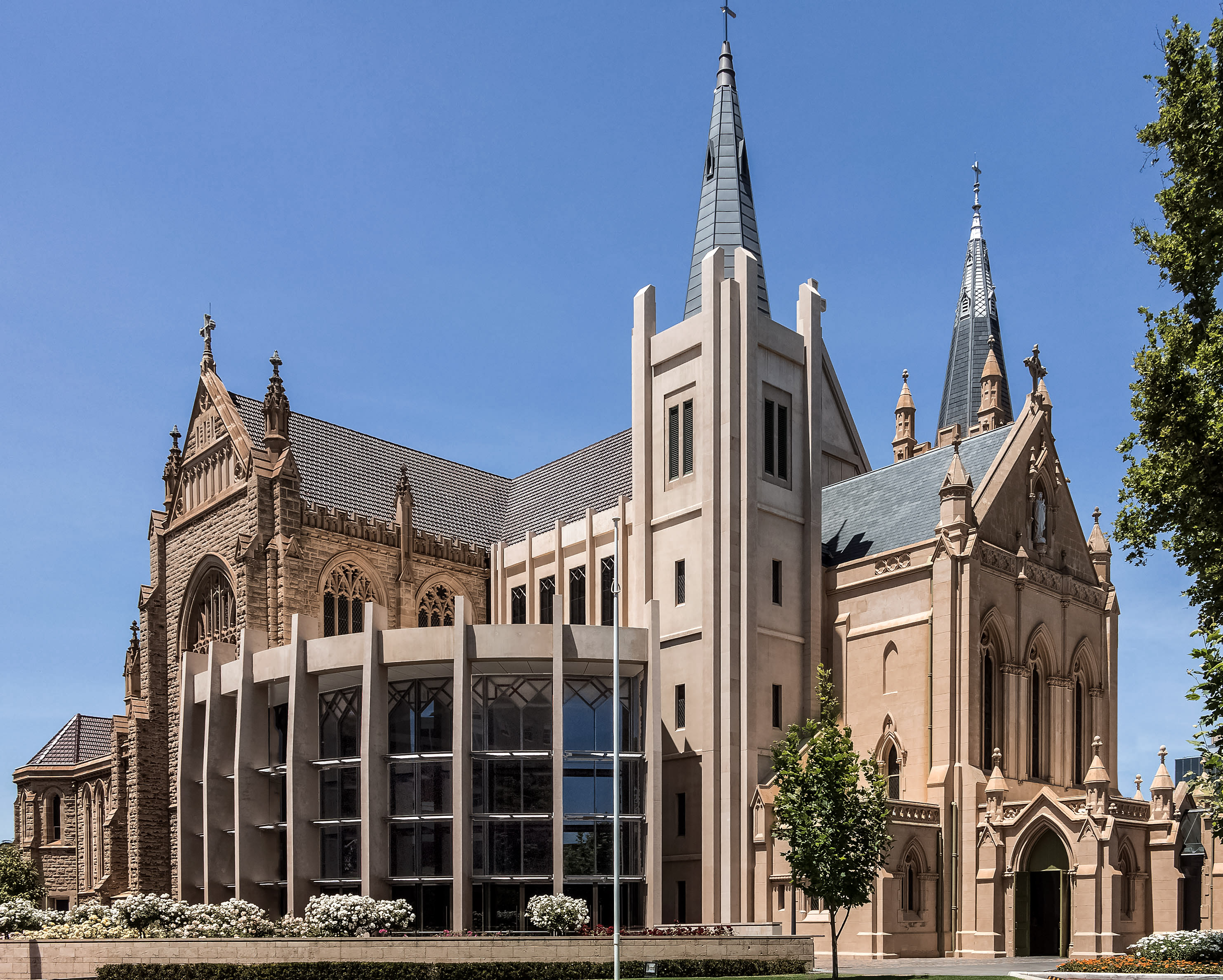
Exterior of the new side from the north west in 2014

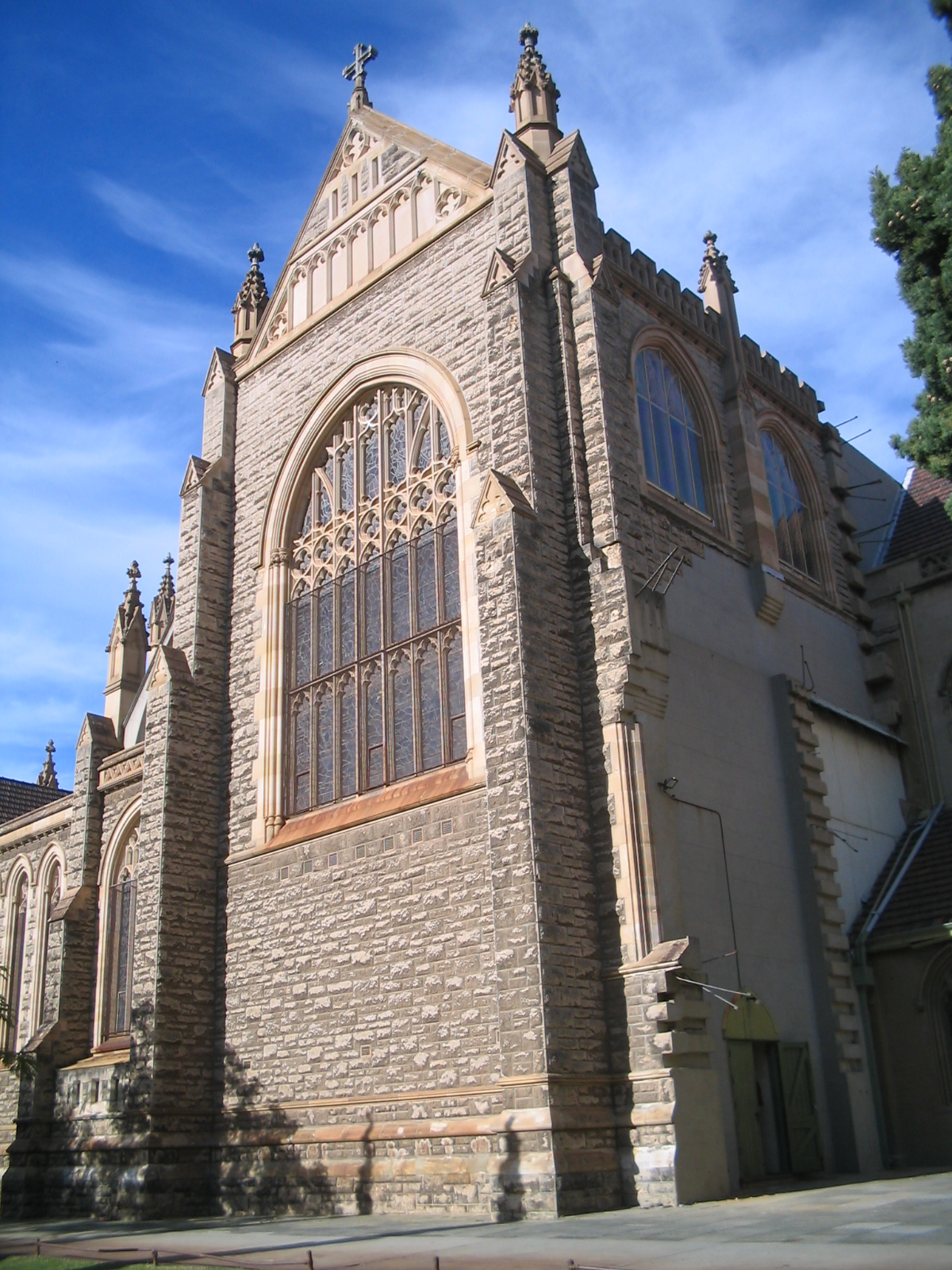
Exterior of the cathedral's transept in 2006 showing the incomplete section at the right

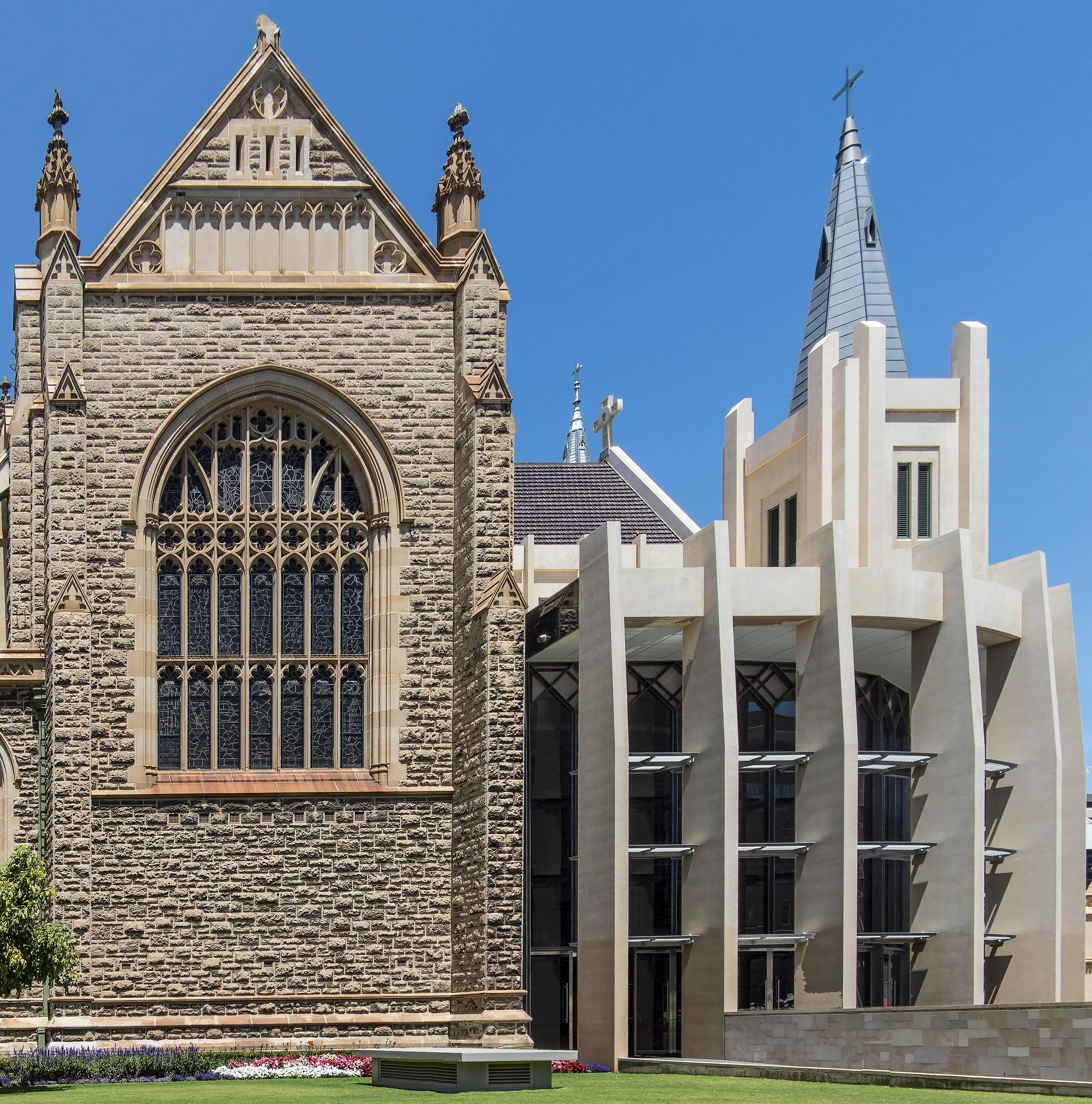
View from the north showing old and new styles in 2014

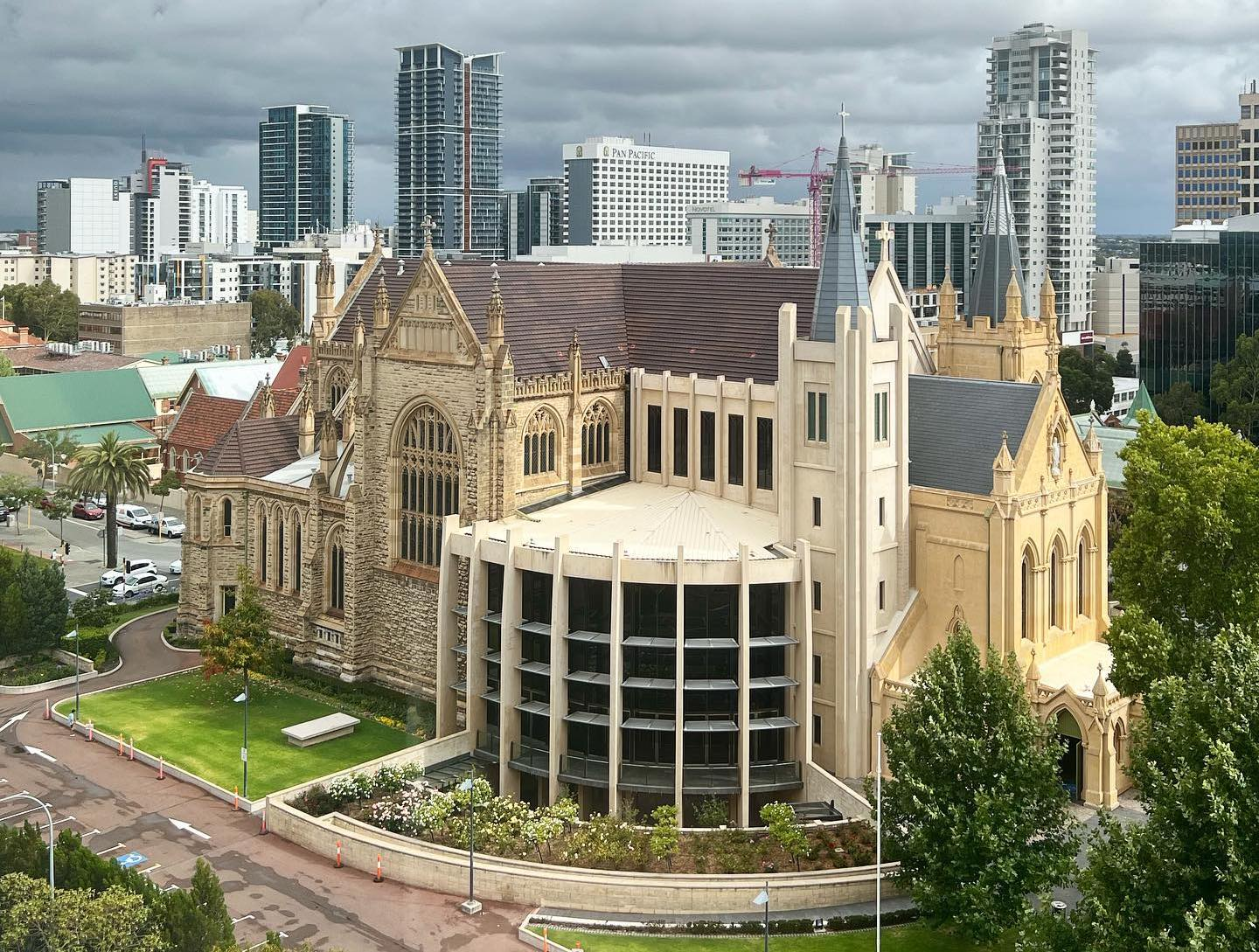
View from Royal Perth Hospital, 2021

== See also ==
- Roman Catholic Marian churches
- St John's Pro-Cathedral
