= List of Catholic bishops in Australia =

The following is a list of bishops of the Catholic Church in Australia. The Australian Catholic Church comprises seven archdioceses and 32 dioceses including six dioceses which cover the whole country: one each for those who belong to the Chaldean, Maronite, Melkite, Syro-Malabar and Ukrainian rites and one for those serving in the Australian Defence Forces. There is also a personal ordinariate for former Anglicans which has a similar status to a diocese. The church in Australia has five provinces: Adelaide, Brisbane, Melbourne, Perth and Sydney.

Each diocese is divided into an ecclesiastical province. Each province has a metropolitan archdiocese led by an archbishop, and at least one suffragan diocese.

The Chaldean, Maronite, Melkite, Syro-Malabar and Ukrainian rites are governed by an eparchy, an ecclesiastical unit in Eastern Christianity, that is equivalent to a diocese. All eparchies in Australia are immediately subject to the Holy See with the exception of the Ukrainian Eparchy of Ss Peter and Paul which falls under the authority of the Archdiocese of Melbourne, as a suffragan in the ecclesiastical province of the metropolitan Archbishop of Melbourne.

== Latin Church bishops ==
Ecclesiastical Province Map	Diocese	Diocese's Coat of Arms	Bishop	Title	Bishop's Coat of Arms
=== Ecclesiastical Province of Adelaide ===
	Archdiocese of Adelaide		Patrick O'Regan	Archbishop of Adelaide	
	Diocese of Darwin		Charles Gauci	Bishop of Darwin	
	Diocese of Port Pirie		Karol Kulczycki	Bishop of Port Pirie	
=== Ecclesiastical Province of Brisbane ===
	Archdiocese of Brisbane		Shane Mackinlay	Archbishop of Brisbane	
	Diocese of Cairns		Joseph Caddy	Bishop of Cairns	
	Diocese of Rockhampton		Daniel Meagher	Bishop of Rockhampton	
	Diocese of Toowoomba		Kenneth Howell	Bishop of Toowoomba	
	Diocese of Townsville		Timothy Harris	Bishop of Townsville	
=== Ecclesiastical Province of Melbourne ===
	Archdiocese of Melbourne		Peter Comensoli	Archbishop of Melbourne	
	Archdiocese of Melbourne		Martin Ashe	Auxiliary Bishop of Melbourne	
	Archdiocese of Melbourne		Thinh Xuan Nguyen	Auxiliary Bishop of Melbourne	
	Diocese of Ballarat		Mark Freeman	Bishop of Ballarat	
	Diocese of Sale		Gregory Bennet	Bishop of Sale	
	Diocese of Sandhurst		Rene Ramirez RCJ	Bishop of Sandhurst	
=== Ecclesiastical Province of Perth ===
	Archdiocese of Perth		Timothy Costelloe	Archbishop of Perth	
	Archdiocese of Perth		Donald Sproxton	Auxiliary Bishop of Perth	
	Archdiocese of Perth		Nelson Po	Auxiliary Bishop of Perth	
	Diocese of Broome		Tim Norton	Bishop of Broome	
	Diocese of Bunbury		George Kołodziej	Bishop of Bunbury	
	Diocese of Geraldton		Michael Morrissey	Bishop of Geraldton	
=== Ecclesiastical Province of Sydney ===
	Archdiocese of Sydney		Anthony Fisher	Archbishop of Sydney	
	Archdiocese of Sydney		Richard Umbers	Auxiliary Bishop of Sydney	
	Archdiocese of Sydney		Anthony Percy	Auxiliary Bishop of Sydney	
	Diocese of Armidale		Peter Murphy	Bishop of Armidale	
	Diocese of Bathurst		Michael McKenna	Bishop of Bathurst	
	Diocese of Broken Bay		Sede vacante	Bishop of Broken Bay	
	Diocese of Lismore		Gregory Homeming	Bishop of Lismore	
	Diocese of Maitland-Newcastle		Michael Kennedy	Bishop of Maitland-Newcastle	
	Diocese of Parramatta		Vincent Long Van Nguyen	Bishop of Parramatta	
	Diocese of Wagga Wagga		Mark Edwards	Bishop of Wagga Wagga	
	Diocese of Wilcannia-Forbes		Columba Macbeth-Green	Bishop of Wilcannia-Forbes	
	Diocese of Wollongong		Brian Mascord	Bishop of Wollongong	

=== Immediately subject to the Holy See ===
The following dioceses do not fall directly under an Ecclesiastical Province, although they may be associated with one, but are immediately subject to the Holy See.

Diocese Map	Diocese	Diocese Coat of Arms	Bishop	Title	Bishop's Coat of Arms
==== Archdiocese of Canberra and Goulburn ====
	Archdiocese of Canberra and Goulburn		Christopher Prowse	Archbishop of Canberra and Goulburn	
==== Archdiocese of Hobart ====
	Archdiocese of Hobart		Anthony Ireland	Archbishop of Hobart	
==== Diocese of the Australian Military Services ====
	Catholic Diocese of the Australian Military Services		Stuart Russell Hall	Bishop of the Military Ordinariate of Australia	
==== Personal Ordinariate of Our Lady of the Southern Cross ====
	Personal Ordinariate of Our Lady of the Southern Cross		Sede Vacante	Ordinary of the Personal Ordinariate of Our Lady of the Southern Cross	

=== Bishops emeriti ===
Province	Bishop	Title	Diocese
Adelaide	Eugene Hurley	bishop emeritus	Diocese of Darwin
Adelaide	Gregory O'Kelly	bishop emeritus	Diocese of Port Pirie
Brisbane	Mark Coleridge	archbishop emeritus	Archdiocese of Brisbane
Brisbane	Brian Finnigan	auxiliary bishop emeritus	Archdiocese of Brisbane
Brisbane	Joseph Oudeman	auxiliary bishop emeritus	Archdiocese of Brisbane
Brisbane	James Foley	bishop emeritus	Diocese of Cairns
Brisbane	Michael McCarthy	bishop emeritus	Diocese of Rockhampton
Brisbane	Brian Heenan	bishop emeritus	Diocese of Rockhampton
Brisbane	William Morris	bishop emeritus	Diocese of Toowoomba
Brisbane	Robert McGuckin	bishop emeritus	Diocese of Toowoomba
Melbourne	Denis Hart	archbishop emeritus	Archdiocese of Melbourne
Melbourne	Terence Curtin	auxiliary bishop emeritus	Archdiocese of Melbourne
Melbourne	Peter Connors	bishop emeritus	Diocese of Ballarat
Melbourne	Leslie Tomlinson	bishop emeritus	Diocese of Sandhurst
Perth	Barry Hickey	archbishop emeritus	Archdiocese of Perth
Perth	Christopher Saunders	bishop emeritus	Diocese of Broome
Perth	Gerard Holohan	bishop emeritus	Diocese of Bunbury
Perth	Justin Bianchini	bishop emeritus	Diocese of Geraldton
Sydney	David Cremin	auxiliary bishop emeritus	Archdiocese of Sydney
Sydney	Terence Brady	auxiliary bishop emeritus	Archdiocese of Sydney
Sydney	David Walker	bishop emeritus	Diocese of Broken Bay
Sydney	Geoffrey Jarrett	bishop emeritus	Diocese of Lismore
Sydney	Michael Malone	bishop emeritus	Diocese of Maitland-Newcastle
Sydney	Gerard Hanna	bishop emeritus	Diocese of Wagga Wagga
Hobart	Julian Porteous	archbishop emeritus	Archdiocese of Hobart
Hobart	Adrian Doyle	archbishop emeritus	Archdiocese of Hobart
Military Ordinariate	Max Davis	bishop emeritus	Diocese of the Australian Military Services
Personal Ordinariate	Harry Entwistle	ordinary emeritus	Personal Ordinariate of Our Lady of the Southern Cross
Personal Ordinariate	Carl Reid	ordinary emeritus	Personal Ordinariate of Our Lady of the Southern Cross

== Eastern Catholic Eparchs ==
Ukrainian Catholic Eparchy of Saints Peter and Paul of Melbourne

The Eparchy of Saints Peter and Paul of Melbourne is a suffragan in the ecclesiastical province of the metropolitan Archbishop of Melbourne, a Latin Church territory.

Metropolia	Metropolia Map	Eparchy	Bishop	Title	Bishop Coat of Arms
Melbourne		Ukrainian Catholic Eparchy of Saints Peter and Paul of Melbourne	Mykola Bychok	eparchial bishop	

Eastern Catholic eparchs whose eparchies are immediately subject to the Holy See

The other Eastern Catholic Churches with eparchies (dioceses) or exarchates established in Australia are not grouped into provinces although may be associated with them. All are immediately subject to the Holy See, with limited oversight by the head of their respective sui iuris churches.

Church	Metropolia Map	Eparchy	Bishop	Title	Bishop Coat of Arms
Chaldean		Chaldean Catholic Eparchy of Saint Thomas the Apostle of Sydney	Sede vacante	Eparch	
Melkite Greek		Melkite Greek Catholic Eparchy of Saint Michael Archangel in Sydney	Robert Rabbat	Eparch	
Maronite		Maronite Catholic Eparchy of Saint Maron of Sydney	Antoine-Charbel Tarabay	Eparch	
Syro-Malabar		Syro-Malabar Catholic Eparchy of Melbourne	John Panamthottathil	Eparch	

=== Eparchs emeriti ===
Eparchs/ Bishops	Title	Eparchy
Bosco Puthur	bishop emeritus	Syro-Malabar Catholic Eparchy of Melbourne
Jibrael Kassab	eparch emeritus	Chaldean Catholic Eparchy of Saint Thomas the Apostle of Sydney
Issam Darwish	eparch emeritus	Melkite Greek Catholic Eparchy of Saint Michael Archangel in Sydney
Ad Abikaram	eparch emeritus	Maronite Catholic Eparchy of Saint Maron of Sydney

== Australian bishops serving outside Australia ==
- Bernard Cyril O'Grady, Bishop Emeritus of Gizo, Solomon Islands
- Douglas William Young, Archbishop of Mount Hagen, Papua New Guinea

=== Bishops serving in Vatican City ===
- Anthony Randazzo, Prefect of the Dicastery for Legislative Texts

== Non-Australian bishops serving in Australia ==
- Charles Balvo, Apostolic Nunciature to Australia

== Non-Australian bishops who have previously served in Australia ==
- Paul III Nona, Chaldean Catholic Patriarchate of Baghdad, formerly Archbishop of Saint Thomas the Apostle of Sydney from 2015 to 2026
