= Eugene Hurley =

Australian clergyman (born 1940)

The Most Reverend Daniel Eugene Hurley
- Bishop Emeritus of Darwin
- Church: Roman Catholic Church
- Diocese: Darwin
- See: Darwin
- Appointed: 3 July 2007
- Installed: 29 August 2007
- Term ended: 27 June 2018
- Predecessor: Edmund Collins
- Successor: Charles Gauci
- Previous post: Bishop of Port Pirie (1998–2007)

Orders
- Ordination: 27 June 1964 by Bryan Gallagher
- Consecration: 12 February 1999 by Leonard Anthony Faulkner

Personal details
- Born: Daniel Eugene Hurley; 21 April 1940 (age 86) Orroroo, South Australia, Australia

Daniel Eugene Hurley AM (born 21 April 1940) is an Australian clergyman who was the sixth bishop of the Catholic Diocese of Darwin, having served in this position from 29 August 2007 until he retired on 27 June 2018.

== Early life ==
Hurley was born in Orroroo, South Australia and raised in the Flinders Ranges. He attending the local primary school in Carrieton then moved to Sacred Heart College in Adelaide as a boarder, to complete his secondary schooling. Immediately after graduating, he entered St Francis Xavier Seminary, Adelaide to study for the priesthood.

== Priesthood ==
Hurley was ordained a priest for the Diocese of Port Pirie on 27 June 1964 at St Mark's Cathedral, Port Pirie by Bishop Bryan Gallagher.

During his priestly ministry, he served in the parishes of Port Lincoln, Port Pirie, Cummins and Whyalla. He was also a keen sportsman as a priest, playing intercity cricket for many years. In 1973, he won the Grewar Medal for the most outstanding playing in the Port Pirie Cricket Association.

He also served as an Army Chaplain from early on in his ministry. In the 1990s, he also worked part-time at the University of South Australia, lecturing in Australian sociology, philosophy and counselling.

== Episcopate ==
On 27 November 1998, while serving as parish priest of Whyalla, Hurley was appointed Bishop of Port Pirie by Pope John Paul II. He was ordained a bishop on 12 February 1999 by Archbishop Leonard Anthony Faulkner at St Mark's Cathedral, Port Pirie.

In 2001, along with Archbishop Faulkner, he was forced to close St Francis Xavier Seminary, Adelaide due to insufficient student numbers.

On 3 July 2007, Hurley was appointed Bishop of Darwin by Pope Benedict XVI following the resignation of Bishop Edmund Collins MSC, who led the Diocese for more than two decades.

While Bishop of Darwin, he served as Deputy Chair of Caritas Australia and Chair of the Bishops’ Commission for Relations with Aborigines and Torres Strait Islanders. He became a strong advocate for the marginalised and forgotten people of regional South Australia and the Northern Territory. He also promoted the welfare of Aboriginal people throughout Australia, aspiring to make real change in their communities.

== Retirement ==
On 21 April 2015, Hurley turned 75 and was canonically retired to submit his resignation to Pope Francis. His resignation wasn't accepted for another three years. He finally retired on 27 June 2018, when Bishop Charles Gauci was announced as his successor.

In the 2019 Australia Day Honours, Hurley was made a Member of the Order of Australia (AM) for "significant service to the Catholic Church in Australia, and to the community of the Northern Territory".

Catholic Church titles
Preceded by Francis Peter de Campo	Bishop of Port Pirie; 1998–2007	Succeeded by Gregory O'Kelly
Preceded by Edmund Collins	Bishop of Darwin; 2007–2018	Succeeded by Charles Gauci
