= Thomas McCabe (bishop) =

Australian Catholic bishop (1902–1983)

The Most Reverend Thomas McCabe
- Bishop emeritus of Diocese of Wollongong
- Diocese: Wollongong
- Installed: 23 February 1952
- Term ended: 10 May 1974
- Successor: William Edward Murray
- Other post: Bishop of Diocese of Port Augusta (1939–1951)

Orders
- Ordination: 20 December 1925 at Rome by Willem Marinus van Rossum
- Consecration: 12 March 1939 at St Carthage's Cathedral, Lismore by Giovanni Panico

Personal details
- Born: Thomas Absolam McCabe; 30 June 1902 South West Rocks, New South Wales, Australia
- Died: 14 September 1983 (aged 81) Glebe, Australia
- Denomination: Catholic Church
- Occupation: Catholic bishop
- Education: Pontificio Collegio Urbano de Propaganda Fide

Thomas Absolam McCabe (30 June 1902 – 14 September 1983) was an Australian bishop of the Catholic Church. He served as the first bishop of the Diocese of Wollongong. Prior to that, he had served as Bishop of Port Augusta. He was a Council Father of the Second Vatican Council.

== Early life ==
McCabe was born in South West Rocks, New South Wales, the eldest of 11 children. He came from a very devout Catholic family. Four of his five sisters became nuns of the Sisters of the Good Samaritan and he had five cousins who had also joined religious orders.

He was educated at the Convent of the Good Samaritan, Macksville by the Sisters of the Good Samaritan. He then studied at Marist Brother's, Lismore before proceeding to St Columba's College, Springwood and then St Patrick's College, Manly to study for the priesthood. He then went on to study at the Pontificio Collegio Urbano de Propaganda Fide.

== Priesthood ==
On 20 December 1925, McCabe was ordained a priest for the Diocese of Lismore in Rome by Cardinal Willem Marinus van Rossum. He was ordained alongside Ernest Victor Tweedy, the future Archbishop of Hobart, and Ngô Đình Thục, a future sedevacantist bishop, who was excommunicated twice by the Catholic Church before being reconciled.

His first appointment upon returning to Australia was as an assistant priest at Coraki, before being transferred to South Grafton. He then became administrator of St Carthage's Cathedral, Lismore in 1931.

== Episcopate ==
On 13 December 1938, McCabe was appointed Bishop of Port Augusta. His consecration took place on 12 March 1939 at St Carthage's Cathedral, Lismore at the hands of Archbishop Giovanni Panico, the Apostolic Delegate to Australia. At the time of his consecration, he was the youngest bishop in Australia.

On 15 November 1951, McCabe was appointed the first bishop of the newly erected Diocese of Wollongong. He was enthroned on 24 February 1952 at St Francis Xavier's Cathedral, Wollongong

As Bishop of Wollongong, he attended all four sessions of the Second Vatican Council between 1962 and 1965.

On 5 June 1964, he was appointed Bishop of the Australian Armed Forces but resigned in 1969 when Pope Paul VI created the military vicariate of Australia.

== Retirement and Death ==
On 10 May 1974, McCabe resigned as Bishop of Wollongong due to ill health. He retired to Polding Villa, Glebe and died there on 14 September 1983.

Catholic Church titles
Preceded by Norman Gilroy	Bishop of Port Augusta; 1939–1951	Succeeded by Bryan Gallagher
Preceded by —	Bishop of Wollongong; 1952–1974	Succeeded by William Edward Murray
