= William Edward Murray =

Australian Roman Catholic bishop (1920–2013)

- Bishop of Wollongong
- Church: Roman Catholic
- See: Wollongong
- In office: 1975–1996
- Predecessor: Thomas McCabe
- Successor: Philip Wilson

Orders
- Ordination: 21 July 1945; St Mary's Cathedral, Sydney by Norman Gilroy
- Consecration: 21 July 1975; St Francis Xavier's Cathedral, Wollongong by James Freeman

Personal details
- Born: 16 February 1920 Leichhardt, New South Wales, Australia
- Died: 21 April 2013 (aged 93) Sydney, Australia

William Edward Murray AM (16 February 1920 – 21 April 2013) was an Australian bishop of the Roman Catholic Church.

== Early life ==
Murray was born in Leichhardt, the eldest son of Michael and Phyllis Murray. He was raised in Earlwood and attended Our Lady of Lourdes Church, Earlwood. He received his early education from the Sisters of Mercy at the Convent School, Earlwood, before receiving his secondary education at De La Salle College, Marrickville. In 1938, he was accepted as a student at St Columba's College, Springwood to begin studies for the priesthood.

== Priesthood ==
Murray was ordained as a priest for the Archdiocese of Sydney on 21 July 1945 at St Mary's Cathedral, Sydney by Archbishop Norman Thomas Gilroy. He became the first priest to be ordained for the Earlwood Parish and the first former student of De La Salle College, Marrickville to be ordained.

He received his first appointment as assistant priest at Bondi. He was then appointed to Rockdale in 1947. He later served at Elizabeth Bay, Meadowbank and Dulwich Hill.

In Rome, he received a doctorate in Social Science in 1958. He later returned to Sydney and became a spokesman for the Archdiocese of Sydney, director of the Catholic Information Bureau, and rector of St Columba's College, Springwood.

== Episcopate ==
On 5 June 1975, Murray was appointed bishop of the Diocese of Wollongong following the resignation of Bishop Thomas Absolem McCabe due to poor health. He was consecrated on 21 July 1975 at St Francis Xavier's Cathedral, Wollongong.

He oversaw the Diocese of Wollongong. The growing population of the Macarthur region led to new parishes being constructed.

He was awarded a Member of the Order of Australia on 26 January 1988 for services to religion.

== Retirement and death ==
Murray retired as Bishop of Wollongong on 12 April 1996, having tendered his resignation upon reaching the canonical retirement age of 75. Upon his retirement, he received criticism for his handling of sexual abuse by clergy in the Diocese of Wollongong.

Murray died on 21 April 2013, aged 93, at a Sydney nursing home.

Catholic Church titles
Preceded by Thomas Absolem McCabe	Bishop of Wollongong; 1975–1996	Succeeded by Philip Wilson
