= Edmund Collins =

- Bishop
- Church: Roman Catholic
- Diocese: Darwin, Northern Territory, Australia
- Appointed: 3 July 1986
- Term ended: 3 July 2007
- Predecessor: John Patrick O'Loughlin
- Successor: Eugene Hurley

Personal details
- Born: 22 March 1931 Braidwood, New South Wales, Australia
- Died: 8 August 2014 (aged 83) Sydney, New South Wales, Australia
- Motto: Cor Unum (One heart)

Edmund John Patrick Collins AM was the Roman Catholic Bishop of Darwin, Australia, from 1986 to 2007.

== Early life ==
Collins was born in Braidwood, New South Wales in 1931, the youngest of five children in an Irish-Catholic family, and grew up in Bermagui. His mother died when he was five.

At the age of 16, Collins moved to Sydney and joined the police service as a cadet, before becoming a probationary constable at 19.

== Priesthood ==
In 1953, shortly before he turned 23, Collins attended a day of recollection at Kensington Monastery with a group of Catholic police; it was here that he first felt drawn to the priesthood. The following year, aged 24, Collins resigned from the police force to join the Missionaries of the Sacred Heart at Douglas Park. After two years of initial studies and preparation, in 1956 he took his first vows and moved to Croydon Monastery in Melbourne to study for the priesthood. After completing his theological studies, he was ordained a priest in 1963, at age 32, and appointed to the parish of Randwick (Our Lady of the Sacred Heart Church) in Sydney.

Collins remained at Randwick for four years, after which he was transferred to Hindmarsh parish in Adelaide, for three years, and then to Nightcliff parish in Darwin. He returned to Randwick in 1978 and remained there as parish priest until 1985, after which he went on a sabbatical.

=== Other responsibilities ===
During the 1970s, Collins was Director of Catholic Missions for the Darwin Diocese, and Superior of the Missionaries of the Sacred Heart in the Northern Territory.

== Bishop of Darwin ==
On 3 July 1986 Collins was consecrated bishop of Darwin; he adopted the motto Cor Unum ("one heart").

In November 1986, Collins accompanied Pope John Paul II as he visited Darwin and Alice Springs as part of the Australian papal tour. While in Alice Springs the Pope gave a speech to Aboriginal and Torres Strait Islander peoples, which inspired Collins to encourage Indigenous Catholics to express their Aboriginality within their Catholic faith, allowing the use of didgeridoos, clapsticks and smoking ceremonies as part of Mass.

Collins was a public advocate for Indigenous people who were taken from their families as children.

When the Northern Territory legalised euthanasia in 1995, Collins campaigned publicly against the law, and "almost certainly contributed to" its overturning in 1997 by the Federal Government.

In the 1999 Australia Day Honours Collins was made a Member of the Order of Australia (AM) for "service to the community through the Catholic Church as Bishop of Darwin, and to the Aboriginal community".

Collins retired in 2007. He died on 8 August 2014 at the St Joseph's Aged Care Home in Kensington, and was interred in a crypt at Saint Mary's Cathedral, Darwin.

Ted Collins Village, a housing complex opened in 2011 and run by the St Vincent de Paul Society in Darwin, is named after him.

== Cyclone Tracy recording ==
Collins was in Darwin when it was struck by Cyclone Tracy in 1974. When the cyclone hit, he switched on a tape recorder, and recorded the sounds of the storm. The recording is now in the Museum and Art Gallery of the Northern Territory, as part of the Cyclone Tracy exhibit.
