= Stuart Hall (bishop) =

Australian Latin Catholic bishop (born 1962)

Most Reverend Stuart Hall
- Bishop of the Australian Military Ordinariate
- See: Military Ordinariate of Australia
- Appointed: 3 July 2026
- Installed: 29 August 2026

Orders
- Ordination: 19 September 1987 by Thomas Francis Little
- Consecration: 29 August 2026 by Peter Comensoli, Anthony Fisher and Christopher Prowse

Personal details
- Born: Stuart Russell Hall; 21 August 1962 (age 64) Melbourne, Victoria, Australia
- Denomination: Catholic Church
- Education: Corpus Christi College
- Motto: Pax Christi Mihi Est Dux
- Coat of arms
- Military career
- Allegiance: Australia
- Branch: Royal Australian Navy
- Service years: 1991–2016
- Rank: Principal Chaplain

Ordination history of Stuart Hall
History
Priestly ordination
- Ordained by: Frank Little (Melbourne)
Episcopal consecration
- Principal consecrator: Peter Comensoli (Melbourne)
- Co-consecrators: Anthony Fisher (Sydney) and Christopher Prowse (Canberra and Goulburn)

Styles of Stuart Hall
- Reference style: The Most Reverend
- Spoken style: Your Excellency
- Religious style: Bishop

Stuart Russell Hall (born 21 August 1962) is an Australian Catholic Bishop and the incumbent Bishop of the Australian Military Ordinariate, since his term's commencement on 29 August 2026. He previously served in the Royal Australian Navy for 25 years, 22 years as a Navy Chaplain.

== Early life ==
Hall was born in Melbourne, Victoria on 21 August 1962, one of six children to Donald and Pamela Hall. He attended De La Salle College, Malvern, graduating in 1980. He pursued studies for the priesthood at Corpus Christi College in Clayton and obtained a Bachelor of Theology degree from Catholic Theological College in Melbourne.

== Priesthood ==
On 19 September 1987, Hall was ordained to the priesthood at St Patrick's Cathedral, Melbourne by Archbishop Thomas Francis Little. He was ordained alongside Anthony Ireland, who would become Archbishop of Hobart.

In his early years of priestly ministry, he served as assistant priest at Hastings, Essendon, Frankston and Preston.

In 1991, Hall commenced service with the Royal Australian Navy as a reservist chaplain, transferring to the permanent force in 1994. He served all around Australia as a chaplain, including in Western Australia, Cairns, Sydney and Melbourne. He was also deployed overseas, to the Persian Gulf in the early 2000s, and to East Timor twice. In 2005, he became Fleet Command Chaplain, and in 2011 was appointed Director General of Navy Chaplains, a position overseeing Navy Chaplains across Australia from several different faith traditions. In 2011, he was created a Prelate of Honour by Pope Benedict XVI and given the title of Monsignor.

In 2016, he was appointed Parish Priest of East Malvern. He served there until 2022, when he was appointed Dean of St Patrick's Cathedral, Melbourne.

== Episcopate ==
On 3 July 2026, Pope Leo XIV appointed Hall as Bishop of the Catholic Diocese of the Australian Military Services, known as the Military Ordinariate. The Ordinariate had been without a permanent ordinary since the retirement of Bishop Max Leroy Davis in May 2021.

He was consecrated a bishop on 29 August 2026 at St Patrick's Cathedral, Melbourne by Archbishop Peter Comensoli of Melbourne as principal consecrator, with Archbishop Anthony Fisher of Sydney, and Archbishop Christopher Prowse of Canberra and Goulburn and apostolic administrator of the Australian Military Ordinariate serving as principal co-consecrators.

== Personal life ==
Hall is a supporter of Australian rules football team Richmond Football Club, who compete in the Australian Football League. He has cited Saint John Vianney as an inspirational figure for his priestly life.
