= John Joseph Lonergan =

Australian Catholic priest (1888–1938)

Reverend John Joseph Lonergan
- Bishop-Elect of Diocese of Port Augusta
- Diocese: Port Augusta

Orders
- Ordination: 30 November 1911; St Mary's Cathedral, Sydney by Michael Kelly

Personal details
- Born: John Joseph Lonergan; 22 March 1888 South Melbourne, Victoria, Australia
- Died: 14 July 1938 (aged 50) Melbourne, Victoria, Australia
- Buried: Melbourne, Victoria, Australia
- Denomination: Catholic Church
- Occupation: Catholic priest

John Joseph Lonergan (22 March 1888 – 14 July 1938) was an Australian priest of the Catholic Church. He was elected Bishop of Port Augusta in 1938 but died before he could take office.

== Early life ==
Lonergan was born in Melbourne to Michael and Norah Lonergan. He received his education at St Patrick's College, East Melbourne before beginning priestly studies at St Patrick's Seminary, Manly.

== Priesthood ==
Lonergan was ordained on 30 November 1911 at St Mary's Cathedral, Sydney by Archbishop Michael Kelly.

His first appointment as priest was as assistant priest at St Patrick's Cathedral, Melbourne. In 1916, he was appointed inspector of schools for the Archdiocese of Melbourne. In 1924, he was appointed administrator of St Patrick's Cathedral, Melbourne, private secretary to Archbishop Daniel Mannix and chancellor to the Archdiocese of Melbourne.

In 1929, he was given the title of Monsignor and appointed a Domestic Prelate to the Pope.

== Bishop-Elect of Port Augusta ==
On 8 January 1938, Lonergan was appointed Bishop of Port Augusta, to succeed Norman Thomas Gilroy who had been appointed Coadjutor Archbishop of Sydney.

His episcopal consecration had been fixed for 24 April 1938 at St Patrick's Cathedral, Melbourne but had to be postponed due to Lonergan's ill health after he contracted double pneumonia.

== Death ==
Lonergan died at a private hospital in Melbourne on 14 July 1938 following five months of illness and having never taken up his appointment as Bishop of Port Augusta.

His funeral was held on 16 July 1938 at St Patrick's Cathedral, Melbourne, celebrated by Archbishop Daniel Mannix. His body was then taken to Melbourne General Cemetery where he was buried.

Catholic Church titles
Preceded by –	Bishop-Elect of Port Augusta; 1938–1938	Succeeded by –
