= John Patrick O'Loughlin =

The Most Reverend John Patrick O'Loughlin M.S.C.
- Bishop of Diocese of Darwin
- Diocese: Darwin
- Installed: 20 April 1949
- Term ended: 14 November 1985

Orders
- Ordination: 30 November 1935 at St Mary's Cathedral, Sydney by Michael Sheehan
- Consecration: 20 April 1949 at St Francis Xavier's Cathedral, Adelaide by Matthew Beovich

Personal details
- Born: John Patrick O'Loughlin; 25 July 1911 Brompton, South Australia, Australia
- Died: 14 November 1985 (aged 74) Darwin, Northern Territory, Australia
- Buried: St Mary's Star of the Sea Cathedral, Darwin, Northern Territory, Australia
- Denomination: Catholic Church
- Occupation: Catholic bishop
- Motto: Vinculis Dilectionis Trahere ("To draw with the bonds of love")

John Patrick O’Loughlin, M.S.C. (25 July 1911 – 14 November 1985) was the fourth Bishop of the Roman Catholic Diocese of Darwin. He served in the position from 22 May 1949 until his death on 14 November 1985.

== Early life ==
O’Loughlin was born on 25 July 1911 in Adelaide, the son of Michael and Mary O'Loughlin. He grew up in Brompton and attended the local Hindmarsh parish, run by the Missionaries of the Sacred Heart.

He received his primary education from the Sisters of St Joseph of the Sacred Heart at St Joseph's Convent, Brompton and his secondary education from the Congregation of Christian Brothers at Christian Brothers' School, Ovingham and Rostrevor College. In 1929, he entered the novitiate of the Missionaries of the Sacred Heart at Douglas Park. He made his first profession on 26 February 1930 and his solemn profession on 26 February 1933.

On September 1932, O'Loughlin's father passed away. A few weeks later, he was sent to Rome to complete his studies for the priesthood. After two years of study in Rome, he returned to Sacred Heart Monastery, Kensington due to poor health, and completed his studies in Sydney.

== Priesthood ==
On 30 November 1935, O'Loughlin was ordained a priest for the Missionaries of the Sacred Heart at St Mary's Cathedral, Sydney by Archbishop Michael Sheehan, Coadjutor Archbishop of Sydney.

In 1936, he was appointed to the teaching staff of Downlands College. In 1938, he became Prefect of Studies at the school. In 1947, he was assigned to the mission fields of Papua New Guinea, becoming director of Catholic education in the territory of Rabaul. While in Papua New Guinea, he assisted the local bishop in reorganising the region following the devastation of World War II.

== Episcopate ==
On 13 January 1949, O'Loughlin was appointed Bishop of Darwin by Pope Pius XII. He was consecrated bishop on 20 April 1949 at St Francis Xavier's Cathedral, Adelaide by Archbishop Matthew Beovich. Following his consecration, he became the first native of Adelaide to be raised to the episcopate.

He attended all four sessions of the Second Vatican Council between 1962 and 1965.

During his time as Bishop of Darwin, he played a major role in expanding the presence of the Church in the Northern Territory. He established parishes in Tennant Creek, Katherine, Nightcliff, Nhulunbuy, Casuarina, Jabiru and Sanderson. He also led the construction of St Mary's Star of the Sea Cathedral, Darwin. He was also committed to expanding the presence of Catholic education, opening schools in Daly River, Fannie Bay, Nightcliff, Darwin, Casuarina, Sanderson and Alice Springs.

== Death and legacy ==
On 14 November 1985, O'Loughlin died at the age of 74 while still in office. He had served as Bishop of Darwin for 37 years. He was buried in the crypt of St Mary's Star of the Sea Cathedral, Darwin.

O'Loughlin Street, Durack, Northern Territory was named after him in December 2014. O’Loughlin Catholic College at Sanderson is also named after him.
