= Brian Edwin Ferme =

Australian Roman Catholic prelate

Monsignor Brian Edwin Charles Butterley Ferme (born 24 April 1955 in Port Pirie, South Australia) is an Australian Roman Catholic priest and canon lawyer who currently serves in the Roman Curia as Secretary of the Vatican Council of the Economy and as a Protonotary Apostolic.

== Early life and education ==
Brian Edwin Ferme was born in 1955 in Port Pirie, South Australia, the second child of Edwin (Ted) Ronald Butterley Ferme and May Cecilia Butterley Ferme, he is brother to John Ferme and Pauline Ferme. The Ferme family, of distant Scottish origin, migrated to South Australia after an aborted attempt to settle in New Zealand in the mid-nineteenth century.

Brian Ferme was educated at Salesian College in Port Pirie. He obtained his B.A. from Monash University, Melbourne and also studied at the Catholic Theological College, Melbourne. He was ordained on 2 February 1980 as a priest of the Salesians of Saint John Bosco by Port Pirie's bishop Bryan Gallagher.

Brian Ferme was sent by the Salesians to complete a licentiate in canon law at the Salesian Pontifical University, Rome, with initial further studies at the University of Oxford. These studies were interrupted by a return to the Salesian provincial headquarters in Ascot Vale, Melbourne. He returned to Oxford in 1987 to complete a D.Phil in Medieval History on the Provinciale of William Lyndwood, during which period he also served as assistant chaplain at the Oxford University Catholic Chaplaincy. In 1996 he was invited to deliver the inaugural Lyndwood lecture by the Canon Law Society of Great Britain and Ireland. On receiving his doctorate he left the Salesian Order and in January 1993 was incardinated into the Roman Catholic Diocese of Portsmouth, England, though he did not serve there. This incardination at Portsmouth has repeatedly, but incorrectly, led to him being referred to as an English priest.

== Ecclesiastical career ==
Brian Ferme served for a brief period as bursar of Campion Hall before returning to Rome to teach canon law at the Pontifical Gregorian University and in 1994 he was named a Monsignor. He was named dean of the canon law faculty of the Pontifical Lateran University in 2000 and three years later he was appointed Dean of the School of Canon law at the Catholic University of America in Washington D.C. During this role, he was called upon for his opinion on the excommunication of Archbishop Emmanuel Milingo of Lusaka, Zambia for an unauthorised ordination of four married men as bishops at a Washington church. In September 2007, Cardinal Angelo Scola, the Patriarch of Venice, appointed Monsignor Ferme as Rector of the new Studium Generale Marcianum which includes presidency of the Marcianum's San Pio X Institute of Canon Law. Scola also appointed him a canon of St Mark's Basilica. Whilst rector he welcomed, amongst others, Pope Benedict XVI to the Marcianum. On 24 July 2013, the new Patriarch of Venice, Francesco Moraglia, gave Monsignor Ferme the official designation of Monsignor for the University and Culture of Venice.

On 22 March 2014 Monsignor Ferme was appointed Secretary of the Council of the Economy (Consilium de Rebus Oeconomicis) by the Holy See, a position he continues to hold. The Council of the Economy, under the directorship of Cardinal Reinhard Marx, determines the policies of the Vatican's Secretariat of the Economy, headed between 2014 and 2019 by Monsignor Ferme's fellow Australian, former Cardinal George Pell. On 8 November 2022, Pope Francis appointed Brian Ferme to the College of Protonotaries Apostolic de numero participantium.

== Publications ==
Monsignor Brian Ferme is the author of several publications, all in the field of Canon Law:

- "Testamentary procedure with special reference to the executrix"

Archer, Rowena E. • Ferme, Brian Edwin. (1989) - In: Reading medieval studies vol. 15 (1989) pp. 3–34. Also published as:

- "Testamentary Procedure with Special Reference to the Executrix".

Archer, Rowena E. • Ferme, Brian Edwin. (1989) - In: Medieval women in Southern England pp. 3–34.

- Canon law in late medieval England: A study of William Lynwood's Provinciale with particular reference to testamentary Law.

Ferme, Brian Edwin. - Roma (1996).

- Introduzione allo studio delle fonti dell'utrumque ius.

Falchi, Gian Luigi • Ferme, Brian Edwin. - Città del Vaticano (2006).

- Introduction to the History of the Sources of Canon Law: The Ancient Law up to the Decretum of Gratian.

Ferme, Brian Edwin. - Montréal (2007).

- "Dal Decretum Gratiani al Lateranense IV: origine dell'obbligo della confessione".

Ferme, Brian Edwin. (2013) - In: La penitenza tra Gregorio VII e Bonifacio VIII. Teologia - pastorale - istituzioni pp. 127–156.

- "The Roman Primacy and the Canonical Collections of the First Millennium".

Ferme, Brian Edwin. (2013) - In: Studi Agostino Marchetto pp. 137–164.

- "Quinque compilationes antiquae: a turning point in the history of canon law".

Ferme, Brian Edwin. (2005) - In: Miscellanea Velasio De Paolis pp. 41–55.

- "Chiesa e papato nella storia e nel diritto".

Ferme, Brian Edwin. (2004) - In: Apollinaris vol. 77 (2004) pp. 887–891.

- "The magisterium and the medieval canonists".

Ferme, Brian Edwin. (2002) - In: Miscellanea Ottorino Pasquato pp. 397–408.

- "The tendency to Roman law in English fifteenth century law: Lyndwood's Provinciale re-examined".

Ferme, Brian Edwin. (1997) - In: Proceedings of the Ninth International Congress of Medieval Canon Law Munich pp. 661–674.
