= John Henry Norton =

- Bishop of Port Augusta
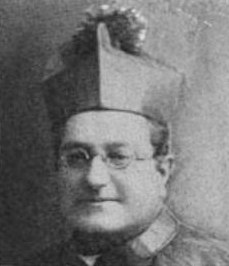
- Bishop Norton in 1917
- Church: Catholic Church
- Diocese: Diocese of Port Augusta
- In office: 18 August 1906 – 22 March 1923
- Predecessor: James Maher
- Successor: Andrew Killian

Orders
- Ordination: 8 April 1882 by Raffaele Monaco La Valletta
- Consecration: 9 December 1906 by Michael Kelly

Personal details
- Born: 31 December 1855 Ballarat, Colony of Victoria, British Empire
- Died: 22 March 1923 (aged 67) Peterborough, South Australia, Australia, British Empire

John Henry Norton (31 December 1855 − 22 March 1923) was an Australian Roman Catholic bishop.

== Biography ==
John Henry Norton was born in Ballarat, Victoria, on 31 December 1855.

Ordained to the priesthood on 8 April 1882, Norton was named bishop of the Roman Catholic Diocese of Port Augusta, South Australia, in 1906. He worked assiduously to develop his far-flung diocese.

He died at his home in Peterborough on 22 March 1923, while still in office.
