= Geoffrey Mayne =

Most Reverend Geoffrey Mayne AM DD
- Bishop of the Australian Defence Force
- See: Military Ordinariate of Australia
- Installed: 27 February 1985
- Term ended: 15 July 2003
- Predecessor: John Aloysius Morgan
- Successor: Max Leroy Davis
- Other post: Titular Bishop of Mopta

Orders
- Ordination: 21 July 1956
- Consecration: 27 February 1985

Personal details
- Born: 27 August 1928
- Died: 14 September 2003 (aged 75) Canberra, ACT
- Denomination: Roman Catholic

Geoffrey Francis Mayne (27 August 1928 – 14 September 2003) was the Catholic Bishop of the Australian Defence Force from 27 February 1985 until 15 July 2003.

== Early life ==
Mayne was born in Kensington on 27 August 1928, at St Ronan's Private Hospital to Francis Xavier and Vera May Mayne. He attended St Aidan's Catholic Primary School, Maroubra before moving to Waverley College. He later attended Sydney University and studied pharmacy, briefly working as a pharmacist before beginning studies for the priesthood at St Patrick's Seminary, Manly.

== Priesthood ==
Mayne was ordained a priest on 21 July 1956 for the Archdiocese of Sydney by Cardinal Norman Thomas Gilroy at St Mary's Cathedral, Sydney.

In 1965, he joined the Royal Australian Navy an served as a chaplain until 1983. He served both onshore and offshore, even seeing active service overseas. He founded the Monsignor's Cup for Rugby Union. He served as Fleet Chaplain from 1972 to 1974 and Naval Support Command Chaplain from 1972 to 1982. He was promoted to Principal Chaplain in 1977 and was given the title of Monsignor in 1979, being honoured as a Prelate of Honour of His Holiness. He was appointed to the Department of Defence (Australia) in 1982. He retired from full time serve and transferred to the reserve list in 1983, when he was appointed parish priest of Mosman.

== Episcopacy ==
On 2 January 1985, Mayne was appointed Military Vicar of Australia. His episcopal consecration taking place on 27 February 1985 at St Christopher's Cathedral, Manuka at the hands of Archbishop Francis Roberts Rush.

On 21 July 1986, the Apostolic Constitution “Spirituali Militum Curae” was published, establishing Military Ordinariates to provide dedicated spiritual care and pastoral assistance to military personnel, their families, and support staff, functioning essentially like a worldwide, non-geographic diocese. Mayne drew up the statutes of the new military ordinariate and submitted them to the Congregation for Bishops in June 1987. Final approval was granted on 1 June 1988 and on 1 November 1988, it was promulgated and became effective, formally elevating the Vicariate to a Military Ordinariate. Following this, Mayne made the decision to incardinate priests into the Ordinariate. He also consulted with chaplains and four Service Officers were accepted, trained and ordained to the Permanent Diaconate.

Following the 2003 invasion of Iraq, Mayne wrote a pastoral letter to the members of the Australian Defence Forces. "We know you well and deem it a great privilege to serve you and your families as best we can and as circumstances allow. We are proud of you as you join in the active endeavour to combat and overcome injustice and terrorism," he wrote. "We pray earnestly for your success and that you will help to achieve lasting peace for our troubled times."

== Retirement and death ==
On 16 July 2003, Mayne retired as Bishop of the Military Ordinariate of Australia due to ill health, a few weeks shy of his 75th birthday. He was able to consecrate his successor, Bishop Max Leroy Davis, on 22 August 2003, just weeks before his death.

He died on 14 September 2003. His funeral Mass was celebrated on 24 September 2003 at St Christopher's Cathedral, Manuka.

Preceded by John Aloysius Morgan	Second Military Vicar of Australia; 27 February 1985 – 21 July 1986	Succeeded by Max Leroy Davis
Preceded by John Aloysius Morgan	First Military Ordinary of Australia; 21 July 1986 – 16 July 2003	Succeeded by Max Leroy Davis
