= Charles Gauci =

Australian Catholic bishop (born 1952)

The Most Reverend Charles Gauci
- Bishop of Darwin
- Church: Roman Catholic Church
- Diocese: Darwin
- See: Darwin
- Appointed: 27 June 2018
- Predecessor: Daniel Eugene Hurley

Orders
- Ordination: 10 December 1977
- Consecration: 26 September 2018 by Daniel Eugene Hurley

Personal details
- Born: Charles Victor Emmanuel Gauci; 31 March 1952 (age 74) Floriana, Malta
- Coat of arms

Charles Gauci (born 1952) is an Australian priest who was appointed Bishop of the Roman Catholic Diocese of Darwin on 27 June 2018. He had been a priest in the Archdiocese of Adelaide since his ordination in 1977.

== Early life ==
Gauci was born in Floriana, Malta, on 13 March 1952, the first of six children born to John and Violet Gauci. He came from a devout family, with his father's two sisters joining the Franciscans and his father's younger brother serving as a priest on the Jesuit mission in India since 1957. His father had joined a religious order and was studying for the priesthood, but left when he met his future wife.

His maternal grandparents had already migrated to Australia before his birth. The family followed, uncertain of what the economic future of Malta would be following independence, and in 1965, he migrated with his family to Australia, turning 13 on the day their ship crossed the equator on its voyage. The family arrived in Melbourne and went straight to Adelaide, where they moved in with his maternal grandparents in Hindmarsh. His younger brother John died just a few months after arriving at the age of four after contracting pneumonia following a heart operation.

In Australia, he completed his secondary education at a variety of government and Marist Brothers' schools. He attended Findon High School, Findon, due to his family being unable to afford the fees for the local Catholic school. He later moved to Marist Brothers High School, Thebarton after they agreed to adjust their fees. He moved back to Findon High School to complete year 12, however.

While he had discerned becoming a priest when he was young, during his schooling years, he considered becoming a teacher instead and was accepted into a teachers' college. Not long after leaving high school, he discerned a vocation to the priesthood and in 1971, entered the St Francis Xavier Seminary, Adelaide to study to be a priest for the Archdiocese of Adelaide.

== Priesthood ==
Gauci was ordained a priest for the Archdiocese of Adelaide on 10 December 1977 at St Francis Xavier's Cathedral, Adelaide by Archbishop James William Gleeson.

His first appointment was in January 1978, when he was appointed assistant priest of Hectorville. In 1983, he moved to Woodville and in 1985, to Elizabeth North. In 1987, he was moved to Elizabeth, where he served for 11 years. In 1998, he was appointed to Noarlunga Seaford Parish. In 2001, he also took on responsibility for Willunga, Kangaroo Island and Victor Harbor. As a priest, he served in a variety of other roles, notably as a member of the diocesan College of Consultors, member and President of the Council of Priests, member of the appointments board, Chaplain to the council for youth and young adults, and as a dean.

In February 2017, he was appointed Administrator of St Francis Xavier's Cathedral, Adelaide.

One of the biggest influences on Gauci's priestly life was the Society of Christian Doctrine, founded by Saint George Preca. It's a society of Catholic lay volunteers, made of men and women, teaching catechism in the Christian faith formation of children and adults. He first encountered the group as a boy in Malta and was enrolled into the society in 1970 just before entering seminary. He was also its national chaplain in Australia.

== Episcopate ==
On 27 June 2018, Gauci was appointed Bishop of Darwin by Pope Francis. He replaced Bishop Daniel Eugene Hurley, who had served a Bishop of Darwin for 11 years and, at 75, was three years past the canonical retirement age of 75.

He was consecrated bishop at St Mary's Star of the Sea Cathedral, Darwin on 26 September 2018 by his predecessor, Bishop Daniel Eugene Hurley. He became the first Adelaide Diocesan priest to be ordained a bishop since Philip Kennedy was ordained a bishop in 1973.

He spent his first year after his consecration traveling around the vast Diocese, going to every parish and meeting with every priest. He also handed over some parts of Church-owned land to the local communities of Aboriginal people, to provide local employment and work opportunities.

In 2025, he campaigned against the introduction of assisted dying in the Northern Territory, saying the government should focus instead on providing the “best possible palliative care” to its residents.

Catholic Church titles
Preceded by Eugene Hurley	Bishop of Darwin; 2018–present	Incumbent
