= Karol Kulczycki =

The Most Reverend Karol Kulczycki SDS
- Bishop of Port Pirie
- Church: Catholic Church
- Province: Adelaide
- Appointed: 1 August 2020

Orders
- Ordination: 28 May 1994 by Franciszek Macharski
- Consecration: 29 September 2020 by Adolfo Tito Yllana

Personal details
- Born: 19 October 1966 (age 60) Góra, Poland
- Denomination: Roman Catholicism
- Motto: In Te, Domine, Speravi ("In thee I have trusted, Lord")
- Coat of arms: Karol Kulczycki's coat of arms

Ordination history of Karol Kulczycki
History
Episcopal consecration
- Principal consecrator: Adolfo Tito Yllana
- Co-consecrators: Marek Jędraszewski, Jacek Kiciński

Styles of Karol Kulczycki
- Reference style: His Excellency; The Most Reverend
- Spoken style: Your Excellency
- Religious style: Bishop

Karol Kulczycki, SDS (born 19 October 1966) is a Polish-born Australian bishop of the Catholic Church and a member of the Society of the Divine Savior. He is the bishop of the Diocese of Port Pirie, appointed to the position in 2020. He was first transferred to Australia in 1997, before returning to his home country in 2018. He has since been back to Australia numerous times as of 2026.

== Early life ==
Kulczycki was born in Góra, Poland, on 19 October 1966. During his youth, he lived in Czernina. He joined the Society of the Divine Savior in 1987 and made his solemn vows in 1992. On 28 May 1994, Kulczycki was ordained a priest in Poland by Cardinal Franciszek Macharski.

== Presbyteral ministry ==
After ordination, Kulczycki's first assignment was at the Society's vocational office in his home country. After three years there, he was sent to work in Australia as a chaplain, parochial vicar, and pastor. He subsequently became provincial superior of the Salvatorians in Australia in 2010. He returned to Poland in 2018 to serve as Vice Provincial.

== Episcopal ministry ==
Kulczycki was appointed Bishop of Port Pirie on 1 August 2020. He was ordained bishop by Archbishop Adolfo Tito Yllana, Apostolic Nuncio to Australia on 29 September 2020 in Trzebinia, Poland, and was installed in St Mark's Cathedral in Port Pirie on 28 October 2020.

Catholic Church titles
| Preceded by Gregory O'Kelly | Bishop of Port Pirie; 2020–present | Incumbent |
