= Jack Bedson =

Australian writer

- Born: John William Bedson; 5 March 1950 (age 76); Redfern, Sydney, New South Wales, Australia
- Education: Bachelor of Arts (First Class Honours), University of New South Wales; Diploma of Librarianship
- Occupations: Writer, poet, children's picture book author, librarian
- Years active: 1980s–present
- Employer: University of New England
- Known for: Australian children's picture books; academic librarianship
- Notable work: Don't Get Burnt (1985); Sheep Dogs (1990)
- Partner: Margaret Anne Bain
- Children: 1

John William "Jack" Bedson (born 5 March 1950) is an Australian writer, poet, children's picture book author, and former university librarian.

== Early life and education ==
Bedson was born in the Sydney suburb of Redfern and raised in Sydney's inner suburbs. His father William John Alexander Bedson, a metal moulder, grew up in Caroline St., Redfern, on the famous 'Block'. His mother, Lucy Clymer, suffered as a victim of the White Stolen Generations twice, firstly as a child removed from her father and fostered out without schooling, then placed in the Watt St. Mental Hospital, Newcastle, for nine years from the ages of nine to eighteen; secondly, as a young unmarried woman whose baby was given to foster parents by St Anthony's Home for Unmarried Mothers, Croydon.

He went to preschool at Blackfriar's School in Chippendale, and primary school at St Benedict's Broadway. He characterises growing up in Sydney's 'slum' suburbs: "Our feet were like leather and we knew little fear ... Bullying, cheating, stealing, lying, wagging school ... wandering miles never lost, killing cats, begging from strangers, and talking to dirty old men. If inner Sydney street life in the 1950s was underprivileged, we didn't know it." His secondary schooling was at De La Salle College, Marrickville. He worked briefly as a stage hand at TCN9 Willoughby when television in Australia was in black and white, and was accepted to the National Institute of Dramatic Art production course but declined NIDA in favour of an Arts degree at the University of New South Wales, graduating with First Class Honours in 1973 then completing a Diploma in Librarianship in 1974.

== Early career and personal life ==
Bedson pursued librarianship in Burnie, Tasmania in the State Library of Tasmania system. In Burnie he also qualified as a ticketwriter, and began publishing poetry. He travelled for three years in Asia and Europe with his partner Margaret Anne Bain before returning to settle in Armidale, New South Wales where he worked at the library of the University of New England. He has one son, Remy, with Margaret Bain.

== Professional and creative life ==
Bedson's professional involvements ranged from literary bibliography to Library disaster management and preservation. He acted as University Librarian of the University of New England in 2000 and 2007–9.

His best-selling children's picture books Don't Get Burnt and SheepDogs, illustrated by Peter Gouldthorpe, are classic Australian tales of the city and the bush. His adult poetry is salted with aphorisms, as in Karma, Sorta:

Youth's the Perfect Crime,
Adulthood the Perfect Punishment

== Select bibliography ==
- Don't Get Burnt, or, The Great Australian Day at the Beach illustrated by Peter Gouldthorpe (Collins, 1985)
- Don't get burnt or, the great Australian day at the beach [sound recording (Royal Blind Society, 1989)
- The Contents of Their Wallet edited with Anthony J Bennett (Kardoorair, 1987)
- Sleep no more; poems of Jack Bedson (Kardoorair, 1993)
- The Campbell Howard Annotated Index of Australian Plays 1920-1955 compiled and edited with Julian Croft (Centre for Australian Language and Literature Studies (CALLS), 1993)
- Sheep Dogs illustrated by Peter Gouldthorpe (Walter McVitty, 1990) (Puffin, 1995)
- Nojyo ha Osawagi (Walter McVitty, 1990) illustrated by Peter Gouldthorpe

A fuller bibliography is available at AustLit and the National Library of Australia database Trove
