= St Francis Xavier Seminary, Adelaide =

Former Catholic major seminary in Australia

St Francis Xavier Seminary
- Location: 36 Chapel Way, Rostrevor, South Australia, Australia
- Coordinates: 34°53′58″S 138°41′24″E
- Motto: Propter Deum
- Motto in English: For the sake of God
- Founders: Archbishop Matthew Beovich
- Established: 1 February 1942
- Named for: St Francis Xavier
- Status: Closed (2001)
- Gender: Male only

Map
- Location within inner Adelaide

St Francis Xavier Seminary was the seminary of the Roman Catholic Archdiocese of Adelaide which operated from 1942 to 2001.

== History ==
The creation of St Francis Xavier Seminary was announced on 4 July 1940. Archbishop Matthew Beovich said the Holy Father had requested a minor seminary be built in South Australia to aid in vocations to the Diocesan priesthood in the state. In December 1941, Fr Alan Edward Norbert Johnston, a priest of the Archdiocese of Perth was announced as the inaugural rector of the seminary.

On 1 February 1942, the seminary was inaugurated, with 25 students (19 for the Archdiocese of Adelaide and 6 for the Diocese of Port Augusta) beginning studies.

Initially, the seminary was aimed at young men who had yet to complete their secondary studies. In 1944, it was announced it would become a major seminary too, offering courses in philosophy. Students were still required to complete their studies at St Patrick's Seminary, Manly

By the end of 1949, the seminary boasted 38 students, with 20 studying philosophy. On 1 January 1950, Fr Leonard Faulkner became the first student from the seminary to be raised to the priesthood. He was ordained in Rome where he had completed his theological training.

In December 1951, Archbishop Beovich invited the Congregation of the Mission to take charge of the seminary, in order to free up Diocesan priests for parish duties.

When St Charles Seminary in Western Australia closed in 1975, students for the priesthood for the dioceses of Perth, Geraldton, Bunbury and Broome were sent to study at St Francis Xavier Seminary.

In November 1990, the seminary had 26 students in training for the priesthood for South Australia and Western Australia. The seminary experienced a share decline in the number of vocations during the 1990s however and in 1999, not a single new entrance for the diocesan priesthood came forward, leading to calls for change.

== Closure ==
In October 1994, plans for a multidenominational Christian college for about 200 students was announced, to be established in Adelaide. The college would combine the Uniting Church's Parkin-Wesley College, Wayville, the Anglican St Barnabas' Theological College, Belair, and St Francis Xavier Seminary, Rostrevor. The move was delayed however due to difficulties setting up the college and selling the previous sites.

The Rostrevor site was vacated completely in 1998 and students moved to a new resident in Morphettville. The solution was short-lived however and in 2001, Adelaide's Archbishop Leonard Faulkner and Port Pirie's Bishop Eugene Hurley penned a joint letter announced the Morphettville seminary would not house any seminarians in the next year. The bishops said, with just two men in formation (one was in his final year of study), it was "an insufficient number to constitute a workable formation community". The seminary was closed and students for the priesthood for Adelaide were sent to the Seminary of the Good Shepherd, Sydney.

== Notable alumni ==
- Leonard Faulkner
- Donald Sproxton
- Michael Morrissey
- James Gleeson

== See also ==
- Roman Catholic Church in Australia
