= Julian Croft =

Australian poet and academic

Emeritus Professor Julian Croft BA (NSW) MA (Newcastle)
- Born: Julian Charles Basset Croft; 31 May 1941 (age 85); Merewether, New South Wales
- Citizenship: Australian
- Education: Newcastle Boys High School; University of New South Wales (BA); University of Newcastle (MA)
- Occupation: academic
- Writing career
- Language: English
- Genres: biographer, anthologist and editor, poet, novelist, lyricist

Julian Croft (born 31 May 1941) is an Australian poet and Emeritus Professor of English, University of New England. He was a founder of the Association for the Study of Australian Literature and co-edited its journal, Notes and Furphies for many years. In addition to gathering prizes for his published poems, he is known for his studies of his teacher, T. Harri Jones and Joseph Furphy (Tom Collins).

== Early life and education ==
Julian Charles Basset Croft was born 31 May 1941 in Merewether, a beachside suburb of Newcastle, New South Wales, the son of Jack Croft and his wife Florence Helena née Champion.

Croft was educated at Newcastle Boys' High School.

Croft was graduated Bachelor of Arts by the University of New South Wales in 1961.

From 1961 until 1962 he worked for the Australian Commonwealth Film Unit as a production assistant.

Between 1964 and 1967, he was a research assistant at the University of Newcastle and on 15 March 1968, he was graduated Master of Arts by the University of Newcastle after he had submitted his dissertation, "The concepts of time, history, and memory in the poetry of Kenneth Slessor and R.D. Fitzgerald" to the Department of English. His researches resulted in T.H.Jones (Writers of Wales, 1976), The Collected Poems of T. Harri Jones (1977, with Don Dale-Jones) and Robert D. Fitzgerald (1987, UQP Australian Authors Series).

In 1967, he married Loretta Ruth Amelia De Plevitz. His first novel, Their Solitary Way (1985), tells the story of the failure of this marriage with separate versions "emphasising the innate incompatibilities of the two". The marriage was dissolved in 1978.

== Sierra Leone ==
On completion of his master's degree, he travelled in Europe and Africa. From 1968 to 1970, he was a lecturer at Fourah Bay College (then part of the University of Sierra Leone) in Freetown, Sierra Leone living on campus

"600 feet above a city which never slept. All night you could hear drums and singing, dogs barking and people calling. The sounds of wakes, weddings and births all drifted in through the window at night. And then at 0600, the sun would rise on Mount Aureol and there was Africa – not lions and giraffes – but the real Africa, a city and people, all before you. If you love Africa, you love life."

== University of New England ==
In 1970, he returned to Australia and took up a lectureship at the University of New England (Armidale, NSW, Australia). He was promoted to senior lecturer in 1975 and associate professor in 1992. He was elected to a chair in 1994 when he became professor of English and communication studies, a position he held until his retirement in 2001. He was then granted the honour of Emeritus Professor in the School of English, Communication and Theatre, University of New England.

== Association for the Study of Australian Literature ==
In 1978 he was a foundational member of the executive committee of the Association for the Study of Australian Literature. When he left the committee in 1989, he was made a life member of the Association.

== Awards and honours ==
- Commonwealth Poetry Prize, Special Prize for a First Collection, 1985: regional winner for Breakfasts in Shanghai
- Mattara Poetry Prize, 1985: joint second for The West Wind

Croft's study of the Australian novelist Joseph Furphy won the McCrae Russell prize in 1991.

- ASAL (Association for the Study of Australian Literature) Walter McRae Russell Award, 1992: winner for The Life and Opinions of Tom Collins : A Study of the Works of Joseph Furphy
- The Newcastle Poetry Prize, Open, 2008: Highly commended for The Shed

== Personal and family life ==
Croft has one son from his first marriage and another son from his marriage on 12 December 1987 to Caroline Margaret, daughter of Robert Ruming and Kay McCumstie.

Croft has resided in Armidale, New South Wales since the 1970s. He is a motoring enthusiast and lists his membership of the Bristol Owners' Club (Australia).

== Select bibliography ==
- T.H.Jones (Writers of Wales) (1976)
- The Collected Poems of T. Harri Jones (1977, with Don Dale-Jones)
- Loose Federation: Poems (1979, collected poems; with Michael Sharkey)
- "R D FitzGerald's 'The Face of the Waters'" (1979) Australian Literary Studies Vol. 9 (1) pp 71–76
- Beware, Soul Brother and the Nigerian civil war (1980)
- Around the Traps (May 1982) (1982, collected poems)
- Breakfast in Shanghai (1984, collected poems)
- Their Solitary Way (1985, novel)
- Eugenia Falleni (1986, music drama)
- "Poetry of the nineteen thirties" (1986) Westerly Vol. 31 (4) pp 84–93
- "Between Hay and Booligal: Tom Collins' land and Joseph Furphy's landscape" (book chapter) in Mapped, But Not Known: the Australian Landscape of the Imagination: Essays and Poems Presented to Brian Elliott. (1986) pp 154–170
- The federal and national impulse in Australian literature, 1890-1958 (The Colin Roderick lectures) (1989)
- The Life and Opinions of Tom Collins: A Study of the Works of Joseph Furphy (1991)
- Confessions of a Corinthian: Poems (1991, collected poems)
- The Campbell Howard annotated index of Australian Plays 1920-1955 (1993, ed. with Jack Bedson)
- "I have split the infinitive. Beyond is anything." Ern Malley, "Petit Testiment" professing English communication (and poetry) now (public lecture at the University of New England) (1998)
- "A sense of industrial place: the literature of Newcastle, New South Wales, 1797-1997", (1999)Antipodes (Brooklyn, New York) Vol.13 (1) pp 15–20.
- Poet probed the nation's soul (Obituary: Judith Wright) The Australian 27 June 2000 p 14
- After a war (any war): poems (2002, collected poems)
- "Such Is/Was Life", in Unemployed at last! Essays on Australian Literature to 2002, for Julian Croft (2003) Edited by Ken Stewart and Shirley Walker, pp. 1–17.
- Ocean Island (2006, collected poems)
- Time & Motion: New and Selected Poems (2026)

A more complete bibliography is available at AustLit.
