= John Aloysius Morgan =

Australian prelate

The Most Reverend John Morgan AO, RFD, ED
- Bishop of the Australian Defence Force
- See: Titular bishop of Membressa
- Installed: 28 April 1969
- Term ended: 15 July 2003
- Predecessor: Thomas McCabe
- Successor: Geoffrey Francis Mayne
- Other posts: Military Vicar of the Australian Defence Force; Auxiliary Bishop of Canberra and Goulburn

Orders
- Ordination: 15 July 1934
- Consecration: 28 April 1969

Personal details
- Born: 9 October 1909 Melbourne, Australia
- Died: 21 May 2008 (aged 98) Canberra, Australia

John Aloysius Morgan, AO RFD ED (9 October 1909 – 21 May 2008) was an Australian prelate of the Roman Catholic Church.

== Early life ==
Morgan was born in Keilor on the outskirts of Melbourne, Victoria, where his father Patrick owned and operated a farm. He attended St Columbas Primary School in Essendon before moving on to St Joseph's Christian Brothers College in North Melbourne in 1917 and again from 1920 to 1926, finally completing his secondary schooling at St. Kevins. He and his brother Frank traveled to school each day by horse and buggy. While at school he was considered a very good high jumper and champion handball player and retained a love of sport, and in particular, Australian rules football, throughout his life.

== Religious life ==
He was ordained a priest on 15 July 1934 for the Archdiocese of Melbourne. During the Second World War he served as a Chaplain with the Second Australian Imperial Force in Papua New Guinea from 1942 to 1945. He later recalled that his experiences there were a formative part of his spiritual and personal life. He remained an Army Chaplain until 1981 when he stepped down as the Army's Chaplain General. While in Melbourne he was placed in charge of various parishes including, in 1953, St James' parish in Richmond.

Morgan was appointed auxiliary bishop of the Archdiocese of Canberra and Goulburn as well as Titular Bishop of Membressa on 6 March 1969. He was ordained bishop on 28 April 1969. He was appointed on 29 May 1969 to the Roman Catholic Military Ordinariate of Australia where he would remain until of 2 January 1985, as well as the auxiliary bishop of the Canberra and Goulburn archdiocese.

== Later life ==
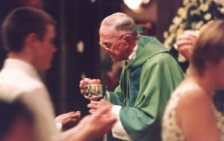
Bishop Morgan, 2003

In 2003 he concelebrated Mass at St Patrick's Cathedral Melbourne to mark the centenary of his old school, St Joseph's CBC North Melbourne. As he had done with the soldiers in New Guinea, he retained strong pastoral feelings for his flock, the residents in the center where he lived, celebrating Mass daily and speaking with them whenever possible.

Morgan held the following honours: Officer of the Order of Australia (1976), Reserve Force Decoration and the Efficiency Decoration. He died on 21 May 2008 aged 98.

== See also ==
- Archdiocese of Canberra and Goulburn
- Archdiocese of Melbourne
- Roman Catholic Military Ordinariate of Australia
