= James Maher (cleric) =

Irish-born Roman Catholic bishop (1840–1905)

- Bishop of Port Augusta
- Church: Catholic Church
- Diocese: Diocese of Port Augusta
- In office: 10 January 1896 – 20 December 1905
- Predecessor: John O'Reily
- Successor: John Henry Norton

Orders
- Ordination: 1868
- Consecration: 26 April 1896 by James Francis Corbett

Personal details
- Born: 12 July 1840 Grangemockler, County Tipperary, United Kingdom of Great Britain and Ireland
- Died: 20 December 1905 (aged 65)

James Maher (12 July 1840 – 20 December 1905) was an Irish-born Roman Catholic priest who served as Bishop of Port Augusta from 1896 until his death in 1905.

James Maher was born in the parish of Granemockler, Co. Tipperary, Ireland on 12 July 1840. He studied classics at Mount Melleray Abbey Grammar School, and philosophy and theology at St. John's College, Waterford. He was ordained priest at Maynooth College in 1868, by Bishop of Sale and arrived in South Australia in December of the same year. Fr Maher served in various roles, at Kadina, Mount Barker, Adelaide, and Kapunda, and was then appointed to Pekina, where he served as parish priest. When the Port Augusta diocese was established and Dr. O'Reily appointed first Bishop in 1888, Father Maher was appointed Vicar-General, and on Dr. O'Reily's translation to the archdiocese of Adelaide, he succeeded him as Bishop of Port Augusta, being consecrated in St. Francis Xavier, Cathedral, Adelaide on 26 April 1896.

He died on 20 December 1905 in his residence in Pekina, and was buried in front of St Catherine's Catholic church. He was succeeded by John Henry Norton, the first Australian-born Bishop of Port Augusta.
