= Casimir Catholic College =

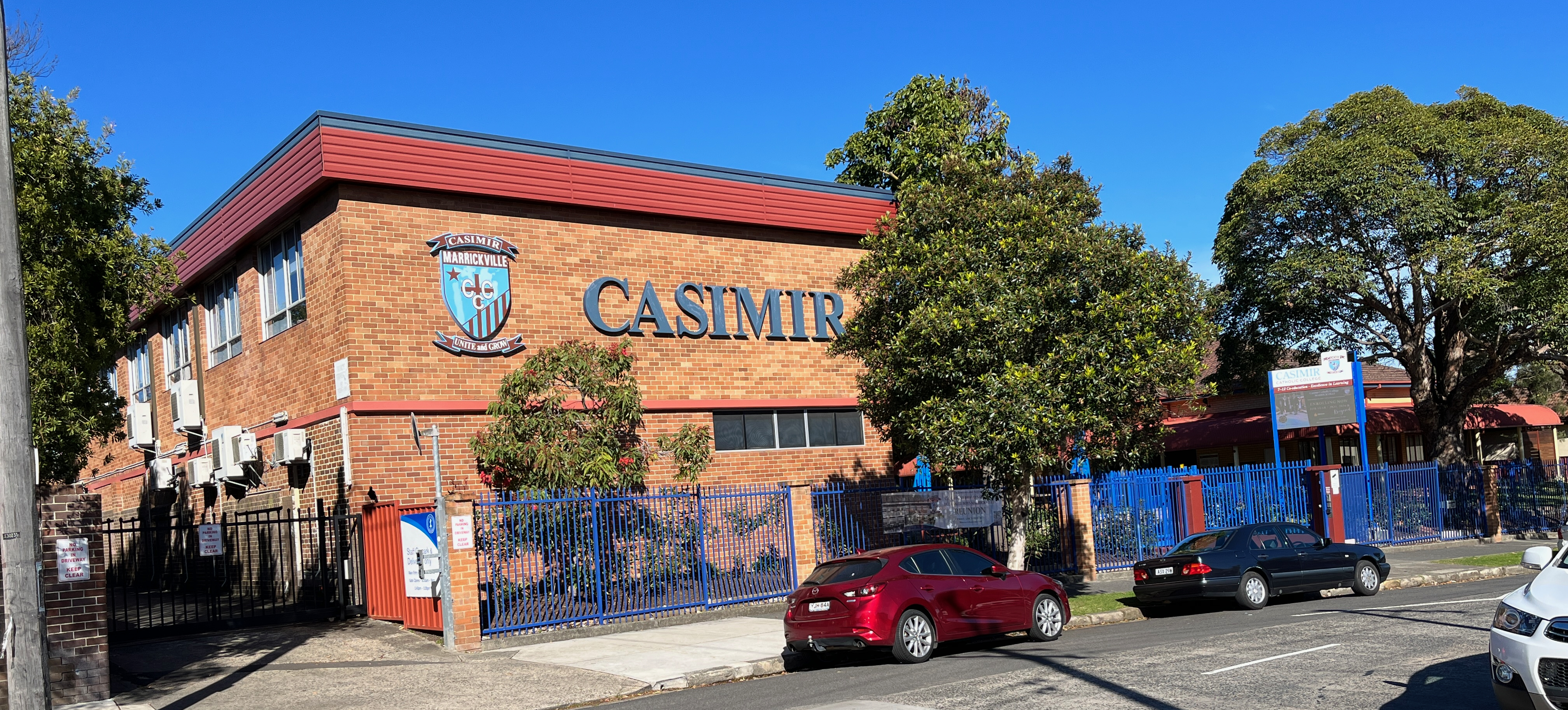
- Casimir Catholic College, June 2023

Location
- Marrickvile, Sydney, New South Wales; Australia; 33°54′39″S 151°09′06″E

Information
- Type: Independent comprehensive co-educational secondary day school
- Motto: Unite and Grow
- Denomination: Roman Catholic
- Established: 1983; 43 years ago
- Oversight: Catholic Education Office of the Archdiocese of Sydney
- Principal: Carmelina Eussen
- Years: 7–12
- Colours: Navy blue and maroon
- School fees: Approximately: $1,700 (Year 7); $2,509 (Year 12)
- Website: casimirmarrickville.syd.catholic.edu.au

Casimir Catholic College is an independent Roman Catholic comprehensive co-educational secondary day school, located in the Sydney suburb of Marrickville, New South Wales, Australia.

== History ==
Casimir catholic college was formed in 1983 from the merger of De La Salle College, a boys' school, and St Brigid's Girls' School, which had existed since the 1921s. The founder of both schools was the parish priest Father Casimir Maguire, and so the amalgamated school took his name.

== Philosophy ==
The college adheres to the values and customs of the three orders involved in its history: the Good Samaritan Sisters, the De La Salle Brothers and the Passionist Fathers.

== Notable alumni ==
- Jack Bedson, a poet and children's author
- Kevin Berry, an Olympic Gold Medalist 200m Butterfly 1964
- James Dibble, an ABC newsreader
- Jeff Fenech, a champion boxer
- Joe Hasham, an actor who played Don Finlayson in Number 96
- Trent Merrin, a rugby league football player, who represented NSW in the State of Origin series

== See also ==
- List of Catholic schools in New South Wales
- Catholic education in Australia
