= Bryan Gallagher =

His Grace Bryan Gallangher
- Church: St Mark's Cathedral
- Diocese: Port Pirie
- Appointed: 13 March 1952
- Retired: 11 August 1980
- Predecessor: Thomas Absolem McCabe
- Successor: Francis Peter de Campo
- Previous post: Parish priest of Three Springs

Orders
- Ordination: 22 December 1934 at Archbasilica of Saint John Lateran, Rome by Francesco Marchetti Selvaggiani
- Consecration: 11 June 1952 at St Francis Xavier's Cathedral, Geraldton by Paolo Marella

Personal details
- Born: Perth, Western Australia
- Died: October 6, 1982 (aged 71) Wallaroo, South Australia
- Denomination: Roman Catholic
- Occupation: Cleric

Bryan Gallagher (21 September 1911 − 6 October 1982) was an Australian Roman Catholic bishop, who served a Bishop of Port Pirie for nearly three decades.

== Early life ==
Gallagher was born in Perth, Western Australia on 21 September 1911, one of four boys born to Charles Stanislaus and Mary Gallagher. He received his education at Christian Brothers' College, Perth and then at St Ildephonsus College, New Norcia.

Immediately after graduating in 1929, he was sent to Rome to continue his studies at the Pontificio Collegio Urbano de Propaganda Fide.

== Priesthood ==
Gallagher was ordained to the priesthood on 22 December 1934 in the Archbasilica of Saint John Lateran by Cardinal Francesco Marchetti Selvaggiani. Following his ordination, he spent some months traveling through England and the Holy Land. He returned to Western Australia in September 1935. Upon his arrival he was appointed assistant at the St Francis Xavier's Cathedral, Geraldton where he relieved Bishop James Patrick O'Collins, who had been the only priest in the city since February.

He was eventually made administrator of the Cathedral, and helped Bishop O'Collins complete the new cathedral, according to the plans of Monsignor John Hawes.

After serving as a priest in Geraldton, Gallagher became the parish priest of Three Springs, succeeding Fr Michael Lynch. There, he bought land across the road from the existing wooden "Mass-barn" where St Paul's School and a Dominican convent were built. He completed the presbytery around 1944-45 for £1200 and opened it free of debt.

Gallagher had intended to build St Paul's Church in Three Springs according to the design of the famous architect Monsignor Hawes. Upon hearing of this, Hawes wrote a letter wherein he praised the planned church as "my prized design" for which he had previously struggled to obtain council approval. However, after Gallagher became the Bishop of Port Pirie in 1952, the new church was instead built according to a different design in 1958.

He also served as Diocesan Secretary, Diocesan Inspector of Schools and Diocesan Organiser for the Propagation of the Faith. In 1951, Gallagher was appointed a Domestic Prelate by Pope Pius XII and given the title of Monsignor.

== Episcopate ==
On 13 March 1952, Gallagher was appointed Bishop of Port Pirie by Pope Pius XII. At the time of the announcement, he was in Europe, enjoying his first protracted break in seventeen years. Just prior to the announcement, he had been received in an audience by Pope Pius XII.

He was liturgically received into his new Diocese on 12 July 1952 at St Mark's Cathedral, Port Pirie. When he arrived in the Diocese, he had no permanent house and had to reside temporarily at Peterborough. One of his first major acts as bishop was to help open the newly restored St Mark's Cathedral after it was destroyed by fire in 1947.

Gallagher participated as a Council Father in all four sessions of the Second Vatican Council.

He was a supporter of minor seminaries, believing vocations should be fostered in young men at an early age. "Although some people do not like the idea of minor seminaries, it is still in the very young years that the idea grows and that should be fostered in some suitable place," he said in 1980.

== Resignation and death ==
Gallagher resigned on 11 August 1980, having been in ill-health for some years and suffering a mild stroke. He had been Bishop of Port Pirie for 28 years.

He died suddenly on 6 October 1982 at his retirement home in Wallaroo. His funeral was held on 12 October 1982 at St Mark's Cathedral, Port Pirie.

== See also ==
- Catholic Church in Australia
