= Catholic Diocese of the Australian Military Services =

Catholic ecclesiastical jurisdiction

Catholic Diocese of the Australian Military Services Catholic Military Ordinariate of Australia

Catholic
- Coat of arms

Location
- Country: Australia
- Metropolitan: Immediately subject to the Holy See

Information
- Denomination: Catholic
- Sui iuris church: Latin Church
- Rite: Roman Rite
- Established: 6 March 1969; 57 years ago
- Patron saint: Mary Help of Christians
- Secular priests: 8, plus 1 religious priest (2023)

Current leadership
- Pope: Leo XIV
- Bishop-Elect: Stuart Hall
- Apostolic Administrator: Christopher Prowse
- Vicar General: Peter O'Keefe
- Bishops emeritus: Max Leroy Davis

Website
- www.military.catholic.org.au

The Catholic Diocese of the Australian Military Services is a Catholic military ordinariate immediately subject to the Holy See. It was established in 1969 and maintains its chancery office in Canberra. It is a diocese in its own right and not governed under any diocese or archdiocese.

Its ordinary (bishop) and his chaplains serve the members of the Australian Defence Force (ADF) and their families in all three services; the Royal Australian Navy (RAN), the Australian Army and the Royal Australian Air Force (RAAF) regardless of location.

== History ==
Catholic chaplaincy has been provided for Australians serving in the military since the 1901 contribution of forces to fight in the Boxer Rebellion. However, it was not until 1912 that a bishop, Thomas Carr, the then Archbishop of Melbourne, was delegated by the Catholic bishops of Australia as the bishop of the Australian Armed Forces.

From 1912 until 1969, Catholic armed servicemen and women were in the care of a bishop delegated to them who was also a bishop elsewhere. In 1969, Pope Paul VI created the military vicariate of Australia. In 1984, Pope John Paul II elevated the vicariate to a military ordinariate with its own bishop. The vicariate was officially established under an apostolic constitution, Spirituali Militum Curae, on 21 July 1986 and given final approval in 1988.

== Structure ==
The headquarters (Chancery) of the Ordinariate (Diocese) is located in Campbell, Australian Capital Territory, while being immediately subject to the Holy See. Unlike conventional dioceses, which are restricted to a geographical area, the Military Ordinariate for the ADF covers all of Australia and its defence bases, and any Australian military facilities or units overseas or off-shore.

=== Bishop ===
The Catholic Military Bishop is the spiritual leader and shepherd of all Catholics in the ADF and their families, and they canonically come under his ecclesial jurisdiction including for such things as the Sacraments of Baptism, Confirmation, Marriage, etc. The Catholic Church and its military bishop are recognised as the authority representing Catholics in the ADF by the Defence Regulation Act 2016 (superseding the Defence Act 1903 and the former Defence Instructions - General, Navy (DI-N), Army and Air Force).

The following individuals have been appointed as Bishop of the Australian Armed Services (ADF):

Ordinaries of the Australian Armed Services
Name	Term	Other appointment
Bishop of the Armed Services
Thomas Carr	1912–1917	Archbishop of Melbourne: 1886–1917
Daniel Mannix	1917–1963	Archbishop of Melbourne: 1917–1963
Thomas Absolem McCabe	1964–1969	Bishop of Wollongong: 1951–1974
Military Vicar
John Aloysius Morgan	1969–1985	Auxiliary Bishop of Canberra and Goulburn: 1969–1985
Military Ordinary
Geoffrey Mayne	1985–2003	-
Max Davis	2003–2021	-
Stuart Hall	TBC	

=== Principal chaplains ===
From 2018 for the Navy, and as of 2026 in the other two Services (Air Force and Army), ADF Chaplaincy has undergone significant changes in structure, governance and management, and currently there are no Catholic ADF 'Principal' Chaplains (1 star, O-7 rank) nor any 'Senior Chaplains' (O-5 or O-6 rank) in any of the three full-time Services. The pathway for an ADF Chaplain's advancement or promotion to 'Principal Chaplain' has narrowed significantly with the abolition or reduction in numbers of Principal Chaplains, depending on the Service. Principal Chaplain is the highest rank for ADF Chaplains (equivalent to a Navy Commodore, Army Brigadier and Air Force Air-Commodore) and the Directors General of each of the three Services' Chaplaincy branches are typically a Principal Chaplain (Division 5 and O-7). If a Catholic priest ADF Chaplain were to advance to Principal Chaplain, as in the past, they would typically be recommended to the Pope to receive the papal honorific title of 'Monsignor.' They would also typically be an Episcopal Vicar (EV) of the Military bishop and member's of the Ordinariate's College of Consultors.

Whatever the structural changes in ADF Chaplaincy, permanent or temporary, the Military Ordinariate still retains representation at 2-star level having a seat on the Religious Advisory Committee to the Services (RACS) that advises the ADF, the CDF and the Service Chiefs, on religious and spiritual matters.

=== Chaplains ===
Chaplains are charged with the responsibility to care for the religious, spiritual and pastoral (welfare) needs of Defence members and their families. For Catholic chaplains, this includes providing the sacraments, especially to Defence members isolated from civilian Catholic churches/parishes or on war operations. Chaplains, especially those appointed to training establishments, conduct classes on ethics, morals, values and character development with their military units. Chaplains in the Navy, Army and Air Force undergo the same training as other ADF officers.

With only a few exceptions, ordained Catholic chaplains (priests and deacons) are "on loan" to the Military Diocese from a "civilian" diocese for an agreed period of time, which may or may not be renewed. The Bishop of the Military relies on the other Australian bishops for the supply of enough clergy to meet the chaplaincy needs of Catholics in the ADF. It is possible for a priest or deacon to be ordained solely into (incardinated) the Defence Diocese/Military Ordinariate or transfer into it by the process of incardination from a civilian diocese, and thus belong fully to the Military Diocese for life.

ADF chaplains are generally addressed by their first name by Officers of equal or superior rank or as "Sir" by those of lower ranks, however Catholic chaplains are often referred to as "Father" or as "Padre" by soldiers, sailors, and RAAF personnel irrespective of their rank.

=== Divisions ===
Chaplains in the ADF are organised into five divisions that are nominally equated to normal ranks in ADF administration such as PMKeyS and internal regulations and structures:

Divisions of the Ordinariate
Division	Army	RAN^{(1)}	RAAF	Standardised Rank Code	Chaplain Title
1	Captain (Army)	Commander	Flight Lieutenant	O-3	Chaplain
2	Major	Commander	Squadron Leader	O-4	Chaplain
3	Lieutenant Colonel	Commander	Wing Commander	O-5	Senior Chaplain
4	Colonel	Captain	Group Captain	O-6	Senior Chaplain
5	Brigadier	Commodore	Air Commodore	O-7	Principal Chaplain

^(1) Australian Navy Chaplains do not wear normal naval rank insignia. From 2020, they instead wear a shoulder and sleeve device called a 'compass rose' popularly utilised in Church of England/Anglican ecclesial dioceses and institutions, but meant to be a universal symbol of all 'faiths and 'world-views').

== Current chaplains ==
There were 25,614 Catholics in the ADF out of a total of 102,764 (full-time and reservists). Although Catholics constitute the largest religious group in the ADF, the diocese struggles to recruit enough chaplains to serve the Catholic defence population.

Currently there are 17 full-time Catholic Chaplains in the ADF and 18 part-time (Reserve) chaplains, and they are a combination of priest-chaplains(male, celibate), permanent deacon-chaplains (male, married), and lay (non-ordained) chaplains who at times have included female Catholic lay-chaplains.

== Noncombatant status ==
See: Military chaplain#Non-combatant status

== Chapels ==
The Catholic Church through its Military ordinariate has many chapels located on Australian Defence Force establishments, primarily but not exclusively for the use of Catholic personnel. Some chapels are 'non-denominational/ecumenical' shared with non-Catholic Christian denominations. One military Catholic Chapel of unique note is 'Our Lady Star of the Sea Memorial Chapel,' HMAS Cerberus in Victoria, which was built by and is still owned by the Catholic Church via its Military Ordinariate (whereas the land upon which that chapel sits belongs to the Commonwealth of Australia).

== See also ==
- Australian Catholic Bishops Conference
- Australian military chaplains
- Military chaplain badges and insignia
- Operation Testament, the Australian Defence Force contribution to the Catholic World Youth Day 2008
- Patron saints of the military
- Catholic Church in Australia
- Australian Army Chaplains
- Royal Australian Navy Chaplains
