= Gregory O'Kelly =

The Most Reverend Gregory O'Kelly S.J. AM
- Bishop Emeritus of Port Pirie
- Church: Roman Catholic Church
- Diocese: Port Pirie
- See: Port Pirie
- Appointed: 15 April 2009
- Installed: 10 June 2009
- Term ended: 1 August 2020
- Predecessor: Daniel Eugene Hurley
- Successor: Karol Kulczycki
- Previous posts: Auxiliary Bishop of Adelaide (2006–2009); Titular Bishop of Ath Truim (2006–2009); Bishop of Port Pirie (2009–2020); Apostolic Administrator of Adelaide (2018–2020)

Orders
- Ordination: 9 December 1972
- Consecration: 14 September 2006 by Philip Wilson

Personal details
- Born: Gregory O'Kelly; 10 August 1941 (age 84) Adelaide, South Australia, Australia
- Denomination: Catholic (Roman Rite)

Gregory John O'Kelly SJ AM (born 10 August 1941) is an Australian Jesuit prelate of the Catholic Church and the former Bishop of Port Pirie.

== Life ==
O’Kelly was born in Adelaide. He taught at Pentridge Prison and at two schools while preparing for the priesthood. He was ordained a priest for the Society of Jesus in Adelaide in 1972. His career has been largely devoted to education. From 1978 to 1982 he was headmaster at Saint Ignatius' College in Adelaide and from 1982 to 1993 was headmaster at Saint Ignatius' College, Riverview in Sydney. He then returned to his former school to manage its transition to coeducation.

In 1989, he was elected Chairman of the Association of Heads of Independent Schools of Australia, the first Catholic to hold that position.

In 1994, he was awarded the Order of Australia (AM) for services to education.

On 6 July 2006, O'Kelly was appointed Auxiliary Bishop of Adelaide and titular bishop of Ath Truim. He was the first Jesuit to be appointed a bishop in Australia. He was consecrated a bishop on 14 September by Philip Wilson, Archbishop of Adelaide.

On 15 April 2009 he was named Bishop of Port Pirie, the diocese in northern South Australia where the pioneering Australian Jesuits established numerous schools and churches. O'Kelly's family also have strong ties to this region of South Australia.

On 3 June 2018 he was named Apostolic Administrator sede plena of the Archdiocese of Adelaide, where the ordinary, Philip Wilson had "stepped aside" after being convicted of failure to report allegations of sexual abuse to authorities.
