= Francis Peter de Campo =

His Grace Francis Peter de Campo OAM
- Diocese: Port Pirie
- Appointed: 11 August 1980
- Retired: (Died in office)
- Predecessor: Bryan Gallagher
- Successor: Daniel Eugene Hurley

Orders
- Ordination: 24 July 1949 at St Joseph's Church, Beechworth by Bernard Denis Stewart
- Consecration: 13 February 1980 at Sacred Heart Cathedral, Bendigo by James William Gleeson

Personal details
- Born: Melbourne, Victoria
- Died: April 23, 1998 (aged 74)
- Denomination: Roman Catholic
- Occupation: Cleric

Francis Peter de Campo AM, (9 July 1923 − 23 April 1998) was an Australian Catholic bishop, who served a Bishop of Port Pirie for 18 years.

== Early life ==
de Campo was born on 9 July 1923 in Malvern East, the eldest of five children born to Francis Joseph and Marion Mary de Campo. He received his primary education at St Joseph's School, Beechworth and his secondary education from the Marist Brothers at Assumption College, Kilmore, where he played for the school cricket team.

de Campo lost both his parents during childhood. His mother was killed in a motor vehicle accident in Beechworth in 1931, during which his father was also seriously injured. His father, who had served in the Royal Australian Navy in both World War I and World War II, died in 1942, also in a motor vehicle accident.

In 1943, he entered Corpus Christi College in Werribee to study for the priesthood.

== Priesthood ==
de Campo was ordained a priest for the Diocese of Sandhurst on 24 July 1949 at St Joseph's Church, Beechworth by Bishop Bernard Denis Stewart. It was the first ordination to ever be held in the church. After ordination, he returned to Corpus Christi College to complete his studies.

His first appointment as priest was serving at Sacred Heart Cathedral, Bendigo. He continued to play cricket after ordination. He also served as the Diocesan Master of Ceremonies after his ordination.

In 1954, he received an appointment to serve as a migrant chaplain with British emigrants coming to Australia. He was also engaged with working among Dutch migrants in the Diocese of Sandhurst.

In 1962, de Campo was involved in a high-profile bigamy case. He had officiated the wedding of Edwin John Soanes, who had falsified a declaration which said he was a bachelor, when in fact, he had a wife in England. de Campo testified during the trial and gave evidence Soanes had signed a pre-nuptial declaration before his marriage.

Later, he was appointed parish priest of St Kilian's Church, Bendigo and also served as Vicar General of the Diocese of Sandhurst for many years.

== Episcopacy ==
On 29 October 1979, de Campo was appointed Coadjutor Bishop of the Diocese of Port Pirie. He was consecrated a bishop on 13 February 1980 at Sacred Heart Cathedral, Bendigo by Archbishop James William Gleeson and succeeded Bishop Bryan Gallagher as Bishop of Port Pirie on 11 August 1980.

As bishop, de Campo looked after the second largest diocese in the state, at 967,860 square kilometres, and home to 30,000 Catholics. During an ad limina visit to Rome in 1983, de Campo is said to have quipped that the diocese had "more kangaroos than Catholics".

During his 18 years as Bishop of Port Pirie, he assisted in the construction of new churches and new school facilities for the vast diocese.

He was made a Member of the Order of Australia (AM) in the 1986 Australia Day Honours for "service to the community and religion".

== Death ==
de Campo died in 1998 while still in office.
