= Archbishop of Sydney =

Archbishop of Sydney may refer to:

- Anglican Archbishop of Sydney
- Catholic Bishops and Archbishops of Sydney, since 1842
- Archdiocese of Sydney
