= Diocese of Darwin =

Latin Catholic territory in Australia

Diocese of Darwin Dioecesis Darvinensis
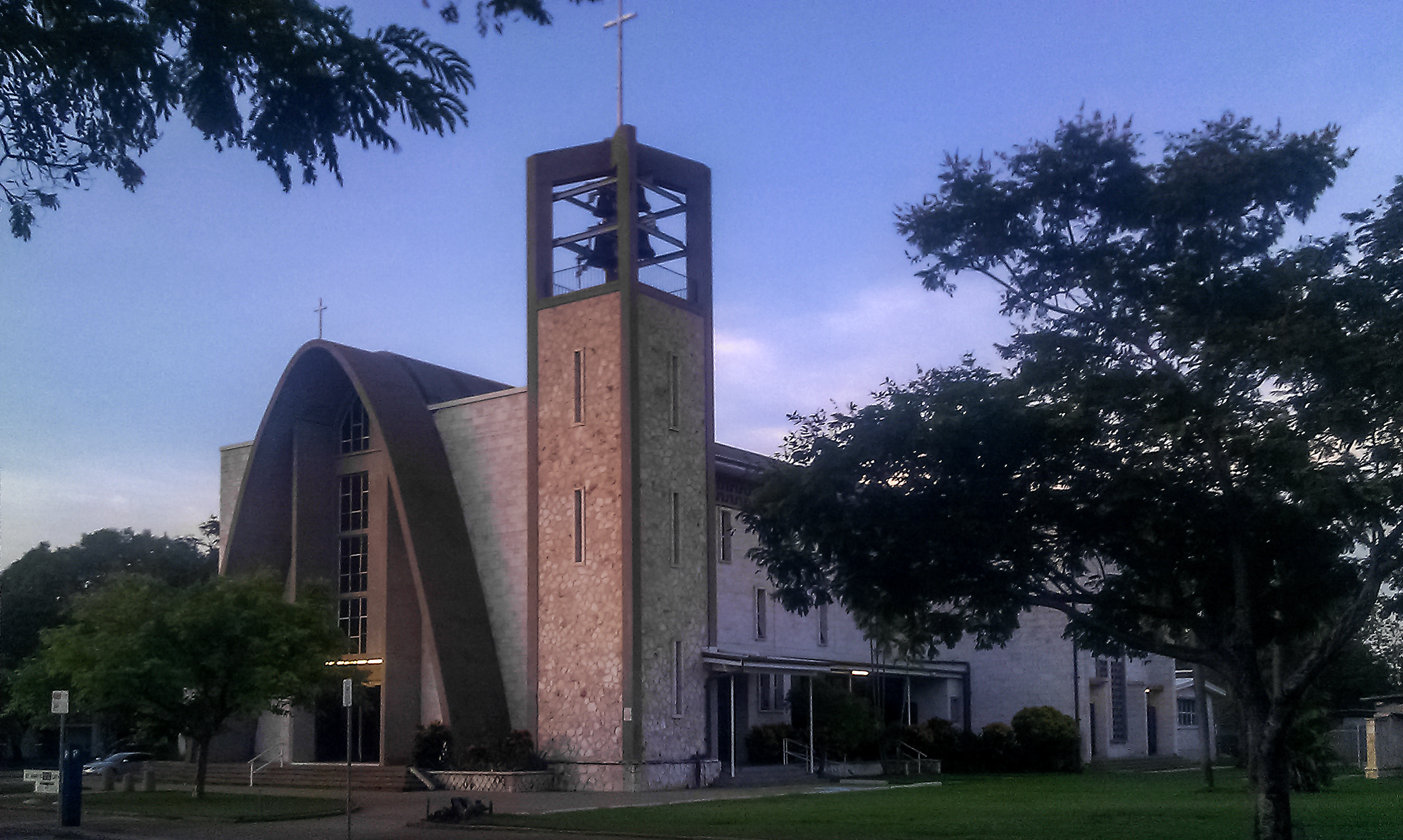
- St. Mary's Cathedral

Location
- Country: Australia
- Territory: Northern Territory
- Ecclesiastical province: Province of Adelaide
- Metropolitan: Archdiocese of Adelaide
- Coordinates: 12°26′45″S 130°50′19″E

Statistics
- Area: 1,352,212 km^{2} (522,092 sq mi)
- Population: Total; Catholics: (as of 2009); ▲205,900; ▲45,600 ( 22.1%)
- Parishes: 11

Information
- Denomination: Catholic Church
- Sui iuris church: Latin Church
- Rite: Roman Rite
- Established: 1845 as the Vicariate Apostolic of Essington; 27 May 1847 as the Diocese of Victoria; 10 August as the Diocese of Victoria-Palmerston; 29 March 1938 as the Diocese of Darwin
- Cathedral: St Mary's Star of the Sea Cathedral, Darwin

Current leadership
- Pope: Leo XIV
- Bishop: Charles Gauci
- Bishops emeritus: Daniel Eugene Hurley

Map

Website
- darwin.catholic.org.au

The Diocese of Darwin is a Latin Church ecclesiastical jurisdiction or diocese of the Catholic Church in Darwin, Northern Territory, Australia. It is a suffragan in the ecclesiastical province of the metropolitan Archdiocese of Adelaide.

As the largest diocese in Australia by physical area covered, the Diocese of Darwin was initially administered by the Vicariate Apostolic of New Holland and Van Diemen's Land. In 1845, the Vicariate Apostolic of Essington was erected; becoming elevated as part of the Diocese of Victoria in 1847; as the Diocese of Victoria–Palmerston in 1888; and its name changed to the Diocese of Darwin in 1938.

== Ordinaries ==
Ordinaries of Darwin:

Order	Name	Title	Date enthroned	Reign ended	Term of office	Reason for term end
1	Joseph Serra y Juliá, OSB †	Bishop of Victoria	9 July 1847	7 August 1849	2 years, 29 days	Elevated as Coadjutor Bishop of Perth
2	Rosendo Salvado, OSB †	Bishop of Victoria	9 August 1849	1 August 1888	38 years, 358 days	Resigned and appointed as Titular Bishop of Adraa
3	Francis Xavier Gsell, MSC †	Apostolic Administrator of Victoria-Palmerston	23 April 1906	29 March 1938	31 years, 340 days	Elevated as Bishop of Darwin
3	Francis Xavier Gsell, MSC †	Bishop of Darwin	29 March 1938	10 November 1948	10 years, 226 days	Retired and appointed as Bishop Emeritus of Darwin
4	John Patrick O'Loughlin, MSC †	Bishop of Darwin	13 January 1949	14 November 1985	36 years, 305 days	Died in office
5	Edmund John Patrick Collins, MSC †	Bishop of Darwin	28 April 1986	3 July 2007	21 years, 66 days	Retired and appointed as Bishop Emeritus of Darwin
6	Eugene Hurley	Bishop of Darwin	3 July 2007	27 June 2018	10 years, 359 days	Retired and appointed as Bishop Emeritus of Darwin
7	Charles Gauci	Bishop of Darwin	26 September 2018	present	7 years, 258 days	

== Cathedral ==
See St Mary's Star of the Sea Cathedral, Darwin.

== See also ==
- Catholic Church in Australia
