= Christopher Prowse =

Australian Catholic prelate (born 1953)

The Most Reverend Christopher Prowse
- Archbishop of Canberra and Goulburn
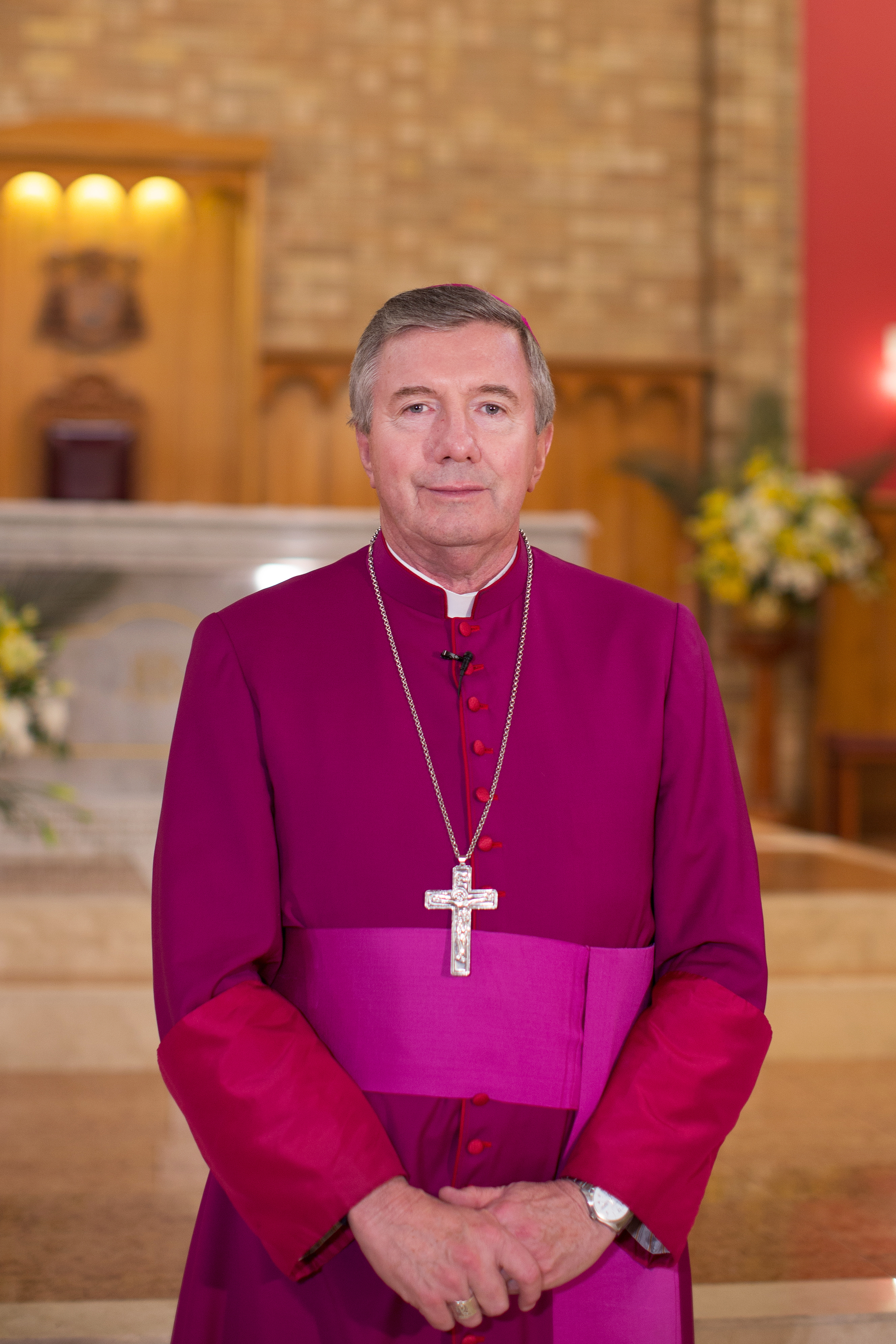
- Prowse in St Christopher's Cathedral (2015)
- Church: Catholic Church
- Archdiocese: Canberra and Goulburn
- Province: Immediately Subject to the Holy See
- Appointed: 12 September 2013
- Installed: 19 November 2013
- Predecessor: Mark Coleridge
- Successor: Incumbent
- Other post: Apostolic Administrator of the Australian Catholic Military Ordinariate (2021‍–‍ )
- Previous posts: Auxiliary Bishop of Melbourne (2003‍–‍2009); Titular Bishop of Bahanna (2003‍–‍2009); Bishop of Sale (2009‍–‍2013)

Orders
- Ordination: 16 August 1980, St Patrick's Cathedral, Melbourne by Thomas Francis Little
- Consecration: 19 May 2003, St Patrick's Cathedral, Melbourne by Denis Hart

Personal details
- Born: Christopher Charles Prowse; 14 November 1953 (age 72) East Melbourne, Victoria, Australia
- Education: Monash University; Melbourne College of Divinity; Pontifical Gregorian University; Pontifical Lateran University
- Motto: Only Jesus

Styles of Christopher Prowse
- Reference style: His Grace, The Most Reverend
- Spoken style: Your Grace
- Religious style: Archbishop

Christopher Charles Prowse (born 14 November 1953) is an Australian Catholic prelate. He is the Archbishop of the Archdiocese of Canberra and Goulburn; appointed to the post in 2013. He is also the Apostolic Administrator of the Australian Catholic Military Ordinariate.

Prowse served as the director of the Catholic Pastoral Formation Centre (1997−2001) and from 1999 was the media spokesman. He has been co-chair of the Australian Anglican and Roman Catholic Dialogue, and a member of the executive committee of the Federation of Catholic Bishops Conferences in Oceania. In 2007, Pope Benedict XVI appointed him a member of the Pontifical Council for Interreligious Dialogue. He has a Bachelor of Arts degree (Monash University 1978), a Bachelor of Theology degree (Melbourne College of Divinity 1979), a Licentiate in Moral Theology (Pontifical Gregorian University, Rome, 1987) and a Doctorate in Moral Theology (Pontifical Lateran University - Alfonsianum Academy, Rome, 1995).

== Early life and career ==
Christopher Charles Prowse was born in East Melbourne, Victoria, on 14 November 1953. He is the third of six children of Frank Prowse and Marian Atkinson. His early education was at St Francis Xavier's Primary School in Box Hill and St Leo's College also in Box Hill. He was an altar server at St Francis Xavier's Parish, Box Hill. While at St Leo's College he enjoyed drama and public speaking and was the school captain in 1971.

He studied for the priesthood at Corpus Christi College in Werribee (1972) and Clayton (1973–1980). After serving as a deacon at St John's, Mitcham, in 1979, he was ordained priest for the Archdiocese of Melbourne by Sir Frank Little at St Patrick's Cathedral, Melbourne, on 16 August 1980. He was appointed assistant priest of St Mary of the Angels, Geelong (1981–1983), and of St Monica's, Moonee Ponds (1984–1985). He was also vocations director throughout 1984–1985. From 1988 and 2001 he was lecturer in moral theology at the Catholic Theological College and from 1988 priest-in-residence at St Mary's, Thornbury. In 1996, he was appointed parish priest of Holy Spirit Parish, East Thornbury. During this time Prowse was also director of the Catholic Pastoral Formation Centre (1997–2001) and from 1999 he was their media spokesman.

In August 2001 he was named vicar general and moderator of the curia of the Archdiocese of Melbourne, after a short appointment as assistant of the diocesan administrator. At this time he became a member of the College of Consultors of the archdiocese, and of other major committees. On 6 October 2001 he was appointed a Chaplain of His Holiness with the title of Monsignor.

== Episcopate ==
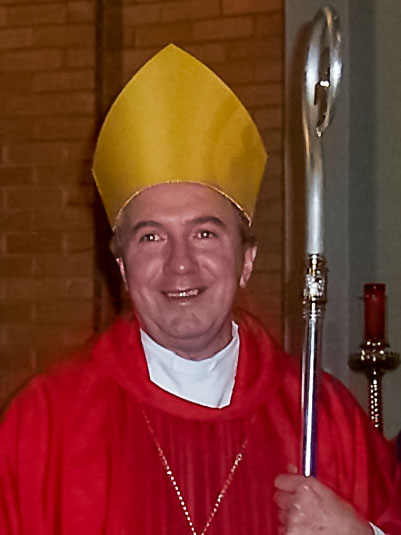
Prowse in 2006

On 4 April 2003, Pope John Paul II named him Titular Bishop of Bahanana and an auxiliary bishop of Melbourne; he was consecrated at St Patrick's Cathedral, Melbourne, by Denis Hart on 19 May 2003. From 2007 until 2009 he had pastoral responsibility for the Western Region of Melbourne and Geelong. In 2007 he became the Episcopal Vicar for Justice and Social Services, and in 2008 for health. He was appointed to committees organising Days in the Diocese Melbourne and World Youth Day Sydney.

Prowse was appointed as the Bishop of Sale by Pope Benedict XVI on 18 June 2009.

On 12 September 2013, Pope Francis appointed Prowse as Archbishop of Canberra and Goulburn. He was installed on 19 November 2013 at St Christopher's Cathedral, Canberra. His appointment followed a period of 16 months during which the post was vacant after the previous archbishop, Mark Coleridge, was appointed as the Archbishop of Brisbane.

On 12 September 2016, Prowse was named as apostolic administrator of the Diocese of Wagga Wagga following the retirement of Gerard Hanna. On 26 May 2020, Pope Francis announced Mark Stuart Edwards would become the sixth Bishop of Wagga Wagga, with Prowse continuing as apostolic administrator until Edwards' installation on 22 July 2020.

Within the Australian Catholic Bishops' Conference, Prowse is a member of the Permanent Committee and chairman of the Commission on Ecumenism and Inter-religious Relations; he is a member of the Commission for Relations with Aborigines and Torres Strait Islanders.

== See also ==
- Catholic Church in Australia
- List of Catholic bishops in Australia
- List of Catholic dioceses in Australia

Catholic Church titles
Preceded by Mark Coleridge	Archdiocese of Canberra–Goulburn; 2013–present	Incumbent
Preceded by Jeremiah Coffey	Bishop of Sale; 2009–2013	Succeeded by Patrick O'Regan
