= Operation Testament =

Operation Testament was the Australian Defence Force (ADF) contribution to World Youth Day 2008 (WYD08), a Catholic youth festival attended by Pope Benedict XVI held from 15 to 20 July 2008 in Sydney, Australia.

The ADF provided personnel and equipment, drawn from the Army, Navy and Air Force in support of WYD08 objectives in specialist and niche capabilities. The ADF carried out the logistics for an international ‘Military Pilgrims’ program as well as security support to the NSW Police Force for the event.

Up to 370 ADF personnel were involved in Operation Testament. The ADF stated that its "...involvement in WYD08 is symbolic of the faith, across all religions, that guides its people in Australia and overseas."

== See also ==
- World Youth Day 2008
