= Diocese of Port Pirie =

Latin Catholic diocese in Australia

Diocese of Port Pirie Dioecesis Portus Piriensis

Location
- Country: Australia
- Territory: Yorke and Eyre Peninsulas, Flinders Ranges, Nullarbor Plain, and Mid and Far North regions of South Australia
- Ecclesiastical province: Adelaide
- Coordinates: 33°10′46″S 138°00′29″E

Statistics
- Area: 978,823 km^{2} (377,926 sq mi)
- Population: Total; Catholics: (as of 2004); ▼166,713; ▼28,653 (▼17.2%)
- Parishes: 23

Information
- Denomination: Catholic Church
- Sui iuris church: Latin Church
- Rite: Roman Rite
- Established: 10 May 1887 as Diocese of Port Augusta; 7 June 1951 as Diocese of Port Pirie
- Cathedral: St Mark's Cathedral, Port Pirie

Current leadership
- Pope: Leo XIV
- Bishop-Elect: Karol Kulczycki SDS
- Bishops emeritus: Gregory O'Kelly SJ

Map

Website
- http://www.pp.catholic.org.au

The Diocese of Port Pirie is a Latin Church ecclesiastical jurisdiction or diocese of the Catholic Church in Australia. It is a suffragan in the ecclesiastical province of the metropolitan Archdiocese of Adelaide, erected in 1887 covering the Yorke and Eyre Peninsulas, Flinders Ranges, Nullarbor Plain, and Mid and Far North regions of South Australia, Australia.

== History ==
The Diocese of Port Augusta was canonically erected by Pope Leo XIII on 10 May 1887, the same day the pope elevated the See of Adelaide to a metropolitan archdiocese and placed the new diocese in its province. On 5 August 1951 the seat of the diocese was moved from Port Augusta to Port Pirie, with the name of the diocese being also changed.

== Churches ==
As well as St Mark's Cathedral in Port Pirie, there are churches in Barmera, Berri, Booleroo Centre, Burra, Carrieton, Ceduna, Chandana, Cleve, Coffin Bay, Coober Pedy, Cowell, Chrystal Brook, Cummins, Ellison, Gladstone, Hawker, Jamestown, Kadina, Kimba, Laura, Loxton, Moonta, Morgan, Orroroo, Peterborough, Port Augusta, Port Broughton, Port Lincoln, Quorn, Redhill, Renmark, Roxby Downs, Streaky Bay, Tumby Bay, Waikerie, Wallaroo, Whyalla Playford, Whyalla Stuart, Wilmington, Wudinna, and Yulara.

== Bishops ==
The following men have been Bishops of Port Pirie or any of its precursor titles:

Order	Name	Title	Date enthroned	Reign ended	Term of office	Reason for term end
1	John O'Reily †	Bishop of Port Augusta	13 May 1887	5 January 1895	7 years, 237 days	Elevated as Archbishop of Adelaide
2	James Maher †	Bishop of Port Augusta	10 January 1896	20 December 1905	9 years, 344 days	Died in office
3	John Henry Norton †	Bishop of Port Augusta	18 August 1906	22 March 1923	16 years, 216 days	Died in office
4	Andrew Killian †	Bishop of Port Augusta	26 February 1924	11 July 1933	9 years, 135 days	Elevated as Coadjutor Archbishop of Adelaide
5	Norman Thomas Gilroy †	Bishop of Port Augusta	10 December 1934	1 July 1937	2 years, 203 days	Elevated as Coadjutor Archbishop of Sydney
6	John Joseph Lonergan †	Bishop-Elect of Port Augusta	8 January 1938	14 July 1938	187 days	Died prior to being ordained as Bishop
7	Thomas Absolem McCabe †	Bishop of Port Augusta	13 December 1938	15 November 1951	12 years, 337 days	Appointed as Bishop of Wollongong
8	Bryan Gallagher †	Bishop of Port Pirie	13 March 1952	11 August 1980	28 years, 151 days	Resigned and appointed Bishop Emeritus of Port Pirie
9	Francis Peter de Campo †	Bishop of Port Pirie	11 August 1980	23 April 1998	17 years, 255 days	Died in office
10	Daniel Eugene Hurley	Bishop of Port Pirie	27 November 1998	3 July 2007	8 years, 218 days	Appointed as Bishop of Darwin
11	Gregory O'Kelly SJ	Bishop of Port Pirie	15 April 2009	1 August 2020	17 years, 200 days	Retired
12	Karol Kulczycki SDS	Bishop of Port Pirie				

=== Coadjutor bishop ===
- Francis Peter de Campo † (1979–1980)

=== Other priest of this diocese who became bishop ===
- Francis Augustin Henschke †, appointed Auxiliary Bishop of Adelaide in 1937

== Sexual abuse cases ==
The Royal Commission into Institutionalised Responses to Child Sexual Abuse revealed that Port Pirie was the third-worst diocese in the country, with 14.1% of its priests accused of abuse.

In 2007, Father Charles Barnett was arrested in Jakarta, Indonesia where he had fled in 1995, and extradited to Australia. Barnett pled guilty in 2009 to three child sex charges for events between 1977 and 1985 at Crystal Brook and Port Pirie. He was sentenced for a fourth crime occurring in 1994 and was rearrested in for other crimes after his release.

== See also ==
- Catholic Church in Australia
