= Max Leroy Davis =

Australian Catholic bishop (b. 1945)

The Most Reverend Max Davis AM
- Bishop emeritus of the Australian Defence Force
- See: Military Ordinariate of Australia
- Installed: 22 August 2003
- Term ended: 24 May 2021
- Predecessor: Geoffrey Mayne

Orders
- Ordination: 31 October 1971
- Consecration: 22 August 2003 by Geoffrey Mayne

Personal details
- Born: Maxwell Leroy Davis; 16 August 1945 (age 81) Townsville, Queensland
- Denomination: Catholic
- Coat of arms

Maxwell Leroy Davis AM (born 16 August 1945) is a retired Catholic bishop who served as the bishop of the Catholic Military Ordinariate of Australia.

Davis grew up in Perth. In his late teens, he served in the Royal Australian Navy in 1962–1964, later returning to Western Australia. Davis worked as a teacher at Saint Benedict's College in New Norcia in the late 1960s. He was ordained in 1971. He worked as a chaplain in the Army reserves and as a priest in the Archdiocese of Perth.

Davis was made a Member of the Order of Australia in 1998 for service to the navy, particularly as Director General of Chaplaincy-Navy.

On 16 July 2003, Davis was appointed bishop of the Australian Military Ordinariate. He was consecrated bishop on 22 August 2003 by Bishop Geoffrey Mayne with Archbishop Francis Patrick Carroll of Canberra and Goulburn and Archbishop Francesco Canalini, Apostolic Nuncio to Australia as co-consecratirs.

In June 2014, Western Australian police charged Davis with having indecently assaulted a 13-year-old boy in 1969, before he had been ordained. Davis denied the charges and stood aside from his roles of office while the charges were heard. On 7 August 2015, he pleaded not guilty, and a six-day trial was set down to start on 6 February 2016 in the District Court of Western Australia. The six counts related to the period between December 1968 and October 1972 when Davis was dorm master at St Benedict's College at New Norcia. The defence case accepted that the boys were abused, but denied that Davis was the culprit, identifying other (now dead) possible offenders. He was acquitted of all charges on 15 February 2016. He returned to public ministry in December 2017.

Pope Francis accepted his resignation on 24 May 2021.

Preceded by Geoffrey Mayne	Military Ordinary of Australia	Succeeded by vacant
