= Michael Kelly (bishop) =

Irish-born Roman Catholic bishop

The Most Reverend Michael Kelly
- Archbishop of Sydney
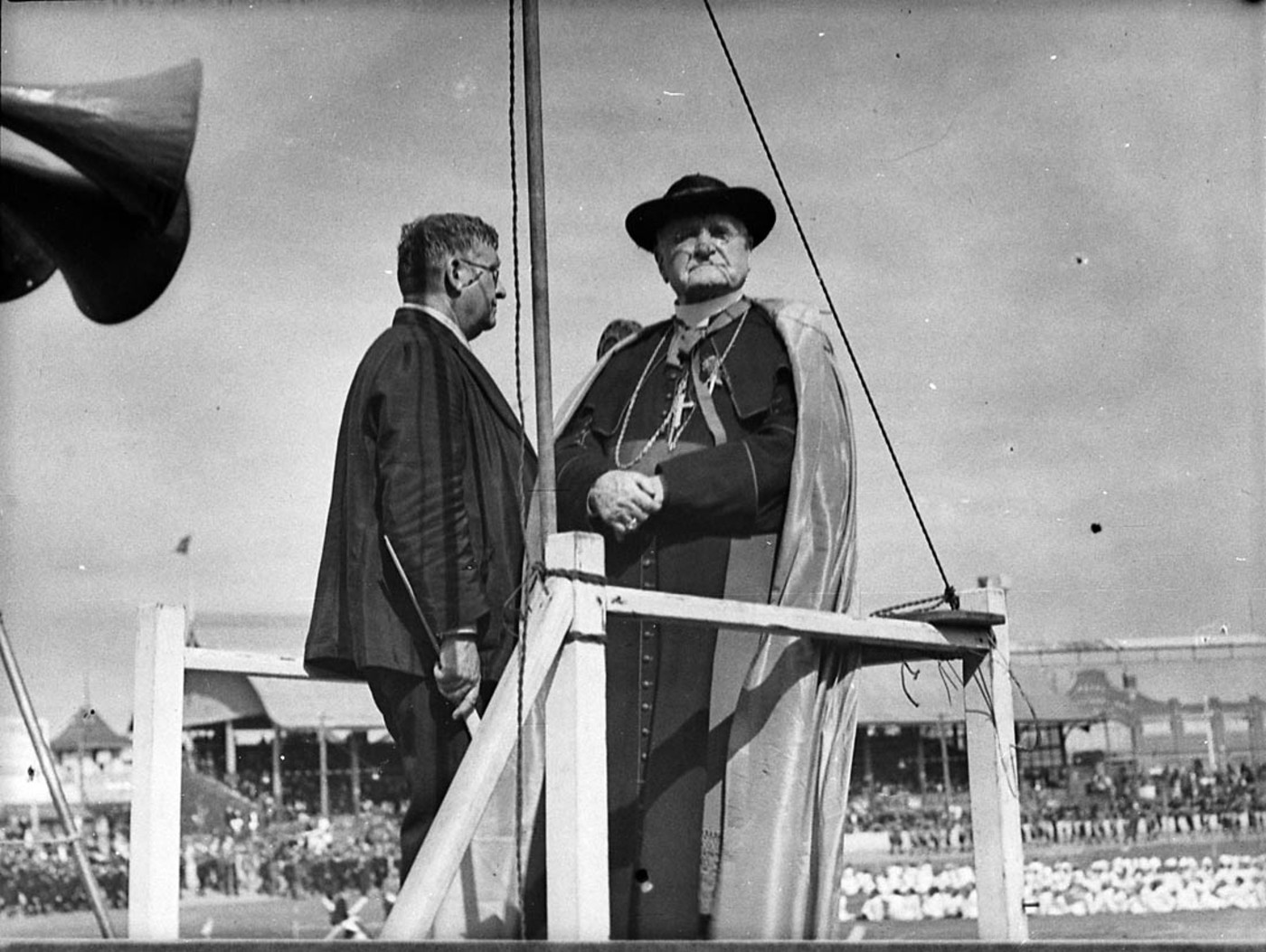
- Kelly pictured at the 1939 Saint Patrick's Day celebrations held at the Sydney Showgrounds in Paddington, Sydney. Image captured by Sam Hood.
- Church: Roman Catholic
- Archdiocese: Sydney
- Installed: 16 August 1911
- Term ended: 8 March 1940
- Predecessor: Patrick Moran
- Successor: Norman Thomas Gilroy
- Other post: Archbishop of Achrida

Orders
- Ordination: 1 November 1872 by Thomas Furlong
- Consecration: 20 July 1901 by Francesco Satolli

Personal details
- Born: 13 February 1850 Waterford, Ireland
- Died: 8 March 1940 (aged 90) Sydney, Australia
- Buried: St Mary's Cathedral, Sydney
- Denomination: Roman Catholic
- Parents: James Kelly; Mary née Grant
- Occupation: Australian Catholic Prelate
- Education: St Peter's College, Wexford; Irish College in Rome

Styles of Michael Kelly
- Reference style: The Most Reverend
- Spoken style: Your Grace or My Lord Archbishop
- Religious style: Archbishop

Michael Kelly (13 February 1850 – 8 March 1940) was an Irish-born Roman Catholic bishop who became the fourth Archbishop of Sydney.

== Early life ==
Born at Waterford, Ireland, to James Kelly, a master mariner, and Mary née Grant, Kelly was educated at Christian Brothers’, Enniscorthy and the Classical Academy, New Ross.

Kelly received his seminary formation at St Peter's College, Wexford. and the Irish College in Rome, before being ordained at Enniscorthy on 1 November 1872 by Bishop Thomas Furlong.

Kelly served on the staff of the House of Missions, Wexford and was made vice-rector of the Irish College in Rome in 1891. In 1894 he become rector of the college and as such an important figure in Anglophone Catholicism.

== Episcopal ministry ==
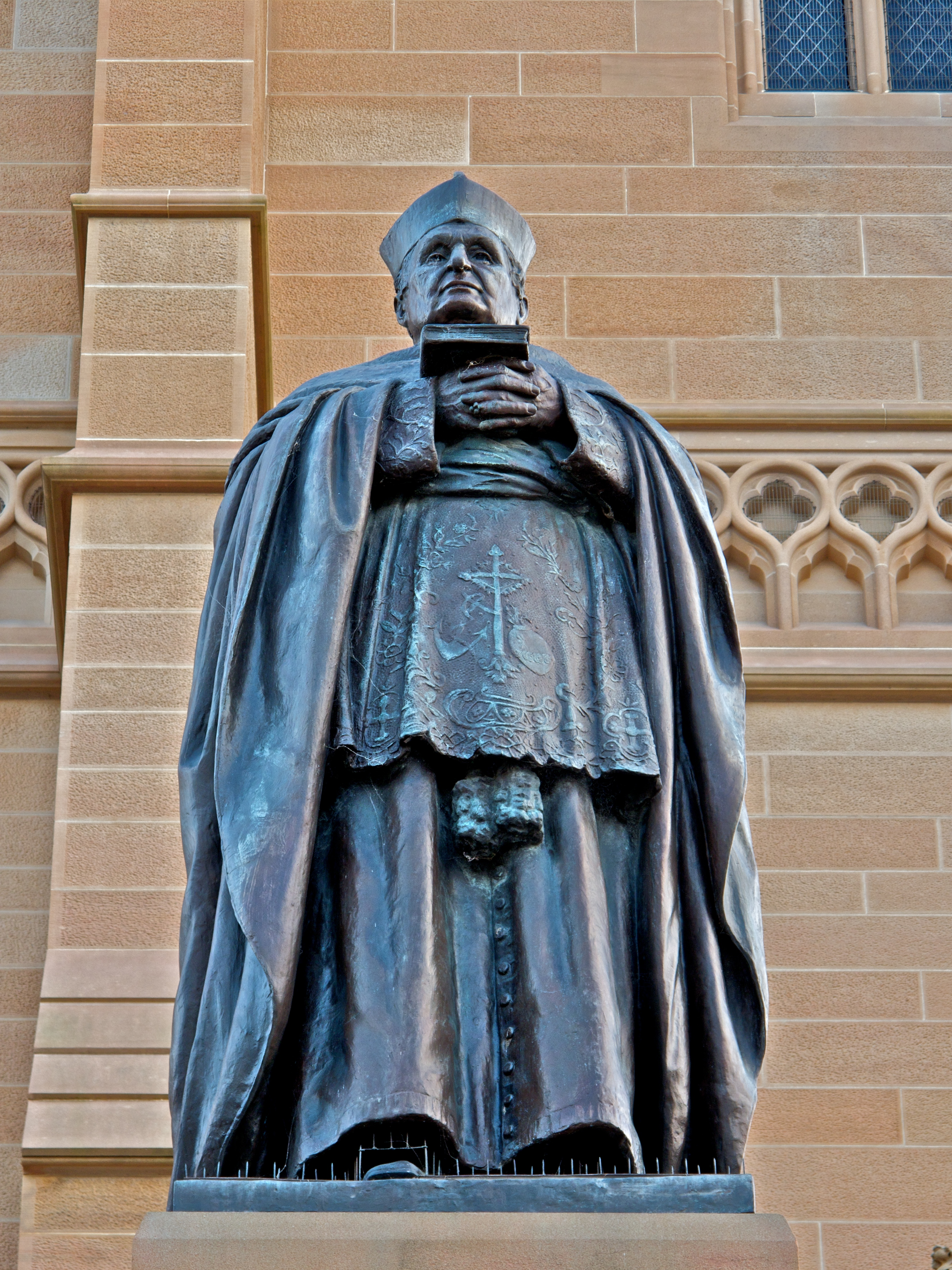
A statue of Kelly by Bertram Mackennal at St Mary's Cathedral

Elected Archbishop of Achrida In Partibus Infidelium and coadjutor cum jure successionis of Sydney on 20 July 1901, Kelly received episcopal consecration as coadjutor archbishop on 15 August 1901 at St Joachim's Church, Rome, by Cardinal Francesco Satolli.

Kelly eventually succeeded to the See of Sydney on 16 August 1911 on the death of Cardinal Moran.

During the 1918 Spanish flu pandemic, Kelly publicly criticised the federal government's "impious refusal" to allow Catholic priests to minister to dying victims, in particular nurse Annie Egan who died without receiving the last rites. He sent a telegram of protest to acting prime minister William Watt, and then when no response was received attempted to enter the North Head Quarantine Station, where he was told he would be arrested if he attempted to enter.

As Kelly continued his crusade for temperance and he undertook extensive fund-raising for Catholic schools. It is estimated that £12,000,000 was spent on scholastic and church properties from the time of Kelly's arrival in Sydney until his death. St Mary's Cathedral was completed in 1928 and statues of Kelly and Moran stand in the main portal. He took a less belligerent attitude to sectarian tensions and political questions such as Irish affairs than Archbishop Mannix of Melbourne.

In recognition of his extensive service to the church, Kelly was named Assistant to the papal throne, associated with the title Roman count, on 25 June 1926. Kelly died in Sydney aged 90, still of sound mind.

== See also ==
- Catholic Bishops and Archbishops of Sydney

Catholic Church titles
Preceded by Patrick Francis Moran	4th Catholic Archbishop of Sydney; 1911–1940	Succeeded by Norman Thomas Gilroy
