= Norman Gilroy =

Australian bishop

His Eminence Sir Norman Gilroy KBE
- Cardinal, Archbishop of Sydney
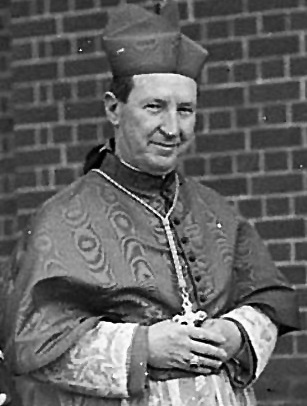
- Gilroy in 1946
- Church: Roman Catholic Church
- Archdiocese: Sydney
- See: Sydney
- Appointed: 8 March 1940
- Term ended: 9 July 1971
- Predecessor: Michael Kelly
- Successor: James Darcy Freeman
- Other posts: Cardinal-Priest of Santi Quattro Coronati (1946–71); President of the Australian Episcopal Conference (1958–71)
- Previous posts: Bishop of Port Augusta (1934–1937); Titular Archbishop of Cypsela (1937–1940); Coadjutor Archbishop of Sydney (1937–1940)

Orders
- Ordination: 24 December 1923 by Willem Marinus van Rossum
- Consecration: 17 March 1935 by Filippo Bernardini
- Created cardinal: 18 February 1946 by Pope Pius XII
- Rank: Cardinal-Priest

Personal details
- Born: Norman Thomas Gilroy; 22 January 1896 Glebe, Sydney, Colony of New South Wales (now New South Wales, Australia)
- Died: 21 October 1977 (aged 81) Lewisham, Sydney, New South Wales, Australia
- Buried: St. Mary's Cathedral, Sydney
- Denomination: Catholic (Roman Rite)
- Education: Marist Brothers' College; Pontifical Urbaniana University
- Motto: Christus lux mea
- Coat of arms: Norman Gilroy's coat of arms

Styles of Norman Gilroy
- Reference style: His Eminence
- Spoken style: Your Eminence
- Informal style: Cardinal
- See: Sydney

Sir Norman Thomas Gilroy KBE (22 January 1896 – 21 October 1977) was an Australian bishop. He was the first Australian-born cardinal of the Roman Catholic Church.

== Early life and priestly ministry ==
Gilroy was born in Sydney to working-class parents of Irish descent. Educated at the Marist Brothers' College in the Sydney suburb of Kogarah, he left school when 13 years old to work as a messenger boy in what was then the Postmaster-General's Department. In 1914, his parents refused permission for him to enlist in the Australian Imperial Force for service in the First World War, but he was allowed to volunteer for the transport service as a telegraphist. He left Australia in February 1915 and served in the Gallipoli campaign in 1915 as a naval wireless operator on the Hessen off Gallipoli and Imbros.

After his return to Australia in August 1915, he was ordered to resume his work as a telegraphist for the postal service. He expressed an interest in becoming a priest and began his studies at St Columba's Springwood in 1917 and continued from 1919 at the Urban College in Rome. He was ordained a priest for the Diocese of Lismore on 24 December 1923 at the Basilica di San Giovanni in Laterano in Rome by Archbishop Filippo Bernardini C.Ss.R. He received his doctorate in divinity in Rome the following year.

Returning to Australia in 1924, Gilroy was appointed to the staff of the apostolic delegation in Sydney, which in that year received as its new head, Archbishop Bartolomeo Cattaneo, who favoured the appointment of Australian-born priests as bishops in Australia. After six years in this post, Gilroy returned to Lismore, becoming chancellor and secretary of the bishop.

== Episcopal ministry ==
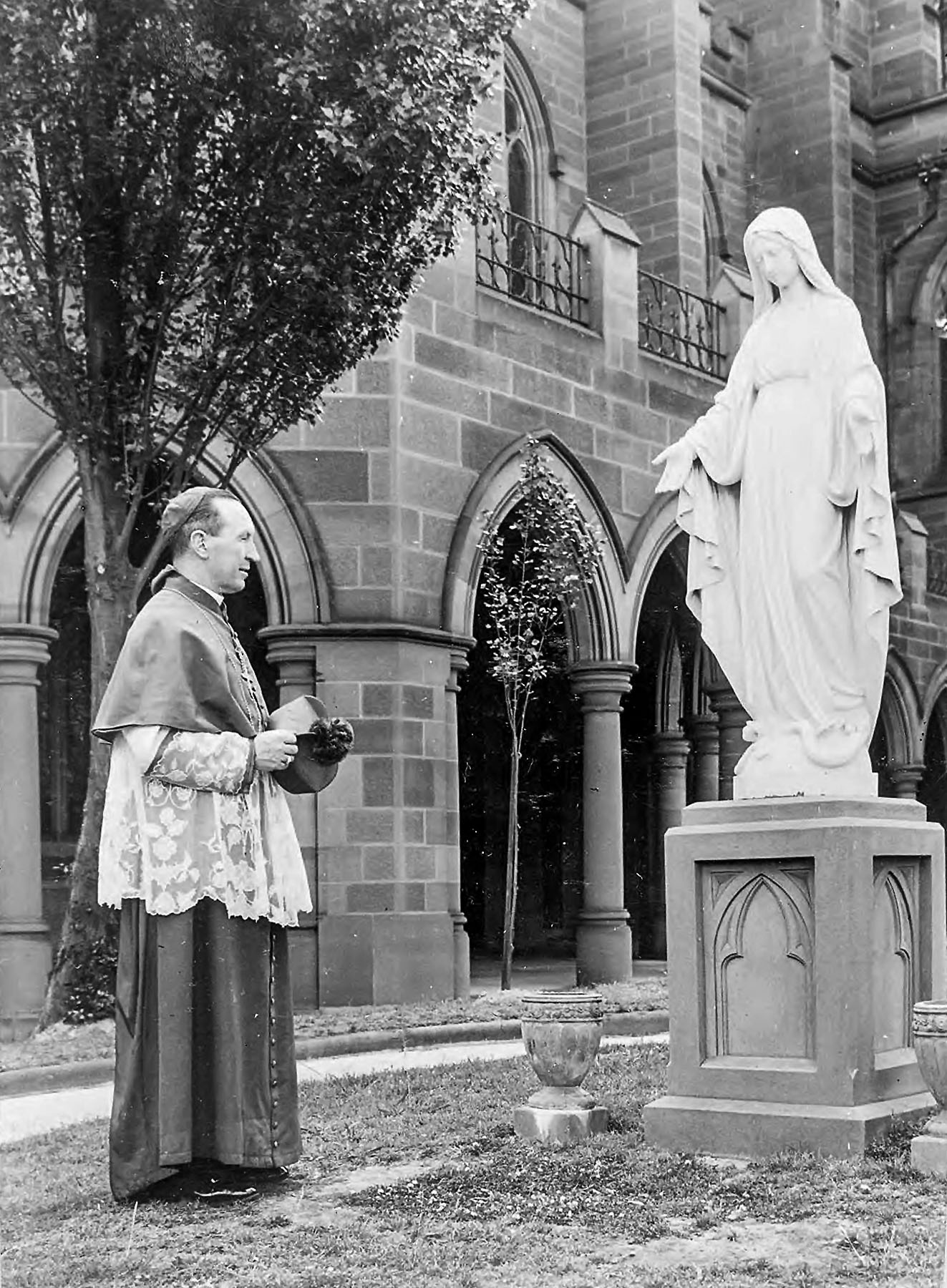
Gilroy circa 1955, standing before a statue of the Virgin Mary

In December 1934, he was appointed Bishop of Port Augusta, South Australia, gaining an experience in dealing with pastoral problems that was to serve him well in his later position. He received episcopal consecration on St Patrick's Day 1935 with Archbishop Filippo Bernardini as principal consecrator.

In 1937, he became Coadjutor Archbishop of Sydney and Titular Archbishop of Argyranthemum. On the death of Archbishop Michael Kelly, Gilroy succeeded to the Archdiocese of Sydney on 18 March 1940.

Gilroy was created a cardinal by Pope Pius XII on 18 February 1946, and was assigned the title of cardinal-priest of Santi Quattro Coronati, becoming the first Australian-born member of the College of Cardinals.

On 11 January 1953 he laid the cornerstone of the National Shrine of Our Mother of Perpetual Help, Philippines.

He participated in the papal conclave of 1958 which elected Pope John XXIII, and in the papal conclave of 1963 which elected Pope Paul VI.

Gilroy was knighted in 1969. He was the first Roman Catholic cardinal to receive a knighthood since the English Reformation. He was named Australian of the Year in 1970. He resigned as Archbishop of Sydney in July 1971 and died in Sydney in 1977, aged 81. He was succeeded by James Darcy Freeman.

As archbishop, Gilroy enforced strict discipline in accordance with the Code of Canon Law on his clergy, who had grown lax under the elderly Kelly. In so doing, he acquired a reputation of an "iron man". He always maintained his exacting standards but showed compassion for those who failed to meet them.

Much of his energy was devoted to providing churches and schools for his flock. By 1971, he had 366 schools with 115,704 pupils, staffed by 751 religious brothers and 2,992 nuns as well as lay teachers. He was unable to bring to concrete realisation his plan to establish a Catholic university but was to some extent successful in his project to found a faculty of theology at Manly.

The 1954 split of the Australian Labor Party saw a marked difference of opinion between Gilroy and Archbishop Daniel Mannix of Melbourne, who backed B. A. Santamaria's "Movement" (the episcopally-sponsored Catholic Social Studies Movement). Gilroy avoided direct political comment and believed that the church should not become involved in politics. However, like most other Sydney Irish Roman Catholics, he had grown up as a supporter of the Labor Party. Moreover, he was a confidant of the Roman Catholic Labor Premier of New South Wales Joseph Cahill. He firmly opposed Santamaria's activities and banned the distribution of his movement's literature in Sydney churches. As a result of the close relationship between Gilroy and Cahill, there was no split in the New South Wales Labor Party, as there had been in Victoria and Queensland.

In 2017, the first extended biography of Gilroy was published to coincide with the 40th anniversary of the cardinal's death. The author, John Luttrell, has been praised for his "fresh research ... and a genuine portrait of the man who rose from postal clerk to prince of the Church."

== Legacy ==
Gilroy College, a Year 7–12 high school in north-western Sydney named after him opened in 1980. The college took Gilroy's personal motto, "Christ is my light", as the official school motto. Gilroy College celebrated its 25th anniversary as a school community in 2004.

Catholic Church titles
Preceded by Andrew Killian	5th Bishop of Port Augusta; 1934–1937	Succeeded by John Joseph Lonergan
Preceded by Michael Kelly	5th Catholic Archbishop of Sydney; 1940–1971	Succeeded by James Darcy Freeman
Preceded by Karl Joseph Schulte	Cardinal-Priest of Santi Quattro Coronati; 1946–1977	Succeeded by Julijans Vaivods
