= St Mark's Cathedral, Port Pirie =

Coordinates: 33°10′46″S 138°00′29″E

St Mark's Cathedral
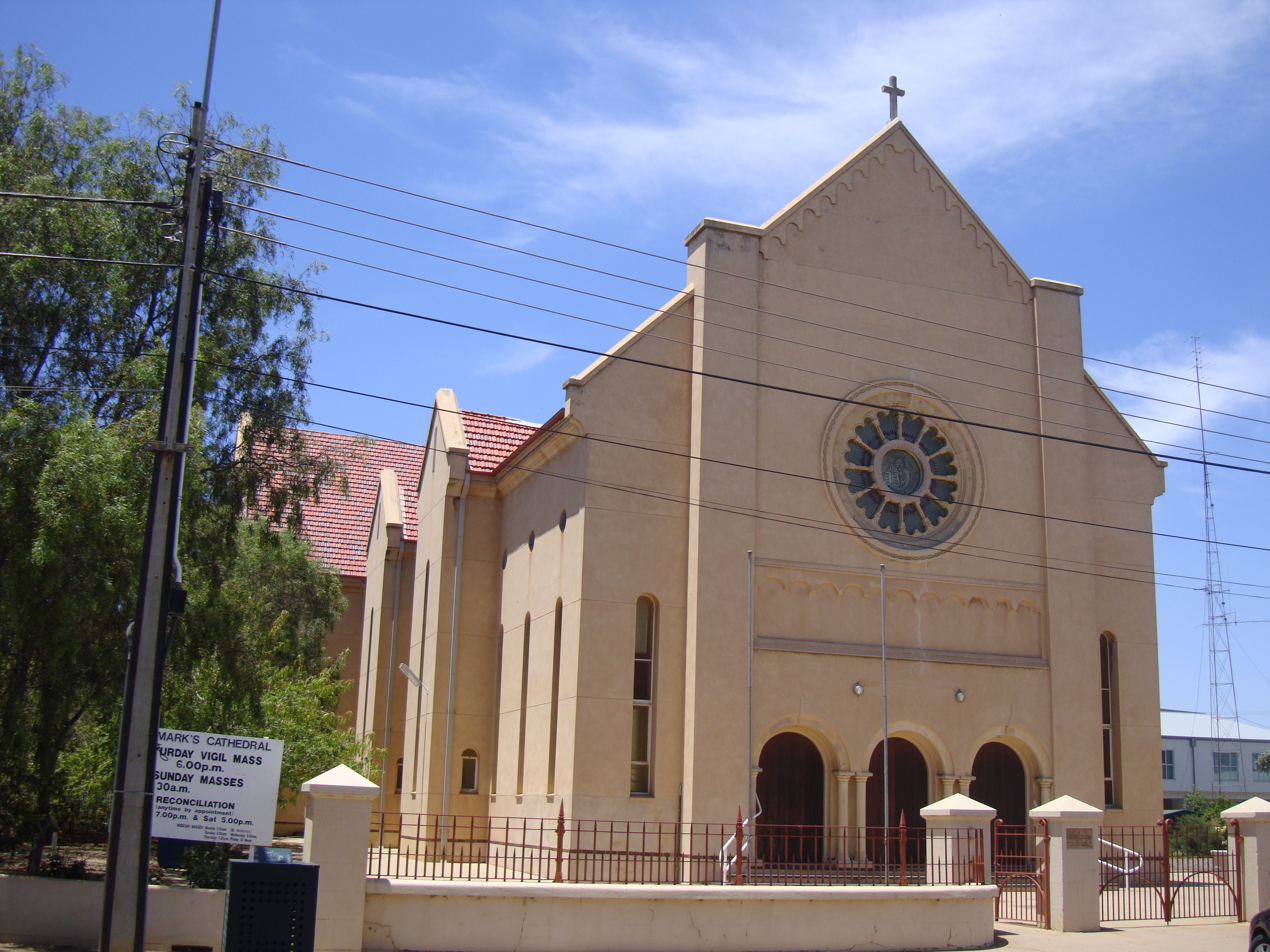
- St Mark's Cathedral
- Location: Port Pirie, South Australia
- Country: Australia
- Denomination: Catholic Church

History
- Status: Cathedral
- Founded: 9 July 1882
- Consecrated: 1887

Administration
- Diocese: Port Pirie

St Mark's Cathedral is the main place of Roman Catholic worship in the city of Port Pirie, Australia and is the seat of the bishop of the Diocese of Port Pirie (Dioecesis Portus Piriensis).

The church was inaugurated on 9 July 1882, with the design of architect C. Polain, of Napperby, and was elevated to the dignity of a cathedral in 1887. The church was destroyed by fire on 21 October 1947. The newly restored cathedral was reopened in 1953.

== See also ==
- Catholic Church in Australia
