= St Mary's Star of the Sea Cathedral, Darwin =

Church in Darwin, Northern Territory, Australia

St Mary's Star of the Sea Cathedral
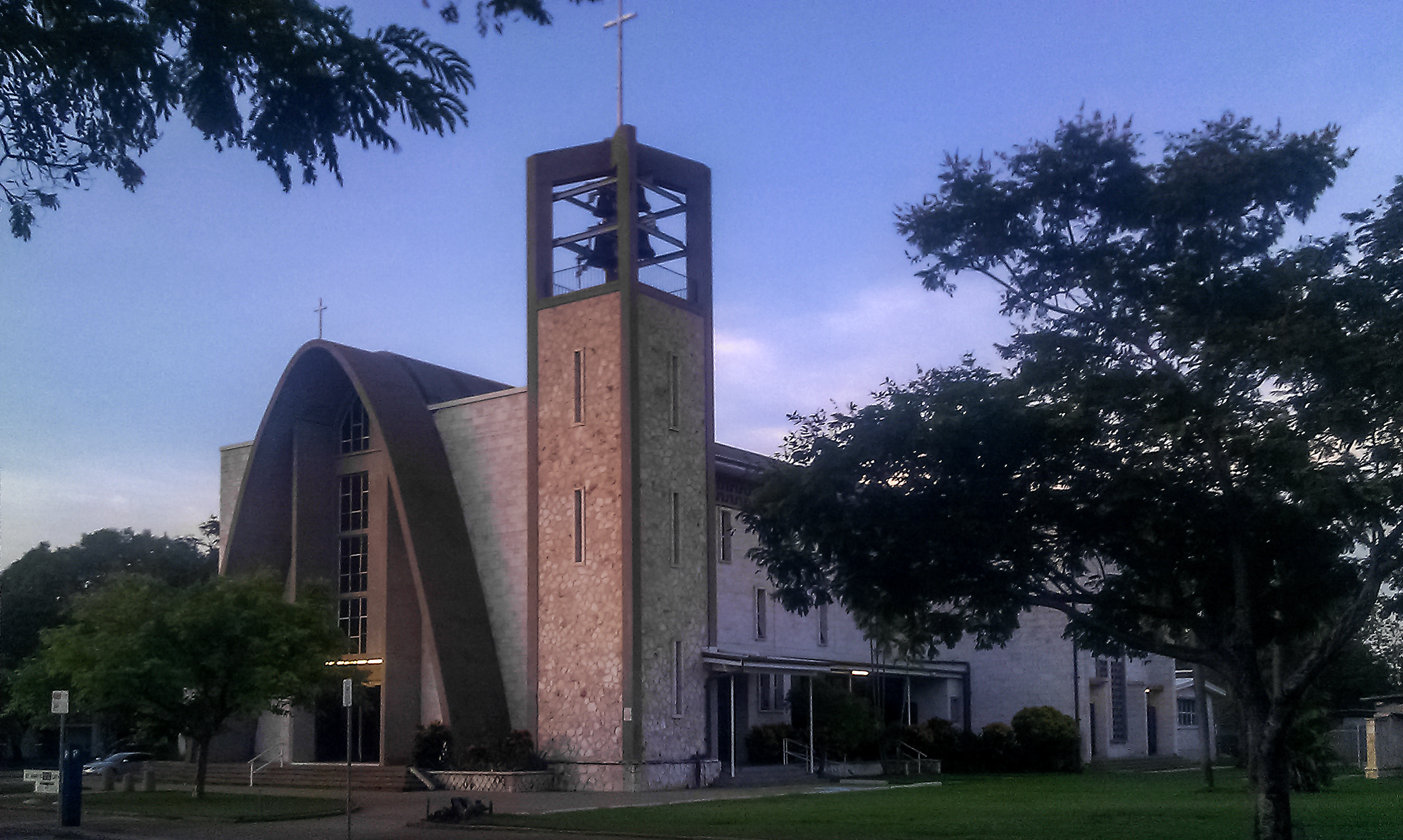
- St Mary's Star of the Sea Cathedral
- 12°27′33″S 130°50′18″E
- Location: Darwin
- Country: Australia
- Denomination: Roman Catholic Church

History
- Founder: Father Tom Jose Pandiapollil CMI

Administration
- Diocese: Diocese of Darwin

The St Mary's Star of the Sea Cathedral is the main place of Catholic worship in the city of Darwin, Australia, and the seat of the bishop of the Diocese of Darwin.

During World War II, the first church of St Mary was the seat of the garrison of the military chaplaincy for Australian troops in the city. After the war it became necessary to build a larger structure. The architect was Ian Ferrier, from Brisbane, who was employed by Donoghue Cusick & Edwards at the time, and this firm completed construction after his departure in 1957.

The first stone taken from Rum Jungle, the site of the first uranium mine in the territory, was blessed by Bishop O'Loughlin on 13 July 1958. Construction operations were entrusted to Carl Johansson until 1962 when he was replaced by John D'Arcy.

The cathedral was blessed and opened for worship by Bishop O'Loughlin on 19 August 1962 and consecrated on 20 August 1972.

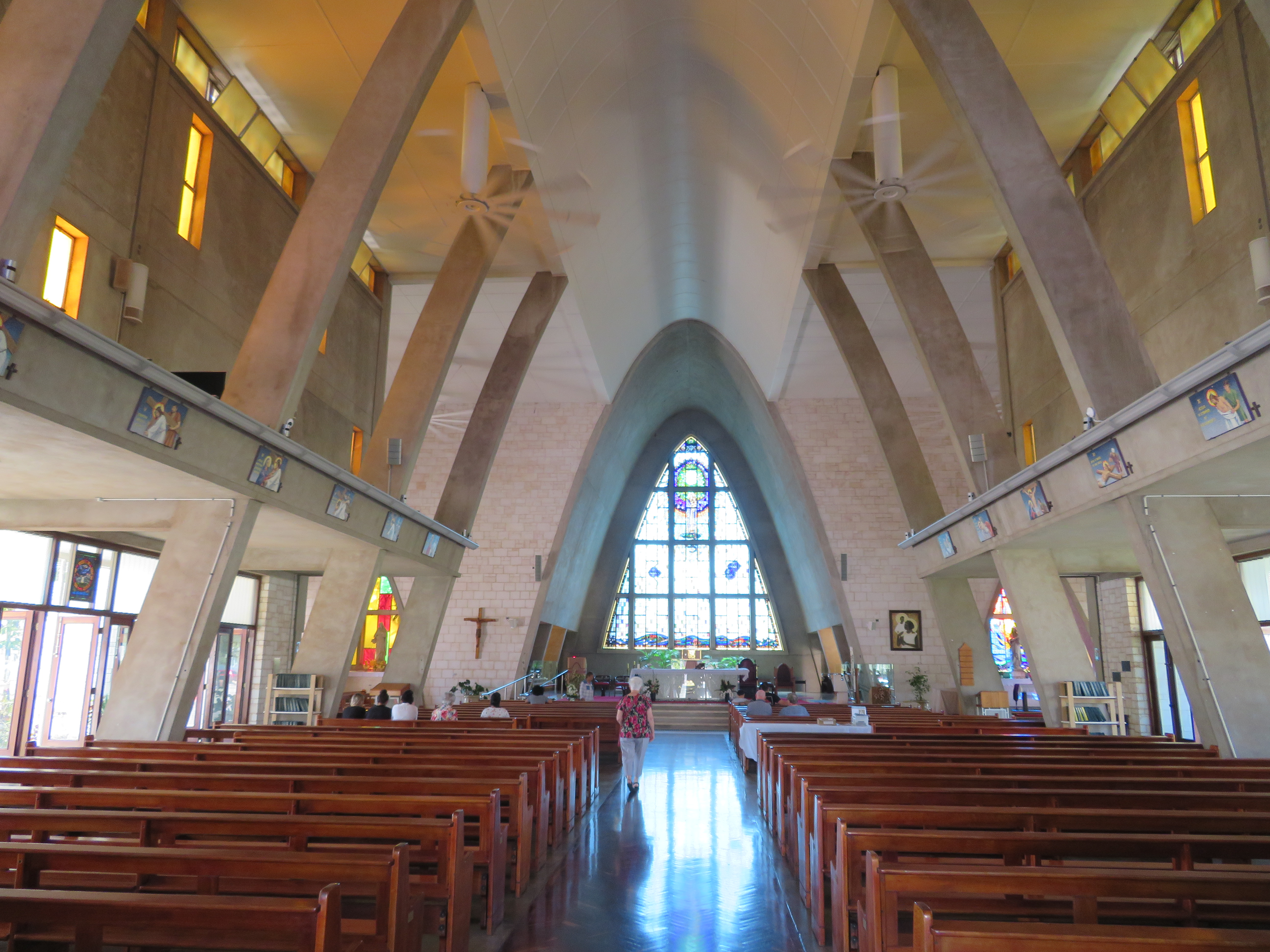
Interior of St Mary's Star of the Sea Cathedral

== See also ==
- Roman Catholicism in Australia
- St. Mary Cathedral (disambiguation)
