= Cathedral of St Michael and St John =

- Cathedral of Saints Michael and John
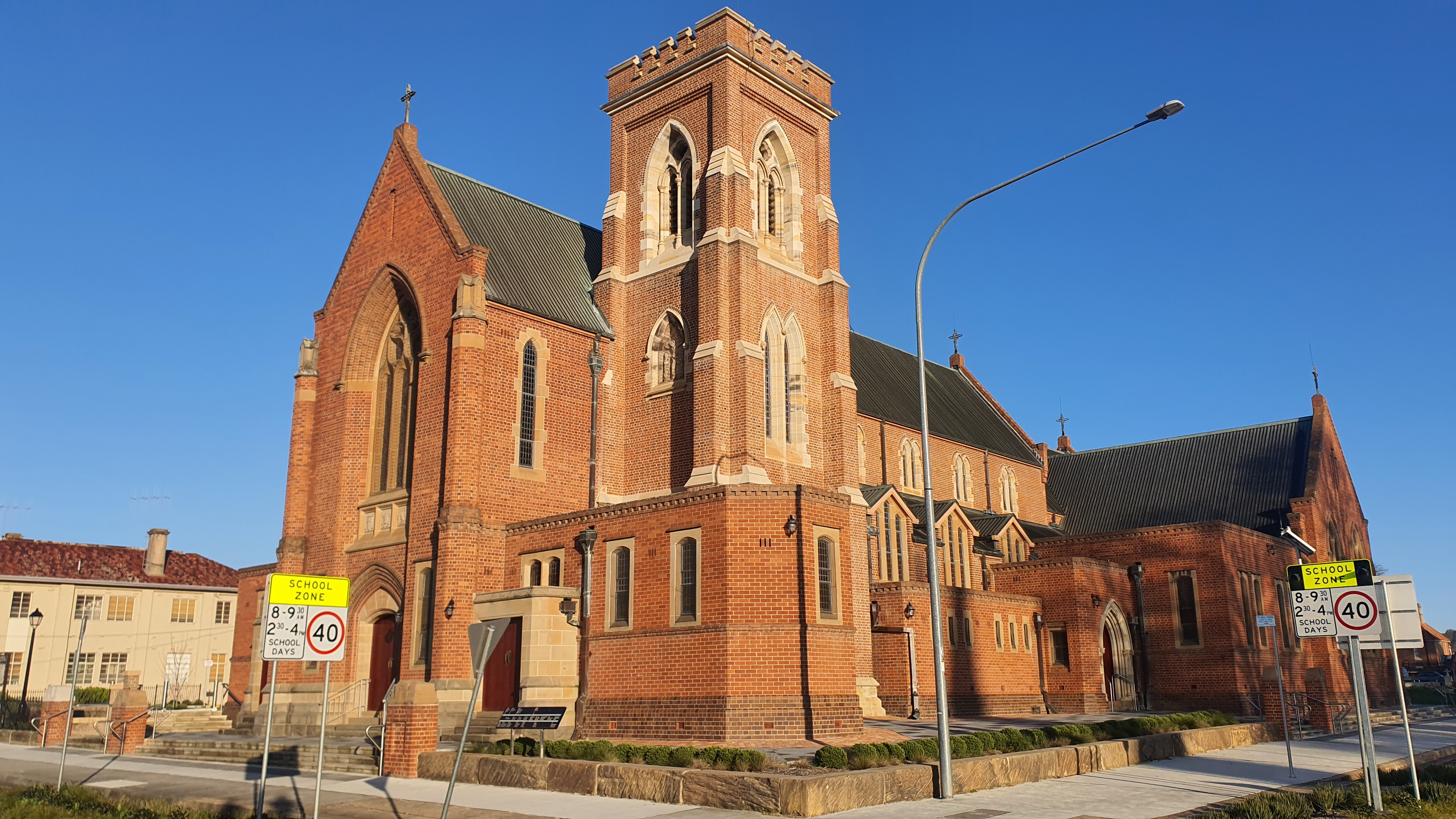
- Cathedral of St Michael and St John from Keppel Street and William Street intersection square view

- Location in New South Wales
- 33°25′12″S 149°34′37″E
- Location: 107 William Street, Bathurst, Bathurst Region, New South Wales
- Country: Australia
- Denomination: Catholic
- Website: www.cathedralparish.org.au

History
- Status: Cathedral
- Founded: 30 November 1857
- Founder: Bishop John Bede Polding
- Dedication: Saint Michael the Archangel; Saint John the Baptist
- Consecrated: 1865 by Bishop John Bede Polding

Architecture
- Functional status: Active
- Architect: Charles Hansom
- Architectural type: Victorian Gothic Revival
- Years built: 1857–1861

Specifications
- Materials: Sandstone; Red brick

Administration
- Diocese: Bathurst

Clergy
- Bishop: Most Rev. Michael McKenna
- Dean: Fr Paul Devitt

New South Wales Heritage Register
- Official name: Cathedral of Saints Michael and John
- Type: State heritage (built)
- Designated: 5 June 2012
- Reference no.: 1885
- Type: Cathedral
- Category: Religion
- Builders: Edward Gell

Cathedral of St Michael and St John is a heritage-listed Roman Catholic cathedral at 107 William Street, Bathurst, Bathurst Region, New South Wales, Australia. It was designed by Charles Hansom and built from 1857 to 1861 by Edward Gell. It is also known as Cathedral of Saints Michael and John. The cathedral is the episcopal see of the Roman Catholic Bishop of Bathurst. The property is owned by the Roman Catholic Diocese of Bathurst. It was added to the New South Wales State Heritage Register on 5 June 2012.

== History ==
=== Aboriginal people and colonisation ===
Aboriginal occupation of the Blue Mountains area dates back at least 12,000 years and appears to have intensified some 3000–4000 years ago. In pre-colonial times the area now known as Bathurst was inhabited by Aboriginal people of the Wiradjuri linguistic group. The clan associated with Bathurst occupied on a seasonal basis most of the Macquarie River area. They moved regularly in small groups but preferred the open land and used the waterways for a variety of food. There are numerous river flats where debris from recurrent camps accumulated over a long period. European settlement in this region after the first documented white expedition west of the Blue Mountains in 1813 was tentative because of apprehensions about resistance from Aboriginal people. There was some contact, witnessed by sporadic hostility and by the quantity of surviving artefacts manufactured by the Aborigines from European glass. By 1840 there was widespread dislocation of Aboriginal culture, aggravated after 1850 by the goldrush to the region.

Prior to European settlement in Australia, the Wiradjuri Aboriginal group lived in the upper Macquarie Valley. Bathurst was proclaimed a town by Lachlan Macquarie on 7 May 1815, named after Lord Bathurst, Principal Secretary of State for the Colonies. Bathurst is Australia's oldest inland township.

=== Bathurst ===
Governor Macquarie chose the site of the future town of Bathurst on 7 May 1815 during his tour over the Blue Mountains, on the road already completed by convict labour supervised by William Cox. Macquarie marked out the boundaries near the depot established by surveyor George Evans and reserved a site for a government house and domain. Reluctant to open the rich Bathurst Plains to a large settlement, Macquarie authorised few grants there initially, one of the first being 405 hectares (1,000 acres) to William Lawson, one of the three European explorers who crossed the mountains in 1813. The road-maker William Cox was another early grantee but later had to move his establishment to Kelso on the non-government side of the Macquarie River.

A modest release of land in February 1818 occurred when ten men were chosen to take up 20-hectare (50-acre) farms and 1-hectare (2-acre) town allotments across the river from the government buildings. When corruption by government supervisor Richard Lewis and acting Commandant William Cox caused their dismissal, they were replaced by Lieutenant William Lawson who became Commandant of the settlement in 1818.

Macquarie continued to restrict Bathurst settlement and reserved all land on the south side of the Macquarie River for government buildings and stock, a situation that prevailed until 1826. In December 1819 Bathurst had a population of only 120 people in 30 houses, two thirds being in the township of Kelso on the eastern side of the river and the remainder scattered on rural landholdings nearby. The official report in 1820 numbered Bathurst settlers at 114, including only 14 women and 15 children. The government buildings comprised a brick house for the commandant, brick barracks for the military detachment and houses for the stock keeper, and log houses for the 50 convicts who worked the government farm. Never successful, the government farm was closed by Governor Darling in 1828.

Governor Darling, arriving in Sydney in 1825, promptly commenced a review of colonial administration and subsequently introduced vigorous reforms. On advice from Viscount Goderich, Darling divided colonial expenditure into two parts: one to cover civil administration, funded by New South Wales; the other for the convict system, funded by Britain.

By this time, J. McBrien and Robert Hoddle had surveyed the existing grants in the vicinity. Surveyor James Bym Richards began work on the south side of the river in 1826. But the town was apparently designed by Thomas Mitchell in 1830 and did not open until late 1833 after Richards had completed the layout of the streets with their two-road allotments. The first sales were held in 1831 before the survey was complete.

In 1832 the new governor, Major General Sir Richard Bourke, visited Bathurst in October. He instructed the surveyor general, Major Thomas L. Mitchell, to make arrangements for "opening the town of Bathurst without delay" and he in turn instructed the Assistant Surveyor at Bathurst J. B. Richards to lay out the blocks and streets. This was done in September 1833. It is believed that Major Mitchell named the streets, with George Street being named after King George III.

=== Catholic Mass in Bathurst ===
The first Mass held in Bathurst was performed some time between 30 October 1830 and 2 November 1830. The Reverend John Therry (1794–1877) travelled inland from Sydney to minister to a group of "convicts about to be executed at Bathurst". Sloman surmised that at this time there may have been 120 to 130 Catholics in the region "who had not seen a priest for two to three years or longer". During his visit Therry baptised an infant daughter of Michael and Susan Keenan.

By 1839 the number of Roman Catholics in communion at Bathurst had increased to 300. In that year work commenced on a permanent church building located on the corner of George and Keppel Streets. St Michael's Church was a Victorian Gothic style building constructed in brick. It was in use by 1841 but appears not to have been completed until 1846 when leadlight windows were installed.

Bishop John Bede Polding (1794–1877), first Catholic Archbishop of Sydney, was interested in fostering the English Gothic style of architecture in his diocese. He arranged for plans for significant churches to be prepared by English architects including William Wardell (1823–1899) who was responsible for the design of St Mary's Cathedral in Sydney. In 1852 Polding brought to Bathurst a plan for a large church that had been prepared by English architect Charles Hansom. It is apparent that this plan became the basis of discussions regarding the construction of a new Roman Catholic church in Bathurst.

Fundraising for a new church commenced in 1854 after "a meeting called by Dean Grant to consider various matters concerning the parish". By September 1856 plans and specifications for the new building had been prepared by Hansom. These were amended prior to commencement of construction. On 30 November 1857 a foundation stone was laid by Bishop Polding.

Fundraising continued over many years and included some significant events. Among these was a bazaar held over several days from 19 September 1859. This bazaar raised between £1,400 and £1,500. By 1 January 1860 "£7,324/10/9 had been subscribed and Dean Grant estimated that £3,000 was needed to complete the building". Structural stone work was undertaken by Mr McEwen using stone quarried at Mount Lambie. Carving of corbels and other decorative stone details was done by Edward Gell. Brickwork was erected by Messrs Simonds and Nixon, and carpentry executed by Messrs Kerr and Rae.

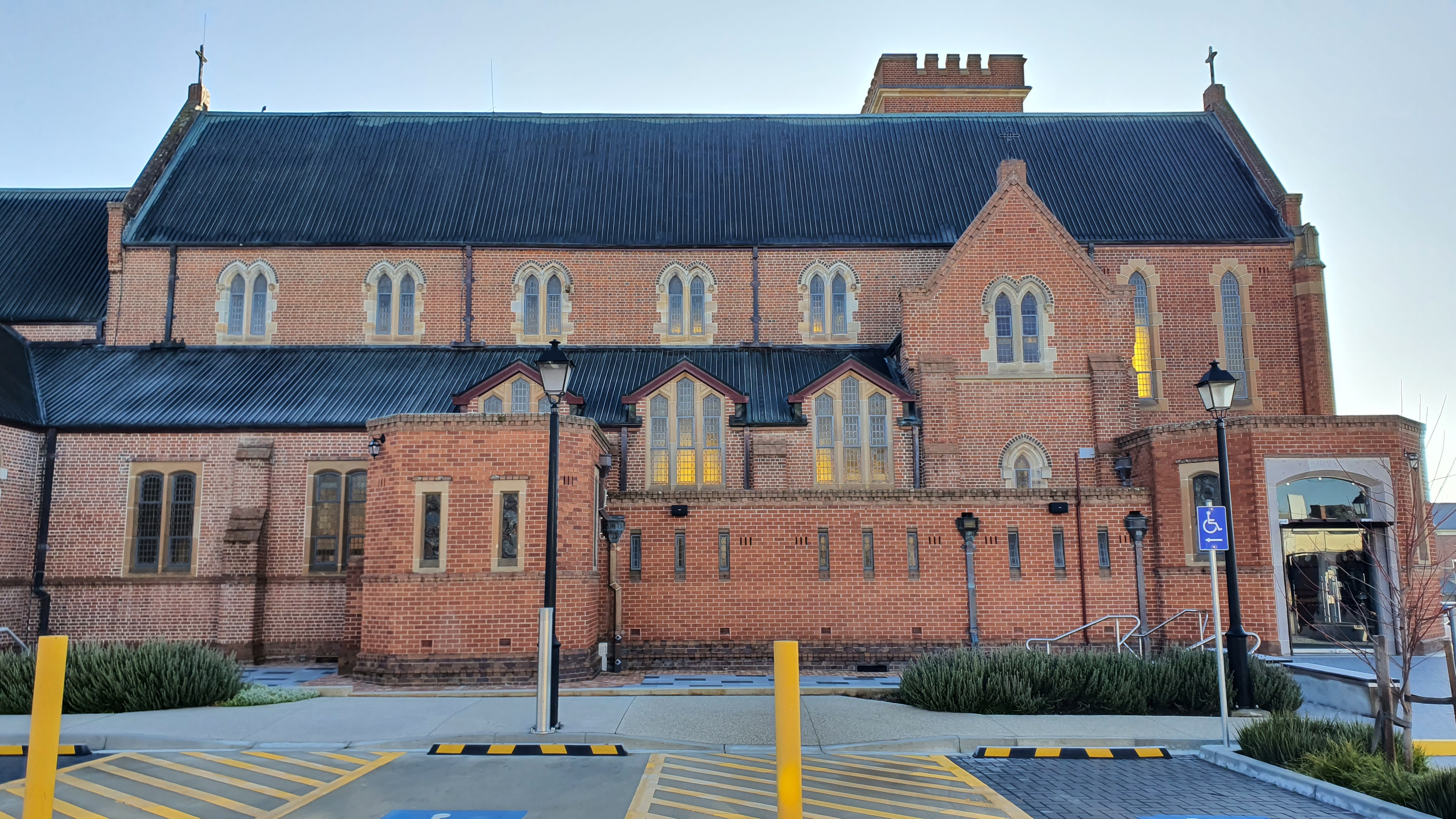

Construction of the church was almost complete by the end of 1860 and a dedication ceremony was planned for 11 April 1861. The dedication was to be undertaken by Archbishop Polding, however the Archbishop was unable to reach Bathurst by this date. The ceremony was conducted by Father Phelan and Dean Grant. The sermon on this occasion was preached by Father Patrick O'Farrell of Peel. The Archbishop eventually dedicated the cathedral on 29 June 1865.

Theo Barker noted that Dean Grant wished to have the cathedral dedicated to Saint John the Baptist. The parish name Saint Michael the Archangel could not be removed from the new church so it was dedicated in the name of both Saints. The last Sunday service was held in the old church of St Michael in April 1861.

The Very Reverend John Grant, Dean of Bathurst, died on 25 February 1864 at the age of 48. His body was interred in the Cathedral of Saints Michael and John, in a vault beneath the southern side of the archway separating the nave from the chancel/sanctuary. The Catholic Young Men's Society arranged for a block of black marble to be laid on top of the vault. This block is ornately inlaid with a stylized Calvary Cross decorated with roses and bordered with an inscription to the memory of Dean Grant in Fraktur or Gothic script.

On the opposite side of the archway is a vault containing the remains of the Very Reverend Dr. Matthew Quinn (1821–1885), first Bishop of Bathurst. This vault is topped with a block of white marble decorated with a simple Roman Cross and Latin inscription.

According to Bathurst historian Theo Barker the second Bishop of Bathurst, the Very Reverend Dr. Joseph Byrne made special arrangements with his vicar-general, Reverend Dr. John Dunne, about the way that he was to be interred. Byrne wished to be buried among his people, not in the cathedral, and to revive the old practice of offering special prayers for the souls of the dead at appropriate places in burial grounds.

Byrne arranged for a mortuary chapel to be constructed in the Catholic section of the Bathurst General Cemetery. This chapel was to be a tomb for the clergy and a venue for the celebration of mass within the cemetery. The chapel had not been completed by the time of Bishop Byrne's death on 12 January 1901 and his body was interred temporarily within the Meagher Family vault. The foundation stone of the chapel was blessed by Father John Dunne on 5 May 1901. Dunne was consecrated at Bishop of Bathurst on 8 September 1901 and one of his first duties in this role "was to bless the completed mortuary chapel and re-inter" Bishop Byrne's remains on 15 September.

The three Bishops who followed Dr. Byrne were interred in the mortuary chapel at the cemetery. They were Bishop John Dunne who died on 22 August 1919, Bishop Michael O'Farrell who died on 3 April 1928 and Bishop John Henry Norton who died on 20 June 1963. In planning extensions to the Cathedral of SS. Michael and John Bishop Norton envisaged a mortuary chapel located on the northern side of the new foyer. This chapel was intended to be a place in which high ranking clergy could lie pending their interment in the mortuary chapel at the cemetery. Prior to the death of Bishop Albert Reuben Edward Thomas on 24 September 1983 it was decided to inter his remains and those of the former bishops interred at the cemetery in the cathedral's mortuary chapel. Heavy duty steel shelving was installed in the mortuary chapel and the remains of all bishops other than Dr. Quinn were relocated to this place.

After his consecration as Bishop of Bathurst in 1865 the Reverend Matthew Quinn invited members of the Sisters of Mercy to accompany him to Australia. Seven sisters of the order accompanied the Bishop on his voyage from Ireland in July 1866. On arrival in Bathurst they were accommodated in a small cottage in George Street. Realising the sisters' need for larger quarters Bishop Quinn vacated his residence at the Deanery in Keppel Street and offered this building to them. In February 1868 he called a meeting of clergy and parishioners to plan for the construction of "a convent and scholastic buildings". The Convent of the Immaculate Conception of Mary, designed by Edward Gell, was constructed beside the cathedral. It was later linked to the cathedral through the construction of a nuns' chancel. This chancel is now the Blessed Sacrament Chapel. Archaeology relating to the convent and original "scholastic buildings", i.e. St Mary's College and the Convent lie within the curtilage of the State heritage listing of the Cathedral under the carpark tarmac.

The Sisters of Mercy taught at the original St Mary's College and went on to establish the St Joseph's Orphanage and provide teaching services to St Philomena's Primary School in South Bathurst. The running of Catholic Schools by religious orders was a relatively new development in the Catholic education system at the time. Previously Catholic schools were set up by Parish Priests and lay teachers taught in them. The establishment of congregation run schools became the model for the Catholic education system in NSW and remained so until late in the 20th century. The St Mary's College was one of the earliest congregational run Catholic Schools west of the Great Dividing Range.

In 1873 the Sisters of Mercy bought the former home of the Dargin family which was located on the southern side of the cathedral. The Dargin family were early settlers in the Bathurst area. The house was constructed in the 1850s or 1860s and served as a "townhouse" for John Dargin Senior and then his son William. On purchasing the building the Sisters offered it to Bishop Quinn as a residence and he lived there until his death in 1885. Subsequent Bishops used the building as a residence until 1903 when a new Presbytery was finished in Keppel Street. The sisters then relocated the primary and infants school from St Mary's College to the former Dargin residence using the upper floor for primary school classes and the lower floor for infants.

In 1935 the Sisters arranged for the St Mary's Primary School to be enlarged and significantly remodelled to provide school accommodation that was to the standard of the day "opening every part of the building to air and sun, to provide cross ventilation, natural lighting and a suitable temperature, and to ensure the ease of supervision and economy of working." (The Bathurst Advocate 1935). In the process the building, with the exception of the front facade that had been enclosed while used as a residence for the Bishop, was rebuilt using reinforced concrete. This material was chosen in an attempt to prevent the serious structural cracking of walls caused by the mevement of the clay soils on which it stood. The entire building was rendered in a stucco finish and displayed the characteristics of the Inter-War Free classical style. The building was used as a school until 1977.

In the 1890s plans were implemented for the construction of a new chancel at the western end of the cathedral. This replaced the original small chancel and was constructed in the style familiar to Irish Catholics. At the same time a grand high altar was ordered for placement in the new structure. The high altar was built by J. Pearce, ecclesiastical sculptor of Dublin (Catholic Diocese of Bathurst). It was dedicated on 3 February 1897 by the Most Reverend Joseph Byrne assisted by the Reverend J. Flanagan and the Reverend Stanislaus H. McGee. Relics of Saints Laurence and Vincent were placed in the altar which was dedicated in honour of the Sacred Heart of Jesus in memory of Saints Michael and John. The grand stained glass windows in the chancel were dedicated to the memory of the Right Reverend Michael Quinn, first Bishop of Bathurst.

During the episcopate of the Right Reverend Michael O'Farrell (1920–1928) Sydney Architect W. J. Gilroy was engaged to design a Sacristy to serve as a storage area for ritual items and vestments, and as a robing room. This building was constructed in the corner between the Chancel and the present Blessed Sacrament Chapel. It was constructed in 1922.

After the death of former Prime Minister Ben Chifley on Wednesday 13 June 1951 the casket containing his body was laid in state in King's Hall, Parliament House, Canberra on 15 June. After prayers were read Chifley's body was conveyed to Fairbairn Air Station on a gun carriage. It was then transported by aeroplane to Bathurst where it was taken to the Cathedral of SS. Michael and John. "The coffin lay before the high altar in the Cathedral and friends kept vigil in turns until Sunday." A State funeral was held in the cathedral on the afternoon of Sunday 17 June. Among the mourners at the funeral were Chifley's wife Elizabeth, Governor General Sir William McKell, who attended at the personal request of King George VI, Prime Minister Robert Menzies and his cabinet, State Premiers, senior judges and public servants. Also attending were hundreds of people from the Bathurst district and many of his former railway colleagues. Following the simple funeral service, conducted without eulogies, the large funeral cortege passed through Bathurst and out to the cemetery on Memorial Drive.

Discussion regarding substantial extensions and modifications to the Cathedral commenced in the period leading up to the building's centenary. In January 1956 Sydney-based architects Edward R. Green & Sons prepared two plans for the extension of the cathedral, including modification of the arch between the Nave and Sanctuary to open the view between the two spaces, construction of an annexe on northern side, North East Transept, Our Lady's Shrine, new confessionals, new east & north porches, a small door for children on the southern side of Nave, a new Narthex including war memorial plaques. Construction of a gallery above the new Narthex and development of a Baptistery in the base of the tower.

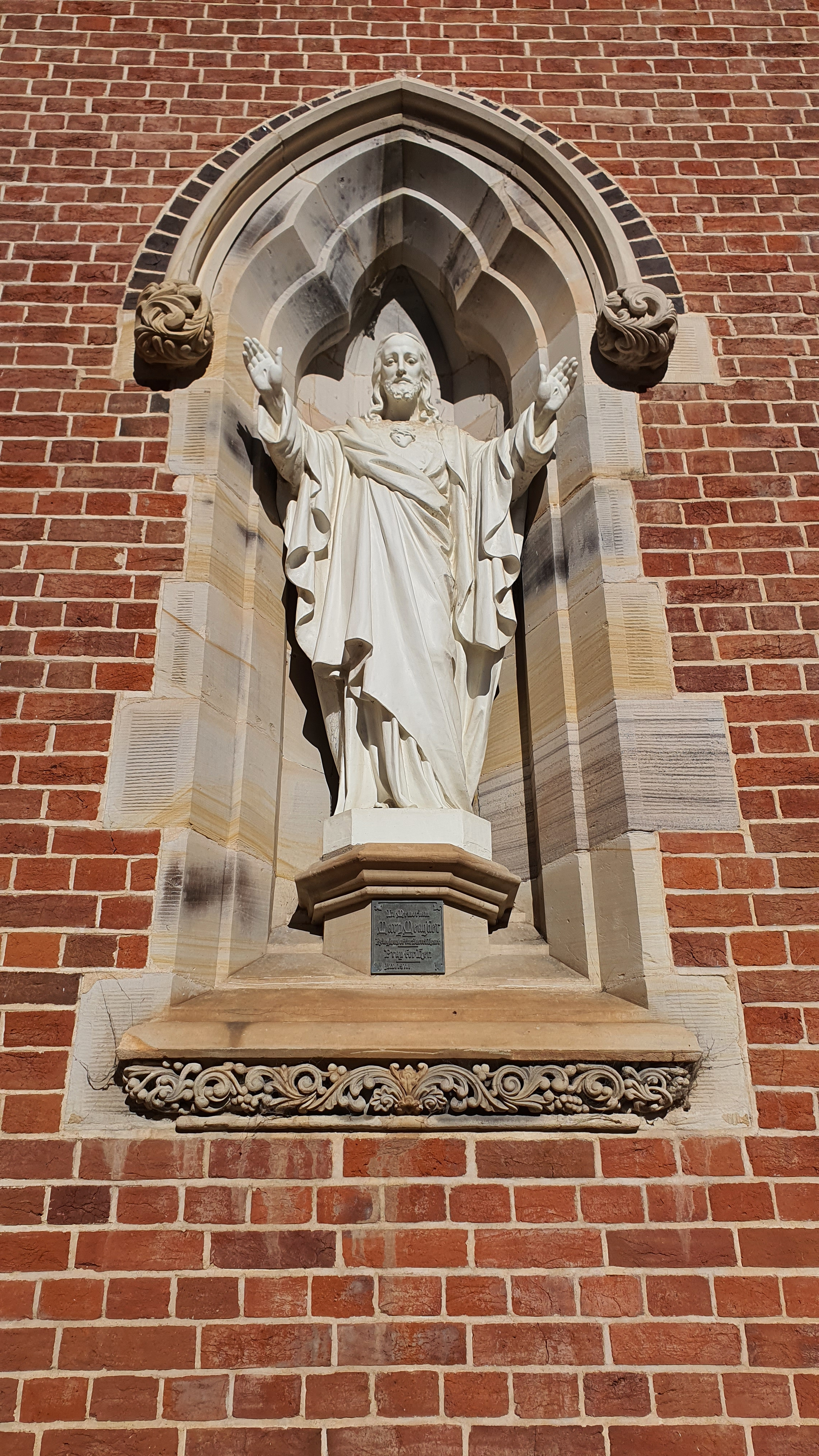
Statue of Jesus

These plans provided two alternatives for the size and location of the Narthex to be added to the William Street frontage of the building. The original plan was modified in 1957 and between then and 1960 various options were considered. It appears that during this time the possibility of construction of a spire was discussed. Plans for a mortuary chapel were also included in deliberations. A final plan appears to have been agreed on in mid 1960.

During 1961 Edward R. Green & Sons began developing detailed drawings for specific aspects of the new building work. The archives of the Catholic Diocese of Bathurst include detailed drawings for alterations to the cathedral, underpinning and stabilising the Sanctuary arch following removal of the wings from the columns either side, installation of gas pipe work and heaters in accordance with the requirements of the Bathurst Gas Authority.

All of these plans were prepared in April 1961. A subsequent set of plans, prepared in May 1962 in conjunction with R. Crooke, Mitchell & Peacock Consulting Engineers, details the new footings beneath the arches supporting the Sanctuary arch, temporary pinning to support the arch and structural details of the arch support beam. The cathedral extensions were consecrated by Bishop Norton on 23 August 1962 and "restored to public worship" by Cardinal Gilroy on 26 August (Catholic Diocese of Bathurst).

A substantial collection of plans held in the Diocesan archives indicates a vigorous discussion occurring during the time Bishop Albert Thomas in the mid to late 1970s and early 1980s. Significantly these concerned alterations to the layout of the Sanctuary and High Altar, extension of the Sacristy, and the possibility of establishing a burial crypt within the cathedral. During this time various options were also considered for the erection of public toilets within the Cathedral building.

Alterations to the sanctuary were first considered in 1971 with plans being prepared by architects Sydney G. Hurst & Kennedy Pty Ltd in July that year. Over the next decade various alternatives were considered and by 1980 the arrangement currently in place had been agreed upon. Detailed plans were also prepared for the separation of the mensa from the retable of the high altar to create an altar that could be moved closer to the Nave. A new front was also planned for the remnant of the high altar. Complete removal of the high altar was also considered with plans being prepared for relocation of the tabernacle into a niche within the western wall of the former nuns' chancel.

At various times during the 1970s the possibility of extending the Sacristy into the Blessed Sacrament Chapel was also considered. These considerations appear to have accompanied plans for the development of a public toilet in the western side of the Sacristy. The construction of public toilets on the outside of the western wall of the Sanctuary was also considered. These toilets were eventually installed within the section of the southern confessionals previously damaged by fire in 1979.

As Bishop Albert Thomas began considering the possibility of extending the Sanctuary to bring the altar closer to the Nave options for extending the Sanctuary forward of the Sanctuary arch became a possibility. Extension of this kind would cover the vaults of Dean Grant and Bishop Matthew Quinn who were interred in the space beneath the arch. By 1976 the possibility of establishing a burial crypt beneath the north transept was included in plans prepared by architects Sydney G. Hurst & Kennedy Pty Ltd. It is presumed that the establishment of this crypt would have allowed for the relocation of the remains and memorials of both Dean Grant and Bishop Quinn.

Bishop Thomas appears to have become attracted to the idea of interment of his remains within the cathedral, and to the possibility of relocating the remains of Bishops Byrne, Dunne, O'Farrell and Norton to the same place. By 1979 plans had focused on the conversion of the Mortuary Chapel erected by Bishop Norton into a crypt. Final plans for the conversion of this space, including the installation of steel shelving with terrazzo shelves to carry up to 12 caskets, were prepared in December 1980. These drawings included plans for new panelled doors intended to secure the space and to carry the arms of deceased Bishops interred within the crypt. The plans were signed off by builders F.H. & I.H. Cunningham Pty Ltd on 12 June 1981.

Stone conservation works were undertaken in 2016, with stages 1 (tower) and 2 (Keppel Street facade) completed that year.

== Description ==
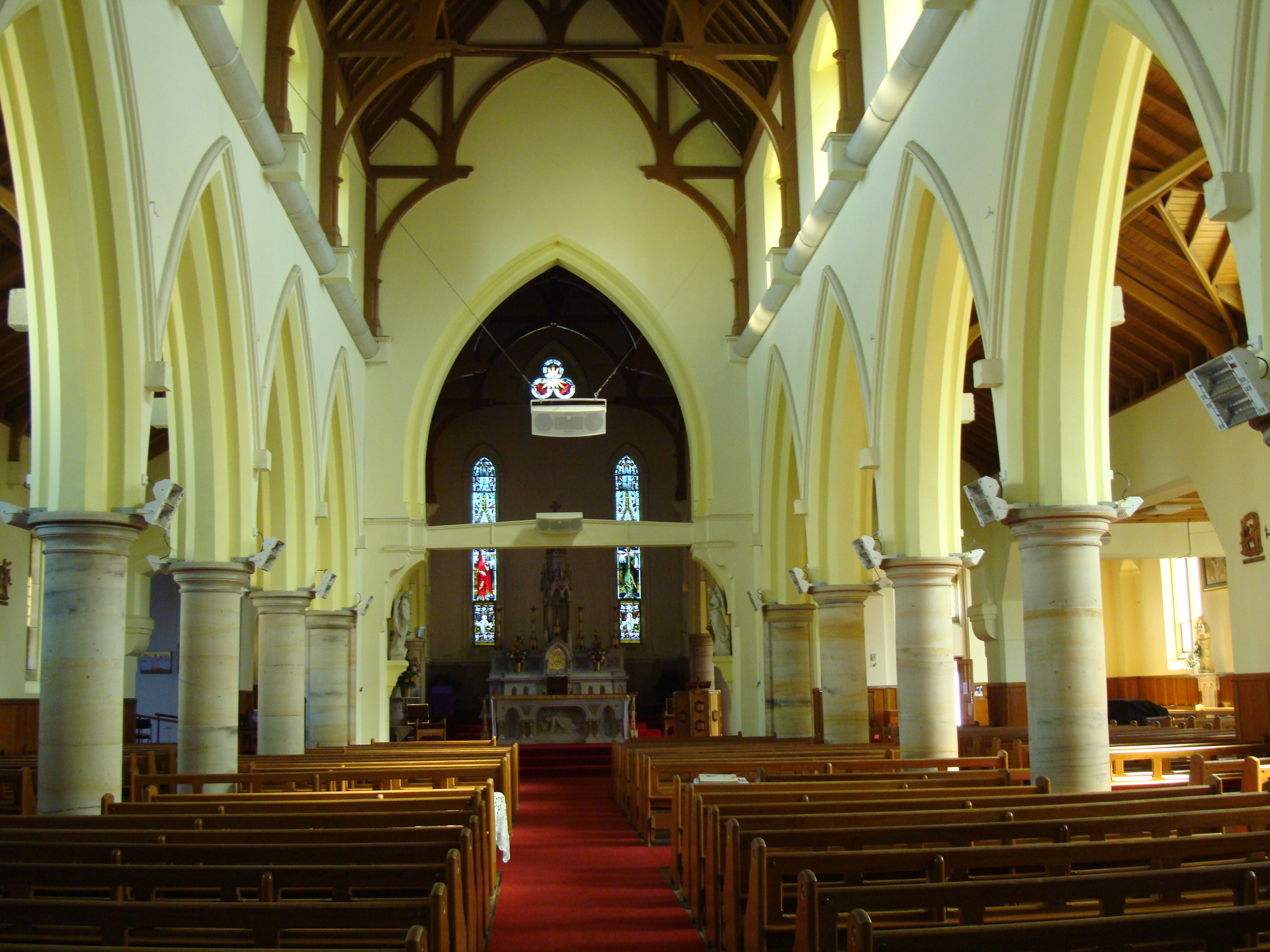
Cathedral interior, 2012

The original building was designed in a Gothic Revival style with Early English influences popular in England in the 1940s and reflecting English Catholic Liturgical practice, particularly evident in the work of renowned English architect Augustus Pugin (1812 - 1852). The cathedral was constructed in red brick with decorative stone coursing and mouldings from local Mount Lambie sandstone. Internally the Cathedral consists of an aisled nave with round sandstone columns and Gothic arches. The timber hammer-beamed trusses spring from corbels high on the walls to support the high open roof. The aisles are low with a high level clerestory and the Sanctuary and Chancel at the western end were substantially extended in the 1890s and 1960s. There are a number of fine stained glass windows from various periods. A high Nave and stained glass window above the gallery by John Hardman and Co dominate the western end. The brick and stone crenelated tower marks the original west end prior to the addition in the 1960s of a Narthex. The high spire proposed in the original drawings has yet to be completed. The exterior includes a number of finely carved stone mouldings, decorative bosses, gargoyles and carved heads to windows and doorways. After the Second Vatican Council some minor alterations also occurred to the sanctuary, altar and bishop's seat. The cathedral was constructed in five principal phases as follows: Cathedral during 1857 61, Chancel and North Transept in 1897, Blessed Sacrament Chapel in 1897, Sacristy in 1922, major extensions in 1962, and Altar modification in 1981. Subsequent modifications continued to use this style and adopt the same materials used for the original. Substantial extensions and modifications undertaken in 1961-62 were to commemorate its Centenary and were designed in the Post-War Ecclesiastical style to complement the original design.

The former St Mary's Primary School is a two-storey building built in a U shape, the front block containing 4 classrooms, a central hallway and stair and two parallel wings at the western end of the central hallway. Constructed in reinforced concrete the exterior is rendered in rusticated stucco with several architectural elements rendered in smooth stucco.

Elements of the front block are remnants of the original residence built on the site. These include the front brick walls the northern brick wall. elements of the southern brick wall and some sub floor elements including footings

The cathedral is generally in excellent condition structurally but there has been extensive deterioration of the relatively soft Mount Lambie sandstone used externally. There is also evidence of rising damp and salt attack, particularly in the south-west corner of the building with some inappropriate attempts at repairs in the past. Some of the damp issues relate to subfloor ventilation issues resulting from rising ground levels but also the use of later concrete slabs in later modifications. The former St Mary's Convent, demolished in the late 1970s, lies immediately to the south of the cathedral and the site of the original 1840s Catholic Church of Saint Michael, demolished in the 1870s, lies to the west of the cathedral.

The cathedral complex has a reasonably high degree of integrity despite the loss of the adjoining Convent in the 1970s and original Church in the 1870s. The 1880s Presbytery, on the corner of Keppel and George Streets now the Chancery Office, the 1930s Catholic is also an important element.

== Heritage listing ==
The Cathedral of Saints Michael and John, a notable example of British architect Charles Hansom's Victorian Gothic ecclesiastical architecture, is of state heritage significance for its historic values as the second cathedral to be established in the State. It was built to serve the third Catholic diocese established in NSW in 1865, the Diocese of Bathurst, which at the time, covered much of western and northern NSW. As such it represents the growth and spread of the Catholic Church in tandem with the expansion and settlement of the colony. The establishment of Bathurst Diocese and the cathedral was a significant step initiated by Bishop Polding to establish a strong hierarchical organisation for the Catholic Church in NSW and Australia. The cathedral has now been the spiritual and administrative focal point for Catholics in the central western region of NSW for over 150 years.

The State heritage significance of the item is enhanced through its association with noted British Architect Charles Hansom and stonemason and architect Edward Gell. It is also significant for its association with Bishop Polding, a leading figure in the establishment and development of the Catholic church in NSW and also with Bishop Matthew Quinn, architect of the Catholic Education system in Australia. His work in this regard between 1866 and 1885 was of great significance in establishing the cultural identity of Catholics here. Quinn lived in the future primary school between 1878 and his death in 1885.

The Cathedral of Saints Michael and John is of aesthetic significance at a State level as a good example of Charles Hansom's architectural design in the Victorian Gothic style, adapted to suit the Australian context. Edward Gell's architectural detailing in stone and brick is of high aesthetic significance and contributes to establishing the significant landmark qualities of the cathedral. The cathedral is an integral component of the city centre of Bathurst, the first inland settlement in NSW.

The cathedral has state level research values as it embodies not only the design aspirations of the architects and designers responsible for the original design drawing from 19th century traditions but also because it carries evidence of changes in function and liturgical practice from the mid -19th century to the late 20th century.

The Cathedral of Saints Michael and John is an early and rare example of a Roman Catholic Cathedral built in the 19th century and is representative of both the growth and development of the Catholic church in NSW during the 19th and 20th centuries and of the Victorian Gothic architectural style.

The extended State listing curtilage encompasses the former St Mary's Primary School to the south of the Cathedral which is significant for its important association with Bishop Matthew Quinn as it was his place of residence between 1873 and his death in 1885. This former school building also tells the significant story of the development of the Catholic education in NSW as it was one of the very early parochial Catholic school run by a religious order of sisters to be established west of the Great Dividing Range. The establishment of schools run by religious orders was the model that became the norm for Catholic educational system in NSW and Australia. The model followed a philosophy which viewed education as the 'transmission of values preparing children for life here and hereafter". As it is currently configured, the former school is significant as a representative example of the design and attributes of Catholic educational institutions in the early part of the 20th century.

Cathedral of Saints Michael and John was listed on the New South Wales State Heritage Register on 5 June 2012 having satisfied the following criteria.

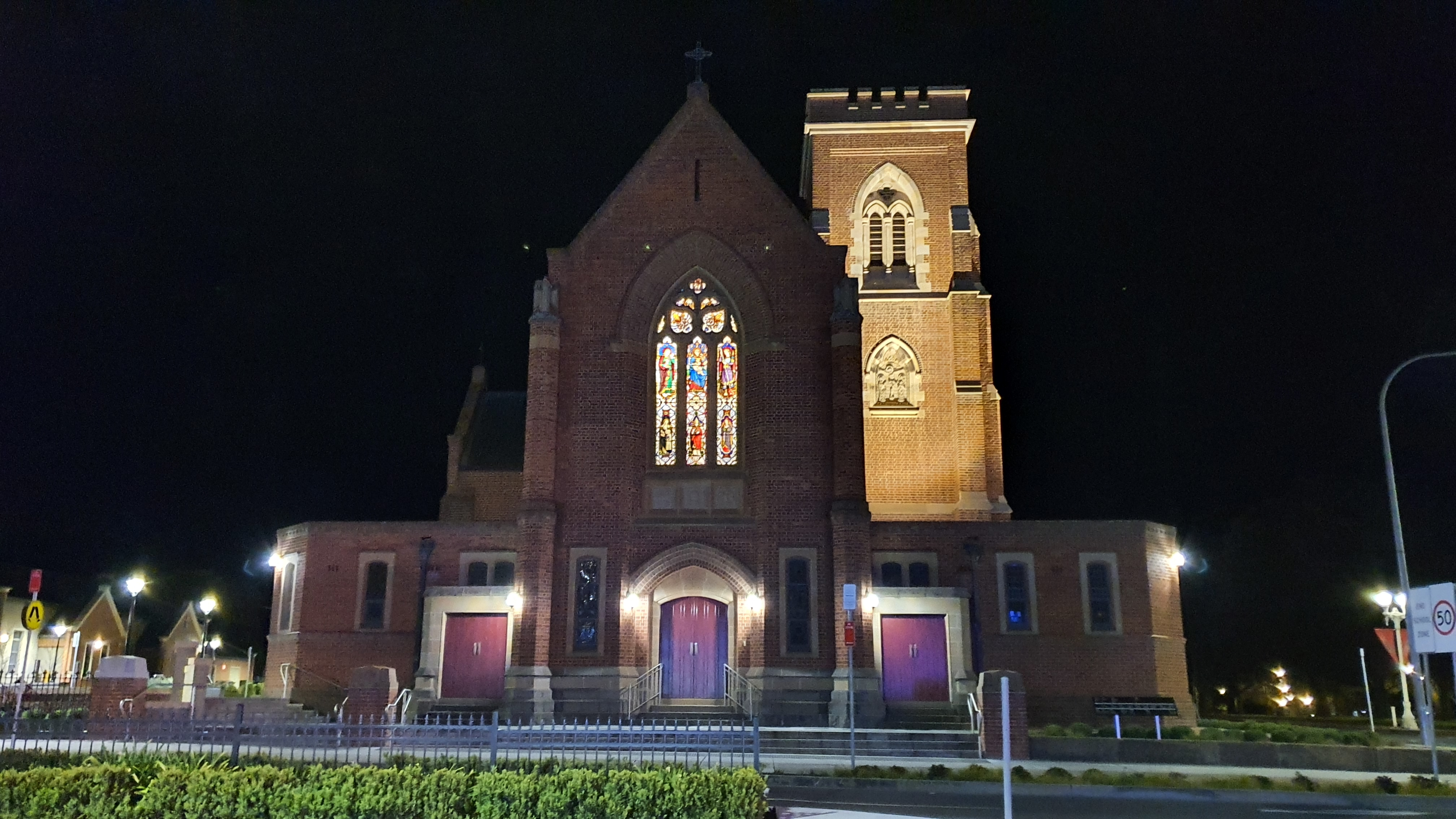
Cathedral at night

The place is important in demonstrating the course, or pattern, of cultural or natural history in New South Wales.

The Cathedral of Saints Michael and John is of State heritage significance for its historical values as the second Catholic Cathedral to be constructed in NSW. Its construction in 1861 and dedication as the diocesican cathedral in 1865 demonstrate the establishment of the Catholic Church thorough NSW in the mid 19th century in tandem with the growth and spread of settlement west of the Blue Mountains and throughout the State.

The cathedral's Victorian Gothic design, by British architect Charles Hansom, also demonstrates the early association, through the tastes of Dr Ullathorne and Bishop Polding, of the Australian Catholic Church with the Benedictine tradition of the British Catholic Church. The continued use and modification of the building through the 19th and 20th centuries reflects the mid 19th century replacement of the British Catholic clergy and traditions with the clergy and worship practices brought from Ireland to serve the needs of the largely Irish Catholic population of NSW.

The cathedral has now been the focal point for Catholics in the central western region of NSW for over 150 years.

The extended State Heritage Listing curtilage for the Cathedral includes the former St Mary's Primary School building which tells the important aspect of the story of the development of the Catholic education in NSW. In 1903 this building was established as an extension to the teaching facility the Sisters of Mercy set up in Bathurst in 1866. The Sisters school at Bathurst was one of the very early parochial Catholic schools run by a religious order of sisters to be established west of the Great Dividing Range. The establishment of schools run by religious orders was the model that became the norm for Catholic educational system in NSW and Australia. The model followed a philosophy which viewed education as the 'transmission of values preparing children for life here and hereafter" (The Advocate, Melbourne 3 April 1869).

The place has a strong or special association with a person, or group of persons, of importance of cultural or natural history of New South Wales's history.

The cathedral is of State heritage significance for its important association with noted British architect Charles Hansom who designed many lauded ecclesiastical buildings in England including St Osburgs Coventry, Woodchester Priory and the chapels at Clifton College. The cathedral has a direct association with Edward Gell who came to Australia from England to supervise the construction of the Cathedral of Saints Michael and John and was responsible for the fine stonework and architectural detailing. It was Gell's first Australian assignment and a good example of his early work here from which he progressed to design and construct noted Bathurst regional buildings such as St Stanislaus School.

The cathedral has several important association with figures central to the history of the Catholic Church in Australia. Bishop Polding, the first Archbishop of Sydney, was instrumental in the design of the Cathedral at Bathurst. In 1852 he had brought a set of drawings prepared by Hansom to Bathurst to encourage the construction of the fine Victorian Gothic style building. Polding dedicated the Cathedral in June 1865.

In addition the cathedral has a strong association with Bishop Matthew Quinn. Quinn was the first Bishop of Bathurst and was regarded during his time as a leader among the Bishops of NSW and was a prominent player in the establishment and development of the Catholic Education system. His work in this regard between 1866 and 1888 was of great significance in establishing the cultural identity of Catholics here and led to the establishment of religious orders of brothers and nuns a s the primary conduit for Catholic culture in NSW.

The extended State listing curtilage encompasses the former St Mary's Primary School to the south of the Cathedral which is significant for its important association with Bishop Matthew Quinn as it was his place of residence between 1873 and his death in 1885. .

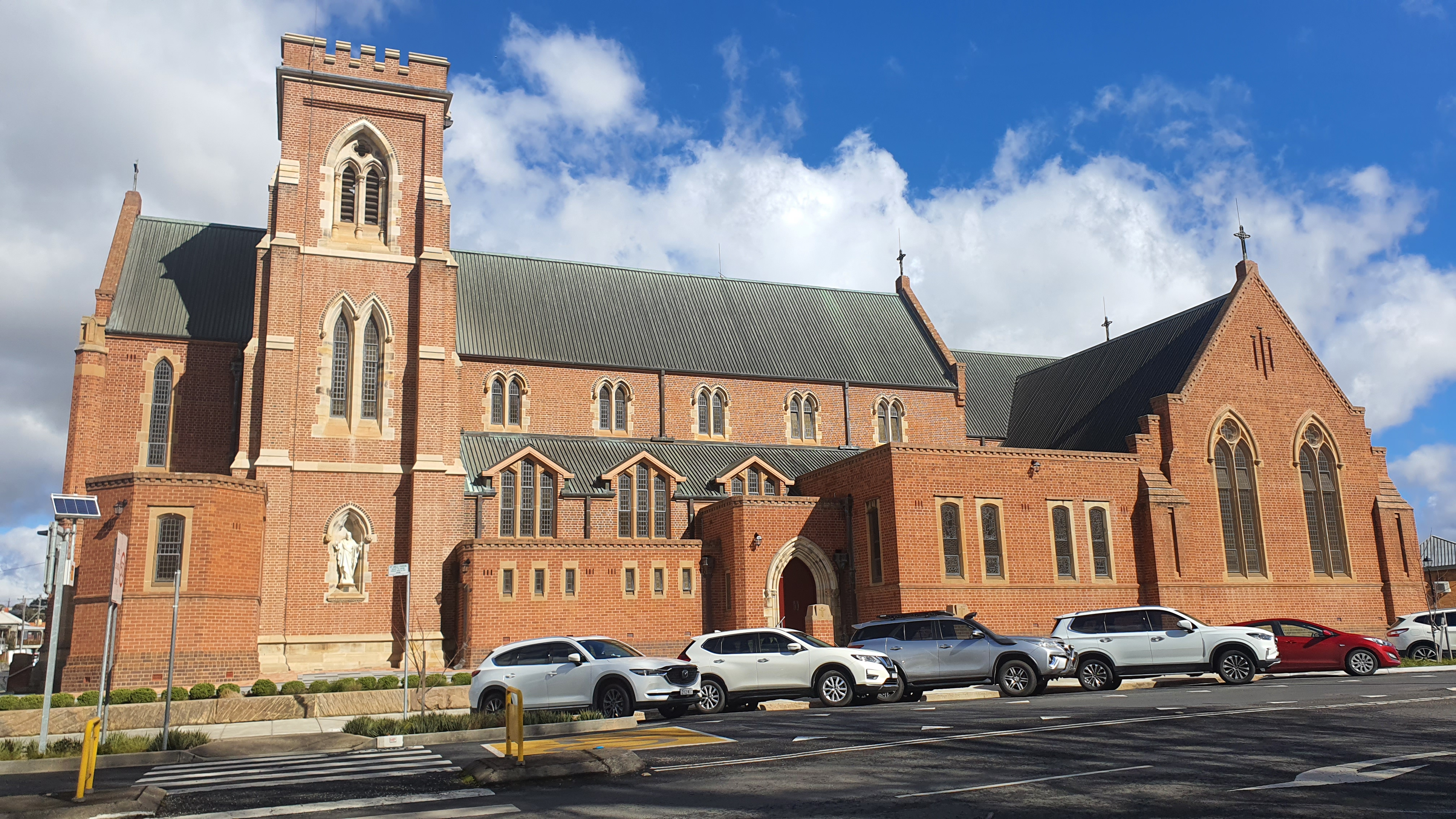

The place is important in demonstrating aesthetic characteristics and/or a high degree of creative or technical achievement in New South Wales.

The Cathedral of Saints Michael and John is of State heritage significance as a good example of Charles Hansom's architectural design in the Victorian Gothic style, adapted to suite the Australian context. It also demonstrates the early Australian Catholic Church preference for the Benedictine aesthetic of the Victorian Gothic style espoused by Pugin and later taken up by Hansom. The later modifications and additions are sensitively rendered and the consistent use of materials, sympathetic massing and architectural detail do not detract from the aesthetic significance of the item. Edward Gell's architectural detailing in stone and brick is of high aesthetic significance and contributes to establishing the cathedral's landmark qualities. The cathedral is an integral component of the centre of Bathurst, the first inland settlement in NSW. It makes a major contribution to the historic character of the centre of the town now recognised as an urban Conservation Area and stands prominently on two important commercial streets, William and Keppel. The aesthetic importance of the precinct is noted in the Register of the National Estate listing for the William Street Group which includes the Catholic Cathedral. The extended curtilage for the Cathedral contains the former St Mary's Primary School which in conjunction with the Cathedral makes a significant contribution to the historic streetscape of William Street.

The place has a strong or special association with a particular community or cultural group in New South Wales for social, cultural or spiritual reasons.

The Cathedral of Saints Michael and John is of significance as it was the spiritual and administrative centre of the church for the Catholic communities of Bathurst, Central West and NSW for over 150 years and remains of importance to these contemporary communities. The establishment of the 1842 Church of Saint Michael, the 1861 Church of Saints Michael and John and then its dedication as a Cathedral in 1865 were each significant events in the lives of the growing Catholic community in Australia in the mid-19th century.

The cathedral also serves as a parish church for the Bathurst community. The Bathurst diocese has 19 churches that are spread from Lithgow in the east to Dubbo in the west. Therefore, the cathedral also has specific social significance to the Catholic community within the Bathurst Parish.

The Cathedral precinct includes a number of associated buildings including the primary school founded in 1840, which is known as the Cathedral Primary School. This direct association between education and the cathedral is an important aspect which has social significance to the lives of the children who attend the school and their families.

The place has potential to yield information that will contribute to an understanding of the cultural or natural history of New South Wales.

The cathedral is of State heritage significance for its research potential as it embodies not only the design aspirations of the architects and designers responsible for the original design drawings from the 19th century but also because it carries evidence of changes in function and liturgical practice from the mid-19th century to the present. The cathedral precinct includes a number of other related buildings and sites of former buildings. These include the chancery, the parish office, the cathedral school, Centrecare Bathurst (formerly St Mary's Primary School) which illustrate the evolving function of the diocese. Sites of former buildings include those of St Mary's School and 1868 Convent and the first Catholic Church of St Michael built in 1842. These sites have the potential to provide a rich archaeological resource relating to Cathedral and its history of development.

The place possesses uncommon, rare or endangered aspects of the cultural or natural history of New South Wales.

The Cathedral of Saints Michael and John is a rare example of one of only four 19th-century cathedrals in NSW and is the second cathedral to be built in the colony.

The design of the building is one of only a few prepared by English architect Charles Hansom for use in Australia and notably modelled on St Osburg's Church in Coventry dating from the 1840s.

The place is important in demonstrating the principal characteristics of a class of cultural or natural places/environments in New South Wales.

The Cathedral of Saints Michael and John is representative example of a mid-19th-century Catholic cathedral which was established during a period of early settlement and population growth west of the Blue Mountains. Its growth and development as a building reflects its growth and change as tan important administrative and spiritual centre for the catholic population west of the mountains and in the greater west of NSW. As it is currently configured, the former St Mary's Primary School is significant as a representative example of the design and attributes of Catholic educational institutions in the early part of the 20th century.

== See also ==
- List of Roman Catholic cathedrals in New South Wales
