= MacKillop College, Bathurst =

MacKillop College

Location
- 25-31 Gormans Hill Road; Bathurst, New South Wales; 2795; Australia; 33°25′58″S 149°35′23″E

Information
- Former name: Diocesan Catholic Girls High School (pre-1995)
- Type: Independent secondary day
- Motto: Esto Mundi Lumen (With Mary's Help be a Light to the World)
- Religious affiliation: Catholic
- Patron saint: St Mary MacKillop
- Established: 1967
- Oversight: Roman Catholic Diocese of Bathurst
- Principal: Peter Halpin
- Staff: 29 (2025)
- Teaching staff: 59.1 FTE (2025)
- Grades: Year 7 to Year 12
- Gender: Girls
- Enrollment: 691 (2025)
- Campus type: Inner Regional
- Houses: Chisholm; MacKillop; Gilroy; McAuley
- Affiliation: Alliance of Girls' Schools Australasia
- Website: mackillopbathurst.catholic.edu.au

MacKillop College is an independent Roman Catholic secondary day school for girls located in Bathurst, New South Wales, Australia.

The college was established in 1967 as the Diocesan Catholic Girls' High School. The name change to MacKillop College was effected in1995.

== History ==
MacKillop College (then known as The Diocesan Catholic Girls High School) was opened in February 1967, as the result of efforts to coordinate secondary education of girls in Bathurst following the Wyndham Scheme.

Prior to 1967, the secondary education of girls in Bathurst was coordinated under the Sisters of Mercy at St Mary's College, beside the Cathedral of St Michael and St John, and the Sisters of St Joseph at Perthville.

The introduction and legislation of the changes educational changes recommended in Wyndham Report in 1961 posed significant changes to educational instruction in NSW, and challenges to the function of the two boarding colleges. The then Bishop of Bathurst, Albert Thomas, elected to overcome the deficiencies of the two Colleges by building a new College staffed by the two Religious Orders. The new school was opened by Cardinal Norman Gilroy on February 26, 1967.

The school decided to reconsider the name "Diocesan Catholic Girls High School" in 1994, as it was considered unspecific and unreflective of the school. The name was also no longer technically correct, as the school was by then a parish school, having become a part of the Bathurst Catholic Parish.

The name MacKillop was chosen in reference to St Mary MacKillop whose imminent beatification by Pope John Paul II was the source of significant news at the time. MacKillop had strong ties to the area through St Joseph's College at Perthville, which she visited and provided instruction to staff. Bishop Patrick Dougherty gave his permission for the name change on the school’s 28th birthday - February 26, 1995.

== Co-curriculum ==
=== Music ===
MacKillop offers music extra-curriculars in multiple music ensembles, including a concert band, and stage band.

=== Debating and Public Speaking ===
MacKillop College maintains intra-school debating options through the Robert Hannon-Burt public speaking competition, as well as a house based debating program. MacKillop College also participates in the CWA Public Speaking Competition, and the Lions Club Youth of the Year Competition.

== House system ==
MacKillop College features a established house system of four school houses.

- Chisholm, in reference to Caroline Chisholm, a English humanitarian known for her support of Australian family welfare.
- MacKillop, in reference to Mary McKillop, the first Australian Saint who was widely recognised for her support of schools and welfare institutions.
- Gilroy, in reference to Cardinal Gilroy, the first Australian-born cardinal of the Roman Catholic Church.
- McAuley, in reference to Catherine McAuley, the foundress of the Sisters of Mercy.

== See also ==
- List of Catholic schools in New South Wales
- List of boarding schools in Australia
- Catholic education in Australia
