= Diocese of Bathurst =

Diocese of Bathurst may refer to:

== Catholic Church ==
- Roman Catholic Diocese of Bathurst (Australia), in New South Wales, Australia
- Roman Catholic Diocese of Bathurst in Canada, in New Brunswick, Canada

== Anglican Communion ==
- Anglican Diocese of Bathurst, in New South Wales, Australia

== See also ==
- Bathurst (disambiguation)
