= Albert Reuben Edward Thomas =

The Most Reverend Albert Reuben Edward Thomas
- Bishop of Diocese of Bathurst
- Diocese: Bathurst
- Installed: 20 October 1963
- Term ended: 12 April 1983
- Predecessor: John Francis Norton
- Successor: Patrick Dougherty

Orders
- Ordination: 30 November 1931 at St Mary's Cathedral, Sydney by Bartolomeo Cattaneo
- Consecration: 20 October 1963 at St. Peter's Basilica by Pope Paul VI

Personal details
- Born: Albert Reuben Edward Thomas; 26 October 1908 Farnborough, Hampshire, United Kingdom
- Died: 24 September 1983 (aged 74) Wollstonecraft, New South Wales, Australia
- Denomination: Catholic Church
- Occupation: Catholic bishop
- Education: St Columba's College, Sringwood; St Patrick's Seminary, Manly
- Motto: Cui Servire Regnare Est ("To serve is to reign")

Albert Reuben Edward Thomas (26 October 1908 − 24 September 1983) was an English Australian Roman Catholic bishop, who served as Bishop of Bathurst for two decades.

== Early life ==
Thomas was born in Farnborough, Hampshire on 26 October 1908 and his family immigrated to Australia in 1911, settling in Camperdown, New South Wales. He was educated at St Joseph's College, Hunters Hill, before beginning studies for the priesthood at St Columba's College, Sringwood. He then proceeded to St Patrick's Seminary, Manly. His brother, William, would also become a priest.

== Priesthood ==
Thomas was ordained to the priesthood on 30 November 1931 at St Mary's Cathedral, Sydney by Archbishop Bartolomeo Cattaneo, Apostolic Delegate to Australia. He celebrated his first Mass at St Joseph's College, Hunters Hill. His first appointment was as assistant priest in Bankstown, where he worked with the Eris O'Brien, who would become Archbishop of Canberra and Goulburn.

He headed Catholic Action in Sydney in the 1940s and Catholic social welfare in the 1950s. In 1946, he was appointed the National Director of Pontifical Mission Aid Societies in Australia, a position he held until 1973. In this role, he became well known across Australia and worldwide for his zeal and enthusiasm for the missions.

He became a Prothonotary Apostolic in 1958 and was given the title of Monsignor.

== Episcopacy ==
On 29 September 1963, Thomas was appointed Bishop of Bathurst by Pope Paul VI. He was consecrated in St. Peter's Basilica, Vatican City on 20 October 1963 by Pope Paul VI. He was one of the 14 bishops consecrated in the ceremony, which was attended by many of the 2,200 bishops participating in the Second Vatican Council. His consecration entitled him to participate in the second, third and fourth sessions of the Council.

As Bishop of Bathurst in the 1960s, he vigorously pursued an anti-Communist line with support for the Democratic Labor Party. As Australian Director of the Pontifical Mission Society, he criticised donors who wished to give to particular projects, writing, "Today people are so self-centred that even in their charity they wish to have some self-satisfaction. Hence they prefer to give to a specific need or project than to give to a world-wide fund such as the Holy Father's Propagation of the Faith."

Like many bishops of his era, Thomas also faced shortages of staff at schools, as lay teachers took on greater roles within Catholic schools, due to decline in the number of religious staff available. He said religious vocations had failed to keep pace with the growth of the Church.

He implemented many changes in the Diocese during his tenure, establishing the Diocesan Pastoral Revenue, developing the chancery office, improving the Diocesan archives, founding the Catholic Observer and encouraging a greater role for the laity in local parish administration.

When Cardinal Norman Thomas Gilroy retired as Archbishop of Sydney in 1971, Thomas was among the contenders for the role, however James Darcy Freeman, Bishop of Armidale, was chosen instead.

== Retirement and death ==
Thomas was forced to retire on 12 April 1983 on medical advice, a few months shy of the canonical retirement age of 75. Despite retiring, he continued to serve as Apostolic Administrator of the Diocese until a replacement could be found. He passed away suddenly on 24 September 1983, suffering a heart attack while moving belongings into a unit in Wollstonecraft where he had planned to live in retirement.
