= Michael McKenna (bishop) =

Australian suffragan bishop (born 1951)

The Most Reverend Michael McKenna
- Eighth Bishop of Bathurst
- See: Bathurst
- Installed: 15 April 2009
- Predecessor: Patrick Dougherty

Orders
- Ordination: 19 August 1983 (Priest) in St Paul's National Seminary, Sydney
- Consecration: 26 June 2009 (Bishop) in St Michael and St John's Cathedral, Bathurst

Personal details
- Born: Michael Joseph McKenna; 8 December 1951 (age 74) Bairnsdale, Victoria, Australia
- Denomination: Roman Catholic Church
- Parents: Maxwell and Marie (née Warburton) McKenna
- Occupation: Roman Catholic bishop
- Profession: Cleric
- Education: The University of Melbourne; St Paul's National Seminary, Sydney; Sydney College of Divinity; Gregorian University, Rome; Harvard University
- Motto: Legato con amore (Bound with love)

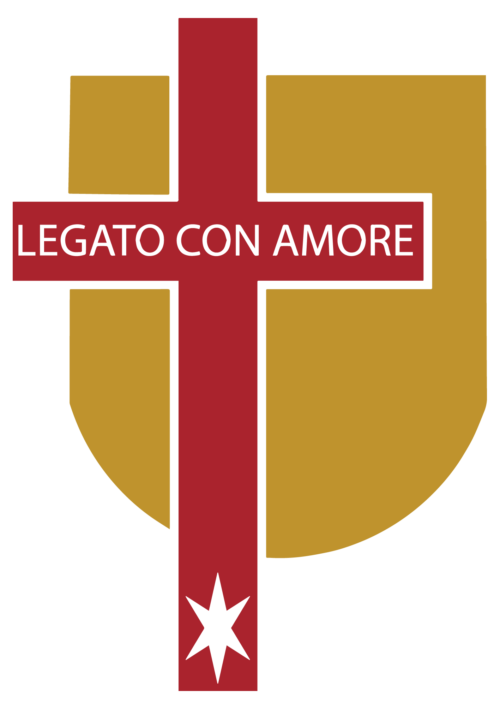
Bishop Michael McKenna coat of arms

Michael Joseph McKenna (8 December 1951 in Bairnsdale, Victoria), an Australian suffragan bishop, is the eighth Roman Catholic Bishop of the Diocese of Bathurst, appointed in 2009.

== Early years and background ==
The eldest of the eleven children born to Maxwell and Marie (née Warburton) McKenna, Michael McKenna was educated at St Patrick's School, Stratford, and at St Patrick's College, Sale. From 1971–74, he studied in the Honours Schools of Political Science and English Literature at The University of Melbourne. With an early interest in audio and video technology, McKenna worked as a producer and presenter on 3RRR-FM and showed works at the Melbourne Fringe and St Kilda Film Festivals. He commenced studying for the priesthood at St Paul's National Seminary, Sydney, and in 1983 was ordained priest by Bishop D'Arcy; graduating in theology from the Sydney College of Divinity in 1984.

Returning to Victoria, McKenna was appointed an Assistant Priest in the parish of St Joseph's, Warragul in the Diocese of Sale before moving to an administrative role as Bishop's Secretary, Diocesan Secretary and Chancellor where he was a regular columnist in the diocesan monthly newspaper, Catholic Life. While undertaking postgraduate studies from the Gregorian University in Rome, in 1991 McKenna was elected as General Secretary of the Australian Catholic Bishops' Conference, based in Canberra. During 1998 he was Administrator of Lumen Christi Parish, Churchill before taking up a Resident Fellowship in the Divinity School of Harvard University.

Serving as rector of Corpus Christi College from 1999 until 2005, McKenna established strong links between the Seminary and the Catholic Church in Vietnam. He was a member of the Senate of Catholic Theological College and of the Melbourne College of Divinity, where he served as chair of the Board of Ministry Studies.

In 2006, McKenna was appointed as Catholic Chaplain to the University of Melbourne, where it is reported he reintroduced the celebration of Mass on campus and started new groups in social service, biblical study, Christian meditation and philosophy and faith. In 2007, he took on the pastoral care of All Saints Parish, Fitzroy, an inner city community of many cultures, most notably Vietnamese and Sudanese. That year, he was elected to the Archbishop's Council of Priests and appointed to the Melbourne Catholic-Evangelical-Pentecostal Dialogue.

== Roman Catholic Bishop of Bathurst ==
On 15 April 2009 McKenna was appointed as Bishop of the Diocese of Bathurst and was consecrated on 26 June 2009 by George Cardinal Pell, together with Bishops Emeritus Patrick Dougherty and Jeremiah Coffey, Bishop of Sale. It was the first time since the consecration of Bishop O'Farrell in 1920 that a bishop had been consecrated in Bathurst, though he was not consecrated in the Cathedral of St Michael and St John, but at St Stanislaus' College.

Catholic Church titles
Preceded by Patrick Dougherty	8th Catholic Bishop of Bathurst; 2009 – present	Succeeded by incumbent
