= John Dunne (bishop of Bathurst) =

Irish-Australian suffragan bishop

The Right Reverend John Dunne DD
- 3rd Roman Catholic Bishop
- Diocese: Diocese of Bathurst
- Installed: 12 January 1901
- Term ended: 22 August 1919
- Predecessor: Joseph Byrne
- Successor: Michael O'Farrell

Orders
- Ordination: 24 June 1870 (Priest) in All Hallows College, Drumcondra, Dublin
- Consecration: 8 September 1901 (Bishop)

Personal details
- Born: John Mary Dunne; 8 June 1845 Tooreigh, Mitchelstown, County Cork, Ireland
- Died: 22 August 1919 (aged 74) Bathurst, New South Wales, Australia
- Buried: Bathurst Cemetery, Bathurst, New South Wales
- Denomination: Roman Catholic Church
- Parents: Michael Dunne and Mary Dunne (née Hennessy)
- Occupation: Roman Catholic bishop
- Profession: Cleric
- Education: Christian Brothers School, Mitchelstown; Mount Melleray College; All Hallows College

John Mary Dunne (8 June 1845 in Tooreigh, Mitchelstown, County Cork, Ireland – 22 August 1919 in Bathurst, New South Wales), an Australian suffragan bishop, was the third Bishop of the Roman Catholic Diocese of Bathurst, New South Wales. Reverend Dunne was consecrated by Cardinal Moran in 1901 and served until his death in 1919.

== Early years and background ==
Born to Michael Dunne, a farmer, and his wife Mary, née Hennessy, Dunne was educated by the Christian Brothers at Mitchelstown, and Mount Melleray College, and studied for the priesthood at All Hallows College, Drumcondra, Dublin, where he was ordained priest on 24 June 1870 and arrived in Sydney the following year, before transferring to the Bathurst diocese. Dunne served in the Fish River district, at Mudgee and at Wentworth on the Darling River, before becoming a parish priest in 1875 in Dubbo. Over a period of ten years, Dunne established a brick church and the Convent of Mercy, which had day and boarding schools, before being recalled to Bathurst to administer the cathedral parish, supervising the construction of a Patrician Brothers' monastery and enlargement of the cathedral. Dunne eventually served as vicar-general from 1900 under Bishop Joseph Byrne.

== Roman Catholic Bishop of Bathurst ==
Following the death of Bishop Byrne, Dunne was elected Bishop of Bathurst on 12 January 1901, and consecrated by Cardinal Moran on 8 September 1901. Widely known as the 'Builder Bishop', Dunne is credited with ensuring that every parish had a church, school, presbytery and convent. In Bathurst he raised the money to build St Joseph's Mount and Orphanage, St Philomena's School and the stately Bishop's House. Keenly interested in St Stanislaus' College, he gave generously to finance its 1907 additions. Throughout his life Dunne promoted Catholic education. As a prudent and skilful administrator and a near-genius at raising money, he made the 'voluntary system' work in his diocese. Before he visited Europe in 1906, he was presented with a purse containing £1,000, most of which he characteristically saved during his year's absence, and presented the remainder to St Stanislaus' College.

Dunne died of cancer at Bishop's House on 22 August 1919 and was buried in the Catholic section of Bathurst cemetery.

Catholic Church titles
Preceded by Joseph Byrne	3rd Catholic Bishop of Bathurst; 1901-1919	Succeeded by Michael O'Farrell
