= Bathurst =

Bathurst may refer to:

== People ==
- Bathurst (surname)
- Bathurst Bellers Mann (1858–1948), Irish-born rugby union player in Wales
- Bathurst Peachy (1893–1953), American college head baseball coach

== Places and jurisdictions ==
=== Australia ===
- Bathurst, New South Wales, Australia, a city
  - Bathurst Region, the local government area for the Bathurst urban area and rural surrounds
  - Roman Catholic Diocese of Bathurst in Australia
  - Anglican Diocese of Bathurst
  - Electoral district of Bathurst, a state legislative assembly district
  - Electoral district of Bathurst (County), a former electoral district
  - Bathurst County
- Lake Bathurst (New South Wales)
- Bathurst Bay, Queensland
- Bathurst Harbour, Tasmania
- Bathurst Island (Northern Territory)
- Bathurst Lighthouse, Rottnest Island

=== Canada ===
- Bathurst District, a historic district in Upper Canada, also a county within the district

==== New Brunswick ====
- Bathurst, New Brunswick
- Bathurst Parish, New Brunswick
- Bathurst (electoral district)
- Acadie—Bathurst
- Roman Catholic Diocese of Bathurst in Canada

==== Northwest Territories ====
- Cape Bathurst, a peninsula

==== Nunavut ====
- Bathurst Inlet, a body of water
- Bathurst Island (Nunavut)

==== Ontario ====
- Bathurst, Ontario, a former township

=== Elsewhere ===
- Banjul, The Gambia, a city known as Bathurst until 1973
- Bathurst, Sierra Leone, a village
- Bathurst, Eastern Cape, South Africa
- A market garden in the hamlet of Heathrow, U.K.; see Heathrow timeline

== Schools ==
- Bathurst High School (New South Wales), Australia
- Bathurst High School (New Brunswick), Canada
- Stuart Bathurst Catholic High School, a co-educational Roman Catholic secondary school and sixth form, in Wednesbury in the West Midlands of England

== Ships ==
- Bathurst-class corvette, a class of sixty ships used during and after World War II
- HMS Bathurst (1821); see Phillip Parker King
- HMAS Bathurst (J158), a Royal Australian Navy corvette, serving from 1940 until 1946
- HMAS Bathurst (ACPB 85), a Royal Australian Navy patrol boat commissioned in 2006

== Sports ==
- Bathurst Panthers, an Australian rugby league football team based in Bathurst, New South Wales
- Bathurst '75 FC, an Australian amateur football club based in Bathurst, New South Wales
- Bathurst 1000, an annual motor race for touring cars run in Bathurst, New South Wales, Australia
- Bathurst 24 Hour, a former endurance race for GT and production cars
- Bathurst 250, a former annual motor race in Bathurst, New South Wales

== Transportation ==
=== Australia ===
- Bathurst Airport (New South Wales)
- Bathurst railway station, New South Wales
- Bathurst Street, Hobart
- Bathurst Street, Sydney

=== Canada ===
- Bathurst Airport (New Brunswick)
- Bathurst station (New Brunswick), a railway station
- Bathurst Street (Toronto), Ontario
  - Bathurst station (Toronto), a subway station
  - 511 Bathurst, a streetcar line in Toronto previously named simply the Bathurst route (without number)

== Other uses ==
- Earl Bathurst, a title in the Peerage of Great Britain
- Bathurst baronets, an extinct or dormant title in the Baronetage of England
- Bathurst Power and Paper Company, a Canadian former combined logging, lumber mill and wood-pulp paper company based in Bathurst, New Brunswick
- Bathurst Resources, a coal mining company in New Zealand

== See also ==
- Bathurst Group, a geologic group in Nunavut, Canada
- Bathurst House, an historic Grade II* listed building in York, North Yorkshire, England
- Bathurst War, an 1824 war between the Wiradjuri nation and the United Kingdom in New South Wales, Australia
