= Michael O'Farrell (bishop) =

Irish-Australian suffragan bishop

The Right Reverend Michael O'Farrell
- 4th Roman Catholic Bishop
- Diocese: Diocese of Bathurst
- Installed: 16 June 1920
- Term ended: 4 April 1928
- Predecessor: John Dunne
- Successor: John Norton

Orders
- Ordination: 3 March 1887 (Priest)
- Consecration: 30 November 1920 (Bishop) in St Michael and St John's Cathedral, Bathurst

Personal details
- Born: 7 April 1865 Milhow, Mullingar, County Westmeath, Ireland
- Died: 4 April 1928 (aged 62) Orange, New South Wales, Australia
- Buried: Bathurst Cemetery, Bathurst, New South Wales
- Denomination: Roman Catholic Church
- Occupation: Roman Catholic bishop
- Profession: Cleric
- Education: St Finian's College, Navan; St Patrick's Seminary, Maynooth

Michael O'Farrell (7 April 1865 in Milhow, Mullingar, County Westmeath, Ireland – 4 April 1928 in Orange, New South Wales), an Australian suffragan bishop, was the fourth Bishop of the Roman Catholic Diocese of Bathurst, New South Wales. O'Farrell was consecrated by the Apostolic Delegate, Archbishop Cattaneo in 1920 and served until his death in 1928. O'Farrell was the first Vincentian bishop in Australia.

== Early years and background ==
Educated at St. Finian's College, Navan, O'Farrell came from a devout religious family that included two sisters who became Sisters of Mercy, and three of his brothers became priests, two of whom migrated to Australia and worked as priests in the Archdiocese of Sydney. O'Farrell studied for the priesthood at St Patrick's Seminary, Maynooth, and he was ordained priest on 23 March 1887. He joined the Vincentians following Ordination. While at Maynooth, he studied with Daniel Mannix, who later became Archbishop of Melbourne. O'Farrell initially served as a missionary in Sheffield, England, before returning to Ireland where he became the Professor of Ecclesiastical History and of Higher Mathematics and Physics at All Hallows College in Dublin; subsequently taking up a post as Professor of Moral Theology at the Irish College in Paris. O'Farrell returned to Ireland in 1903 and for the next ten years conducted missions and retreats based from the Vincentian Parish at Phibsboro, in Dublin.

Arriving in Sydney in 1913, O'Farrell took up residence at St Vincent's, Ashfield with the intention of conducting mission work. However, he was asked to act as the Spiritual Director of the two diocesan seminaries, firstly at St Columba's College, Springwood, and later at St Patrick's College, Manly. By 1915, O'Farrell had become the Vice Rector at St John's College within The University of Sydney.

== Roman Catholic Bishop of Bathurst ==
At 55-years of age, O'Farrell was elected Bishop of Bathurst on 16 June 1920, some ten months after the death of his predecessor. His election was considered a surprise by some as O'Farrell had never served as a parish priest in Australia, nor held the office of Superior in his own community, or, it would seem, any administrative position other than that of Vice Rector at St John's. O'Farrell was consecrated as bishop in St Michael and St John's Cathedral, Bathurst by the Apostolic Delegate, Archbishop Cattaneo on 30 November 1920.

After an expansionist period under Bishop Dunne, O'Farrell is accredited with placing the diocese on a firm financial and administrative footing. Immediately after his consecration, an audit of St Stanislaus' College, Bathurst was conducted. The auditor's report was critical of the lack of proper book-keeping. Under the guidance of Fr John Hall, within three years a subsequent auditor's report had seen a significant improvement. O'Farrell acquired Hathrop, a palatial residence in Bathurst and established St Vincent's Hospital in 1922 as "an institution catering especially for the sick poor."

In 1926, he brought the Daughters of Charity from England to Bathurst and entrusted them with the former Patrician Brothers novitiate in Orange and established a Boys’ Orphanage, the first work of the Daughters in Australia. He also presided over extensions to St Joseph's Orphanage in Bathurst, a new church at Kandos, improvements to other churches, and new convents in Borenore, Forest Reefs, Millthorpe and Portland. O'Farrell is also credited with the growth of the Society of Saint Vincent de Paul in the diocese, with congregations at Bathurst, Portland, Orange, Wellington, Cowra, Mudgee, Canowindra, Gulgong, Coonamble and Dubbo. O'Farrell also supported the university education, board and lodging of several of the Sisters of St Joseph to gain degrees in education and arts at The University of Sydney. Under his bishopship, he was able to recruit postulants for the two communities of religious sisters whose work was predominantly in education: the Sisters of St Joseph and the Sisters of Mercy.

However, O'Farrell was not without his critics, most notably the Patrician Brothers who felt that he was more favourably inclined towards the Vincentians at St Stanislaus’ College. When the Patrician Brothers opened a boarding section attached to the parish school in Dubbo in 1921, O'Farrell claimed that the Brothers failed to teach the prescribed syllabus, which was the same syllabus as that laid down for the state schools. When a summer school of teachers was organised by O'Farrell with attendees from the Department in Public Instruction, the Brothers made a cursory appearance. Following the commissioning of a report that showed less than satisfactory education and teaching performance, O'Farrell charged the Brothers with incompetence and demanded in November 1924 that they leave the diocese. Despite an appeal to Rome, the Brothers lost and their schools were taken over by the De La Salle Brothers and their novitiate in Orange became Croagh Patrick Orphanage.

As bishop, O'Farrell led a relatively private life, with the exception of a public battle with the Anglican Bishop of Bathurst, Dr George Long. The battle became known as the Ne Temere debate, taking its name from the 1908 decree that imposed the obligation that a Catholic marry before a priest, even when not marrying another Catholic. Failure to do so rendered that marriage invalid in the eyes of the Catholic Church. The consequence was that the Catholic Church regarded any children born of the marriage to be illegitimate.

Aware that his health was failing, O'Farrell travelled to Rome for the Holy Year celebrations in 1925, taking his administrator, Father John Norton with him. While there, O'Farrell arranged to have Norton consecrated a Bishop with right of succession. O'Farrell returned to Australia in ill-health and died in Orange Presbytery on 4 April 1928. He was buried from St Michael and St John's Cathedral in the Catholic section of the Bathurst cemetery. O'Farrell left an estate of £2,896 to his successors for charitable purposes in New South Wales.

Catholic Church titles
Preceded by John Dunne	4th Catholic Bishop of Bathurst; 1920 – 1928	Succeeded by John Norton
