= Joseph Byrne (bishop) =

Australian cleric (1942–1901)

The Right Reverend Joseph Byrne
- 2nd Roman Catholic Bishop
- Diocese: Bathurst
- Installed: 9 August 1885
- Term ended: 12 January 1901
- Predecessor: Matthew Quinn
- Successor: John Dunne
- Other posts: President, Seminary of St Charles Borromeo (1875 – 1885) and President, St Stanislaus' College (1884 – 1885) both in Bathurst, New South Wales

Orders
- Ordination: 15 February 1847 (Priest) in Rouen Seminary
- Consecration: 9 August 1885 (Bishop)

Personal details
- Born: 18 June 1843 Dublin, Ireland
- Died: 12 January 1901 (aged 57) New South Wales, Australia
- Denomination: Roman Catholic Church
- Parents: Patrick and Maria Byrne
- Occupation: Roman Catholic bishop
- Profession: Cleric
- Education: St Lawrence O'Toole College and Rouen Seminary

Joseph Partick Byrne (18 June 1843 – 12 January 1901), an Australian suffragan bishop, was the second Roman Catholic Bishop of the Diocese of Bathurst, New South Wales. Reverend Byrne was consecrated by Bishop James Murray in 1885 and served until his death in 1901.

== Early years and background ==
Born in Dublin, Ireland to Patrick Byrne, and his wife, Maria, Byrne was educated in Dublin at St Lawrence O'Toole College (Hardcourt Street, Dublin) and Rouen Seminary where he was ordained a priest in 1865. Whilst at St Lawrence O'Toole College, he met Matthew Quinn. When Quinn was consecrated as the inaugural Catholic Bishop of Bathurst, Byrne volunteered to accompany Quinn to Australia aboard the Empress. Initially working as a priest in the Diocese of Bathurst, Byrne deputised in Murray's Diocese of Maitland during the latter's absence in Europe from 1869 to 1873. Returning to Bathurst in 1873, Byrne was instrumental in the establishment of Australia's first seminary in Bathurst, named in honour of St Charles Borromeo and in the formative years of St Stanislaus' College where he also served as president, from 1884 until 1885.

== Episcopate ==
Modelled in the style of Quinn, his predecessor, Byrne built on the established foundations by adding churches in Gulgong, Coonamble and Stuart Town, and a convent at Wellington. In 1887 the Brigidine Sisters and in 1884 the Patrician Brothers provided a boost to teaching in the diocese. Byrne also established the St Vincent de Paul Society and in 1888 invited the Vincentian Fathers to take over St Stanislaus' College and St Charles' Seminary; the latter which was closed in 1896 after St Patrick's Seminary in Manly was opened in 1889.

In 1875, Byrne sent Father John Dunne to Dubbo as parish priest and over a period of ten years helped him establish a brick church and the Convent of Mercy, which had day and boarding schools, before recalling him to Bathurst to administer the cathedral parish, supervising the construction of a Patrician Brothers' monastery and enlargement of the cathedral. Dunne eventually served as vicar-general from 1900, a role that Byrne had served under Quinn's direction.

Byrne followed a similar pattern of rejecting the independence of the Josephite community, formed by Father Julian Tenison-Woods in conjunction with Mary MacKillop. Byrne barred Woods from exercising any further influence; destroying letters and records, and demoting him to the rank of episcopal confrère. Byrne favoured one of Tenison-Woods' graduates, a young geologist, John Milne Curran, who was ordained a priest in 1885. Byrne granted Curran permission to accept appointment as lecturer in geology and mineralogy at the Sydney Technical College and later as government geologist, before returning to Bathurst to edit the Catholic newspaper, The Record. Byrne also facilitated the establishment of the Diocese of Wilcannia-Forbes which was formed out of the Bathurst diocese.

Byrne died of cancer in New South Wales, whilst serving in office as Catholic Bishop of Bathurst.

Catholic Church titles
Preceded by Matthew Quinn	2nd Catholic Bishop of Bathurst; 1885–1901	Succeeded by John Dunne
