= Matthew Quinn (bishop) =

Australian Catholic bishop (1821–1885)

The Most Reverend Matthew Quinn
- 1st Roman Catholic Bishop
- Diocese: Diocese of Bathurst
- Installed: 1 November 1866
- Term ended: 16 January 1885
- Predecessor: New Diocese
- Successor: Joseph Byrne
- Other posts: President of St Laurence O'Toole's Seminary, Dublin (1859-1865)

Orders
- Ordination: 15 February 1847 (Priest) in Church of St John Lateran, Rome
- Consecration: 14 November 1865 (Bishop) in St Mary's Pro-Cathedral, Dublin

Personal details
- Born: 29 May 1821 Eadestown, County Kildare, Ireland
- Died: 16 January 1885 (aged 63) Bathurst, New South Wales, Australia
- Buried: Sts. Michael and John's Cathedral, Bathurst
- Denomination: Roman Catholic Church
- Parents: Matthew Quinn and Mary Quinn (née Doyle)
- Occupation: Roman Catholic bishop
- Profession: Cleric
- Education: Propaganda College, Rome; Pontifical Irish College; Church of St John Lateran, Rome

Matthew Quinn (29 May 1821 in Eadestown, County Kildare, Ireland – 16 January 1885 in Bathurst, New South Wales), an Australian suffragan bishop, was the first Roman Catholic Bishop of the Diocese of Bathurst, New South Wales. Dr Quinn was appointed to the role by Archbishop Polding in 1865 and served until his death in 1885.

== Early years and background ==
The youngest son of Matthew Quinn, a farmer, and his wife, Mary, Quinn was educated in Dublin before entering the Propaganda College in Rome in 1837, studying for the priesthood before transferring to the Pontifical Irish College in 1839 where he graduated with a doctorate in sacred theology in 1845. Ordained a priest in 1847 in the Church of St John Lateran in Rome, Quinn worked as a missionary in Hyderabad with Bishop Daniel Murphy for eight years; returning to Ireland and became vice-president of St. Lawrence O'Toole's Seminary, Dublin; where his brother James was President. Quinn succeeded as President in 1859 on James' appointment as Bishop of Queensland. For the next six years, Quinn supported James through the organisation of shiploads of Irish migrants to Queensland.

== Roman Catholic Bishop of Bathurst ==
Consecrated by Archbishop Cullen together with his cousin, James Murray, the 2nd Bishop of Maitland, Quinn arrived in Australia aboard Empress on 21 October 1866 with Murray, nine priests (including Joseph Byrne) and sixteen nuns. Quinn, together with his brother in Brisbane and his cousin in Maitland, were a powerful Irish troika against the monasticism of Archbishop Polding; crafting the rise of the Irish Catholic church in Australia. Although Quinn opposed the appointment of Vaughan, another English Benedictine, as co-adjutor archbishop of Sydney in 1872, it was his position of influence and the success of his schools that won him the support of Vaughan, other bishops, and the laity.

Quinn was widely renowned for the establishment of a system of Catholic schools principally run by religious orders, including St Stanislaus' College and the congregation of Sisters of St. Joseph, both in the Diocese of Bathurst, and St. Charles Seminary and introduced the Vincentian Fathers into Australia. Quinn was often at the forefront of battles with the colonial government following the Public Instruction Act of 1880 which withdrew all government aid from denominational schools. Sectarian tensions intensified after the promulgation of the Public Schools Act of 1866, coinciding with the waning influence of English Benedictine Catholicism and the increasing influence of Quinn and other Irish prelates. In 1879, Quinn instructed one of his flock, Richard Kenna, to withdraw his son from Sydney Grammar School. When Kenna refused, Quinn decided that he could neither take the sacraments nor be buried in consecrated ground. Prominent Irish Catholics in the town supported Quinn, including the Principal of St. Stanislaus' College, Dr Joseph Byrne, and store owner John Meagher. This has been described as 'the most notorious sectarian episode in the history of Bathurst'.

After the 1875 establishment of the Institute of St Joseph by Mary MacKillop, following the 1877 death of Sr. Teresa MacDonald, the Provincial of Bathurst, Quinn would not allow another Provincial to be appointed that did not report to him. He instructed the Sisters to leave Bathurst as he refused to accept MacKillop's central government of the Institute, where she held the role of Superior General.

After a trip to Europe during 1883 and 1884, Quinn returned to Bathurst, where he died at St. Stanislaus' College and was buried in Sts. Michael and John's Cathedral, in Bathurst.

Catholic Church titles
Preceded by New title	1st Catholic Bishop of Bathurst; 1865–1885	Succeeded by Joseph Byrne
