= St Stanislaus' College, Bathurst =

St Stanislaus' College

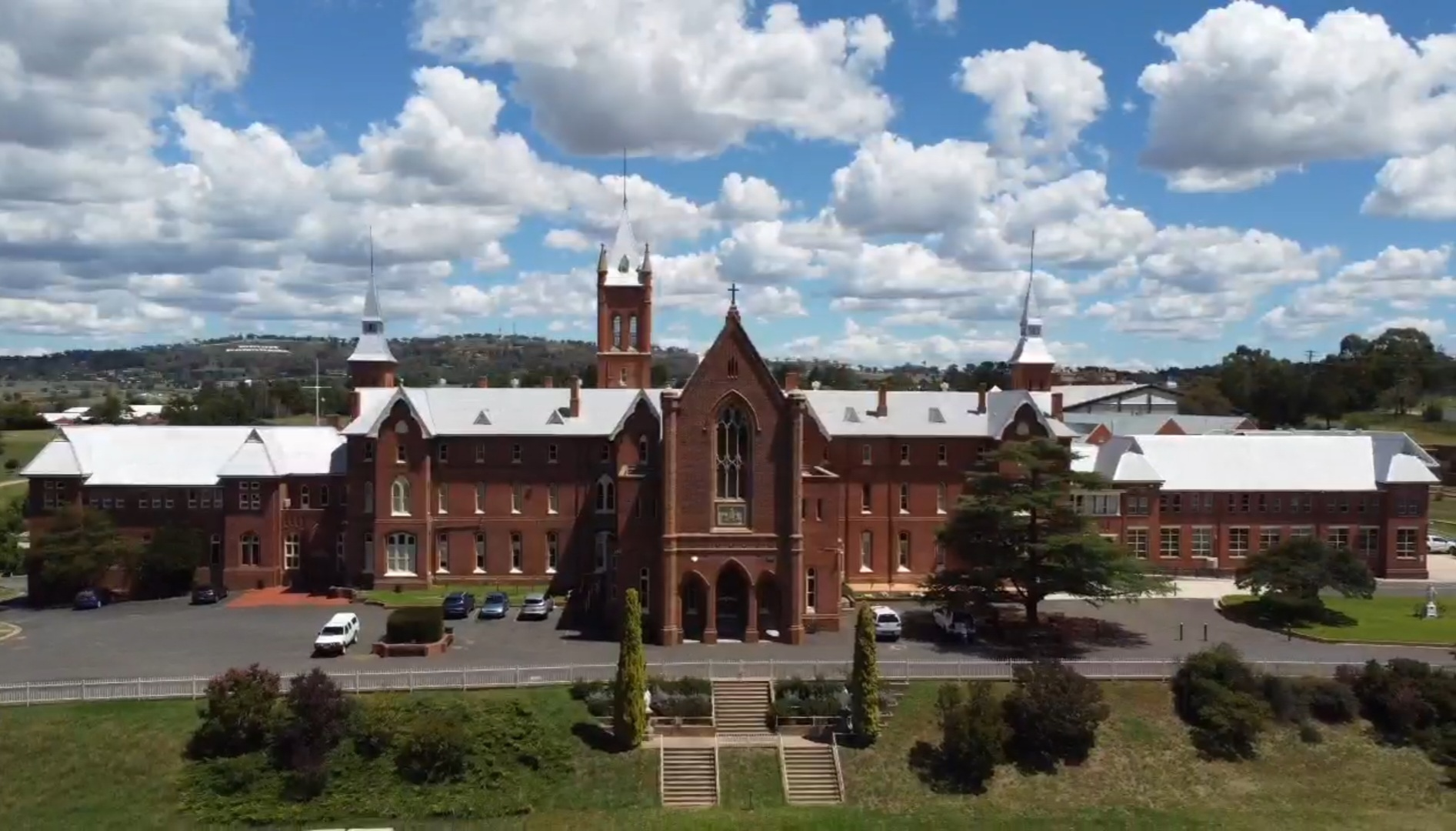
- Main building, St Stanislaus' College

Location
- 220 Bentinck Street, Bathurst, New South Wales; Australia; 33°25′44″S 149°34′11″E

Information
- Type: Independent secondary day and boarding school
- Motto: Latin: Nos Autem in Nomine Domini (But we (Trust) in the name of the Lord)
- Religious affiliation: Vincentian (Congregation of the Mission)
- Denomination: Roman Catholic
- Patron saint: Saint Stanislaus Kostka SJ
- Established: 1867; 159 years ago
- Founder: Bishop Matthew Quinn DD
- Educational authority: New South Wales Department of Education
- Chairperson: Angus Benbow
- Head of College: Lindsay Fuhrman-Luck
- Staff: 103
- Teaching staff: 54
- Years: 7–12
- Gender: Male
- Enrolment: 713 (2025)
- Houses: Charles, John, Joseph, Justin, Vincent, Xavier
- Colours: Navy blue and white
- Song: The Vincentius
- Fight song: The Ric
- Nickname: Stannies, SSC
- Publication: Seasons at Stannies
- Yearbook: Echoes
- Affiliation: Association of Heads of Independent Schools of Australia; Association of Independent Schools of New South Wales; Australian Boarding Schools Association (ABSA); Independent Sporting Association (Australia); International Boys’ Schools Coalition
- Alumni: St Stanislaus' College Old Boys' Association
- Website: www.stannies.com

St Stanislaus' College is an Australian independent Roman Catholic secondary day and boarding school for boys located in Bathurst, in the Central West region of New South Wales, Australia, 200 kilometres (120 mi) west of Sydney.

Founded in 1867 and conducted since 1889 by the Congregation of the Mission's priests and brothers, the college is the oldest Catholic boys' boarding school in Australia, and caters for approximately 700 students from Year 7 to Year 12, including approximately 120 boarders. The early history of the college is intertwined with that of the short-lived St Charles' Seminary; both institutions shared the original towered section of building facing Brilliant Street until the latter closed in the late 1800s.

St Stanislaus' College is a member of the Association of Heads of Independent Schools of Australia (AHISA), the Association of Independent Schools of New South Wales (AISNSW), the International Boys’ Schools Coalition (IBSC), and is one of 13 full members of the Independent Sporting Association (ISA).

St Stanislaus' College exists to give a secondary education to boys in such a way that the Christian faith in the Catholic tradition is offered, built up and practised. The school also aims to provide a holistic education, supporting the spiritual, intellectual, social and physical growth of boys into young men.

== College motto ==
St Stanislaus' College shares its motto with its older sister, St Vincent's College in Castleknock, Dublin: "Nos Autem In Nomine Domini" ("We, however, in the name of the Lord"), which comes from Psalm 20:7 (Septuagint numbering 19:7). The text in the psalm is "Hi in curribus et hi en equis; nos autem in nomine Domini Dei nostri invocabimus" ("Some trust in chariots or horses; we, however, [trust] in the Name of the Lord."). However, considering "invocabimus", it may be more accurately translated as "we, however, will call upon the Name of the Lord".

== Patron saints ==
=== St Stanislaus ===
The main patron saint of the college is St Stanislaus Kostka SJ of Poland (1550–1568). He walked from Vienna to Rome to join the Jesuit order. En route Kostka stopped at Dilingen in obedience to St Peter Canisius who tested his vocation there. On his seventeenth birthday, Kostka achieved his aim and joined the order. Partly because of the exhaustion from his arduous journey, he died about two months before he turned eighteen.

=== House patrons ===
The college has six houses.

The patron of St Vincent's House is St Vincent de Paul (1581–1660), the founder of the Congregation of the Mission, also called the Vincentian order. The charism of St Vincent influences all that the College does in that it is a way of following Christ that has been passed on at the College since 1889. St Vincent also founded the Daughters of Charity and gave his life in service of the poor and is known as the patron saint of charitable societies.

The patron of St Charles' House is St Charles Borromeo (1538–1584) who was the patron of the short-lived seminary which was the sister institution of the College in the early years. There is a statue of him on the old part of the College grounds. He was Cardinal Archbishop of Milan from 1564 to 1584, and a leading figure of the Counter-Reformation, along with Ignatius of Loyola and Philip Neri.

The patron of St Joseph's House is St Joseph, Husband of the Blessed Virgin Mary; the patron of St John's House is St John the Evangelist; the patron of St Justin's House is St Giustino de Jacobis CM, a Vincentian missionary bishop in Ethiopia; and the patron of Xavier's House is St Francis Xavier SJ, a Jesuit missionary who traveled around South-East Asia.

All six House Patrons have their own stained glass windows in the College Chapel.

== College war-cry and song ==
The Ric

The College war-cry is known as "The Ric". The words are:

Stannies, Stannies, one, two, three...
Ric, ric, rickety ric,
Hoopra, hooopra, hey!
Hey hoopra, hey hoopra,
Hey, hey, hey!
Aussie, aussie-ah,
who are, who are, who are we?
We are, we are SSC!
Where do we come from, yeah, yeah, yeah?
Stannies, Stannies 'heyah!

The Vincentius

The College Song is the 'Vincentius', a Latin hymn about St Vincent de Paul which includes a rendering of verses 15 and 16 of Psalm 132.

Vincentius orphanorum pater
Pauperes Sion saturabo panibus
Sacerdotes eius induam salutari.

Translation:

Vincent, father of orphans
The poor of Sion I will satisfy with bread
Its priests I will clothe with salvation.

== History ==
St Stanislaus' College was established in 1867 with 14 boys, near the present St Michael and St John's Cathedral. Tuition occurred until 1873 in part of the Denominational School, which replaced the demolished St Michael's church, and the boarders lived nearby under the care of Michael McGirr; the first President was his cousin, Fr James McGirr. A quote from the Catholic newspaper, The Freeman's Journal, mentions the new College:

A first class high school under the patronage and name of St Stanislaus will be opened on Monday next, under a competent staff of teachers, for the more advanced boys. Latin, Greek, French, mathematics, music, and the high branches of English literature are to be particularly attended to, principally with a view of preparing students for matriculation in the University, as well as fitting them for commercial pursuits.

The school came under the control of the Congregation of the Mission in 1889, following the arrival of the Vincentian Fathers and Brothers from Ireland. Their task was to run the College and St Charles' Seminary on the same site. The seminary was founded in 1875 and closed at the end of 1891.

In 1892, the College became a member of the Athletic Association of the Great Public Schools of New South Wales (AAGPS). However, travelling to Sydney for sports was difficult and membership was relinquished some years later.

In 1896, the college received much media attention when it became the site of the first x-ray for medical purposes in Australia. This x-ray was taken by Father Joseph Patrick Slattery on 21 September, and showed the location of gunshot in the shattered hand of an ex-student.

The main oval was opened with a game of cricket on St Patrick's Day 1932, a College team pitted against an Australian XI captained by Alan Kippax and including Don Bradman. The college has mainly played rugby union although rugby league was played for some years in all decades from the 1910s to the 1950s. The First XV won the Waratah Shield in 1974, 1980, 1981 and 1995.

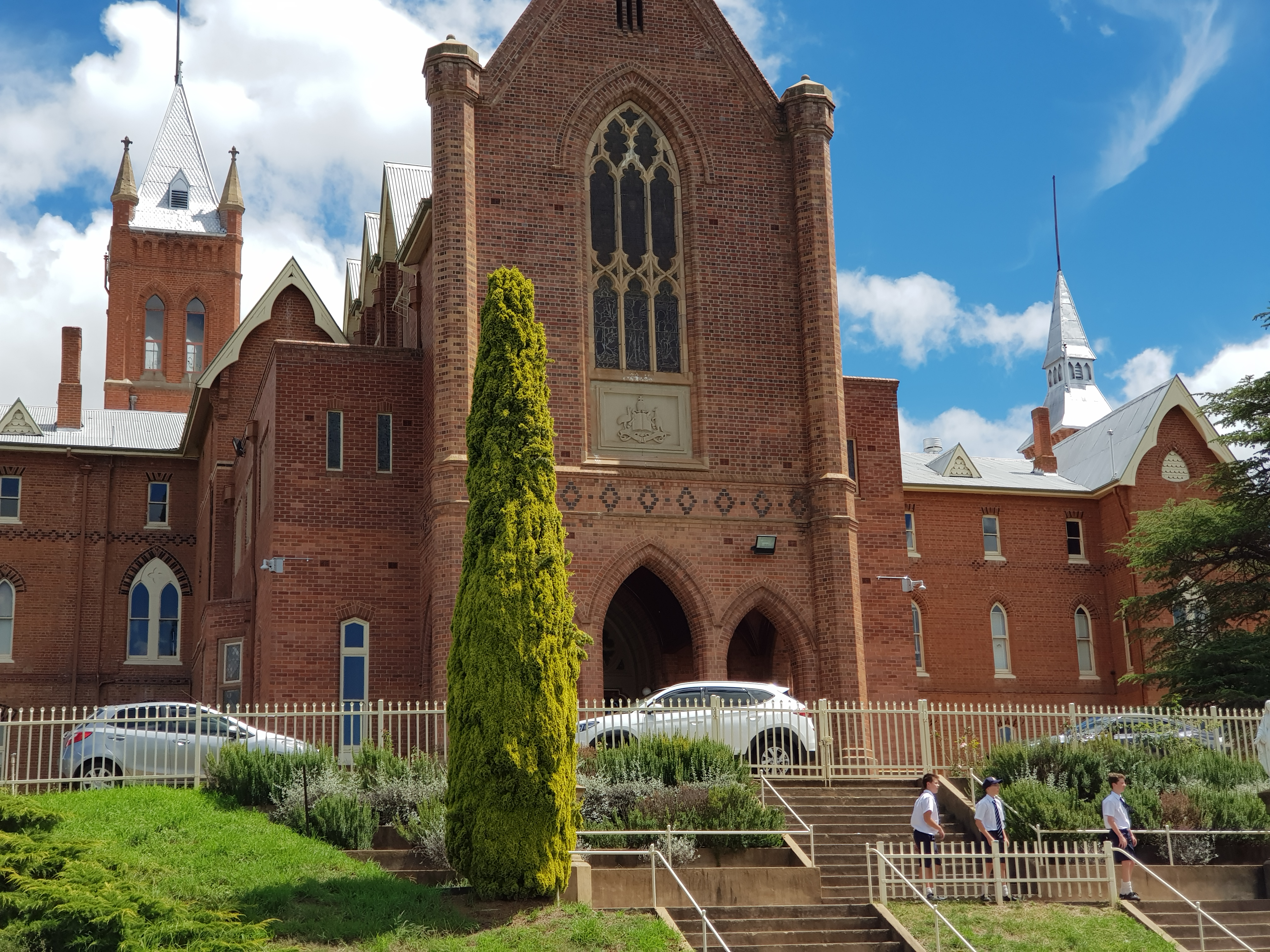
Front of college.

Regarding the present site, the original part of the college's building with its three towers was constructed in stages from 1872 to 1907. Other additions included the Gallagher Wing, completed in 1942; an extension of the Chapel and Marble Hall, completed 1954; the John Hall Wing, completed in 1962; and the Slattery Wing, opened by Prime Minister Robert Menzies in 1965. In 1971 an olympic swimming pool was opened; the Guthrie Library, completed in 1976; the McMahon Wing, opened in 1985 and completing an internal quadrangle; the "Brothers" Industrial Arts Complex, constructed in 1989; and in 2005 a large indoor recreation venue and performing arts centre was built, overlooking No. 1 Oval. In 2011, the Trade Training Centre near the Fitz Oval was completed.

The number of College Houses was increased from four to six in the 1980s.

Echoes from St Stanislaus'

Since the arrival of the Vincentians in 1889, the college's annual publication, Echoes from St Stanislaus' College, now known simply as Echoes has been published nearly every year. There were gaps of several years during World War I and World War II. In 1989 A Century of Echoes was published.

Stannies Old Boys Association

The Association is a separate legal entity to the college and has a role in organizing reunions and administrating the 'Stannies Old Boys Bursary Fund'. There is a tradition of holding class reunions; the year after finishing Year 12; at five year intervals; or at special anniversaries, usually on decade intervals since finishing Year 12. The Bursary Fund is used to contribute to the cost of annual College fees for boys with good academic potential and personal qualities. The precursor of the Association was the "Sydney Union of St Stanislaus' Old Boys", founded on 22 April 1903.

== Co-Curricular ==
Students at St Stanislaus' College are offered a variety of co-curricular activities to participate in including:

- Visual Arts Club (SADA)
- Annual Musical – in collaboration with MacKillop College
- College Play
- Crew Club (stage production, sound and lighting)
- Stage Band, Concert Band, Drum Corps and Vocal Group
- Cantor Group
- Agriculture Club
- Agricultural Show Team
- Chess Club
- Public Speaking and Debating
- Spelling Bee
- Robotics Club
- Indigenous Culture Group
- St Vincent de Paul Youth Conference
- Project Inspire (Year 10) and Unleashing Brilliance (Years 7–9) – academic extension program
- Media Team – photography and live stream

=== Sport ===
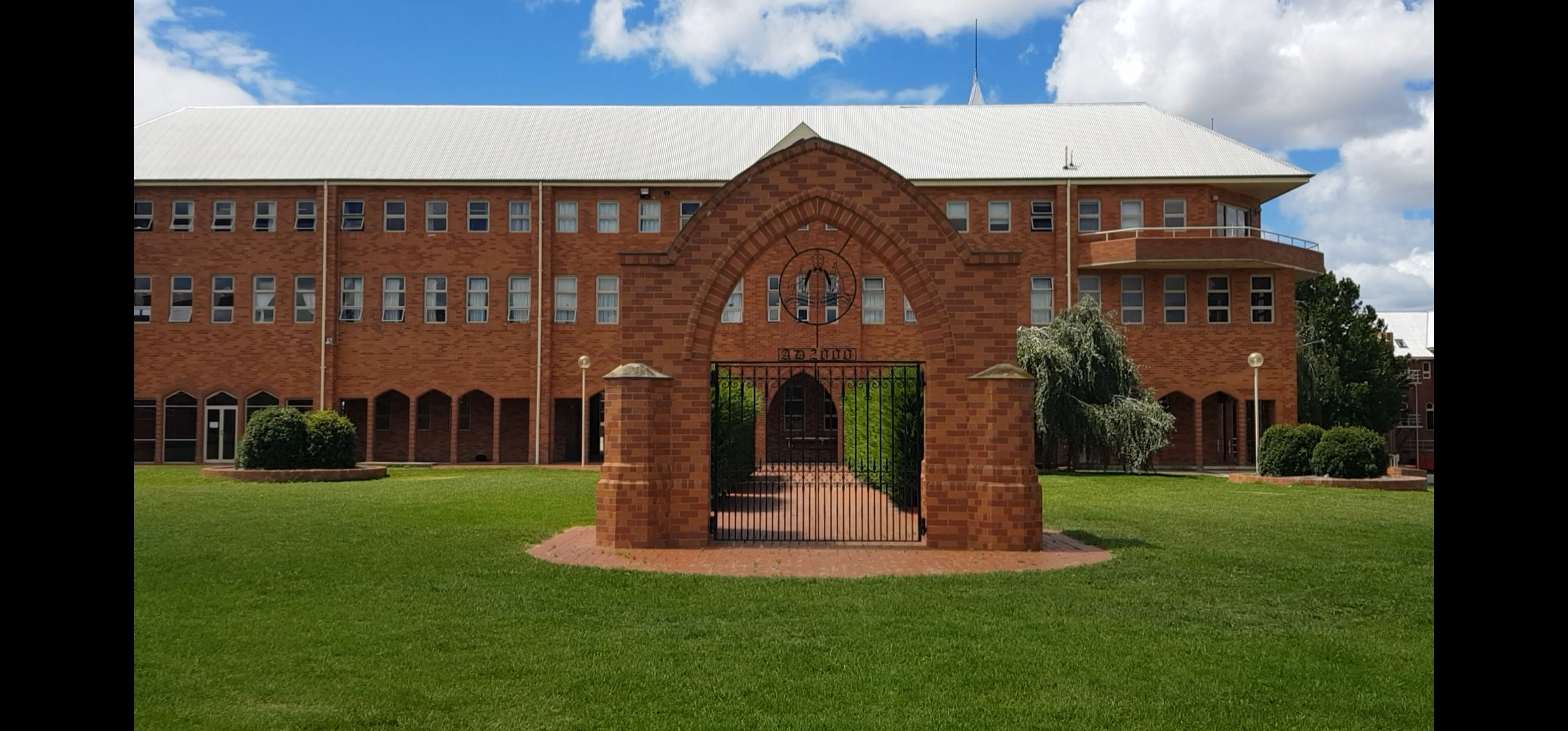
The Millennium Gates are situated at the college end of the No. 1 Oval. Rugby teams that play on the No. 1 Oval run through these gates at the start of the game.

St Stanislaus' College is a full member of the Independent Sporting Association (ISA) and offers a variety of co-curricular sport offerings including:

- Athletics
- Cross Country running
- Basketball
- Cricket
- Rugby
- Rugby League
- Football/Soccer
- Swimming
- Tennis
- Touch Football
- Equestrian Team

== College Chapel ==
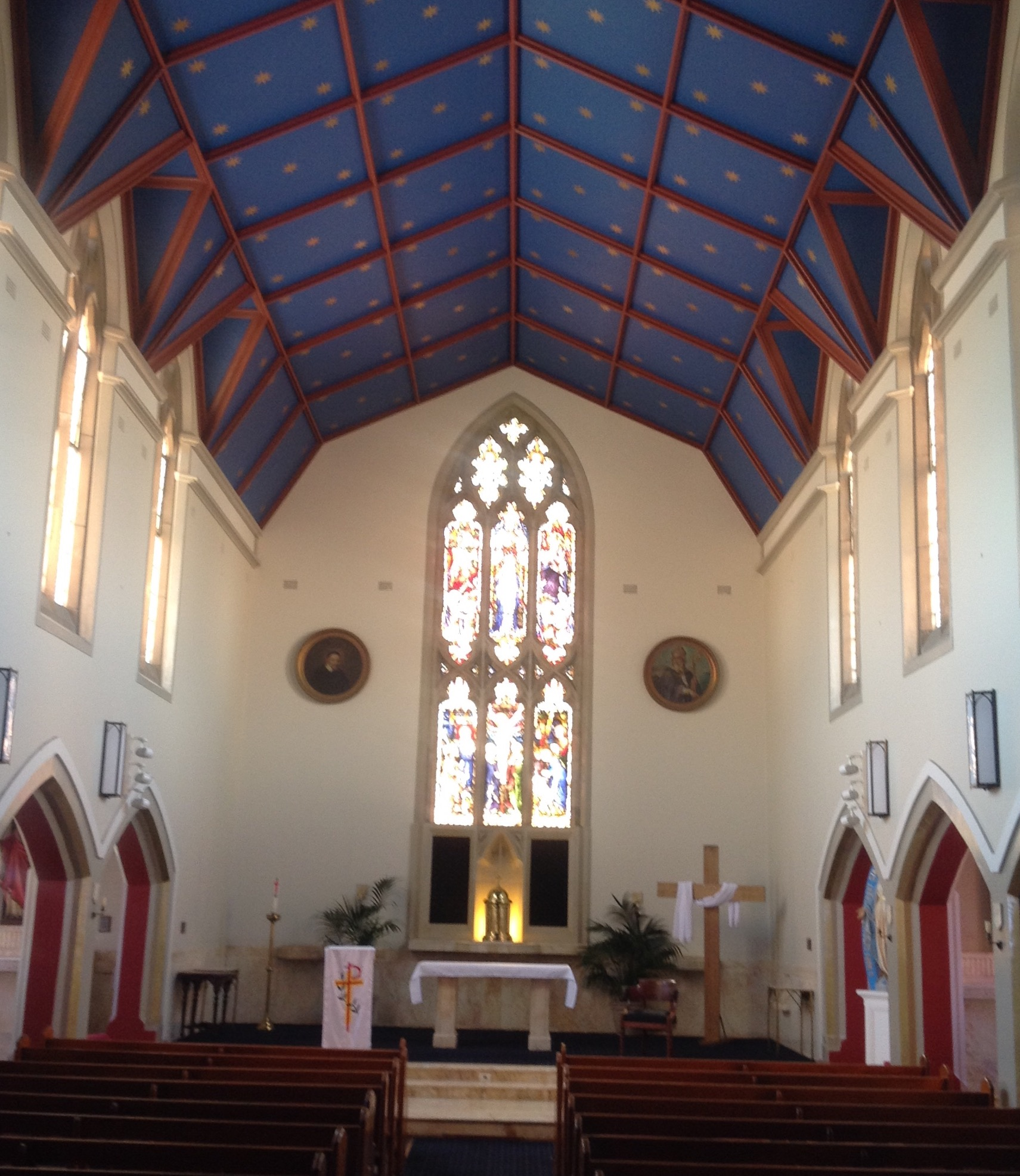
Interior of the chapel at St Stanislaus' College

The chapel, part of the original building, was extended in 1954. Due to problems with the ceiling it was renovated in recent years, reopening during 2013.

The main stained-glass window depicts the trinity, angels, and several Mysteries of the Rosary: the Annunciation (including part the greeting of the Angel Gabriel to Mary in Latin, Ave Maria gratia plena, i.e., "Hail Mary full of grace"), the Nativity, the Crucifixion and the Coronation of Mary as Queen of Heaven (including the opening words of the Latin hymn "Regina Caeli Laetare...", i.e., "Queen of Heaven, rejoice..."). The two side-altars feature two beautiful Hardman & Co. stained-glass windows each. There are two series of stained-glass windows at the sides of the chapel. Towards the front the windows represent the College House patron saints. Behind these are symbolised the Four Evangelists.

Two circular paintings have graced the chapel wall on either side of the main window for many years: St Vincent de Paul to the left, and Saint Patrick to the right.

== Leadership ==
=== Presidents ===
The following individuals have served as presidents of St Stanislaus' College:

Order	Name	Religious affiliation	Term began	Term ended	Time in office	Notes
1	Rev. James McGirr	Diocesan	1867	early 1871	3–4 years	
2	Rev. Joseph Horan	Diocesan	early 1871	1873	2–3 years	
3	Rev. Dr John McAuliffe	Diocesan	1874	August 1878	4–5 years	
−	Rev. Joseph Horan	Diocesan	August 1878	1882	3–4 years	
4	Rev. Pierce Corcoran	Diocesan	1883	1883	0–1 year	
5	Rev. Dr Joseph P. Byrne	Diocesan	1884	1884	0–1 year	
6	Rev. William Byrne	Diocesan	1885	1888	3–4 years	
7	Rev. J. Byrne CM	Vincentian	1889	1903	14–15 years	
8	Rev. M. J. O'Reilly CM	Vincentian	1903	1915	12–13 years	
9	Rev. J. M. Lowe CM	Vincentian	1915	1921	6–7 years	
10	Rev. John T. Hall CM	Vincentian	1921	1927	6–7 years	
11	Rev. E. Gallagher CM	Vincentian	1927	1934	7–8 years	
12	Rev. F. D. King CM	Vincentian	1934	1940	6–7 years	
−	Rev. E. Gallagher CM	Vincentian	1941	1946	5–6 years	
13	Rev. M. Howard CM	Vincentian	1947	1953	6–7 years	
14	Rev. R. McDonnell CM	Vincentian	1954	1959	5–6 years	
15	Rev. J. O'Neill CM	Vincentian	1960	May 1961	1–2 years	
16	Rev. Joseph Keady CM	Vincentian	May 1961	1966	5–6 years	
17	Rev. J. A. Maloney CM	Vincentian	1967	1973	6–7 years	
−	Rev. Joseph Keady CM	Vincentian	1974	1979	5–6 years	
18	Bro. Peter Dwyer CM	Vincentian	1980	1992	12–13 years	
19	Rev. Tom Finn CM	Vincentian	1993	1998	5–6 years	
20	Rev. Anthony Mannix CM	Vincentian	1999	2002	10–11 years	
21	Rev. Maurice Sullivan CM	Vincentian	2003	2004	1–2 years	
22	Rev. Doug Akehurst CM	Vincentian	2005	September 2015	10–11 years	

=== Heads of College ===
The following individuals have served as heads of St Stanislaus' College:

Order	Name	Title	Term begin	Term end	Time in office	Notes
1	Michael McGirr	Headmaster	1867	1872	5–6 years	
2	John F. Edwards	Head of College	1993	2012	19–20 years	
3	Dr. Anne Wenham	Head of College	2013	2019	6–7 years	
4	Mr Lindsay Fuhrman-Luck	Head of College	2020	incumbent	5–6 years	

== Child sexual abuse ==
During 2007, former priests, chaplains and teachers came under investigation over alleged child sexual abuse that up to 40 boys were allegedly sexually abused at the school from the 1960s through to the early 1990s.

Several people associated with St Stanislaus' College have faced legal proceedings due to alleged sexual abuse:

1. Brian Spillane, an ordained priest, was initially charged by police in 2008 with 33 sexual abuse offences, including six counts of sexual intercourse with pupils from St Stanislaus' College. In 2009, he was charged with a further 113 offences. On a separate matter, Spillane was convicted in November 2010 of nine counts of indecent assault against three girls aged between eight and seventeen while he was based in both Bathurst and Sydney, for which he was sentenced to nine years jail in 2012 with a non-parole period of five years. After a court-ordered media blackout was lifted dating from 2013, it was reported in 2016 that Spillane was convicted of assaults on five St Stanislaus' College students after a trial in 2013, that in 2015 he pleaded guilty to assaults on four boys at the school in the late 1980s, and during 2016 Spillane was convicted of attacks on five students between 1974 and 1990. Spillane was sentenced in early 2017 for the latest offending, and is serving a total of 25 years imprisonment with a non-parole period of sixteen and a half years.
2. Kevin Phillips, also an ordained priest, pleaded guilty to four counts of gross indecency with a child under the age of 18, resulting in concurrent sentences of 9 months under the first three charges, and an additional 9 months for the fourth.
3. John Gaven, a Vincentian Brother, was charged with 28 sex offences; and in March 2013 was found guilty on six sexual assault charges against former students.
4. Along with Spillane, Phillips and Gaven, one other man has been charged with sexual abuse cases related to the school: with five counts of indecent assault and one count of sexual assault.
5. Glenn Michael Humphreys, an ordained priest, was found guilty by a District Court jury of sexual assault offences against St Stanislaus' College students during the 1970s and 1980s. Humphreys was sentenced in June 2018 to a minimum custodial term of three and a half years.

== Notable alumni ==
The following individuals have been educated or served as staff members of St Stanislaus' College and St Charles' Seminary. They are listed with the years at College in brackets, where known.

Clergy and Brothers

- Dom Richard Hugh Connolly OSB (1889) – a monk of Downside Abbey and a major contributor to Syriac scholarship (1873–1948)
- Most Rev Patrick Vincent Dwyer (c. 1867–c. 1874) – Bishop of Maitland, 1909–1931
- Rev Fr Chris Middleton SJ (1970–1975) – Rector and Deputy Headmaster, St Ignatius' College Athelstone, Adelaide, 1998–2002; Principal, St Aloysius College, Sydney, 2003–2014; Rector, Xavier College, Melbourne, since June 2014
- Most Rev Patrick O'Regan (c. 1971–1976) – Bishop of Sale, Archbishop of Adelaide

Entertainment and the arts

- John O'Grady (c. 1920s) – an author with works including the comic novel They're a Weird Mob
- Damien Parer (c. 1930) – Australian war photographer
- Bill Peach (c. 1940s) – ABC television journalist and host of This Day Tonight
- Ainsley Melham (2009) – Broadway actor

Military

- Leslie John Roberts Jones (c. 1900s) – RAAF pilot, aeronautical engineer
- Ray Parer (c. 1910s) – RAAF pilot, aviator and adventurer

Politics and the law

- Francis Clarke (c. 1870s) – Member for Macleay and later the inaugural Member for Cowper
- Hon. Wilfred Herbert Augustine Collins LLB – Former Judge of the Supreme Court of New South Wales.
- Paddy Crick (c. 1870s) – a politician, solicitor and newspaper proprietor
- Jim Curran (c. 1940s) – Member for Castlereagh
- J. J. Dalton (c. 1870s) – Irish Nationalist Member of the UK Parliament, 1890–92
- Tony Kelly (c. 1970s) – Former Minister in the Rees and Keneally governments
- William Patrick Kelly (c. 1880s) – Member of the Legislative Council of New South Wales
- Greg McGirr (c. 1890s) – Member for Yass, Cootamundra, and later Sydney
- James McGirr (c. 1900s) – 28th Premier of New South Wales
- Richard Meagher (c. 1880s) – Speaker of the Legislative Assembly and later Member of the Legislative Council of New South Wales (also attended St Aloysius' College)

Public service

- Sir Peter Lawler OBE (c. 1933) – an Australian senior public servant and diplomat

John Lawler AM, APM (1973–1974) – 34-year career in law enforcement, including for CEO of the Australian Crime Commission; son of Sir Peter Lawler

- Charles St John Mulholland (1916–1920) – geologist and public servant

Science

- Dr James Fitzpatrick – Australian paediatrician; 2001 Young Australian of the Year
- Leslie J. R. Jones – aeronautical engineer (1886–1970)
- Esmond Venner Keogh – medical scientist, administrator and soldier (1895–1970)
- Pat Moran (1930–1933) – statistician

Sport

- Mick Clifford (1927–1933) – rugby union international player
- Herbert Daly (1899) – rugby union international player
- James Grant (1981–1982) – rugby union international player
- Tim Lane (1976–1977) – rugby union international player
- James McLaren (1984–1990) – Scottish dual-code international rugby league and rugby union
- Ron Quinton OAM (1961–1963) – jockey and race horse trainer
- Mark Renshaw (1997–1998) – Australian national cyclist
- Marty Roebuck (1977–1982) – rugby union international player
- Peter Toohey (1966–1971) – Australian test cricketer
- Jim White (1899–1903) – rugby union international player
- Jack Besgrove (2017–2022) – Australian world champion softballer
- Bo Abra (2017) – rugby union Super Rugby player
- Tom Hooper (rugby union) (2013-2018) - Current rugby union Super Rugby and International Player

Notable past staff members

- Rev Fr Maurice Joseph O'Reilly CM – President 1903–1915; after his time at St Stanislaus' he became Rector of St John's College, University of Sydney. He was a controversialist, journal editor, poet and an apologist for the Catholic faith (1866–1933)
- Rev Fr Joseph Slattery CM – an alumnus of St Charles' Seminary and taught at St Stanislaus'; a Vincentian priest, physicist, radiologist and a pioneer in the field of radiography in Australia

== See also ==
- List of Catholic schools in New South Wales
- List of boarding schools in Australia
- Catholic education in Australia
- List of non-government schools in New South Wales
