= Patrick Dougherty (bishop) =

Australian suffragan bishop

The Most Right Reverend Patrick Dougherty
- 7th Roman Catholic Bishop
- Diocese: Diocese of Bathurst
- Installed: 1 September 1983
- Term ended: 11 November 2008
- Predecessor: A. R. E. Thomas
- Successor: Michael McKenna
- Other posts: President of St Laurence O'Toole's Seminary, Dublin (1859–1865)

Orders
- Ordination: 7 December 1954 by Pietro Sigismondi
- Consecration: 8 December 1976 by Thomas Cahill

Personal details
- Born: 21 November 1931 Kensington, New South Wales, Australia
- Died: 30 August 2010 (aged 78) Bathurst, New South Wales
- Buried: Bathurst Cemetery, Bathurst, New South Wales
- Denomination: Roman Catholic Church
- Parents: William and Madge Dougherty
- Occupation: Roman Catholic bishop
- Profession: Cleric
- Education: Waverley College; St Columba's College, Springwood; St Patrick's Seminary, Manly; Propaganda College and Pontifical Urban University, both in Rome
- Motto: Iuxta Crucem Discipulus (at the Cross, the disciple)

Patrick Dougherty (21 November 1931 in Kensington, New South Wales – 30 August 2010 in Bathurst, New South Wales), an Australian suffragan bishop, was the seventh bishop of the Roman Catholic Diocese of Bathurst, serving for 25 years from 1983 until his retirement in 2008.

== Early years and background ==
The second of four sons (three of whom became priests) born to William and Madge Dougherty, Dougherty was educated at Our Lady of the Rosary school, Kensington and Waverley College, before completing his secondary education at St Columba's College in Springwood in 1948. He commenced studying for the priesthood, and in 1950 progressed to St Patrick's Seminary, Manly and then Propaganda College, Rome where he was ordained a priest by Archbishop Pietro Sigismondi on 7 December 1954.

In 1957 Dougherty obtained his Doctorate of Divinity in spiritual theology from the Pontifical Urban University in Rome, and immediately returned to Australia and was appointed assistant priest of St. Mel's in Campsie. At the request of Cardinal Gilroy, Dougherty travelled to Rome in 1958 and began to research the life of the Venerable Mother Mary Potter, foundress of The Little Company of Mary. Between 1959 and 1961, Dougherty was a lecturer in logic, history of philosophy, Latin and Italian at St Columba's Seminary in Springwood, where he was also a dean of students and in 1961 director of the Spiritual Year for first year students. In early 1962, Dougherty returned to Rome as an assistant vice rector of his alma mater, Propaganda College, and by 1967 was appointed a vice rector of the college. His book, Mother Mary Potter, foundress of the Little Company of Mary was published in 1963.

Dougherty returned to Australia in August 1970 to take up appointment to the newly established Secretariat of the Australian Episcopal Conference in Canberra. On 15 October 1976, Dougherty was elected as an auxiliary bishop of the Canberra and Goulburn Archdiocese and titular bishop of Lete, Mygdonia, a Roman Catholic titular see in the Roman province of Macedonia. Dougherty was consecrated as a bishop by Archbishop Thomas Cahill on 8 December 1976 in St Christopher's Cathedral, Canberra.

== Roman Catholic Bishop of Bathurst ==
In 1983 Bishop Dougherty was appointed as bishop of the Diocese of Bathurst and was installed on 5 October 1983. After 25 years in office, he retired on 11 November 2008 and was elevated to the title of bishop emeritus of Bathurst. In a very unusual move by Dougherty, on the day before his retirement was announced, he issued a statement denouncing a booklet written by a priest of his diocese. The openly heretical booklet entitled God is Big. Real Big! by Father Peter Dresser, apparently denied the divinity of Jesus Christ.

In 2009, Dougherty, together with George Cardinal Pell and bishop emeritus of Sale, Jeremiah Coffey, consecrated Michael McKenna as bishop of Bathurst.

Dougherty resided in Bathurst until his death from lung cancer at St Catherine's Aged Care facility on 30 August 2010 following a short illness. The Solemn Pontifical Mass was celebrated by twenty bishops, including Bishop McKenna, Cardinal Pell, and the Papal Nuncio to Australia, Archbishop Lazzarotto, and more than sixty priests. During the numerous eulogies at the mass, it was reported that Dougherty was considered a "... very humble and deeply spiritual man whose witness and example were a source of inspiration for all in the diocese of Bathurst". He was "... undoubtedly good, considerate and compassionate. He was a very kind man."

== Selected works ==
- Dougherty, Patrick (1963). Mother Mary Potter, foundress of the Little Company of Mary, 1847–1913. London: Sands. p. 304.

Catholic Church titles
Preceded by A. R. E. Thomas	7th Catholic Bishop of Bathurst; 1983–2008	Succeeded by Michael McKenna
