= John Norton (bishop) =

Bishop of the Roman Catholic Diocese of Bathurst, Australia

John Francis Norton (1891-1963) was an Irish-born Catholic missionary priest who served as Bishop of the Roman Catholic Diocese of Bathurst in Australia.

John Norton was born in Lucan, Co. Dublin, 1891, and educated at the Christian Brothers, James's Street, Dublin, before going to the Jesuit Mungret College Limerick, from 1905 until 1909. From Mungret he went to All Hallows College, Dublin, to train as a missionary priest, completing his Philosophy and Theology studies. In 1911 Norton was awarded a BA degree from the newly formed National University of Ireland.

Shortly after his ordination in 1915 he joined the Diocese of Bathurst, NSW, Australia, where he served as Cathedral administrator. He was ordained co-adjuator bishop of Bathurst in 1926, and succeeded Dr. O'Farrell as Bishop in 1928.

On 28 October 1958, Dublin City Council granted the Honorary Freedom of the City of Dublin to Most Rev. Dr. John F. Norton, when he was on a return visit to his native city. He also visited and address seminarians on ordination day, in his alma mater, All Hallows. Bishop Norton was also awarded an honorary LLD degree from the National University of Ireland in 1958.

Bishop Norton died aged 72 in 1963.
