= Diocese of Bathurst (Australia) =

Catholic ecclesiastical territory

Diocese of Bathurst (in Australia) Dioecesis Bathurstensis
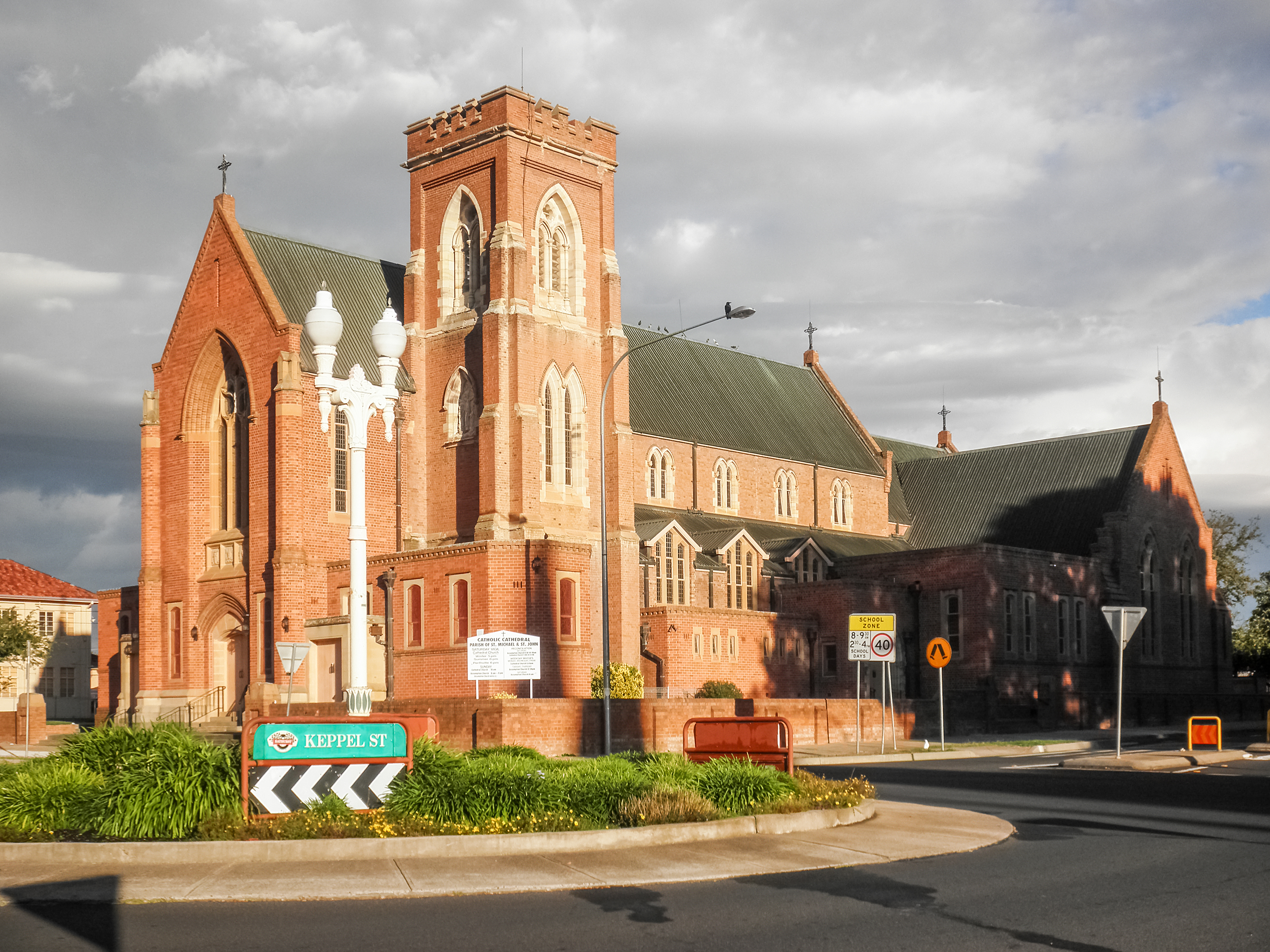
- St Michael and St John's Cathedral, Bathurst; consecrated in 1861

Location
- Country: Australia
- Territory: Central West and Orana, New South Wales
- Metropolitan: Archdiocese of Sydney
- Coordinates: 33°25′08″S 149°34′35″E

Statistics
- Area: 103,560 km^{2} (39,980 sq mi)
- Population: Total; Catholics: (as of 2020); ▼232,701; ▲65,681 (▲28.2%)
- Parishes: 21

Information
- Denomination: Catholic Church
- Sui iuris church: Latin Church
- Rite: Roman Rite
- Established: 20 June 1865
- Cathedral: St Michael and St John's Cathedral

Current leadership
- Pope: Leo XIV
- Bishop: Michael McKenna
- Metropolitan Archbishop: Anthony Fisher OP

Website
- Catholic Diocese of Bathurst

for namesakes, see Diocese of Bathurst

The Roman Catholic Diocese of Bathurst (Australia) is a Latin Church suffragan diocese of the Metropolitan Archdiocese of Sydney, established in 1865, covering the Central West and Orana regions of New South Wales, Australia.

The Cathedral of St Michael and St John the Baptist is the episcopal see of the Bishop of Bathurst, presently Michael McKenna.

== History ==
The Diocese of Bathurst was erected by Pope Pius IX on 20 June 1865. Prior to this date, the area was considered within the jurisdiction of the Archdiocese of Sydney, its present Metropolitan.

According to Roman Catholic Church records, the first Mass to be celebrated near Bathurst, was by John Therry in early November 1830, when he was called from Sydney to attend the execution of a convict. In July 1838, Michael O'Reilly and Thomas Slattery arrived from Ireland and were appointed to Bathurst, now established as a new church district and covered an area of 26 stations from Mt Victoria, Mudgee, Bathurst, through to Wellington and Dubbo. In June 1841, Dean O'Reilly visited Wellington and Dubbo, the first recorded visit of a priest to these districts. The area of the Bathurst mission was broken down in size as new mission centres opened. Hartley/Lithgow was already recognised as a mission centre as far back as 1842; Carcoar (1847), Sofala (1851), Mudgee (1852), Wellington (1856) and Orange (1864).

With a Catholic population of 535, towards the end of 1839 work was commenced on the parish church situated on the corner of George and Keppel Streets – St. Michael's. The Parish of Bathurst was created in 1839 and St. Michael's was opened for worship in the middle of 1841, though its building was not completed for a further two years. After about 10 years, subsidence made it unfit for public worship. By 1853, Catholic schools in Bathurst had a roll call of 90 boys and 130 girls. Arriving that year, Dean Grant was to devote eight years of his life to the building and development of the Catholic Church in the Bathurst district and it was his responsibility to raise the funds needed for the proposed new cathedral. Work was also begun on new churches in Peel and O'Connell at this time.

1865 saw Bathurst become a separate diocese with the appointment of Matthew Quinn as the first bishop. The area covered by the diocese changed little from when it was a mission in 1841, which extended from the River Murray to Queensland, and from the Blue Mountains to the border of South Australia, except that in on 10 May 1887 it lost territory to establish the Roman Catholic Diocese of Wilcannia, to which more territory was lost in 1917, when it was renamed Roman Catholic Diocese of Wilcannia-Forbes.

The Patrician Brothers were involved in education in the diocese until expelled in the 1920s.

== Bishops ==
The following individuals have been elected as Roman Catholic Bishop of Bathurst:

Order	Name	Date installed	Term ended	Term of office	Reason for term end
1	Matthew Quinn	1 November 1866	16 January 1885	18 years, 76 days	Died in office
2	Joseph Byrne	9 August 1885	12 January 1901	15 years, 156 days	Died in office
3	John Dunne	12 January 1901	22 August 1919	18 years, 222 days	Died in office
4	Michael O'Farrell	16 June 1920	4 April 1928	7 years, 293 days	Died in office
5	John Francis Norton	3 April 1928	20 June 1963	35 years, 78 days	Died in office
6	A. R. E. Thomas	29 September 1963	12 April 1983	19 years, 195 days	Retired as Bishop Emeritus of Bathurst
7	Patrick Dougherty	1 September 1983	11 November 2008	25 years, 71 days	Retired as Bishop Emeritus of Bathurst
8	Michael McKenna	15 April 2009	present	17 years, 214 days	n/a

John Francis Norton was coadjutor bishop from 8 Mar 1926 to 3 Apr 1928, at which time he became bishop of this diocese.

=== Other priests of this diocese who became bishops ===
- Alfred Joseph Gummer, appointed Bishop of Geraldton in 1942
- Kevin Michael Manning, appointed Bishop of Armidale in 1991
- Patrick Michael O'Regan, appointed Bishop of Sale in 2014

== Extent ==
Today the diocese covers an area of 103,560 square kilometres (39,980 sq mi) and comprises the territory immediately west of the Great Dividing Range. The eastern boundary, except from Mt. Coricudgy by the Great Dividing Range southerly to Mt. Boonbourwa by a range generally south-easterly and then south-westerly, by a line west to the junction of Coorongooba and Running Stream Creeks, by Running Stream Creek downwards to Capertee River, by a line south and a line west to Mt. Canobla by a range generally south-westerly to the Great Dividing Range at Mt. McLean. The southern boundary is the Abercrombie and Lachlan Rivers (including West Cowra). The western boundary is the Eurow-Nyrang Mountains, the Harvey Range, a line from the junction of the Brummagen Creek and the Macquarie River to a point on the Macquarie River 16 km north of Warren, thence in a northerly straight line to a point on the Barwon River, 16 km west of Walgett. The northern boundary is a south-easterly line from this point on the Barwon River to the parish of Gunnedah.

=== Parishes ===
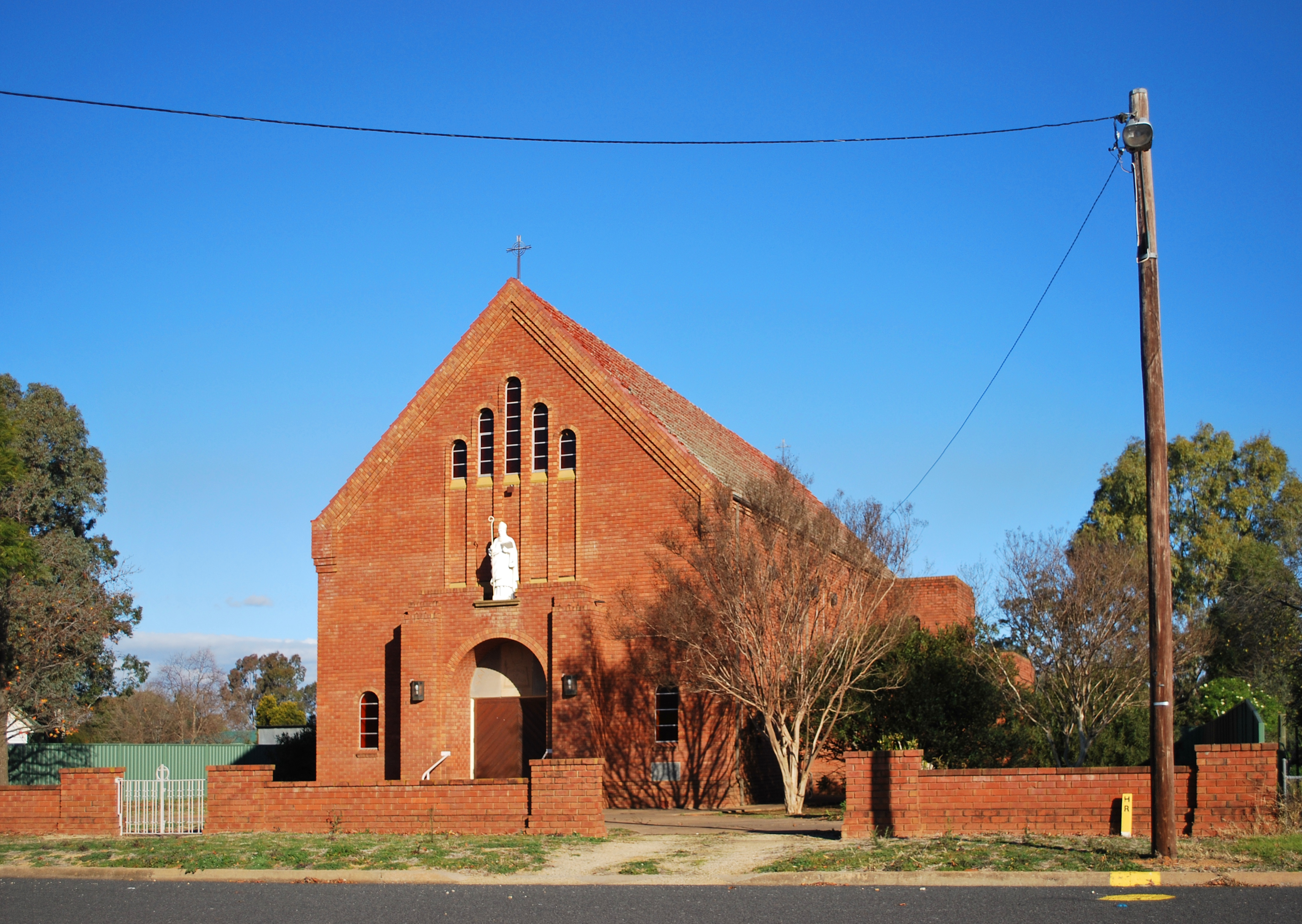
St Malachy's church at Gooloogong

The diocese has nineteen parishes with regular liturgical services held in the following locations, with churches dedicated to particular saints:

- Bathurst (Cathedral of St Michael and St John and The Assumption Church), and Burraga, Perthville, Rockley, Trunkey Creek, and Wattle Flat
- Blayney (St James), Carcoar (Immaculate Conception), Mandurama (St Laurence O'Toole), and Millthorpe (St Canice)
- Canowindra (St Edward) and Cargo (St Patrick)
- Coonabarabran (St Lawrence), Baradine (St John), and Binnaway (St Peter and St Paul)
- Cowra (St Raphael), Gooloogong (St Malachy), Woodstock (St Brigid), and Wyangala (St Vincent)
- Coonamble (Our Lady of Perpetual Help), Gulargambone, and Quambone
- Dubbo (St Brigid and St Laurence), Ballimore (Our Lady of Lourdes), and Geurie (Holy Name of Jesus)
- Dunedoo (St Michael), Coolah (Sacred Heart), Elong Elong (St Teresa of the Child Jesus), and Mendooran (St Mary)
- Eugowra (St John the Baptist) and Cudal (St Columbanus)
- Gilgandra (St Joseph), Collie (Holy Cross), and Tooraweenah (Immaculate Conception)
- Gulgong (St John the Baptist) and Goolma (St Francis Xavier)
- Kandos (St Dominic) and Rylstone
- Lithgow (St Patrick & St Francis Xavier)
- Mudgee (St Mary of the Presentation), Botobolar, and Windeyer
- Molong (Sacred Heart of St Lawrence O'Toole), Cumnock (St Dympna), and Manildra (St Michael)
- Oberon (St Ignatius) and Black Springs
- Orange (St Mary and St Joseph) and Mullion Creek (St Brendan)
- Portland (St Vincent) and Wallerawang (Sacred Heart)
- Wellington (St Patrick), Stuart Town, and Yeoval (Our Lady)

== Cathedral ==
In 1857, the foundation stone of St Michael and St. John's Cathedral was blessed by the Archbishop of Sydney, Dr John Polding OSB, with the blessing and opening in April 1861. The cathedral is located on the corner of Keppel and William Streets in Bathurst and is the sole cathedral church of the diocese. Commissioned by Dean Grant, the church was erected at a cost of £12,000 under the supervision of local architect, Edward Gell, initially dedicated to Saint John the Baptist. However, following the erection of the new diocese in 1865, the church was dedicated to dual saints as the cathedral church of the diocese.

The cathedral was built in the early English style, constructed with red brick and locally cut sandstone facings. The aisles are low with an attracting clerestory below. Gell's parish church terminated at the end of the nave with a small temporary chancel until such time as funds would allow for a more suitable sanctuary to be built. Over the next hundred years, the cathedral underwent several expansions. An adjoining convent complex appeared in about 1895. In 1897 the temporary chancel was replaced by a larger one more in keeping with the cathedral's status and it was at this time that the east windows and marble altar were also installed. In addition several structures were erected on the north side between 1897 and 1922. In honour of its centenary, the cathedral was extensively renovated and enlarged during 1960. As the mother church of one of the oldest dioceses in New South Wales, the cathedral has seen many changes over its lifetime making it truly a historical document in stone. In spite of all the changes however the cathedral is today substantially the same imposing building planned and built by Dean Grant as his visionary 'cathedral' for Bathurst over a century ago.

A high nave and a stained glass window by John Hardman & Co. dominate the west end. The tower, low in comparison to the nave, marks the old west end before a new narthex was added. The crenellated western tower is decorated by a clerestory, a tableau of the crucifixion and a statue of the Sacred Heart. The interior consists of an aisled nave with rounded sandstone piers and pointed Gothic arches which leads up to a distant sanctuary bathed in a mystical gloom. The wooden buttresses spring from corbells high on the walls in support of the open roof. The quasi-moorish arch and strainer beam is a result of the renovation as seen in a comparison with the original archway. The sanctuary is quite plain with the exception of the Sicilian marble altar introduced in 1897, from Dublin . The sanctuary is lit by two slim lancets placed in memory of Bishop Matthew Quinn, which show the Sacred Heart on the left and Saint Matthew on the right. Above is a trefoil which portrays the Holy Spirit. The marble altar is the focal point of the cathedral. After Vatican II the mensa was moved forward in order to accommodate the novus ordo with the bishop's throne and celebrant's chairs set behind it. The style of the altar is that of the pre-Vatican II era when the altar served both as the main focal point of the church and as the throne.

The retable with its extravagantly carved canopy and columned tabernacle in the shape of a church door remains in its place but the mensa has been moved forward to allow the bishop's throne and celebrant's chairs to be placed behind to allow the versus populam as prescribed by the new order of Mass. Of interest is the central panel showing one of the Stations of the Cross (Jesus falling). To the left of the chancel is the former nun's chancel now used as the Blessed Sacrament chapel and to the right is the south transept. To either side of the sanctuary proper are two more lancets representing Saint Joseph and Saint Mary. Standing before the Joseph window is a statue of Our Lady and before the Lady window is the Sacred Heart.

In 2011, it was reported that the repair work is necessary to restore the fabric of the building, in particular the bell tower, which has become unsafe. Some of the sandstone from the 1800s has not weathered well and shows extensive fretting and disintegration, while early brickwork, decorative stained glass windows and copper and slate roofing also need repairs. In addition there is rising damp in the south-west corner of the cathedral and concerns about sub-floor ventilation. A public appeal was launched with expectations of raising A$2.5 million with the work to be completed by 2015 when the diocese celebrates its sesqui-centenary and the city its bicentenary.

== Controversies ==
The Diocese of Bathurst, like many in Australia, has been part of the Catholic sexual abuse scandal, which are a series of convictions, trials and ongoing investigations into allegations of sex crimes committed by Catholic priests and members of religious orders.

The most notable institution in the diocese where convictions for sex crimes have been recorded is St Stanislaus' College in Bathurst. During the 1970s and 80's sex crimes against young boys and men occurred, instigated by religious clergy:

- In 2011, a conviction was recorded against William Stanley Irwin, a former Catholic brother, on two counts of gross indecency on a male under the age of 18.
- Kevin Francis Phillips, pleaded guilty in 2010 to four counts of gross indecency with a child under the age of 18; and was later sentenced to a total of 15 months jail.
- Brian Joseph Spillane also was convicted on 30 November 2010 on nine counts of indecent assault against three girls aged between eight and seventeen while he was based in Sydney in about 1979, a Vincentian priest at that time. During bail proceedings it was heard that Spillane faced a further 135 charges relating to alleged offences against boys at St Stanislaus' College whilst Spillaine was chaplain. After a court-ordered media blackout was lifted, in place since 2013, it was reported in 2016 that Spillane was convicted of assaults on five St Stanislaus' College students after a trial in 2013, and in 2015 he pleaded guilty to assaults on four boys at the school in the late 1980s. It was reported that during 2016 Spillane was convicted of attacks on five students between 1974 and 1990. Spillane, who is currently in custody, is expected to be sentenced in early 2017.

== See also ==
- Catholic Church in Australia
- Roman Catholic Diocese of Bathurst in Canada
- Anglican Diocese of Bathurst
