= Josephine Laffin =

Australian historian

- Education: University of Adelaide
- Known for: Matthew Beovich's biography
- Scientific career
- Fields: Christian spirituality, art history, biography
- Institutions: Australian Catholic University

Josephine Dene Laffin is an Australian historian and a senior lecturer in church history at Australian Catholic University. She is known for her research on Australian saints and clergymen, particularly Matthew Beovich.

== Books ==
- Matthew Beovich :A Biography, Wakefield Press, 2008
- The Duffer's Guide to Theology: The Tutorial Notes of Michael Alexander, London: Marshall Pickering, 1997
- The Duffer's Guide to the Old Testament, Zondervan, 1996
- Duffer's Guide to the Early Church, Zondervan, 1995
- True Confessions: The Early Church History Tutorial Notes of Michael Alexander, Adelaide: Openbook, 1993
- What Does it Mean to be a Saint?: Reflections on Mary Mackillop (Saints and Holiness in the Catholic Tradition), edited by Josephine Laffin, Wakefield Press, 2010

== See also ==
- Catholic peace traditions
- Religion in Australia
- James Gleeson (bishop)
- Andrew Killian
- John O'Reily
- Mary MacKillop
