= St Patrick's Church, Adelaide =

St Patrick's Church
- Church of St Patrick, Adelaide
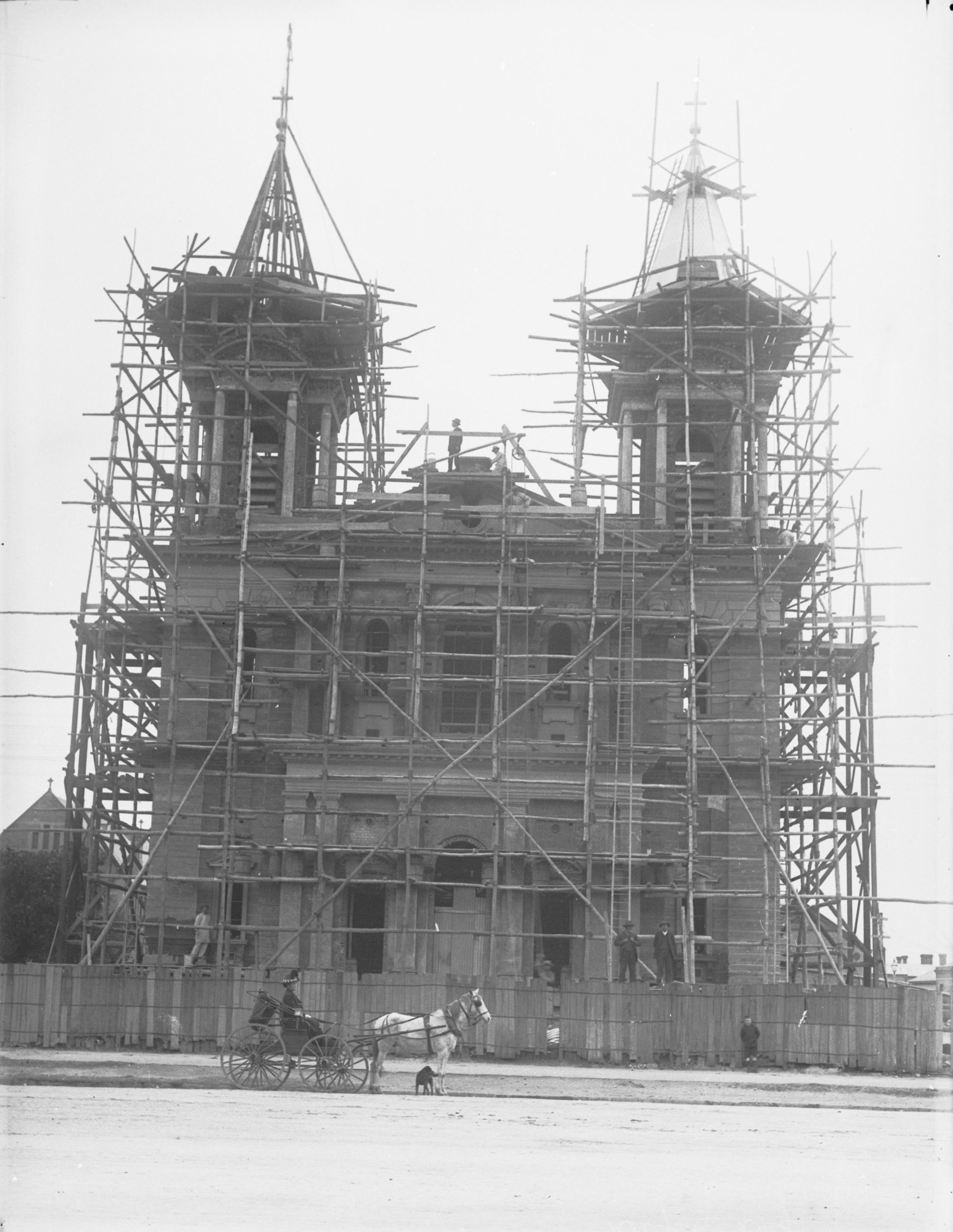
- Construction of St Patrick's Church in Grote Street, 1913-1914
- St Patrick's Church
- 34°55′45″S 138°35′22″E
- Location: 268 Grote Street, Adelaide, South Australia
- Country: Australia
- Denomination: Roman Catholic
- Website: adelcathparish.org

History
- Status: Church
- Consecrated: 15 March 1914

Architecture
- Architect: Walter Hervey Bagot (Woods and Bagot)
- Architectural type: Church
- Style: Classical Neo-Baroque
- Groundbreaking: 10 November 1912
- Completed: 15 March 1914
- Construction cost: £17,000

Administration
- Archdiocese: Adelaide
- Parish: Adelaide Cathedral Parish

Clergy
- Archbishop: Patrick O'Regan

St Patrick's Church is a heritage-listed Roman Catholic church on Grote Street, Adelaide, South Australia.

Opened in 1914, St Patrick's was built as a replacement for the original St. Patrick's church that was considered the first Catholic church in Adelaide. Today the church is a worship space by the Adelaide Catholic Cathedral Parish, and used for services in languages other than English, including Portuguese and Croatian.

== History ==
The foundation stone for the new church was laid on 10 November 1912 by then-Archbishop John O'Reily. A procession from St Francis Xavier's Cathedral involving men and youths from various parishes, the Guild Band, the Irish Piper's Band, and representatives of the Hibernian and Australian Catholic Benefit Society resulted in a large crowd, estimated at 10,000 people for the blessing of the stone. The church was opened on 15 March 1914 by Archbishop O'Reily and the first Mass was celebrated by Fr. Patrick Hurley.
