= Philip Kennedy (bishop) =

Australian Catholic bishop (1930–1983)

The Most Reverend Philip Kennedy
- Auxiliary bishop of Archdiocese of Adelaide
- Archdiocese: Adelaide
- Installed: 17 March 1973
- Term ended: 23 March 1983
- Other post: Titular Bishop of Ros Cré (1973–1983)

Orders
- Ordination: 30 June 1962 at St Francis Xavier's Cathedral, Adelaide by Matthew Beovich
- Consecration: 17 March 1973 at St Francis Xavier's Cathedral, Adelaide by James William Gleeson

Personal details
- Born: Philip James Anthony Kennedy; 21 August 1930 Mount Gambier, South Australia, Australia
- Died: 23 March 1983 (aged 52) Adelaide, Australia
- Denomination: Catholic Church
- Occupation: Catholic bishop

Philip James Anthony Kennedy (21 August 1930 – 23 March 1983) was an Australian bishop of the Catholic Church. He served for 10 years as auxiliary bishop of Adelaide.

== Early life ==
Kennedy was born in Mount Gambier. After graduating high school, he studied law at University of Adelaide before entering the Order of Cistercians of the Strict Observance at Tarrawarra Abbey. He subsequently studied for priesthood at St Francis Xavier Seminary.

== Priesthood ==
Kennedy was ordained a priest on 30 June 1962 at St Francis Xavier's Cathedral, Adelaide by Archbishop Matthew Beovich.

== Episcopate ==
On 29 January 1973, Pope Paul VI appointed him auxiliary bishop of Adelaide. He was ordained a bishop on 17 March 1973 by Archbishop James Gleeson. He was given the titular see of Ros Cré, the site of Mount St. Joseph Abbey, a nod to his Trappist roots.

== Death ==
Kennedy died on 23 March 1983 at the age of 52. He is buried in West Terrace Cemetery, Adelaide.

Catholic Church titles
Preceded by —	Auxiliary Bishop of Adelaide; 1973–1983	Succeeded by —
Preceded by Dominic Conway	Titular Bishop of Ros Cré; 1973–1983	Succeeded by Patrick Walsh
