= Blackfriars Priory School =

Coordinates: 34.8950°S 138.5958°E

Location
- 17 Prospect Road; Prospect, South Australia; Australia

Information
- Type: Private
- Motto: Deus Scientiarum Dominus ("The Lord is an all-knowing God")
- Religious affiliations: Roman Catholic (Dominican Friars)
- Established: 1953
- Chair: Giovanna Toldi
- Principal: David Ruggiero
- Chaplain: Matthew Luli
- Key people: Brett Knowles (deputy principal)
- Grades: Early Learning to Year 12
- Gender: Boys (Reception to Year 12); Co-educational (Early Learning)
- Enrolment: 850 (2026)
- Colours: Black; Cambridge blue
- Mascot: The Hounds
- Affiliations: International Boys' Schools Coalition
- Website: blackfriars.sa.edu.au

Blackfriars Priory School is a private Roman Catholic school for boys situated in Prospect, an inner-northern suburb of Adelaide, South Australia. It is conducted by the Dominican Friars of the Province of the Assumption.

== History ==
The Dominican Order established its presence in Australia in 1898 when five priests were entrusted with the Catholic parish of North Adelaide/Prospect in South Australia. The first superior of the community was Father Robert Spence OP, who later became Archbishop of Adelaide. From this foundation, Dominican communities were subsequently established in several Australian capital cities, later expanding into New Zealand. During the 1950s, the Australian Dominicans also undertook missionary work in the western Solomon Islands.

In the early 1950s, the Dominican Provincial, Father Mannes Cussen O.P., sought to expand the Order’s involvement in Catholic education. Having previously spent time with the Dominican school community in Newbridge, Ireland, Cussen advocated for the establishment of a Dominican school for boys in Adelaide, responding both to the Order’s educational mission and the growing demand for Catholic schooling following the population increase that occurred after the Second World War. Responsibility for identifying a suitable site was assigned to Father Jerome O’Rorke OP, then Prior of St Laurence’s Priory in North Adelaide.

The site ultimately selected was the Comonella estate at Prospect. The property had originally been constructed in 1880 as St Catharine’s by James Angas Johnson, who named it after his wife. In 1911, it was purchased by the Lewis family for £4,000 and renamed Comonella, after one of the family’s pastoral holdings. Following the death of John Lewis, a benefactor of the Dominican Order, ownership passed to his daughters Lena Lewis, Olive Kirchner and Margaret Lewis. Negotiations for the purchase of the property were completed by Father O’Rorke on behalf of the Dominicans in late 1951.

Preparations for the establishment of the new school began shortly thereafter. Renovation and construction works were undertaken with assistance from benefactors and volunteers from the Young Christian Workers (YCW) movement. Modifications included the construction of new classroom spaces, an external staircase, toilet facilities, and the conversion of former stables and outbuildings into teaching areas.

Blackfriars Priory School was formally blessed and opened on 25 January 1953 by Archbishop Matthew Beovich. The school commenced classes on 10 February 1953 with approximately 45 students enrolled across five classes, ranging from Grade 4 to First Year. The founding staff consisted of five Dominican priests and one lay brother, marking the beginning of Dominican secondary education at Blackfriars in Adelaide.

== Houses ==
=== Primary ===
From its earliest years, students at Blackfriars were assigned to one of three original school houses: Candler (red), Dowling (blue), and Spence (gold). These houses were named after prominent figures associated with the early development of the Catholic Church in South Australia and the establishment of the Dominican Order in Australia. As enrolments increased, a fourth house, Cussen (white), was introduced in 1961, continuing the established tradition of recognising individuals connected with local Dominican and Catholic history. These four houses continue to operate within the school’s primary years.

House name	Colour
Candler	Red
Cussen	White
Dowling	Blue
Spence	Gold

=== Secondary ===
During 1986 and 1987, Blackfriars introduced a new vertical house structure for students in the secondary school, replacing the earlier system with eight newly established houses. Under this arrangement, approximately twenty-five students drawn from different year levels are placed together in a single home group, creating mixed-age pastoral groups spanning Years 7 to 12. Three home groups combine to form a house. Students remain within the same home group throughout their secondary education.

The secondary school houses are named after notable members of the Dominican Order whose contributions to theology, education, missionary work and church history are considered significant within the tradition of the Order. Each house is assigned its own colours and flag, reflecting the historical figure for whom it is named.

House name	Colours
Aquinas	White and black
Burke	Black and gold
de Vitoria	Blue and green
Denifle	Red and white
Horten	Cambridge bridge and blue
Jarrett	Oxford blue and red
Lacordaire	Gold and red
Lagrange	Green and gold

=== 2027 changes ===
In April 2026, it was announced that from 2027 the school will move to four Reception to Year 12 houses, each inheriting the heritage and story of one of the current houses.

New house	Current houses
Albert	Candler, Denifle, Jarrett
Dominic	Cussen, Burke, Lacordaire
Thomas	Dowling, Aquinas, Horten
Vincent	Spence, de Vitoria, Lagrange

== Notable alumni ==
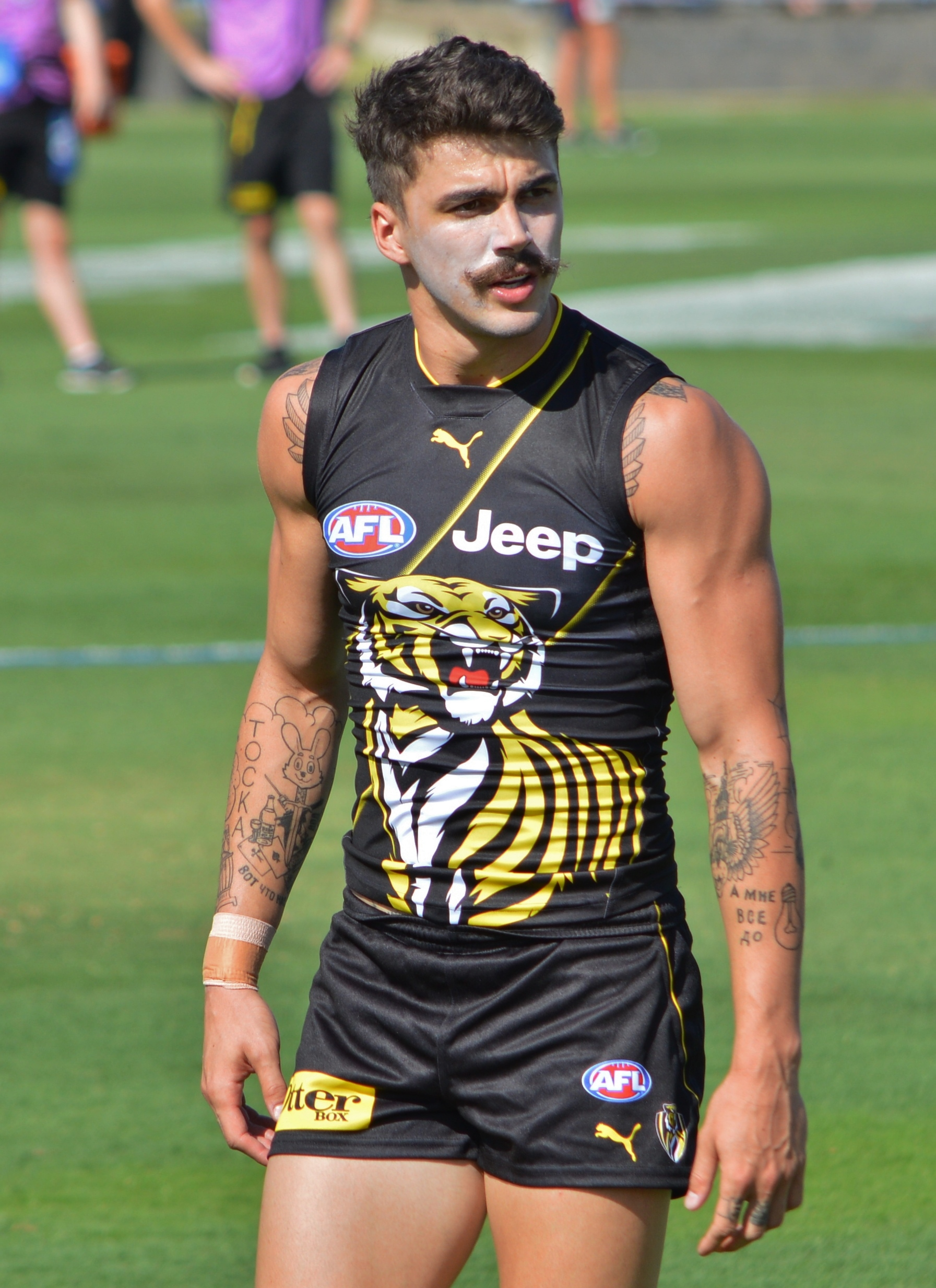
Oleg Markov

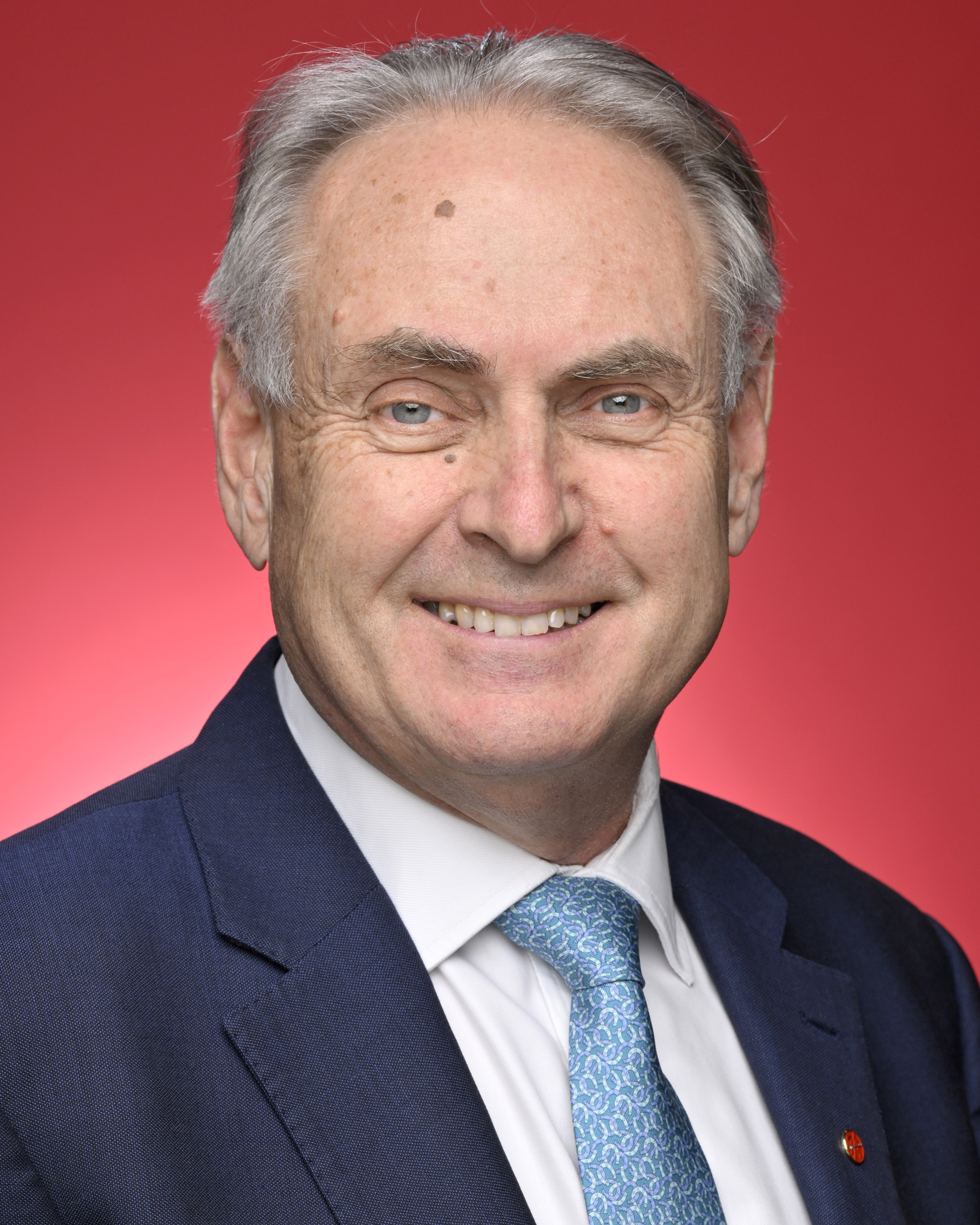
Don Farrell

=== Sport ===
- Carlo Armiento, soccer player
- Matthew Campbell, Australian rules footballer
- Alan Didak, Australian rules footballer
- Callum Ferguson, cricketer
- Ben Hart, Australian rules footballer
- Ben Holland, Australian rules footballer
- Nick Holland, Australian rules footballer
- Mark Jamar, Australian rules footballer
- Teeboy Kamara, soccer player
- Oleg Markov, Australian rules footballer
- Martin McKinnon, Australian rules footballer
- Joe Mullen, soccer player
- Sean Tasker, Australian rules footballer
- Boyd Woodcock, Australian rules footballer

=== Other ===
- Leon Bignell, politician
- Don Farrell, politician
- Harrison Gilbertson, actor
- David O'Loughlin, politician
- John Schumann, singer
- Jack Snelling, politician
