= Patrick O'Regan =

Patrick O'Regan may refer to:

- Patrick O'Regan (bishop) (born 1958), Australian Roman Catholic bishop
- Patrick O'Regan (politician) (1869–1947), New Zealand politician
