= Philip Wilson (bishop) =

Australian Roman Catholic archbishop (1950–2021)

The Most Reverend Philip Wilson
- Archbishop of Adelaide
- Archdiocese: Adelaide
- Appointed: 3 December 2001
- Term ended: 30 July 2018
- Predecessor: Leonard Faulkner
- Successor: Patrick O'Regan
- Previous posts: Bishop of Wollongong (1996–2001); President of the Australian Catholic Bishops' Conference (2006–2010)

Orders
- Ordination: 23 August 1975 by Edward Bede Clancy
- Consecration: 10 July 1996 by Edward Bede Clancy

Personal details
- Born: 2 October 1950 Cessnock, New South Wales
- Died: 17 January 2021 (aged 70) Adelaide, South Australia
- Denomination: Roman Catholic
- Parents: John and Joan Wilson
- Education: St Patrick's Seminary; Catholic Institute of Sydney; Catholic University of America

Styles of Philip Wilson
- Reference style: The Most Reverend
- Spoken style: Your Grace
- Religious style: Archbishop

Philip Edward Wilson (2 October 1950 – 17 January 2021) was an Australian Roman Catholic prelate who was the eighth Archbishop of Adelaide from 2001 to 2018. He was president of the Australian Catholic Bishops' Conference from 2006 to 2010. From 1996 to 2001, Wilson was bishop of the Diocese of Wollongong, where he gained a reputation as a "healing bishop" for handling child-abuse scandals.

In 2018, Wilson was at first convicted but then acquitted on appeal of failing to report in 2004 allegations of child sexual abuse against another priest when he was an assistant parish priest in East Maitland, New South Wales in 1976. After the conviction but before the acquittal, he resigned as archbishop and commenced serving his sentence under home detention. In September 2019 the fourth previously unreleased volume of the 2014 Special Commission of Enquiry into allegations of cover-up of sexual abuse claims in the Diocese of Maitland-Newcastle commissioned by Margaret Cuneen found that Wilson was an "unsatisfactory and unimpressive witness" and that he gave evidence the commissioners considered to be "untruthful" and "self serving and implausible".

== Early life ==
Wilson was born in Cessnock, New South Wales, to Joan and John Wilson. He was the eldest of five children and received his primary and secondary education at St Patrick's Primary School in Cessnock and St Joseph's College, Hunters Hill. By his mid-teens, Wilson had decided to enter the priesthood, and on his completion of high school, at the age of 18, he entered St Patrick's Seminary, Manly. In 1974, he received a Bachelor of Theology degree from the Catholic Institute of Sydney.

=== Priesthood ===
Following his ordination in 1975, Wilson's first posting was to the parish of East Maitland, New South Wales, where he served as an assistant priest. In 1977–78 he undertook studies in religious education in New York City. In 1978, he returned to Australia where he was appointed Director of Religious Education in the Diocese of Maitland (now the Diocese of Maitland-Newcastle). After being appointed parish priest of Maitland in 1983, he was promoted to vicar general, Diocesan Management and Administration in 1987. From 1990 to 1995, Wilson studied canon law at the Catholic University of America in Washington, D.C., where he received a Licentiate of Canon Law, and was made a Prelate of Honour by Pope John Paul II.

== Bishop of Wollongong ==
In 1996, Wilson was appointed to replace Bishop William Murray as Bishop of Wollongong, and on 10 July he was consecrated by Cardinal Edward Clancy. Aged 45, Wilson became the youngest Catholic bishop in Australia.

During his time as Bishop of Wollongong, Wilson was tasked with dealing with an alleged culture of inadequate responses to child abuse by clergy within the diocese. Wilson's predecessor, Bishop Murray, had been criticised during public hearings of the Wood Royal Commission for not acting on allegations of sexual misconduct within the diocese and had admitted publicly that he did not know how to deal with them. Upon the delivery of the findings of the Wood Commission, Wilson issued a formal apology to the victims of abuse by clergy within the diocese.

== Archbishop of Adelaide ==
In November 2000, Pope John Paul II appointed Wilson to the position of coadjutor archbishop of the Archdiocese of Adelaide, in anticipation of the retirement of Leonard Faulkner, who was Archbishop of Adelaide at the time. Aged only 50, Wilson's appointment made him the youngest Catholic archbishop in Australia. The announcement of Wilson's promotion brought praise from public figures in Wollongong, with the Lord Mayor saying he had "played a leading role in restoring the credibility of the Catholic Church here". Archbishop Faulkner described him as "a very pastoral man and a man of the people and very gifted academically".

Wilson's welcome Mass, held at Adelaide's St Francis Xavier's Cathedral on 1 February 2001, was the first Mass in Australia to be broadcast on the internet, recording a reported 40,000 views. Wilson spent most of 2001 learning about the archdiocese while acting as coadjutor, and was installed at a Mass on 3 December, which was attended by about 35 bishops, more than 200 priests and the Governor of South Australia, Marjorie Jackson-Nelson. He celebrated Mass for the first time at St Francis Xavier's Cathedral on 9 December 2001.

In 2002, Wilson became the first Australian archbishop to be invited to address a session of the United States Conference of Catholic Bishops. The session was held in the wake of an emergency meeting between American bishops and Pope John Paul II regarding the sex-abuse crisis within the church. Wilson was selected to address the conference because of his experience dealing with clerical crimes while Bishop of Wollongong.

In 2018, Wilson was charged, convicted and later acquitted on appeal of concealing child sex abuse. He was alleged to have been told in 1976 by a victim who had been sexually abused four years earlier. While awaiting sentencing, Wilson stepped aside from his duties as archbishop in late May 2018. On 3 June 2018, Wilson's duties were assumed by Gregory O'Kelly, Bishop of Port Pirie, South Australia.

Wilson submitted his resignation to Pope Francis on 20 July, following conviction for failure to report child sexual abuse. Its acceptance was announced on 30 July 2018. His conviction was overturned by the District Court of New South Wales in December 2018.

== Alleged failure to report child sexual abuse ==
In May 2010, Wilson came under scrutiny for his handling of charges of clerical sexual abuse in two cases in the Diocese of Maitland-Newcastle.

The first case originated in 1985, when Father Dennis McAlinden, a priest in that diocese, was alleged to have sexually assaulted two girls. Wilson, the diocese's vicar general at the time, was sent to speak to parents at the school where the assault was alleged to have taken place. The principal told the media that Wilson responded by removing McAlinden from his position and providing help for him. The Australian Broadcasting Corporation (ABC) reported that "McAlinden was ... transferred to a remote parish in the Pilbara region of Western Australia. Over the next decade he sexually assaulted five more girls under the age of 10". Ten years later, in 1995, Bishop Leo Clarke (1923–2006) asked Wilson to take statements from McAlinden's alleged victims. Wilson took the statements and returned them to the bishop. The ABC reported that the statements were never provided to police and that Clarke defrocked McAlinden with the promise "that his 'good name' would be protected". In a statement to ABC in 2010, Wilson said he told Clarke in 1985 that McAlinden should be confronted and, that as far as he was aware, this had occurred. He denied involvement in McAlinden's transfer to Western Australia or his defrocking.

The second allegations were made in mid-May 2010 by a victim of convicted child sex offender James Fletcher, who had also been a priest in the Maitland-Newcastle diocese. According to the ABC, "[The victim said] Archbishop Philip Wilson was a priest living in the bishop's house in Maitland when Fletcher was also living there in the late 1970s, and that Philip Wilson should have been aware that he was being sexually abused in Fletcher's upstairs bedroom." Wilson denied having any knowledge of the assault and said he had not been living in the house at the time, but in a flat behind the residence. The details of the charge were that Wilson should have remembered the 1976 disclosure to him, and reported it in 2004 when Fletcher was charged with other child sex abuse crimes.

=== Trial and conviction ===
In March 2015, NSW Police issued Wilson with a future court attendance notice. He faced a charge of "concealing a serious offence regarding child sexual abuse in the Hunter region" in 1976. Wilson immediately took indefinite leave and issued a statement saying he would "vigorously defend my innocence through the judicial system". Wilson returned to work at the beginning of 2016. His attorneys made several requests to have the court proceedings quashed or permanently stayed, including that Wilson had Alzheimer's disease and should not be tried on medical grounds. These were refused by a magistrate in February 2016, and the appeal was rejected by Justice Monika Schmidt in the Supreme Court of New South Wales on 14 October 2016, clearing the way for the trial to be heard. One of the alleged victims of abuse asked for the non-publication order on his name to be lifted, and spoke of having told Wilson of the abuse in 1981 when he was 15, five years after it occurred.

On 22 May 2018 the Newcastle Local Court found Wilson guilty of the charge of failing to report allegations of child sexual abuse by Fletcher in 1976. Wilson remained on bail pending his sentencing. The prosecution requested a custodial sentence for Wilson, for reasons of "deterrence" and "denunciation". The maximum penalty was two years' imprisonment, which could be suspended. After calls to resign as archbishop, the day after his conviction Wilson announced he was stepping aside from his duties, after putting in place administrative arrangements to manage the affairs of the archdiocese. Sentencing arguments were heard by the magistrate on 19 June 2018, with a decision reserved until 3 July 2018. The prosecution submitted documents that stated that 16 per cent of those convicted of concealing a serious indictable offence receive a full custodial sentence. Wilson's lawyers argued that Wilson could be the target of violence in prison, and sought a recorded conviction and good-behaviour bond. On 3 July 2018, Wilson was sentenced to 12 months' detention, eligible for parole after 6 months. The matter was adjourned until 14 August while a home detention order was assessed, whereby he would serve the sentence at a family member's home in New South Wales. Following his sentencing, Wilson appealed, and said he would not resign from his position until all legal avenues open to him were exhausted. On 19 July, Australian Prime Minister Malcolm Turnbull said he wanted "the ultimate authority in the church to take action and sack him".

=== Resignation ===
There were many calls for his resignation, but Wilson had said that he would not step aside until his legal options were exhausted. Pope Francis accepted Wilson's resignation on 30 July 2018 while his appeal against conviction remained in progress. As an archbishop, Wilson became the most senior Catholic cleric convicted of not disclosing abuse by another priest to police; earlier cases involved bishops Pierre Pican in France and Robert Finn in the U.S.

=== Sentence ===
On 14 August 2018, Magistrate Robert Stone determined that Wilson was not a threat and ordered him to serve home detention for the remainder of his one-year sentence. Wilson did not apply for bail following the ruling and immediately began serving his sentence. He would have been eligible for parole on 13 February 2019.

=== Appeal and acquittal ===
On 6 December 2018, Wilson was acquitted of all the charges of which he had previously been found guilty. Judge Roy Ellis of the Newcastle District Court, when handing down his decision, said that suspicion was not a substitute for proof and that Wilson was an intelligent and articulate witness that did not attempt to blacken the name of his accuser in his defence. Judge Ellis determined that for a conviction, the prosecution needed to prove beyond reasonable doubt that the conversation had taken place in 1976, that Wilson had believed it at the time, and remembered it in 2004. The District Court gave more weight to a written statement by another priest (Glen Walsh) who stated that in 2004 he had sought advice from Wilson about how to respond to being directed by the bishop at that time to hide another allegation against Fletcher. Ellis found it inconceivable that Wilson would advise Walsh to go to the authorities, if he also held information himself about another victim. The acquittal came after Wilson had already served four months of his 12 months of house arrest. Fletcher's victims expressed their extreme disappointment at Wilson's acquittal. The Director of Public Prosecutions had been reported to be considering a challenge in the Supreme Court of New South Wales but on 20 December, announced that there were no reasonable prospects of success of appeal on errors of law. In September 2019 the fourth previously unreleased volume of the 2014 Special Commission of Enquiry into allegations of cover-up of sexual abuse claims in the Diocese of Maitland-Newcastle commissioned by Margaret Cuneen found that Wilson was an "unsatisfactory and unimpressive witness" and that he gave evidence the commissioners considered to be "untruthful" as well as "self serving and implausible".

== Views ==
In 2017, during the Australian Marriage Law Postal Survey regarding same-sex marriage, Wilson was on the "No" side, defining marriage as being only "between a man and a woman" with "its fundamental role in raising children as part of God’s divine plan for the human family".

== Death ==
Wilson died on 17 January 2021. His health had been poor during his last years and he suffered from cancer, but his death was described as "sudden".

Catholic Church titles
Preceded by William Edward Murray	Bishop of Wollongong; 1996–2001	Succeeded by Peter Ingham
Preceded by Leonard Faulkner	Archbishop of Adelaide; 2001–2018	Succeeded by Patrick Regan
