= Leonard Faulkner =

Australian Catholic clergyman (1926–2018)

The Most Reverend Leonard Faulkner
- Archbishop of Adelaide
- Archdiocese: Catholic Archdiocese of Adelaide
- Installed: 19 June 1985
- Term ended: 3 December 2001
- Predecessor: James Gleeson
- Successor: Philip Wilson
- Other post: Bishop of Townsville (1967–1983)

Orders
- Ordination: 1 January 1950
- Consecration: 28 November 1967

Personal details
- Born: 5 December 1926 Booleroo Centre, Australia
- Died: 6 May 2018 (aged 91)

Leonard Anthony Faulkner (5 December 1926 – 6 May 2018) was an Australian Catholic clergyman and the seventh Archbishop of Adelaide. Born in rural South Australia, Faulkner served as an Adelaide parish priest and Bishop of Townsville before being appointed Archbishop of Adelaide in 1985. Upon retiring in 2001, he became Archbishop Emeritus of Adelaide.

== Early life ==
Faulkner was born in Booleroo Centre, South Australia, in 1926. The son of a farm labourer and the eldest of ten siblings, Faulkner did not begin to attend school until he was seven years old, as until then he was considered too young to walk the four kilometres from his house to the local school.

Faulkner was ordained on New Year's Day, 1950 in Rome, along with twelve other priests from around the world. His first posting was to the parish of Woodville, Seaton, Royal Park, and Albert Park in Adelaide, South Australia. He served as a chaplain within the Young Christian Workers movement until his consecration as Bishop of Townsville.

== Episcopacy ==
On 28 November 1967, Faulkner was consecrated as the bishop of Townsville in Queensland. In 1983 he returned to Adelaide to assist the ailing Archbishop James Gleeson, and in 1985 he was installed as Gleeson's successor. During his tenure as archbishop, Faulkner declined to live in the bishop's quarters, instead choosing to reside in a plain house in the Adelaide suburb of Netley.

=== Controversy regarding communal confession ===
In 1999, Faulkner caused controversy when he defied Vatican pressure to cease the practice of communal confession, wherein a priest may grant absolution without hearing individual confessions. Following a meeting with Australian bishops in late 1998, Pope John Paul II sent a letter to all Australian bishops outlining concerns with the relaxed nature of Australian Catholicism. In particular, he formally requested that the bishops eliminate the use of communal confession. While the dioceses of most other capital cities in the country abandoned the practice, Faulkner refused, allowing communal confession during Lent of 1999. In June 1999, Faulkner sent a pastoral message to all parishes in the Archdiocese of Adelaide allowing communal confession, but requiring prior approval from the Archbishop. This made Adelaide one of the few places in Australia where communal confession was still practised.

=== Retirement ===
In November 2000, Pope John Paul II appointed the bishop of Wollongong, Philip Wilson, to the position of coadjutor Archbishop of Adelaide, in doing so naming him as Faulkner's successor. On 3 December 2001, two days before his seventy-fifth birthday, Faulkner retired as archbishop, and Wilson was installed as his successor. As a retired Archbishop, Faulkner retained the title of Archbishop Emeritus. An autobiographical book based on his edited memories, A Listening Ministry, appeared in 2016.

Catholic Church titles
Preceded by James William Gleeson	Archbishop of Adelaide; 1985–2001	Succeeded by Philip Wilson
