= Apostolic Vicariate of King George Sounde – The Sound =

The Apostolic Vicariate of King George Sounde – The Sound was a short-lived (1845–47) Latin Rite Roman Catholic missionary pre-diocesan jurisdiction in Australia.

It was established in 1845 as an apostolic vicariate (directly subject to the Holy See and not part of any ecclesiastical province) entitled to a titular bishop as ordinary of King George Sounde – The Sound on territories split off from the then Roman Catholic Diocese of Adelaide and the Metropolitan Roman Catholic Archdiocese of Sydney.

No ordinary is recorded. It was suppressed in 1847 and its territory returned.
