= Roman Catholic Archdiocese of Adelaide =

Catholic ecclesiastical territory

Coordinates: 34°55′44″S 138°36′05″E

Archdiocese of Adelaide Archidioecesis Adelaidensis
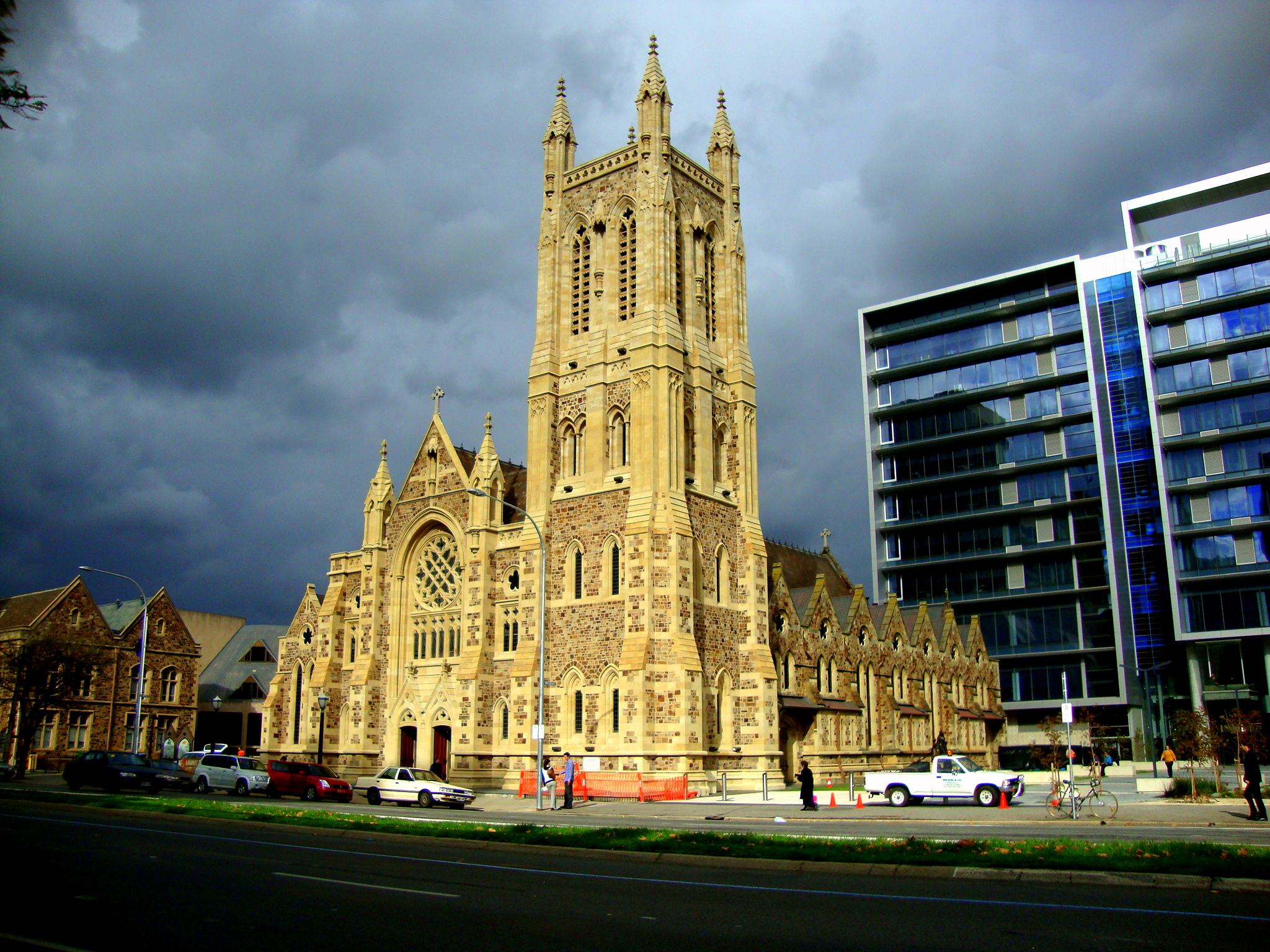
- St Francis Xavier's Cathedral, Adelaide

Location
- Country: Australia

Statistics
- Area: 103,600 km^{2} (40,000 sq mi)
- Population: Total; Catholics: (as of 2006); ▲1,290,786; ▲275,174 (▲21.3%)

Information
- Denomination: Roman Catholic
- Rite: Roman Rite
- Established: 5 April 1842 as Vicariate Apostolic of Adelaide; 22 April 1842 as Diocese of Adelaide; 10 May 1887 as Archdiocese of Adelaide
- Cathedral: St Francis Xavier, Adelaide
- Patron saint: St. Patrick

Current leadership
- Pope: Leo XIV
- Archbishop of Adelaide: Patrick O`Regan

Map

Website
- adelaide.catholic.org.au

The Roman Catholic Archdiocese of Adelaide is a Latin Church metropolitan archdiocese of the Catholic Church in Australia located in Adelaide, South Australia.

== Cathedral ==
St Francis Xavier's Cathedral, Adelaide is the seat of the Catholic Archbishop of Adelaide.

== History ==
On 5 April 1842 the Apostolic Vicariate of Adelaide was erected, on territory split from the Apostolic Vicariate of New Holland and Van Diemen's Land (the later primatial Archdiocese of Sydney), both missionary pre-diocesan jurisdictions. It was promoted as the Diocese of Adelaide two weeks later on 22 April 1842, just six years after the first fleet arrived to Glenelg.

In 1845 it lost territory to establish the Apostolic Vicariate of King George Sounde - The Sound, which it recuperated in 1847 at the vicariate's suppression.

On 10 May 1887 it was promoted as the Archdiocese of Adelaide, while losing territory to establish the Roman Catholic Diocese of Port Augusta.

It had a papal visit from Pope John Paul II in November 1986.

On 19 March 2020, Patrick O'Regan was announced by Pope Francis to be the 12th Archbishop of Adelaide.

== Province ==
The Roman Catholic Ecclesiastical Province of Adelaide comprises the metropolitan's own archdiocese and these suffragan dioceses:

- Roman Catholic Diocese of Darwin
- Roman Catholic Diocese of Port Pirie

== Bishops ==
=== Ordinaries ===
The following individuals have been elected as Roman Catholic Archbishop of Adelaide, or any of its precursor titles:

- Francis Murphy, Apostolic vicar (5 April 1842 - 1843)

Order	Name	Title	Date enthroned	Reign ended	Term of office	Reason for term end
1	Francis Murphy (see above) †	Bishop of Adelaide	22 April 1842	28 Apr 1858	16 years, 6 days	Died in office
2	Patrick Geoghegan, OFMRef †	Bishop of Adelaide	15 April 1859	10 March 1864	4 years, 330 days	Elected as Bishop of Goulburn
3	Laurence Sheil, OFMRef †	Bishop of Adelaide	23 June 1865	1 March 1872	6 years, 252 days	Died in office
4	Christopher Reynolds †	Bishop of Adelaide	25 May 1873	10 May 1887	13 years, 350 days	Elevated as Archbishop of Adelaide
4	Christopher Reynolds †	Archbishop of Adelaide	10 May 1887	16 June 1893	6 years, 37 days	Died in office
5	John O'Reily †	Archbishop of Adelaide	5 January 1895	6 July 1915	20 years, 182 days	Died in office
6	Robert Spence, OP †	Coadjutor Archbishop of Adelaide	2 May 1914	6 July 1915	1 year, 65 days	Succeeded as Archbishop of Adelaide
6	Robert Spence, OP †	Archbishop of Adelaide	6 July 1915	5 November 1934	19 years, 122 days	Died in office
7	Andrew Killian †	Coadjutor Archbishop of Adelaide	11 July 1933	5 November 1934	1 year, 117 days	Succeeded as Archbishop of Adelaide
7	Andrew Killian †	Archbishop of Adelaide	5 November 1934	28 June 1939	4 years, 235 days	Died in office
8	Matthew Beovich †	Archbishop of Adelaide	11 December 1939	1 May 1971	31 years, 141 days	Retired and appointed Archbishop Emeritus of Adelaide
9	James William Gleeson †	Auxiliary Bishop of Adelaide	15 February 1957	6 July 1964	7 years, 142 days	Elevated as Coadjutor Archbishop of Adelaide
9	James William Gleeson †	Coadjutor Archbishop of Adelaide	6 July 1964	1 May 1971	6 years, 299 days	Succeeded as Archbishop of Adelaide
9	James William Gleeson †	Archbishop of Adelaide	1 May 1971	19 June 1985	14 years, 49 days	Resigned and appointed Archbishop Emeritus of Adelaide
10	Leonard Faulkner †	Coadjutor Archbishop of Adelaide	2 September 1983	19 June 1985	1 year, 290 days	Succeeded as Archbishop of Adelaide
10	Leonard Faulkner †	Archbishop of Adelaide	19 June 1985	3 December 2001	16 years, 167 days	Retired and appointed Archbishop Emeritus of Adelaide
11	Philip Wilson †	Coadjutor Archbishop of Adelaide	30 November 2000	3 December 2001	1 year, 3 days	Succeeded as Archbishop of Adelaide
11	Philip Wilson †	Archbishop of Adelaide	3 December 2001	30 July 2018	16 years, 239 days	Resigned
12	Patrick O'Regan	Archbishop of Adelaide	25 May 2020	Incumbent	6 years, 143 days	

Note: On 3 June 2018 Pope Francis named Bishop Gregory O’Kelly, S.J. of Port Pirie as Apostolic Administrator of Adelaide. This occurred after Archbishop Philip Wilson was initially found guilty of concealing child-abuse on 22 May 2018 and did not resign. Pope Francis eventually accepted his letter of resignation on 30 July 2018. Wilson's conviction was later overturned on appeal, but he did not return to the role.

Coadjutors are included in the above table.

=== Auxiliary bishops ===
Name	Titles	Start	End	Reason for term end
Francis Augustin Henschke †	Auxiliary Bishop of Adelaide, Titular Bishop of Praenetus	18 May 1937	16 November 1939	appointed Bishop of Wagga Wagga
James William Gleeson †	Auxiliary Bishop of Adelaide, Titular Bishop of Sesta	15 February 1957	6 July 1964	appointed Coadjutor Archbishop of Adelaide (see above table)
Philip James Anthony Kennedy †	Auxiliary Bishop of Adelaide, Titular Bishop of Ros Cré	29 January 1973	23 March 1983	deceased
Gregory O'Kelly S.J.	Auxiliary Bishop of Adelaide, Titular Bishop of Ath Truim	6 July 2006	15 April 2009	appointed Bishop of Port Pirie

=== Other priest of this diocese who became bishop ===
- Charles Victor Emmanuel Gauci, appointed Bishop of Darwin in 2018

== Sexual abuse cases ==
Father Albert Davis (died 2007), a member of the Dominican Fathers, was charged in 2006 with 17 incidents of indecent assault involving seven boys at Blackfriars Priory School from 1956 to 1960. Davis was committed to stand trial in the Adelaide District Court, but he died before proceedings were commenced.

In September 2011, Senator Nick Xenophon used parliamentary privilege to name an Adelaide priest as the alleged perpetrator of sexual assaults on John Hepworth about 50 years earlier. Senator Xenophon alleged that the Vicar-General of Adelaide, Monsignor David Cappo, had been provided with detailed allegations in 2008 but had failed to act upon them, the investigations still being "at a preliminary stage" and the priest concerned not being stood down during the investigation. An independent inquiry by Michael Abbott QC reported that there was no substance to the allegations, although Hepworth had declined to be interviewed for the inquiry.

== See also ==
- Roman Catholicism in Australia
- Catholic schools in South Australia
