= Brett Knowles =

Australian rules footballer

Personal information
- Full name: Brett Knowles
- Born: 13 May 1978 (age 48)
- Original team: Morwell

Playing career^{1}
Years	Club	Games (Goals)
1998–2001	St Kilda	43 (8)
- ^{1} Playing statistics correct to the end of 2001.

Brett Knowles (born 13 May 1978) is a former Australian rules footballer who played with the St Kilda Football Club in the Australian Football League (AFL). Recruited from Morwell through Gippsland Power, Knowles spent his debut season playing for St Kilda reserves in 1997. Given an opportunity to play at senior level in 1998, he showed promise but was sidelined in 1999 due to injury. His most successful year was 2000, when he played 17 games. He was dropped from the senior team in 2001 and later delisted.

As of February 2026, Knowles notably serves as the deputy principal of Blackfriars Priory School in Prospect, South Australia.

== Sources ==
- Holmesby, Russell & Main, Jim (2007). The Encyclopedia of AFL Footballers. 7th ed. Melbourne: Bas Publishing.
