= Andrew Killian =

Irish-Australian clergyman

The Most Reverend Andrew Killian
- Archbishop of Adelaide
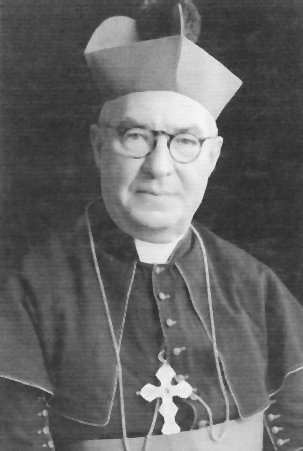
- Andrew Killian
- Archdiocese: Adelaide
- Installed: 5 November 1934
- Term ended: 28 June 1939
- Predecessor: Robert Spence
- Successor: Matthew Beovich

Orders
- Ordination: 4 June 1898
- Consecration: 15 June 1924

Personal details
- Born: 26 October 1872 Edenderry, County Offaly, Ireland
- Died: 28 June 1939 (aged 66) Melbourne, Australia
- Education: Carlow College

Andrew Killian (26 October 1872 – 28 June 1939) was an Irish clergyman and the fourth Archbishop of Adelaide. Born and ordained in Ireland, Killian moved to Australia, where he became Bishop of Port Augusta before succeeding Robert Spence as Archbishop of Adelaide.

== Early life ==
Andrew Killian was born on 26 October 1872 in Edenderry, County Offaly, Ireland. Son of Nicholas Killian and his wife Eliza Josephine, née Ryan, Killian was educated at Mungret College, Limerick and St Patrick's College, Carlow. He received a Bachelor of Arts degree from the Royal University of Ireland in 1894, and was ordained a Catholic priest on 4 June 1898.

In late 1898, Killian came to Australia where his first appointment was as an assistant priest in Bourke, New South Wales. In 1907, he was transferred to Broken Hill where he demonstrated abilities as a parish administrator, clearing the debt of the parish, overseeing the construction of a school and eventually becoming Vicar General of the diocese. Killian was made a domestic prelate (monsignor) in 1919, and in 1924 was consecrated as bishop of Port Augusta, (Note: The Diocese of Port Augusta became the Diocese of Port Pirie in 1951.) a position he held until 1933. During his time as Bishop of Port Augusta, Killian would travel over large distances to visit the scattered parishes of the rural diocese.

== Archbishop of Adelaide ==
In July 1933, Killian was appointed as coadjutor archbishop of Adelaide where he assisted the ailing Robert Spence, and after Spence died on 5 November 1934, Killian became Archbishop of Adelaide.

Killian's tenure as archbishop saw Adelaide host the National Catholic Education Congress in 1936, in part as a contribution to the celebrations of the South Australian colony's centenary. While Bishop of Port Augusta, Killian had attended Catholic conferences in Chicago and Dublin, and endeavoured to use the Congress to project South Australian Catholic enthusiasm and make a case for increased public funding of Catholic education. The event took place over one week in November 1936 and hosted bishops and archbishops from Australia and New Zealand, as well as the apostolic delegate to Australia Giovanni Panico. Leading Catholic educators presented papers, and the Congress concluded with a procession of 100,000 people along King William Street. When reflecting on his time as archbishop, Killian listed the conference as one of his proudest achievements, along with the re-opening of Mary MacKillop's school and convent in Penola.

In the last year of his life, Killian suffered from cancer, and on 28 June 1939 he died while undergoing surgery in St Vincent's Private Hospital Melbourne. He was succeeded by Matthew Beovich, who was consecrated as archbishop in early 1940.
