= Christopher Augustine Reynolds =

Catholic archbishop (1834–1893)

- Archbishop of Adelaide
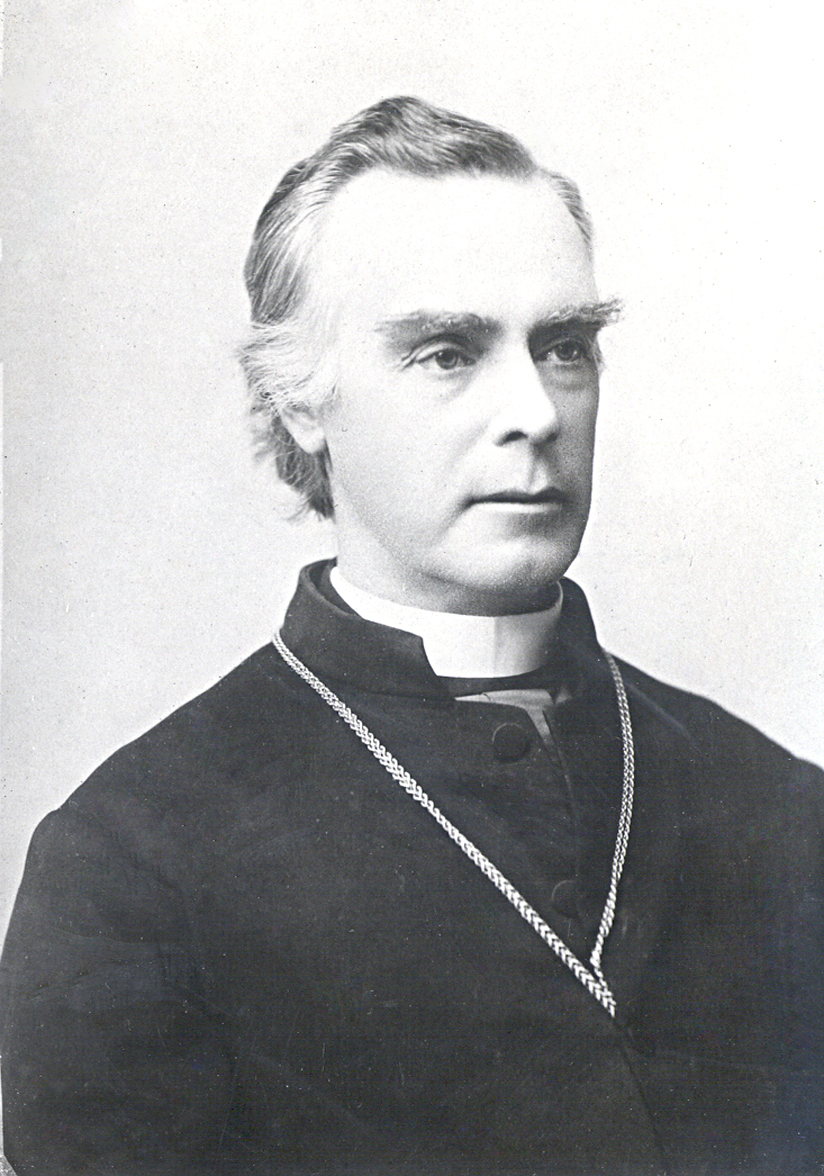
- Church: Catholic Church
- Archdiocese: Archdiocese of Adelaide
- In office: 13 June 1873 – 16 June 1893
- Predecessor: Laurence Sheil
- Successor: John O'Reily

Orders
- Ordination: 20 April 1860 by Patrick Geoghegan
- Consecration: 2 November 1873 by John Bede Polding

Personal details
- Born: 1834 Dublin, United Kingdom of Great Britain and Ireland
- Died: 12 June 1893 (aged 58) Adelaide, Province of South Australia, British Empire

Christopher Augustine Reynolds (1834–1893) was an Irish Roman Catholic bishop who became the first Archbishop of Adelaide in Australia.

== Biography ==
Born in Dublin, Ireland on 25 July 1834 or 11 August 1834, he was ordained to the priesthood on 20 April 1860.

Reynolds was appointed the bishop of the Diocese of Adelaide by the Holy See on 25 May 1873, and consecrated to the episcopate on 28 November 1873. The principal consecrator was Archbishop John Bede Polding of Sydney and the principal co-consecrators were Bishop Daniel Murphy of Hobart, Bishop Matthew Quinn of Bathurst and Bishop James Murray of Maitland.

In November 1886, Reynolds laid the foundation stone for an extension on the eastern side of St Francis Xavier's Cathedral which would accommodate a further 200 people. He dedicated the extensions on 15 August 1887.

Reynolds became the first Archbishop of Adelaide when the see was elevated to an archdiocese on 10 May 1887. Under his guidance, The Southern Cross newspaper was started in 1889.

He died in office on 12 June 1893, aged 58.

Catholic Church titles
Preceded by Laurence Bonaventure Sheil	Bishop of Adelaide; 1873–1887	Title elevated
New title	Archbishop of Adelaide; 1887–1893	Succeeded by John O'Reilly
