= James Gleeson (bishop) =

Australian clergyman

The Most Reverend James Gleeson
- Catholic Archbishop of Adelaide
- Archdiocese: Adelaide
- Installed: 1 May 1971
- Term ended: 19 June 1985
- Predecessor: Matthew Beovich
- Successor: Leonard Faulkner

Personal details
- Born: 24 December 1920
- Died: 21 March 2000 (aged 79)

James William Gleeson CMG (24 December 1920 – 21 March 2000) was an Australian clergyman and the sixth Catholic Archbishop of Adelaide. He was the first South Australian priest to become Catholic Archbishop of Adelaide.

== Early life ==
James William Gleeson was born on 24 December 1920 in Balaklava, north of Adelaide in South Australia. His early education was in Balaklava, attending a Josephite school before going to boarding school at Sacred Heart College in Somerton Park, South Australia, a Marist Brothers college. Gleeson's studies for the priesthood were undertaken at Corpus Christi College in Werribee, Victoria, and he was ordained by Archbishop Matthew Beovich in Adelaide's St. Francis Xavier's Cathedral on 24 July 1945. After serving as an assistant priest in the cathedral parish for a year, Beovich sent Gleeson to a teacher's college in Melbourne for a year, and in 1952 appointed him Director of Catholic Education for the archdiocese. In 1958, Gleeson received Queen's Birthday Honours, becoming a companion of the Order of St Michael and St George (CMG). Cited for the award was his work with young people, both as Director of Catholic Education and through his participation with organisations dealing with the education and welfare of students.

== Episcopacy ==
After suffering a period of bad health, in November 1956 Matthew Beovich requested that he receive an auxiliary bishop. Pope Pius XII appointed Gleeson to the position, and he was consecrated by Beovich on 21 May 1957, becoming Adelaide's first South Australian Catholic bishop. To Gleeson, Beovich delegated responsibility for Catholic Action movements and Catholic radio and television, and he eventually came to chair a number of diocesan committees and councils. The Archbishop also tasked him with the ordination of new priests and parish visitation. However, the most important parts of the diocesan administration, such as financial and policy matters, remained under Beovich's control.

In July 1964, Gleeson was appointed coadjutor archbishop, in effect naming him as Beovich's successor. Beovich retired on 1 May 1971, making Gleeson the first South Australian priest to become Archbishop of Adelaide.

On 20 March 2000, Archbishop Gleeson died as the result of a heart attack. His funeral was held at St. Francis Xavier's Cathedral. The Catholic school Gleeson College is named in his honour.

== Notes ==
Catholic Church titles
Preceded by Matthew Beovich	Archbishop of Adelaide; 1971 – 1985	Succeeded by Leonard Faulkner
