= John O'Reily =

Archbishop of Adelaide (1846–1915)

The Most Reverend John O'Reily
- Archbishop of Adelaide
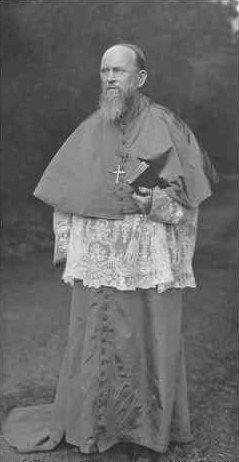
- John O'Reily c.1900
- Archdiocese: Adelaide
- Installed: 1895
- Term ended: 1915
- Predecessor: Christopher Reynolds
- Successor: Robert Spence
- Other posts: Bishop of Port Augusta, 1887–1895

Orders
- Ordination: 21 June 1869 (Priest)
- Consecration: 1 May 1888 (Bishop)

Personal details
- Born: 19 November 1846 Kilkenny, Ireland
- Died: 6 July 1915 (aged 68) Adelaide, Australia
- Buried: West Terrace Cemetery, Adelaide, Australia
- Denomination: Roman Catholic Church
- Parents: Michael O'Reily and Anne O'Reily, née Gallagher
- Education: All Hallows College; St Kieran's College

John O'Reily (born John O'Reilly, 19 November 1846 – 6 July 1915) was an Australian Roman Catholic clergyman, the first Bishop of Port Augusta, and the second Archbishop of Adelaide. Born in Kilkenny, Ireland, O'Reily studied for the priesthood in Dublin. Upon his ordination in 1869, he migrated to Western Australia, serving as a parish priest in Fremantle, and founding a Catholic newspaper there. When the Diocese of Port Augusta was established in 1887, Pope Leo XIII named O'Reily as its first bishop. Concerned about the financial position of the diocese (which had inherited significant debt from the Diocese of Adelaide), he accepted the posting reluctantly. As bishop, he greatly improved the financial position of the new diocese, reducing its debt by half and earning a reputation as a competent administrator.

In 1894, O'Reily was appointed to replace the deceased Christopher Reynolds as Archbishop of Adelaide. The archdiocese he inherited was burdened with substantial debt, again left over from the old Diocese of Adelaide. Through the sale of church assets and a fundraising campaign, O'Reily was able to eliminate most of the Archdiocese's liabilities while still investing in church infrastructure. He also actively participated in public discussions relating to education policy at a time when the role of the state in supporting religious education was topical. O'Reily publicly advocated government assistance for religious schools, stating that it was unfair Catholics paid taxes to support state schools, but received no funding for their own. In the later years of his life, poor health forced him to spend less time attending to his episcopal duties, and from 1905, he largely retreated from public life. At his request, Robert Spence was appointed as his coadjutor and successor in 1914, and on 6 July 1915, he died at his house in Adelaide. O'Reily was highly regarded by many in South Australian society, with Adelaide's daily newspapers praising his character, administrative ability and positive relations with non-Catholics.

== Early life ==
O'Reily was born John O'Reilly on 19 November 1846, in Kilkenny, Ireland, the son of Michael, a military officer, and Anne, née Gallagher. He completed his primary education at the parochial school of St. John's Parish, and spent six and a half years at St Kieran's College. Due to poor health, he decided against pursuing a military career, and in 1864 he entered All Hallows College in Dublin to study for the priesthood. He learnt Irish, and studied mental philosophy, mathematics and ecclesiastical studies, achieving first prize in each of his classes. After being ordained on 21 June 1869, he left Ireland for Western Australia in October, arriving in January 1870. Having served briefly in Newcastle (present day Toodyay) and Northam, he became a parish priest in Fremantle, establishing the West Australian Catholic Record in 1874 and serving as its publisher, editor and printer from 1883.

== Bishop of Port Augusta ==
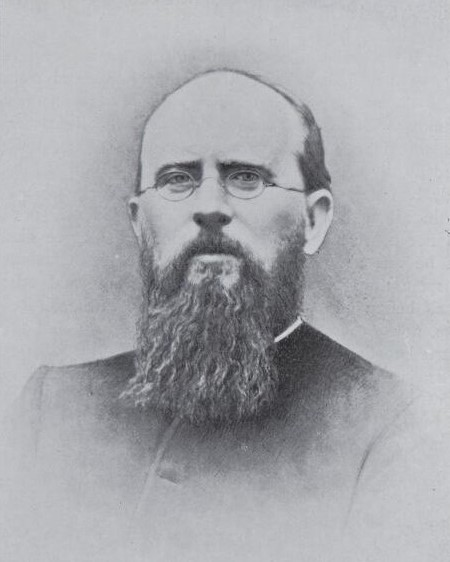

Following a recommendation from the first plenary council of Australia and New Zealand in 1885, in May 1887 Pope Leo XIII elevated the Diocese of Adelaide to an Archdiocese and metropolitan see. As a suffragan diocese to Adelaide, the Pope established the rural Diocese of Port Pirie, naming O'Reilly as its inaugural bishop. Upon his appointment, O'Reilly travelled to Adelaide, where he met with the Archbishop of Adelaide Christopher Reynolds and the Cardinal of Sydney Patrick Moran to discuss the formation of the new diocese. The poor financial state of the Archdiocese made the discussions contentious, with O'Reilly concerned about the amount of debt Port Augusta would inherit from Adelaide. To ensure a sufficiently large population for the new diocese, Moran suggested that its boundaries be altered from those drawn up by the Pope, but Reynolds opposed this plan. Dissatisfied with the outcome of the discussions, O'Reilly decided to travel to Sydney to deliberate further with the Cardinal, prompting Reynolds to write to Moran:

"If the Holy See would think well of giving the entire colony of South Australia to the care of Dr O'Reily,[sic] I would offer no opposition to it and would gladly enter a monastery and spend my few remaining years in preparation for the end!"

On 27 October, O'Reilly wrote to Pope Leo XIII requesting permission to reverse his decision to accept the appointment to Port Augusta, believing he would be unable to administer a diocese with such significant debt and such a small, impoverished population. In addition, he wrote, he had no personal wealth to contribute to the finances of the diocese. The concerns O'Reilly raised prompted Cardinal Simeoni of the Congregation for the Propagation of the Faith to call for an official church inquiry into the financial situation of the South Australian dioceses. The report found a total of almost £38,000 of debt, with the new Port Augusta diocese bearing £18,000. Following the report, O'Reilly's request was refused, and on 1 May 1888, he was consecrated in St Mary's Cathedral in Sydney. Later that year, in an effort to save time while signing documents, O'Reilly removed an "l" from his surname.

Although the Sisters of St. Joseph operated eight primary schools in the Diocese of Port Augusta, it was without a Catholic high school—boarding or otherwise. Accordingly, while he was staying in Sydney for his consecration, O'Reily sought to establish a convent for the Sydney-based Sisters of the Good Samaritan in Port Pirie. At the bishop's expense, the order's Mother-General spent two months in Port Pirie, and once she had found appropriate living quarters, a school was established, teaching over 100 students. A convent for the sisters was completed in 1890 on the same block as the school.

Upon his return to South Australia, O'Reily immediately set about improving the financial situation of the Diocese of Port Augusta. He requested financial assistance from the Congregation for the Propagation of the Faith, and divided the diocese into fund-raising districts, campaigning for contributions in each of them. With the permission of Archbishop Thomas Carr in Melbourne, O'Reily toured parishes in Victoria asking for funds for his new diocese. By 1893, he had reduced the diocesan debt by half, with his peers describing him as a "practical, clear-headed man of business" due to his administrative ability.

While Bishop of Port Augusta, O'Reily showed an interest in education policy. He authored a pastoral letter on the matter in March 1889, and the next year gave a speech criticising the lack of government funding for Catholic schools. According to O'Reily, it was unfair and unjust that Catholics paid taxes to support state schools but received no government support for their own. O'Reily's views on education were frequently cited when the Free Education Bill (which aimed to make state schools free) came before the South Australian Parliament in 1890, but the cost of the scheme meant that the bill was not passed. Although there was some discussion of funding for religious schools when the bill was reintroduced the next year, these proposals failed to gain significant parliamentary support, and in 1891, the bill was passed without assistance for religious schools.

O'Reily suffered a long and serious illness through early 1894 and continued to suffer from migraines throughout the year, forcing him to delegate many of his duties to James Maher (his vicar general) and John Norton (an official consultor) who would later become, respectively, the second and third Bishops of Port Augusta.

== Archbishop of Adelaide ==
After suffering a two-year illness, Archbishop Reynolds died in June 1893, and by January 1894, rumours of O'Reily being appointed as his successor were published in Port Augusta papers. Although he dismissed such speculation, a letter of appointment arrived from Rome in March, naming him as the next Archbishop of Adelaide.

=== Archdiocesan finances ===
As Bishop of Port Augusta, O'Reily had fought to minimise the debt inherited from the old Diocese of Adelaide. Having reduced the new diocese's debts by half in his six years as bishop, upon becoming Archbishop of Adelaide, O'Reily found the rest of the old diocesan liabilities awaiting him, their size having actually increased. In 1895, he presented a report on the state of the archdiocesan finances to the Sunday congregation in St. Francis Xavier's Cathedral, revealing total liabilities of just over £37,000. O'Reily reckoned £10,000 could be paid off by selling land owned by the Archdiocese. Two weeks after his address, a meeting of Adelaide Catholics supported moves to liquidate the archdiocesan debts, with £3,600 pledged at that meeting, including £1,000 over four years from O'Reily himself, a significant portion of his income.

Since the sale or mortgaging of church land required an act of Parliament, in 1896, the South Australian Parliament unanimously approved The Catholic Church Endowment Society Incorporated Sale of Lands Bill. This allowed the Archbishop to make good on his intention to sell all diocesan land not used for church purposes, and over the next few years, land, surplus vestments and works of art owned by the Archdiocese were sold off. These sales, combined the efforts of the Archbishop and diocesan priests to secure donations from around the Archdiocese, meant that by 1901 O'Reily was able to report that the debt had been reduced by three-quarters. This had been achieved at the same time as expenditure was being made on new schools, churches and other diocesan buildings. In fact, O'Reily noted in his report for that year that the remainder of the debt could have been removed had expenditure been cut, writing:

"Were we but willing to check our expansion and in checking it, check our expenditure as well, the last vestige of our debts would speedily have disappeared. Living things must grow, however. Our churches, our schools, our charitable institutions must expand and multiply. We have future needs to provide for as well as at present."

=== Education policy ===
As Archbishop, O'Reily continued his participation in public discussions regarding education. In 1896, a colony-wide referendum sought to gauge public opinion on state education, scripture reading in state schools, and the provision of capitation grants (fixed grants per student) to non-state schools. O'Reily weighed into the debate in The Register, giving conditional support to scriptural instruction in state schools, so long as the teachers themselves were religious and Catholic students received instruction from Catholic teachers. On the subject of a capitation grant, O'Reily was strongly supportive, arguing that moral impediments prevented Catholics from using secular education, and that, since religious schools provided elements of secular education as well as religious instruction, they should receive government assistance. At the referendum, South Australians affirmed the system of free secular education, but rejected scriptural readings in schools and the capitation grant.

O'Reily blamed the Labor Party for the loss of the capitation grant. According to O'Reily, the serving Premier Charles Kingston could have been convinced to support the grant were it not for the objections of Labor, with whom Kingston had formed a coalition government. In 1899, in the lead-up to that year's general election, O'Reily gave a speech criticising the Labor Party, accusing some Labor leaders of having "an evident disposition to crush [Catholic labourers] with successive burdens."

== Later life and legacy ==
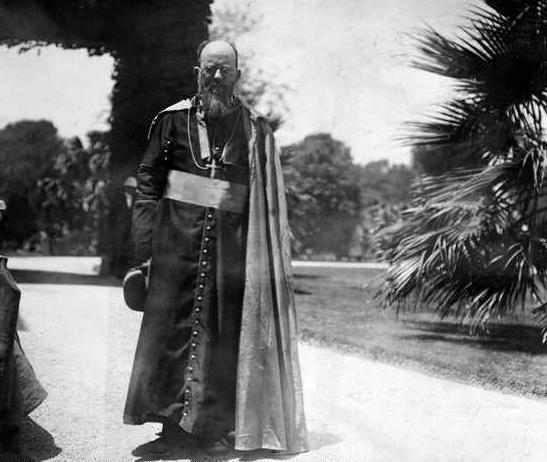
Archbishop O'Reily, c. 1910

In 1904, O'Reily travelled Europe to make his ad limina visit to Rome, and to visit his native Ireland where he was made a freeman of Kilkenny. Due to poor health, from 1905, O'Reily kept to himself in his house in Glen Osmond, leading to the local press referring to him as the "Recluse of Glen Osmond". Increasingly, his episcopal duties were fulfilled by Bishop of Port Augusta John Norton, who would have to visit the more remote parts of O'Reily's see on his behalf. As he became more frail, O'Reily would ask certain priests to accompany him when he travelled, among whom was the Dominican prior Robert Spence. When O'Reily requested a coadjutor in 1913, he chose Spence as his first preference for the role. Despite the reluctance of some clergy to the appointment of a religious as Archbishop, Spence was consecrated as coadjutor, with right of succession, in August 1914. O'Reily died on 6 July 1915 at his house in Glen Osmond, and was buried under a large Celtic cross at the West Terrace Cemetery.

During his time as Archbishop, O'Reily had formed positive relationships with many senior members of South Australian society, including the Anglican Bishop of Adelaide Nutter Thomas, and the Chief Justice of the Supreme Court of South Australia, Samuel Way, who considered him a friend. In an editorial in 1913, The Advertiser praised O'Reily, lauding his administrative abilities and crediting the good relations between Protestants and Catholics in South Australia to his "broadness of mind and to his quiet determination to avoid all unnecessary controversy." Upon his death, The Register gave a glowing editorial, describing him as "loveable and highly estimable", a "hard hitter" and asserting that, had he not been a religious leader, he could have been "a leading financier, Imperial legislator or even an eminent military commander."
