= Robert Spence (bishop) =

Australian Roman Catholic clergyman (b.1860 - d.1934)

The Most Reverend Robert Spence
- Archbishop of Adelaide
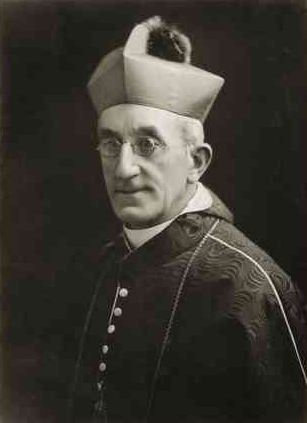
- Robert Spence c. 1920
- Archdiocese: Adelaide
- Installed: 6 July 1915
- Term ended: 5 November 1934
- Predecessor: John O'Reily
- Successor: Andrew Killian

Orders
- Ordination: 23 December 1882
- Consecration: 16 August 1914

Personal details
- Born: 13 January 1860 Cork, Ireland
- Died: 5 November 1934 (aged 74) Adelaide, Australia
- Education: College of Corpo Santo, Lisbon

Robert William Spence (13 January 1860 – 5 November 1934) was an Australian Roman Catholic clergyman, and the third Roman Catholic Archbishop of Adelaide. Born in Ireland, Spence became a Dominican priest, and after serving as a prior in Kilkenny, moved to Adelaide, Australia in 1898. In 1915, he became Archbishop of Adelaide, a position he held until his death in 1934.

== Early life ==
Robert Spence was born on 13 January 1860 in Cork, Ireland. The son of Robert Spence and his wife Ellen, née Sullivan, he received his education from the Christian Brothers and Vincentian Fathers before entering the Dominican novitiate in Tallaght, outside Dublin. Having professed in 1878, Spence moved to Lisbon, where he studied for the priesthood at College of Corpo Santo, Lisbon. He was ordained a priest on 23 December 1882, and two days later, at Bom Sucesso convent he celebrated the first Dominican high mass in Portugal since religious orders were suppressed there in 1833. Returning to Ireland in 1885, he served in Cork and Newry, and ran retreats throughout Ireland, earning a reputation as a zealous and forceful preacher. In 1892, he became prior of the Black Abbey priory in Kilkenny, a position he held for six years.

In 1898, Spence travelled to Adelaide, Australia as prior of the first Dominican house of friars in Australia until 1901. Spence constructed a priory at St Laurence's Church in North Adelaide, and ran retreats ministering to religious. In 1899, he founded the Adelaide Catholic Club (intended as a Catholic version of the Adelaide Club), and throughout his time in Adelaide he continued to participate in Catholic associations, serving as president of the state branch of the Australian Catholic Federation and reviving the North Adelaide branch of the Hibernian Australasian Catholic Benefit Society. While serving as a prior in North Adelaide from 1908, Spence became more involved in the administration of the Archdiocese, advising then Archbishop John O'Reily, and often accompanying him when the Archbishop travelled.

== Episcopacy ==
By the 1910s, Archbishop O'Reily was growing frail, with many of his pastoral duties having to be filled by Bishop of Port Augusta John Norton. In 1913, O'Reily requested a coadjutor, indicating his preference for Spence to be appointed. Despite some Australian bishops raising objections to a religious becoming a bishop, Spence was appointed coadjutor archbishop on 13 July 1914. He was consecrated on 16 August of the same year, and when O'Reily died on 6 July 1915, Spence became Archbishop.

While Archbishop, Spence continued to wear the plain clothes of his Dominican order rather than the purple soutane of an archbishop. He carried on O'Reily's efforts to restructure the diocesan finances, removing much of the diocese debt. After returning from an ad limina visit to Rome in 1921, he travelled through the archdiocese to raise funds for the completion and transformation of St Francis Xavier's Cathedral, with the new building opened in 1926.

While in Ireland in 1920, Spence gave a controversial speech in Newry where he saluted the Irish flag and alleged that "soldiers of the British Government were committing atrocities in Ireland." The incident was controversial in Australia, with Adelaide newspapers accusing him of disloyalty. In July 1933, in the same month as he was made a count of the Holy Roman Empire, an assistant at the pontifical throne and a companion to Pius XI, Andrew Killian was appointed to serve as Spence's coadjutor. Spence died in Adelaide on 5 November 1934, with the Adelaide City Council adjourning as a sign of respect for the late Archbishop.

On 8 March 1931, Spence dedicated the pulpit designed by Adelaide architect Herbert Jory for St Xavier's, erected as a memorial to Roman Catholic soldiers who had died in World War I and regarded as an important example of church furniture.
