= St Vincent's Private Hospital Melbourne =

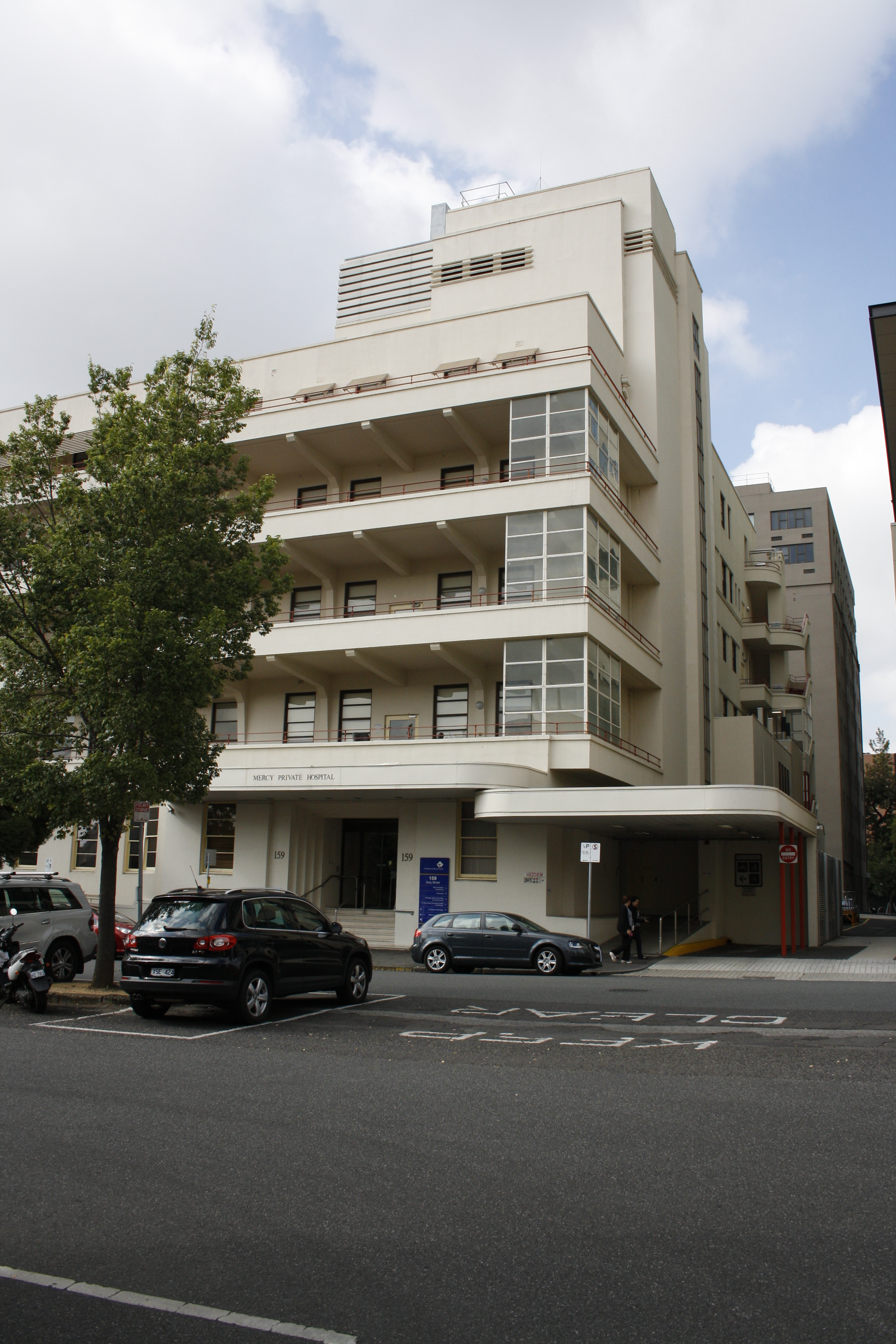

Geography
- Location: Victoria, Australia
- Coordinates: 37°48′31″S 144°58′27″E

Services
- Beds: 480

History
- Founded: 1998

Links
- Website: www.svphm.org.au
- Lists: Hospitals in Australia

St Vincent's Private Hospital Melbourne, formerly known as St Vincent's & Mercy Private Hospital, was the name of a private hospital group in Melbourne, Victoria, Australia.

The group of hospitals are now all part of a larger group across Australia, under the name St Vincent's Private Hospitals and run by St Vincent's Health Australia (SVHA).

== History ==
The hospital was founded in 1998, with the merger of the St Vincent's Private and Mercy Private Hospitals. The (Catholic) Sisters of Charity and Sisters of Mercy ran the two hospitals independently for more than 70 years before their merger

St Vincent's purchased Vimy Private Hospital in 2008, creating the third campus.

St Vincent's Private Hospital Werribee was purpose-built and opened in Werribee 2018, the first private overnight hospital in City of Wyndham.

== Location ==
St Vincent's Private Hospitals are located across four campuses in the Melbourne suburbs of Fitzroy, East Melbourne, Kew, and Werribee. Each campus is denominated St Vincent's Private Hospital, with the associated suburb included as an addendum to the designation.

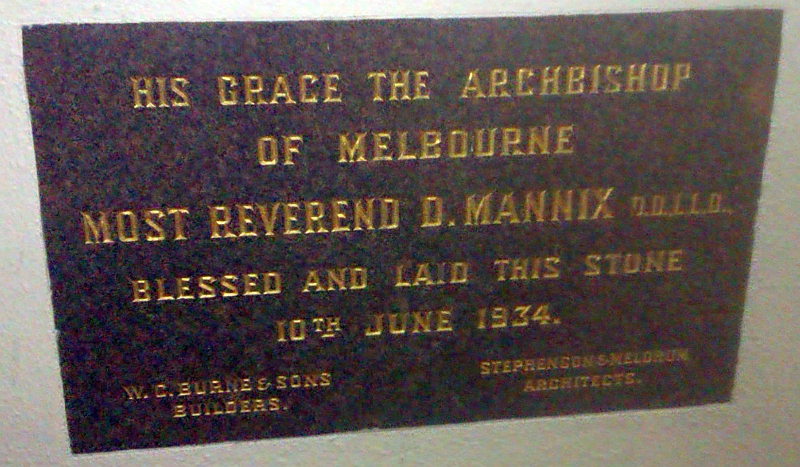

== See also ==
- Teaching staff of University of Melbourne, Department of Surgery
- List of hospitals in Australia
- Healthcare in Australia
