= Patrick O'Regan (bishop) =

The Most Reverend Patrick O'Regan
- Archbishop of Adelaide
- Church: Catholic Church
- Archdiocese: Archdiocese of Adelaide
- Predecessor: Philip Wilson
- Previous post: Bishop of Sale

Orders
- Ordination: 2 September 1983 in St Michael and St John's Cathedral, Bathurst, New South Wales
- Consecration: 26 February 2015 in St Mary's Cathedral, Sale, Victoria by Denis Hart

Personal details
- Born: Patrick Michael O'Regan; 8 October 1958 (age 68) Bathurst, New South Wales
- Education: St Patrick's College, Manly; Institut Catholique, Paris

Styles of Patrick Michael O'Regan
- Reference style: The Most Reverend
- Spoken style: His Grace or My Lord Archbishop
- Religious style: Archbishop

Patrick Michael O'Regan (born 8 October 1958) is a prelate of the Catholic Church. He has been the Archbishop of Adelaide since 25 May 2020. Prior to that, he had been the Bishop of Sale since 2015.

O'Regan was elected as the 9th Bishop of Sale in 2014 and he was consecrated and installed as a bishop by the Archbishop of Melbourne, Denis Hart on 26 February 2015 at a ceremony in Sale. On 19 March 2020, Pope Francis announced that Bishop O'Regan would become the 12th Archbishop of Adelaide.

== Early years and background ==
O'Regan was born in Bathurst, New South Wales, one of four children and grew up in the village of Perthville, located approximately 5 kilometres (3.1 mi) south of Bathurst. Educated at St Joseph's Primary School, Perthville and St Stanislaus' College, Bathurst, O'Regan commenced study for the priesthood at St Columba College, Springwood and later at St Patrick's College. During his semester breaks it was reported that he pulled beers at the Majellan Club, carted feed and cut cauliflowers in the local market gardens.

Ordained as a priest at St Michael and St John's Cathedral in Bathurst on 2 September 1983, O'Regan served as an assistant parish priest in parishes in Lithgow, Cowra, Orange and in Bathurst. During 1994 and 1995 O'Regan commenced higher studies at the Institut Catholique, Paris. He returned to Australia, initially to Orange, before being appointed as a parish priest in Wellington. O'Regan completed his higher studies in France during 2001 and 2002 graduating with a Licentiate in Liturgy and Sacramental Theology; returning to Australia in 2003 as parish priest of Blayney. In 2008 he was appointed as Diocesan Administrator in the Diocese of Bathurst; promoted to Diocesan Chancellor to 2009; to the Dean of the Cathedral in 2010; and concurrently as the Vicar General in 2012.

== Bishop of Sale ==
In December 2014 it was announced that Pope Francis had appointed O'Regan as the Bishop of Sale, replacing Christopher Prowse, who became the Archbishop of Canberra-Goulburn. O'Regan was consecrated and installed as Bishop on 26 February 2015, by Archbishop Denis Hart.

== Archbishop of Adelaide ==
On 19 March 2020 it was announced that Pope Francis had appointed O'Regan as the Archbishop of Adelaide. He was installed as Archbishop of Adelaide on 25 May 2020 at a small ceremony, due to COVID-19 restrictions, at St Francis Xavier's Cathedral, Adelaide, South Australia. O’Regan is the Grand Prior of the South Australia Lieutenancy of the Equestrian Order of the Holy Sepulchre of Jerusalem.

== See also ==
- Roman Catholicism in Australia

Catholic Church titles
Preceded by Philip Wilson	Roman Catholic Archbishop of Adelaide; 2020–present	Incumbent
Preceded by Christopher Prowse	Roman Catholic Bishop of Sale; 2014–2020	Succeeded by Gregory Bennet
