= St Francis Xavier's Cathedral, Adelaide =

Roman Catholic cathedral in Adelaide, South Australia

St Francis Xavier's Cathedral
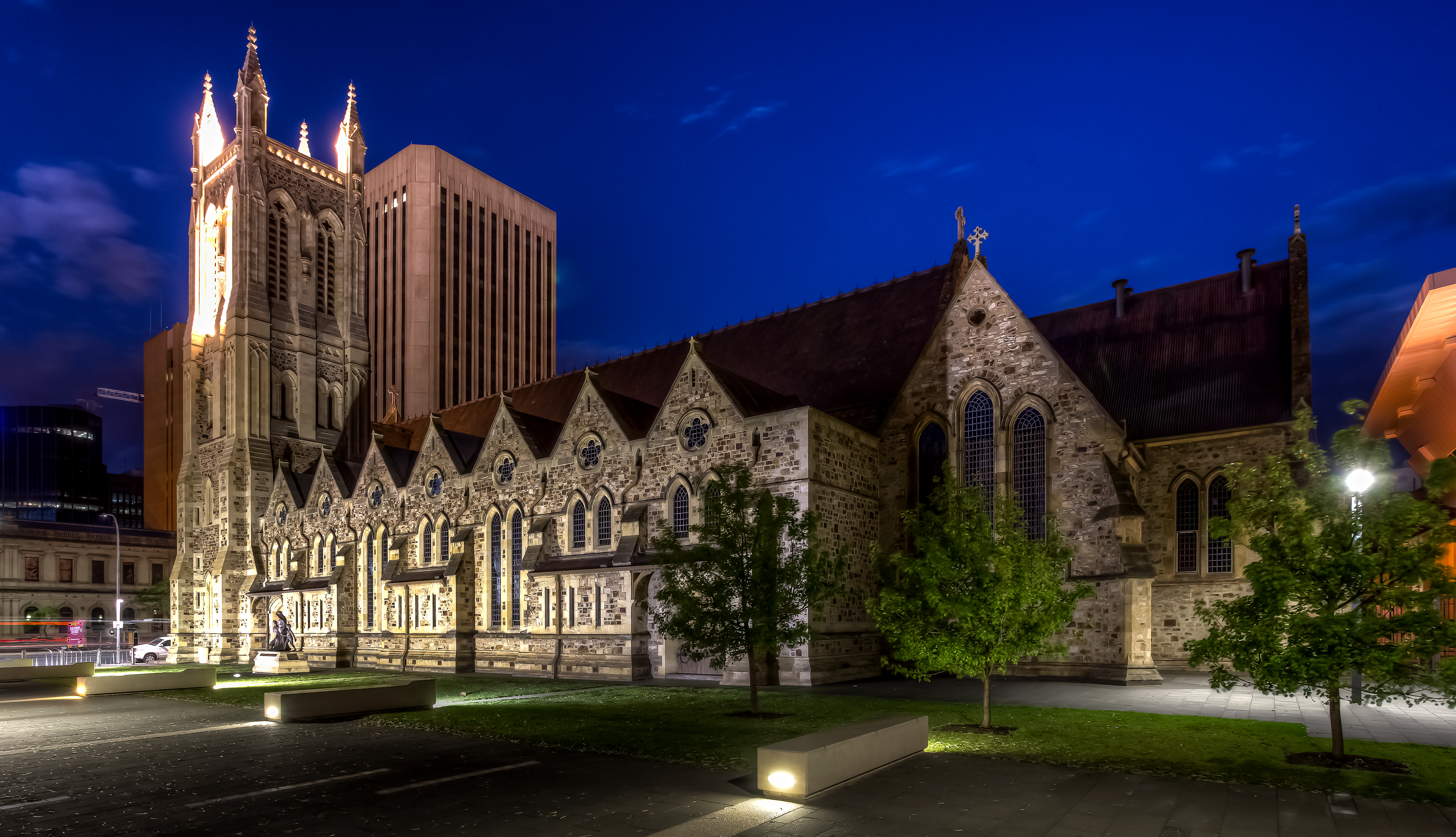
- The cathedral at night
- St Francis Xavier's Cathedral
- 34°55′44″S 138°36′05″E
- Location: Adelaide, South Australia
- Country: Australia
- Denomination: Catholic Church
- Website: www.adelcathparish.org

History
- Status: Cathedral
- Consecrated: 11 July 1858 (Stage 1); 18 April 1926 (Stage 2); 11 July 1996 (Stage 3)

Architecture
- Architect(s): Richard Lambeth, Charles Hansom, Peter Paul Pugin, Lynton Jury
- Style: Gothic Revival
- Groundbreaking: 17 March 1856
- Completed: 11 July 1996

Specifications
- Height: 36 metres (118 ft)

Administration
- Archdiocese: Archdiocese of Adelaide

Clergy
- Archbishop: Patrick O'Regan
- Priest: Anthoni Adimai

St Francis Xavier's Cathedral is a Roman Catholic cathedral in Adelaide, South Australia. It is classified as being a Gothic Revival building in the Early English style. The foundation stone was laid in 1856 and the building was dedicated in 1858.

Construction of the tower began in 1887 and was completed in 1996. The tower stands 36 metres (118 ft) high and measures 56.5 metres (185 ft) in length and 29.5 metres (97 ft) in width.

== History ==
In 1838, two years after the proclamation of South Australia, an advertisement was put up to organise religious meetings for South Australian Catholics. The first Mass was celebrated in a house on East Terrace in 1840. In 1845, a Catholic primary school was set up and used as the religious centre for Catholics until the foundation stone for a cathedral was laid in 1851 for a design by Richard Lambeth. However, with a gold rush in Victoria, Lambeth left along with many of the population, leaving no plans and with the community in economic depression.

The original foundation stone was put in place on 17 March 1856 by the vicar general, Father Michael Ryan, with the first part of the cathedral being dedicated on 11 July 1858. It was first extended when construction began at the southern end of the cathedral, including the sanctuary, side chapel, lady chapel and sacristy in January 1859. Construction of the first extension finished the following year in November 1860. With further growth in the population of Adelaide, another extension was required to seat more worshippers. In November 1886, Bishop Reynolds laid the foundation stone for an extension on the eastern side for a further 200 people, as well as new vestries and confessionals. These were completed in August the following year. In 1904, electric lighting was introduced.

The cornerstone of the current bell tower was laid in 1887, but the lower part was only built between 1923 and 1926 during expansion work on the cathedral, when the western aisle was also extended. The expanded building was opened in April 1926 by Archbishop Robert Spence.

On 8 March 1931, Spence dedicated the octagonal pulpit, designed by Adelaide architect Herbert Jory, with its intricate and detailed decoration carved out of Australian blackwood. It was erected as a memorial to Roman Catholic soldiers who had died in World War I and is regarded as an important example of church furniture.

In April 1987, Giuseppe (Joe) Emanuele of Emmanuel Group of Companies from Adelaide, engaged Architect John Della Putta, to direct the architectural works, and the young Italian engineer Nicola Ubaldo Francesco (Nic) Moffa for the execution of the shop drawings for the bell tower's construction. Joe, a businessman who had migrated from Italy, had reopened a limestone quarry to extract the material required, and purchased all the equipment for the execution of the stone carving, which was executed by Bernfried (Bernie) Koesters, a specialist stone carver migrated from Germany.

Moffa executed the shop drawings between April 1987 and December 1988. In May 1988, Moffa and his wife Elena moved back to Italy. From the period May to December 1988, Moffa purchased a computer and CAD software (in Italy) and completed the shop drawings free of charge. The CAD was used to establish the breaking points for the formation of the joints. In particular, the main windows needed to be formed by various stones to reduce excessive weight and ensure their manageability during installation.

The stone carving was executed by Bernie Koesters at the former Holden factory on Port Road where all the stones were stored in their course order as planned by Moffa. During the execution of the stone carving, Koesters prepared a few assembly tests, assisted by Moffa and other employees from Emmanuel Group of Companies, to ensure the stones would fit perfectly during their installation/construction. By 1989, all stonework was completed and ready for installation.

It was not until 1996 that the bell tower was finally completed, by the architect Lynton Jury, 109 years after construction of the tower commenced. The bell used in the tower is the Murphy Bell of 1867, surrounded by thirteen other bells hung for change ringing, installed in 1996. Seven of these bells date from 1881 and were previously in St Mary's Cathedral, Sydney.

The cathedral suffered significant damage in the 1954 Adelaide earthquake.

== Features ==
Located at the north-western corner is a statue of St John the Baptist, which was carved in Tuscany in 1925 and features a picture of the baptism of Jesus. The lady chapel altar, located at the south-west, is made from Carrara marble with inset panels of simulated lapis lazuli (although many texts erroneously describe it as real) and was dedicated in 1954. Bronze statues of Joseph and Jesus and the flight into Egypt are also depicted on the western side of the cathedral. At the front of the cathedral, the southern end, are lancet windows featuring images of St Patrick and St Lawrence, as well depictions of the life of Mary and Jesus. The eastern side of the cathedral features a statue of St Patrick, the patron of the Archdiocese of Adelaide, with Celtic symbols prevalent in the surroundings.

The cathedral has had three organs during its history. The first was put in place in 1869 by Johann Wolff, with two pedals and one manual. It was replaced in 1926 by J. E. Dodd with two manuals, which was subsequently rebuilt in 1954.

The bells are rung by members of The Australian and New Zealand Association of Bellringers.

== Services ==
The cathedral is open daily from early morning until evening, with Mass celebrated three times daily. The cathedral also maintains a choir.

== Cathedral parish ==
Along with the Cathedral, St Mary's church in Lower North Adelaide, Our Lady Queen of Angels church in Thebarton, St John Vianney church in Burnside, St Peter Claver church in Dulwich, Holy Name church in Stepney, Our Lady of Perpetual Help church on Kangaroo Island, and St Patrick's church in Grote Street all form part of the Adelaide Cathedral Parish.

== Gallery ==
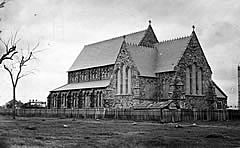
The cathedral in 1863

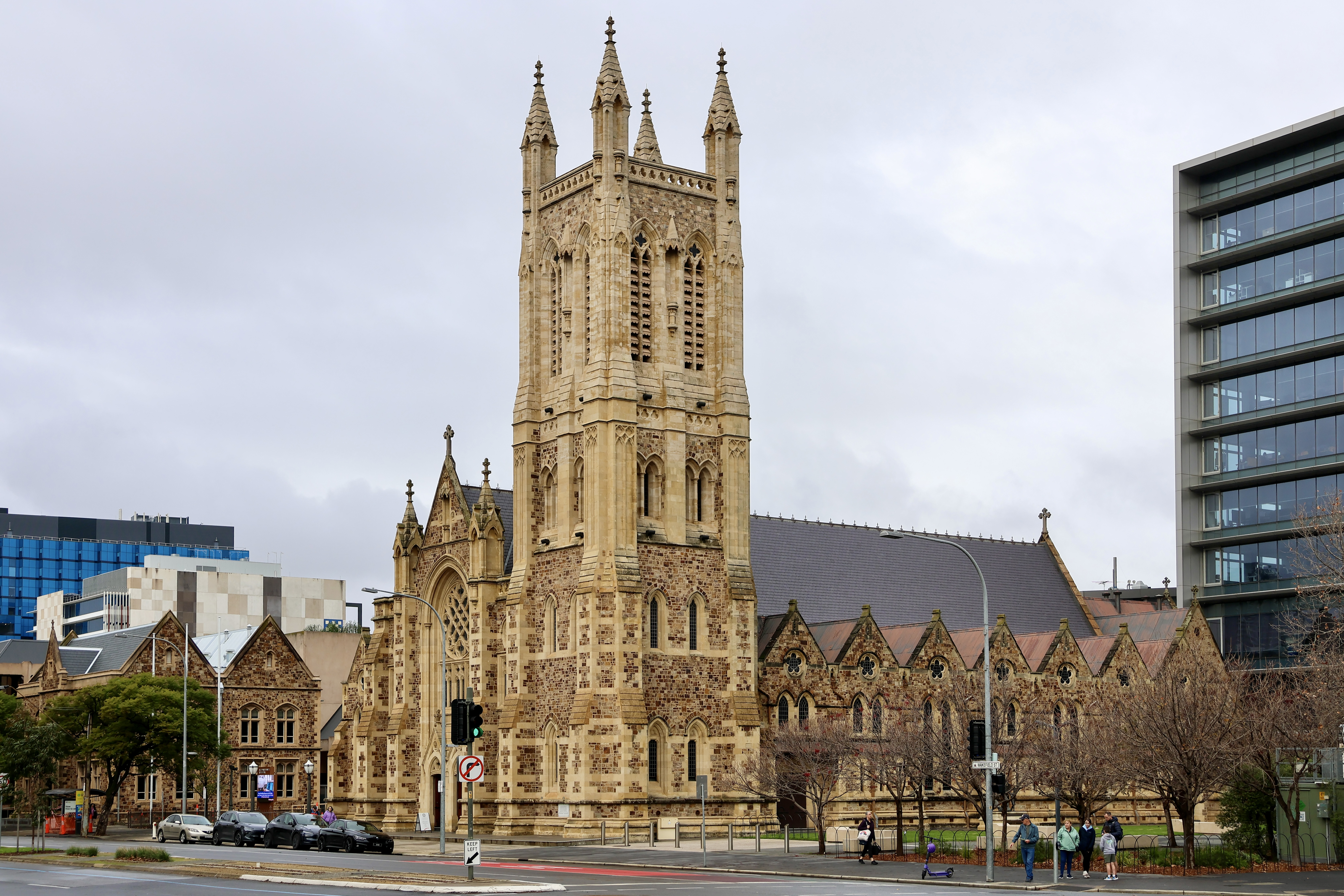
View from Victoria Square

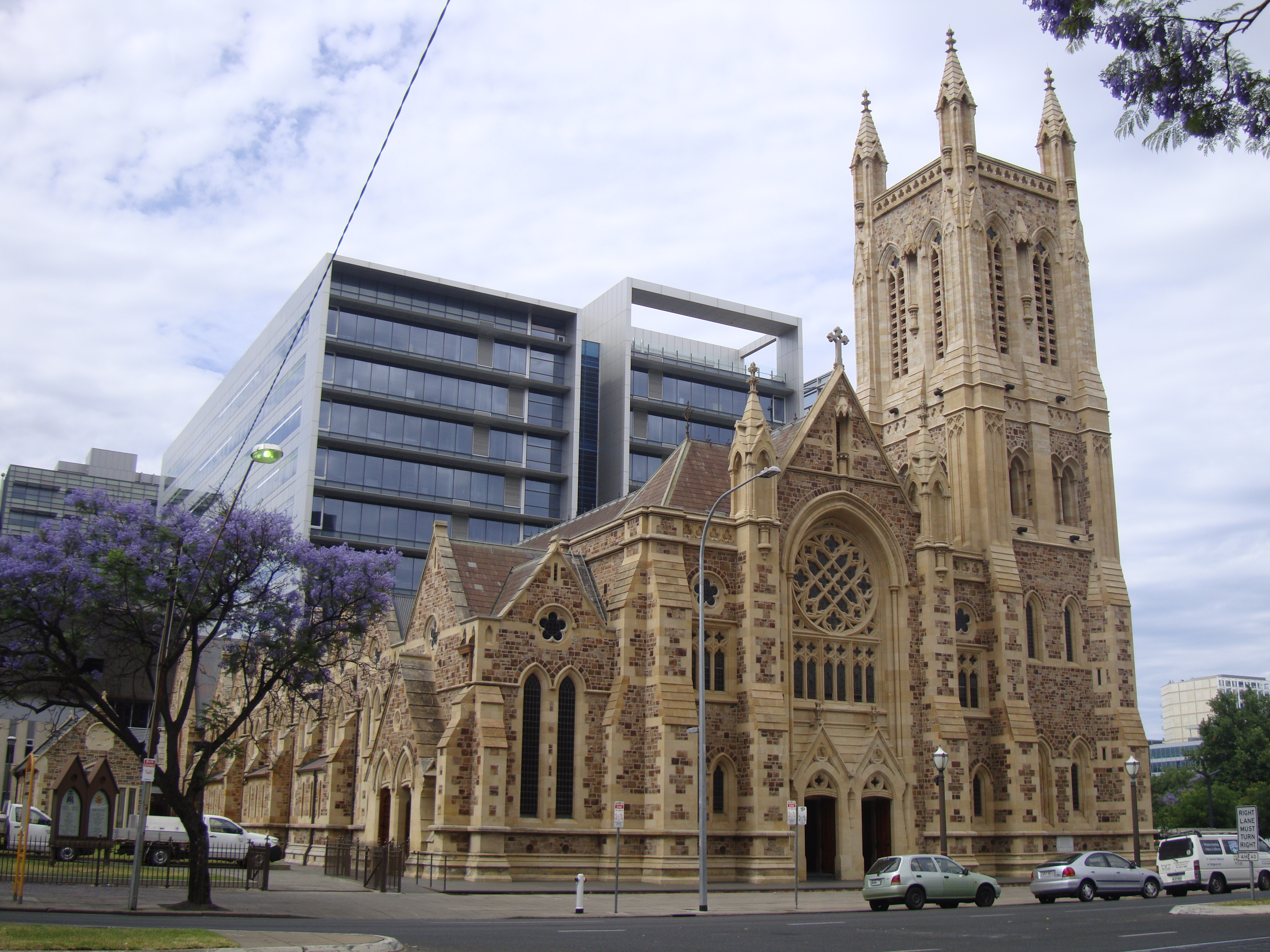
Front aspect (across Wakefield St)

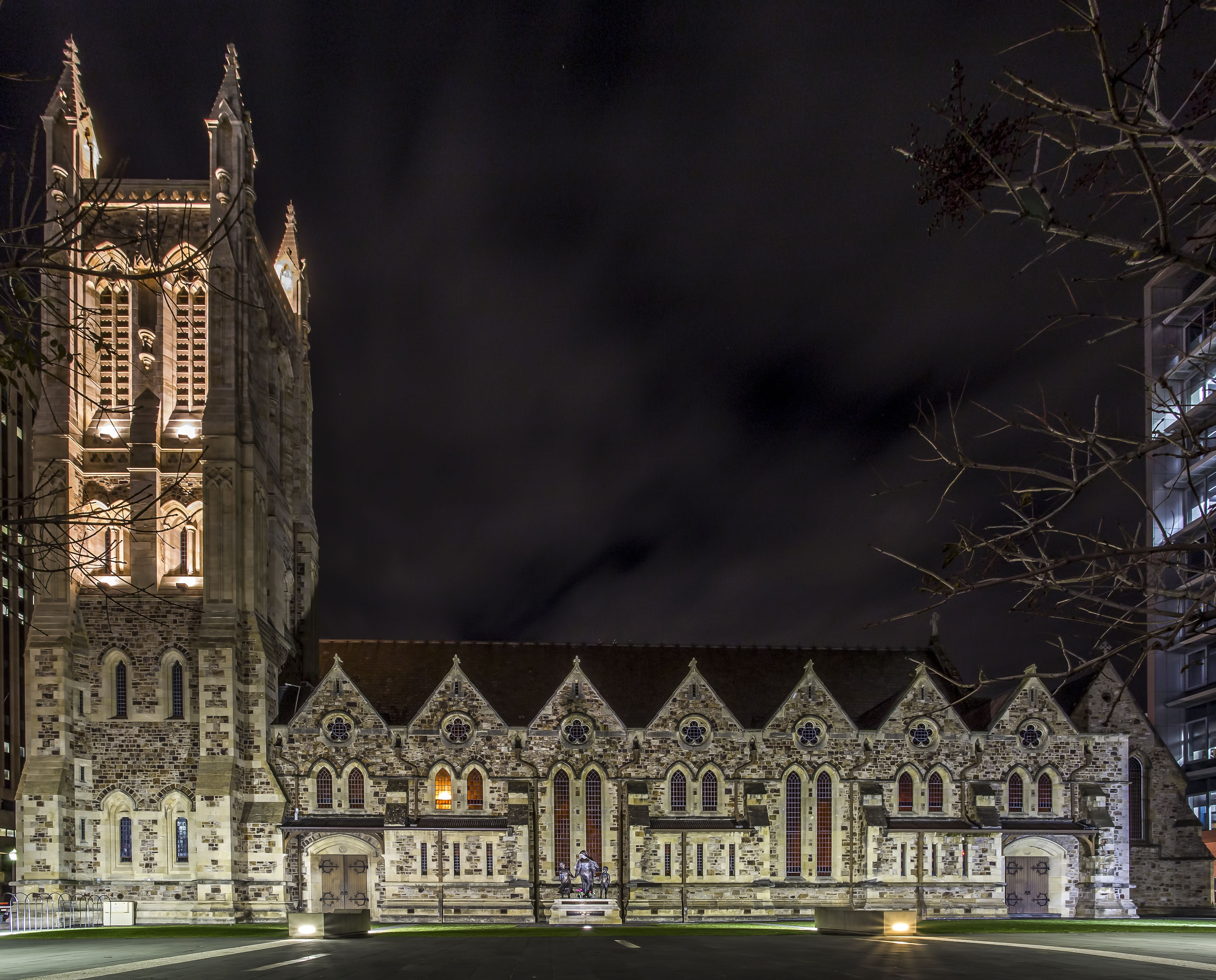
Night view

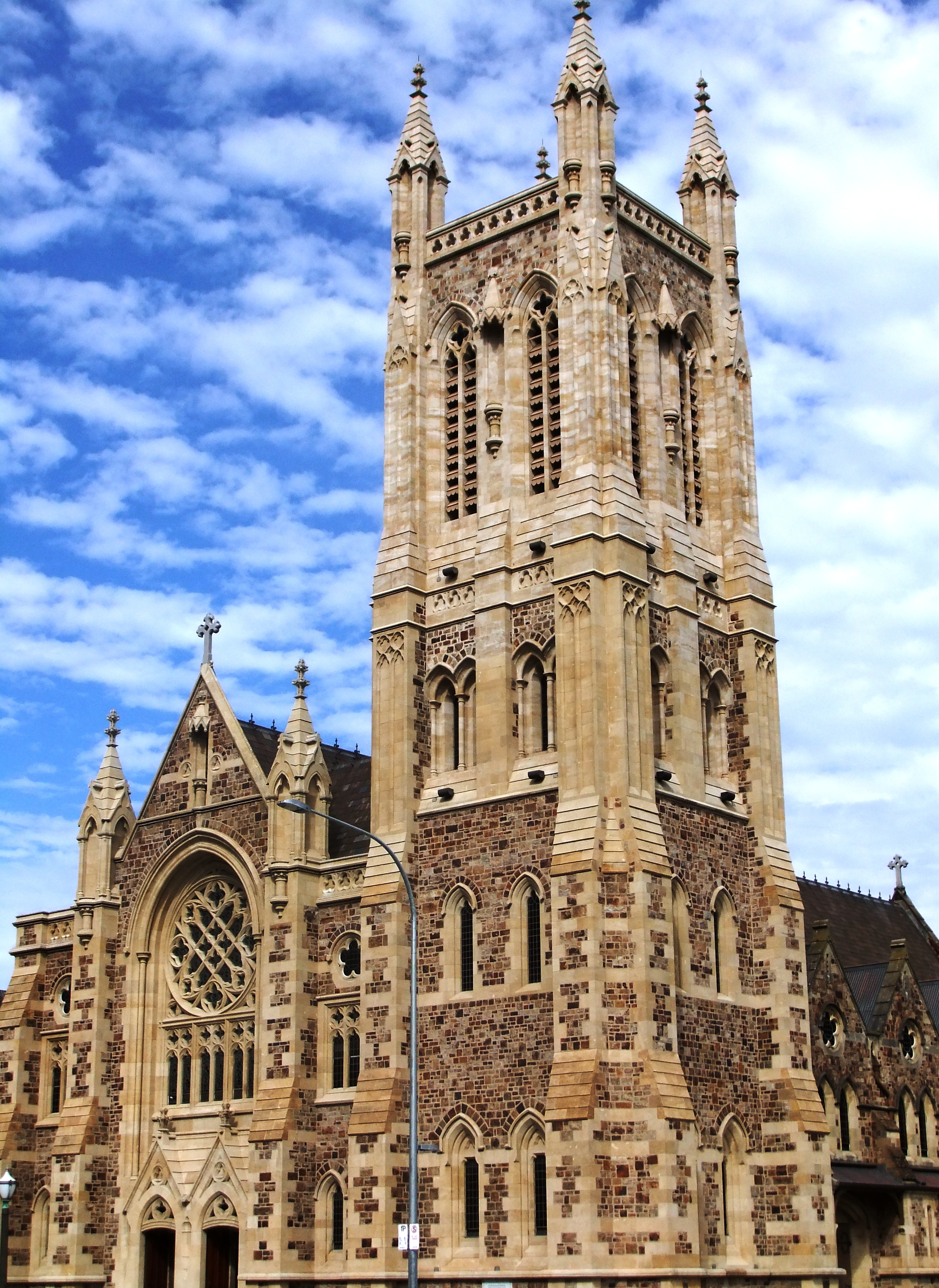
Tower

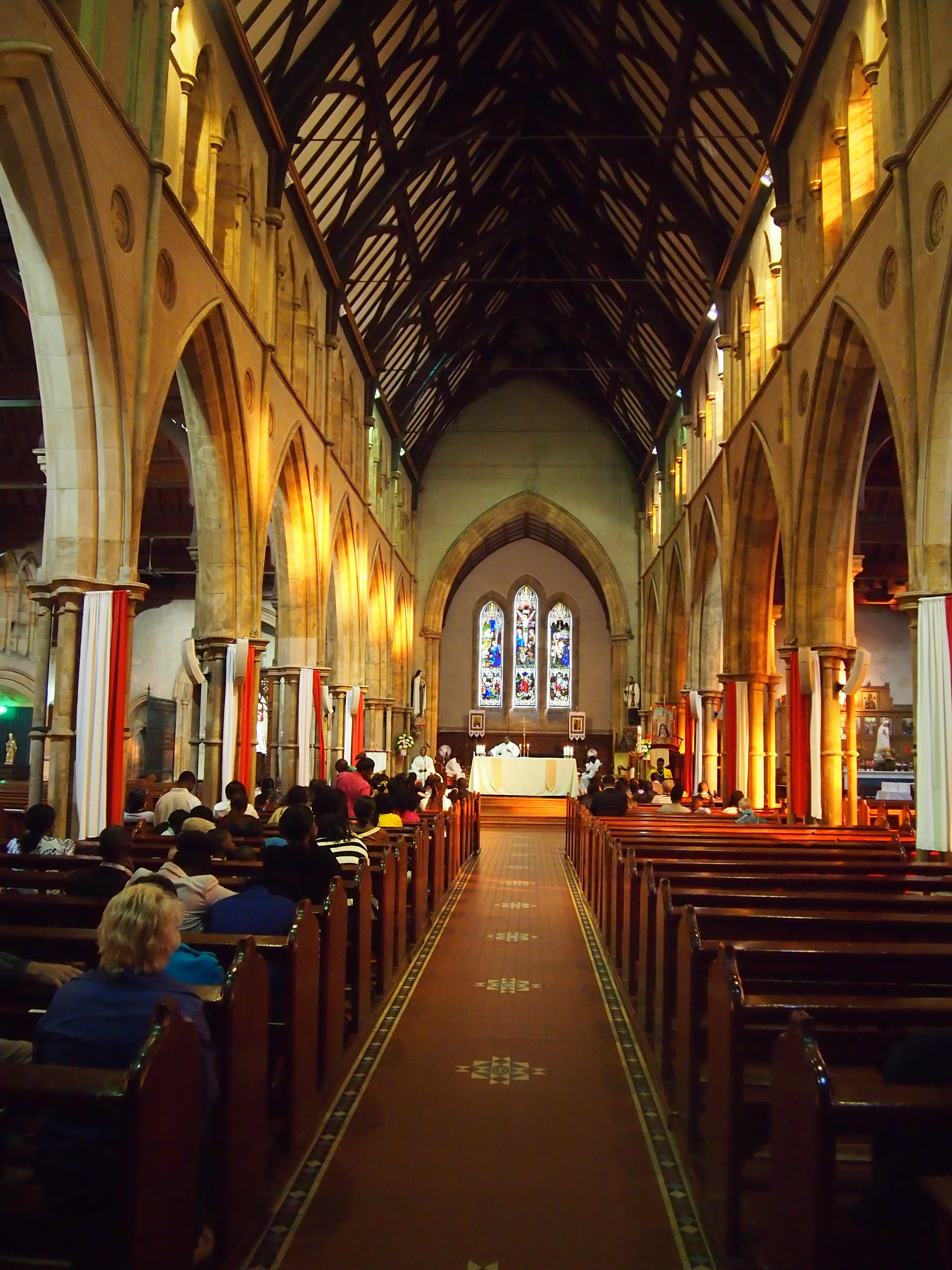
Interior

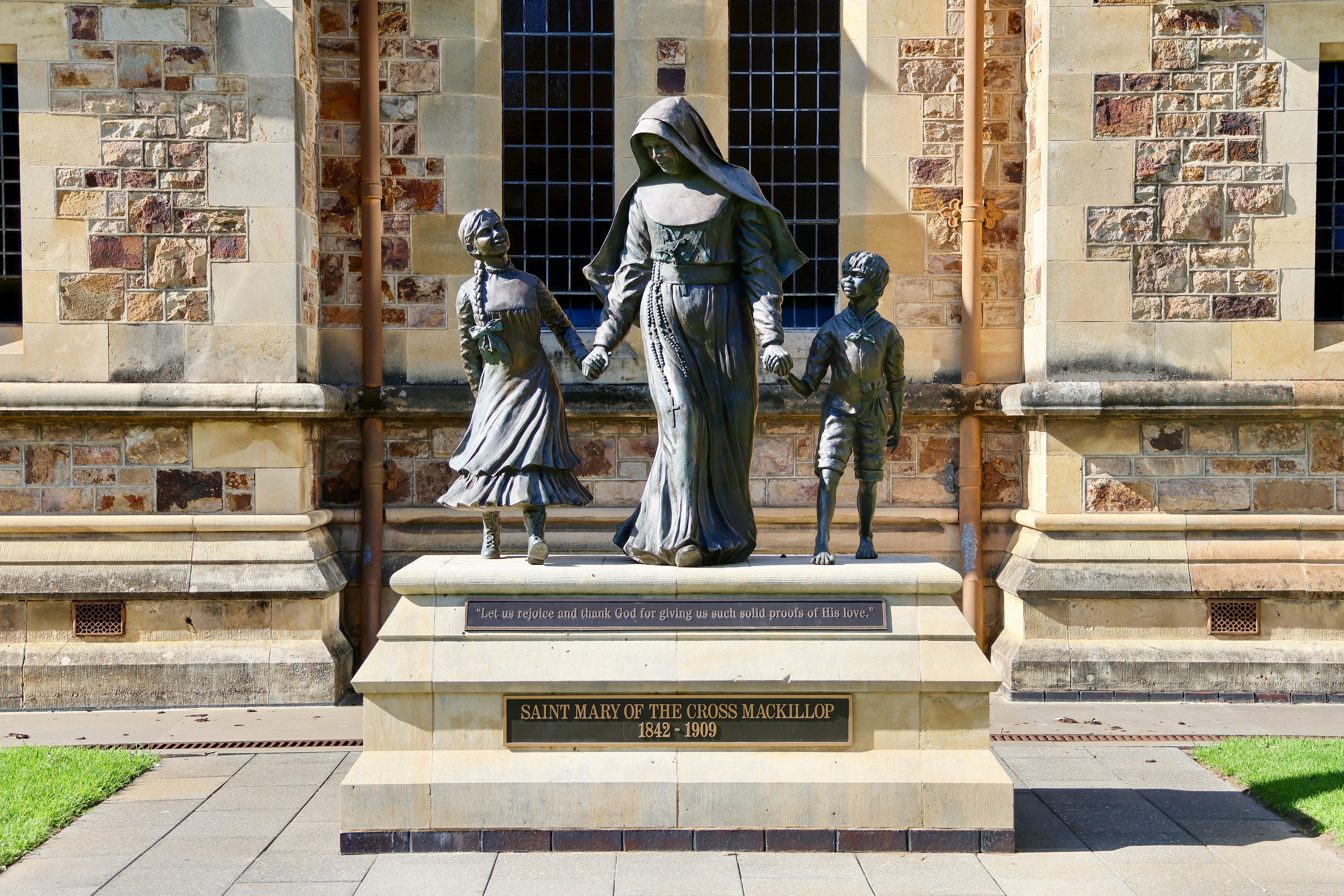
Statue of Saint Mary MacKillop

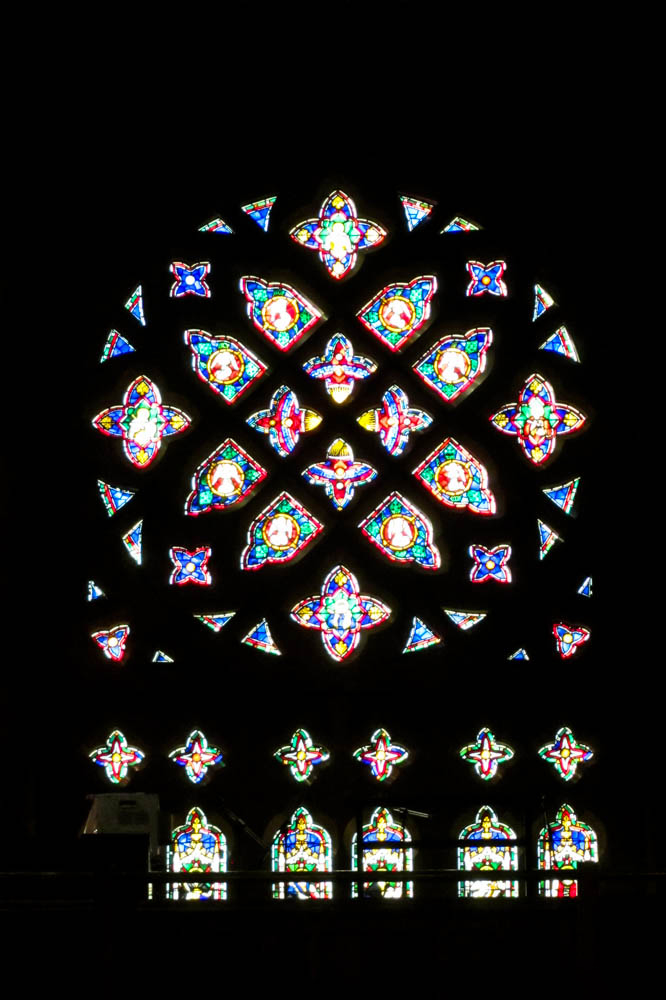
Rose Window

== See also ==
- Fennescey House
