= List of Catholic archbishops of Sydney =

Archdiocese of Sydney
- Adopted: 1842
- Crest: Mitre and shield
- Torse: None
- Shield: Crux (Southern Cross); cross
- Supporters: None

This is a list of the bishops and archbishops of the Archdiocese of Sydney since 1842. The archbishop also holds the title of Catholic Primate of Australia.

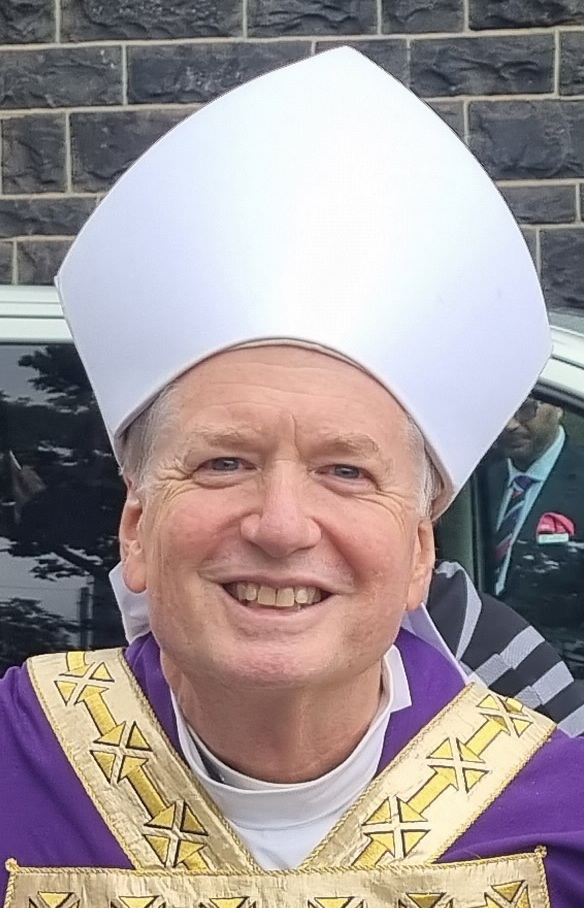
Current Archbishop of Sydney, Anthony Fisher OP

== List of bishops ==
Order	Name	Title	Date enthroned	Reign ended	Term of office	Reason for term end	Notes
1	John Bede Polding, OSB	Bishop of Sydney	5 April 1842	22 April 1842	17 days	Elevated to Archbishop of Sydney	

== List of archbishops ==
Order	Name	Title	Date enthroned	Reign ended	Term of office	Reason for term end	Notes
1	John Bede Polding, OSB	Archbishop of Sydney	22 April 1842	16 March 1877	34 years, 328 days	Died in office	
2	Roger Bede Vaughan, OSB	Coadjutor Archbishop of Sydney	28 February 1873	16 March 1877	4 years, 16 days	Elevated to Archbishop of Sydney	
2	Roger Bede Vaughan, OSB	Archbishop of Sydney	16 March 1877	17 August 1883	6 years, 154 days	Died in office	
3	Patrick Cardinal Moran	Archbishop of Sydney	14 March 1884	17 August 1911	27 years, 156 days	Died in office	
3	Patrick Cardinal Moran	Cardinal-Priest of Santa Susanna	27 July 1885	17 August 1911	26 years, 21 days	Died in office	
4	Michael Kelly	Coadjutor Archbishop of Sydney	16 July 1901	17 August 1911	10 years, 32 days	Elevated to Archbishop of Sydney	
4	Michael Kelly	Archbishop of Sydney	17 August 1911	8 March 1940	28 years, 204 days	Died in office	
5	Sir Norman Cardinal Gilroy, KBE	Coadjutor Archbishop of Sydney	1 July 1937	8 March 1940	2 years, 251 days	Elevated to Archbishop of Sydney	
5	Sir Norman Cardinal Gilroy, KBE	Archbishop of Sydney	8 March 1940	9 July 1971	31 years, 123 days	Retired as Archbishop Emeritus of Sydney	
5	Sir Norman Cardinal Gilroy, KBE	Cardinal-Priest of Santi Quattro Coronati	18 February 1946	21 October 1977	31 years, 245 days	Died in office	
6	Sir James Cardinal Freeman, KBE	Archbishop of Sydney	9 July 1971	12 February 1983	11 years, 218 days	Retired as Archbishop Emeritus of Sydney	
6	Sir James Cardinal Freeman, KBE	Cardinal-Priest of Santa Maria Regina Pacis in Ostia mare	5 March 1973	16 March 1991	18 years, 11 days	Died in office	
7	Edward Cardinal Clancy, AC	Auxiliary Bishop of Sydney	25 October 1973	24 Nov 1978	3 years, 30 days	Elevated to Archbishop of Canberra (and Goulburn)	
7	Edward Cardinal Clancy, AC	Archbishop of Sydney	12 February 1983	26 March 2001	18 years, 42 days	Retired as Archbishop Emeritus of Sydney	
7	Edward Cardinal Clancy, AC	Cardinal-Priest of Santa Maria in Vallicella	28 June 1988	3 August 2014	26 years, 36 days	Died in office	
8	George Cardinal Pell, AC	Archbishop of Sydney	26 March 2001	24 February 2014	12 years, 335 days	Elevated to Prefect of the Secretariat for the Economy	
8	George Cardinal Pell, AC	Cardinal-Priest of Santa Maria Domenica Mazzarello	21 October 2003	10 January 2023	19 years, 81 days		
9	Anthony Fisher, OP	Auxiliary Bishop of Sydney	3 September 2003	4 March 2010	6 years, 182 days	Elevated to Bishop of Parramatta	
9	Anthony Fisher, OP	Bishop of Parramatta	4 March 2010	12 November 2014	4 years, 253 days	Elevated to Archbishop of Sydney	
9	Anthony Fisher, OP	Archbishop of Sydney	12 November 2014	present	4383 days		

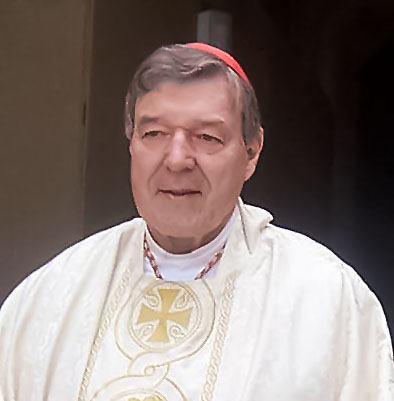
Pell in 2006

== Auxiliary bishops ==
Order	Name	Title	Date enthroned	Reign ended	Term of office	Reason for term end	Notes
1	Joseph Higgins	Auxiliary Bishop of Sydney	11 September 1888	4 May 1899	10 years, 235 days	Elevated to Bishop of Rockhampton	
2	Michael Sheehan	Coadjutor Archbishop of Sydney	22 February 1922	1 July 1937	15 years, 129 days	Retired as Coadjutor Archbishop Emeritus of Sydney	
2	Michael Sheehan	Coadjutor Archbishop Emeritus of Sydney	1 July 1937	1 March 1945	7 years, 243 days	Died in office	
3	Eris O'Brien	Auxiliary Bishop of Sydney	5 February 1948	16 November 1953	5 years, 284 days	Elevated to Archbishop of Canberra (and Goulburn)	
4	Patrick Lyons	Auxiliary Bishop of Sydney	8 March 1950	11 October 1956	6 years, 217 days	Elevated to Coadjutor Bishop of Sale	
5	James Patrick Carroll	Auxiliary Bishop of Sydney	6 January 1954	23 July 1984	30 years, 199 days	Retired as Auxiliary Bishop Emeritus of Sydney	
5	James Patrick Carroll	Auxiliary Bishop Emeritus of Sydney	23 July 1984	14 January 1995	10 years, 175 days	Died in office	
6	James Darcy Freeman (later Sir James Cardinal Freeman, KBE)	Auxiliary Bishop of Sydney	9 December 1956	18 October 1968	11 years, 314 days	Elevated to Bishop of Armidale	
7	Thomas William Muldoon	Auxiliary Bishop of Sydney	1 March 1960	6 September 1982	22 years, 189 days	Retired as Auxiliary Bishop Emeritus of Sydney	
7	Thomas William Muldoon	Auxiliary Bishop Emeritus of Sydney	6 September 1982	13 January 1986	3 years, 129 days	Died in office	
8	Edward Francis Kelly, MSC	Auxiliary Bishop of Sydney	6 February 1969	19 December 1975	6 years, 316 days	Elevated to Bishop of Toowoomba	
9	Edward Bede Clancy (later Edward Cardinal Clancy, AC)	Auxiliary Bishop of Sydney	23 October 1973	24 November 1978	5 years, 32 days	Elevated to Archbishop of Canberra (and Goulburn)	
10	David Cremin	Auxiliary Bishop of Sydney	25 October 1973	22 February 2005	31 years, 120 days	Retired as Auxiliary Bishop Emeritus of Sydney	
10	David Cremin	Auxiliary Bishop Emeritus of Sydney	22 February 2005	present	21 years, 263 days	incumbent	
11	Bede Vincent Heather	Auxiliary Bishop of Sydney	23 October 1973	24 November 1978	5 years, 32 days	Elevated to Bishop of Parramatta	
12	John Edward Heaps	Auxiliary Bishop of Sydney	4 September 1981	12 March 1992	10 years, 190 days	Retired as Auxiliary Bishop Emeritus of Sydney	
12	John Edward Heaps	Auxiliary Bishop Emeritus of Sydney	12 March 1992	21 June 2004	12 years, 101 days	Died in office	
13	Patrick Laurence Murphy	Auxiliary Bishop of Sydney	20 December 1976	8 April 1986	9 years, 109 days	Elevated to Bishop of Broken Bay	
14	Geoffrey Robinson	Auxiliary Bishop of Sydney	23 January 1984	15 July 2004	20 years, 174 days	Retired as Auxiliary Bishop Emeritus of Sydney	
14	Geoffrey Robinson	Auxiliary Bishop Emeritus of Sydney	15 July 2004	29 December 2020	22 years, 120 days	Died in office	
15	Peter Ingham	Auxiliary Bishop of Sydney	24 May 1993	8 April 1986	8 years, 13 days	Elevated to Bishop of Wollongong	
16	Julian Porteous	Auxiliary Bishop of Sydney	16 July 2003	19 July 2013	10 years, 3 days	Elevated to Archbishop of Hobart	
17	Anthony Fisher, OP	Auxiliary Bishop of Sydney	3 September 2003	4 March 2010	6 years, 182 days	Elevated to Bishop of Parramatta	
18	Terry Brady	Auxiliary Bishop of Sydney	4 October 2007	10 October 2022	15 years, 6 days	Retired as Auxiliary Bishop emeritus of Sydney	
19	Peter Comensoli	Auxiliary Bishop of Sydney	20 April 2011	27 February 2014	2 years, 313 days	Elevated to Apostolic Administrator of Sydney	
19	Peter Comensoli	Apostolic Administrator of Sydney	27 February 2014	20 November 2014	266 days	Elevated to Bishop of Broken Bay	
20	Anthony Randazzo	Auxiliary Bishop of Sydney	24 August 2016	7 October 2019	3 years, 13 days	Elevated to Bishop of Broken Bay	
21	Richard Umbers	Auxiliary Bishop of Sydney	24 August 2016	present	10 years, 49 days	incumbent	

== See also ==
- Roman Catholicism in Australia
- St Mary's Cathedral, Sydney
