= Anthony Percy =

Australian Latin Catholic bishop (born 1963)

The Most Reverend Anthony Percy
- Auxiliary Bishop of Sydney; Titular Bishop of Appiaria
- Archdiocese: Sydney
- See: Appiaria
- Appointed: 11 February 2025
- Installed: 2 May 2025

Orders
- Ordination: 14 December 1990 by Francis Carroll
- Consecration: 2 May 2025 by Anthony Fisher

Personal details
- Born: Anthony Gerard Percy; 8 April 1963 (age 63) Rockdale, New South Wales, Australia
- Denomination: Catholic Church
- Education: University of New South Wales; St Patrick's Seminary
- Motto: Hope In God
- Coat of arms

Styles of Anthony Percy
- Reference style: The Most Reverend
- Spoken style: His Lordship or My Lord Bishop
- Religious style: Bishop

Anthony Gerard Percy (born 8 April 1963) is an Australian Catholic bishop. He has served as an auxiliary bishop of the Archdiocese of Sydney since 2025. His episcopal consecration took place on 2 May 2025.

== Early life ==
Percy was born in Rockdale, New South Wales, on 8 April 1963 to John and Joan Percy. His family moved to Cooma in 1966, where he attended St. Patrick's Primary School and Monaro High School. He completed his secondary education at St Joseph's College, Hunters Hill. Percy attended the University of New South Wales, completing an honours degree in finance, and was part of Warrane College.

== Priesthood ==
Percy attended St Patrick's Seminary in Manly before he was ordained a priest by Francis Carroll for the Archdiocese of Canberra and Goulburn on 14 December 1990. After his ordination, Percy first served in the parish of Young. He went on to serve in Queanbeyan, Ariah Park, Ardlethan, and Barellan. From 1999 to 2003, he attended the Catholic University of America in Washington, D.C., obtaining a Doctorate in Sacred Theology from the John Paul II Institute.

Upon his return to Australia, Percy served as parish priest for Goulburn. In 2008, George Pell invited Percy to serve as rector of the Seminary of the Good Shepherd. Percy served as rector from 2009 to 2014. Following his term as rector, he served as the vicar general for the Archdiocese of Canberra and Goulburn from 2015 to 2023.

== Episcopate ==
On 11 February 2025, Percy was appointed auxiliary bishop of the Archdiocese of Sydney and titular bishop of Appiaria by Pope Francis. Percy was consecrated on 2 May by Anthony Fisher at St Mary's Cathedral, Sydney. Percy maintains a Substack blog titled The Scaffolding Newsletter and posts a version on YouTube.

In September 2025, Percy attended a formation course for new bishops in Rome, meeting with Pope Leo XIV.

== Writings ==
- Percy, Anthony (2005). Theology of the Body Made Simple. Connor Court. ISBN 978-0-9758015-1-2.
- ——— (2010). Entrepreneurship in the Catholic Tradition. Lexington Books. ISBN 978-0-7391-2514-4.
- ——— (2022). Australia: What Went Right? What Went Wrong?. Connor Court. ISBN 978-1-922815-24-8.
