= Richard Umbers =

Australian Latin Catholic bishop (born 1971)

The Most Reverend Richard Umbers
- Auxiliary Bishop of Sydney; Titular Bishop of Thala
- Archdiocese: Sydney
- See: Thala
- Appointed: 24 June 2016
- Installed: 24 August 2016

Orders
- Ordination: 1 September 2002 by Javier Echevarría Rodríguez
- Consecration: 24 August 2016 by Anthony Fisher

Personal details
- Born: Richard James Umbers; 17 March 1971 (age 55) Ōtāhuhu, New Zealand
- Denomination: Catholic Church
- Education: University of Waikato; University of Sydney; Pontifical University of the Holy Cross; University of Navarre
- Motto: Latin: Fides et ratio, lit. 'Faith and reason'
- Coat of arms: Richard Umbers's coat of arms

Styles of Richard Umbers
- Reference style: The Most Reverend
- Spoken style: His Lordship or My Lord Bishop
- Religious style: Bishop

Richard James Umbers (born 17 March 1971) is an Australian Catholic bishop. He is currently an auxiliary bishop of the Archdiocese of Sydney and is the first priest of Opus Dei to be appointed a bishop in Australia.

== Early life ==
Umbers was born in Ōtāhuhu, New Zealand, on 17 March 1971 to Declan (1927–2013) and Mary (1933–2019) Umbers. He is the youngest of five children and the brother of Anthony, Andrew, Gregory and Margaret. He was raised in Papatoetoe. He originally studied management at the University of Waikato in 1989 but transferred to the University of Sydney in 1992 to receive more intense formation at a centre of Opus Dei in Chatswood, New South Wales. He graduated with a Bachelor of Economics from the University of Sydney and a Masters of Management from the University of Waikato, New Zealand.

== Priesthood ==
Umbers entered the Roman College of the Holy Cross, the international seminary of Opus Dei seminary in Rome, in 1996 and studied at Pontifical University of the Holy Cross, Rome, achieving a Bachelor of Theology degree in 1999.

Between 1999 and 2002, Umbers studied at the University of Navarre, Spain, where he received a Doctor of Philosophy degree. On 14 February 2002 he was ordained a deacon and was subsequently ordained a priest by Bishop Javier Echevarría, a prelate of Opus Dei, on 1 September 2002 at the Marian shrine of Torreciudad, Spain.

Umbers has been based in Sydney since 2003, and has been chaplain of several educational institutions including Warrane College (2003–04; 2012–16) and Creston College (2012–16), residential colleges affiliated with the University of New South Wales, and Redfield College (2005–11), a school of the Parents for Education foundation. He has been a lecturer for the Centre for Faith, Ethics and Society at the University of Notre Dame Australia.

== Episcopate ==
Umbers was appointed Auxiliary Bishop of Sydney by Pope Francis on 24 June 2016 along with Anthony Randazzo, he was given the titular see of Thala in Tunisia. They were consecrated by Anthony Fisher on 24 August 2016 in St Mary's Cathedral, Sydney. He sits on the council of priests of the Archdiocese of Sydney on behalf of Fisher and is a representative for the archdiocese to the St John of God hospitals. He is published in the field of philosophy, regularly addresses youth gatherings, has an interest in social media, and has a library of his own podcasts. He runs a Twitter account named "Bishop Down Umber", the name of which is a pun on his nationality, and a Christianity and Theology themed meme page on Instagram named "bishopumbers". Umbers was naturalised as an Australian Citizen on 15 April 2024.

On 1 July 2025, the Vicar-General for the Archdiocese of Sydney, Samuel Lynch, announced that “[t]he Archdiocese of Sydney has received notice of a civil claim of historical abuse. Auxiliary Bishop Richard Umbers has been identified as the subject of this claim. Bishop Umbers emphatically denies the allegation.” Accordingly, the Archdiocese notified the authorities of the complaint, in accordance with its obligations. The NSW Police also confirmed that there was no active investigation into Umbers. Two months later, the investigation concluded that the accusation was "not sustained" and Umbers returned to ministry.
