= Masso (surname) =

Masso is a surname. Notable people with the surname include:

- Charlie Masso, (born 1969), Puerto Rican singer and actor
- Eduardo Masso (born 1964), Argentina-born Belgian former tennis professional
- Edward Masso (born 1955), American businessman and retired United States Navy Rear Admiral
- George Masso (1926–2019), American musician
- Gildo Massó (1926–2007), Puerto Rican entrepreneur
- Jericó Abramo Masso, Mexican politician
- John Masso (1932–2003), Australian priest
- Jorge Massó (born 1950), Cuban former footballer
- Liudys Masso, Cuban paralympian
- Luca Masso (born 1994), Argentine field hockey player
- Maykel Massó, (born 1999), Cuban long jumper
- Valjo Masso (1933–2013), Estonian agronomist and politician

== See also ==
- Massa (surname)
- Masso (disambiguation)
