= John Masso =

Juan Antonio (John) Masso (17 June 1932 – 2003) was the second head of Opus Dei in Australia, succeeding Fr James Albrecht who established Opus Dei in Australia in 1963 and being followed by Fr George Rossman. Then Rev Inigo Martinez-Echevarria. His title was Regional Vicar of Opus Dei or counsellor of Opus Dei in Australia.

== Biography ==
John Masso was born in Barcelona on 17 June 1932, one of seven children. He studied Commerce at the University of Barcelona and during that time, asked to join Opus Dei, while continuing to support himself by working for a time in his father's business. Later, Fr John studied Canon Law at the University of Navarre and was ordained a priest in 1965.

Fr John showed transparency in his leadership as counsellor of Opus Dei in Australia. During the protests in the 1970s against Warrane College, Fr John approached the Sydney Morning Herald to show Opus Dei's side to the story. Eventually, calls for the closure of Warrane College were rejected by the University of New South Wales. The now well established not-for-profit social enterprise, continues to thrive. Further details, from time to time, are available on the contemporary ACNC website.

Some of the post World War II, 20th century Australian politics of affiliated residential colleges and their establishment arrangements can be found in sources such as the following 1960 Australian PM Transcript at page 10. Also at the following University Colleges Australia reference. In post Napoleonic, 19th-century New South Wales, Archbishop Polding arranged for Rev John Forrest DD to be appointed first Rector of St Johns residential college at Sydney University. During the early 20th Century Cardinal Moran invited the talented and learned Monsignor Hugh McDermott DD to work with him in Sydney. In the lead up to the second vatican council, Cardinal Gilroy spoke with Monsignor Josemaria Escriva DD, now Saint Josemaria, about establishing Warrane College and helping to spread the healthy message about responding to God's call to holiness in everyday life for the baptised ordinary faithful of the people of God. Monsignor Escriva had spent the summer of 1959 in London working with others on the beginnings of Netherhall House, an international Uni-student residence, later opened by Queen Elizabeth The Queen Mother. Fr John made his personal contribution, over some 3 decades, to this grand ongoing challenge of civic life and leadership in Australia.

Fr John had many friends including non-Catholics, for example the Australian Presbyterian moderator, the Reverend Fred McKay. Whilst counsellor of Opus Dei, the message, spread from Sydney to Melbourne, Auckland, Hamilton Tasmania with activities in Perth, Brisbane, Canberra, Newcastle, Wollongong and many other places. Fr John was Regional Vicar of Opus Dei for Australia and New Zealand at the time of the 1983 Code of Canon Law reforms, that saw the formal commencement of the secular Personal Prelatures, under the governance of the Vatican's Congregation for Bishops. Fr John also had local carriage of the 1987 visit of the then Prelate of Opus Dei and the now Blessed Alvaro del Portillo DD, which among other events saw a large gathering of the people of god at the Clancy Auditorium at the University of NSW in January 1987. Fr John on 10 July 1991 travelled to wintery Armidale NSW, (via police escort from Tamworth due to bad weather at Armidale airport) to be in attendance for the consecration and installation service, of Kevin Michael Manning as the eighth Bishop of Armidale, preached at a good number of retreats and 26 June memorial services and helped with the inspiration of a good number of pioneering outreach initiatives. Fr John was made Monsignor by the Archdiocese of Sydney.

Fr John died in Pamplona, Spain, closer to his natural Masso family members who were associated with textile manufacturing and his early supernatural family members, many of whom were involved in establishing the University of Navarre; after passing by Argentina where he had a conference with the Prelate of Opus Dei, Bishop Javier Echevarria. Upon his death, a requiem Mass was celebrated in St Mary's Cathedral by Cardinal George Pell including his predecessor as Archbishop of Sydney, Cardinal Edward Clancy, the Bishop of Lismore, Bishop Geoffrey Jarrett, the Bishop of Broken Bay, Bishop David Walker, Bishop David Cremin and Mons Masso's newly appointed successor, Fr George Rossman. The preacher at the Mass said that Fr John had no enemies. Cardinal Pell remarked, "That's not the Opus Dei I know". A twice yearly bulletin of routine news can be subscribed to online. (Fr John was mentioned in back issue Number 37).

In an interview with the Sydney Morning Herald, Fr. John was asked why, when such a command was basic to many Christian denominations and groupings, a special organisation was needed to promote the sanctity of everyday work. Fr John replied, "Yes, you are right. But how many people do it?".

Fr John's collaborators and friends have set up The Masso Foundation, to continue the work he tirelessly carried out during his life. Some details can be found on the ACNC website.
