= Massol =

Massol is a surname. Notable people with this surname include:

- Alexis Massol González, civil engineer and environmentalist from Puerto Rico
- Jean-Étienne-Auguste Massol (AKA Eugène Massol) (1802–1887), French operatic tenor and later baritone
- Joseph Massol (born 1700), French architect, mainly active in Strasbourg
- René Massol (1927–2010), French water polo player

== See also ==
- Masso (disambiguation)
- Messel, town in Germany
- Mossel, surname
