= John Heaps =

Australian Catholic bishop (1927–2004)

The Most Reverend John Heaps
- Auxiliary bishop emeritus of Archdiocese of Sydney
- Archdiocese: Sydney
- Installed: 31 October 1981
- Term ended: 12 March 1992
- Other post: Titular Bishop of Inis Cathaig (1981–2004)

Orders
- Ordination: 8 March 1958 at St Mary's Cathedral, Sydney by Norman Thomas Gilroy
- Consecration: 31 October 1981 at St Mary's Cathedral, Sydney by James Darcy Freeman

Personal details
- Born: John Edward Heaps; 25 February 1927
- Died: 21 June 2004 (aged 77) Sydney, Australia
- Denomination: Catholic Church
- Occupation: Catholic bishop

John Edward Heaps (25 February 1927 – 21 June 2004) was an Australian bishop of the Catholic Church. He served for just over 10 years as auxiliary bishop of Sydney and became a controversial figure within the church following his retirement.

== Early life ==
Heaps was born in Hamilton, New South Wales to an Anglican father and a Catholic mother. He had two brothers and a sister. His father died when he was 12 years old. He left school when he was fourteen and worked at Consolidated Press before joining the AIF when he was 18. He served for two years before joining seminary to become a priest. His younger brother Alfred was also ordained as a priest in 1960 but died in a car accident less than five years after his ordination.

== Priesthood ==
Heaps studied at St Columba's College, Springwood and St Patrick's College, Manly. He was ordained a priest on 8 March 1958 at St Mary's Cathedral, Sydney by Cardinal Norman Thomas Gilroy.

Following ordination, he worked in the parishes of Harris Park, Waitara, Guildford and Woollahra. He became director of the Catholic Immigration Office in 1972 and was made a Member of the Most Excellent Order of the British Empire for his work in the resettlement of migrants. His younger brother Alfred was also ordained as a priest in 1960 but died in a car accident less than five years after his ordination.

== Episcopate ==
On 4 September 1981, Pope John Paul II appointed him an auxiliary bishop of Sydney and titular bishop of Inis Cathaig. He was ordained a bishop on 31 October 1981 at St Mary's Cathedral, Sydney by Cardinal James Darcy Freeman.

== Retirement and Death ==
Heaps retired from episcopal ministry on 12 March 1992 due to ill health and moved to live privately at Ramsgate, New South Wales.

In 1998, he published a book called "The Love That Dares to Question" which Cardinal Edward Clancy issued a warning over, saying while it wasn't "heretical", it was "ambiguous on a number of issues and runs the risk of misleading its readers". In the book, he advocated for priests who had married to return to ministry, and for remarried Catholics to be able to receive the sacraments

In retirement, he would often forego formal titles and simply introduce himself as "John Heaps" instead of "Bishop John Heaps".

He died on 21 June 2004.

Catholic Church titles
Preceded by —	Auxiliary Bishop of Sydney; 1981–1992	Succeeded by —
Preceded by William Hughes	Titular Bishop of Inis Cathaig; 1981–2004	Succeeded by Frank Caggiano
