= Archbishop Fisher =

Archbishop Fisher may refer to:

Anthony Fisher, born 1960, Roman Catholic Archbishop of Sydney

Geoffrey Fisher, 1887-1972, Archbishop of Canterbury
