= St Philip Howard Church, Kingston =

St. Philip Howard Church
- Location within Norfolk Island Location within Oceania
- 29°02′26″S 167°57′44″E
- Location: Kingston, Norfolk Island
- Country: Australia
- Denomination: Roman Catholic

History
- Founder: 1959
- Dedication: St Philip Howard
- Dedicated: by James Cardinal Freeman

Administration
- Archdiocese: Sydney

The Church of Saint Philip Howard is a parish of the Roman Catholic Church in Kingston, Norfolk Island, currently a mission of the Archdiocese of Sydney. The parish church is located on Queen Elizabeth Avenue and John Adams Road. The parish was established in 1959.

== History ==
The Catholic history of the island goes back to 1800, when the Irish convict priests Father James Harold and Father Peter O'Neil were sent there from Sydney. Father O'Neil conducted a school. Benedictine priest Father William Ullathorne visited the island on two separate occasions, and published the pamphlet "The Catholic Mission in Australasia" in 1838, exposing the poor conditions and unjust treatment of transported convicts there.

The parish was established in 1959, and for many years had a resident Marist priest who took care of the community's pastoral needs. Since the last Marist left in 1987, the Archdiocese has sent guest clerics to the island for stints of one or two weeks and celebrate Mass, perform baptisms, and handle similar duties. The church remains a mission of St Mary's Cathedral, Sydney. On weeks when no priest is on the island, the parish conducts a communion service. Only around 12% of the island is Catholic, with a smaller proportion of those people attending mass, thus congregation numbers continue to fall, sitting at around 20 people in 2015.

The church was rededicated to St Philip Howard on a visit of James Cardinal Freeman. Howard was an English nobleman canonised by Pope Paul VI in 1970 as one of the Forty Martyrs of England and Wales.

== See also ==
- Catholic Church in Australia
