= Kevin Manning (bishop) =

Australian Roman Catholic bishop (1933–2024)

The Most Reverend Kevin Manning
- Bishop of Parramatta
- Church: Roman Catholic Church
- Metropolis: Sydney
- Diocese: Parramatta
- Appointed: 10 July 1997
- Installed: 21 August 1997
- Retired: 8 January 2010
- Predecessor: Bede Vincent Heather
- Successor: Anthony Fisher
- Other posts: Bishop Emeritus (from 2010); Bishop of Armidale (1991–1997)

Orders
- Ordination: 20 December 1961
- Consecration: 10 July 1991

Personal details
- Born: Kevin Michael Manning; 2 November 1933 Coolah, New South Wales, Australia
- Died: 15 July 2024 (aged 90) Bathurst, New South Wales, Australia

Kevin Michael Manning (2 November 1933 – 15 July 2024) was an Australian Roman Catholic bishop. Having been a parish priest in the Roman Catholic Diocese of Bathurst, he served as Bishop of Armidale (1991–1997) and then as Bishop of Parramatta (1997–2010).

== Biography ==
Manning was born 1933 in Coolah, Warrumbungle Shire, New South Wales. In the era of depression years and the disruption of World War II, he attended Sacred Heart Primary School in Coolah.

After completing his studies at Propaganda Fide College in Rome, Manning was ordained as a Catholic priest by Gregorio Pietro Agagianian on 20 December 1961. In the first half of the 19th century Propaganda Fide College had as its spiritual director St Vincent Pallotti and its students included at different times Saints Oliver Plunkett and John Henry Newman and also later Sydney's Cardinal Sir Norman Thomas Gilroy and Cardinal Patrick Francis Moran. Reverend Kevin Manning started his ecclesiastical career as a parish priest in the Diocese of Bathurst.

In 1983, the Canberra Times reported a novel way to celebrate an engagement to be married. A church service and engagement rings blessing was led by Manning at Marymead Chapel Narrabundah ACT.

The young Manning was, for a time, based in Canberra and celebrated his 25th anniversary as a clergyman in 1987. He was interviewed by the Canberra Times for the occasion.

After 13 years of service, from 1978, as assistant secretary and secretary to the Australian Catholic Bishops Conference, the Apostolic Pronuncio announced Manning's appointment as Bishop of Armidale. One collaborative agency of social justice, that evolved during these years and continues to this day was the Paulian Association's initiative of Palms Australia. Another is Project Compassion.

On 10 July 1997, Most Reverend Manning was installed as Bishop of Parramatta by Edward Clancy, the then Archbishop of Sydney. He was consecrated as a Bishop at Armidale on 10 July 1991 and served as the eighth Bishop of Armidale from 1991 to 1997. He served as Bishop of Parramatta from 1997 to 2010, and held the title Bishop Emeritus.

The current St Patrick's Cathedral was consecrated under his watch in November 2003.

Campion College at Toongabbie, was opened under his watch in 2006. That year, he received the Kahlil Gibran International Award.

Manning was interviewed by the ABC Sunday Nights Second Hour program in August 2007.

Manning died in Bathurst on 15 July 2024, at the age of 90. His funeral is scheduled to take place at St Patrick's Cathedral, Parramatta, on 2 August.

Catholic Church titles
Preceded by Bede Vincent Heather	Bishop of Parramatta; 1997–2010	Succeeded by Anthony Fisher
Preceded by Henry Joseph Kennedy	Bishop of Armidale; 1991–1997	Succeeded by Luc Julian Matthys
