= Seminary of the Good Shepherd =

- Location: Homebush, New South Wales, Australia
- Coordinates: 33°52′07″S 151°04′54″E
- Founder: Edward Clancy
- Established: 1996
- Gender: Male only
- Rector: Michael de Stoop
- Undergraduates: circa 50
- Website: sgs.org.au

The Seminary of the Good Shepherd is the seminary of the Roman Catholic Archdiocese of Sydney and of a number of dioceses in the province of New South Wales and beyond, including the Diocese of Broken Bay, Archdiocese of Canberra and Goulburn, Diocese of Wollongong, Diocese of Maitland-Newcastle and Diocese of Bathurst. The seminary is principally administered by the Archdiocese of Sydney.

== History ==
The first seminary in Sydney was St Patrick's College, Manly, which began in 1889 with a class of twelve students, however, the first efforts at training priests in Sydney can be traced back to the 1830s under Archbishop John Bede Polding. In 1991, due to a declining number of seminarians and a desire to separate the overall seminary formation and the academic formation, consideration was given to finding a new seminary and theological faculty.

In 1993, the Church announced that the seminary would be vacating the St Patrick's estate site in 1995. At the beginning of the academic year 1996 the Seminary of the Good Shepherd opened at Abbotsford Road, Homebush, and the Catholic Institute of Sydney, located on Albert Road, Strathfield came into being shortly after.

== Educational scope ==
The Seminary of the Good Shepherd prepares men for the priesthood, focusing on human, spiritual, pastoral and academic formation. The formation programs runs for seven years.

The seminary students receive their academic formation through the neighbouring Catholic Institute of Sydney, where they study alongside lay students.

== Former colleges ==
- St Patrick's Seminary, Manly, New South Wales (built 1889, ceased operating in 1995) now the International College of Management, Sydney
- St Columba's College, Springwood, New South Wales (built 1910, closed 1977), Minor Seminary

== Current and former students ==
- Shayne D'Cunha, former professional footballer and Australia under 20's player, Seminarian for Diocese of Broken Bay

== Former staff ==
- Danny Meagher, now Auxiliary Bishop of Sydney, Seminary Rector from 2015 to 2020

== See also ==
- Roman Catholic Church in Australia
