= Henry Kennedy (bishop) =

Australian Catholic bishop (1915–2003

The Most Reverend Henry Kennedy
- Bishop Emeritus of Diocese of Armidale
- Diocese: Armidale
- Installed: 6 December 1971
- Term ended: 26 April 1991
- Predecessor: James Darcy Freeman
- Successor: Kevin Manning
- Other posts: Auxiliary Bishop of Brisbane (1967–1971); Titular Bishop of Simingi (1967–1971)

Orders
- Ordination: 30 November 1938 at St Mary's Cathedral, Sydney by Norman Thomas Gilroy
- Consecration: 23 November 1967 by Norman Thomas Gilroy

Personal details
- Born: Henry Joseph Kennedy; 18 February 1915 Balmain, New South Wales, Australia
- Died: 2 September 2003 (aged 88) Tamworth, New South Wales, Australia
- Denomination: Catholic Church
- Occupation: Catholic bishop

Henry Joseph Kennedy (18 February 1915 – 2 September 2003) was an Australian bishop of the Catholic Church. He served as the first Auxiliary Bishop of Brisbane and later, Bishop of Armidale.

== Early life ==
Kennedy was born in Balmain to Peter and Catherine Kennedy.

== Priesthood ==
Kennedy was ordained to the priesthood on 30 November 1938 at St Mary's Cathedral, Sydney by Archbishop Norman Thomas Gilroy for the Archdiocese of Sydney.

One of his first appointments saw him appointed to St Joseph's Church in the Archdiocese of Hobart, on loan from the Archdiocese of Sydney. He then served as secretary to Archbishop Norman Thomas Gilroy for 19 years, from 1948 to 1967. Prior to the elevation to the episcopate, he was parish priest of Campsie.

== Episcopate ==
=== Auxiliary Bishop of Brisbane ===
On 14 September 1967, Kennedy was appointed as the first Auxiliary Bishop of Brisbane. He was ordained on 23 November 1967 by Cardinal Norman Thomas Gilroy, who had also ordained him as a priest 19 years earlier. He became the first Australian-born to hold episcopal office in Brisbane.

=== Bishop of Armidale ===
On 6 December 1971, Kennedy was appointed Bishop of Armidale, succeeding James Darcy Freeman who was appointed Archbishop of Sydney.

As Bishop of Armidale, he was instrumental in establishing the priest's retiring units at Nazareth House in Tamworth and the units for retired persons at 'Coleman Court' in Armidale. He was also a great supporter of the Indigenous population of the Diocese too.

== Retirement and Death ==
He died in Nazareth House, Tamworth on 3 September 2003 at the age of 88. He was buried at Saints Mary and Joseph Catholic Cathedral, Armidale.

== Controversy ==
Following his death, Kennedy was found to have shown "deficient" judgement while Bishop of Armidale, in dealing with former priest John Joseph Farrell, who was accused of abusing children during the 1980s, in a report commissioned by the Catholic Church. The report said Kennedy knew about concerns with the priest but ‘‘sat on his hands and did nothing’’. The report also said Kennedy had been aware of concerns about "defects" in Farrell's personality and character during his seminary studies but appeared "to have had an unbending and inexplicable determination to make [him] a priest".

Catholic Church titles
Preceded by James Darcy Freeman	Bishop of Armidale; 1943–1955	Succeeded by Kevin Manning
Preceded by –	Auxiliary Bishop of Brisbane; 1967–1971	Succeeded by –
Preceded by –	Titular Archbishop of Simingi; 1967–1971	Succeeded by Odorico Leovigildo Saiz Pérez
