= Pat Power =

Australian Catholic bishop (1942–2025)

The Most Reverend Pat Power
- Auxiliary Bishop Emeritus of Canberra and Goulburn
- Archdiocese: Canberra and Goulburn
- Installed: 8 March 1986
- Term ended: 7 June 2012
- Other post: Titular Bishop of Oreto (1986–2025)

Orders
- Ordination: 17 July 1965 (priest) at St Gregory's Church, Queanbeyan by Eris O'Brien
- Consecration: 8 March 1986 (bishop) at St Christopher's Cathedral, Canberra by Francis Carroll, Edward Clancy, John Aloysius Morgan

Personal details
- Born: Patrick Percival Power; 11 February 1942 Cooma, New South Wales, Australia
- Died: 15 September 2025 (aged 83) Canberra, Australia
- Denomination: Catholic Church
- Occupation: Catholic bishop
- Education: St Patrick's College, Manly; Pontifical Urbaniana University

Patrick Percival Power (11 February 1942 – 15 September 2025) was an Australian bishop of the Catholic Church.

== Early life ==
Power grew up in Queanbeyan, the brother of Maria (deceased), Margaret, Loretta and Pauline. He was educated at St Christopher's School and St Edmund's College in Canberra and completed his schooling at Chevalier College, Bowral. After leaving school, he trained for the priesthood at St Columba's College in Springwood and St Patrick's College, Manly.

Power was ordained to the priesthood in Queanbeyan on 17 July 1965 and served in the parishes of Braidwood, Canberra and Goulburn before being asked by Archbishop Thomas Cahill to undertake a doctorate in canon law in 1972 at the Propaganda Fide College, Rome. On the completion of his studies in 1975, Power returned to Canberra and for 10 years served as archbishop's secretary (to three archbishops) and director of the marriage tribunal.

In February 1985, Power became parish priest of his home parish of Queanbeyan.

== Episcopate ==
On 18 April 1986, Power was ordained to the episcopate by Archbishop Francis Carroll at St Christopher's Cathedral, Canberra, becoming the fifth auxiliary bishop of the Archdiocese of Canberra and Goulburn.

Power served on bishops' committees for laity, ecumenism, canon law, family and life, social welfare and media. He was also the Secretary of the Committee for Justice, Development, Ecology and Peace and a member of the Australian Social Justice Council.

Much of Power's ministry was in the field of ecumenical and inter-faith relations. He was the first Catholic co-chairman of AUSTARC, the national Anglican-Roman Catholic dialogue. He served a number of terms as chair of the ACT Churches Council.

At the 1998 Oceania synod of bishops in Rome, Power spoke on marginalised people in society and in the church. Much of his efforts were directed in this area through Catholic Welfare Australia and local community organisations in Canberra. He was a strong advocate for the East Timorese, Palestinians and Indigenous Australians and also for racial respect, the unemployed and opposition to abortion and assisted suicide.

In 2000, Power chaired a major enquiry into poverty in the Australian Capital Territory. He supported the move to have the South Sydney Rabbitohs restored to the national rugby league competition.

Power said that the church had "retreated from the promising outcomes" of the Second Vatican Council. In a 2010 article, he said that issues such as priestly celibacy, church teaching on sexuality and the role of women in the church must be discussed with Catholic lay people. He often expressed support for the ordination of married men.

== Resignation and death ==
His early resignation, at age 70, as auxiliary bishop of Canberra and Goulburn was effective from 7 June 2012. He stated that the Vatican's "inability to listen" and the problems of clergy sex abuse and the shortage of priests are the "most vexing issues" facing the church. He died on 15 September 2025 at the age of 83.

Catholic Church titles
Preceded by —	Auxiliary Bishop of Canberra and Goulburn; 1986–2012	Succeeded by —
Preceded by Angel Lagdameo	Titular Bishop of Oreto; 1986–2025	Succeeded by Vacant
