= Geoffrey Robinson (bishop) =

Australian Catholic bishop (1937–2020)

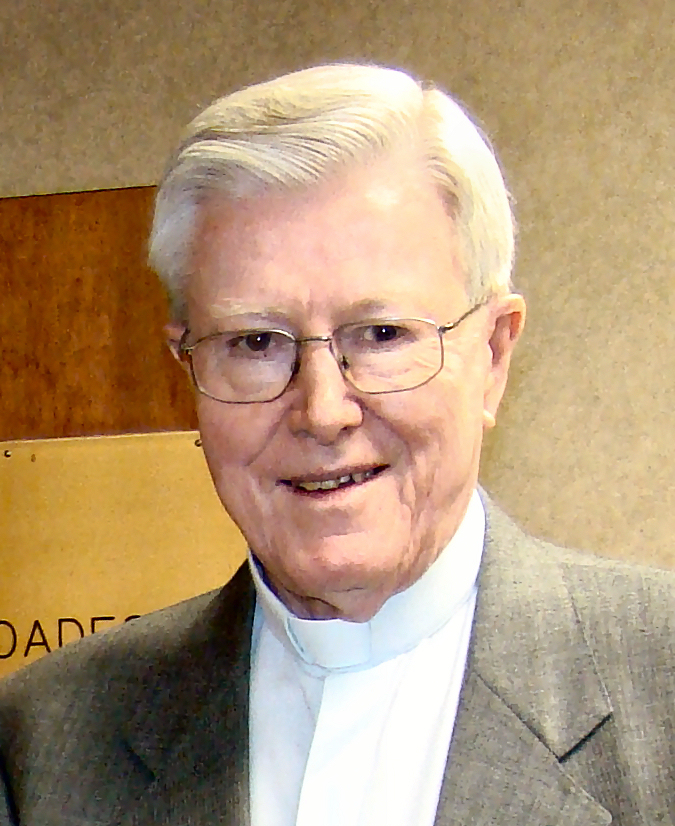
Robinson at Temple University

Geoffrey James Robinson (10 August 1937 – 29 December 2020) was an Australian Catholic bishop.

== Life and career ==
Robinson was ordained for the Roman Catholic Archdiocese of Sydney in 1960. He earned advanced degrees in philosophy, theology and canon law, first in Australia and subsequently in Rome. From 1967 until 1983, after a few years as a parish priest, he taught canon law at the Catholic Institute of Sydney. In addition to serving as chief justice of the archdiocesan marriage tribunal, he was secretary and then president of the Canon Law Society of Australia and New Zealand.

For many years Robinson served as the chairman of the Sydney Archdiocesan Catholic Schools Board and the Australian Catholic Education Commission for New South Wales. Finally, he worked extensively in the areas of ecumenism and professional standards in ministry. In 1984, he was named an auxiliary bishop of Sydney, combining administrative work with his tribunal and other duties.

In May 2002, Robinson called on Pope John Paul II to commission a church-wide study of clerical sex abuse.

Robinson retired in July 2004 with health issues. He died from cancer on 29 December 2020.

== Retirement ==
According to Pat Power, then Auxiliary Bishop of Canberra and Goulburn, addressing Catholic Social Services of Australia in September 2007,

Bishop Robinson's newly published book, Confronting Power and Sex in the Catholic Church is a brave exposition of what the author judges to be some of the root causes of abuse. He sees this crisis as an opportunity for the whole Church to 'read the signs of the times' in thoroughly re-examining whole areas of its life which are in need of reform.

He pleads for open and honest discussion, painful though it might be. Ultimately, he recognises that it is the truth which sets us free. In no area of Church life should we back away from the hard questions. At this point in the history of Catholic Social Services Australia we are at a 'kairos' moment, a time of challenge and risk but also of great hope and opportunity. Bishop Robinson would be telling his old colleagues to face up to this moment with courage and confidence and in a spirit of dialogue and mutual trust.

On 6 May 2008, however, 10 days before Robinson's scheduled public lecture at Temple University in Philadelphia—the first event in a month-long speaking tour in the United States and Canada—the Australian Catholic Bishops Conference issued a statement critical of aspects of Robinson's book, noting:

We are deeply indebted to him for his years of effort to bring help and healing to those who have suffered sexual abuse and for what he has done to establish protocols of professional standards for Church personnel in this area. . . . The book's questioning of the authority of the Church is connected to Bishop Robinson's uncertainty about the knowledge and authority of Christ himself. Catholics believe that the Church, founded by Christ, is endowed by him with a teaching office which endures through time. This is why the Church's Magisterium teaches the truth authoritatively in the name of Christ. The book casts doubt upon these teachings.

This leads in turn to the questioning of Catholic teaching on, among other things, the nature of Tradition, the inspiration of the Holy Scripture, the infallibility of the Councils and the Pope, the authority of the Creeds, the nature of the ministerial priesthood and central elements of the Church's moral teaching.

Robinson replied to the bishops in his "Reflections on US Tour and Response to the Australian Bishops' Conference Statement".

In March 2012, Robinson visited the United States again. On 15 March he was a plenary speaker and retreat presenter for the Seventh National Symposium on Catholicism & Homosexuality (15–17 March 2012, Baltimore, Maryland), organised by New Ways Ministry. He was invited to be the keynote speaker at the tenth annual VOTF Bridgeport conference on 24 March 2012 at Fairfield University, lecturing on "Reclaiming the Spirit of Jesus".

On 4 June 2013, together with Bishop Bill Morris and Bishop Pat Power, Robinson officially launched a worldwide petition drive calling for an ecumenical council inclusive of the laity to put God's house in order. The petition, addressed to Pope Francis, says:

We, the undersigned members of the Catholic Church, have been sickened by the continuing stories of sexual abuse within our Church, and we are appalled by the accounts of an unchristian response to those who have suffered. When so many people either offend or respond poorly, we cannot limit ourselves to blaming individuals, but must also look at systemic causes. The situation is so grave that we call for an Ecumenical Council to respond to the one question of doing everything possible to uproot such abuse from the Church and produce a better response to victims. An essential part of this call is that the laity of the whole world should have a major voice in the Council (for it is our children who have been abused or put at risk), and that the following subjects be included:

1. The continuing influence of the idea of an angry God
2. The immaturity that arises from passive obedience in adults
3. The teaching of the Church on sexual morality
4. The part played in abuse by celibacy, especially obligatory celibacy
5. The lack of a strong feminine influence in every aspect of the Church
6. The idea that through ordination the priest is taken above other people (clericalism)
7. The lack of professionalism in the life of priests and religious
8. The unhealthy situations in which many priests and religious are required to live
9. The constant placing of right beliefs before right actions
10. The passion for secrecy and the hiding of faults within the Church, especially in the Vatican
11. The ways in which the protection of papal authority has been put before the eradication of sexual abuse
12. The provision of structures to make a reality of the 'sense of faith' (sensus fidei) of all Catholic people
13. The need for each Conference of Bishops to have the authority to compel individual bishops to follow common decisions in this matter.

== Books ==
- Marriage, Divorce and Nullity - A Guide to the Annulment Process in the Catholic Church. Melbourne: Collins Dove, 1984
- A Change of Mind and Heart : the Good News According to Mark. Revesby, N.S.W.: Parish Ministry Publications, 1994.
- Travels in Sacred Places. North Blackburn, Vic.: HarperCollins Religious, 1997.
- Confronting Power and Sex in the Catholic Church: Reclaiming the Spirit of Jesus. Mulgrave, Vic. 2007. (U.S. edition: foreword by Donald B. Cozzens, Collegeville, Minnesota, : Liturgical Press, 2008.)
- Love’s Urgent Longings, Wrestling with Belief in Today’s Church. Garratt Publishing, Melbourne, 2010.
- The Gospel of Luke: For Meditation and Homilies. Garratt Publishing, Melbourne, 2012.
- For Christ's Sake End Sexual Abuse in the Catholic Church for Good. Garratt Publishing, Melbourne, 2013.
- Towards the End of My Days: Theological and Spiritual Reflections. Melbourne: Garratt Publishing, 2022.
