= Wollemi College =

Location
- Werrington, New South Wales; Australia; 33°45′53″S 150°45′20″E

Information
- Type: Independent
- Motto: Latin: Duc in Altum (Cast out into the deep)
- Denomination: Roman Catholic
- Established: 23 February 1999; 27 years ago
- Founder: The PARED Foundation
- Status: Open
- Oversight: Parents for Education Foundation
- Principal: James Ramos
- Chaplain: Felix Navarro, Anthony Khoudair and Alan Layt
- Staff: 29
- Teaching staff: 24
- Years: Year 2 to 12
- Gender: Boys
- Enrolment: 500 (2017)
- Campus size: 10 hectares (25 acres)
- Campus type: Suburban
- Houses: Araluen , Echuca , Mundoora , Wyuna
- Colours: Blue, white and green
- Athletics conference: Hills Zone Sports Association
- Feeder schools: Montgrove College
- Affiliation: Independent Primary School Heads Association of Australia
- Website: wollemi.nsw.edu.au

Wollemi College is an independent Roman Catholic school for boys, located in the western Sydney suburb of Werrington, New South Wales, Australia. Situated on 10 hectares (25 acres), the college was founded in 1999 and provides a personalised education for students from Year 3 to Year 12. Oversight of the college is administered by Parents for Education Foundation (PARED), which is affiliated with Opus Dei.

== Overview ==
The school grew out of Orchard Hills Kindergarten School, which was founded in 2000 by a group of parents and teachers, the PARED Foundation. The Orchard Hills Preparatory School has developed into Montgrove College for girls with boys in the infant years. Wollemi College began operating as a school for boys in 2004. Montgrove College in Orchard Hills is the sister school of Wollemi College and the cousin school of Redfield College and Tangara College. Wollemi College states that its aim is "to follow the principle that parents are the primary educators of their children and that schools exist to give parents every support".

== Enrolment ==
Tuition fees	Full Fee Per Term (annual)
Primary (years 3–6)	$2,075.00
Junior Secondary (years 7–10)	$3,510.00
Senior Secondary (years 11 & 12)	$3,510.00

Sibling Concessions	
Second child	10% concession
Third child	25% concession
Further concessions for additional children enrolled.

== Religious education ==
Religious education is grounded in the teachings of the Catholic faith. Students are encouraged to practice their faith with freedom and conviction. The chaplain of the school is a priest of Opus Dei, a personal prelature of the Catholic Church. However, students of other faiths are welcome.

== Computer facilities ==
Computing studies are incorporated into teaching programs across the disciplines. Student use of computer labs, advanced workstations, and iPads, moves from basic keyboard skills and research through to internet, communications, word processing, database, and music applications to programming, CAD, and web design.

== Extracurricular activities ==
Co-curricular activities for all students include the Character education Program, fencing, bowling, polo, stream watching, preventative of ISDA debating and public speaking (in the CSSA competitions), study skills workshops, leadership education, class camps, visits by guest speakers and media workshops. Optional activities include father and son camps, chess club and choir.

== Sports ==
Principal sports include rugby, cricket, soccer, basketball, swimming and athletics. The school is a member of the HZSA (Hills Zone Sports Association), AICES and IPSHAA (Independent Primary School Heads Association of Australia). Students also play club competitions with the Wollemi Soccer Club and the Wollemi Wizards in basketball.

== See also ==
- List of Catholic schools in New South Wales
- Catholic education in Australia
