= Samuel John Augustine Sheehy =

Irish-Australian Benedictine priest

The Reverend Samuel John Augustine Sheehy
- Administrator of Armidale

Orders
- Ordination: 6 March 1852 by Charles Henry Davis

Personal details
- Born: 1 October 1827 Cork, Diocese of Cork, Ireland
- Died: 14 September 1910 (aged 82) Randwick, Sydney, Australia

Samuel John Austin Sheehy OSB (1 October 1827 – 14 September 1910) was a Benedictine priest who was appointed auxiliary bishop of Sydney in 1866 but never took up the appointment.

== Early life ==
Sheehy was born in Cork, County Cork, the son of a John and Harriett Sheehy. His father was a carpenter. He came to Sydney as a migrant with his parents on 19 October 1838 aboard Magistrate. At the time, there were only two priests in New South Wales. He studied at St Mary's Seminary in Sydney and entered the priory attached to St Mary's Cathedral in 1845.

== Priesthood ==
Sheehy received the Benedictine habit on 2 August 1849 and made his religious profession on 5 May 1851. He was ordained a priest on 6 March 1852 by Bishop Charles Henry Davis at St Mary's Cathedral, Sydney.

Following his ordination, he was put in charge of St Mary's Seminary day school. In 1858, he became chaplain for Darlinghurst and Cockatoo Island gaols and in 1861 president of Lyndhurst College and vicar-general of the Archdiocese of Sydney. He was made parish priest of Darlinghurst in 1864.

When the Diocese of Armidale was erected on 28 November 1862, Sheehy was made administrator of the Diocese until a permanent bishop could be appointed.

=== Auxiliary Bishop Appointment ===
On 23 November 1866, Sheehy was appointed auxiliary bishop of Sydney and expected to succeed Archbishop John Bede Polding. Following the appointment though, Cardinal Alessandro Barnabò, the prefect of Propaganda College, asked Polding to delay the consecration until Sheehy had been cleared of charges of negligence, including allegations he had been seen drunk. Sheehy resigned as bishop before the matter could be resolved and Polding believed the allegations had been an attempt to prevent Sheehy from succeeding him. Contemporary reports suggested he had "modestly declined the offer".

Sheehy remained vicar general until 1873 when he was appointed to Windsor. He then moved to Wollongong in 1885, Ryde in 1888 and Waverley in 1907.

== Death ==
Sheehy died of senile decay in Randwick on 14 September 1910. An obituary said he was "universally revered and respected".
