= Patrick Murphy (bishop) =

Australian Roman Catholic bishop (1920–2007)

The Most Reverend Patrick Laurence Murphy
- Bishop of Broken Bay
- Church: Catholic Church
- Diocese: Diocese of Broken Bay
- In office: 8 April 1986 – 9 July 1996
- Predecessor: Diocese erected
- Successor: David Walker
- Previous posts: Titular Bishop of Aquae in Numidia (1976-1986); Auxiliary Bishop of Sydney (1976-1986)

Orders
- Ordination: 22 July 1944 by Norman Gilroy
- Consecration: 22 January 1977 by James Darcy Freeman

Personal details
- Born: 28 October 1920 Eastwood, New South Wales, Australia, British Empire
- Died: 18 March 2007 (aged 86)

Patrick Laurence Murphy (28 October 1920 – 18 March 2007) was an Australian Roman Catholic Bishop who served as the first bishop of the Roman Catholic Diocese of Broken Bay in northern Sydney when it became distinct from the Archdiocese of Sydney in 1986.

== Early life ==
Patrick Laurence Murphy was born to Catherine Imelda (née Deloughery) and Timothy Francis Murphy on 28 October 1920 in the Sydney suburb of Eastwood, and attended the Convent Primary school in Eastwood before completing his secondary education at Christian Brother's College, Strathfield.

== Priesthood ==
After completing his secondary education, Patrick Murphy joined the Seminary of Saint Columba in the Blue Mountains suburb of Springwood before transferring to the Seminary of Saint Patrick in the Sydney suburb of Manly. He was ordained as a priest of the Archdiocese of Sydney by the then-Archbishop of Sydney Norman Gilroy on 22 July 1944 at the age of twenty-three.

== Episcopate ==
Father Murphy was chosen on 20 December 1976 to be an Auxiliary Bishop of the Archdiocese of Sydney, and subsequently received his episcopal orders on 22 January 1977 by James Cardinal Freeman, at the time Archbishop of Sydney. He served in this position until on 14 April 1986 he was announced as the first bishop of the to-be-established Diocese of Broken Bay and his enthronement as such on 28 May of the same year.

== Retirement and death ==
Under the mandatory retirement of bishops at the age of seventy-five, Bishop Murphy retired on 9 July 1996. He died on Laetare Sunday, 18 March 2007 at the age of 86.
