= Redfield College (New South Wales) =

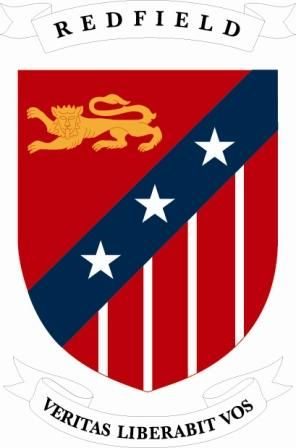
- Redfield College Shield

Location
- Dural, Hills District, Sydney, New South Wales; Australia; 33°41′21″S 151°01′57″E

Information
- Type: Independent all-boys early learning, primary, and secondary day school
- Motto: Latin: Veritas liberabit vos (The truth will set you free)
- Religious affiliation: Roman Catholic Archdiocese of Sydney
- Denomination: Roman Catholic
- Established: 1986; 40 years ago
- Educational authority: New South Wales Department of Education
- Oversight: PARED Foundation
- Headmaster: Matthew Aldous
- Grades: Early learning and K–12
- Gender: Boys
- Campus type: Outer-urban
- Colours: Red, white and navy blue
- Website: www.redfield.nsw.edu.au

Redfield College is an independent Roman Catholic all-boys early learning, primary, and secondary day school, located in Dural, a suburb in the Hills District of Sydney, New South Wales, Australia.

The college was founded in 1986 by the Parents for Education Foundation and provides an education for students from early learning, through Year 2 to Year 12.

== Mentoring ==
Each student is allocated a personal mentor, formerly known as a "tutor" within the school, who meets the student regularly (ideally fortnightly) to check on the student's advancement academically, socially, spiritually, etc. The mentor tends to guide the same student over a period of years, and meets with the parents of the student each term. This system is the same across all the Schools of The PARED Foundation.

== Chaplaincy ==
College is an independent school. The Chaplains at the college are priests of Opus Dei, a personal prelature of the Catholic Church. Redfield offers daily mass and the Sacrament of Reconciliation to students, parents and teachers as well as other faith-based practises of the Catholic Church. The current chaplains at the college are Fr Phil Elias (Class of 2000) and Fr Frank Garcia.

As of 2023, there have been 11 Redfield Old Boys ordained to the priesthood, including Diocesan, Franciscan, Dominican and Opus Dei priests.

== HSC performance ==
Although founded in 1986, Redfield's first HSC class was the Class of 1993. Since then Redfield has undertaken the HSC every year and 2022 marked its 30th HSC cohort. Although the school has a relatively small cohort compared to other schools in NSW, the College has consistently ranked within the top 150 schools for the last 20 years. In 2023, the NSW ranking for Redfield College is #43 with HSC results

== Programmes available ==
=== Community service ===
Throughout their schooling lives, Redfield students complete many Community Service Projects, both locally and abroad. In Year 9, boys do a small project that they complete weekly over a year. These include visiting disabled students, nursing homes, and community gardening. At the end of Year 10, students attend a five-day camp, known as "Work Camp", wherein they travel to the Riverina town of Darlington Point to work on farms and in the homes of elderly couples.

=== Exchange programs ===
Redfield has frequently hosted visits from, and sent students to, Mikawadai College in Nagasaki, Japan, and three schools in Spain: Colegio Viaro in Barcelona, Colegio Gaztelueta in Bilbao and Colegio Los Robles in Oviedo. In recent years boys from Monte VI in Montevideo, Uruguay and Colegio Penalba in Valladolid have also visited each year as well as a class of students from Tak Sun College in Hong Kong. Boys are billeted with families.

=== Sport ===
Redfield's principal sports include football, rugby union, basketball and cricket. Redfield's sporting division is affiliated with the IPSHA (Independent Primary School Heads of Australia), ISA (Independent Sporting Association), and CIS (Combined Independent Schools). Redfield's senior Rugby team (the 1st VX) has won the ISA second division championship six times since joining the ISA in 2006, more than any other school in the Independent Schools Association.

The Redfield First XI won the Second Division Football Championship in its inaugural year in 2012, and won the 2014 and 2015 seasons comprehensively. More recently they won the 2016 and 2017 season.

=== Co-curricular ===
Redfield offers the following co-curricular activities:

- Junior Voices
- Primary Choir
- Vocal Ensemble
- Schola Cantorum (Gregorian choir)
- Concert Band
- Wind Symphony
- Debating
- Public speaking
- Mock trials
- Athletics
- Swimming
- Cross Country
- Chess Club
- ISA Cricket
- ISA Basketball
- ISA Football
- ISA Rugby
- Intramural Chess
- Intramural Basketball
- Intramural Football
- Intramural Cricket
- Intramural Touch Football

== Headmasters ==
The following individuals have served as Headmaster of Redfield College.

Ordinal	Headmaster	Term start	Term end	Time in office	Notes
1	Frank Monagle	1986	1995	8–9 years	
2	Andrew Mullins	1996	2010	13–14 years	
3	James Burfitt	2011	2016	4–5 years	
4	George Cavanna	2017	2019	8–9 years	
4	Expo Mejia	2019	2021	1–2 years	
5	Matthew Aldous	2021	incumbent	2–3 years	

== Notable alumni ==
The Redfield Old Boys' Association (ROBA) is a network/community of alumni. It has strong rugby union, football and basketball teams.

Notable alumni include:

- Nic Dolly, rugby union player
- Bernard Foley, rugby union player
- Lenny Hayes, former Australian rules footballer
- Julian Maroun, actor
- Lachlan McCaffrey, rugby union player
- Dominic Perrottet, 46th Premier of New South Wales
- Tim Pocock, actor
- Nathaniel Smith, former Member for Wollondilly

== Four Corners investigation ==
In January 2023, the ABC program Four Corners investigated Sydney schools associated with Opus Dei (including Redfield), and alleged harmful classroom practices including: "...misinformation about sexual health, homophobia, opposition to consent education and encouraging girls to not get the HPV vaccine...″ and ″...opposing consent education, encouraging students to make decisions contrary to medical advice, harm to students as a result of their education, homophobia and recruitment of students under the guise of pastoral care..."

== See also ==
- List of non-government schools in New South Wales
- List of Catholic schools in New South Wales
- Catholic education in Australia
