= Terence Brady (bishop) =

Australian Catholic bishop (born 1947)

The Most Reverend Terence Brady
- Auxiliary Bishop Emeritus of Sydney

Orders
- Ordination: 20 August 1983 by Edward Clancy
- Consecration: 16 November 2007 by George Pell

Personal details
- Born: Terence John Gerard Brady; 19 April 1947 (age 79) Darlinghurst, New South Wales, Australia
- Denomination: Roman Catholicism

Terence John Gerard Brady (born 19 April 1947) is a former Auxiliary Bishop of the Roman Catholic Archdiocese of Sydney. He served in this position from 2007 to 2022.

== Early life and education ==
Brady was born on 19 April 1947 in Darlinghurst and was baptised in the parish church of St Mary Magdalene. He grew up in Rose Bay, and his family later moved and became regular parishioners at St Joseph's, Oatley. His father, Bernard, was a builder. Brady's mother Mary and his younger sister Frances were present at St Mary's Cathedral when he was ordained an auxiliary bishop for the Archdiocese of Sydney on 16 November 2007.

After attending St Declan's Penshurst, Brady undertook secondary schooling at De La Salle Cronulla. A short time in the workforce preceded eight years as a religious brother with the Missionaries of the Sacred Heart. Brady then worked as a social worker with South Sydney Council before commencing his studies for the priesthood at St Patrick's College, Manly. He was ordained a priest for the Archdiocese of Sydney on 20 August 1983 by Archbishop (later Cardinal) Edward Clancy.

== Career ==
Brady served as an assistant priest in the parishes of Liverpool, Strathfield and finally Kingsgrove, where he was appointed parish priest in 1993. Since January 2004 he has been parish priest of Sydney Harbour North, comprising the partnered parishes of Clifton Gardens, Mosman and Neutral Bay.

Brady has maintained a strong commitment to social justice through a long connection with the St Vincent de Paul Society, especially serving the homeless through the Matthew Talbot Hostel, and for the last seven years as the Director of Catholic Mission for the Archdiocese.

As an auxiliary bishop Brady has been assigned the titular episcopal see of Talattula, an ancient North African diocese in what is now Tunisia.

In May 2012, the Australian Catholic Bishops Conference elected Brady to chair the restructured Bishops Commission for Pastoral Life which will be responsible for defending the rights of migrants and refugees, the pastoral care of prisoners, prison chaplains and people with disabilities.

Pope Francis accepted his resignation on 10 October 2022.

== Personal life ==
Brady's main recreation is swimming and he also enjoys music (especially Celtic).
