= Bede Vincent Heather =

Australian priest (1928–2021)

- Bishop of Parramatta
- Church: Catholic Church
- Diocese: Diocese of Parramatta
- In office: 8 April 1986 – 10 July 1997
- Predecessor: Diocese erected
- Successor: Kevin Manning
- Previous posts: Titular Bishop of Obbi (1979-1986); Auxiliary Bishop of Sydney (1979-1986)

Orders
- Ordination: 15 July 1951 at Rome by Pietro Fumasoni Biondi
- Consecration: 4 August 1979 at St Mary's Cathedral, Sydney by James Darcy Freeman

Personal details
- Born: 7 December 1928 Strathfield, New South Wales, Australia, British Empire
- Died: 25 February 2021 (aged 92) Croydon, New South Wales, Australia

Bede Vincent Heather (7 December 1928 – 25 February 2021) was an Australian Roman Catholic bishop. He served as the first Bishop of Parramatta.

== Early life ==
Heather was born on 7 December 1928, the third child and younger son of William Joseph and Alice Grace Heather of Strathfield. He was educated at St Patrick's College, Strathfield and entered St Columba's College, Springwood in 1942. In 1947, he was sent to Rome to continue his studies at the Pontificio Collegio Urbano de Propaganda Fide where he was among 30 Australian and New Zealand students studying for the priesthood.

== Priesthood ==
On 15 July 1951, he was ordained a priest for the Archdiocese of Sydney in Castel Gandolfo by Cardinal Pietro Fumasoni Biondi. His mother travelled to Rome for his ordination. Following his ordination, he remained in Rome to continue a course in Sacred Scripture.

In 1953, Heather returned to Sydney after completing his Licentiate in Sacred Scripture at the Pontifical Biblical Institute. His first appointment was as assistant priest at Brighton-Le-Sands. He was then appointed to Willoughby where he also served as assistant priest.

He also began teaching biblical languages and literature at St Columba’s Seminary, Springwood, and at St Patrick’s Seminary, Manly. In 1973, he travelled to Africa where he taught at the Bigard Memorial Seminary, Nigeria until 1976. He returned to Sydney and was appointed administrator of The Entrance, then St Ives, before taking up an appointment at Mount Druitt.

== Episcopate ==
On 30 July 1979, Heather was appointed Auxiliary Bishop of Sydney and Titular Bishop of Obbi by Pope John Paul II.

On 8 April 1986, the Diocese of Parramatta was erected and Heather was announced as its first bishop.

He was formally installed at Parramatta's first bishop on 18 May 1986 at St Patrick's Cathedral, Parramatta. As bishop, he helped to shape the Diocese of Parramatta in its early years. He also became widely known for being among the people, even those without a professed faith.

Heather was bishop of the Diocese when, in 1996, St Patrick's Cathedral, Parramatta was destroyed by fire following an arson attack. He committed to rebuilding a new cathedral although he resigned before the building could begin.

== Retirement and Death ==
Heather retired as Bishop of Parramatta on 10 July 1997, seven years prior to the mandated retirement age of 75. He spent his retirement on the Central Coast of New South Wales.

In 2016, Heather fronted the Royal Commission into Institutional Responses to Child Sexual Abuse where he admitted to destroying documents related to potential legal action against a paedophile priest.

Heather died at the St Ezekiel Moreno Nursing Home in Croydon on 25 February 2021. His funeral took place on 4 March 2021 at St Patrick's Cathedral, Parramatta.

== Notes ==
Catholic Church titles
| Preceded by | Bishop of Parramatta; 1986–1997 | Succeeded by Kevin Michael Manning |
