= Mossel =

Mossel is a surname. Notable people with the surname include:

- Elchanan Mossel, professor of mathematics at the Massachusetts Institute of Technology
- Hans Mossel (1905–1944), Dutch clarinettist and saxophonist
- Jacob Mossel (1704–1761), Governor-General of the Dutch East Indies from 1750 to 1761

== See also ==
- Mossel Bay, a harbour town on the Southern Cape of South Africa
- Mossel Bay pincushion (Leucospermum praecox), evergreen rounded upright shrub
- Mossel Bay Commando, light infantry regiment of the South African Army
- Mossel Bay Local Municipality in the Western Cape Province of South Africa
- Mossel, Switzerland, a former municipality in the canton of Fribourg, Switzerland
- Mosel (disambiguation)
