= David Walker (Catholic bishop) =

Australian Roman Catholic bishop

The Most Reverend David Louis Walker
- Bishop Emeritus of Broken Bay
- Church: Catholic Church
- Diocese: Diocese of Broken Bay
- In office: 9 July 1996 – 13 November 2013
- Predecessor: Patrick Murphy
- Successor: Peter Comensoli

Orders
- Ordination: 21 July 1962 by Norman Gilroy
- Consecration: 3 September 1996 by Edward Clancy

Personal details
- Born: 13 November 1938 (age 87) Clovelly, New South Wales, Australia, British Empire

David Louis Walker (born 13 November 1938) is a retired Australian bishop of the Roman Catholic Church. He was ordained bishop of the Roman Catholic Diocese of Broken Bay on 3 September 1996, succeeding the diocese's inaugural bishop, the Most Reverend Patrick Murphy. His retirement was effective from 13 November 2013, his seventy-fifth birthday.

== Early years ==
David Louis Walker spent his childhood in the Sydney suburb of Clovelly until he began seminary training in 1956. His early years in the priesthood were spent teaching theology at St Patrick's College, Manly and at the Catholic Theological Faculty of Sydney.

Walker was director of the Educational Centre for Christian Spirituality which he established in Randwick in 1978 until his appointment as bishop.

== Views ==
Although he has stated that when he was ordained bishop he was a "centrist", Walker is regarded by many Australian Catholics as a progressive bishop owing to his support for lay ministries, laicised priests and "socially progressive" attitudes. He attributes his perceived shift to the left as a consequence of the shift of the Australian Episcopal Conference to the right. He maintains that he has remained in the centre. He has been quoted as saying "when I was made Bishop, I was perceived as being in the centre of ecclesiastical politics. Ten years later I am perceived as being on the left. My views haven't changed."

== Activities ==
Walker is involved in the cause for the beatification of Eileen O'Connor, the co-founder of Our Lady's Nurses for the Poor (the Brown Nurses).

Walker is a speaker and has published on faith renewal, spirituality, mysticism, formation of clergy and church leadership. He is a former member of the Ecumenical Commission of the Archdiocese of Sydney, the New South Wales Ecumenical Council, the Australian Catholic Theological Association and the Committee for the Continuing Education of the Clergy. He was a board member of the Australasian Catholic Record and a former consultant to the National Council of Churches.

Catholic Church titles
Preceded by Patrick Murphy	Bishop of Broken Bay; 1996–2013	Succeeded by Peter Comensoli
