= Valjo Masso =

Estonian agronomist and politician

Valjo Masso (3 June 1933 in Viljandi - 10 September 2013) is an Estonian agronomist and politician. He was a member of VIII Riigikogu.
