= Masso =

Masso may refer to:

- Masso River, a river in Guam
- Masso, Burkina Faso, town in Burkina Faso
- A prefix to denote massage-related activity
- Masso (surname), surname

== See also ==
- Massa (disambiguation)
