= Creston College, University of New South Wales =

Creston College
- University of New South Wales

- Location: 36 High Street, Randwick, New South Wales, Australia
- Established: 1970
- Status: Single-sex (women only)
- Website: Official school webpage

Creston College is an Opus Dei residential college associated with the University of New South Wales. Founded in 1970, Creston College is a project of Foundation for Education and Training (FFET), which aims to promote education and the development of character in accordance with the principles and ideals of Christianity.

As the only all-girls college on campus, Creston aims to inspire women to be leaders in their fields of study and in society, motivating them to make a positive difference in the world, while at the same time having a well-rounded lifestyle. The spiritual formation provided at Creston is entrusted to Opus Dei, a personal Prelature of the Catholic Church.

Creston is located at 36 High Street, Randwick, opposite Gate 9 of UNSW.
