= Parents for Education =

Australian not-for-profit organisation

Parents for Education Foundation
- Abbreviation: PARED Foundation
- Formation: 1982; 44 years ago
- Type: Not-for-profit foundation
- Location: Australia
- Region served: Sydney, New South Wales; Melbourne, Victoria
- Services: Independent Roman Catholic schooling
- Affiliations: Opus Dei
- Students: c. 2,500

The Parents for Education (PARED) Foundation is an Australian not-for-profit organisation that has founded and manages several independent Roman Catholic schools in the Australian cities of Sydney, New South Wales and Melbourne, Victoria. PARED was established in 1982 by parents and educators with a focus on operating schools and other educational projects that support parents in their primary role of raising their children. The PARED Foundation has implemented a one-on-one mentoring system in its schools staffed by members of Opus Dei, and purports to offer an authentic Christian education focused on academic excellence and character development through human virtues.

The organisation has become the subject of scandal throughout its history, due to the teachings offered and association with Opus Dei. Former students have reported experiences ranging from school ostracisation for students receiving the HPV vaccine, teachers promoting self-flagellation to students, and promoting misinformation regarding physiological effects of viewing pornography.

== Overview ==
The founders of the PARED Schools have introduced into Australia a system of education that was developed in Europe in the 1950s for the parents to exercise greater responsibility in the education of their children. PARED is associated with the Institute of Family Studies of the University of Navarre in Pamplona, Spain.

There are now many such schools in operation on five continents. As of 1993, there were over 150 such schools. PARED maintains contact with many of these schools.

PARED founded Tangara School for Girls in 1982. The school initially had two full-time teachers and 17 students. Since then several other schools and campuses have been established in Sydney's metropolitan region (in Cherrybrook, Dural, Wahroonga, Belfield, Orchard Hills, and Werrington), and in the Melbourne suburb of Narre Warren North.

The Schools in Sydney include Tangara School for Girls in Cherrybrook, Redfield College in Dural, Montgrove College in Orchard Hills, and Wollemi College in Werrington. The schools have chaplains who are priests of Opus Dei, a personal prelature of the Catholic Church.

In the schools' Mentoring system, each student is allocated a mentor who meets the student regularly (ideally fortnightly) to check on the student's advancement academically, socially, spiritually etc. The mentor tends to guide their mentee over a period of years, often all through their schooling life. The parent-mentor meeting replaces numerous parent-teacher interviews throughout the year, with the mentor working closely with the students' teachers to ensure meetings provide practical and current feedback.

In 2023, the Australian Broadcasting Corporation released a documentary about the PARED schools and negative experiences from prior students. This documentary revealed traumatic events among alumni about sexual health, an extreme focus on chastity and virginity in girls schools, teachers actively promoting flogging oneself with a discipline, and professing that the viewing of pornography causes physical holes in the brain. Teachers also promoted that men need not seek sexual consent from women. The film also documented Opus Dei numeraries (domestic workers) who acted as the one-on-one student mentors, seeking to recruit young students to join the group. Opus Dei numeraries (often former PARED students) described being forced to self-flagellate and wear other items that inflicted physical pain.

Former NSW premier Dominic Perrottet and other high-level government officials either attended or had family that attended PARED schools.

== The PARED schools ==
- Harkaway Hills College
- Lysterfield Lake College
- Montgrove College
- Redfield College
- Retaval Wahroonga (defunct in 2017)
- Retaval Belfield
- Tangara School for Girls
- Wollemi College

== See also ==
- Catholic education in Australia
