= Mossel Bay Commando =

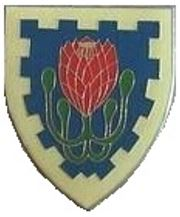
- Mossel Bay Commando emblem
- Active: February 14, 1969 (57 years ago)–April 1, 1997 (29 years ago)
- Country: South Africa
- Allegiance: Republic of South Africa; Republic of South Africa
- Branch: South African Army; South African Army
- Type: Infantry
- Role: Light Infantry
- Size: One Battalion
- Part of: South African Infantry Corps; Army Territorial Reserve
- Garrison/HQ: Mossel Bay

Mossel Bay Commando was a light infantry regiment of the South African Army. It formed part of the South African Army Infantry Formation as well as the South African Territorial Reserve.

== History ==
=== Origin ===
The unit was established on 14 February 1969. It was originally operated from the home of its first commander, Commandant Fred Robertson. In July 1975 a temporary office was established in George. From September 1978 the base moved to Point High School in Mossel Bay. In March 1994 it relocated to the Deon Visagie building headquarters in Voorbaai.

On 1 April 1997 the Mossel Bay commando amalgamated with the Riversdale Commando to form the new Langeberg Commando. The new name was chosen on account of the nearby Langeberg mountain range, which was indicative of the geographical region for which the commando was responsible.

=== Operations ===
==== With the SADF ====
During this era, the unit was mainly used for area force protection, search and cordones as well as stock theft control assistance to the local police.

==== With the SANDF ====
===== Disbandment =====
This unit, along with all other Commando units was disbanded after a decision by South African President Thabo Mbeki to disband all Commando Units. The Commando system was phased out between 2003 and 2008 "because of the role it played in the apartheid era", according to the Minister of Safety and Security Charles Nqakula.

== Unit Insignia ==
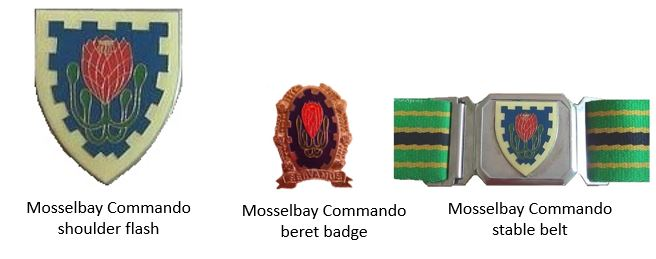
SADF era Mossel Bay Commando insignia

== Leadership ==
The first commander of the Mossel Bay commando was Commandant Frederick (Fred) Fraser Robertson (12 July 1922 – 20 March 1981).

He was succeeded in April 1997 by Lt. Col. W.J. Freund upon the amalgamation with Riversdale Commando.

== See also ==
- South African Commando System
