= Anthony Fisher =

Australian Catholic prelate (born 1960)

The Most Reverend Anthony Fisher OP
- Archbishop of Sydney
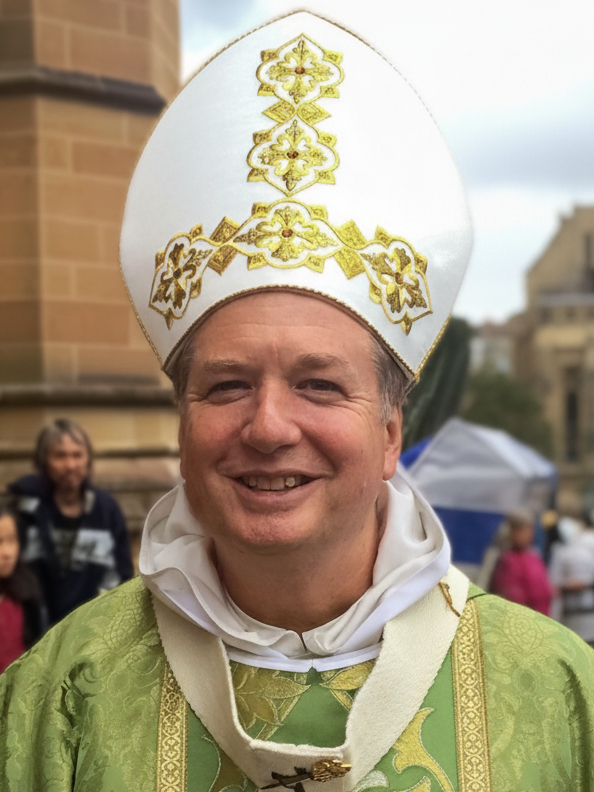
- Fisher in 2015
- Archdiocese: Sydney
- Province: Ecclesiastical Province of Sydney
- Metropolis: Sydney
- Appointed: 18 September 2014
- Installed: 12 November 2014
- Predecessor: George Pell
- Other posts: Member of the Dicastery for the Doctrine of the Faith; Member of the Pontifical Academy for Life; Member of the Dicastery for Promoting Christian Unity
- Previous posts: Bishop of Parramatta (2010–2014); Titular Bishop of Buruni (2003–2010); Auxiliary Bishop of Sydney (2003–2010)

Orders
- Ordination: 14 September 1991 by Eusebius Crawford
- Consecration: 3 September 2003 by George Pell
- Rank: Archbishop

Personal details
- Born: Anthony Colin Joseph Fisher; 10 March 1960 (age 66) Crows Nest, New South Wales, Australia
- Denomination: Roman Catholic
- Occupation: Prelate; Bioethicist; Solicitor
- Education: University of Sydney; Yarra Theological Union; University College, Oxford
- Motto: Latin: Veritatem facientes in caritate, lit. 'Speaking the truth in love'
- Coat of arms: Anthony Fisher's coat of arms
Ordination history of Anthony Fisher
History
Priestly ordination
- Ordained by: Eusebius Crawford
- Date: 14 September 1991
- Place: Church of the Holy Name, Wahroonga
Episcopal consecration
- Principal consecrator: George Pell (Sydney)
- Co-consecrators: Edward Clancy (Sydney); Bernard Cyril O'Grady (Gizo)
- Date: 3 September 2003
- Place: St Mary's Cathedral, Sydney, New South Wales, Australia
Episcopal succession
Bishops consecrated by Anthony Fisher as principal consecrator
- Richard Umbers: 24 August 2016
- Anthony Randazzo: 24 August 2016
- Greg Homeming: 22 February 2017
- Brian Mascord: 22 February 2018
- Daniel Meagher: 8 December 2021
- Anthony Gerard Percy: 2 May 2025
- Peter Murphy: 8 May 2025

Anthony Colin Joseph Fisher OP (born 10 March 1960) is an Australian Catholic prelate who has served as Archbishop of Sydney and as the Catholic Primate of Australia since 2014. He previously served as Bishop of Parramatta from 2010 to 2014 and as an auxiliary bishop for the Archdiocese of Sydney from 2003 to 2010. He is a member of the Dominican Order.

== Early life and education ==
Anthony Colin Joseph Fisher was born the eldest of five children in Crows Nest, Sydney, to Gloria Maguregui, whose father was of Spanish Basque origin and whose mother was half Italian and half Romanian – she migrated with her family to Australia from Asia in the 1950s – and Colin Fisher, a pharmacist from Ashfield with Anglo-Irish roots. He was baptised at St Therese's Church in Lakemba and attended the parish school in 1965 and 1966. The Fisher family lived in Belmore, Canterbury and Wiley Park before moving to Longueville and Manly.

Fisher attended St Michael's Primary School in Lane Cove, Holy Cross College Ryde and Saint Ignatius' College, Riverview, where he was dux in 1977. He studied at the University of Sydney for six years, obtaining a Bachelor of Arts in history with first-class honours and a Bachelor of Laws. He then practised law at the commercial law firm Clayton Utz where he drafted contracts for the redevelopment of the Queen Victoria Building. He took leave from his job as a lawyer to go backpacking around Europe to discern his vocation.

== Priesthood ==
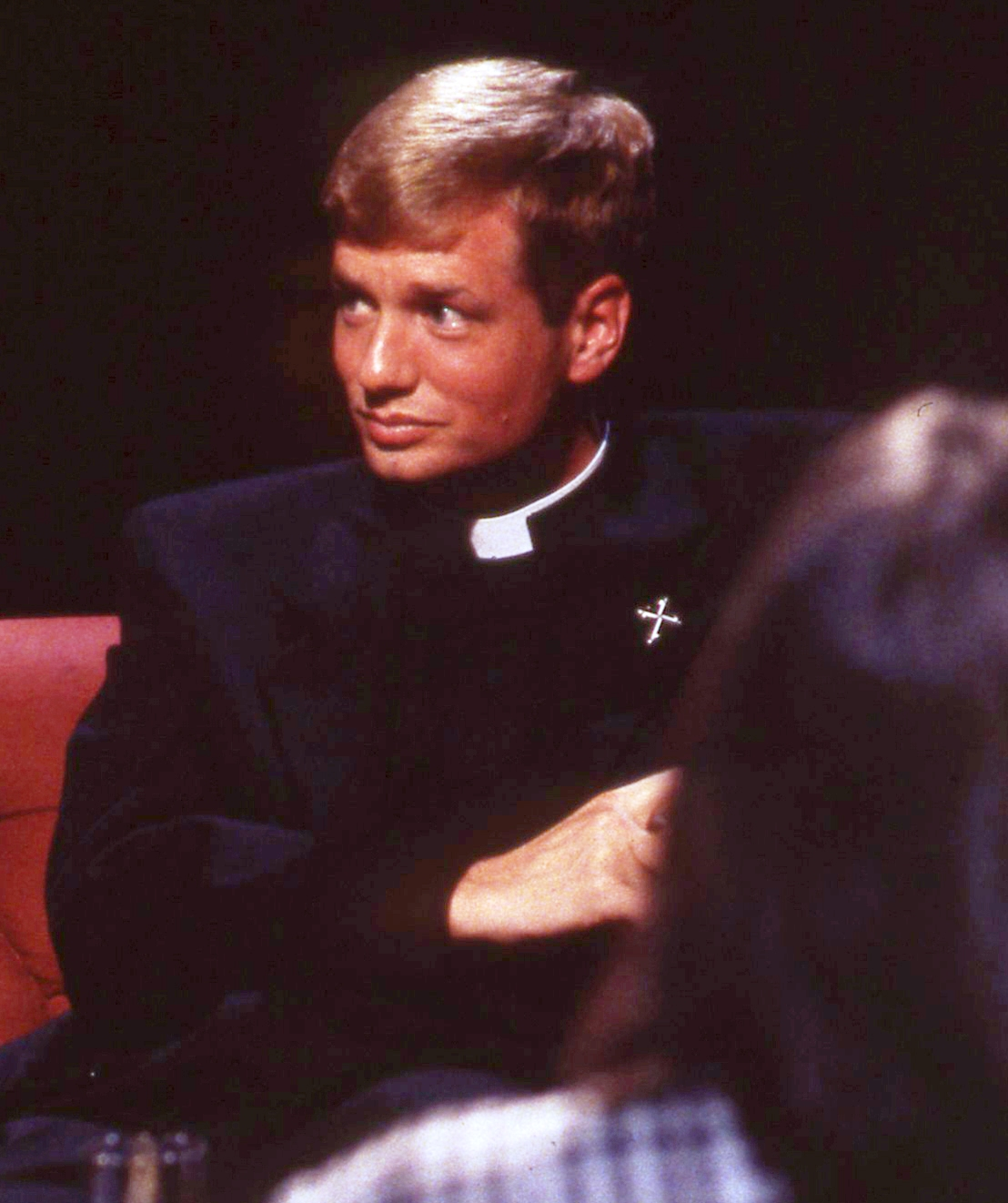
Fisher in 1994

Fisher entered the Order of Preachers in 1985 and studied for the priesthood in Melbourne, receiving an honours degree in theology from the Yarra Theological Union, a member institution of the Melbourne College of Divinity (now called the University of Divinity). He worked for a time at Uniya, a centre for social research in Kings Cross, on immigration and refugee issues, and at Holy Name Parish in Wahroonga, Sydney. He was ordained to the priesthood at Holy Name Church in Wahroonga by Eusebius Crawford OP, Bishop of Gizo, on 14 September 1991.

Fisher undertook doctoral studies in bioethics at the University of Oxford until 1995, matriculating from University College, while residing at Blackfriars Hall. His Doctor of Philosophy degree was granted for a thesis on "Justice in the Allocation of Healthcare". His academic work has included lecturing in Australia and overseas and publishing many books and articles on bioethics and morality. In 1994 he appeared on two British television programs, the bioethics series Brave New World and a special edition of the live discussion program After Dark.

From 1995 to 2000, Fisher was a lecturer at the Australian Catholic University in Melbourne. From 2000 to 2003 he was the foundation director of the John Paul II Institute for Marriage and Family in Melbourne, the Australian campus of a postgraduate pontifical institute with nine campuses around the world. The principal work of the institute was in teaching and research on questions concerning respect for human life and the dignity of the person and support for marriage and family life. The Australian campus ceased operations in December 2018.

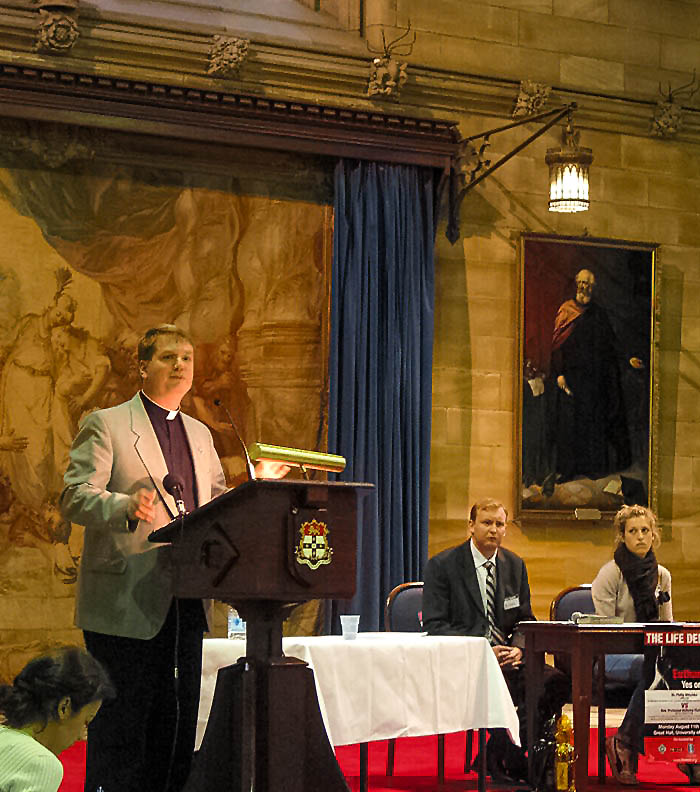
Fisher debating Philip Nitschke at Sydney University, 2003

Styles of Anthony Fisher
- Reference style: The Most Reverend
- Spoken style: Your Grace or My Lord Archbishop
- Religious style: Archbishop

Prior to his episcopal appointment, Fisher was the Master of Students (seminarians) and Socius (deputy) to the prior provincial of the Dominican order in Australia and New Zealand. In the Melbourne archdiocese, he was Episcopal Vicar for Healthcare, spokesman for the archdiocese on matters of ethics, a visiting lecturer at the Catholic Theological College and secretary to the Senate of Priests. His community engagements have included being Chaplain to the Parliament of Victoria, a member of the Infertility Treatment Authority of Victoria, chair or member of several hospital ethics committees, a conventual chaplain ad honorem to the Sovereign Military Order of Malta and a chaplain to various other organisations. He has also had various engagements in parish life and the pastoral care of dying and disabled people. In August 2003, Fisher debated euthanasia activist Philip Nitschke at the Great Hall of the University of Sydney.

== Episcopate ==
=== Auxiliary Bishop of Sydney ===
Fisher was appointed an auxiliary bishop of Sydney and titular Bishop of Buruni by Pope John Paul II on 16 July 2003 and consecrated by Cardinal George Pell at St Mary's Cathedral, Sydney, on 3 September 2003. He took "Speaking the truth in love" (Ephesians 4:15) as his episcopal motto. He was the parish priest of Our Lady Star of the Sea Church, Watsons Bay and Episcopal Vicar for Life and Health in the Archdiocese of Sydney, as well as serving on the Australian Bishops' Commission for Doctrine and Morals and as chair of the Sydney Catholic Schools Board, chair of the Catholic Education Commission of New South Wales, deputy chancellor of the Catholic Institute of Sydney and an adjunct professor at the University of Notre Dame Australia. He has been a member of the Pontifical Academy for Life since 2004.

Fisher was the organiser of World Youth Day 2008 held in Sydney. This was the largest youth gathering and largest religious event ever held in Australia. It attracted 250,000 young people for a week-long festival and 400,000 people for the final Mass with Pope Benedict XVI, which was held at Randwick Racecourse.

=== Bishop of Parramatta ===
Fisher was named the third Bishop of Parramatta by Pope Benedict XVI on 8 January 2010 and was installed on 4 March 2010 in St Patrick's Cathedral, Parramatta. As Bishop of Parramatta, Fisher oversaw the implementation of Faith in Our Future, the pastoral plan for the Diocese of Parramatta, which focussed on growing and sharing faith in the areas of families, youth, ethnicity, vocations and evangelisation. Under his episcopate, Fisher continued as chair of the Catholic Education Commission of New South Wales and adjunct professor in theology at the University of Notre Dame Australia. He was also a member of the company of the Australian Catholic University and served as a member of the Australian Bishops' Commission for Pastoral Life, as chair of the Anti-Euthanasia Task Force and as the Bishops' Delegate for Youth.

Fisher issued a number of pastoral letters to priests and the faithful of the diocese on the themes of confession ("Come back to Me with all your heart", Lent 2011), pastoral planning ("Faith in Our Future", Lent 2012), the child abuse crisis (with the other New South Wales bishops, "Sowing in Tears", Lent 2013), Personal Vocation ("Thy Kingdom Come", Christ the King 2013) and the Eucharist ("This Wonderful Sacrament", Corpus Christi 2014). Following a significant increase in vocations to the priesthood in the Diocese of Parramatta, he directed the building of the new Seminary of the Holy Spirit at Harris Park. On 20 December 2011, he received an honorary Doctor of Laws from the University of Notre Dame Australia.

=== Archbishop of Sydney ===
On 18 September 2014, Pope Francis appointed Fisher as Archbishop of Sydney. The next day, Fisher called for harmony in the community in light of counter-terrorism raids that had just begun. He said, "As a religious leader though I think people of faith have something very important to do and to say at the moment. [These are] troubled times in our world and even in our own city. We need to bring some calm and some restraint and some wisdom at this time." Fisher was installed as Archbishop of Sydney on 12 November 2014 in a ceremony attended by the Lord Mayor of Sydney (Clover Moore), the Premier of New South Wales (Mike Baird) and John Howard, a former Prime Minister of Australia, as well as other politicians and leaders of Orthodox Christian and other religious communities in Sydney.

On 6 May 2015, Pope Francis appointed Fisher a member of the Congregation for the Doctrine of the Faith.

On 13 August 2015, Fisher debated moral philosopher Peter Singer at the Sydney Town Hall about the legalisation of euthanasia. The debate was organised by the Sydney University Catholic Society and adjudicated by the ABC's Editor of Religion and Ethics, Scott Stephens. Fisher argued that euthanasia, "creates two classes of people: those whose lives we value and those whose lives we don't" and that while comforting people through their suffering requires more from society, it also places more value on humanity and endorses the intrinsic value of life.

In December 2015, Fisher was diagnosed with Guillain–Barré syndrome following a gastrointestinal infection. He received intensive care treatment, physiotherapy and rehabilitation at St Vincent's Hospital, Sydney, before moving to Mount Wilga Rehabilitation Centre. The Archdiocese of Sydney announced that Fisher would return to regular, active duties from 5 May 2016 and he celebrated his first public Mass on 29 May 2016.

Pope Francis named Fisher as a member of the Congregation for the Oriental Churches on 6 August 2019. The appointment involves specific dialogue with the Eastern churches in Australia and across the world. Pope Leo XIV named Fisher a member of the Dicastery for Christian Unity in 2025. This involves dialogue within the Orthodox, Anglican and Protestant churches, as well as the Jews.

Fisher is the Grand Prior of the New South Wales Australia Lieutenancy of the Equestrian Order of the Holy Sepulchre of Jerusalem and Chief Chaplain of the Order of Malta in Australia and Conventunal Chaplain Grand Cross ad honorem.

As Archbishop, Fisher has issued pastoral letters to priests and faithful on hope and peace in a time of insecurity (Let Your Light Shine, Easter 2015), on religious life (For all the Saints, November 2015), on the child sexual abuse crisis (Sackcloth and Ashes, Lent 2017; Stir up our hearts, Advent 2017), on youth and faith (My Dear Young Friends, 2018), on the COVID-19 pandemic (2021 and 2021), on Mass attendance (Come Home to Mass, December 2020), on synodality (Walking Together in Communion, Participation and Mission, October 2023), on the Eucharistic Congress (Wonderful News!, 2024) and on the Synod of Sydney (Toward a more Prayerful, Christlike and Missionary Church, February 2025).

=== Response to child sexual abuse cases ===
In July 2008, when asked at a World Youth Day press conference about an alleged case of clerical sexual abuse in Melbourne years earlier, Fisher said: "Happily, I think most of Australia was enjoying delighting in the beauty and goodness of these young people and the hope — the hope for us doing these sorts of things better in the future — as we saw last night [at World Youth Day], rather than, than dwelling crankily, as a few people are doing, on old wounds." The father of the alleged victims and advocates for survivors of abuse reacted angrily and criticised Fisher's language. One said: "We've had non-stop calls from family members who are angry and distressed about this young Bishop's response." Fisher said his comment had been taken out of context: "I called the reporters cranky and, boy, did I get jumped upon ... they said I was calling the abuse victims cranky, which I certainly wasn't doing." (Note: A year later, and after the publication of Fisher's "out of context" explanation, the Sydney Morning Herald continued to cite Fisher's original language as evidence that "At times, [the church] has given the clear impression that it wishes sexual abuse victims would shut up and go away.")

When he became archbishop, Fisher committed the church to doing better in its response to child sexual abuse cases. Upon being named archbishop, he said, "Victims of abuse and all young people must come first – no excuses, no cover-ups. The Church must do better in this area and I am committed to playing a leading role in regaining the confidence of the community and of our own members."

He stated that the "Church in Australia is going through a period of public scrutiny and self-examination" and expressed his hope that it "will emerge from this purified, humbler, more compassionate and spiritually regenerated". He lamented the institutionalised child sexual abuse that occurred historically in his former Diocese of Parramatta and took the opportunity to apologise for what he acknowledged as the Church's failure to properly assist victims. Speaking of previous abuse cases, he reiterated his desire for openness and change saying, "We want to make sure every child is safe and cherished going forward."

At the Mass for his installation as Archbishop of Sydney, Fisher said: "To survivors of abuse and all affected I say: the Church is - I am - profoundly sorry for what happened. All young people must be cherished and protected. The Church can do better and I am committed to giving a lead in this area. I pray that the Church will emerge from this period of public scrutiny humbler, more compassionate and spiritually regenerated. Only then will we regain credibility and trust in many people's eyes." He repeated this apology at the Royal Commission into Institutional Responses to Child Sexual Abuse and held a service of Prayers of Forgiveness and Reparation at St Mary's Cathedral following the release of the commission's final report.

== Views ==
=== Australian federal election, 2016 ===
In the campaign cycle leading up to the 2016 federal elections, Fisher condemned the policies of the Australian Greens describing them as "nasty" and contravening "basic moral standards", specifically calling out their policies regarding same-sex marriage, removing religious "exemptions" in anti-discrimination laws and their support of the Safe Schools Programme. He also called on the government to honour its commitment to take in Syrian Christian refugees and put in place common-sense policies regarding refugees and asylum seekers in light of the exposition of abuse suffered by detainees in offshore processing centres. He stated that it was a "matter of striking a balance" although adding that "[he did not] know all the answers".

This followed calls that he made in September 2015 exhorting the government to consider increasing its humanitarian refugee intake and to prioritise Christians fleeing Syria believing it necessary due to "campaigns to drive Christians from the Middle East". Both the Anglican and Catholic churches in Australia had also asked the government to consider increasing its yearly humanitarian refugee intake by 10,000.

=== Same-sex marriage and other LGBT issues ===
Fisher has consistently opposed the legalisation of same-sex marriage. According to The Independent newspaper, this is "part of his general stance against increased rights for LGBT people." New Ways Ministry has drawn attention to a number of "LGBT-negative statements" Fisher has made. In March 2017, Fisher stated that businesses such as Qantas and Telstra should not sponsor Pride events aimed at supporting LGBT staff or encouraging non-discrimination, nor lobby in favour of the legalisation of same-sex marriage. He accused private sector chief executives of applying "pink bans" to other companies or executives that did not support such issues.

In August 2017, during the political debate to determine whether Australia should introduce same-sex marriage, Fisher argued that religious schools, charities and hospitals could be coerced to comply with the "new view of marriage" if the majority of Australians opted for a change in legislation and that teachers would not be free to follow the "traditional" church teaching on marriage, but instead be forced to teach a more "politically correct" curriculum. He said that religious believers would be vulnerable to discrimination suits and could even lose their jobs if same-sex marriage is legalised. He also wrote a letter to all parents of children in Catholic schools across New South Wales to advise them to vote no to a change in the law. Same-sex marriage was subsequently introduced to Australia by an act of federal parliament in December 2017 following widespread support in a national postal survey. Fisher said he was "deeply disappointed" with the result.

=== Gonski Report ===
In 2017, the Turnbull government decided to adopt the key recommendations of the 2011 Gonski Report commissioned by the Gillard government. There were concerns from the Opposition and other faith-based education providers that the needs-based funding model the Government proposed to adopt would disproportionately affect faith-based schools. In response, Fisher welcomed the Government's decision to adopt a needs-based funding model but decried its falling short of what Gonski recommended in his original report. He also denied all allegations that the Catholic Church was asking for special treatment for its schools with respect to funding and stated that whilst, on a cursory examination, needs-based funding seemed equitable, it would disproportionately affect students from poor socioeconomic backgrounds in low-fee Catholic schools.

== Public lectures ==
In 2022, Fisher delivered the thirty-fifth Erasmus Lecture, titled The West: Post- or Pre-Christian? hosted by First Things magazine and the Institute on Religion and Public Life. In his lecture, Fisher reflected on the state of Christianity in contemporary Western culture, asking whether the secular age marks the end of the Christian era or the beginning of a renewed evangelization. He examined the challenges of relativism, moral fragmentation, and the loss of transcendence in public life, while proposing hope for cultural and spiritual renewal rooted in Christian faith.

== Writings ==
- Fisher, Anthony (1989). IVF: The Critical Issues. Melbourne: Collins Dove.
- ——— (1991). I am a stranger: will you welcome me? The immigration debate. Melbourne: Collins Dove/ACSJC.
- with Jane Buckingham (1991) [First published 1985]. Abortion in Australia: Answers and Alternatives. Sydney: Foundation for Human Development.
- with B. Tobin; C. Gleeson; M. Byrne (2001). Code of Ethical Standards for Catholic Health and Aged Care Services in Australia. Canberra: Catholic Health Australia.
- with F. Gomez; H. Bustamanthe (1996). Relevant Ethical Issues in Healthcare. Manila: UST Bioethics.
- with L. Gormally; et al. (2001). Healthcare Allocation: An Ethical Framework for Public Policy. London: Linacre Centre.
- ——— (2011). Catholic Bioethics for a New Millennium. New York City, USA: Cambridge University Press.
- ——— (2017). The Healing Peace of Christ: Reflections on Illness and Recovery, Death and New Life. Sydney: St Paul's.
- ——— (2018). War and Terror, Peace and Hope. Sydney: St Paul's.
- ——— (2018). My Dear Young Friend: Letters on Youth, Faith and Future. Sydney: St Paul's.
- ——— (2023). Unity in Christ: Bishops, Synodality, and Communion. Washington, D.C.: Catholic University of America Press.

== Notes ==
Catholic Church titles
Preceded by Ismail Rueda Sierra	Titular Bishop of Buruni; 2003-2010	Succeeded by Raphael Thattil
Preceded by Kevin Michael Manning	Bishop of Parramatta; 2010–2014	Succeeded by Vincent Long Van Nguyen
Preceded by George Pell	Archbishop of Sydney; 2014–present	Incumbent
