= Archdiocese of Sydney =

Latin Catholic ecclesiastical territory in Australia

Coordinates: 33.8711°S 151.2130°E

Archdiocese of Sydney Archidioecesis Sydneyensis
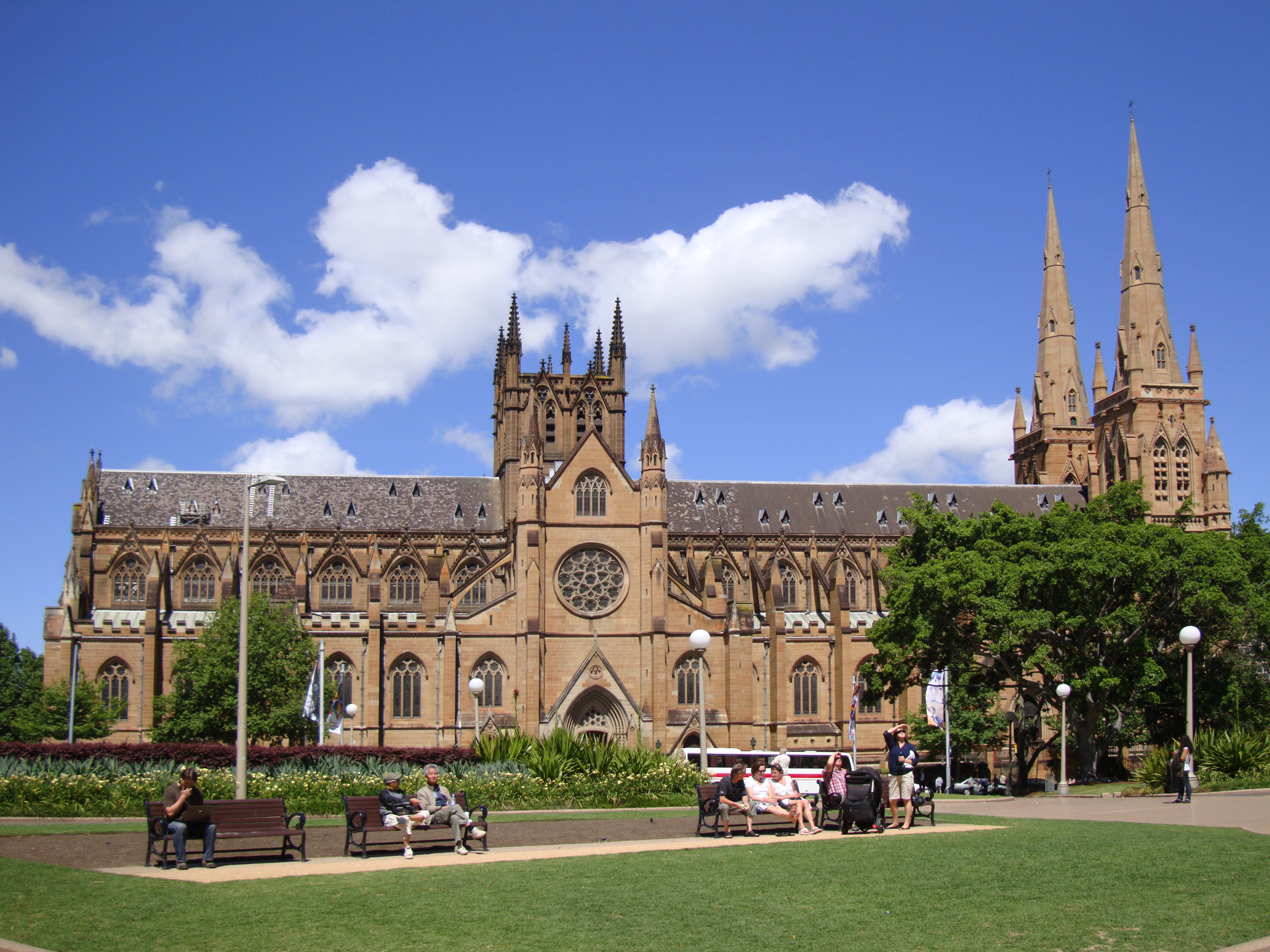
- Metropolitan Cathedral of Saint Mary

Location
- Country: Australia
- Territory: South-western Sydney, Canterbury-Bankstown, Inner West, most of Sydney's northern suburbs, lower north shore, eastern suburbs, St George, Sutherland, and the northern part of the Macarthur region Norfolk Island
- Ecclesiastical province: Sydney
- Deaneries: 9
- Subdivisions: 3

Statistics
- Area: 1,264 km^{2} (488 sq mi)
- Population: Total; Catholics: (as of 2020); ▲2,760,900; ▲667,900 ( 24.2%)
- Parishes: ▼129

Information
- Denomination: Catholic Church
- Sui iuris church: Latin Church
- Rite: Roman Rite
- Established: 1834: Vicariate Apostolic of New Holland and Van Diemen’s Land; 5 April 1842: Diocese of Sydney; 22 April 1842: Archdiocese of Sydney
- Cathedral: Cathedral Church and Minor Basilica of the Immaculate Mother of God, Help of Christians
- Patron saint: Our Lady Help of Christians
- Secular priests: 250

Current leadership
- Pope: Leo XIV
- Metropolitan Archbishop: Anthony Fisher OP
- Auxiliary Bishops: Richard Umbers; Anthony Percy
- Vicar General: Gerald Gleeson
- Episcopal Vicars: Richard Umbers; Paul Monkerud; Kelvin Lovegrove; Michael McLean; Roland Maurer
- Judicial Vicar: Julian Wellspring
- Bishops emeritus: Terence Brady

Map
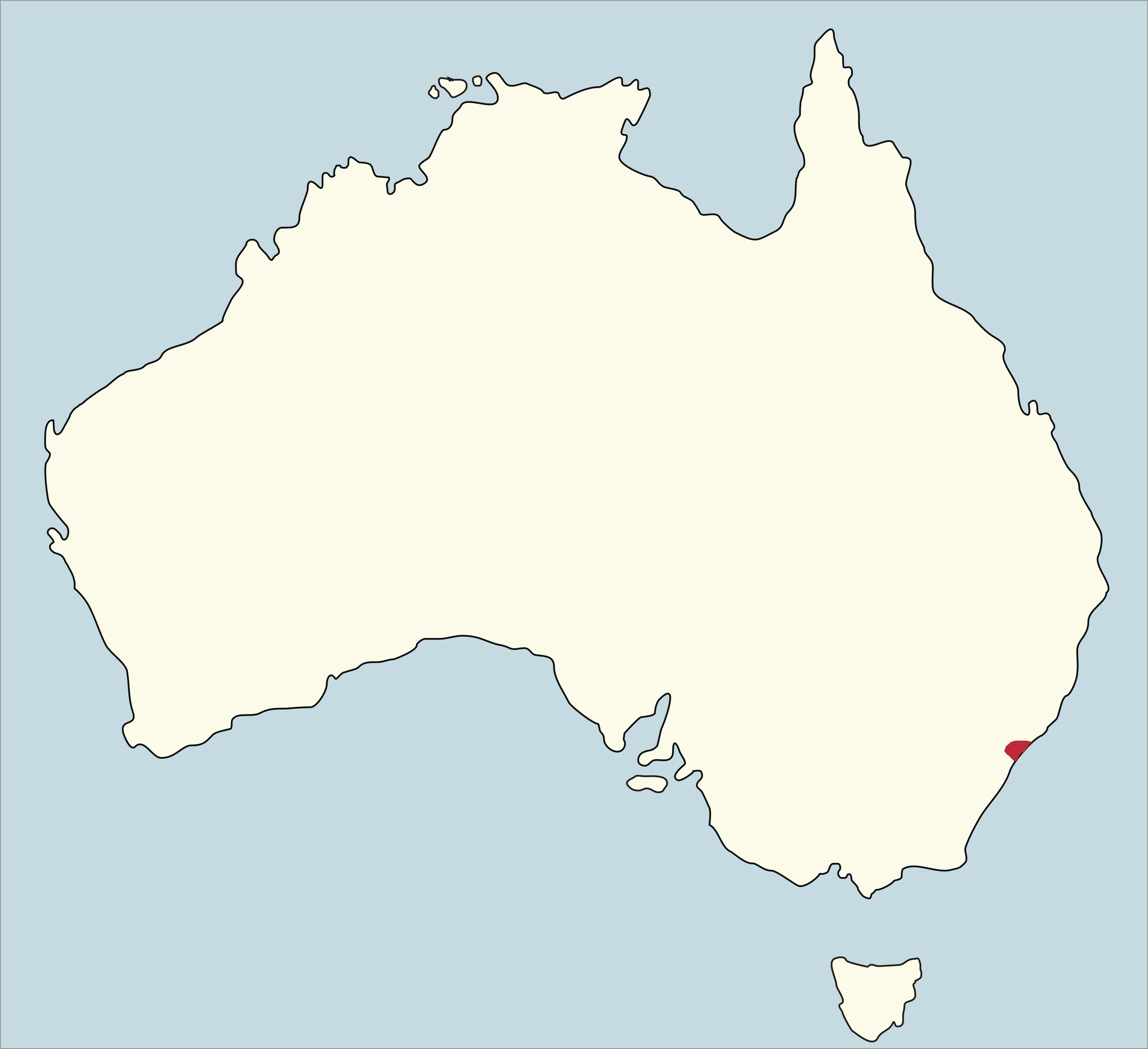

Website
- Official website of the Archdiocese

The Archdiocese of Sydney (Latin: Archidioecesis Sydneyensis) is a Latin Church ecclesiastical territory or archdiocese of the Catholic Church. Its episcopal see is Sydney, New South Wales, Australia.

Erected in 1842, the archdiocese is the metropolitan see for the suffragan dioceses of Armidale, Bathurst, Broken Bay, Lismore, Maitland-Newcastle, Parramatta, Wagga Wagga, Wilcannia-Forbes and Wollongong. The Military Ordinariate of Australia, as well as the Melkite Catholic Eparchy of St Michael, Archangel and the Maronite Diocese of St Maroun—these latter two Eastern Catholic—are also associated with the archdiocese.

St Mary's Cathedral is the seat of the Catholic Archbishop of Sydney. The current archbishop is Anthony Fisher.

The Archdiocese of Sydney is involved in many different agencies within Sydney to provide services, care and support to people in need, including aged care; education; health care; prayer, worship and liturgy; solidarity and justice; vocations and seminary; youth and young adults ministry.

== History ==
Fr James Dixon, a convict priest, ministered in Sydney from 1803 to 1809 with the title Prefect Apostolic of New Holland. In 1819, two priests were officially authorised by the British government to minister to the Catholics of the Australian colony. Until 1834, the territory of the entire Australian mainland (including what is now the Archdiocese of Sydney) and the island of Tasmania was a distant outpost of the Vicariate Apostolic of Mauritius.

On 12 May 1834, the Vicariate Apostolic of New Holland and Van Diemen's Land was created and Father John Bede Polding, an English Benedictine, was appointed vicar apostolic with jurisdiction over what is now the Commonwealth of Australia.

The Diocese of Sydney (Dioecesis Sydneyensis) was created on 28 February 1842 with Bishop Polding as its diocesan bishop. On 5 April 1842 the Apostolic Vicariate of Adelaide and the Vicariate Apostolic of Hobart were erected, on territory split from the Diocese of Sydney. On 22 April 1842, the Apostolic Vicariate of Adelaide was promoted as the Diocese of Adelaide and the Vicariate Apostolic of Hobart became the Diocese of Hobart. The Diocese of Sydney was elevated to an archdiocese and a metropolitan see, with Hobart and Adelaide as suffragans. At that time, the Archdiocese of Sydney included the whole of the eastern portion of the continent, comprising what are now known as the states of New South Wales, Victoria and Queensland.

In 1848 the Diocese of Melbourne was created out of territory of the then Sydney archdiocese. In 1859, the Diocese of Brisbane was established, with responsibility for the entire state of Queensland.

At present, the Archbishop of Sydney is metropolitan of all the dioceses of New South Wales, with the exception of portions of the Archdiocese of Canberra and Goulburn, which are geographically situated outside the Australian Capital Territory. The suffragan dioceses are: Maitland (1847), Armidale (1862), Bathurst (1865), Lismore (1887), Wilcannia-Forbes (1887), Wagga Wagga (1917), Wollongong (1951), Parramatta (1986) and Broken Bay (1986).

The Archdiocese of Sydney is also responsible for Catholics on Norfolk Island. The island's sole parish, Sacred Heart, was established in 1959 and is based at St Philip Howard Church, Kingston. The island's last parish priest departed in 1987, although the Archbishop of Sydney and his representatives make regular visits.

== Cathedral ==
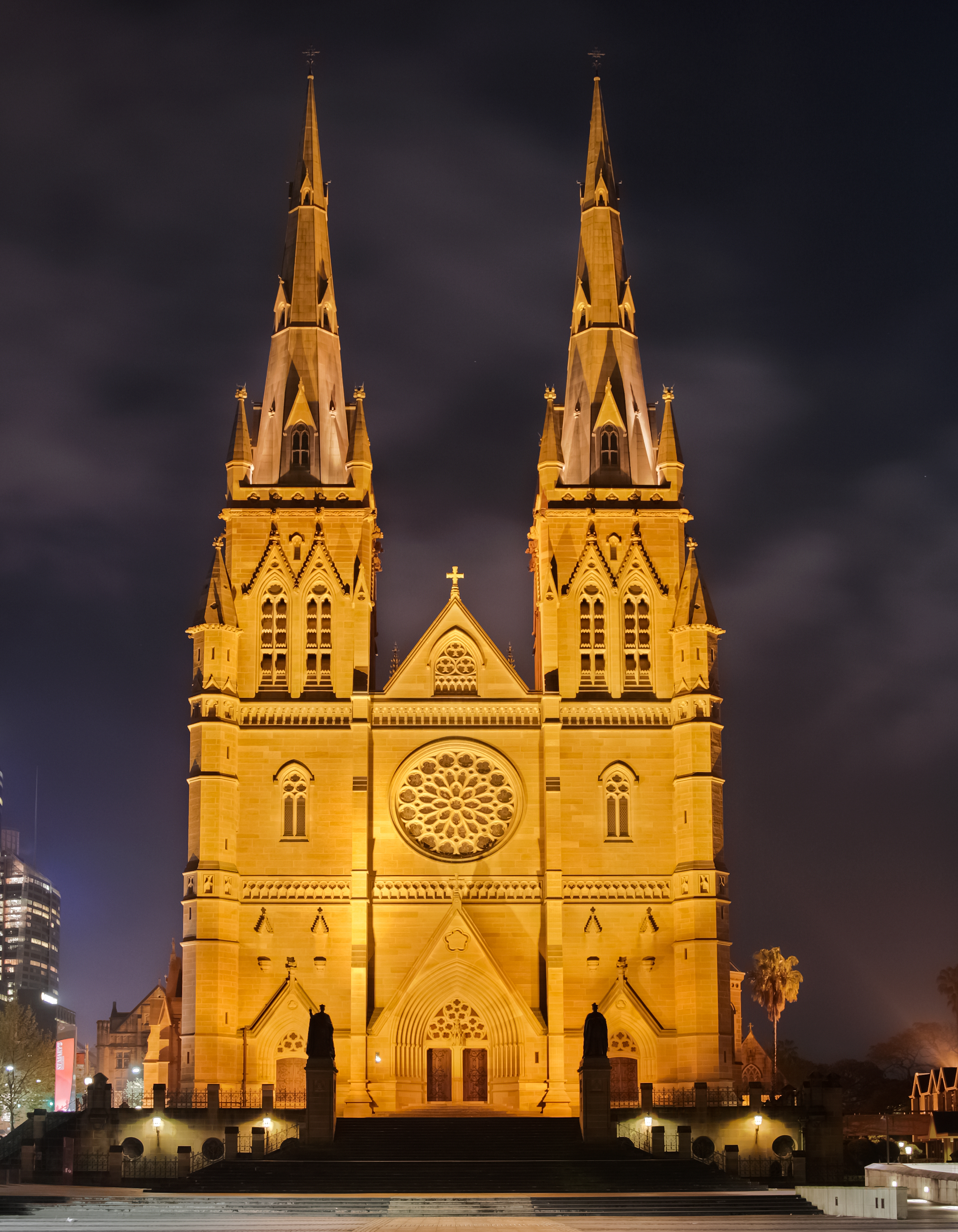
St Mary's Cathedral, Sydney; front, facing south

The "Metropolitan Cathedral of St Mary" is the cathedral church of the Archdiocese of Sydney and the seat of the Catholic Archbishop of Sydney. The cathedral is dedicated to "Mary, Help of Christians", Patron of Australia.

St Mary's holds the title and dignity of a minor basilica, bestowed upon it by Pope Pius XI in 1930.

St Mary's is the largest church in Australia, though not the highest. It is located on College Street in the heart of the City of Sydney where, despite the high rise development of the Sydney central business district, its imposing structure and twin spires make it a landmark from every direction. In 2008, St Mary's Cathedral became the focus of World Youth Day 2008 and was visited by Pope Benedict XVI.

A foundation stone for the cathedral was laid in 1821 by Governor Lachlan Macquarie and completed in 1851. When this cathedral was destroyed by fire in June 1865, plans were put in place for the construction of the current cathedral. Constructed in the Geometric Decorated Gothic Revival style based on the designs of William Wardell, a foundation stone for the current cathedral was laid in 1868, with a dedication Mass held in 1882. Further construction of the nave commenced in 1913 and was dedicated in 1928. The richly decorated crypt was completed in 1961 and the most recent additions, two pinnacled spires, were commenced in 2000 and completed in advance of World Youth Day 2008.

St Mary's Cathedral College, located adjacent to the cathedral, was founded in 1824 and is a secondary day school that caters for approximately 850 boys and girls from Years 5 to 12. It was administered by the Congregation of Christian Brothers from 1910 until 2016.

St Mary's Cathedral Choir, the oldest musical institution in Australia, is formed of approximately 40 choristers and sings at High Mass every Sunday and on special holy days.

== Bishops ==
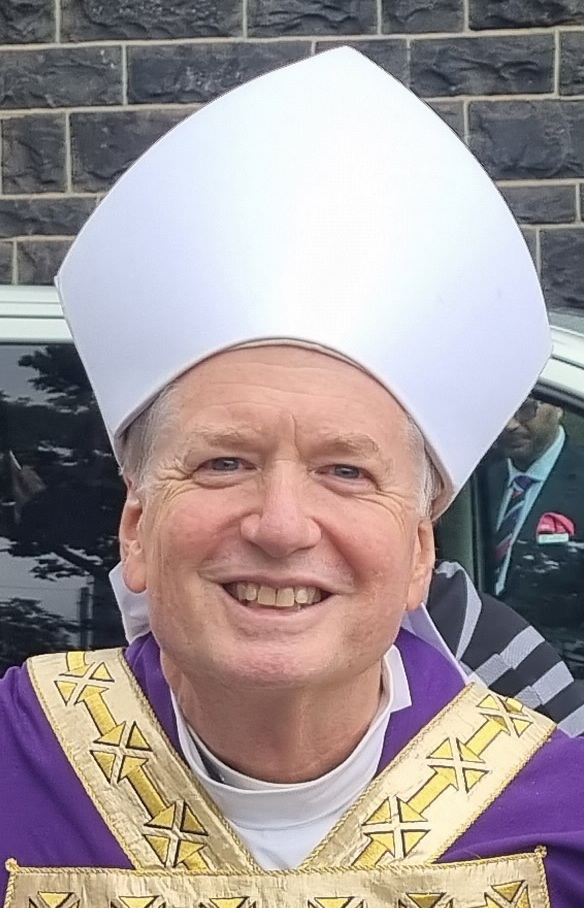
Sydney's present Archbishop Anthony Fisher

=== Ordinaries ===
The following individuals have been elected as Archbishop of Sydney, with a number elected as cardinals, as well as receiving civilian honours. Their highest title is shown here:

Order	Name	Title	Date installed	Ministry ended	Term of office	Reason for term end
1	John Bede Polding, OSB	Vicar Apostolic of New Holland and Van Diemen's Land	3 July 1832	5 April 1842	9 years, 276 days days	Elevated to Bishop of Sydney
1	John Bede Polding, OSB	Bishop of Sydney	5 April 1842	22 April 1842	17 days	Elevated to Archbishop of Sydney
1	John Bede Polding, OSB	Archbishop of Sydney	22 April 1842	16 March 1877	34 years, 328 days	Died in office
2	Roger Bede Vaughan, OSB	Coadjutor Archbishop of Sydney	28 February 1873	16 March 1877	4 years, 16 days	Elevated to Archbishop of Sydney
2	Roger Bede Vaughan, OSB	Archbishop of Sydney	16 March 1877	17 August 1883	6 years, 154 days	Died in office
3	Patrick Cardinal Moran	Archbishop of Sydney	14 March 1884	17 August 1911	27 years, 156 days	Died in office
3	Patrick Cardinal Moran	Cardinal-Priest of Santa Susanna	27 July 1885	17 August 1911	26 years, 21 days	Died in office
4	Michael Kelly	Coadjutor Archbishop of Sydney	16 July 1901	17 August 1911	10 years, 32 days	Elevated to Archbishop of Sydney
4	Michael Kelly	Archbishop of Sydney	17 August 1911	8 March 1940	28 years, 204 days	Died in office
5	Sir Norman Cardinal Gilroy, KBE	Coadjutor Archbishop of Sydney	1 July 1937	8 March 1940	2 years, 251 days	Elevated to Archbishop of Sydney
5	Sir Norman Cardinal Gilroy, KBE	Archbishop of Sydney	8 March 1940	9 July 1971	31 years, 123 days	Retired as Archbishop Emeritus of Sydney
5	Sir Norman Cardinal Gilroy, KBE	Cardinal-Priest of Santi Quattro Coronati	18 February 1946	21 October 1977	31 years, 245 days	Died in office
6	Sir James Cardinal Freeman, KBE	Archbishop of Sydney	9 July 1971	12 February 1983	11 years, 218 days	Retired as Archbishop Emeritus of Sydney
6	Sir James Cardinal Freeman, KBE	Cardinal-Priest of Santa Maria Regina Pacis in Ostia mare	5 March 1973	16 March 1991	18 years, 11 days	Died in office
7	Edward Cardinal Clancy, AC	Auxiliary Bishop of Sydney	25 October 1973	24 Nov 1978	3 years, 30 days	Elevated to Archbishop of Canberra (and Goulburn)
7	Edward Cardinal Clancy, AC	Archbishop of Sydney	12 February 1983	26 March 2001	18 years, 42 days	Retired as Archbishop Emeritus of Sydney
7	Edward Cardinal Clancy, AC	Cardinal-Priest of Santa Maria in Vallicella	28 June 1988	3 August 2014	26 years, 36 days	Died in office
8	George Cardinal Pell, AC	Archbishop of Sydney	26 March 2001	24 February 2014	12 years, 335 days	Named Prefect of the Secretariat for the Economy
8	George Cardinal Pell, AC	Cardinal-Priest of Santa Maria Domenica Mazzarello	21 October 2003	10 January 2023	19 years, 81 days	Died in office
9	Anthony Fisher, OP	Auxiliary Bishop of Sydney	3 September 2003	4 March 2010	6 years, 182 days	Named Bishop of Parramatta
9	Anthony Fisher, OP	Bishop of Parramatta	4 March 2010	12 November 2014	4 years, 253 days	Installed as Archbishop of Sydney
9	Anthony Fisher, OP	Archbishop of Sydney	12 November 2014	present	12 years, 10 days	

Coadjutors are included in the table above. In addition:

- Richard Placid Burchall, O.S.B. was appointed Coadjutor Bishop on 9 July 1847 but the appointment did not take effect.
- Michael Sheehan was Coadjutor Archbishop, 22 February 1922 to 1 July 1937, and then resigned from such.

=== Auxiliary bishops ===
- Samuel John Augustine Sheehy, O.S.B. (1866–1868), did not take effect
- Joseph Hoare (1888), did not take effect
- Joseph Higgins (1888–1899), appointed Bishop of Rockhampton
- Eris Norman Michael O'Brien (1948–1953), appointed Archbishop of Canberra (and Goulburn)
- Patrick Francis Lyons (1950–1956), appointed Coadjutor Bishop of Sale
- James Patrick Carroll (1954–1984)
- James Darcy Freeman (1956–1968), appointed Bishop of Armidale (later returned here as Archbishop); future Cardinal
- Thomas William Muldoon (1960–1982)
- Edward Francis Kelly, M.S.C. (1969–1975), appointed Bishop of Toowoomba
- Edward Bede Clancy (1973–1978), appointed Archbishop of Canberra and Goulburn, then appointed Archbishop of Sydney; future Cardinal
- David Cremin (1973–2005)
- Patrick Laurence Murphy (1976–1986), appointed Bishop of Broken Bay
- Bede Vincent Heather (1979–1986), appointed Bishop of Parramatta
- John Edward Heaps (1981–1992)
- Geoffrey James Robinson (1984–2004)
- Peter William Ingham (1993–2001), appointed Bishop of Wollongong, Retired
- Anthony Colin Joseph Fisher, O.P. (2003–2010), appointed Bishop of Parramatta, now appointed Archbishop of Sydney
- Julian Charles Porteous (2003–2013), appointed Archbishop of Hobart
- Terence John Gerard Brady (2007–2022), appointed Auxiliary Bishop Emeritus of Sydney
- Peter Andrew Comensoli (2011–2014), appointed Bishop of Broken Bay, now appointed Archbishop of Melbourne
- Richard James Umbers (2016–current)
- Anthony Randazzo (2016–2019), appointed Bishop of Broken Bay
- Daniel Meagher (2021–2026), appointed Bishop of Rockhampton
- Anthony Percy (2025–current)

=== Other priests of this diocese who became bishops ===
- John Dunne (priest here, 1870–1871), appointed Bishop of Wilcannia in 1887
- William Hayden, appointed Bishop of Wilcannia–Forbes in 1918
- William Barry, appointed Coadjutor Archbishop of Hobart in 1919
- James Whyte, appointed Bishop of Dunedin, New Zealand in 1920
- Justin Daniel Simonds, appointed Archbishop of Hobart in 1937
- John Thomas Toohey, appointed Coadjutor Bishop of Maitland in 1948
- John Neil Cullinane, appointed Auxiliary Bishop of Canberra (and Goulburn) in 1959
- Henry Joseph Kennedy, appointed Auxiliary Bishop of Brisbane in 1967
- William Edward Murray, appointed Bishop of Wollongong in 1975
- Patrick Dougherty, appointed Auxiliary Bishop of Canberra (and Goulburn) in 1976
- Geoffrey Francis Mayne, appointed Bishop of Australia, Military in 1985
- Michael John Malone, appointed Coadjutor Bishop of Maitland in 1994
- Barry Francis Collins, appointed Bishop of Wilcannia–Forbes in 1994
- David Louis Walker, appointed Bishop of Broken Bay in 1996
- Christopher Henry Toohey, appointed Bishop of Wilcannia–Forbes in 2001
- William Joseph Wright, appointed Bishop of Maitland–Newcastle in 2011
- Robert Michael McGuckin, appointed Bishop of Toowoomba in 2012

== Other information ==
People who identify as Catholic in Sydney as a percentage of the local population, according to the 2011 census, divided geographically by statistical area level 1.

There are around 577,000 Catholics in the archdiocese, with a total population of 2,085,000. The Catholic population is 27.7% of the total. There are 139 parishes, in the pastoral care of around 246 diocesan priests. There are some 480 priests in total, including religious priests, working within the archdiocese, including those on lesser duties and retired priests. There are 1,238 religious sisters and 275 religious brothers and five permanent deacons.

While Archbishop of Sydney, Cardinal Clancy established the Seminary of the Good Shepherd in the Sydney suburb of Homebush in 1996. It serves men who are in formation for diocesan priesthood for the Archdiocese of Sydney and a number of dioceses from the province of New South Wales and beyond. The Seminary of the Good Shepherd replaced St Patrick's College, Manly.

Part of the Archdiocese of Sydney's initiatives for young adults is the social networking site Xt3. Standing for 'Christ in the Third Millennium', Xt3 is a content-driven social networking site launched at World Youth Day 2008, held in Sydney.

== Controversy ==
The Catholic sexual abuse scandal in Australia is part of the wider Catholic sexual abuse scandal which are a series of convictions, trials and ongoing investigations into allegations of sex crimes committed by Catholic priests and members of religious orders.

Across the Archdiocese of Sydney, in 2007, Ross Murrin, 52, a former Sydney Catholic school teacher and Marist brother, accused of indecently assaulting eight male Year 5 students at a Daceyville school in south-east Sydney in 1974, pleaded guilty to some of the 21 charges.

=== Pope Benedict's statement ===
On 19 July 2008, before a congregation of 3,400 assembled in St Mary's Cathedral, Pope Benedict XVI lamented that child sex abuse had taken place and the pain it caused. He also condemned those responsible for it and demanded punishment for them. However, he did not state or imply that the institutional church, or any of its leaders, accepted any responsibility for what had taken place. His statement reads:

"Here I would like to pause to acknowledge the shame which we have all felt as a result of the sexual abuse of minors by some clergy and religious in this country. I am deeply sorry for the pain and suffering the victims have endured and I assure them that, as their pastor, I too share in their suffering. ... Victims should receive compassion and care, and those responsible for these evils must be brought to justice. These misdeeds, which constitute so grave a betrayal of trust, deserve unequivocal condemnation. I ask all of you to support and assist your bishops, and to work together with them in combating this evil. It is an urgent priority to promote a safer and more wholesome environment, especially for young people."

On 21 July 2008, before flying out of Australia, Pope Benedict met at St Mary's Cathedral, Sydney, with two male and two female victims of sex abuse by priests. He listened to their stories and celebrated Mass with them. The Premier of New South Wales, Morris Iemma, said that "Hopefully it will be a sign of righting the wrongs of the past and of a better future and better treatment by the church of the victims and their families." Mark Fabbro, a victim of abuse and member of the Catholic Abuse Survivors Collective, said that while he was "happy to receive the apology, we still consider it indirect and insufficient". Chris MacIsaac of the victims' rights advocacy group Broken Rites said the Pope had taken his apology further than his previous comments on the issue as he has "never put it quite so strongly before", but expressed disappointment that the Pope had not made his apology directly to sexual abuse victims. One Australian victim of sexual abuse by a Catholic priest has stated in the media: Dealing with the church itself was a hell of a lot more traumatic than dealing with the abuse.

== See also ==
- Roman Catholicism in Australia
