= Warrane College, University of New South Wales =

Warrane College
- Type: Residential College
- Established: 1971
- Academic affiliations: University of New South Wales
- Dean: Alex Perrottet
- Master: Associate Professor Xavier Symons
- Students: 135 men
- Location: Sydney, Australia
- Campus: Kensington
- Colours: Red
- Website: warrane.unsw.edu.au

Warrane College UNSW is an affiliated residential college at the University of New South Wales, Australia. The name of the college is derived from the Aboriginal word for the Sydney Cove area, "Warrang", highlighting the recognition by Warrane and UNSW of Australia's indigenous people as original inhabitants of the land on which they are located. In 2021, Warrane celebrated 50 years since its official opening.

== History ==
The prehistory of Warrane can be traced to the 1950s, when the Catholic archbishop of Sydney, Sir Norman Thomas Gilroy, first came into contact with members of Opus Dei and a sample of their educational initiatives in Europe. Around that time, the Archdiocese had the desire to establish a Residential College at UNSW under Catholic auspices. Opus Dei, an institution of the Catholic Church, provided the opportunity for this desire to become a reality and was invited to operate the college. Education Development Association (EDA), a not-for-profit company and a registered charity, was set up to own and operate Warrane College and future initiatives of similar nature. Pastoral care is entrusted to Opus Dei.

Evening shot of Warrane College

Warrane began operating at its present site in 1971 in an eight storey building on Anzac Parade, Kensington, in the south-western corner of the UNSW campus. Warrane was officially opened by Sir Roden Cutler. Its five residential floors each provide accommodation for groups of 25 residents, two of whom are residential tutors. Since 2008 all bedrooms and bathrooms as well as dining and kitchen facilities, common areas and offices have been renovated.

The college has had five Masters since 1971.

Senior staff members live in the college and oversee the pastoral care of residents. Two residential tutors live on each residential floor. Tutors are mentors to the students, providing academic and personal support. Several academic tutors and residential fellows live in the College. They are distinguished academic staff or students of UNSW who conduct the academic program of the college, including formal tutorials and consultation times for different university subjects.

== Student life ==
The majority of students are undergraduates, with almost half in their first year. While residents are from most university faculties, a large proportion belong to the faculties of Engineering, Science and Medicine, and the UNSW Business School. There are normally several residents undertaking higher degree programs at UNSW such as Masters and Doctoral programs and younger students benefit from their experience. There is an extensive academic tutoring programme in the college, with over half of the college usually achieving a Distinction or High Distinction average each term.

One of the main features of college life is the weekly formal dinner, which normally features guest speakers, including politicians, sportsmen, academics and business leaders. The college hosts several faculty nights during the year with guest speakers in specific fields talking to residents about career options, the "big picture" of their profession and how to serve society through their work.

A good example of a formal dinner guest speaker, including a quote from Socrates, was that of Mr Kevin Bailey AM in 2017.

=== Sport ===
Warrane fields teams for all sports of the UNSW Inter-College Sports Shield. The competition is staged over three terms and includes several major sports, such as Soccer, Basketball and Oztag. The competition also includes several carnival days for various sports, including volleyball, cross country, ultimate frisbee and netball. The college has won the Inter College Sport Shield many times, including a ten-year run to 2020.

The college has Sports Scholarships and welcomes elite sportsmen to Warrane, but its main focus is to promote community and participation by sports all-rounders and supporters alike. The culmination of the sports calendar is the final formal dinner of year, when a famous sportsperson is invited to present the year's sports awards.

=== Social life ===
Warrane's Activities Committee organises a wide range of social activities. Traditional events include trivia nights, movies, televised sporting events, beach barbecues, ski trips and bushwalks. The annual social calendar includes harbour cruises and wine and cheese nights organised with colleges from UNSW and other universities in Sydney. The highlight of the college's social calendar is the Warrane College Ball, held annually at an upmarket city hotel or function centre.

=== Cultural activities ===
Residents recognise the rich cultural diversity represented in the college by celebrating national days such as St Patrick's Day, Chinese New Year, Anzac Day with special cuisine and entertainment. Each floor competes annually for the Cultural Cup. The competition includes a scavenger hunt, Band Night, a film festival and Orientation Week activities. Residents also often form a college band and musical performances are a regular feature of birthday celebrations. The Activities Committee organises regular visits to cultural events such as concerts at the Sydney Opera House, exhibitions at Art Galleries and museums and intra-College debating nights.

=== Community Service ===
Warrane organises weekly community service events including visits to nursing homes and homeless people in the Sydney CBD, blood and plasma donations and the annual workcamp. In 2023 the college took a group to Espiritu Santo island in Vanuatu to build a classroom in a school affected by cyclones. In 2024 a team visited Binjari Community in the Northern Territory, near Katherine, for a cultural immersion and to help remove and clear old buildings. In 2025, volunteers from Warrane are travelling to Timor-Leste to rebuild a village school library and basketball court.

== Chapel ==
The Warrane College Chapel is open each day. Regular activities in the chapel include Mass, the weekly meditation by the College Chaplain and an all-night vigil every month.
