= James Darcy Freeman =

Australian cardinal (1907–1991)

His Eminence Sir James Darcy Freeman KBE
- Cardinal, Archbishop of Sydney
- Church: St Mary's Cathedral, Sydney
- Archdiocese: Sydney
- In office: 9 July 1971 – 12 February 1983
- Predecessor: Norman Gilroy
- Successor: Edward Bede Clancy
- Other post: Cardinal-Priest of Santa Maria Regina Pacis a Ostia Lido

Orders
- Ordination: 13 July 1930 by Bartolomeo Cattaneo
- Consecration: 9 December 1956 by Norman Gilroy
- Created cardinal: 5 March 1973 by Paul VI

Personal details
- Born: James Darcy Freeman; 19 November 1907 Annandale, Sydney, New South Wales, Australia
- Died: 16 March 1991 (aged 83) Lewisham, Sydney, New South Wales, Australia
- Buried: Crypt of St Mary's Cathedral, Sydney
- Denomination: Roman Catholic
- Occupation: Prelate
- Education: Sisters of Charity, Elizabeth Bay; St Mary's Cathedral College, Sydney
- Alma mater: St Columba's, Springwood; St Patrick's Seminary, Manly; Pontifical Urban College of Propaganda Fide
- Motto: Per ipsum ipsa duce With Him, under her leadership

Styles of James Freeman
- Reference style: His Eminence
- Spoken style: Your Eminence
- Informal style: Cardinal
- See: Sydney

Sir James Darcy Freeman KBE (19 November 1907 – 16 March 1991) was an Australian cardinal of the Roman Catholic Church. Freeman was the sixth Roman Catholic Archbishop of Sydney and Cardinal-Priest of Santa Maria Regina Pacis a Ostia Lido. He was ordained a priest of the Sydney archdiocese on 13 July 1930, appointed Auxiliary Bishop of Sydney on 9 December 1956 and ordained Titular Bishop of Hermopolis. In 1973, he was elevated to the cardinalate.

== Early life and priesthood ==
Freeman was born on 19 November 1907 in Annandale, to Robert Freeman, a tramway driver, and his wife Margaret Smith. He was educated at the Sisters of Charity, Elizabeth Bay and St Mary's Cathedral College, Sydney, where he was regarded as a good student who enjoyed literature, music and sport.

He attended seminary at St Columba's Springwood and St Patrick's Seminary, Manly; and furthered his studies at the Pontifical Urban College of Propaganda Fide, Rome. He was ordained on 13 July 1930 by Archbishop Bartolomeo Cattaneo and incardinated in the Archdiocese of Sydney.

He served as an assistant priest in Grafton, Murwillumbah, Strathfield, Mosman and at St Mary's Cathedral. From 1941 – 1946 he became the private secretary to the archbishop and chaplain to the Christian Brothers College of St Patrick's College, Strathfield. He also served as administrator of Haymarket parish and parish priest of Stanmore.

== Episcopate ==
Freeman was elected in partibus infidelium as Bishop of Hermopolis and auxiliary of Sydney on 9 December 1956. He was consecrated on 24 January 1957 at St Mary's Cathedral by Cardinal Norman Gilroy and spent 12 years as a loyal auxiliary to the man he has served as secretary. In October 1969 he was appointed Bishop of Armidale for three years after the death of Bishop Doody in 1968. He led the celebrations of the centenary of the Armidale diocese, 1869 to 1969.

On the retirement of Cardinal Gilroy in July 1971, Freeman's appointment as Archbishop of Sydney was announced.

Freeman participated in the elections of Pope John Paul I and Pope John Paul II in Rome in 1978.

== Cardinalate and character ==
On 5 March 1973, Freeman was appointed Cardinal Priest of the Title of Our Lady of Peace of Ostia by Pope Paul VI. He was appointed a Knight Commander of the Order of the British Empire (KBE) in 1977.

In May 2016, to mark the 25th anniversary of his death, his former secretary, Peter Ingham, preached at an anniversary Mass, recalling "the widespread honour, affection and respect with which he was held in the communities where he was known." He further recalled that he sometimes called him "'the reluctant cardinal' – he never sought honours yet they came to him anyway."

== Retirement and death ==
Freeman retired as Archbishop of Sydney on 12 February 1983, to St John Vianney Villa, Randwick. He died on 16 March 1991 at St Vincent's Hospital, Sydney, at the age of 83 and was buried in the crypt of St Mary's Cathedral.

== Legacy ==
Freeman is the patron of the Freeman Catholic College at Bonnyrigg Heights, which opened in 1985 and has a student population of 1,220 and a teaching and support staff of 114. In 1987, the Cardinal Freeman Centre was established at Granville as part of the St Vincent de Paul Society to provide accommodation and support for the homeless men in the western suburbs of Sydney who have been affected by drug and alcohol-related problems. The Cardinal Freeman Village in Ashfield is a retirement home providing accommodation to 380 people. Freeman House in Armidale, continues in honour of his time and service in the Diocese of Armidale.

Catholic Church titles
| Preceded by Edward Doody | 6th Catholic Bishop of Armidale; 1968–1971 | Succeeded by Henry Kennedy |
| Preceded by Norman Thomas Gilroy | 6th Catholic Archbishop of Sydney; 1971–1983 | Succeeded by Edward Bede Clancy |
