= Edward Clancy (cardinal) =

Australian cardinal (1923–2014)

His Eminence Edward Clancy AC
- Cardinal, Archbishop of Sydney
- Archdiocese: Roman Catholic Archdiocese of Sydney
- Province: Sydney
- See: Sydney
- Appointed: 12 April 1983
- Installed: 27 April 1983
- Term ended: 26 March 2001
- Predecessor: James Darcy Freeman
- Successor: George Pell
- Other post: Cardinal-Priest of Santa Maria in Vallicella
- Previous posts: Auxiliary Bishop of Sydney (1973–1978); Titular Bishop of Ard Carna (1973–1978); Archbishop of Canberra–Goulburn (1978–1983); President of the Australian Episcopal Conference (1986–2000)

Orders
- Ordination: 23 July 1949 by Norman Thomas Gilroy
- Consecration: 19 January 1974 by James Darcy Freeman
- Created cardinal: 28 June 1988 by Pope John Paul II

Personal details
- Born: Edward Bede Clancy; 13 December 1923 Lithgow, New South Wales, Australia
- Died: 3 August 2014 (aged 90) Randwick, Sydney, Australia
- Denomination: Roman Catholic
- Motto: Fides mundum vincit ("Faith conquers the world")
- Coat of arms: Edward Clancy's coat of arms

Styles of Edward Clancy
- Reference style: His Eminence
- Spoken style: Your Eminence
- Informal style: Cardinal
- See: Sydney (emeritus)

Edward Bede Clancy AC (13 December 1923 – 3 August 2014) was an Australian Catholic bishop and cardinal. He was the seventh Catholic Archbishop of Sydney from 1983 to 2001. He was made Cardinal-Priest of Santa Maria in Vallicella in 1988.

== Early Life and Ordination ==
Clancy was born in Lithgow, New South Wales, on 13 December 1923. He said that he wanted to be a priest from an early age and pretended to celebrate his first Mass while still a child, to the amusement of his brother and sisters. After completing his studies at Marist Brothers College, Parramatta, he was ordained to the priesthood in 1949, on the same day as the future Australian cardinal Edward Cassidy.

== Priest and Bishop ==
In 1953 Clancy earned a Licentiate in Sacred Theology from the Pontifical University of St Thomas Aquinas (Angelicum). Clancy continued his education, eventually earning his doctorate in theology in 1965. He then started as a teacher and later accepting the position of chaplain at the University of Sydney. He also served as the official spokesperson for the archdiocese at this time and became very well known on that basis.

On 19 January 1974, Clancy was consecrated titular Bishop of Árd Carna and Auxiliary Bishop of Sydney.

== Archbishop and Cardinal ==
On 24 November 1978, he was appointed Archbishop of Canberra (and Goulburn).

On 12 February 1983 he was appointed Archbishop of Sydney and on 28 June 1988 he was elevated to Cardinal-Priest of Santa Maria in Vallicella. He also continued his education career throughout this time, becoming the chancellor of the Australian Catholic University in 1992.

A notable event in the life of his tenure was the beatification of Mother Mary MacKillop, conducted at the Royal Randwick Racecourse on January 15, 1995. Pope John Paul II referenced Clancy in his homily when he said: "We are celebrating an extraordinary event in the life of the Church in this land: the beatification of Mother Mary MacKillop, the first Australian formally declared to be among the Blessed in heaven. I rejoice with all of you: with Cardinal Clancy and my Brother Bishops, with the priests, Religious, all of you, lay men and women, families, young people and children, who offer a radiant and authentic sign of the Church's vitality. I give thanks to God for being able to celebrate this Beatification right here on Australian soil." The Pontiff ended his homily by saying: "The Pope for today, Cardinal Clancy for tomorrow. Praise be the Lord!"

Major work on St Mary's Cathedral, Sydney, took place under his episcopacy. In 1999 a substantial new pipe organ was built by Orgues Létourneau Ltée of Montreal, Québec. In the year 2000 the spires of the cathedral were finally completed.

During his term as archbishop the neo-Gothic diocesan seminary of St Patrick's at Manly (founded by Cardinal Patrick Moran in 1889) was closed and the heritage listed building leased to an international hospitality school. A new seminary, the Seminary of the Good Shepherd, was opened in the inner-western Sydney suburb of Homebush.

Clancy was a fellow of Warrane College, University of New South Wales.

== Retirement and Death ==
Clancy retired as Archbishop of Sydney in 2001 and was succeeded by Archbishop George Pell. In the period from 21 October 2003 (when Pell was made cardinal) until Clancy's own 80th birthday on 13 December 2003, there were three Australian cardinal electors (had a papal conclave become necessary); Clancy, Pell and Edward Cassidy.

Clancy's health began to decline after his retirement and he died on 3 August 2014, aged 90, at the Little Sisters of the Poor nursing home in the Sydney suburb of Randwick.

Catholic Church titles
Preceded by Thomas Cahill	Archbishop of Canberra–Goulburn; 1978–1983	Succeeded by Francis Carroll
Preceded by James Darcy Freeman	Archbishop of Sydney; 1983–2001	Succeeded by George Pell
