= Thomas Muldoon =

Australian Catholic bishop (1917–1986)

The Most Reverend Thomas Muldoon
- Auxiliary bishop of Archdiocese of Sydney
- Archdiocese: Sydney
- Installed: 8 May 1960
- Term ended: 6 September 1982
- Other post: Titular Bishop of Fesseë (1960–1986)

Orders
- Ordination: 22 December 1941 at Propaganda Fide College Chapel, Rome by Pietro Fumasoni Biondi
- Consecration: 8 May 1960 at St. Peter's Basilica, Rome by Pope John XXIII

Personal details
- Born: Thomas William Earle Muldoon; 27 September 1917 Lismore, New South Wales, Australia
- Died: 13 January 1986 (aged 68) North Sydney, New South Wales, Australia
- Buried: Lismore, New South Wales, Australia
- Denomination: Catholic Church
- Occupation: Catholic bishop

Thomas William Earle Muldoon (27 September 1917 – 13 January 1986) was an Australian bishop of the Catholic Church. He served for more than 20 years as auxiliary bishop of Sydney and was a Council Father of the Second Vatican Council.

== Early life ==
Muldoon was born to Bernard, an Irish-born sawmiller, and Jane, a native Australia. He was the sixth of 10 children. One of his younger brothers, Kevin, would serve for more than 50 years as a Marist priest. He was educated at St Carthage's Primary School, then by the Marist Brothers at St Joseph's High School, Lismore and finally by the Marist Fathers at St John's College, Woodlawn where he was head prefect, an active sportsman and horseman.

He entered St Columba's College, Springwood in March 1936 to begin studies for the priesthood along with two other students from the Diocese of Lismore. One of those student, Desmond Houlihan, died within just a few months of entering the seminary. In 1937, he was sent to the Pontificio Collegio Urbano de Propaganda Fide in Rome to study.

== Priesthood ==
On 22 December 1941, Muldoon was ordained to the priesthood at the Propaganda Fide College Chapel, Rome by Cardinal Pietro Fumasoni Biondi alongside the future Cardinal James Knox. He remained in Rome to complete a Doctorate of Divinity and returned to Lismore in 1944.

His first assignment upon returning to Lismore was as assistant priest at St Carthage's Cathedral, Lismore.

In 1945, he was appointed to teach at St Patrick's Seminary, Manly. In 1954, he was appointed dean of the college when St Patrick's Seminary was raised to the status of a pontifical faculty of theology. He was also appointed professor of dogmatic theology in the faculty.

== Episcopate ==
On 1 March 1960, Muldoon was appointed auxiliary bishop of Sydney and given the titular see of Fesseë. He was ordained a bishop on 8 May 1960 in St Peter's Basilica, Rome by Pope John XXIII. It was the first time the Archdiocese had three auxiliary bishops.

He was also appointed parish priest of Mosman, where he would serve until his retirement in 1983, a year after retiring as an auxiliary bishop.

Muldoon participated in the Second Vatican Council and made headlines during the second session in December 1963 when he clashed with other bishops over the relationship of the Church with Protestants. He had been rebuked when he referred to the "tearful and tedious laments" of some bishops who acknowledged the deplorable behaviour of some in the Church during the Reformation.

In 1981, Muldoon publicly attacked the Wran Labor Government for wanting to turn the Mater Misericordiae Hospital into a geriatric facility, threatening to use parishes in selected electorates to throw out the government at the next election.

Despite being viewed as a traditionalist, Muldoon was openly hostile towards people like Archbishop Marcel Lefebvre who he saw as being disloyal to the authority of the Church.

== Retirement and Death ==
Muldoon retired as auxiliary bishop on 6 September 1982. He was buried in East Lismore General Cemetery. He had spent three weeks in hospital in July 1982 following a heart attack. He retired from all parish duties a year later on 12 September 1983.

He died in the Mater Misericordiae Hospital on 13 January 1986 at the age of 68 of cancer. He was buried in East Lismore General Cemetery.

Catholic Church titles
Preceded by —	Auxiliary Bishop of Sydney; 1960–1982	Succeeded by —
Preceded by Léon Théobald Delaere	Titular Bishop of Fesseë; 1960–1986	Succeeded by Patrick Dunn
