= John Carroll (Australian bishop) =

Irish-born Australian Bishop of Lismore (1865–1949)

The Most Reverend John Joseph Carroll
- Bishop of Diocese of Lismore
- Diocese: Lismore
- Installed: 6 March 1910
- Term ended: 8 May 1949
- Predecessor: Jeremiah Joseph Doyle
- Successor: Patrick Joseph Farrelly

Orders
- Ordination: 31 May 1890 at St Patrick's College Chapel, Carlow by Michael Comerford
- Consecration: 6 March 1910 at St Carthage's Cathedral, Lismore by Patrick Francis Moran

Personal details
- Born: John Joseph Carroll; 23 December 1865 Piltown, County Kilkenny, Ireland
- Died: 8 May 1949 (aged 83) Brisbane, Queensland, Australia
- Buried: St Carthage's Cathedral, Lismore, New South Wales Australia
- Denomination: Catholic Church
- Occupation: Catholic bishop
- Education: St Patrick's, Carlow College
- Motto: In fide et in bello fortis (Strong in both faith and war)

John Joseph Carroll DD (23 December 1865 — 8 May 1949) was an Irish-born priest who served as Bishop of the Roman Catholic Diocese of Lismore in Australia, for 39 years.

== Early life ==
Carroll was born in Bresnor, Piltown, Co. Kilkenny, Ireland, in 1865. He was educated at Mount Melleray Abbey Seminary Co. Waterford, and St. Patrick's, Carlow Diocesan College from 1886 to 1890.

== Priesthood ==
Carroll was ordained a priest for the Archdiocese of Sydney on 31 May 1890 at St Patrick's College Chapel, Carlow by Bishop Michael Comerford, Coadjutor Bishop of Kildare and Leighlin.

He arrived in Australia in October and was immediately appointed to Cooma, then part of the Archdiocese of Sydney. In March 1891, he returned to Sydney to assist at St Benedict's Church, Broadway. He spent nearly two years there before serving at St Mary's Cathedral, Sydney, where he was made administrator in 1895. In February 1896, he was appointed administrator of St Benedict's Church, Broadway.

In 1903, he was appointed administrator of Moss Vale where he set about building a new presbytery. He was made parish priest in 1905 and served there for five more years until his raising to the episcopate.

== Episcopate ==
Following the death of Bishop Jeremiah Joseph Doyle of Lismore on 4 June 1909, Carroll emerged as a favourite candidate to replace him. Among the other candidates nominated by the priests of the Diocese of Lismore were Patrick Augustine Sheehan and Father Thomas Hayden of St Patrick's Seminary, Manly. At the time, Carroll was "said to be a man of fine intellect and culture, of dignified personality, a devoted priest, a splendid organiser, and a most assiduous worker."

Carroll was appointed Bishop of Lismore on 2 December 1909, although it wasn't until early 1910 the appointment became public knowledge in Australia. He was consecrated as the second Bishop of Lismore by Cardinal Moran on 6 March 1910. Cardinal Moran had made the arduous trip from Sydney to perform the ceremony despite being nearly 80 years of age.

He immediately set about building a bell tower for the cathedral, which was completed in June 1911. In 1914, he went to Rome for an ad limina visit, also visiting the Holy Lands and Ireland.

Construction on the cathedral, which had been begun by his predecessor, was finally completed on 15 August 1919, when it was consecrated by the Apostolic Delegate, Archbishop Bartolomeo Cattaneo. During his episcopate, the size of the clergy in the diocese rapidly grew too, as did the number of presbyteries, convents, schools and other Catholic institutions

In 1921, St Vincent's Hospital in Lismore was founded and run the Sisters of Charity of Australia.

The future Cardinal Norman Thomas Gilroy served Carroll as his secretary from 1930 to 1934. Gilroy had entered the seminary under Carroll's episcopate and served under him for 11 years as a priest. Carroll was alive when Gilroy was raised to the cardinalate.

Carroll invited the Marist Fathers from New Zealand to build and staff a college for boys, St John's College, Woodlawn, just outside Lismore, which was opened in 1931 and named after Saint John the Evangelist. Pope Pius XI had given Carroll a personal donation to assist with building the college.

On 28 April 1931, Patrick Joseph Farrelly was appointed Coadjutor Bishop of Lismore to assist Carroll who had turned 65 the year previously.

In 1935, on the occasion of his episcopal silver jubilee, he was made an assistant at the Pontifical throne by Pope Pius XI.

== Death ==
For the last few years of his life, he had left the active administration of the diocese to his Coadjutor Bishop, Farrelly, though remained formally the Bishop of Lismore. In 1947, he left Lismore and moved to live with the Redemptorists in Brisbane due to needing ongoing care.

In late in March 1949, he was admitted to hospital to undergo a serious operation but had remained there for two months, contracting pneumonia in early May. He died on 8 May 1949.

Catholic Church titles
Preceded by Jeremiah Joseph Doyle	Bishop of Lismore; 1910–1949	Succeeded by Patrick Joseph Farrelly
