= Geoffrey Jarrett =

Retired Australian Roman Catholic bishop)

The Most Reverend Geoffrey Jarrett
- Bishop Emeritus of Lismore
- Church: Catholic Church
- Diocese: Diocese of Lismore
- In office: 1 December 2001 – 20 December 2016
- Predecessor: John Steven Satterthwaite
- Successor: Greg Homeming
- Previous posts: Apostolic Administrator of Brisbane (2011-2012); Coadjutor Bishop of Lismore (2000-2001)

Orders
- Ordination: 14 May 1970 by Guilford Clyde Young
- Consecration: 22 February 2001 by Edward Clancy

Personal details
- Born: Geoffrey Hylton Jarrett; 1 December 1937 (age 88) Kyneton, Victoria, Australia
- Denomination: Roman Catholicism
- Occupation: Bishop

Geoffrey Hylton Jarrett (born 1 December 1937) is a retired Australian Roman Catholic bishop who was bishop of the Roman Catholic Diocese of Lismore.

== Early life ==
Jarrett was born in Kyneton, Victoria on 1 December 1937, the eldest son of Hylton and Beatrice Jarrett. His father's side had been a pioneering English family in the district and his mother's family had descended from a German Lutheran family from Prussia who had migrated to Melbourne in the 1840s. He spent a lot of his childhood in Papua New Guinea, where his father was a mining engineer and later, a copra and coffee producer. He received his secondary education at Trinity Grammar School in Melbourne.

Intending to proceed to university after matriculating, an opportunity to travel opened wider horizons in London, and he chose to pursue his interest in documentary film-making instead. He worked for several years in the Film Unit of BBC Television at Ealing Studios. During his time there, he began to discern a vocation to Anglican ministry.

He entered the Theological College of the Society of the Sacred Mission at Kelham, Nottinghamshire, where he studied for five years. He returned to Australia to serve as an Anglican priest, working in Queensland.

During his time overseas, against the backdrop of the Second Vatican Council, Jarrett began to feel a calling towards the Catholic Church. He would observe the reverence of Catholics in Westminster Cathedral, London and began to feel drawn to the liturgy and worship. He also became deeply immersed in the Council, reading its documents as they were released. He said Sacrosanctum Concilium had a profound influence on his conversion.

He also said he realised that, as an Anglican, he would not be able to teach crucial Catholic doctrines such as the Real Presence as the truth but only as a personal opinion or interpretation: "to be left an open question, to be taught to some but not to others, to be held by some but not by others".

He was received into the Catholic Church on 9 November 1965.

Following his conversion, he approached Archbishop Guilford Clyde Young, who accepted him as a candidate for the priesthood for the Archdiocese of Hobart. Given his unique background, rather than joining the Diocesan seminary, he was instead sent to complete his formation at the Marists seminary in Toongabbie, New South Wales.

== Priesthood ==
Jarrett was ordained a priest for the Archdiocese of Hobart on 14 May 1970 by Archbishop Guilford Clyde Young.

He served in various parishes across the Archdiocese, including as Administrator of St Mary's Cathedral, Hobart. He also served as a chaplain within the University of Tasmania and Catholic Women's League.

In November 1987, Jarrett celebrated a Tridentine Mass at St Mary's Cathedral, Hobart. He advocated for the Latin Mass as both a treasure of antiquity and revelation for the youth of Tasmania and cited Sacrosanctum Concilium's treasuring of Gregorian chant and the tradition of sacred music. He was, however, critical of the Society of Saint Pius X, which had established itself in Australia in 1983, describing them as a "divisive movement, characterized by real bitterness".

He served as chairman of the Australian Confraternity of Catholic Clergy, an organisation noted for its strong support for the Holy Father and Church teachings, from 1995 to 1999.

== Episcopate ==
On 9 December 2000, Jarrett was appointed Coadjutor Bishop of Diocese of Lismore by Pope John Paul II. He was consecrated on 22 February 2001 at St Carthage's Cathedral, Lismore by Cardinal Edward Bede Clancy. He succeeded Bishop John Steven Satterthwaite as Bishop of Lismore on 1 December 2001 and was formally installed on 12 December 2001. He became just the second Tasmanian priest to be made a bishop in Australia.

At the turn of the century, Jarrett was given the task of overseeing more than 100,000 Catholics, in an environment of decreasing religiosity. The Diocese had traditionally been underpinned by old Irish solidarity, however this had almost completely vanished by the turn of the century, reducing the number of Catholics regularly attending Sunday Mass and receiving the sacraments. The number of enrolments in Catholic schools was climbing however, with a big increase in the number of non-Catholic enrolments. Jarrett made the formation of teachers and principals one of his key focuses.

He also sought to increase the number of vocations in the Diocese, encouraging local men to discern the priesthood but also bringing in foreign seminarians to ensure there would be enough priests. He also strongly believed in the liturgy as the source and summit of Christian life, recognising the Church's tradition of worshiping "in the beauty of holiness". In one of his final acts, he led a restoration effort for St Carthage's Cathedral, which included a new altar, in order to preserve its history.

Jarrett, drawing on his Anglican background, played a key role in establishing the Personal Ordinariate of Our Lady of the Southern Cross, which was created to serve former Anglicans entering full communion with the Catholic Church in Australia and the Asia-Pacific region.

In 2011, Jarrett was appointed Apostolic Administrator of the Archdiocese of Brisbane following the resignation of Archbishop John Bathersby.

In May 2014, Jarrett expressed his desire to see a return of the traditional Friday abstinence from meat. In 1985, the Australian bishops had declared that Friday penance could be fulfilled by prayer, self-denial or helping others, however Jarret said the reality was only a small number of Catholics actually fulfilled this. "It has been difficult for priests to preach it when it remains only a principle with no uniform discipline attached to it," he said. He described Friday abstinence as "an ancient and universal practice for Catholics deeply ingrained in our identity with Christ and the church".

== Retirement ==
Pope Francis accepted his age-related resignation on 20 December 2016. He was succeeded by Greg Homeming on 22 February 2017.

In 2019, Jarrett ordained Fr Kopel Gibuma as a priest for the Personal Ordinariate of Our Lady of the Southern Cross, becoming the first ordination of a Torres Strait Islander to the priesthood.

In retirement, he has enjoyed a close connection with many Traditional Latin Mass communities in Australia. In 2024, he ordained the first priest from traditional Benedictine Notre Dame Priory in Colebrook. He has also conferred the Sacrament of Confirmation in order Latin Mass communities.

As of 2026, he was still assisting parishes across Australia with the Sacrament of Confirmation.
