= Patrick Farrelly (bishop) =

Australian Catholic bishop (1895–1974

The Most Reverend Patrick Farrelly
- Bishop Emeritus of Diocese of Lismore
- Diocese: Lismore
- Installed: 8 May 1949
- Term ended: 1 September 1971
- Predecessor: John Joseph Carroll
- Successor: Douglas Joseph Warren

Orders
- Ordination: 1 December 1918 at St Carthage's Cathedral, Lismore by John Joseph Carroll
- Consecration: 30 August 1931 at St Carthage's Cathedral, Lismore by Bartolomeo Cattaneo

Personal details
- Born: Patrick Joseph Farrelly; 19 December 1895 Lismore, New South Wales, Australia
- Died: 25 May 1974 (aged 78) Lismore, New South Wales, Australia
- Denomination: Catholic Church
- Occupation: Catholic bishop

Patrick Joseph Farrelly (19 December 1895 – 25 May 1974) was an Australian bishop of the Catholic Church. He served as Bishop of Lismore and was the first native-born priest to hold episcopal office in the diocese.

== Early life ==
Farrelly was born and raised in Lismore, the second son of Patrick and Hannah Farrelly. He was educated at St Carthage's Primary School by the Presentation Sisters. His brother, Thomas, also became a priest for the Diocese of Lismore and was given the title of monsignor. He pursued studies for the priesthood at St Columba's College, Springwood and St Patrick's Seminary, Manly

== Priesthood ==
Farrelly was ordained on 1 December 1918 at St Carthage's Cathedral by Bishop John Joseph Carroll.

His first appointment was at Kempsey before moving to Smithtown. He was then appointed to Port Macquarie, followed by Lismore. He was then appointed parish priest of Bellingen, his final appointment before being elevated to the episcopacy.

== Episcopate ==
On 28 April 1931, Farrelly was appointed Coadjutor Bishop of Lismore. He was ordained as a bishop on 30 August 1931 at St Carthage's Cathedral by Archbishop Bartolomeo Cattaneo.

Despite not being officially made Bishop of Lismore, Farrelly took over full-time administration of the diocese in 1947 when Bishop Carroll moved to live with the Redemptorist Fathers in Mitchelton, Brisbane due to ill-health. On 8 May 1949, he became Bishop of Lismore following the death of Carroll.

His episcopacy was defined by his energy and gifted speaking. He grew the diocese's infrastructure, establishing St Paul's College, Kempsey and opening several churches.

== Retirement and Death ==
On 1 September 1971, Farrelly retired as Bishop of Lismore, having reached the canonical retirement age of 75 almost a year earlier. He died on 25 May 1974 in Lismore and was buried in front of the Cathedral beneath a statue of Our Lady of Lourdes.

Catholic Church titles
Preceded by John Joseph Carroll	Bishop of Lismore; 1949–1971	Succeeded by John Steven Satterthwaite
Preceded by Giovanni Rossi	Titular Bishop of Neve (Nebo); 1931–1949	Succeeded by William John Conway
