= John Steven Satterthwaite =

Australian bishop (1928–2016)

- Bishop of Lismore
- Church: Catholic Church
- Diocese: Diocese of Lismore
- In office: 1 September 1971 – 1 December 2001
- Predecessor: Patrick Farrelly
- Successor: Geoffrey Jarrett
- Previous posts: Titular Bishop of Thignica (1969-1971); Coadjutor Bishop of Lismore (1969-1971)

Orders
- Ordination: 16 March 1957 by Luigi Traglia
- Consecration: 1 May 1969 by Norman Gilroy

Personal details
- Born: 11 August 1928 Randwick, Sydney, New South Wales, Australia
- Died: 23 April 2016 (aged 87)

John Steven Satterthwaite (11 August 1928 – 23 April 2016) was an Australian bishop in the Catholic Church who served a Bishop of Lismore for more than three decades through the late 20th century.

== Early life ==
Satterthwaite was at Nurse Nettleton's Private Hospital, Waverley in Sydney on 11 August 1928. He was the second of three children born to Favel Thomas Satterthwaite and his wife Mabel Isobel Stevens. The pair were married in 1925 in the Chapel of St John's College, University of Sydney.

His older sister Patricia Mary became a religious sister with the Sisters of the Good Samaritan, entering in 1951, taking the name Sr Scholastica and receiving the habit in 1952.

Satterthwaite was educated at Ashford State School before moving to St Joseph's College, Hunters Hill where he was educated by the Marist Brothers. In 1945, he achieved the "best possible" pass in his leaving certificate. He graduated in engineering at Sydney University while residing at St John's College. He worked as a junior engineer at Australian Iron and Steel, Port Kembla. He entered St Columba's College, Springwood in 1951 as a student for the Diocese of Armidale after being accepted by Bishop Edward John Doody. He was sent to Rome in 1953 to continue his studies for the priesthood, studying at the Pontifical Lateran University.

== Priesthood ==
Satterthwaite was ordained to the priesthood in Rome on 16 March 1957 by Archbishop Luigi Traglia. He remained in Rome following his ordination, studying at the Pontifical Irish College and becoming a Doctor of Divinity.

He returned to Australia in 1958 and was assigned to assist at the parish of Boggabri. He then became assistant at Glen Innes. In 1962, he became secretary to Bishop Edward John Doody and Diocesan Chancellor. He was also given the responsibility of being rector of St Mary’s Minor Seminary.

== Episcopate ==
On 6 March 1969, Pope Paul VI appointed Satterthwaite as coadjutor bishop of the Roman Catholic Diocese of Lismore and Titular Bishop of Thignica. He was consecrated bishop on 1 May 1969 at St Carthage's Cathedral, Lismore by Cardinal Norman Thomas Gilroy and succeeded Bishop Patrick Joseph Farrelly on 1 September 1971.

The thirty years of Bishop Satterthwaite’s episcopate followed upon the social turmoil of the 1960’s as well as being a time of considerable change following the Second Vatican Council.

The population of the diocese exceeded 72,000 Catholics spread across 30 parishes and he sought a reassessment of the pastoral need of the Diocese. He gave himself a demanding programme of parish visitations and ensured close oversight of existing ecclesial structures, diocesan, parochial and lay. He established a Diocesan Pastoral Council and the Council of Priests. He also established a diocesan pastoral plan which led to the erection of new parishes and the amalgamation of others.

The increasing work of lay teachers in the Catholic schooling system led him to reorganise the Catholic Schools Office, while strengthening the Catholic mission and identity of the schools, through close cooperation between parish priests, school principals and key lay staff. He also appointed an Episcopal Vicar for Education, and of a lay Director of the Schools Office.

In 1977, he initiated a rearrangement and extension of St Carthage's Cathedral to allow for a more appropriate celebration of the Mass in accordance with the liturgical reforms of the 1960s. He made the Cathedral the centre of his pastoral ministry and would often spend early hours of the day in there before the Blessed Sacrament.

He also made great strides in the charitable work of the Diocese. St Vincent’s Private Hospital, Lismore, St Joseph’s Cowper Children’s Home and two Homes for the aged came under diocesan management during his episcopate. He also encouraged parishes to provide their own care for the aged and support the work of the St Vincent’s Private Hospital, Lismore and Society of Saint Vincent de Paul.

During his episcopate, he ordained 45 new priests.

== Retirement and death ==
Like his predecessor, Satterthwaite sought a Coadjutor Bishop to assist him with the vast Diocese following nearly 30 years of episcopal ministry. Tasmanian priest Geoffrey Jarrett was appointed his Coadjutor on 9 December 2000. Satterthwaite resigned on 1 December 2001, two years short of his mandatory retirement age and was succeeded by Jarrett.

For 15 years in retirement, he assisted in the pastoral work of Port Macquarie parish.

He died on 23 April 2016 in Port Macquarie at the age of 87. His funeral was held at St Carthage's Cathedral, Lismore and was interred in the East Lismore Cemetery.

His sister, Patricia (Sr Scholastica), died just four weeks later.
