= Jeremiah Doyle =

Irish born Catholic bishop

Jeremiah Joseph Doyle
- Bishop of Lismore
- Church: Catholic Church
- Diocese: Diocese of Lismore
- In office: 13 May 1887 – 4 June 1909
- Predecessor: Diocese erected
- Successor: John Carroll

Orders
- Ordination: 24 June 1874 by John Francis Whelan
- Consecration: 28 August 1887 by Francis Moran

Personal details
- Born: 5 December 1849 Kilmurry (west of Crookstown), County Cork, United Kingdom of Great Britain and Ireland
- Died: 4 June 1909 (aged 59) Lismore, New South Wales, Australia, British Empire

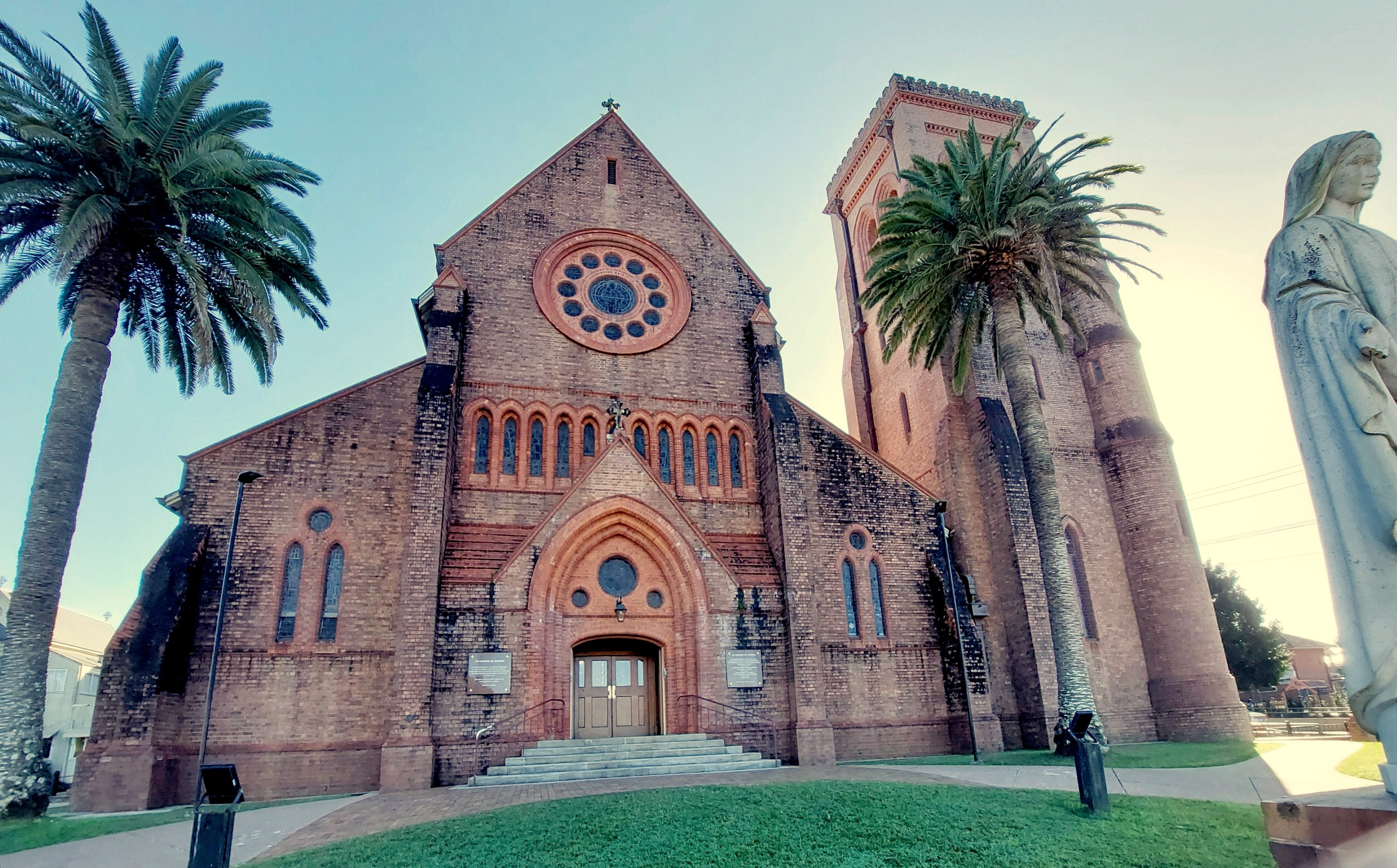
St. Carthage's Cathedral at Lismore, Australia, in August 2024

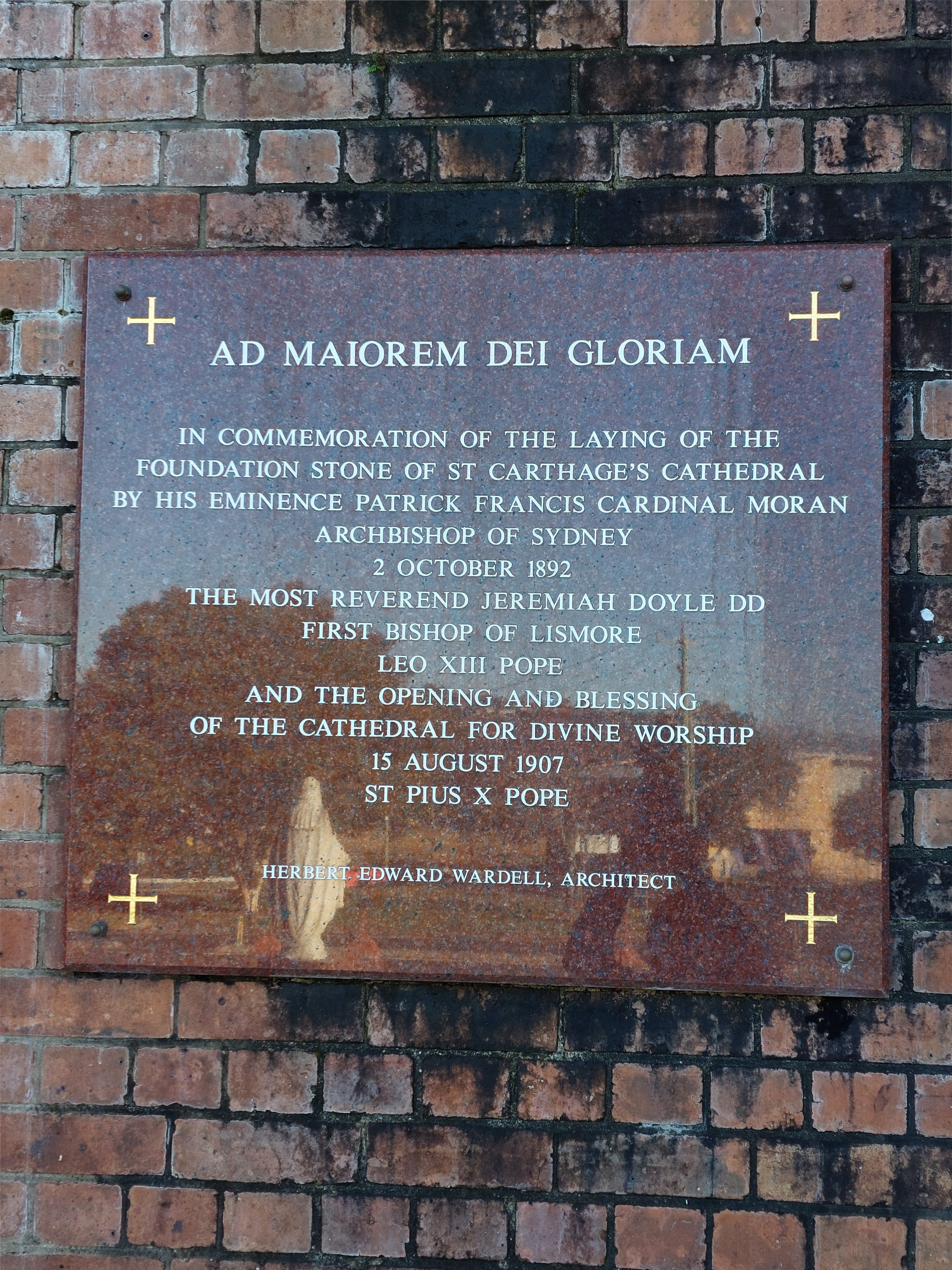
Stone commemorating foundation and completion of St. Carthage's Cathedral, Lismore, Australia

Jeremiah Joseph Doyle (5 December 1849 – 4 June 1909), was an Irish born Catholic bishop, the bishop of Grafton, later renamed the diocese of Lismore in New South Wales, Australia. One of his achievements was lobbying for, and acquiring funds for, the building of St Carthage's Cathedral at Lismore, which was constructed over the period 1892–1907, with the bell tower completed a few years later, after his death.

== Biography ==
Doyle was born at Kilmurry, County Cork, Ireland. He was the son of Daniel Doyle and his wife Ellen (née Murphy). He was educated in classics at Mount Melleray College, Waterford, and in 1868 he entered All Hallows College, Dublin.

Doyle was ordained a priest on 24 June 1874 for the Roman Catholic Diocese of Armidale, New South Wales, Australia.

Doyle was consecrated first Bishop of Grafton (now Lismore) by Cardinal Patrick Francis Moran in St Mary's Cathedral, Sydney, on 28 August 1887.

He lobbied strongly for the building of a Cathedral at Lismore, New South Wales, which was eventually named St Carthage's (after a similarly dedicated Church of Ireland cathedral in Lismore, Ireland) and worked tirelessly to acquire the funds necessary for its construction. The design was by Herbert Wardell of the Sydney firm Wardell and Denning; the foundation stone was laid in 1892 but actual construction did not start until 1905, with the Cathedral dedicated in 1907. The final portion of the building, the bell tower, was not completed until 1911, after Doyle had died.

Doyle remained bishop until he died of cerebral haemorrhage in his house at Lismore, New South Wales, on 4 June 1909.

The diocese of Grafton was renamed to Lismore, and John Carroll became bishop of Lismore on 2 December 1909.
