= Greg Homeming =

Bishop of the Roman Catholic Diocese of Lismore

The Most Reverend Gregory Homeming OCD
- Bishop of Lismore
- Church: Roman Catholic Church
- Diocese: Lismore
- See: Lismore
- Appointed: 20 December 2016
- Installed: 22 February 2017
- Predecessor: Geoffrey Hylton Jarrett

Orders
- Ordination: 20 July 1991
- Consecration: 22 February 2017 by Anthony Fisher

Personal details
- Born: Gregory Paul Homeming; 30 May 1958 (age 68) Sydney, New South Wales, Australia
- Education: University of Divinity; University of Melbourne
- Motto: God alone suffices
- Coat of arms

Gregory Homeming OCD (born 30 May 1958) is the Bishop of the Roman Catholic Diocese of Lismore.

== Early life ==
Homeming was born in Sydney on 30 May 1958 into a Chinese Australian family. His parents are Gus and Irene Homeming.

Homeming was educated in Shepparton, Victoria, before completing his secondary education at St Aloysius' College in Milsons Point. While he attended Catholic schools and went to Church on Sunday, he said he was never overly religious. After graduating high school, he studied for a Bachelor of Economics and Bachelor of Laws at the University of Sydney. He was admitted as a solicitor in 1981 and worked as a lawyer in Sydney for Messrs Allen, Allen & Hemsley until 1985.

In 1983, Homeming visited a friend who had joined the Order of Discalced Carmelites. He said from the moment he walked into the monastery and chapel, he felt a strong calling to join the order. His friend eventually left the order to marry, but at the end of 1985, Homeming joined the Order of Discalced Carmelites and made his first profession on 1 February 1987. He completed his studies for the priesthood at the Yarra Theological Union, Melbourne taking the degrees of Bachelor of Theology from the Melbourne College of Divinity and Master of Arts in Philosophy from the University of Melbourne.

== Priesthood ==
On 20 July 1991, Homeming was ordained a priest for the Order of Discalced Carmelites. His first appointment was serving at the St John of the Cross Priory in Box Hill. By 1995, he was Prior of Mount Carmet Retreat Centre community in Varroville. In 1999, he became the regional vicar for the order in Australia.

When the Discalced Carmelites were given pastoral care of the Parish of St Ives in the Diocese of Broken Bay, Homeming moved to be resident in the parish, while remaining Regional Vicar. During his years as a priest, he also dedicated himself to the ministry of guiding spiritual retreats, and he held the positions of Major Superior, Novice Master, and Retreat Director.

== Episcopate ==
On 20 December 2016, Homeming was appointed Bishop of Lismore by Pope Francis, following the retirement of Bishop Geoffrey Jarrett.

His appointment came as an "unpleasant surprise" given he had never expected to be made a bishop, but said he felt a duty to respond in obedience to the Holy Father's appointment.

He was consecrated a bishop on 22 February 2017 at St Carthage's Cathedral, Lismore by Archbishop Anthony Fisher OP.

In February 2022, Lismore experienced its highest flood on record, as floodwaters reached 14.4 metres. Just a few weeks leater, it was hit with its 6th highest flood on record, devastating the local community. Lismore is one of the most flood-prone urban centres in Australia and, because of its location, has a long history of severe flooding. The flood waters hit St Carthage's Cathedral, trapping Homeming and forcing him to be rescued. The Cathedral is on a hill about two blocks from Wilsons River, and sits well above the highest flood level recorded in the city’s history of about 12.1 metres in 1954 and 1974.

The flood devastated the region, killing five people, leaving 4,000 home uninhabitable and left a lasting impact on the Diocese. Many of its schools were forced to move to alternative locations and some were told they would be uninsurable going forward unless they were rebuilt or relocated. Many residents were displaced and living in temporary accommodation too, even more than a year later. Homeming helped to spearhead an initiative called the Two Room Project, which aimed to get people back into their own homes as quickly as possible. The project was supported by money received from a bishop's appeal.
