= Broadway, Sydney =

Road in Sydney, Australia

Broadway, Sydney New South Wales
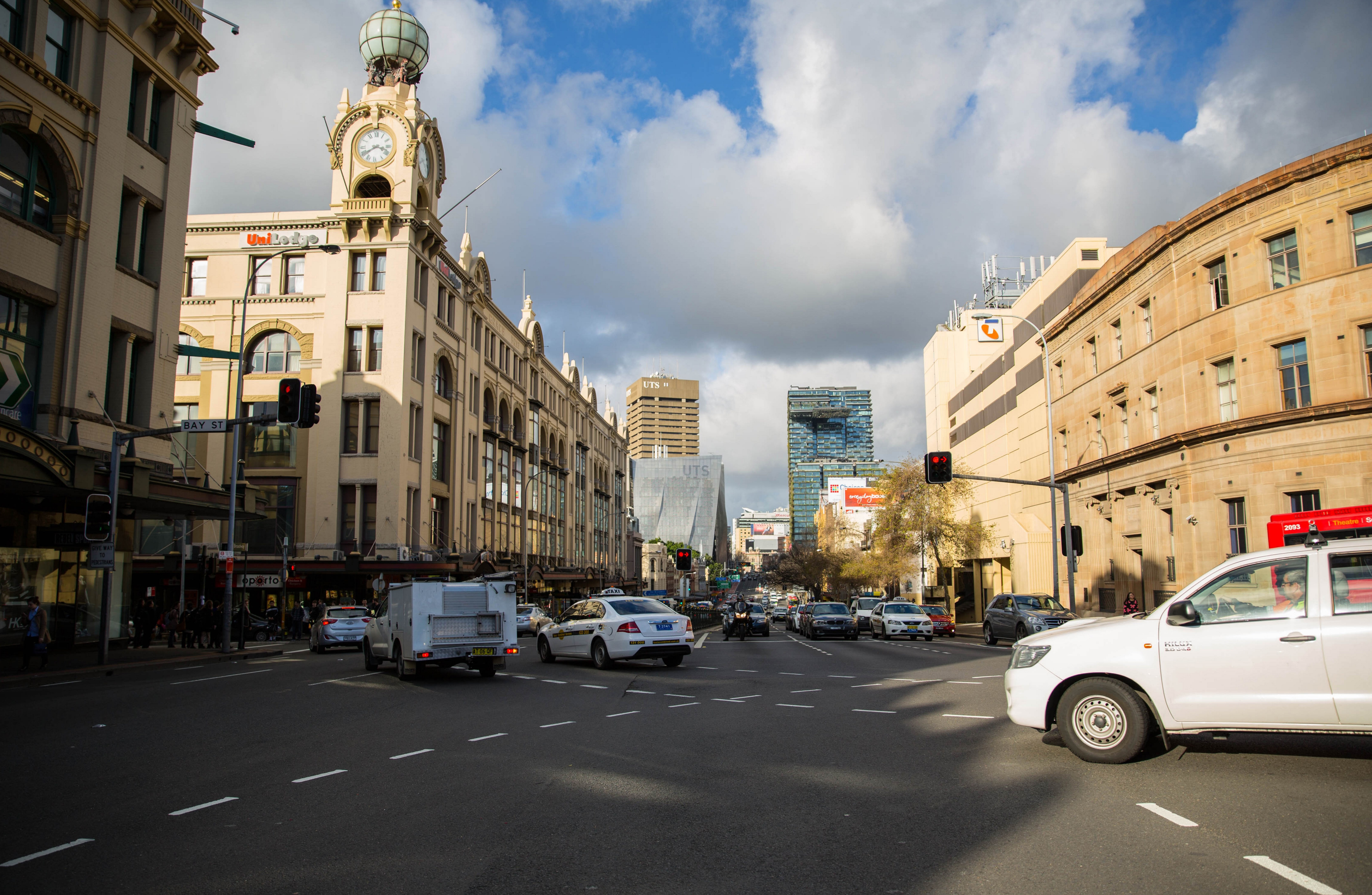
- Northbound from City Road intersection
- Sydney, New South Wales, Australia (Map)

General information
- Type: Street
- Length: 700 m (0.4 mi)
- Route number(s): A22 (2013–present)
- Former route number: State Route 31 (2001–2013); Metroad 5 (1993–2001); National Route 1 (1955–1992)

Major junctions
- West end: Parramatta Road; Chippendale, Sydney
- City Road
- East end: George Street; Ultimo, Sydney

Location(s)
- LGA(s): City of Sydney
- Major suburbs: Chippendale, Ultimo

Highway system
- Highways in Australia; National Highway • Freeways in Australia; Highways in New South Wales

Broadway is a 700-metre (2,300 ft) road in inner city Sydney, New South Wales, Australia. The road constitutes the border between the suburbs of Ultimo (to the north) and Chippendale (to the south). Broadway is also an urban locality.

Broadway connects the south end of George Street where it terminates at the junction with Harris and Regent streets, and runs west to the junction of Parramatta Road and City Road at Victoria Park. Broadway and Parramatta Road are part of the Great Western Highway.

== History ==
Broadway shopfronts, Sydney, 1900

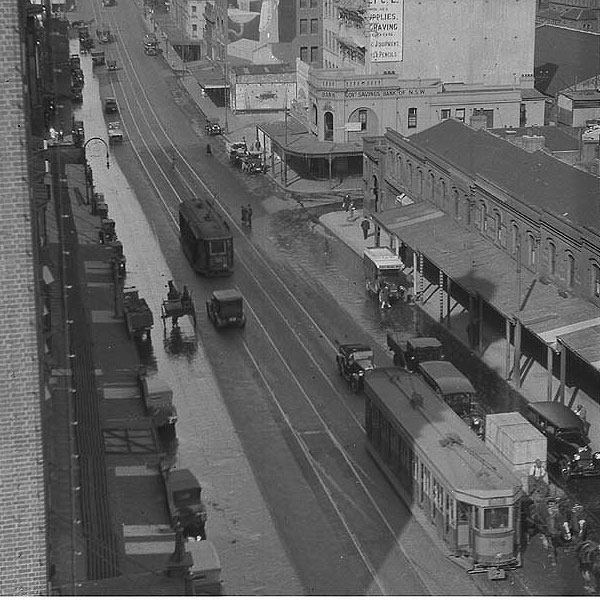
George Street West (Broadway), c. 1930 from the Grace Bros building

Broadway is historically important because it is one of the first roads built in the colony of New South Wales, in 1794. It had been called "George Street South" and then "George Street West". After being widened in 1906 when the Central railway station was built, George Street west of Railway Square, it became colloquially known as "The Broadway". Another widening scheme was devised in 1925, which sought to acquire buildings on the south side of the road. Buildings were gradually acquired and demolished over the next decade, at a cost of over 400,000 pounds. In 1933, the name "Broadway" was formally adopted for the road. The last resumption was settled with St Benedict's Church in 1939, and the building was subsequently remodelled.

In the early nineteenth century, travel to Parramatta on Parramatta Road attracted a toll and this was charged from the area now known as Railway Square. The toll gate was subsequently moved to the approximate junction of the present Broadway and Parramatta Road.

Broadway was once a major retailing centre, and for 90 years was home to the flagship complex of department store chain Grace Bros. The complex consisted of two stores on either side of Bay Street. It was visited by Queen Elizabeth II during her 1954 visit to Australia. Retailing on Broadway declined and the store was eventually closed in 1995. Today this site contains the Broadway Shopping Centre on the western side and the UniLodge on Broadway on the eastern side.

The southern side of the road was dominated by the Carlton & United brewery. The brewery closed in December 2006 and the site was sold on 29 June 2007. The site has been redeveloped into a mixed use precinct called Central Park, which includes a new public park located just off Broadway of approximately 6,500 square metres (70,000 sq ft) in size, and a new tower called One Central Park designed by Jean Nouvel and featuring "vertical gardens" by Patrick Blanc. Located opposite the University of Technology Sydney, One Central Park is an apartment complex with a shopping centre called Central located on the lower levels.

In 2010, the Roads & Traffic Authority proposed to widen Broadway by one lane, requiring reduction in the footpath width.

== Transport ==
Broadway was a busy tram thoroughfare in the first half of the 20th century, until the line's closure in 1958. A tram stop was built at the Mountain Street intersection in 1933. A major tram accident opposite the Grace Bros department store occurred in 1943, resulting in 50 injured passengers. Since then it has been the primary entry point into the central business district for bus services from the Inner West currently operated by Transit Systems.

== Education ==
A number of educational institutions are located on or around Broadway. These include the International Grammar School (IGS), University of Technology, Sydney (UTS), University of Notre Dame, University of Sydney and the Sydney Institute of TAFE.

UTS has a particularly strong presence. The UTS Tower is the tallest structure on Broadway and is a Sydney landmark. Designed in the brutalist style, it has been described as one of Sydney's ugliest buildings. An adjacent building on Broadway designed by Denton Corker Marshall was completed in 2014. There are also plans to redesign the podium of the tower.

The University of Notre Dame opened its Broadway campus in 2006, on the site of the St Benedict's Church. The church is the oldest consecrated Catholic Church in Australia. It was the parish church of Norman Gilroy, the first Australian to become a cardinal.

== Other buildings ==
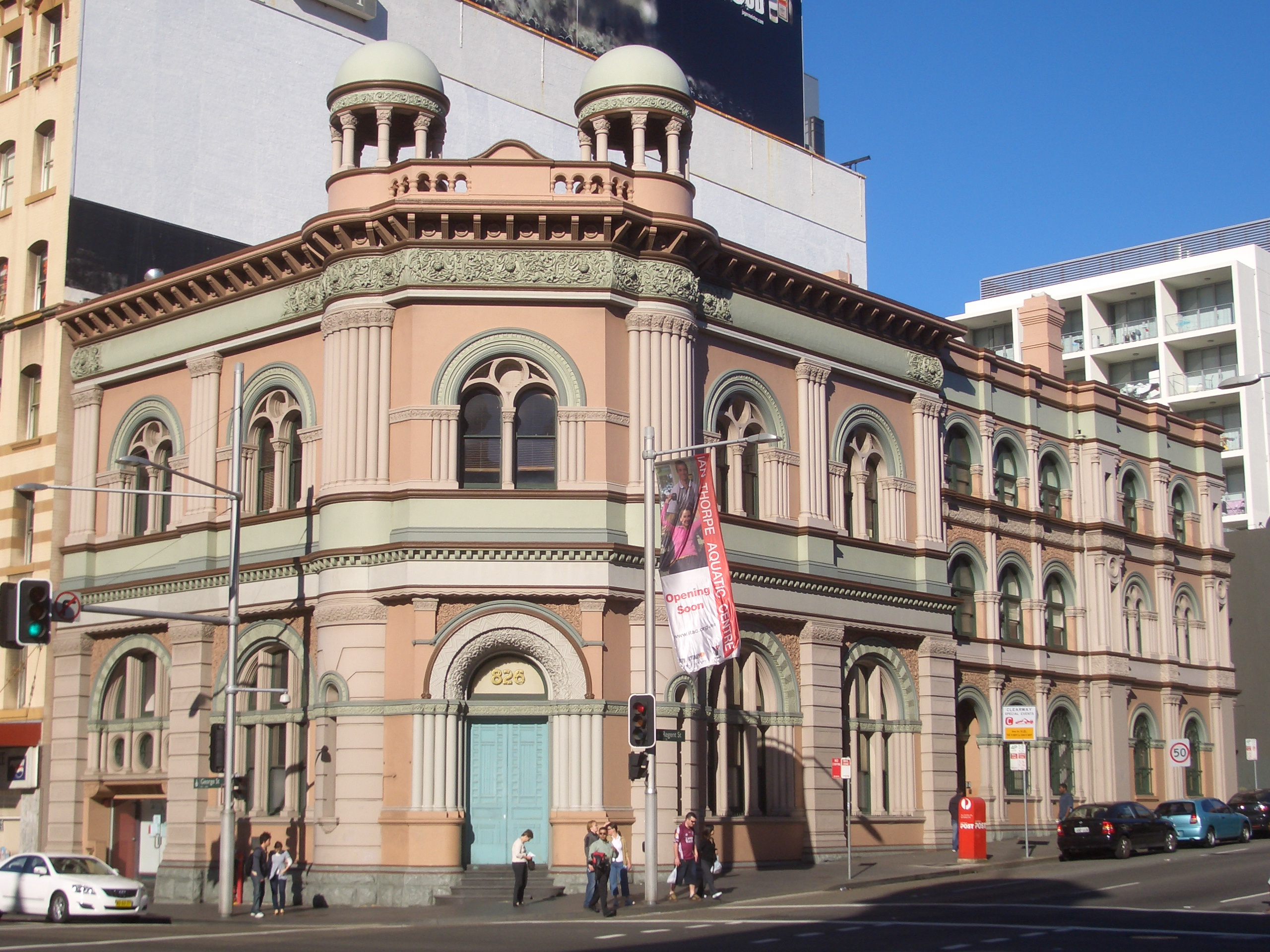
The Embassy Conference Centre is a historic building, built in the 1890s as the first branch of the Bank of New South Wales.

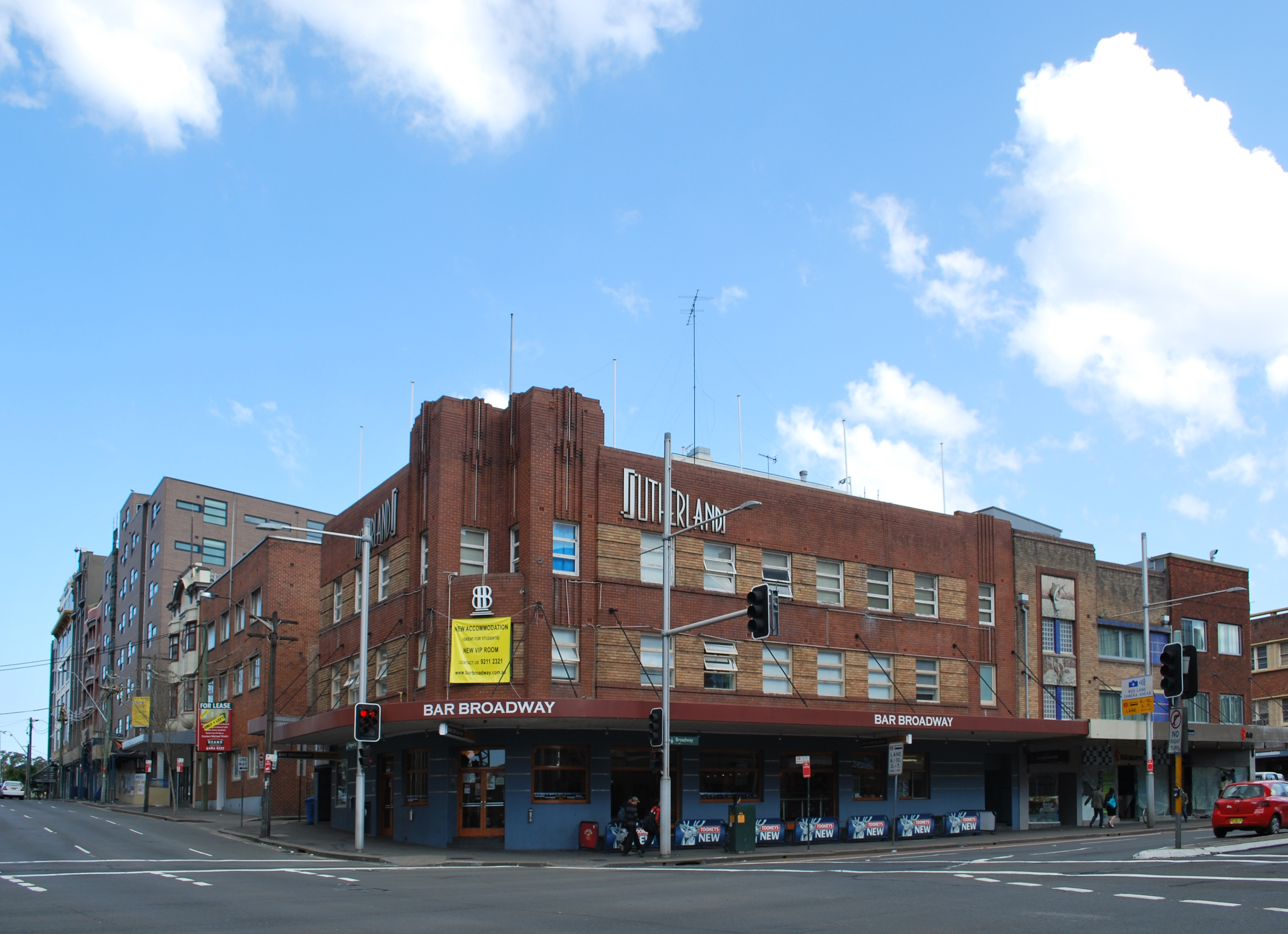
Bar Broadway

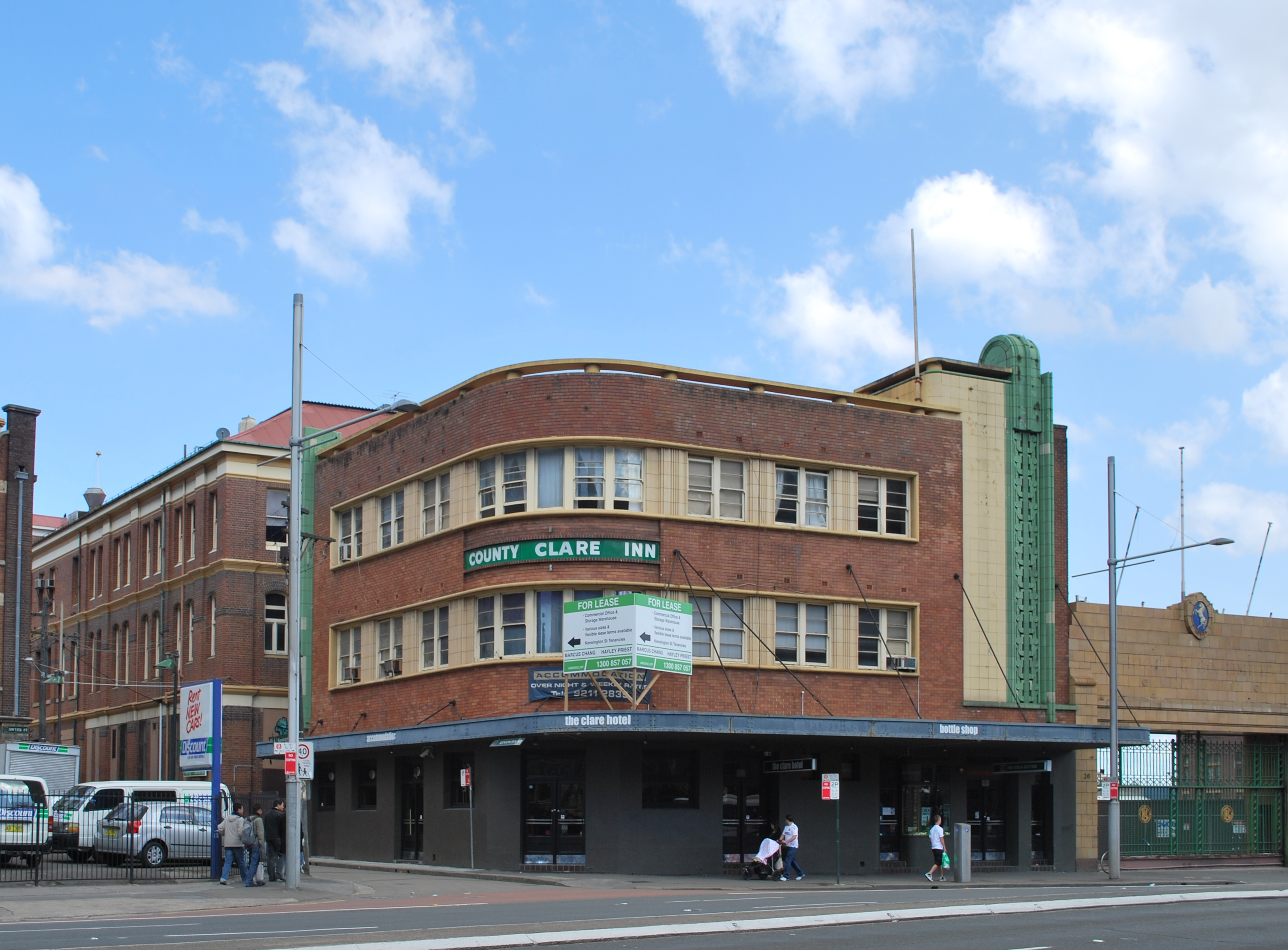
The Clare Hotel

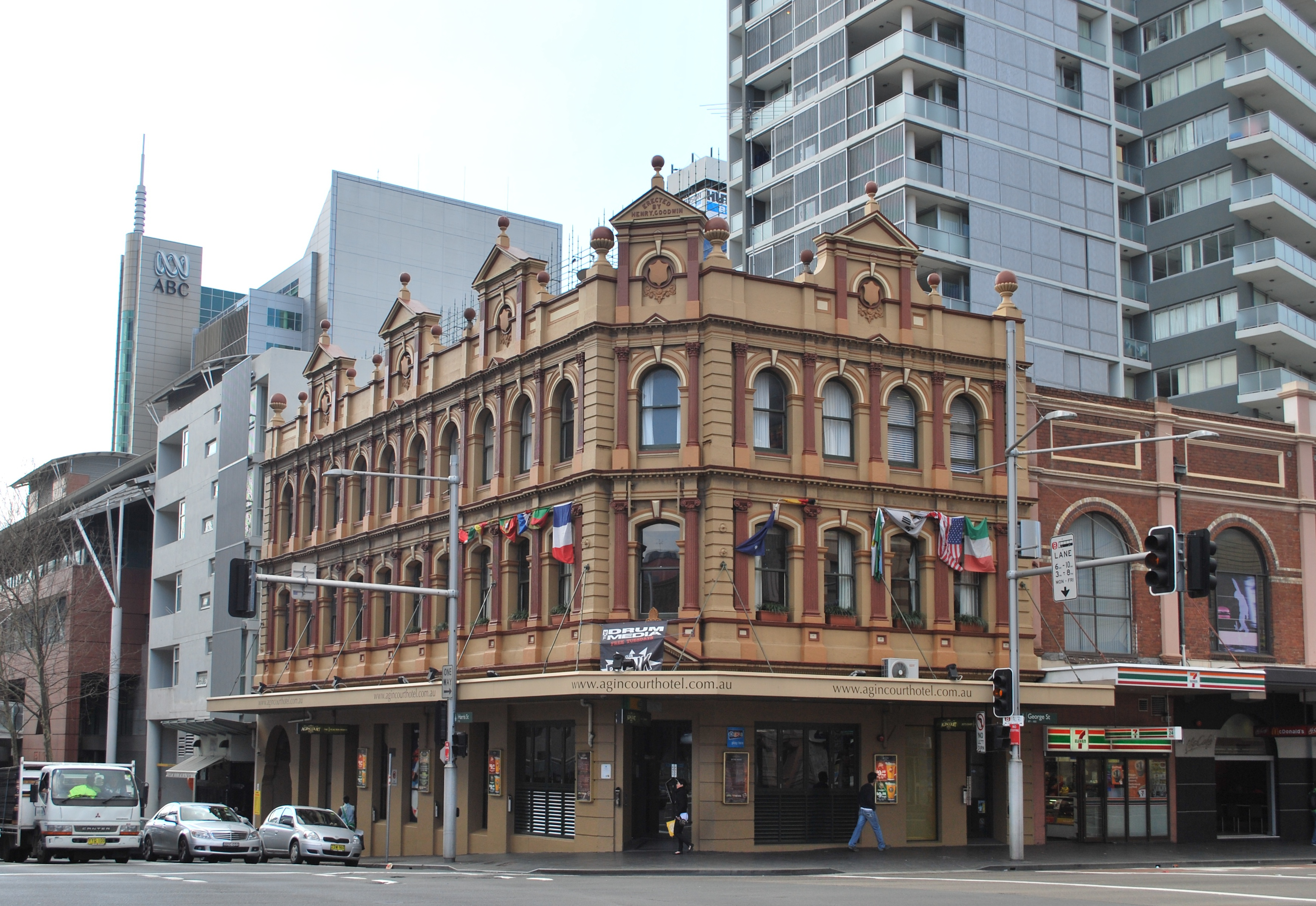
Agincourt Hotel

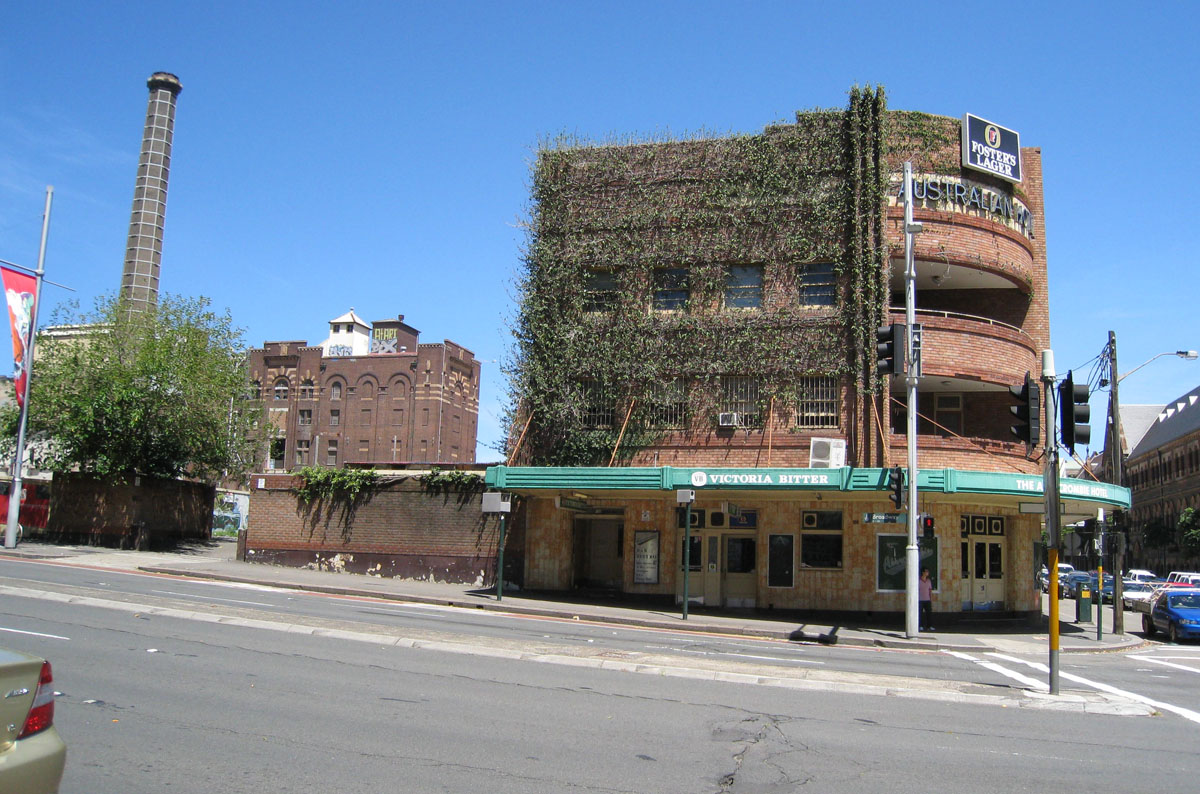
Abercrombie Hotel

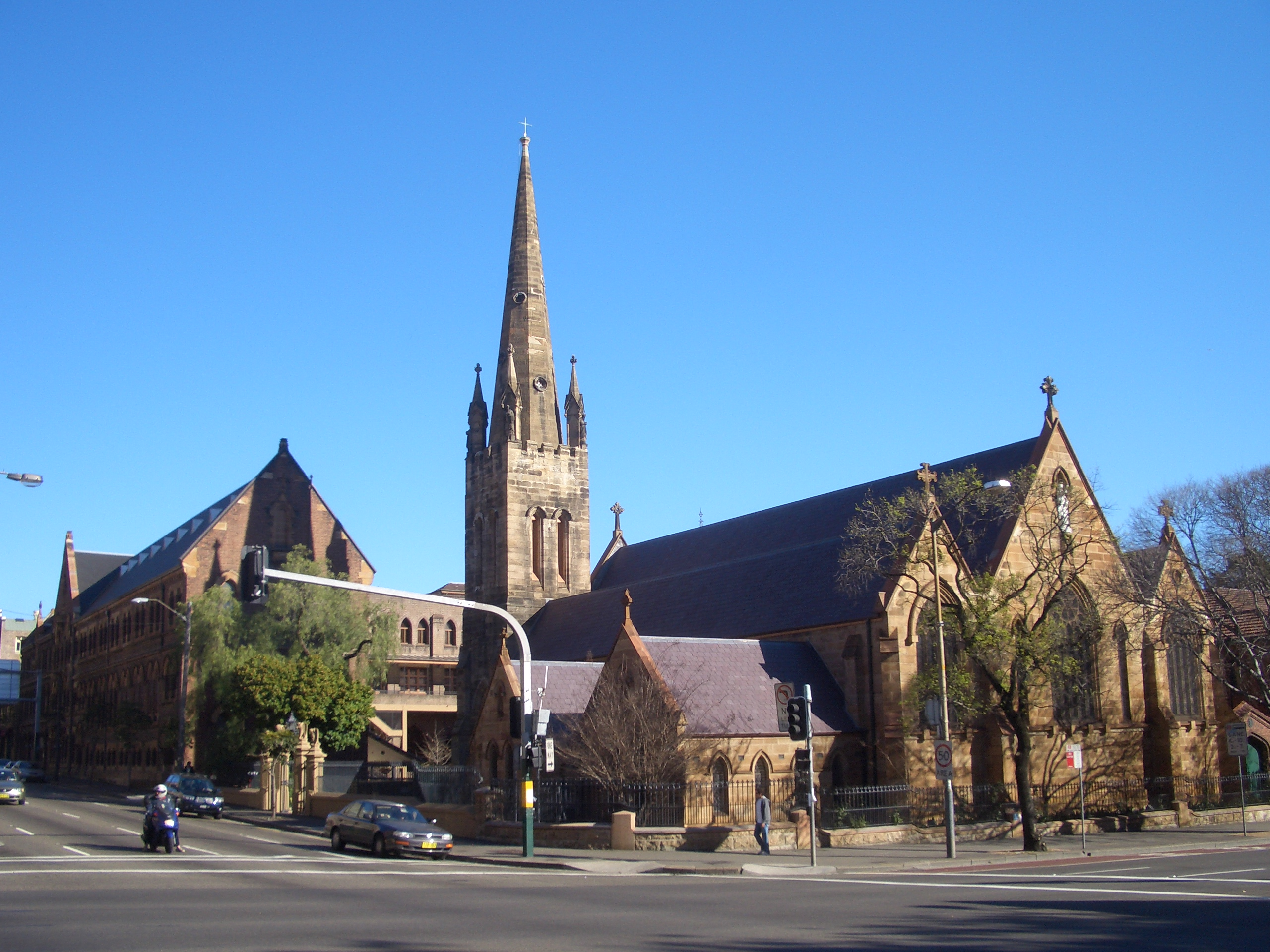
St Benedicts church with the University of Notre Dame behind.

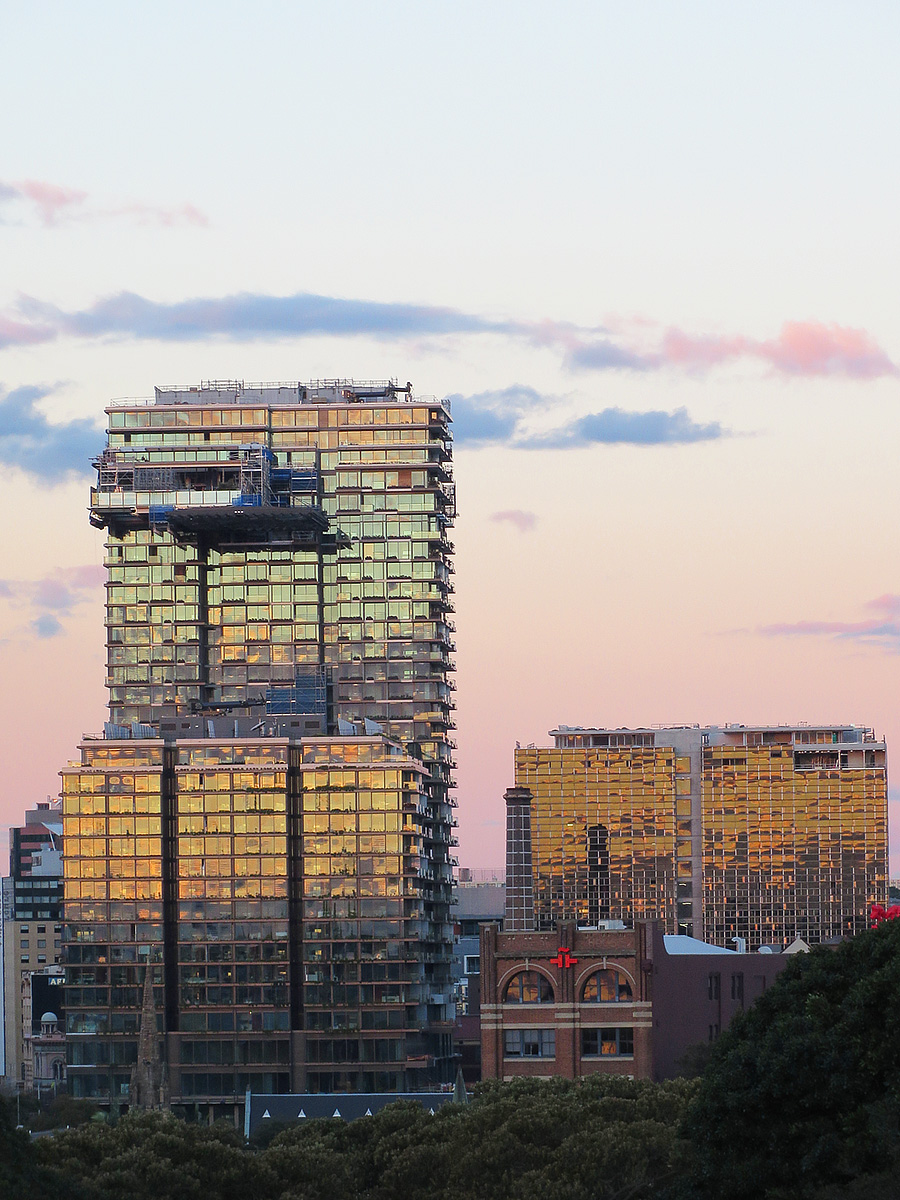
Central Park apartments

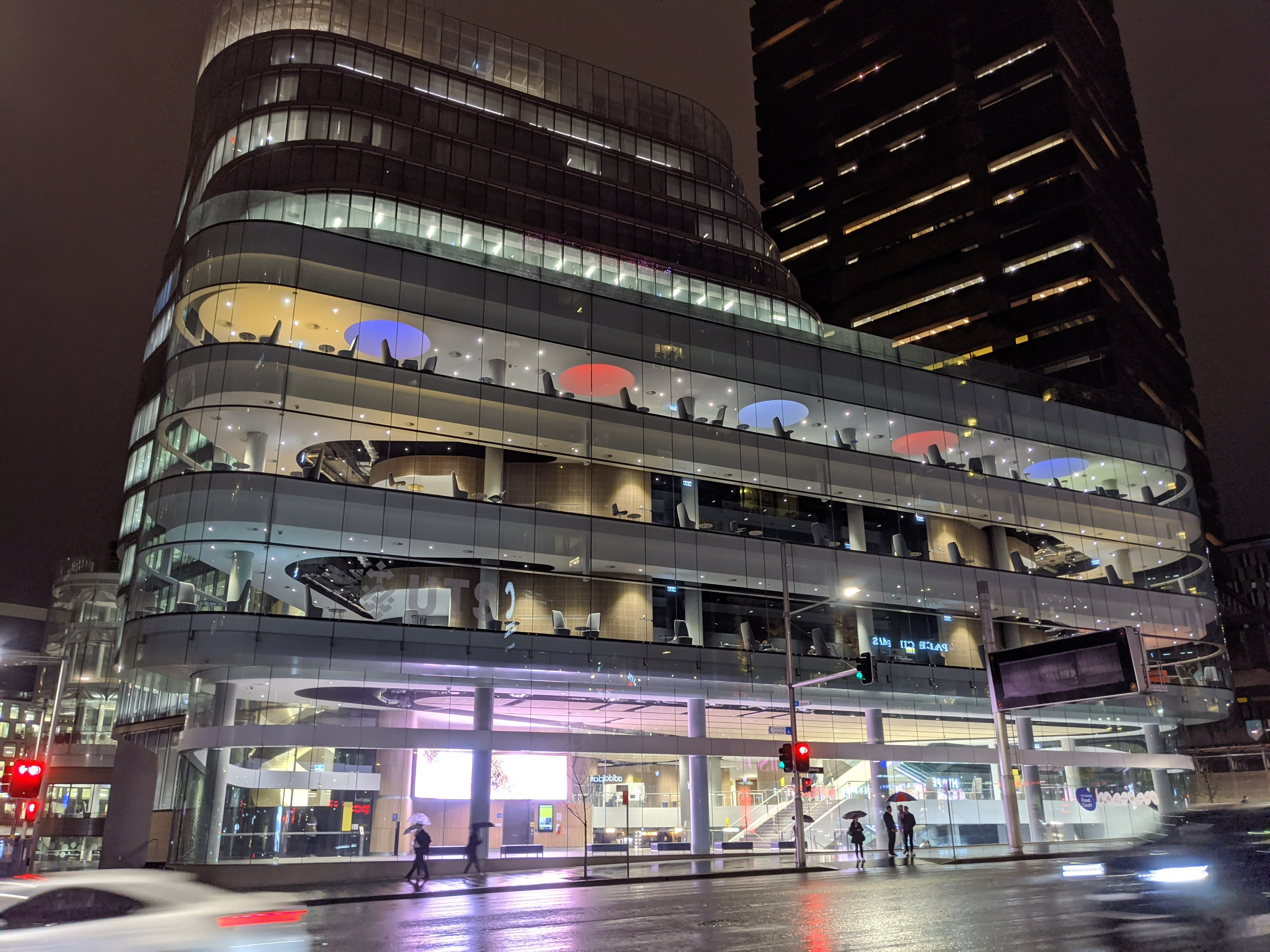
UTS Central as viewed at night

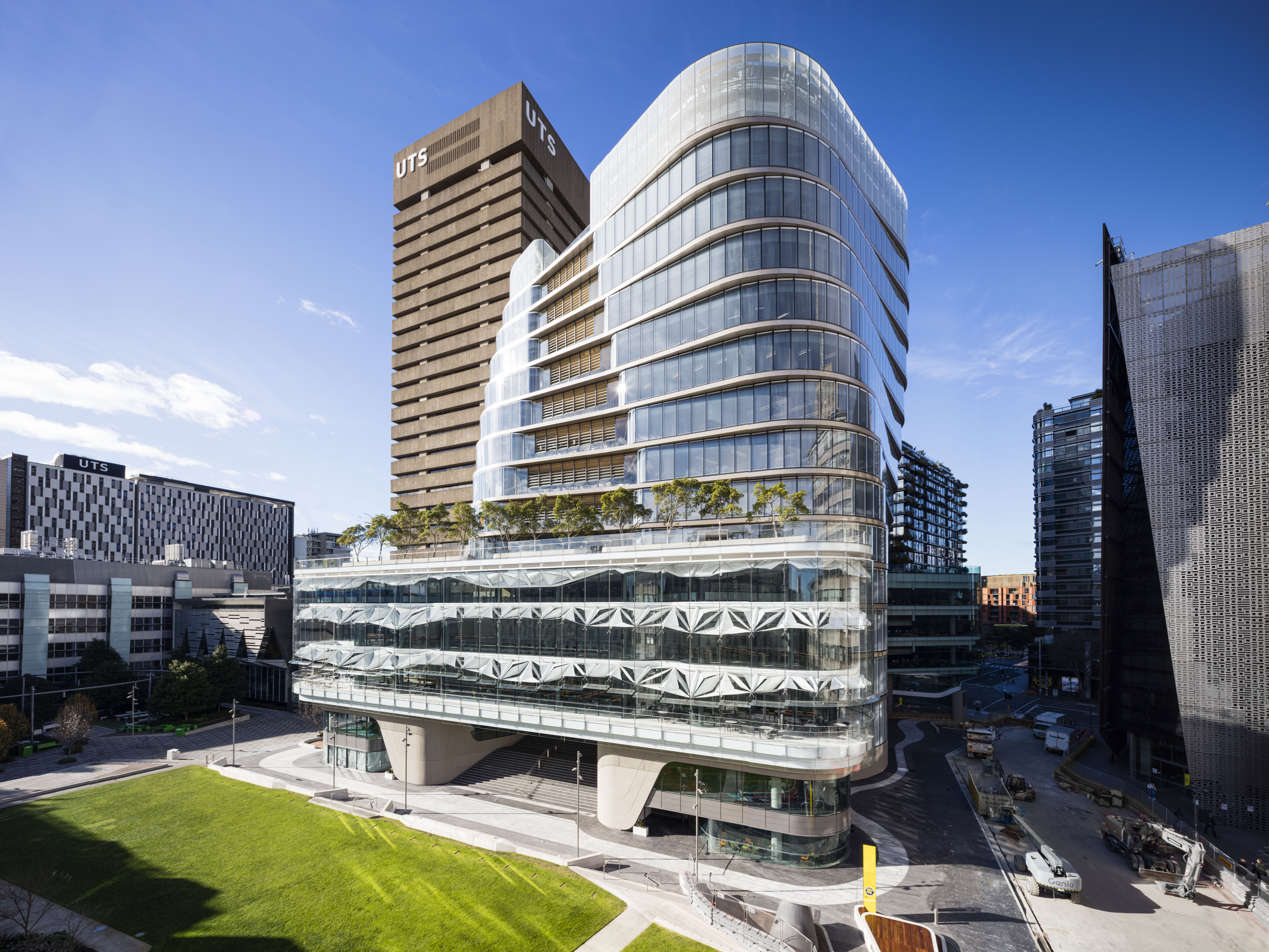
UTS Tower building, University of Technology Sydney

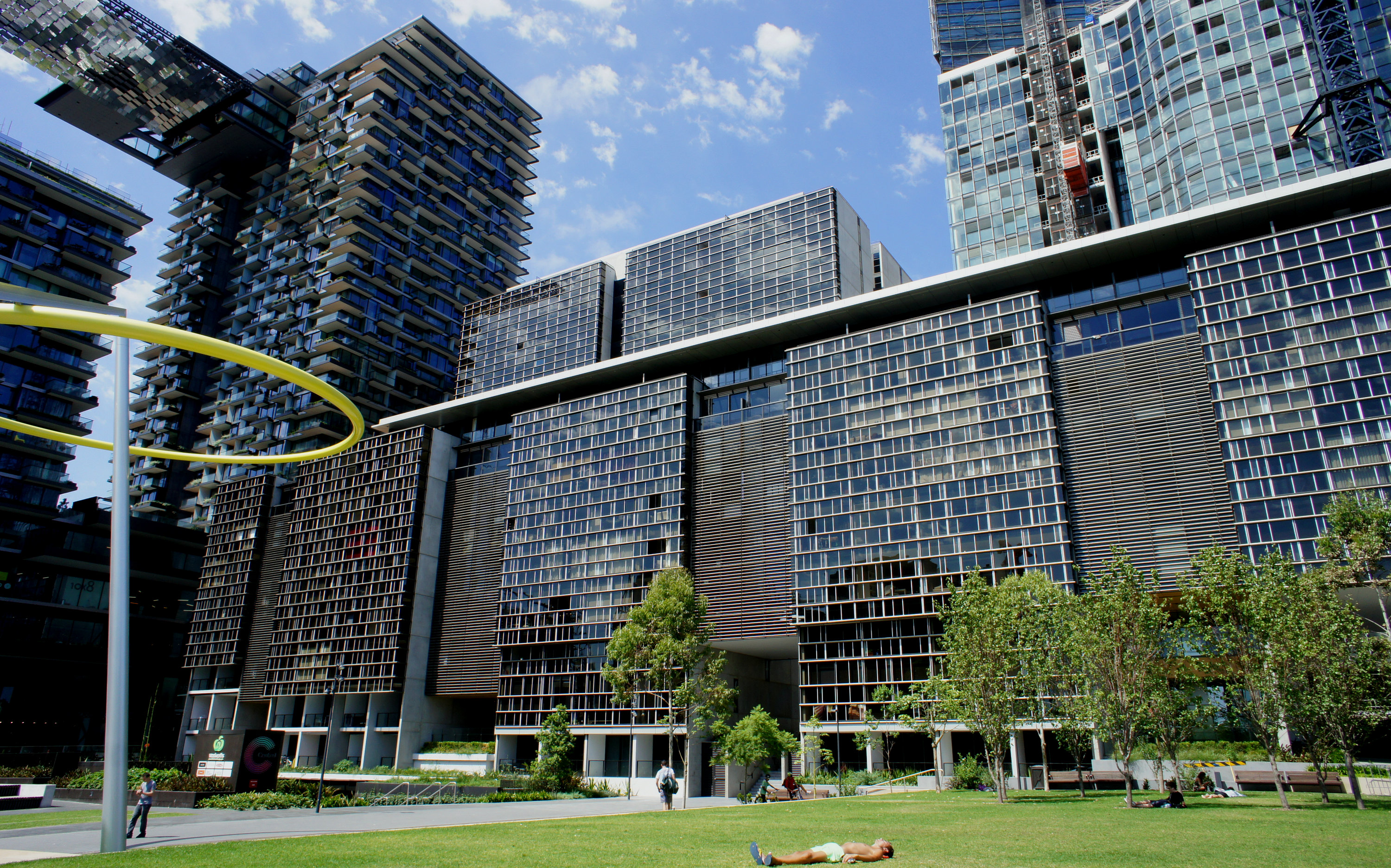
One Central Park apartments

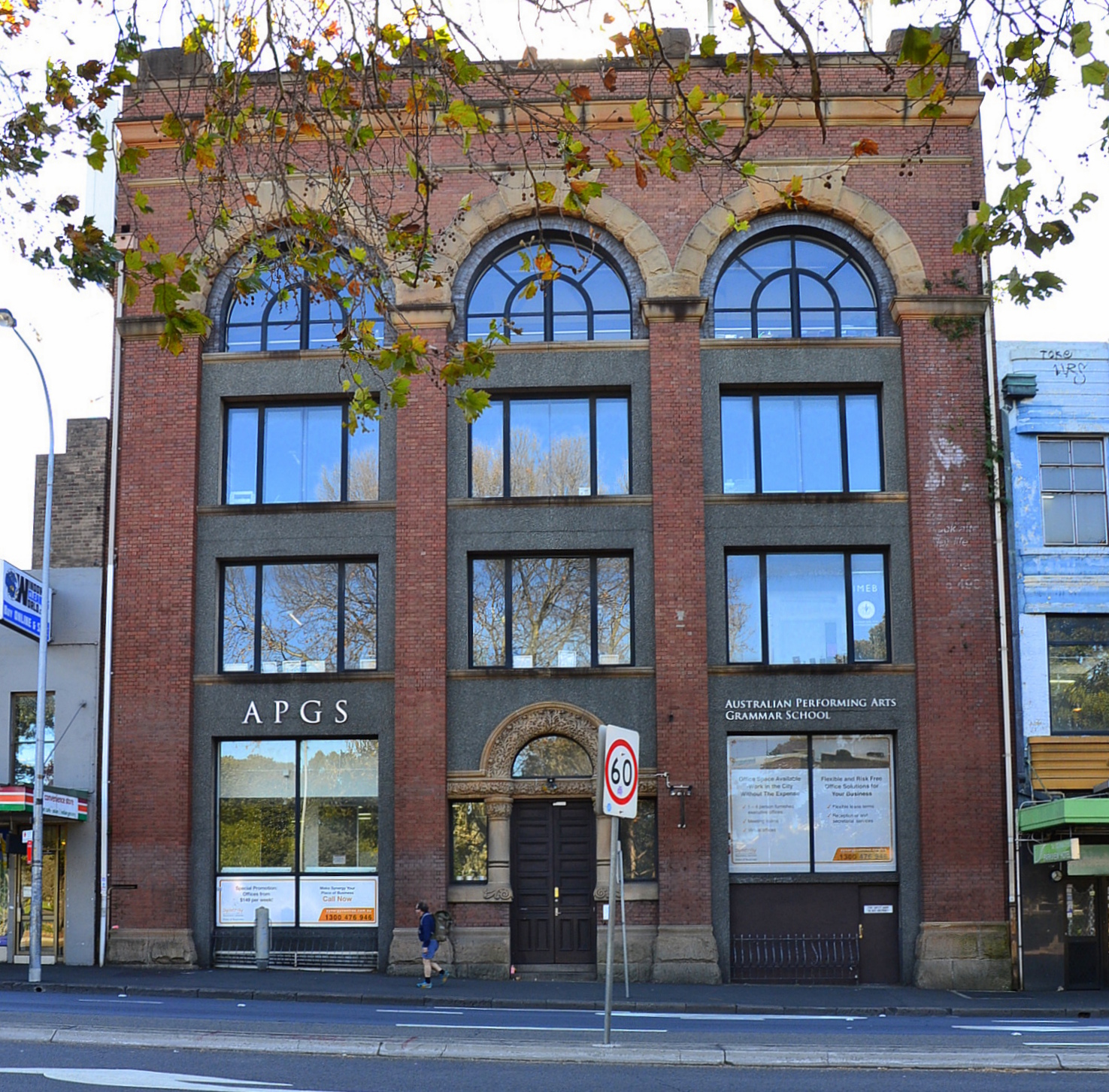
Federation-era warehouse

== In popular culture ==
Part of the video for singer David Bowie's 1983 single "Let's Dance", took place on Broadway in front of the University of Notre Dame Australia.
