= St John's College, Woodlawn =

School in New South Wales

- St John's College, Woodlawn, from the adjacent hill.

Location
- Woodlawn Road, Lismore, Northern Rivers, New South Wales; Australia; 28°47′06″S 153°17′59″E

Information
- Type: Independent co-educational secondary day school
- Motto: Latin: Tenete Traditiones (Hold fast to the traditions)
- Religious affiliation: Association of Marist Schools of Australia
- Denomination: Roman Catholic
- Patron saint: Saint John the Evangelist
- Established: 1931; 95 years ago
- Founders: Marist Fathers
- Oversight: Diocese of Lismore
- Faculty: >100
- Years: 7–12
- Enrollment: 780
- Area: 8 hectares (20 acres)
- Campus type: Rural
- Colours: Red, green and gold
- Mascot: Eagle
- Nickname: Woodlawn
- Accreditation: Land donated by Margaret Buckley
- Newspaper: Woodlawn Newsletter
- Yearbook: The Eagle
- Aboriginal Land: Bundjalung Region
- Website: lisjclism.catholic.edu.au

St John's College, Woodlawn is a Roman Catholic co-educational secondary day school, located in the rural area of Woodlawn on the outskirts of Lismore, in the Northern Rivers region of New South Wales, Australia. The school, commonly abbreviated to Woodlawn, is administered by the Catholic Education Office of the Diocese of Lismore.

In the city of Lismore the four largest industries by employment are the retail sector, health care, education and agriculture. St John's College, originally an agricultural secondary school, has a major part in two of these sectors and of course participates indirectly in the others as well. The school's name is often shortened to "Woodlawn" rather than being named fully. The school was founded by the Marists who continue to play a role in the running of the school. The first lay Rector (Principal) was Glenn Roff, appointed in 2001 when the Marist Fathers withdrew from St John's.

== History ==
St John's College, Woodlawn, was founded from St. Patrick's College, Wellington, New Zealand in 1931. The Marists who began the school themselves originated in France in the early 19th century.

St John's College was formally opened in 1931 as a Boarding and Day school on land which was donated by Margaret Buckley. The first rector of the school was Thomas Segrief S.M, Followed by Frs James Bell, John Kennedy, John Webber, Steven Maloney, Sid Mitchell, John Webber, Garry Reynolds, Lou Molloy, John Worthington, William Ryder, Ray Chapman – all priests of the Society of Mary and the current principal is Aaron Beach.

The college was described in the Northern Star on 25 May 1931:

"St John's Educational and Agricultural College at Woodlawn, on the outskirts of Lismore, and architectural jewel adorning the pastoral diadem of the North Coast, is destined to make history throughout all States of the Commonwealth. Its inspiration is eloquent tribute to the zeal, enthusiasm and practical outlook of that order of the Roman Catholic Church, the Marist Fathers."

For many years, St John was primarily a boarding school for boys. While most students came from country NSW, during the 1960s and 1970s, a substantial number of students came from Sabah, Malaysia.

St John's Woodlawn College has a shameful history when it comes to child abuse. There have been allegations of abuse against several former teachers, and at least two have been criminally convicted for sexually abusing students at the Catholic boarding school.

The two most notorious offenders were James (Jim) Doran and Richard O’Connor, who were both found guilty of over 40 charges of sexually abusing students at Woodlawn. Their victims were all teenage boys, as the College did not become co-ed until 1998.

James Doran Doran was a boarding master and English teacher at Woodlawn in the 1980s. In 2017, he was found guilty of 41 charges relating to sexual offences committed against former Woodlawn students during his time at the College.

The charges included engaging in intercourse without consent and soliciting persons to commit indecent acts. Despite his refusal to plead guilty, he was convicted and sentenced to 13 years in jail.

Richard O’Connor During the 1980s, Richard O’Connor was the discipline master at Woodlawn and also taught both art and English.

In 2015, he pleaded guilty to 40 charges relating to sexual offences committed during his time at Woodlawn, including charges of rape and the sexual assault of students.

=== The 75th anniversary ===
St John's College Woodlawn celebrated its 75th anniversary in 2006. The college held many events throughout the year to celebrate, ranging from the first "Woodlawn Race Day", to "St John's Youth Day" and formal ceremonies. The opening of the renovated chapel was a central part of the ceremonies, with hundreds of alumni returning to be a part of the celebrations. After the Woodlawn Race Day (also known as the Woodlawn Cup), the college executive in association with the Parents and Friends executive decided to hold the day annually.

== Significant days at Woodlawn ==
=== Opening Mass ===
The Opening Mass is the religious event marking the start of the new year. In recent years the Opening Mass has been held at the Lismore Cathedral to allow the entire school to attend and to include the Diocese in the events of the college. The Opening Mass also celebrates the new leaders in the College, the Prefects receive their badges of office, and the newly appointed students' representative council is inducted for the year.

=== College Swimming Carnival ===
Woodlawn Swimming Carnival; at night with its great atmosphere.

=== College Cross Country ===
The course varies between 3 and 5 Kilometres depending on year level and gender and also the time to beat varies, ranging from 30 to 40 minutes to earn extra points. The Cross Country is run over the rolling hills nearby and is easy to walk yet very challenging to run.

=== St John's Day ===
St John's day is the event where Year 12 takes control and has some fun with half the day dedicated to fun activities designed by Year 12s for the rest of the college to enjoy. The profits made from the events go back through the school in the fashion of the Year 12 gift at the end of their years.

== Notable alumni ==
- James Aubusson, NRL Sydney Roosters
- Darrel Chapman, Australian rugby league player
- Ben and Tom Cooper, cricketing brothers
- Ian Donnelly, NRL Melbourne Storm
- Jarred Ellis, AFL Gold Coast Suns
- Matt King, NRL Melbourne Storm
- Aden Ridgeway, Australian politician
- Amos Roberts, NRL Sydney Roosters
- Albert Torrens, NRL Manly Sea Eagles
- Steven Hage, NRL Canterbury-Bankstown Bulldogs
- Michael Gahan, Adelaide Giants, Sydney Blue Sox, & Australian National Baseball Team
- Nick Meaney, NRL Canterbury-Bankstown Bulldogs, Melbourne Storm

== See also ==
- List of Catholic schools in New South Wales
- Catholic education in Australia
