= St Benedict's Catholic Church, Chippendale =

St Benedict's Catholic Church
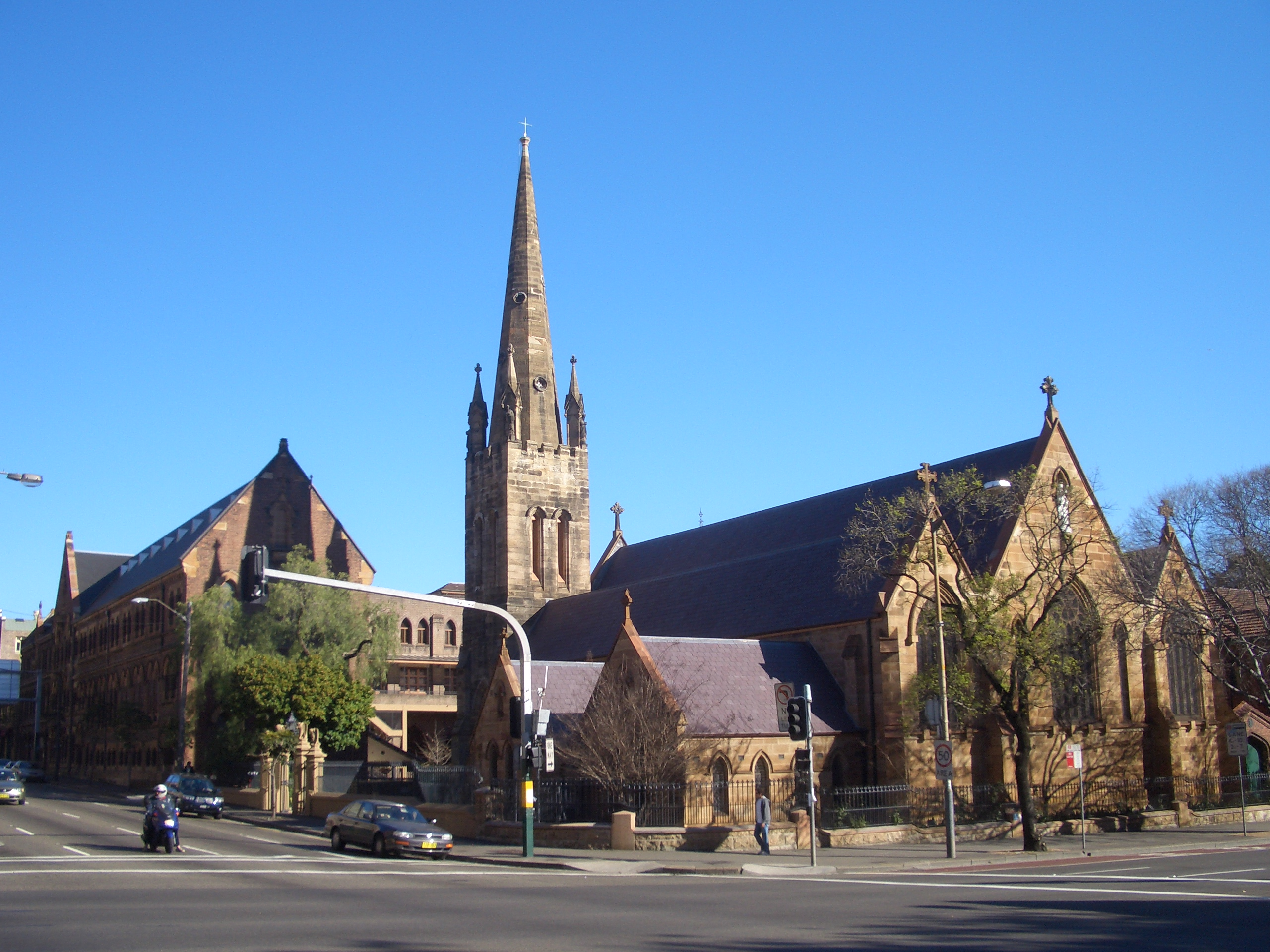
- St Benedict's Catholic Church, Chippendale
- St Benedict's Catholic Church
- 33°53′06″S 151°11′54″E
- Location: 104 Broadway, Chippendale, City of Sydney, New South Wales
- Country: Australia
- Denomination: Roman Catholic
- Website: stbenedicts.org.au

History
- Status: Church
- Dedication: St Benedict
- Dedicated: 21 July 1845 (foundation stone laid by John Bede Polding

Architecture
- Functional status: Completed
- Architect: William Morris
- Architectural type: Church
- Style: Gothic Revival
- Years built: 1845–1852

Administration
- Archdiocese: Sydney
- Parish: Broadway

Clergy
- Priest: Fr. James Baxter

St Benedict's Catholic Church is a Roman Catholic church located at 104 Broadway, Chippendale, City of Sydney, New South Wales, Australia. The church was designed by Augustus Pugin, and built from 1845 to 1852 by William Morris. It is the oldest consecrated Catholic church in Australia and was the parish church of Norman Gilroy, the first Australian-born cardinal of the Roman Catholic Church.

The Sydney campus of University of Notre Dame Australia on the church site was opened in 2006 following an invitation by the Archdiocese of Sydney.
