= Roman Catholic Diocese of Lismore =

Latin Catholic territory in Australia

Diocese of Lismore Dioecesis Lismorensis

Location
- Country: Australia
- Territory: North Coast and Lord Howe Island, New South Wales
- Ecclesiastical province: Sydney
- Coordinates: 28°48′14″S 153°16′58″E

Statistics
- Area: 28,660 km^{2} (11,070 sq mi)
- Population: Total; Catholics: (as of 2021); ▲519,640; ▲107,640 ( 20.7%)
- Parishes: 28

Information
- Denomination: Catholic Church
- Sui iuris church: Latin Church
- Rite: Roman Rite
- Established: 5 May 1887 as the Diocese of Grafton and renamed 13 June 1900
- Cathedral: St Carthage's Cathedral, Lismore, New South Wales
- Patron saint: St. Carthage

Current leadership
- Pope: Leo XIV
- Bishop: Gregory Homeming OCD
- Metropolitan Archbishop: Anthony Fisher OP
- Bishops emeritus: Geoffrey Jarrett

Map
- Map of the Diocese of Lismore

Website
- Diocese of Lismore

The Diocese of Lismore is a Latin Church ecclesiastical jurisdiction or diocese of the Catholic Church in New South Wales, Australia. The diocese was established in 1887, initially as the Diocese of Grafton, and then changed to the current name in 1900. The Diocese of Lismore covers the North Coast and is also responsible for the Church of St Agnes on Lord Howe Island. It is a suffragan in the ecclesiastical province of the metropolitan Archdiocese of Sydney.

== Ordinaries ==
=== Bishops of Grafton ===
Bishops of Grafton:

Order	Name	Date installed	Term ended	Term of office	Reason for term end
1	Jeremiah Joseph Doyle	13 May 1887	4 June 1909	22 years, 22 days	Died in office

=== Bishops of Lismore ===
Bishops of Lismore:

Order	Name	Date installed	Term ended	Term of office	Reason for term end
1	John Carroll	2 December 1909	8 May 1949	39 years, 157 days	Died in office
2	Patrick Joseph Farrelly	8 May 1949	1 September 1971	22 years, 116 days	Retired and was appointed Bishop Emeritus of Lismore
3	John Steven Satterthwaite	1 September 1971	1 December 2001	30 years, 91 days	Retired and was appointed Bishop Emeritus of Lismore
4	Geoffrey Jarrett	1 December 2001	22 February 2017	15 years, 83 days	Retired and was appointed Bishop Emeritus of Lismore
5	Greg Homeming	22 February 2017	present		n/a

=== Coadjutor bishops ===
- Patrick Joseph Farrelly (1931–1949)
- John Steven Satterthwaite (1969–1971)
- Geoffrey Hylton Jarrett (2000–2001)

=== Other priests of this diocese who became bishops ===
- Terence Bernard McGuire, appointed Bishop of Townsville in 1930
- Norman Thomas Gilroy, appointed Bishop of Port Augusta in 1934; future Cardinal
- Thomas Absolam McCabe, appointed Bishop of Port Augusta in 1938
- Thomas William Muldoon, appointed Auxiliary Bishop of Sydney, in 1960

== Cathedral ==
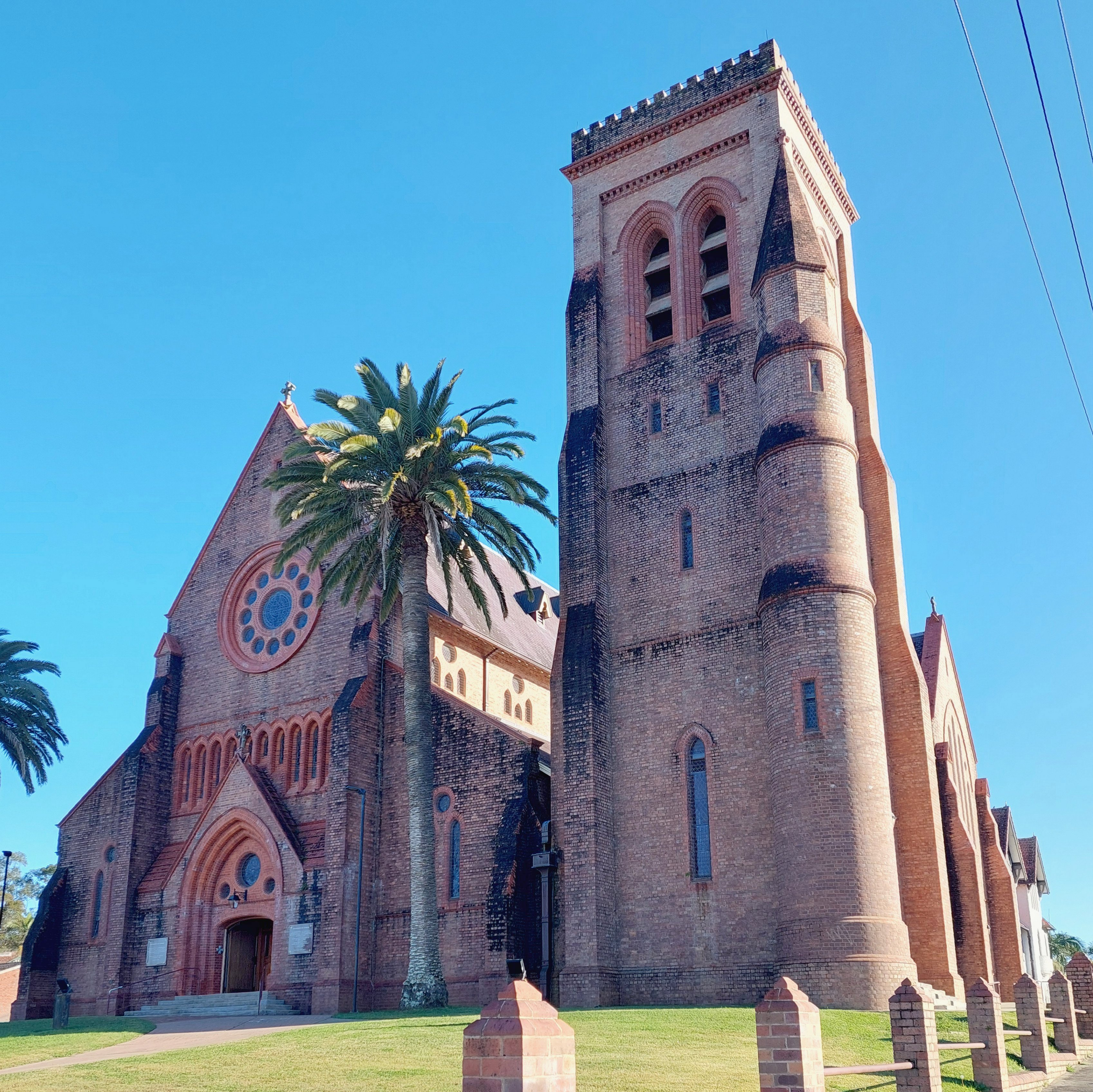
St. Carthage's Cathedral at Lismore, Australia, exterior, August 2024

The Cathedral of St Carthage's was commissioned by Bishop Jeremiah Doyle c. 1890. Designed in 1892 by Herbert Wardell (the son of notable Anglo – Australian architect and civil engineer William Wardell), the cathedral is modelled in Gothic Revival style. The foundation stone was laid in 1892 and construction began in early 1904, with the sanctuary, transepts and nave completed by mid-1907 when the first liturgical mass was held. A public appeal was held to raise £2,000 for the peal of twelve bells from Dublin, that were installed in the bell tower by 1911. A large pipe organ completed the project and in 1919, with all debts dissolved, St Carthage's Cathedral received its solemn dedication by the Apostolic Delegate, Archbishop Cattaneo.

In 2007, the cathedral was seriously damaged by hail storms in the region. An appeal to restore the cathedral commenced in 2007, with initial plans to construct the spire initially designed by Wardell. However, when commissioning the works in 2009, the main focus of the project was on roof slates, stained glass windows, and lead downpipes; with completion of the stone steeple ruled out.

== Other information ==
The Catholic Education Office which is responsible for 46 co-educational schools in the Diocese, is located in Lismore. The Aboriginal Catholic Ministry is located in Macksville. The Diocese also offers a number of health and aged care services ranging from child care to nursing homes to natural family planning services.

The diocese also has a community of Marist Brothers, another of Presentation Sisters and a convent of Carmelite Nuns.

== See also ==
- Roman Catholicism in Australia
