= St Carthage's Cathedral (Lismore, New South Wales) =

Roman Catholic cathedral in New South Wales, Australia

St Carthage's Cathedral, Lismore
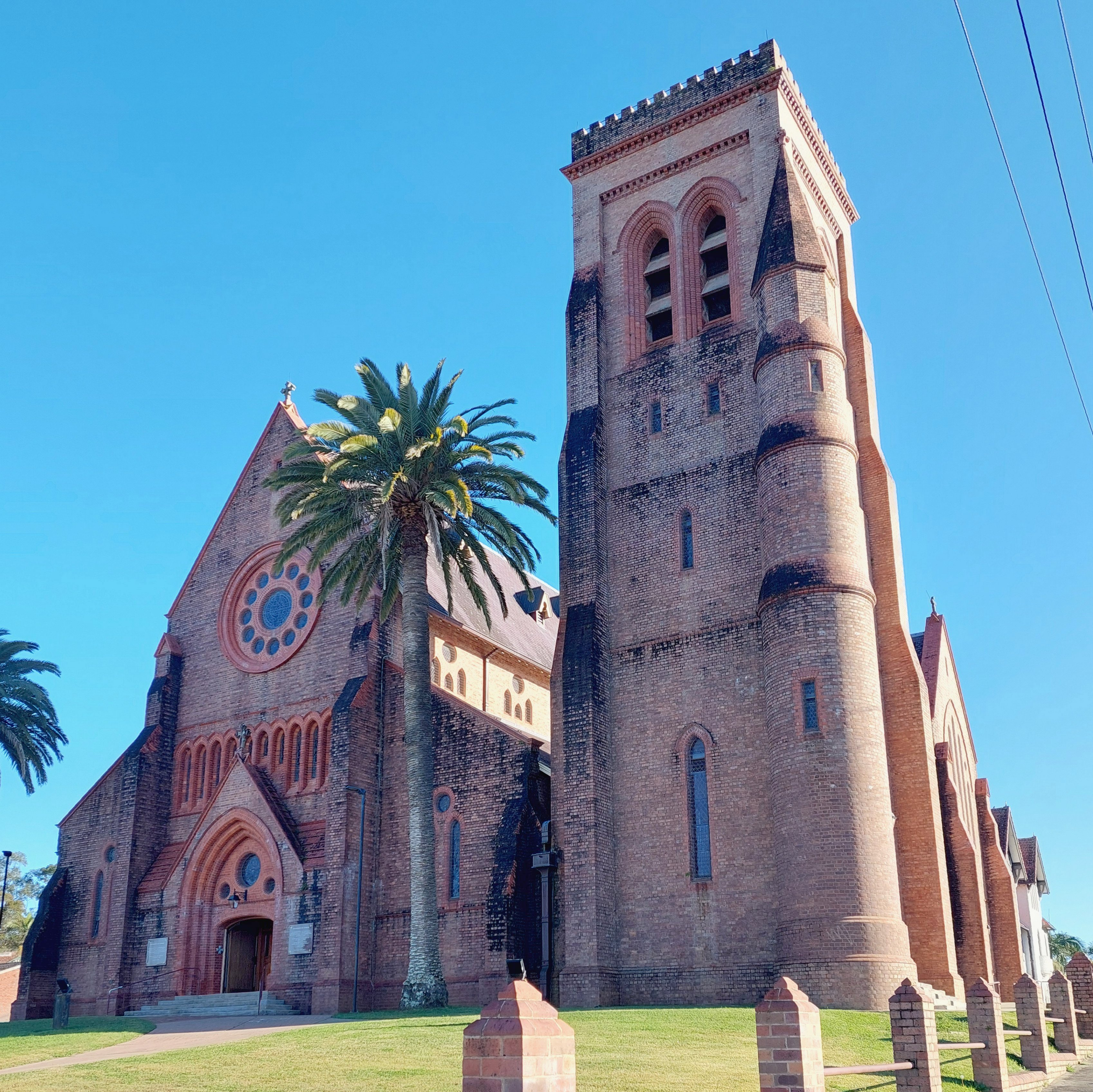
- The Cathedral from the south-east

Religion
- Affiliation: Roman Catholic Latin Rite
- District: Lismore
- Ecclesiastical or organisational status: Cathedral
- Leadership: Greg Homeming OCD
- Year consecrated: 15 August 1919

Location
- Location: Lismore, New South Wales, Australia
- Interactive map of St Carthage's Cathedral, Lismore
- Coordinates: 28°48′16″S 153°17′01″E

Architecture
- Architect: Herbert Wardell
- Type: Church
- Groundbreaking: 2 October 1892 (initial foundation stone laid)
- Completed: 18 August 1907 (sanctuary, transepts and nave completed)

St Carthage's Cathedral, Lismore is the cathedral church of the Roman Catholic Diocese of Lismore and the seat of the Bishop of Lismore, New South Wales, currently the Most Reverend Greg Homeming OCD.

== History ==
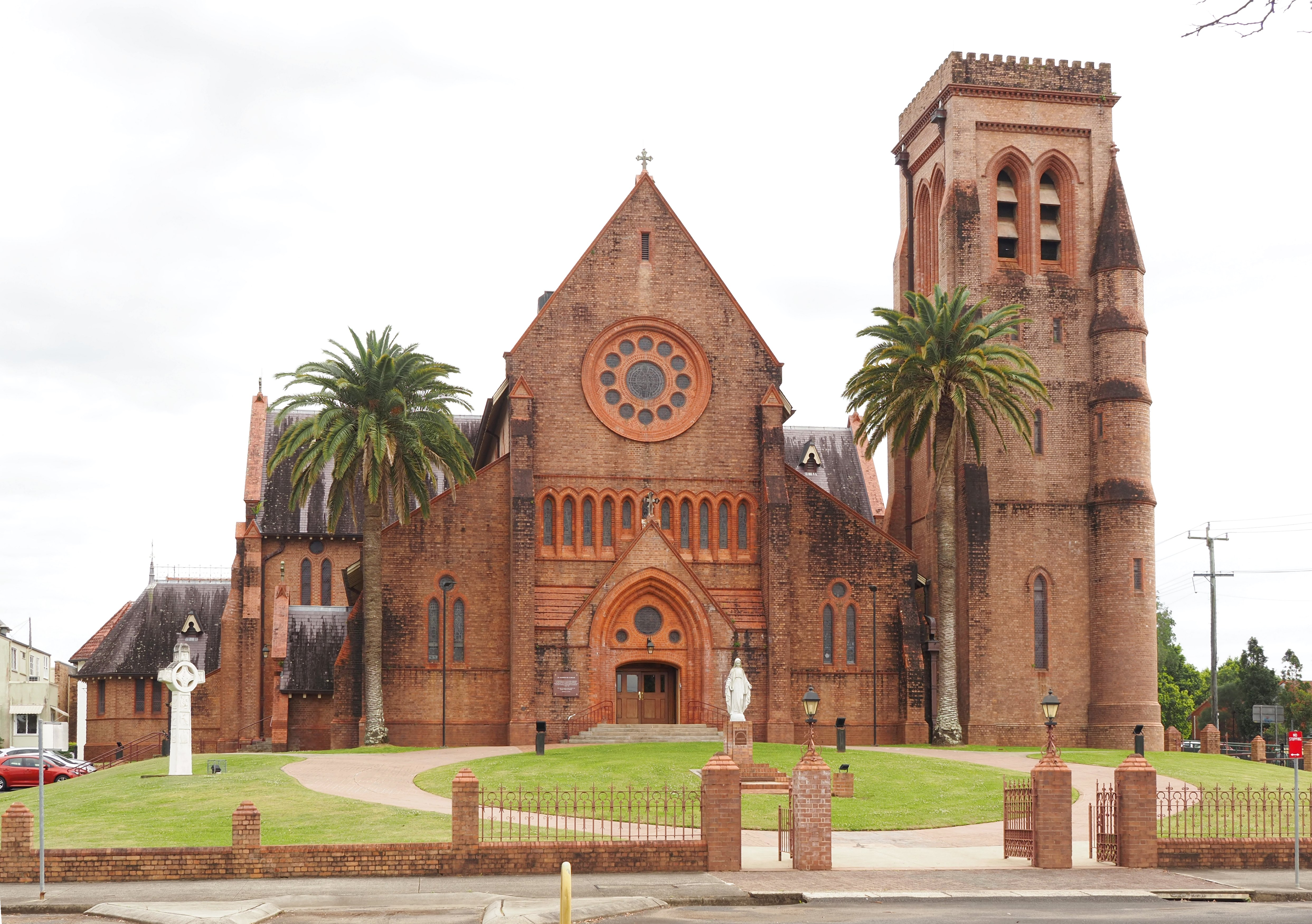
St Carthage's Cathedral at Lismore, Australia, exterior, October 2024

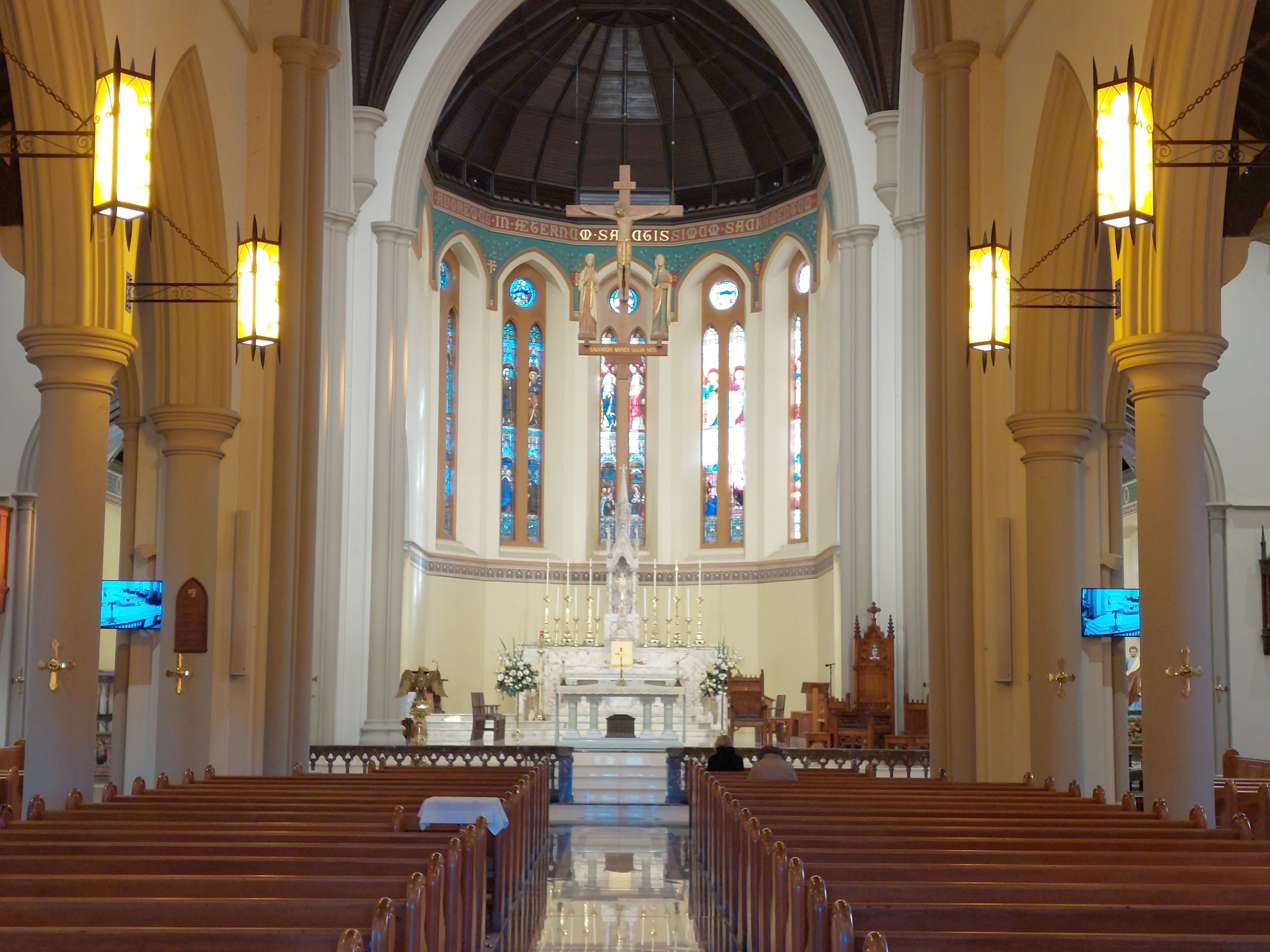
St Carthage's Cathedral at Lismore, Australia, interior (1), August 2024

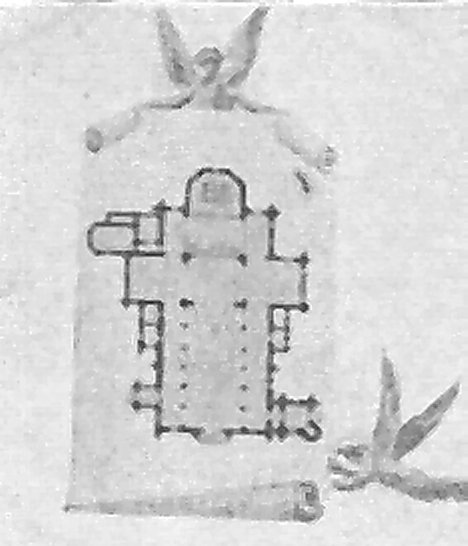
St Carthage's Cathedral, Lismore, New South Wales: architect's drawing circa 1900 - detail showing proposed plan

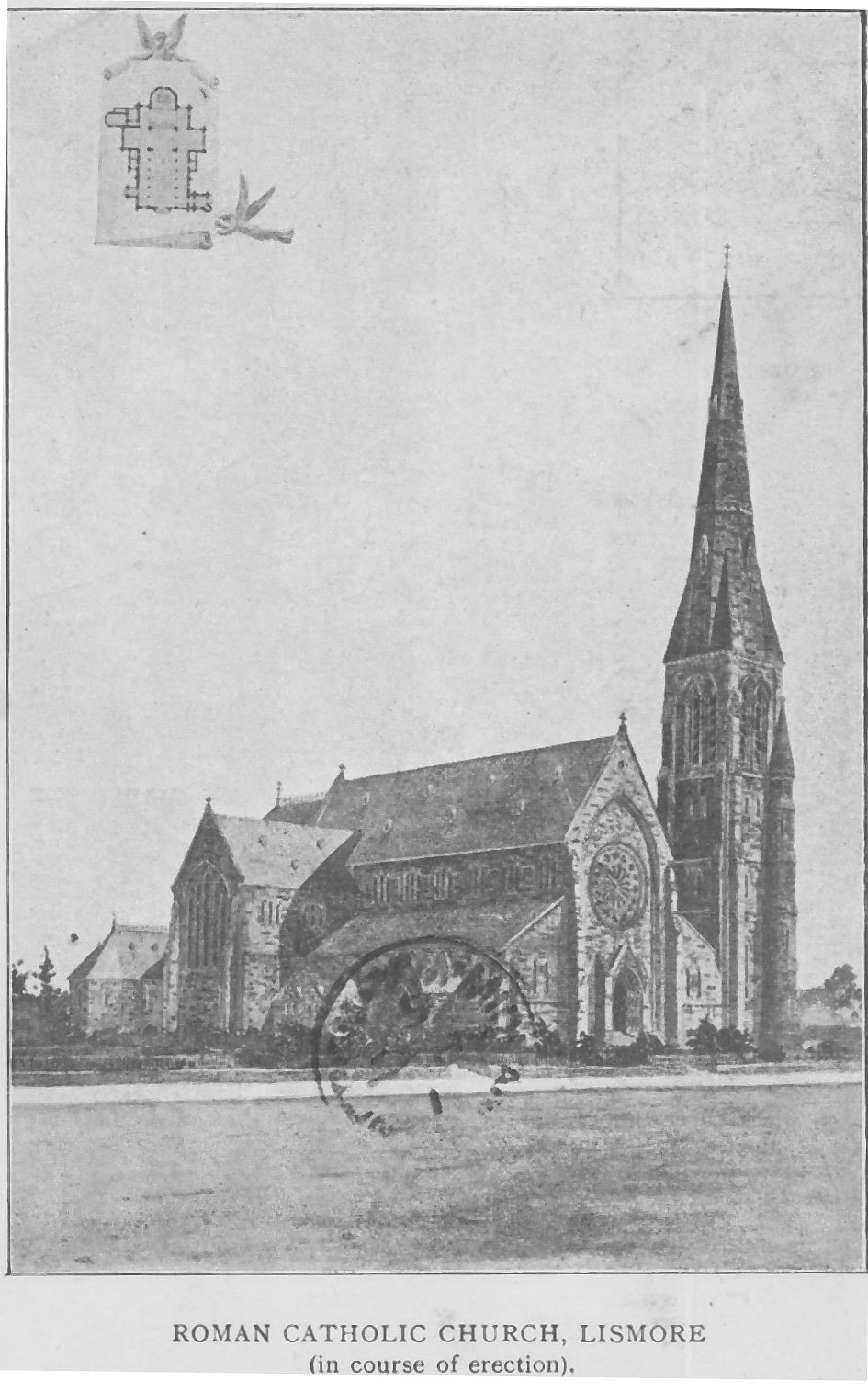
St Carthage's Cathedral, Lismore, New South Wales: architect's drawing circa 1900 - proposed external appearance (the spire was never built)

The Diocese of Lismore (called the Diocese of Grafton until 1900) was created in 1887, and initially used the Church of St Mary in Grafton as its cathedral. When Jeremiah Doyle was consecrated as bishop of the new diocese on 28 August 1887, he chose to reside in Lismore and started planning a new cathedral.

Herbert Wardell, son of famed architect William Wilkinson Wardell, was commissioned as the project's architect. He also worked on many other of Australia's cathedrals including St Patrick's Cathedral, Melbourne, St Mary's Cathedral, Hobart, and the rebuilt St Mary's Cathedral, Sydney.

Bishop Doyle laid the foundation stone for the Lismore cathedral in 1892. A period of economic depression during the 1890s and the Australian banking crisis of 1893 meant several banks closed however, delaying any work on the project for several years. Work resumed in 1904 however a fire in 1905, which also destroyed the Presentation Convent and St Mary's School, delayed the project even further.

Despite the setback, Bishop Doyle borrowed money and the cathedral was largely completed by 1907 when it was dedicated by Cardinal Francis Moran. Doyle unexpectedly died of cerebral haemorrhage in his house at Lismore, on 4 June 1909. He was buried at the cathedral in accordance with his wishes. The bells arrived following his death. Over the next 2 years the bell tower was constructed and the cost of installing the bells met by public subscription, with the bells consecrated in June 1911. At the consecration service for the bells, Bishop Doyle's successor Bishop Carroll stated that the expenditure on the tower and bells was £8,700, with the amount raised being £8,886, leaving his lordship "a nest egg of £186 to beautify the grounds".

== Dedication ==
St Carthage's Cathedral was named after the Cathedral of the same name, located in Lismore, County Waterford, Ireland.

== Renovations ==
In 1912, Bishop John Carroll added a pipe organ to the cathedral. Its altar of Australianmarble was added in 1919. In 1937, Bishop Carroll dedicated a mosaic shrine that honours St Patrick.

In 1977, a rearrangement and extension of the Cathedral sanctuary was commenced under Bishop John Satterthwaite.

== Flooding ==
In 2022, Lismore and other parts of northern New South Wales and South-East Queensland were flooded. The Wilson River in Lismore reached 14.37 metres at its peak, the largest flood since modern records began. The cathedral was extensively damaged and could not be used for several months.

== Gallery ==
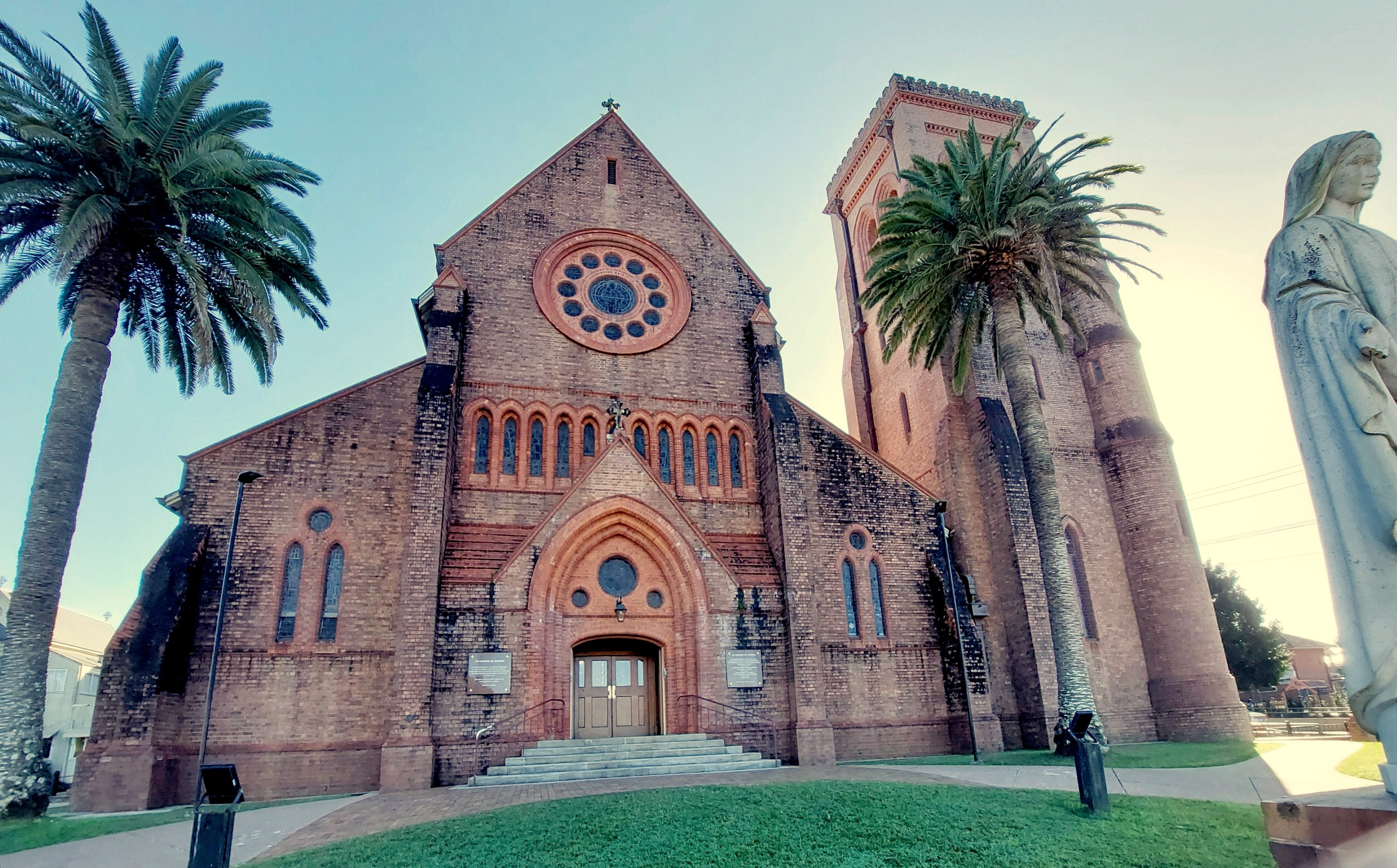
St Carthage's Cathedral at Lismore, Australia, southern aspect, August 2024

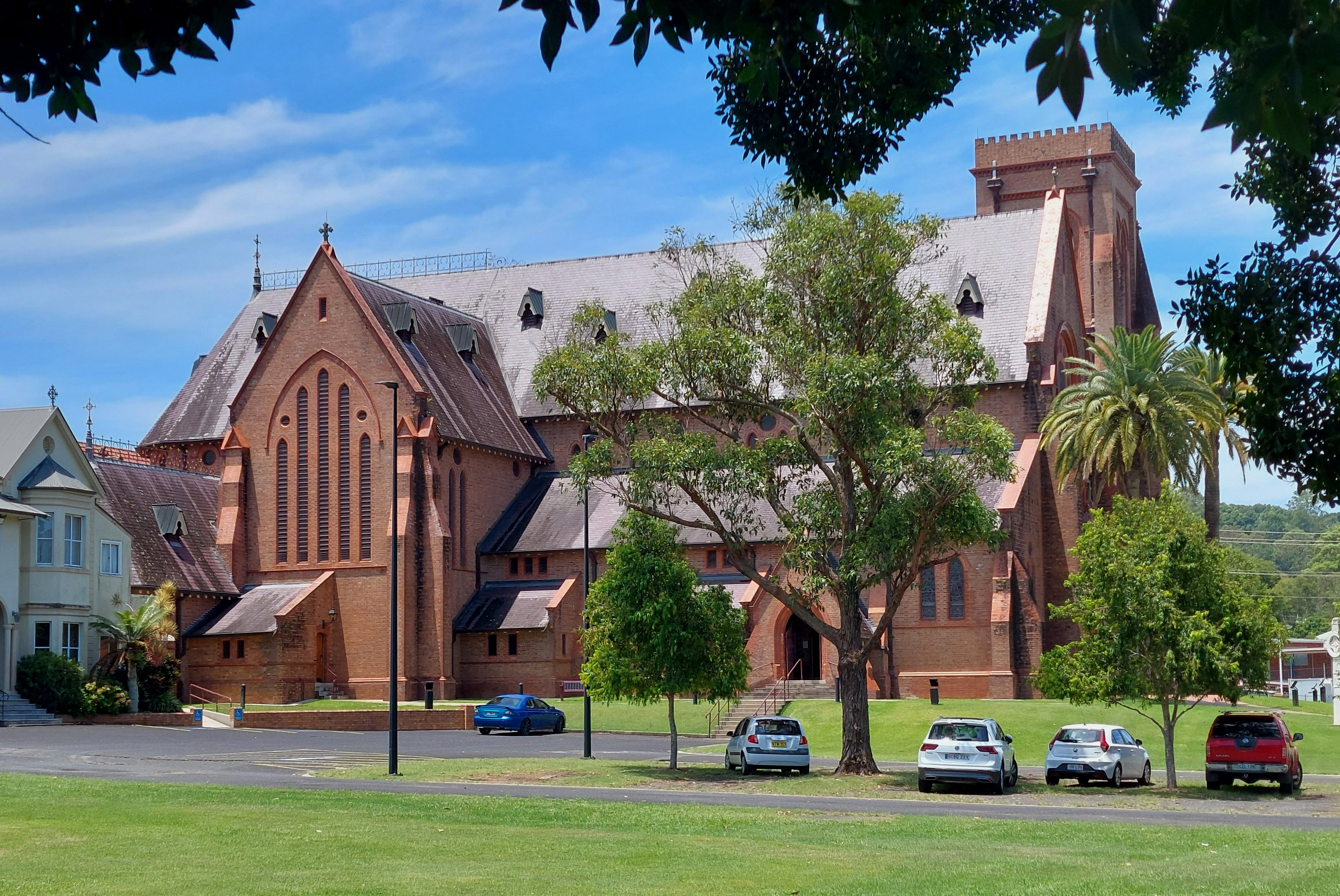
St Carthage's Cathedral, Lismore, west side, January 2025

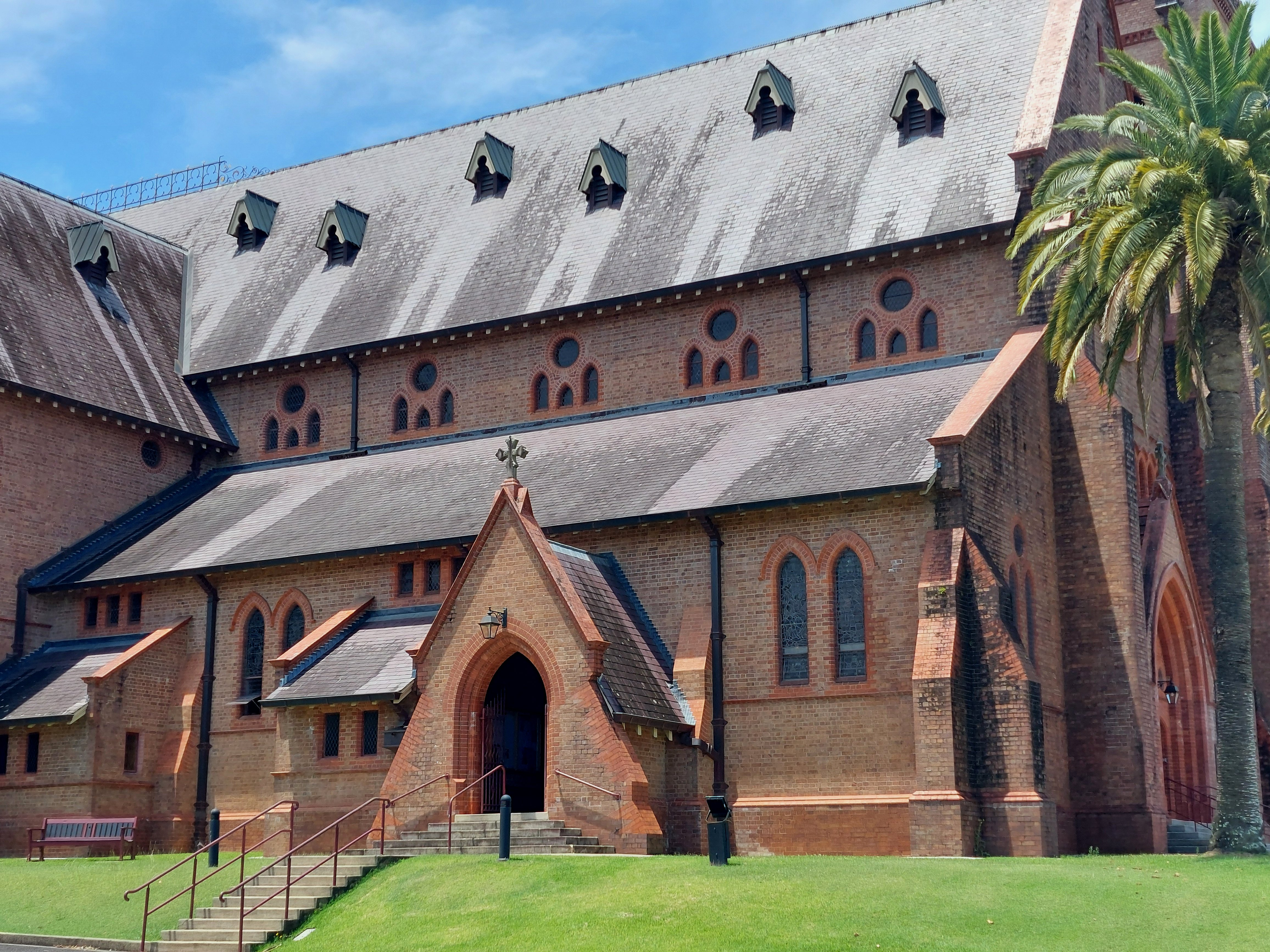
St Carthage's Cathedral, Lismore, west side (detail), January 2025

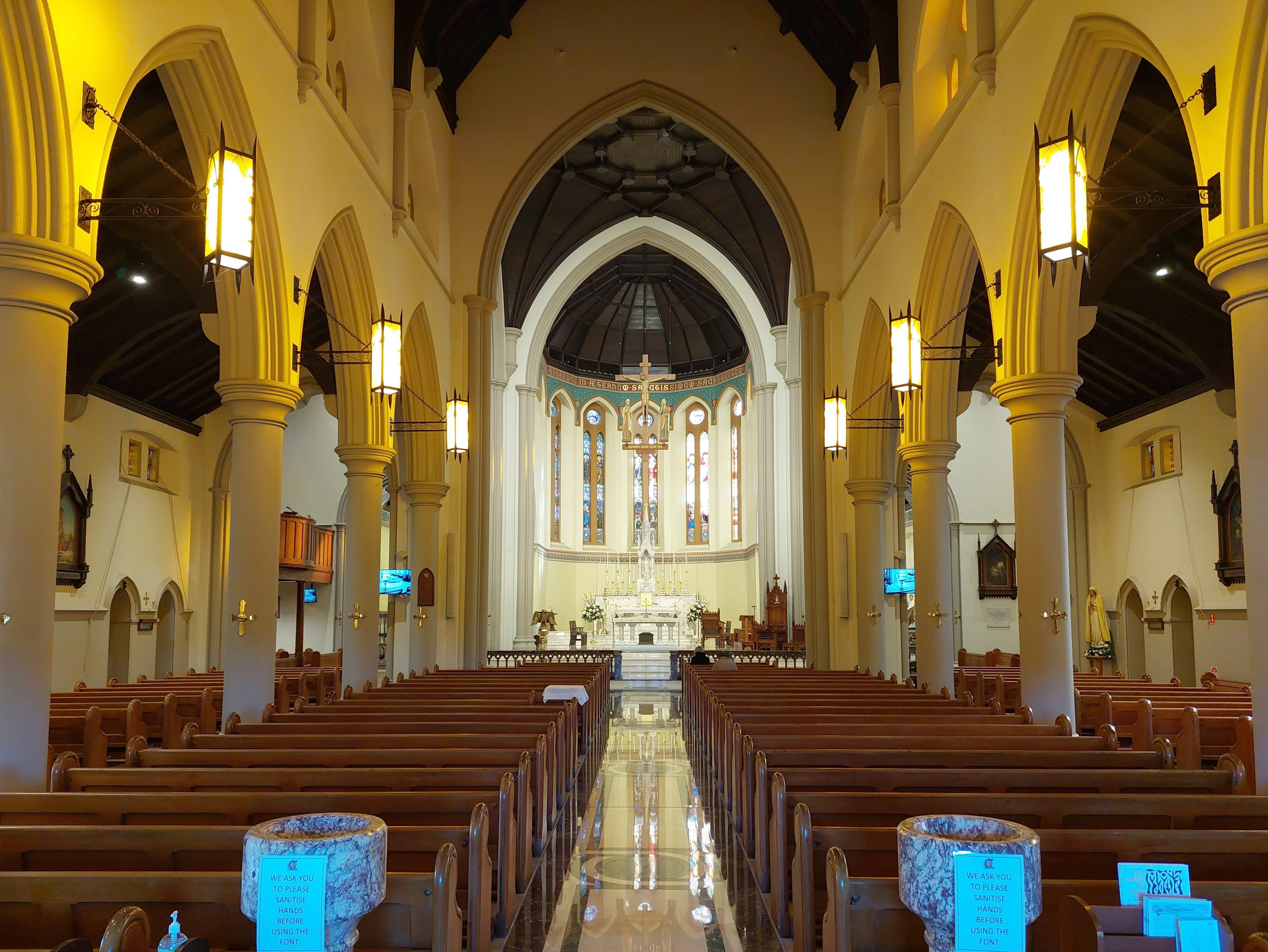
St Carthage's Cathedral at Lismore, Australia, interior (2), August 2024

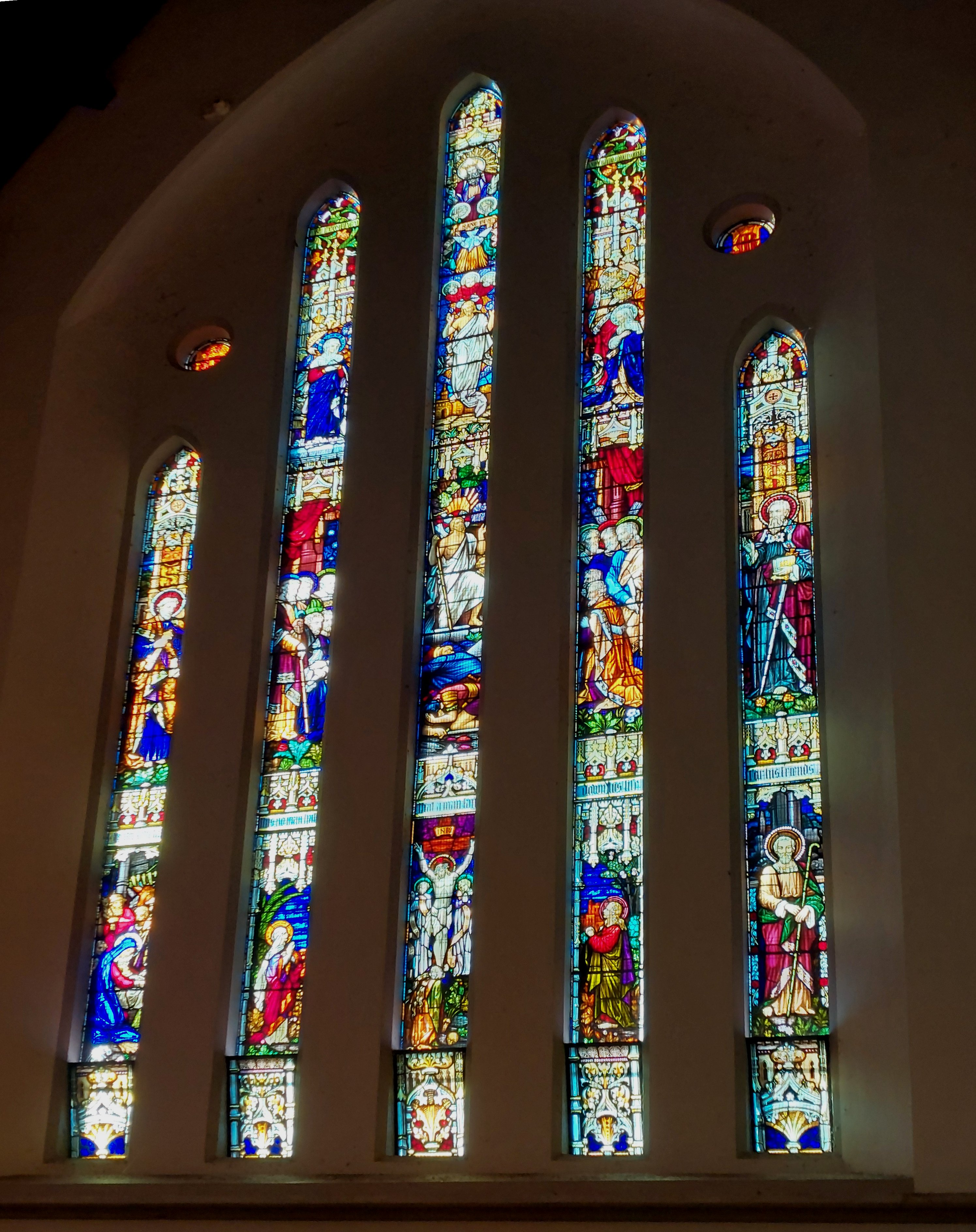
St Carthage's Cathedral at Lismore, Australia, interior (3), August 2024

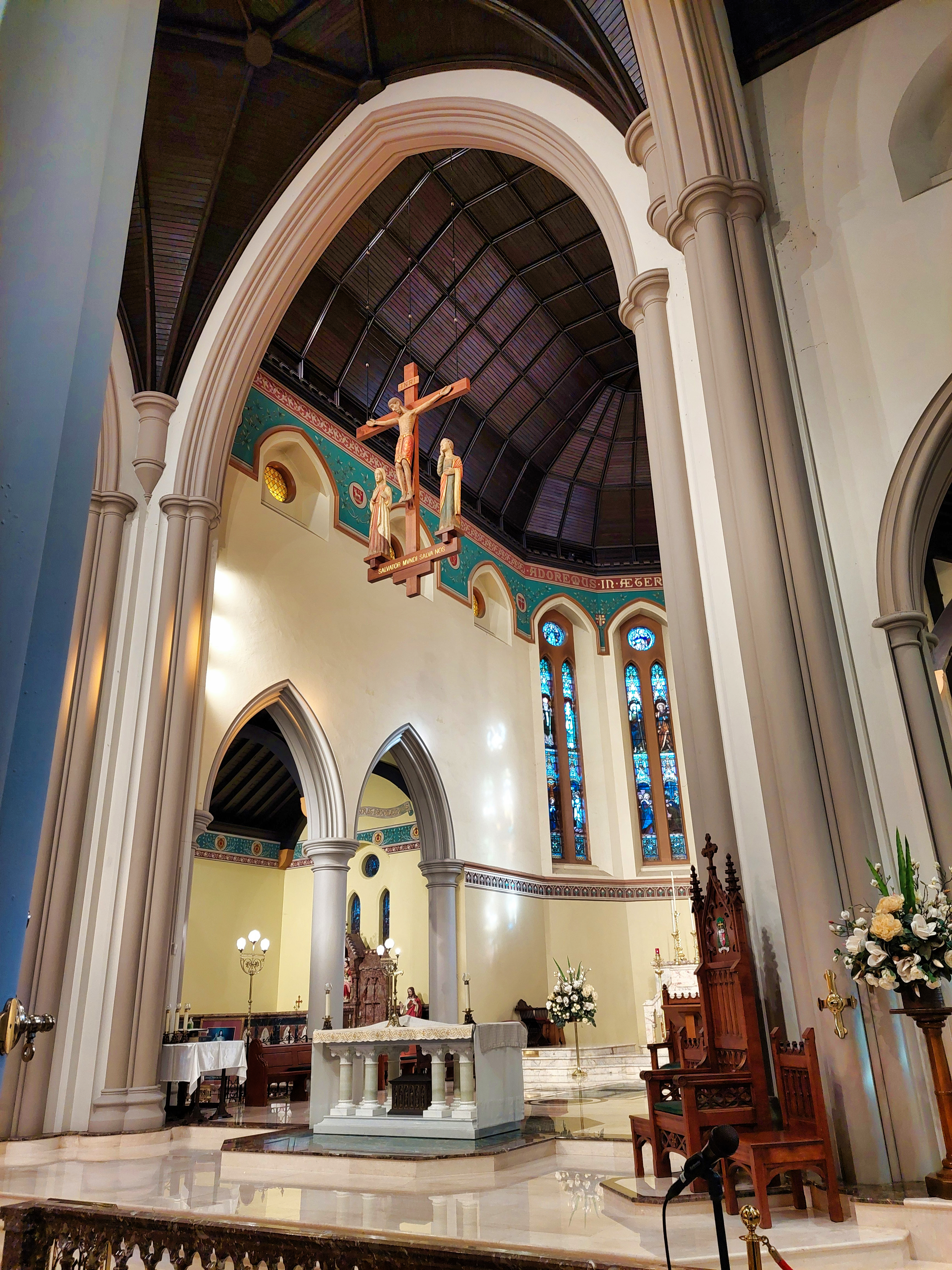
St Carthage's Cathedral at Lismore, Australia, interior (4), August 2024

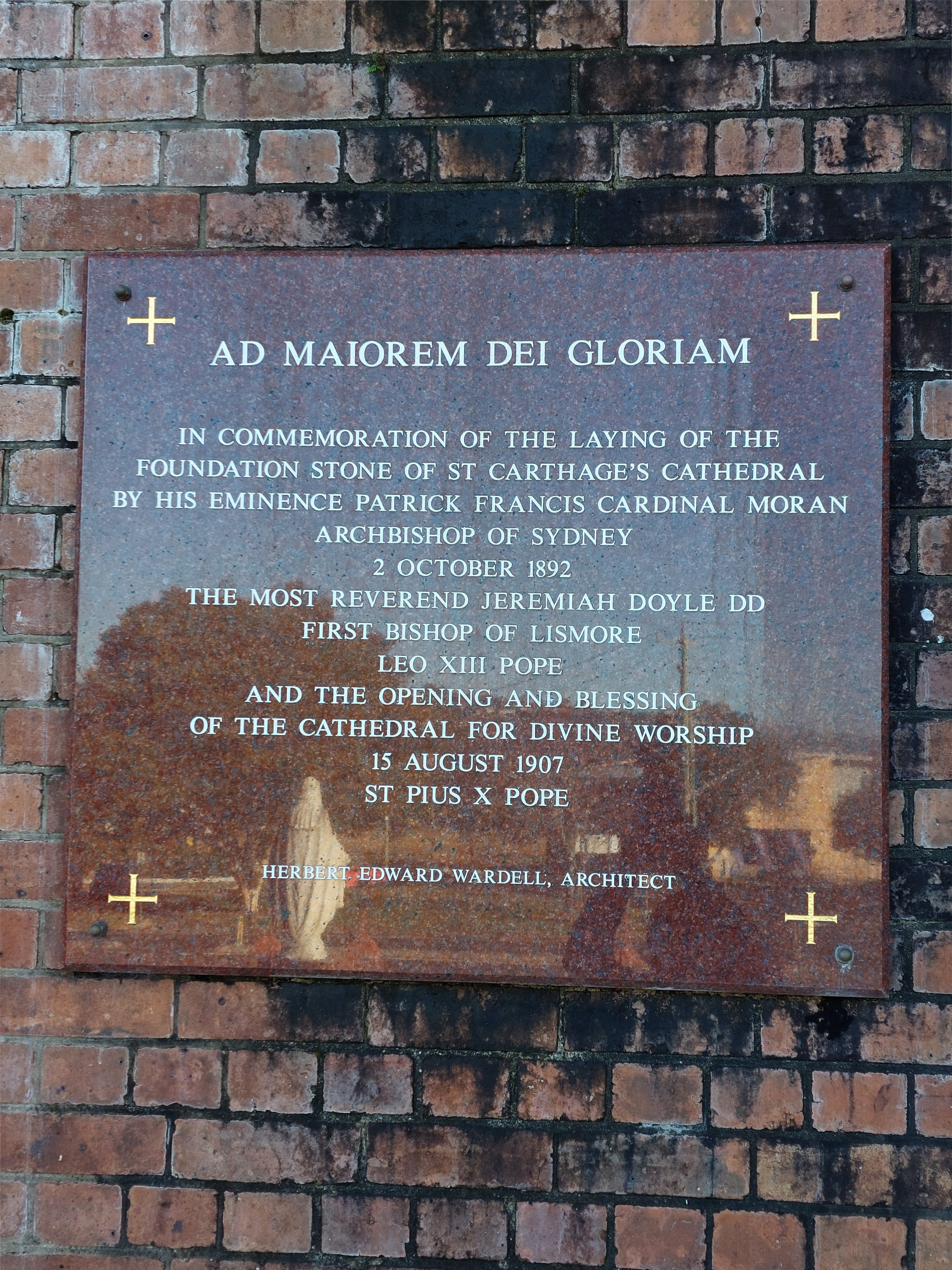
St Carthage's Cathedral at Lismore, Australia, stone commemorating foundation and opening
