= Brian Mascord =

Australian bishop (born 1959)

The Most Reverend Brian Mascord
- 5th Roman Catholic Bishop of Wollongong
- Church: St Francis Xavier's Cathedral, Wollongong
- Archdiocese: Sydney
- Province: New South Wales
- Diocese: Wollongong
- Appointed: 30 November 2017
- Installed: 22 February 2018
- Predecessor: Peter William Ingham

Orders
- Ordination: 31 October 1992 by Leo Clarke
- Consecration: 22 February 2018 by Anthony Fisher, Peter Ingham, William Wright

Personal details
- Born: Brian Gregory Mascord; 30 January 1959 (age 67) Newcastle, New South Wales, Australia
- Denomination: Roman Catholic Church
- Occupation: Roman Catholic bishop
- Profession: priest
- Education: St Patrick's Seminary, Manly
- Motto: "For all things give thanks"
- Coat of arms

Brian Gregory Mascord (born 30 January 1959) is an Australian bishop. He is the fifth bishop of the Roman Catholic Diocese of Wollongong.

Mascord was born in Newcastle, New South Wales. He is the son of Ron Mascord and Margaret Callinan. He was educated at St Joseph's Catholic School in Charlestown and St Pius X College in Adamstown.

Before entering St. Patrick's Seminary in Manly, Mascord earned a diploma of teaching at the Catholic College of Education (now part of the Australian Catholic University) in Castle Hill, spending six years teaching in a Catholic primary school. He was ordained on 31 October 1992 at Sacred Heart Church in Hamilton. He then worked in a parish in pastoral care before becoming pastor of the parish of St Mary MacKillop in Charlestown, New South Wales, director of the pastoral ministry in the Diocese of Maitland-Newcastle and a member of the diocesan committee for the liturgy. Since 2013, Mascord was also vicar general of the Diocese of Maitland-Newcastle.

On 30 November 2017, Pope Francis appointed him Bishop of Wollongong.

== Consecration ==
Mascord was consecrated as a bishop on 22 February 2018, at the WIN Entertainment Centre, Wollongong. His principal consecrator was Archbishop Anthony Fisher OP, Archbishop of Sydney, while the principal co-consecrators were Bishop Peter Ingham, Bishop Emeritus of Wollongong, and Bishop William Wright, Bishop of Maitland-Newcastle.

Catholic Church titles
Preceded by Peter Ingham	Bishop of Wollongong; 2018–present	Succeeded by Incumbent
