= Joanne McCarthy (journalist) =

Australian journalist

Joanne McCarthy AM
- Born: Joanne Maree Therese McCarthy; Gosford, New South Wales
- Occupation: Journalist
- Employer: The Newcastle Herald
- Awards: Gold Walkley; Walkley Award

Joanne Maree Therese McCarthy AM is an Australian investigative journalist. Working for The Newcastle Herald, McCarthy wrote more than 1,000 articles on Catholic Church child sex abuse cases in the Hunter region. McCarthy's journalism was a decisive factor in Julia Gillard's decision to announce the Royal Commission into Institutional Responses to Child Sexual Abuse.

== Life and career ==
The oldest of 11 children, McCarthy grew up in a Catholic family and attended Catholic and public schools. Following a brief period of working as a nurse at the Royal Prince Alfred Hospital, she began her journalism career with a cadetship at the Gosford Star in 1980 before moving to the Central Coast Express Advocate. In 2002, she joined The Newcastle Herald.

The Newcastle Herald journalist Jeff Corbett had been reporting on the Catholic Church scandals around Father Vincent Ryan and Father Jim Fletcher. Following Ryan's conviction and sentencing in 1996, Corbett wrote that "The file is closed, apparently. But it should not be. The Catholic Church is yet to explain how it is one of its priests was able to prey on boys while he was transferred from one parish to another."

Corbett continued pursuing the priests and their superiors but McCarthy observed that charges against Father Guy Hartcher and Father John Denham received little publicity. Working alone but backed by editors Roger Brock and Chad Watson, McCarthy embarked on one of the longest running investigations any Australian newspaper has ever seen.

=== Catholic child sex abuse cases ===
In 2005, The Newcastle Herald assigned McCarthy to cover the sentencing of Father James Fletcher who had been convicted on multiple counts of sexual abuse against an altar boy named Daniel Feenan. McCarthy filed a brief report. In 2007, her editor asked her to look into falling numbers of children being enrolled in Catholic schools in the Hunter region. During a ring around, she was told it probably had something to do with "all the child sexual abuse stuff".

McCarthy started looking at The Newcastle Herald's coverage of the Father Vincent Ryan case in 1995. Ryan was the first Catholic priest in the Hunter region to be charged with child sexual abuse and one of the first in the world to be convicted. She discovered that many of the cases had not been followed up as they were often settled out of court. Her colleague Jeff Corbett faced criticism from the Catholic Church when he challenged the church's claim that Ryan was a lone rogue priest.

==== Bishop Leo Clarke and Monsignor Patrick Cotter ====
Her investigation led her to Monsignor Patrick Cotter who, it was alleged, concealed the child sexual abuse of Father Vincent Ryan for decades. McCarthy discovered church files and letters which showed that Cotter had known about Ryan's offending and did nothing to protect the children in his care. This knowledge explained why some of Ryan's victims received substantial compensation in comparison to other cases.

A police interview conducted by Constable Troy Grant ended with a recommendation that Monsignor Cotter be charged. The Director of Public Prosecutions decided that Cotter, who was then 82 and in poor health, was unfit to stand trial. McCarthy's story on Cotter ran on the front page of The Newcastle Herald.

She was inundated with calls about other priests. One informant was John Feenan, who at the time was in a senior position in the Diocese of Maitland-Newcastle. Feenan had been tasked with paying compensation to the victims of Father Ryan and had recently discovered that his own son, Daniel, had been sexually abused by Father Denis McAlinden. McCarthy began investigating McAlinden and discovered that he targeted girls between the ages of four and twelve and often families with many daughters. She also discovered that McAlinden's superiors in the church knew about his offending.

==== Papal apology ====
In 2008, Pope Benedict XVI visited Australia for World Youth Day. It marked a change in approach for McCarthy, when she went from investigating to campaigning. She rang the organisers to enquire if the Pope would be making an apology to Australian victims of child sexual abuse. Having received an unsatisfactory response, she called the Vatican. She spoke to the papal nuncio in Australia who dismissed her out of hand.

With the Vatican ignoring her, McCarthy sent her questions to Bishop Michael Malone. Malone supported the idea of a papal apology and told her that he had even put it to the Australian Bishops Conference. Two other bishops also supported a papal apology. McCarthy ran Malone's demand for an apology on the front page of The Newcastle Herald.

On 19 July 2008, Pope Benedict delivered a sermon at St Mary's Cathedral, Sydney. He said "Here I would like to pause to acknowledge the shame which we have all felt as a result of the sexual abuse of minors by some clergy and religious in this country. Indeed, I am deeply sorry for the pain and suffering the victims have endured and I assure them that as their pastor I too share their suffering."

As the McCarthy and the Herald chipped away, the work of Strike Force Georgina, launched in 2007 by Lake Macquarie police to pursue allegations of child sexual abuse perpetrated by Catholic priests, was also gaining traction. An increasing number of priests were being charged and The Newcastle Herald was able to cover the resultant court cases.

By 2014, Strike Force Georgina had laid 480 charges against 14 alleged offenders and more than 350 witness statements had been obtained. Father John Denham and Father Tom Brennan were convicted and Father John Houston pleaded guilty to filming a 14 year old boy in public showers. Brother Bernard McGrath was fighting extradition after he was charged with more than 250 charges.

Rod Quinn, McCarthy's editor, instructed her to get proof, saying "... I want to nail the bastards, I don't want any allegations in here". In early 2010, victims of Father Denis McAlinden made to contact with McCarthy, providing her with letters to McAlinden from Bishop Leo Clarke, saying the church was going to laicise him, referring to the "grave nature" of his offending. Clarke added that, despite his offending, his good name would be protected by the confidentiality of the process. McCarthy realised the cover-up went all the way to the top.

Clarke did not laicise McAlinden but allowed him to continue his offending before he was tracked down in Western Australia twenty years later. He died before facing any charges. McCarthy provided Strike Force Georgiana with the documents.

Following that meeting, Strike Force Georgiana stopped taking her calls. She was later told they were not going to look into Clarke's failure to report McAlinden. McCarthy contacted Detective Peter Fox, who had previously interviewed Bishop Clarke about McAlinden in 2002.

==== John Pirona ====
In July 2012, New South Wales fireman John Pirona went missing. McCarthy knew Pirona had been a victim of Father John Sidney Denham, the child abuser from the St Pius X School in Adamstown. Denham had been convicted of child sexual abuse in 2000, 2010 and 2015. In 2010, he had been jailed for 19 years and 10 months. This was later increased to 19 years and 5 months. McCarthy had previously met Pirona and immediately after it had been announced he was missing, she visited his wife Tracey. McCarthy said that if Tracey Pirona was to ask for a royal commission, it would be very significant. She agreed and McCarthy ran his story the following day. Pirona's body was discovered 8 August 2012 and during his funeral, his father Lou reiterated the families' support for a Royal Commission.

The headline on the front page of The Newcastle Herald read "Too Much Pain", words Pirona had written in his suicide note. In September 2012, Greens MP David Shoebridge, who had the portfolio of Justice, Attorney-General and Police, convened a public forum at the Newcastle Workers Club to discuss the need for a royal commission. Peter FitzSimons was the keynote speaker and both McCarthy and Fox spoke.

Fox would later go on national television and tell Lateline host Tony Jones that he had been told to stop investigating complaints of sexual abuse against Catholic priests, including McAlinden. On 9 September 2012, the New South Wales Premier, Barry O'Farrell, announced that there would be a Special Commission of Inquiry into Fox's allegations conducted by Deputy Crown Prosecutor Margaret Cunneen SC. The terms of reference required her to investigate why Fox had been stood down from sex abuse cases and the extent to which Catholic church leaders had co-operated with, hindered or obstructed any investigations.

==== Royal Commission into Institutional Responses to Child Sexual Abuse ====
On 11 November 2012, Australian prime minister Julia Gillard announced a royal commission into the responses of institutions to child sexual abuse. McCarthy wrote Gillard a personal letter, sharing an email she had received from an aunt of John Pirona which said that "You'll never know the significance of what you've done but if you do nothing else, you've done that."

Acknowledgement for McCarthy's and The Newcastle Herald's role in bringing about the royal commission would come from Gillard herself a year later. On the evening that she lost the prime ministership to Kevin Rudd, Gillard wrote to McCarthy in the final few minutes as prime minister.

In February 2013. McCarthy reported on the story of Audrey Nash, an 89-year-old lifelong Catholic whose son Andrew who hanged himself in his bedroom in 1974 after being sexually assaulted by Brother Francis William Cable, a Marist Brother teacher at Andrew's school. Cable was convicted in 2015 of abusing 19 boys at the school.

In 2013, McCarthy's reporting and campaigning won her the Gold Walkley and Graham Perkin Award.

Cuneen delivered her report in March 2014 and found that police had been told not to speak to media and specifically to McCarthy. Cuneen also found that Fox had acted inappropriately when he provided her with a witness statement making allegations against McAlinden and exaggerated evidence, had been deliberately untruthful and had developed an obsession with the Catholic Church and alleged conspiracies.

In 2015, McCarthy received an honorary doctorate from the University of Newcastle for her work exposing child sexual abuse in the region.

== Vaginal mesh scandal ==
McCarthy reported extensively on Australia's vaginal mesh scandal, where thousands of women had been implanted with pelvic mesh in public and private hospitals in the 1980s and 1990s. Despite doctors sounding the alarm about severe complications, manufacturers continued to market the devices. McCarthy's investigation spanned three years and more than 80 articles.

In April 2020, after 40 years, McCarthy resigned from The Newcastle Herald. In her farewell column, she said that "a Bishop's stupid comments a few weeks ago set in train a series of events that ended up with a resignation ... after 14 years of writing about the Catholic Church's crimes, I'm going to leave stupid to the people who can't seem to see it."

== Awards and recognition ==
- Graham Perkin Australian Journalist of the Year Award (2012)
- Gold Walkley Award (2013)
- NSW Kennedy Award, Journalist of the Year (2013)
- Sir Owen Dixon Chambers Law Reporting of the Year Award (2013)
- Walkley Award, Public Service Journalism (2017)
- Chris Watson Award for Outstanding Regional Newspaper Reporting (2019)
- Member of the Order of Australia (2022)
