= Sacred Heart Cathedral, Hamilton =

Cathedral church in New South Wales, Australia

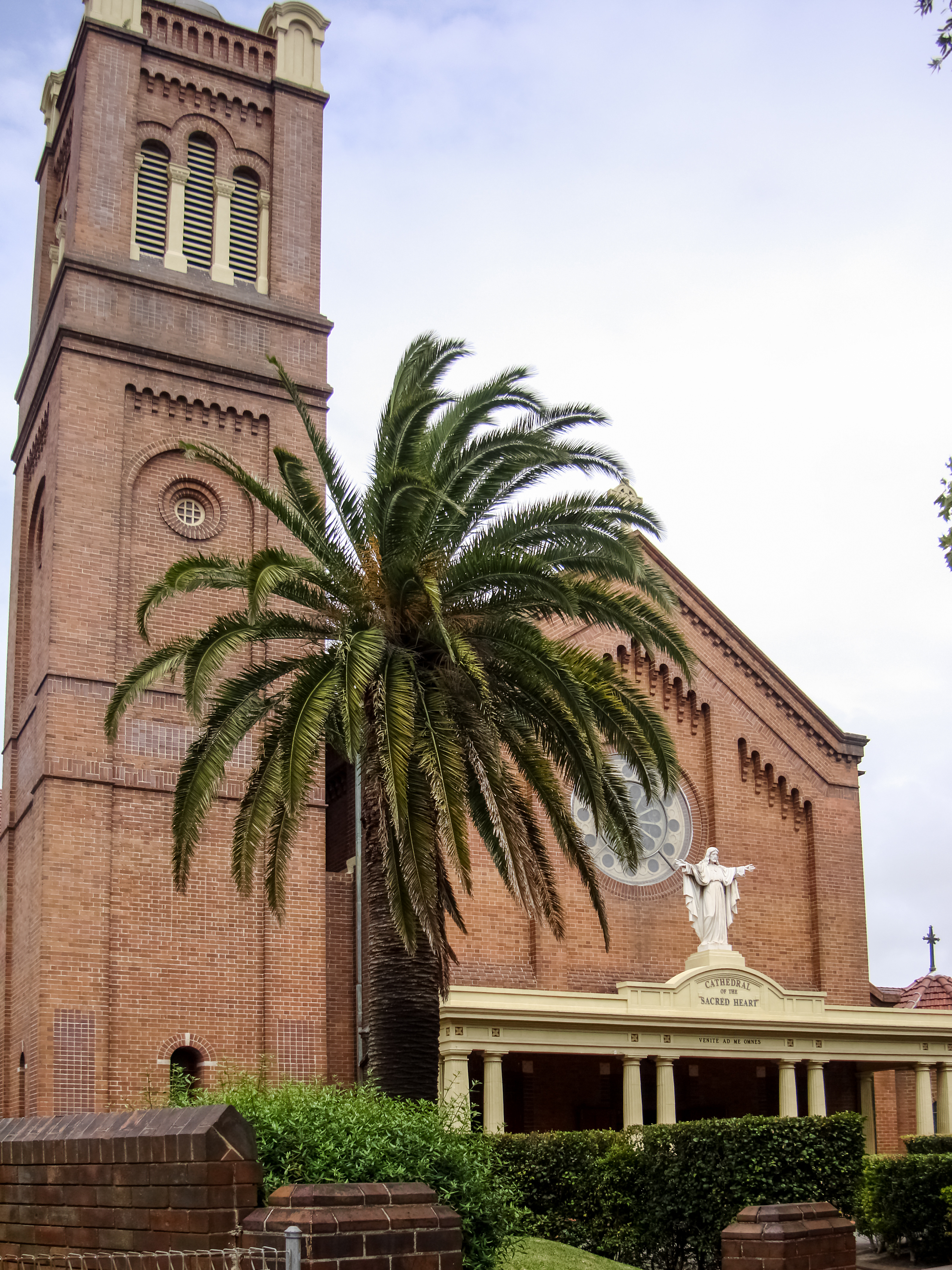

Religion
- Affiliation: Roman Catholic Latin Rite
- District: Diocese of Maitland-Newcastle
- Ecclesiastical or organizational status: Cathedral
- Leadership: Bishop Michael Kennedy
- Year consecrated: 12 September 1941 (as Sacred Heart Church); 16 July 1995 (as Sacred Heart Cathedral)

Location
- Location: Hamilton, New South Wales, Australia
- Interactive map of Sacred Heart Cathedral, Hamilton
- Coordinates: 32°55′23″S 151°45′14″E

Architecture
- Architect: Peter Joseph Gannon
- Type: Church
- Groundbreaking: 23 September 1928 (initial foundation stone laid)
- Completed: 1 December 1929

Website
- sacredhearthamilton.org.au

Sacred Heart Cathedral, Hamilton, is the cathedral church of the Roman Catholic Diocese of Maitland-Newcastle and the seat and residence of the Catholic Bishop of Maitland-Newcastle, New South Wales, Australia. The position is currently held by Bishop Michael Kennedy, who was installed on 2 February 2023 following the death of Bishop William Wright on 13 November 2021.

== History ==
Construction began on the Church of the Sacred Heart in 1928, in the midst of the Great Depression. The parish priest, Monsignor Victor Francis Peters, was heavily influenced by the architecture of the Cathedral of the Assumption in Thurles in Ireland, where he had been a seminarian. He was also influenced by the Cathedral Basilica of Saints Peter and Paul in Philadelphia, USA and the brick work in front of the Pisa church in Italy. Due to the financial constraints of the Great Depression, the church was largely built thanks to the generosity of parishioners, who helped to physically dig the foundations and donated bricks at a cost of two pence a brick. A donation of ten pounds was the norm. The foundation stone for the church was laid on 23 September 1928, the first brick was laid on 1 February 1929 and the last brick was put in place 10 months later on 1 December 1929. In total 700,000 bricks were used. The Church of the Sacred Heart was officially opened in 1930 as the parish church of Hamilton. It was consecrated by Bishop Edmund Gleeson on 12 September 1941.

=== Cathedral ===
During 1989 Newcastle earthquake, which killed 13 people and injured more than 160 others, the church's bell tower was considerably damaged. The original concrete dome on the church was replaced by a copper dome. The original dome now stand as a memorial to those who lost their lives in the earthquake. The earthquake also significantly damaged St. John's Pro-Cathedral in Maitland. Due to the damage, and the change in population movement towards the coast, Bishop Leo Clarke petitioned Rome to make the Church of the Sacred Heart the diocese's new cathedral. The petition also requested the diocese be renamed the Catholic Diocese of Maitland-Newcastle. Previously it had been named the Diocese of Maitland.

On 14 June 1995, by Papal Brief, the Catholic Diocese of Maitland-Newcastle was created and on 16 July 1995, the Sacred Heart Church in Hamilton became the Sacred Heart Cathedral.
