= Michael Malone (bishop) =

The Most Reverend Michael Malone
- Bishop Emeritus of the Roman Catholic Diocese of Maitland-Newcastle
- Diocese: Maitland-Newcastle
- Appointed: 12 December 1994
- Installed: 3 November 1995
- Term ended: 4 April 2011
- Predecessor: Leo Clarke
- Successor: William Wright

Orders
- Ordination: 18 July 1964 by Cardinal Norman Gilroy
- Consecration: 15 February 1995 by Bishop Leo Clarke

Personal details
- Born: Michael John Malone; 23 October 1939 (age 87) Willoughby, Sydney, Australia
- Denomination: Roman Catholic
- Motto: Lux et Veritas (Light and Truth)

Styles of Michael Malone
- Reference style: The Most Reverend
- Spoken style: My Lord
- Religious style: Bishop

Michael Malone (born 23 October 1939) is the bishop emeritus of the Roman Catholic Diocese of Maitland-Newcastle. He was previously coadjutor bishop of the diocese and prior to that, had been a priest for the Roman Catholic Archdiocese of Sydney. He retired in 2011, saying he had been emotionally drained by the scale of sexual abuse within the diocese.

== Early life ==
Malone was born in Willoughby on Sydney's North Shore in 1939. He entered seminary as an 18-year-old and was ordained to the diaconate in 1963. On 18 July 1964, he was ordained to the priesthood by Cardinal Norman Gilroy at St Mary's Cathedral, Sydney, alongside future Bishop of Wollongong, Peter Ingham.

== Priesthood ==
Malone's first appointment was as an assistant priest in Annandale parish in 1965. His appointment came as the first documents following the Second Vatican Council were released and spearheading the transformation of the liturgy and practices within his parish during this time formed a key part of his early ministry.

== Episcopacy ==
On 12 December 1994, Pope John Paul II appointed Malone as the coadjutor bishop of the Roman Catholic Diocese of Maitland-Newcastle. He was consecrated on 15 February 1995 and succeeded Bishop Leo Clarke on 3 November 1995, following his retirement.

In March 2009, Malone was barred from performing a joint Catholic-Anglican confirmation rite after the Holy See intervened. The Congregation for Divine Worship said the proposed service could result in "confusing messages being given to the people."

=== Response to sexual abuse ===
In 2008, Malone made a public apology to victims of sexual abuse at the hands of priests in the Diocese of Maitland-Newcastle. Despite the apology, Malone's handling of paedophile priests during his time as Bishop of Maitland-Newcastle has been criticised.

In 2002, Malone moved Father James Fletcher, who was being investigated by police of paedophilia, to a parish with a primary and secondary school, without disclosing any of the allegations against him. He told the NSW 2013 Special Commission of Inquiry, "We had no-one else to put in."

During the 2013 NSW Special Commission of Inquiry's investigation, Malone admitted he was out of his depth in dealing with matters of child protection during his 16 years as Bishop. He said he turned a blind eye to decades of complaints against Father Dennis McAlinden, a prolific paedophile priest who abused children for over sixty years in the diocese, because "...the whole area of sexual abuse is so distasteful that I would have found it unpalatable".

== Retirement ==
In September 2009, Malone revealed he had asked the Vatican to appoint a coadjutor bishop so he could depart after "15 difficult years", five years short of the normative retirement age of 75. On 4 April 2011, Pope Benedict XVI accepted his resignation and appointed William Wright to succeed him as Bishop of Maitland-Newcastle.

Following his resignation, Malone said: "I'm proud that I have confronted the issues as strongly as I have, the issues of sexual abuse."

Catholic Church titles
Preceded by Leo Clarke	Bishop of Maitland-Newcastle; 1995–2011	Succeeded by William Wright
