= Ashmont =

Ashmont can mean:

- Ashmont, Alberta, a hamlet in Canada
- Ashmont, Boston, a section of the Dorchester neighborhood of Boston, Massachusetts
  - Ashmont (MBTA station), an MBTA subway station located here
- Ashmont, New South Wales, a suburb of Wagga Wagga in Australia
