= Patrick Cotter (priest) =

Roman Catholic priest

The Very Reverend Monsignor Patrick Cotter
- Church: Roman Catholic
- Diocese: Maitland-Newcastle
- Appointed: Priest (1938-1975); Vicar capitular (1975-1976); Vicar general (1976-1979); Monsignor (1979 - 2007)
- Term ended: 2007

Personal details
- Born: Patrick Daniel Cotter; 1914 County Cork, Ireland
- Died: 28 July 2007 (aged 92–93)
- Denomination: Roman Catholic

Patrick Daniel Cotter (1914 – 28 July 2007) was an Irish-born Catholic priest who was incardinated in the Roman Catholic Diocese of Maitland-Newcastle in Australia from 1938 to 2007.

During two major inquiries into child sexual abuse in the diocese, Cotter was found to have had knowledge of serious allegations against at least three priests. Despite hearing admissions by the accused priests and receiving multiple complaints from teachers, parents and children, Cotter did not report anything to police. The accused priests went on to abuse scores of children.

== Life and career ==
Born in County Cork, Ireland, in 1914, Cotter was ordained as a priest in 1937 after studying in Italy. Cotter immigrated to Australia in 1938 and served in a variety of positions in the Diocese of Maitland-Newcastle under Bishop Edmund Gleeson (1931-1956) and Bishop John Toohey (1956-1975). When Toohey died, Cotter was appointed vicar capitular pending the appointment of a new bishop. Leo Clarke was ordained bishop of the diocese in June 1976 and Cotter served as his vicar general from 1976 to 1979.

== Concealment of child sex abuse ==
The Royal Commission into Institutional Responses to Child Sexual Abuse found that Cotter had significant knowledge of sex crimes committed by priests in his diocese. Along with the three bishops he served under, Cotter did not report any of the child sexual abuse he had knowledge of to police. In 1996, NSW Police attempted to charge Cotter with concealing a crime but the Director of Public Prosecutions considered him too old to stand trial.

The Special Commission of Inquiry found Cotter had concealed the sexual abuse of many priests in the diocese over decades. Specifically, Cotter had significant knowledge about the offending of Father Denis McAlinden, Father James Fletcher and Father Vincent Ryan.

Despite multiple complaints and Ryan and McAlinden's own admissions of their abuse of children directly to Cotter, he did not report the crimes to police. In an attempt to cure their abusive behaviour and also protect the church from scandal, Cotter sent McAlinden and Ryan to psychologists. Both men returned to ministry and continued to abuse scores of children.

Church officials had extensive knowledge of the serious risk Father Denis McAlinden posed to children. There had been complaints about his sexual abusing of young girls as far back as 1954. The church moved McAlinden from parish to parish, then to Western Australia and finally to Ireland, Papua New Guinea and the Philippines. Church documents obtained during the Special Commission of Inquiry showed that church officials, including Cotter, knew about McAlinden's crimes and did nothing to protect the children in their care.

Following the arrest of Father Vincent Ryan in 1995, Ryan told police that Cotter had arranged for his removal from Newcastle to Melbourne to seek psychiatric help. During the execution of search warrants in Newcastle, police discovered documents indicating Cotter had significant knowledge of Ryan's sexual abuse of children as early as 1974 and 1975.

In 1996, police prepared a brief of evidence to prosecute Cotter on charges of having concealed Ryan's sexual abuse of children. Detective Senior Constable Troy Grant led the investigation and interviewed Cotter and Bishop Leo Clarke. Grant recommended that Cotter should be prosecuted. The Director of Public Prosecutions did not proceed with the case as they considered 82-year-old Cotter too elderly to prosecute.

On 11 October 1997, Cotter attempted to get local journalist Jeff Corbet and The Newcastle Herald newspaper to stop running stories on Ryan. Corbet refused.

Cotter died on 28 July 2007. On 7 August 2007, Bishop Michael Malone and a large number of priests and nuns celebrated his funeral. During the service, Malone described Cotter as a "dearly loved uncle, grand uncle and fellow priest". Malone's eulogy for Cotter caused distress to victims of Ryan, who were aware that Cotter had concealed Ryan's abusing since 1974, allowing Ryan to continue sexually abusing boys for another two decades.

Following Cotter's funeral, the journalist Joanne McCarthy wrote the first of several articles on how Cotter failed to act on serious allegations of child sexual abuse. The publicity generated by the reports in The Newcastle Herald led hundreds more victims to come forward, leading to the convictions of more priests from the diocese.

In response to McCarthy's articles, Bishop Malone wrote an unpublished article called "Trial by Media" calling The Newcastle Herald "the enemy". Malone launched personal attacks on Joanne McCarthy, accusing the journalist of attacking priests, orchestrating a concerted attack on the diocese, colluding with police and attacking the recently deceased Bishop Leo Clarke and Father Denis McAlinden, one of Australia's most prolific child abusers.

In a statement to parishioners in September 2007, Bishop Malone admitted that "Monsignor Patrick Cotter has been judged negligent and suspicion of cover-ups hang over Bishop Leo Clarke and myself. With the benefit of hindsight more could have been done to confront sexual abuse in the church. I truly regret that this did not happen and approach these matters with greater understanding these days."

Bishop William Wright has acknowledged the failure of leadership in his diocese, notably of Cotter and Bishop Leo Clarke roles in failing to protect children by concealing the abuse of many priests. Wright delivered a public apology as part of the Cunneen Special Commission of Inquiry in 2013 and in evidence under oath during the royal commission in 2014.

In 2019, Sarah Ferguson interviewed Bishop Bill Wright. During the interview, Wright admitted that in 1974, Father Vincent Ryan had confessed some of his crimes to Cotter and that Cotter did not report this information to the police.

== See also ==
- Revelation (TV series)
