= Edmund Gleeson =

Australian Catholic bishop (1869–1956)

The Most Reverend Edmund Gleeson CSsR
- Bishop of Maitland
- Diocese: Maitland
- Installed: 28 March 1931
- Term ended: 4 March 1956
- Predecessor: Patrick Vincent Dwyer
- Successor: John Thomas Toohey
- Other post: Titular Bishop of Vatarba (1929–1931)

Orders
- Ordination: 1 December 1918 at St Carthage's Cathedral, Lismore by John Joseph Carroll
- Consecration: 30 August 1931 at St Carthage's Cathedral, Lismore by Bartolomeo Cattaneo

Personal details
- Born: Edmund John Aloysius Gleeson; 15 January 1869 Dualla, County Tipperary, Ireland
- Died: 4 March 1956 (aged 87) Mayfield, New South Wales, Australia
- Denomination: Catholic Church
- Occupation: Catholic bishop
- Motto: Passio Christi Conforta me (Passion of Christ strengthen me)

Edmund John Aloysius Gleeson (15 January 1869 – 4 March 1956) was an Australian bishop of the Catholic Church who was Bishop of Maitland for 25 years and was the head of the Redemptorists in Australia for 17 years.

== Early life ==
Gleeson was born in Dualla, Ireland in 1869. He came from a highly religious family. While his father was a farmer and blacksmith, three of his uncles were lay brothers of the Congregation of the Most Holy Redeemer. Gleeson was the eldest of five children born to Timothy Gleeson and all four pursued a religious vocation. Two of his sisters became nuns in Australia (one with the Missionaries of the Sacred Heart and the other with the Sisters of Mercy) and one brother became a lay brother at the Redemptorist Monastery, Mayfield. Another brother died while pursuing studies for the priesthood.

While in secondary school at Rockwell College, Cashel being taught by the Holy Ghost Fathers, Gleeson's mother passed away. His father moved the family to Australia but left Gleeson in Ireland to continue his stories. He then proceeded to St Patrick's Ecclesiastical College, Thurles to study for the priesthood. Upon graduating from seminary, the President predicted of him: "There goes a future Bishop". Gleeson's father, Timothy, following the death of his wife, joined the Congregation of the Most Holy Redeemer in Waratah, New South Wales as a brother. He died in 1914.

== Priesthood ==
Gleeson was ordained to the priesthood on 18 June 1893 at Cathedral of the Assumption, Thurles by Archbishop Thomas William Croke. He left immediately for Australia and arrived in the Diocese of Maitland on 21 November 1893.

His first appointment was as assistant priest at St Mary's Church, Newcastle. In 1896, he was assistant at St John's Pro-Cathedral, Maitland and served there for five years. In 1900, he returned to St Mary's Church, Newcastle as administrator.

In 1904, Gleeson was given leave to return to Ireland to join the Congregation of the Most Holy Redeemer, the order to which three of his uncles and one of his brother's belonged.

In 1912, he returned to Australia and was appointed Higher Superior of all the Redemptorists in Australia, New Zealand and the Philippines. As Superior, he erected the juniorate at St Clement's, Galong, a house of studies in Pennant Hills, and a mission house in Oxford Park, Brisbane.

When Gleeson took over as Superior, any Redemptorist student for the priesthood had to travel to Ireland or Belgium to complete their studies. He bulked up the teaching staff and at the time of his episcopal appointment, there were 40 students preparing for priestly ordination in the order.

== Episcopate ==
On 31 May 1929, Gleeson was appointed Coadjutor Bishop of Maitland, the Diocese to which he had been ordained. He was 60 years old.

On 15 September 1929, he was consecrated as bishop at St John's Pro-Cathedral, Maitland by Archbishop Michael Kelly. Thousands of people attended but were unable to fit inside so stood on the street listening through speakers erected outside the cathedral.

On 5 October 1929, Gleeson performed his first ordinations, ordaining four priests for the Redemptorist Order at the house of studies he'd established in Pennant Hills.

On 28 March 1931, he became Bishop of Maitland following the death of his predecessor Bishop Patrick Vincent Dwyer.

In 1933, Gleeson announced the Catholic Hall in Maitland would be converted to a Pro-Cathedral, doubling the capacity of the old cathedral.

On 11 March 1948, he was given a Coadjutor Bishop, Bishop John Thomas Toohey.

== Death ==
He moved into the Redemptorist Monastery in Mayfield where he died on 4 March 1956.

Catholic Church titles
| Preceded by Patrick Vincent Dwyer | Bishop of Maitland; 1931–1956 | Succeeded by John Thomas Toohey |
