= John Toohey (bishop) =

Australian Roman Catholic prelate (1905–1975)

His Excellency John Thomas Toohey
- Bishop of Maitland
- Metropolis: Sydney
- Installed: 4 March 1956
- Term ended: 24 September 1975
- Predecessor: Edmund John Aloysius Gleeson, CSSR
- Successor: Leo Morris Clarke
- Previous post: Titular Bishop of Verinopolis

Orders
- Ordination: 30 November 1927 by Michael Kelly
- Consecration: 4 April 1948 by Norman Gilroy

Personal details
- Born: 30 January 1905 Glebe, New South Wales
- Died: 24 September 1975 (aged 70) Maitland, New South Wales
- Motto: Per crucem ad lucem

John Thomas Toohey (30 January 1905 – 24 September 1975) was an Australian Roman Catholic prelate. He was appointed coadjutor bishop of Bishop of Maitland and titular bishop of Verinopolis from 1948 to 1956. He succeeded as bishop on 4 March 1956. He died in office in Maitland, New South Wales on 24 September 1975 at the age of 70. Many years after Bishop Toohey's death, it was discovered that he covered up for a priest in his diocese who had committed sexual abuse against minors.

Catholic Church titles
Preceded by Jean-Marie Cessou	Titular Bishop of Verinopolis; 1948–1956	Succeeded by Serafim Fernandes de Araújo
Preceded by Edmund John Aloysius Gleeson	Bishop of Maitland; 1956–1975	Succeeded by Leo Clarke
