= Luc Julian Matthys =

Belgian-born Australian Roman Catholic bishop (1935–2021)

- Bishop of Armidale
- Church: Catholic Church
- Diocese: Diocese of Armidale
- In office: 17 March 1999 – 7 December 2011
- Predecessor: Kevin Manning
- Successor: Michael Kennedy

Orders
- Ordination: 2 December 1961 by Hugh Boyle
- Consecration: 14 May 1999 by Edward Clancy

Personal details
- Born: 3 May 1935 Drongen, East Flanders, Belgium
- Died: 26 January 2021 (aged 85) Tamworth, New South Wales, Australia

Luc Julian Matthys (3 May 1935 – 26 January 2021) was a Belgian-born Australian Roman Catholic bishop.

== Early life ==
Matthys was born in Drongen, Ghent, Belgium on 3 May 1935, the youngest of four children born to Antoine Henri Alfons Marie and Agnes Paulina Matthys. His sister, Magda, passed away as an infant. His father was an engineer and his mother, a teacher.

During World War II, the family was forced to flee Belgium after Germany invaded, living in France as refugees. Following the collapse of France, they returned to Belgium and lived there until 1947 when they migrated to South Africa. He completed his secondary education at Brothers of Charity College in Pietersburg and joined the St John Vianney Regional Seminary in Pretoria.

His family later migrated to Australia over time. His brother Marc moved in 1961, he other brother Jozef in 1964 and finally his parents in 1967.

== Priesthood ==
Matthys was ordained a priest for the Diocese of Johannesburg on 2 December 1961 at Boksburg by Bishop Hugh Boyle.

He migrated to Australia, following his family, and was incardinated into the Archdiocese of Melbourne in 1976. In Melbourne, he served as an assistant priest at Mount Waverley and Dandenong. He then became Parish Priest at Blackburn and in 1998, was appointed Dean at St Patrick’s Cathedral.

He was a member of the Australian Confraternity of Catholic Clergy. Upon his elevation to the episcopate, he became the first member of the Confraternity to be appointed a bishop.

== Episcopate ==
On 17 March 1999, Matthys was appointed Bishop of Armidale by Pope John Paul II. He was consecrated on 14 May 1999 at Saints Mary and Joseph Catholic Cathedral, Armidale by Cardinal Edward Bede Clancy.

During his first year in his new diocese, hie visited every parish in the Diocese.

In the 10 years prior to his appointment, only two men were ordained to the priesthood for the Diocese of Armidale. He set about ensuring the Diocese would have adequate clergy, promoting vocations and bringing in foreign priests from overseas to fill relieve shortages. He ordained six men to the priesthood in his 12 years as bishop and one permanent deacon.

Matthys established Centacare New England North West (NENW) in 2001 to extend counselling services to families and children of the Diocese of Armidale.

During his time as Bishop, he performed over 5,000 confirmations, while 7,000 baptisms were performed during his episcopate.

== Retirement and death ==
In 2010, Matthys reached the canonical retirement age of 75 and tendered his resignation. It was only accepted 18 months later on 7 December 2011, when Bishop Michael Robert Kennedy was appointed.

On 25 January 2021, Matthys suffered a stroke and was admitted to Tamworth Base Hospital. He died the next day, on Australia Day. His funeral was held on 5 February 2011 at Saints Mary and Joseph Catholic Cathedral, Armidale.
