= Moorong, New South Wales =

Moorong Wagga Wagga, New South Wales
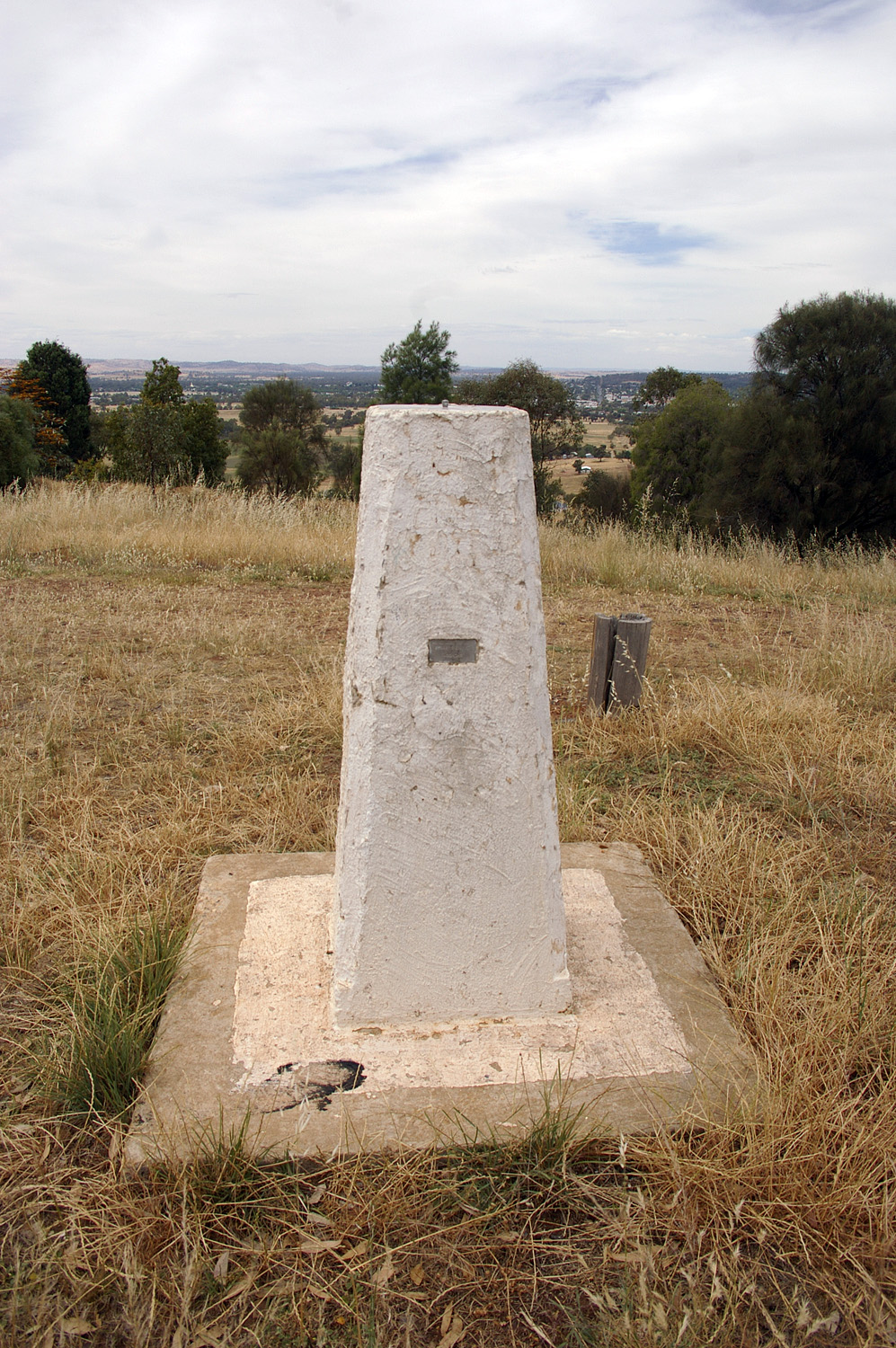
- Moorong Geodetic Station on top of Mount Moorong.

- Coordinates: 35°6′50.64″S 147°18′54.96″E
- Population: 177 (2016 census)
- Postcode(s): 2650
- LGA(s): City of Wagga Wagga
- County: Wynyard
- Parish: South Wagga Wagga
- State electorate(s): Wagga Wagga
- Federal division(s): Riverina
Suburbs around Moorong:
Malebo	Gobbagombalin	Gobbagombalin
San Isidore	Moorong	Wagga Wagga
San Isidore	Kapooka	Ashmont

Moorong, is a small suburb west of Wagga Wagga, New South Wales, Australia. The suburb is named after the pastoral property "Moorong" which is an Aboriginal word for the Wiradjuri Tribe meaning "Bleak" or "Cold" with other meanings "Bark Shelter" and "Camping Ground". Flowerdale Lagoon and Pomingalarna Reserve are located within the suburb.
