= Michael Kennedy (bishop) =

Australian priest

The Most Reverend Michael Kennedy
- Bishop of the Roman Catholic Diocese of Maitland-Newcastle
- Diocese: Maitland-Newcastle
- Appointed: 2 February 2023
- Predecessor: William Wright

Orders
- Ordination: 14 August 1999 by Bishop William John Brennan
- Consecration: 9 February 2012 by Bishop Luc Julian Matthys

Personal details
- Born: Michael Kennedy; 13 May 1968 (age 58) Wagga Wagga, Australia
- Denomination: Roman Catholic
- Education: Vianney College Pontificio Collegio Urbano de Propaganda Fide Marianum
- Motto: Euntes Docete (Go out and teach)
- Coat of arms

Styles of Michael Kennedy
- Reference style: The Most Reverend
- Spoken style: My Lord
- Religious style: Bishop

Michael Robert Kennedy (born 13 May 1968) is an Australian prelate of the Catholic Church who was appointed bishop of the Diocese of Maitland-Newcastle in February 2023. He was bishop of Armidale from 2012 to 2023.

== Early life ==
Kennedy was born in Wagga Wagga on 13 May 1968 and was the youngest of the nine children of John Kennedy and his wife Fidelma (nee Madden). He received his primary education in a small, two-class country school at San Isidore, a small rural suburb outside of Wagga Wagga. He later attended the Wagga Christian Brothers High School.

After completing high school, he obtained a Diploma in Education and taught at Xavier High School in Albury for three years. He entered Vianney College, the seminary for the Roman Catholic Diocese of Wagga Wagga in 1992. He would continue his studies in Rome, obtained a Licentiate in Sacred Theology from the Pontificio Collegio Urbano de Propaganda Fide and a Diploma of Mariology from the Marianum.

== Priesthood ==
Kennedy was ordained a priest for the Roman Catholic Diocese of Wagga Wagga on 14 August 1999. He was appointed assistant parish priest in Griffith for the first two years of his ministry. In 2001, he became the rector of St Francis’ Residential College at Charles Sturt University. In 2004, he was appointed assistant priest in Albury and in 2007, became the parish priest of Leeton, where he served until he was appointed Bishop of Armidale in 2011.

During his priestly ministry, he used his teaching background to lecture at Vianney College where he taught Moral Theology and Church History. He was also Vicar Forane (Dean) of the Murrumbidgee Deanery.

== Episcopacy ==
=== Armidale ===

On 7 December 2011, Pope Benedict XVI appointed Kennedy the 10th Bishop of Armidale, following the retirement of Bishop Luc Julian Matthys. He was ordained a bishop and installed on 9 February 2012, in a two hour long ceremony at Saints Mary and Joseph Catholic Cathedral in Armidale. His ordination was consecrated by Bishop Matthys and co-consecrated by Archbishop of Sydney George Cardinal Pell and Bishop of Wagga Wagga Gerard Hanna. The ceremony was attended by 1000 people, including 90 priests, 29 bishops and two cardinals.

=== Apostolic Administrator ===
In December 2012, Kennedy was appointed the Apostolic Administrator of the Roman Catholic Diocese of Wilcannia-Forbes, becoming the third person to take over the role following the resignation of Bishop Christopher Henry Toohey in 2009. He remained in this role until July 2014 when Columba Macbeth-Green was ordained and installed as the new bishop of the Diocese of Wilcannia-Forbes.

=== Maitland-Newcastle ===
On 2 February 2023, Pope Francis announced Kennedy had been appointed to be the Bishop of Maitland-Newcastle, which had been without a bishop since the death of Bishop William Wright in November 2021.

== Response to clerical abuse ==
Kennedy has been a strong advocate for standing with and providing redress for victims of clerical abuse, particularly in the Diocese of Armidale. In a piece in The Catholic Weekly, written in 2016, he praised the courage and integrity of victims coming forwards, adding it was "crucial that the Church truly hear their cry". In the same piece, he slammed the Catholic Church's response to responding to clerical abuse, saying it was "completely inept".

Kennedy was a staunch defender of Cardinal George Pell despite the cardinal's conviction for child sexual abuse crimes. Those convictions were later unanimously quashed by the High Court of Australia in 2020.

Following the initial conviction, Kennedy defended the cardinal during a Sunday Mass homily, telling parishioners: "When you and I look at the cardinal’s life isn’t it reasonable to apply today’s gospel and think ‘surely a good tree doesn’t produce rotten fruit but good fruit?’ There are many people who, on the information they have gleaned, cannot understand how the jury could have come to a guilty verdict. The evidence and testimonies, at least those that have come to public knowledge, seem to leave plenty of room for incredulity or ‘reasonable doubt’ to say the least." He also urged parishioners to remember Cardinal Pell in their prayers.

Catholic Church titles
Preceded by William Wright (Australian bishop)	Bishop of Maitland-Newcastle; 2023–present	Incumbent
