= Vincent Ryan (priest) =

Australian Catholic priest (1938–2022)

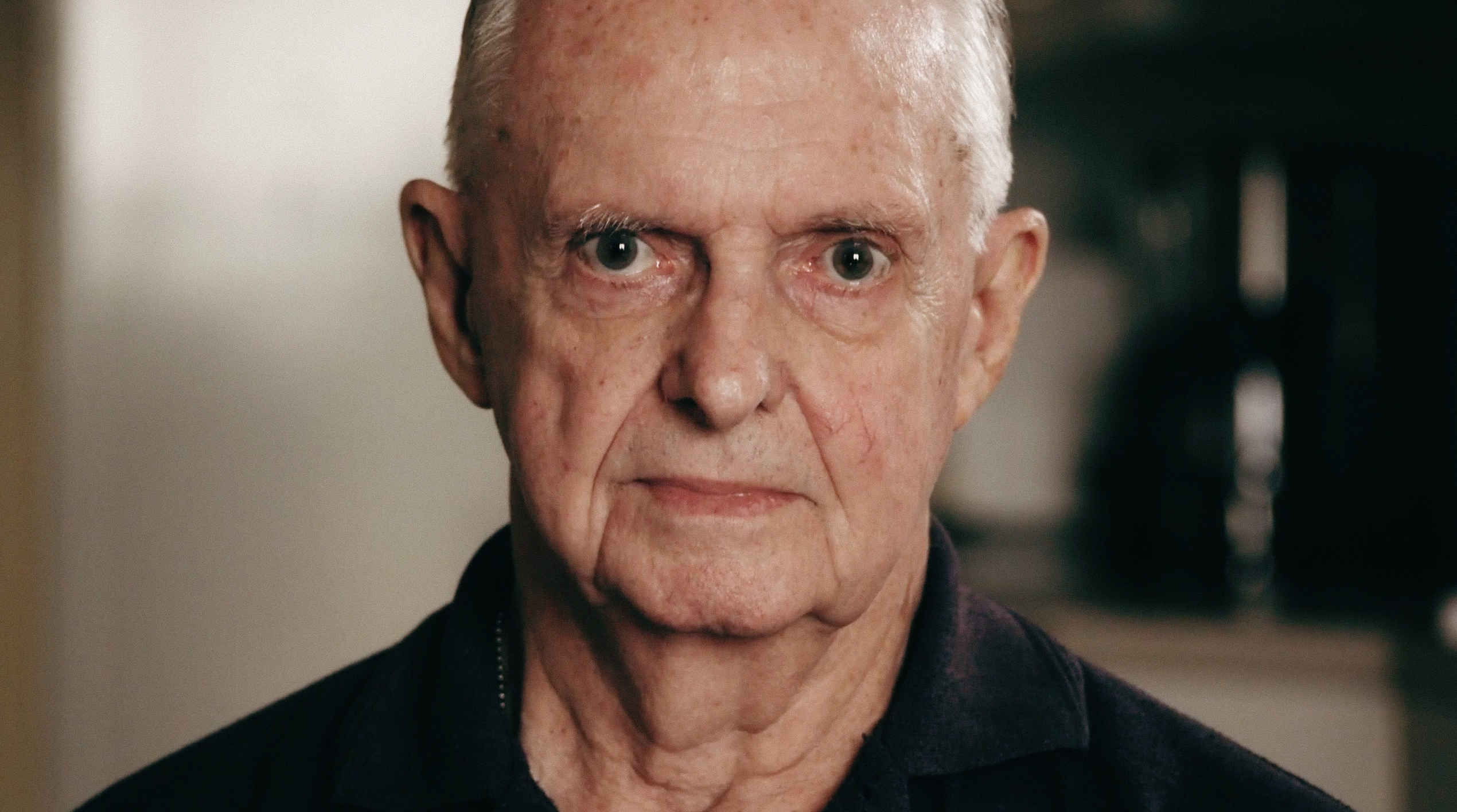
- Ryan in 2020
- Born: Vincent Gerard Ryan; 22 April 1938; Maitland, New South Wales, Australia
- Died: 13 April 2022 (aged 83)
- Occupation: Catholic priest
- Known for: Child sexual abuse
- Status: 2021 (released on parole)
- Penalty: 1996: 6 years; 1997: 16 years, 6 months; 2010: 15 month suspended sentence; 2019: 3 years, 3 months

Details
- Victims: 37+
- State: New South Wales
- Locations: Hamilton; East Gresford; Maitland; Merewether; Newcastle; Cessnock
- Target: Children
- Killed: Multiple suicides
- Imprisoned at: Cooma Correctional Centre; Long Bay Correctional Centre

Vincent Gerard Ryan (22 April 1938 – 13 April 2022) was an Australian Catholic priest convicted of sexually abusing 37 children. He was first charged in October 1995 and sentenced to 14 years imprisonment. Ryan was the first Catholic priest in the Newcastle, New South Wales, region to be charged with child sexual abuse, and one of the first in the world to be convicted of such abuse.

In Case Study 43, the Royal Commission into Institutional Responses to Child Sexual Abuse examined the response of the Roman Catholic Diocese of Maitland-Newcastle to allegations of child sexual abuse against Ryan. The commission found senior leaders in the diocese, including Bishop Leo Clarke and Monsignor Patrick Cotter, had knowledge of Ryan's offending and "abjectly failed to do anything meaningful" to protect the children in the diocese.

Ryan's abuse and Bishop Clarke's attempts to conceal his crimes are featured in the ABC documentary series Revelation.

== Background ==
Ryan was born in Maitland, New South Wales in 1938, where he attended Marist Boys High School from 1950 to 1954. In 1958, Ryan confessed to another priest that he "had desires for young boys" but was assured that if he said his prayers "God would look after him". In 1958, Ryan entered seminary and in 1962 was chosen to complete his studies at Propaganda College in Rome.

On 6 January 1966, Ryan was ordained by Pope Paul VI at St Peter's Basilica, Rome. Ryan returned to Australia on 19 August 1970, after having spent some time working in North London, and was appointed secretary to Bishop John Toohey at Maitland Cathedral. In 1973, Toohey informed Ryan that he was appointing him to St Joseph's Parish, Merewether, New South Wales.

== Complaint by Kath Edwards ==
In 1974, Father Patrick Cotter was parish priest of St Joseph's Church in Merewether and Ryan was his assistant. A parishioner, Kath Edwards (known as "CNA" during the royal commission), told Cotter that her two young boys, aged 6 and 8 years old, had said Ryan had touched them on their genitals. Edwards told the commission that she remembered seeing the colour drain from Cotter's face but, despite his shock, it was not something he was surprised to hear. Cotter summoned Ryan and Edwards repeated her allegation. Ryan admitted he may have touched the boys accidentally but denied abusing the boys. Cotter took no further action.

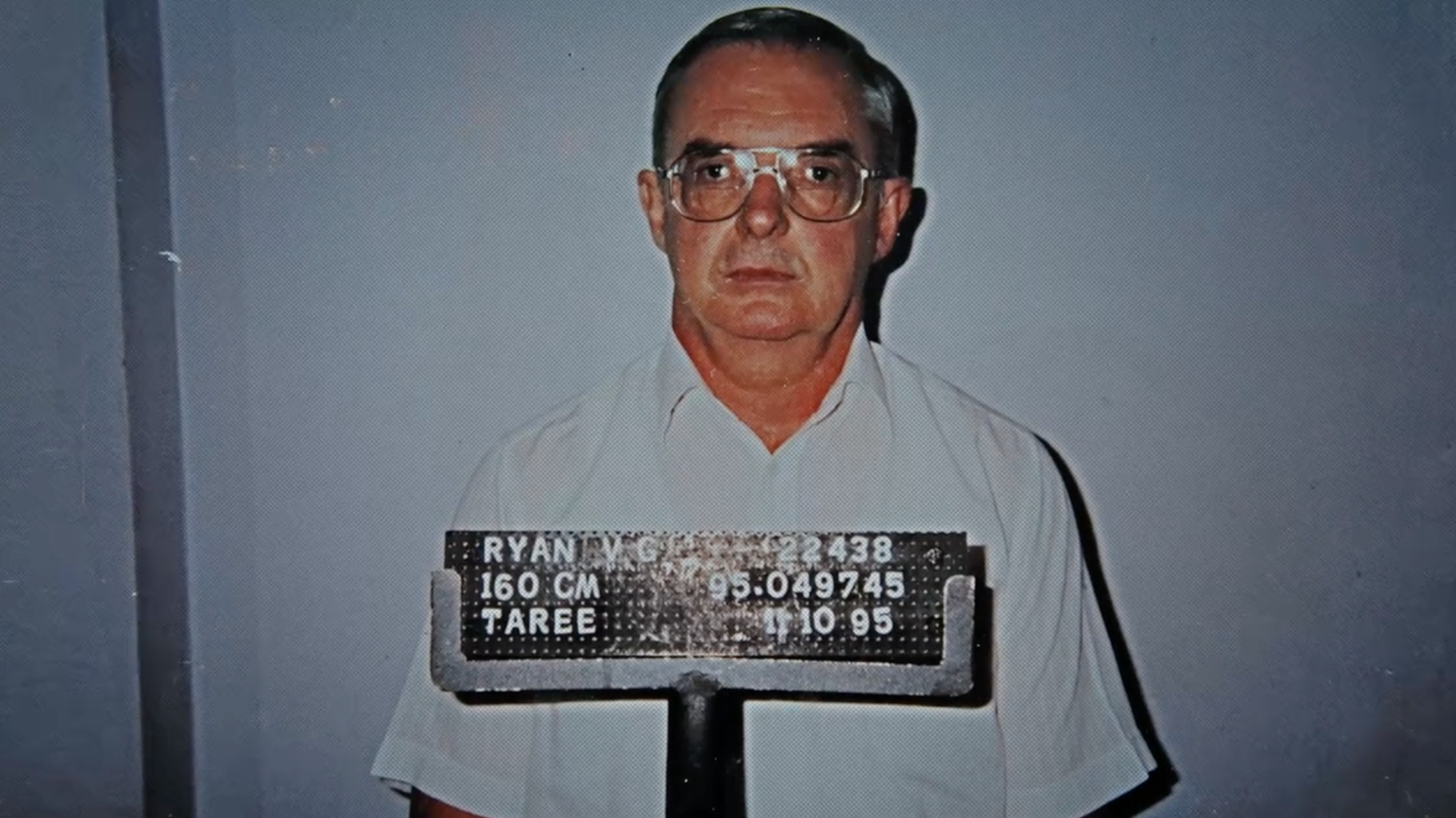
Ryan in 1995

== Merewether allegations ==
In 1975, Sister Margaret Anne Geatches, a member of the Sisters of St Joseph's of Lochinvar, was principal of St Joseph's Primary School, Merewether.

During a school sports carnival, there was a confrontation between Ryan and a pupil, Gerard McDonald, who called Ryan "a poofter" (slang for a homosexual). Geatches heard the commotion and discovered Phylis McDonald (Gerard's mother), another parent and a group of Year 5 boys at the top of the stairs. Geatches spoke with the boys who told her they had been "touched" by Ryan. Geatches assured the group that she would report Ryan and ensure it did not happen again.

Scott Hallett and Gerard McDonald disclosed to their teacher, Chris Hallinan, that Ryan had sexually assaulted them during altar boy practice. McDonald said Ryan's abuse occurred every week for nearly the entire year As Hallinan listened to the boys' complaints, Geatches arrived and asked him to stop talking to the boys. Hallinan told the Royal Commission that he believed complaints against Ryan would be dealt with by the church, that he should take no further action and if he did not cease his involvement there could be a risk to his future employment. Geatches reported the allegations to Sister Evelyn Woodward, another member of her religious community and a counsellor. Woodward agreed to speak to Monsignor Patrick Cotter.

Phylis McDonald told police that her son Gerard told her Ryan had been touching him "down there". Later that day the father of another boy said he was going to report the allegations to Monsignor Cotter. On the same night, Sister Woodward reported the allegations to Cotter, which she said was "oral and anal penetration, penis sucking and attempts at masturbation". Cotter asked Woodward what he should do and Woodward told him to remove Ryan from access to children immediately, suggested he send Ryan to Peter Evans, a psychiatrist with the Order of Franciscan Friars in Melbourne. On 16 December 1975, Cotter wrote to Evans, explaining there had been a serious incident "involving altar boys and more than one".

Following the multiple reports, Cotter confronted Ryan who admitted he had sexually abused the children. Woodward received a phone-call from Cotter shortly after she had reported the allegation to him. He told her that Ryan had "knelt at his feet, wept and admitted what he had done". Sister Geatches did not report what she knew about Ryan to her successor, Sister Ursula Kauter. Geatches told the Royal Commission she thought paedophilia could be cured with treatment and regretted not taking further action. In 1976, Kauter was approached by Phylis McDonald who told the nun that her son and other boys had been sexually abused by Ryan.

Despite his admissions, Monsignor Cotter sent Ryan to the remote Wollombi parish. In late January 1976, Ryan travelled to "La Verna" Franciscan retreat house in Kew, Melbourne. Ryan's parishioners were told he was on a "pastoral" 'study course. Peter Evans met Ryan once, where Ryan admitted his sexual attraction to young boys. Cotter made no inquiries with Evans regarding Ryan and sought no recommendation or assurance that Ryan was cured or fit to return to ministry. Evans was not aware the diocese was waiting and relying on his advice on Ryan's future career.

In an interview for the ABC television series Revelation, Evans said that "The only reason Ryan was sent to me at La Verna was because the church wanted to cover up a crime." Ryan undertook a postgraduate course at the National Pastoral Institute in Elsternwick.

== Return to Newcastle and Hunter region ==
In June 1976, Bishop Toohey died and was replaced by Bishop Leo Clarke. On 14 November 1976, Ryan wrote to Clarke saying he would return to Maitland in December. Clarke replied, appointing Ryan assistant priest of Newcastle and asking him to begin 18 December. Both Cotter and Clarke assumed, wrongly, that Ryan was cured. As such, Ryan was not subject to any restrictions preventing him from interacting with children.

In 1977, Gerald McDonald observed Ryan officiating a service at the Marist Brothers School in Hamilton and told his mother, who rang the school to complain. Ryan's reappearance caused considerable distress to the students who had been sexually abused. Ryan continued to sexually abuse children after he returned from Melbourne and has been convicted of offences regarding the sexual abuse of children in Hamilton, East Gresford and Cessnock.

On 8 July 1978, Ryan was appointed assistant priest to Monsignor Cotter in Hamilton. One of Ryan's victims told the Royal Commission that he was abused by Ryan when he was 7 or 8 years old. He said the abuse started one day after school, when Ryan plied him with soft drinks and invited him into his bedroom. Ryan invited the boy to get undressed and proceeded to masturbate in front of the boy. Ryan also showed him pornographic videos and performed sexual acts on him. He said the abuse continued until he was 13 or 14 years old. In 1997, Ryan was convicted of multiple counts of indecent assault and sexual assault in relation to this man.

On 14 January 1984, Ryan was appointed parish priest at East Gresford. CNE told the royal commission that Ryan sexually abused him when he served as an altar boy on weekends. He described one instance when a parishioner walked into the sacristy and saw Ryan abusing him but walked out without saying a word. When CNE was later convicted of sexually assaulting a child, he was sent to the same prison as Ryan. Ryan pleaded guilty to charges against CNE in 2016.

On 9 April 1988, Ryan was appointed parish priest at Cessnock. He lived at the presbytery with Father David O'Hearn, who would also later be convicted of child sexual abuse. CNG provided a statement to the royal commission saying that he was sexually abused by Ryan in the late 1980s. Ryan was convicted of five counts of sexual intercourse with a boy, CNF. CNF's mother told police that Ryan had befriended her and became a father figure to her children. She said CNF spent time alone with Ryan, including staying overnight at the presbytery at weekends and on holidays. This contact continued even after Ryan was transferred from Cessnock.

CNH provided a police statement in January 1997 and told police that her husband disclosed that Ryan used to "interfere" with boys in Merewether. CNH telephoned Ryan and said to him that she knew what he did to little boys. Ryan responded by saying "... yes, but I've stopped I've had help I went to Melbourne it's alright now ... all I can say is I'm sorry." After the admission from Ryan, CNH called the bishop's office and was being put through to Monsignor Cotter. She asked Cotter if he was aware that Ryan was molesting boys and his response was "... yes, we are aware he has been sent to Melbourne to get psychiatric help ... we'll deal with it." CNH then phoned the police and said she believed that Ryan was molesting boys. In an unsigned statement by Bishop Clarke in 1997, he referred to an anonymous complaint consistent with CNH's police statement. Clarke admitted he had received another allegation that Ryan had sexually abused CNH's husband when he was a child. Clarke did nothing.

== Criminal investigations and initial sentencing ==
In 1995, Gerard McDonald and Scott Hallett reported their abuse to police. They approached several solicitors but could not find anyone willing to help. Sister Woodward received a call from McDonald's mother, alleging Ryan had sexually abused a group of altar-boys and that her son was planning to report this to police. Woodward did not report the call to Bishop Clarke until September 1995.

On 7 August 1995, McDonald and Hallett were interviewed by Senior Constable Troy Grant. The men provided Grant with detailed maps of St Joseph's sacristy and described how Ryan had masturbated, performed oral sex and attempted to anally rape Gerard McDonald. Hallett said Ryan told them "... don't tell anyone, this is our little secret".

Cotter met with Ryan on 10 October 1995 and informed him there was "some sort of talk" about allegations that Ryan had sexually assaulted someone. He provided Ryan with the telephone number of Father Brian Lucas. Woodward was notified by Lucas, a member of the National Professional Standards Committee, that Ryan was about to be arrested.

On 11 October 1995, Senior Constable Troy Grant travelled to Taree, entered the presbytery and introduced himself to Ryan. Grant provided a brief outline of the allegations and informed Ryan he was under arrest. Ryan accompanied Grant to Taree Police Station where Ryan requested contact be made with Father Lucas at St Mary's Cathedral, Sydney, and produced a piece of paper with Lucas's details written on it. Ryan said that he wanted to speak to Lucas because "he deals with this type of case for Australian bishops".

Ryan told Grant he had been tipped-off by Cotter that he was about to be arrested.

Father Lucas advised Ryan he should seek independent legal advice. At 1.15 pm, Senior Constable Grant and Senior Constable David Anson (Child Protection Investigation Team) commenced interviewing Ryan, during which Ryan confirmed he had admitted to Cotter he had sexually abused children. Following the interview, Ryan was charged with a number of offences, conditionally bailed and released. Grant then executed a search warrant at the presbytery and seized a number of folders. On 30 October 1995, police executed a search warrant on Ryan's house and seized a number of items which corroborated the complaints of a victim. Ryan admitted destroying pornographic material.

On 30 October 1995, Bishop Leo Clarke informed Bishop Michael Malone that Ryan had been arrested and directed Malone to take responsibility for handling the church's response. Three months after Ryan's arrest, Clarke announced his resignation. Malone said the handover lasted a few minutes and when Malone asked Clarke if there was anything he needed to know. Clarke responded "... oh, no, you will find out." Newcastle Herald journalist Jeff Corbett reported that Bishop Clarke had been ordered by the Vatican to retire when they learned of the police investigation. As Ryan was charged, the newly installed Bishop Malone was ending the ministry of another abusive priest in his diocese, Father Denis McAlinden. Malone wrote to McAlinden: "I regret that one of my first duties as Bishop is to continue Canonical procedures against you."

On 13 November 1995, Bishop Malone wrote to priests of the diocese, requesting they read a pastoral statement regarding Ryan's sexual abuse charges. The statement confirmed Ryan had been charged and withdrawn from ministry. Malone told the royal commission that he had no prior knowledge of a police investigation into Ryan. On 24 January 1996, Grant interviewed Monsignor Cotter about what he knew of Ryan's sexual abuse of children. Cotter refused to answers questions relating to his decision to send Ryan to Melbourne and did not recall writing to Evans about Ryan or having any conversations with Ryan. Cotter also did not recall warning Ryan of his imminent arrest. Cotter agreed that sexual assaults on children was a serious matter and that he was aware of "rumours" about Ryan. On 23 April 1996, Bishop Malone issued a press release stating charges of sexual abuse had been laid against Ryan and the diocese offered free, independent and confidential counselling to anyone who had experienced abuse from priests or anyone working as agents of the diocese. Malone did not speak to Woodward or Cotter and Clarke had not revealed a great deal.

On 23 May 1996, Ryan pleaded guilty to six charges of indecently assaulting a male person and five charges of homosexual intercourse with a male person between the age of 10 and 18 years and was sentenced to 6 years' imprisonment. The Director of Public Prosecutions considered the sentence inadequate and appealed. In late August, the Court of Criminal Appeal of New South Wales dismissed the appeal. In an article published by The Newcastle Herald on 31 May 1996, Bishop Malone was quoted as saying the diocese had "acted with integrity". A few days later he clarified the point, saying that "in retrospect, with the knowledge we have now, no, we didn't act with integrity" and "There was I think, in the mind of the Church then a sense where it's best to cover-up the scandal and risk of scandal, rather than just publicise everything." he Royal Commission found that Malone made a number of public statements that misrepresented the true position in relation to the adequacy of the diocese's response.

On 27 August 1996, Senior Constable Troy Grant took Ryan from the Cooma Correctional Centre and interviewed him at Cooma Police Station in the presence of his solicitor. During this interview Ryan made further admissions to sexual assaults upon 18 more children at Hamilton, East Gresford, Cessnock, Maitland and Merewether. Ryan was charged and bail formally refused. Following Ryan's admission, Grant obtained statements from eight victims, the wife of one and the mother of another two children. Ryan was charged with a further 38 charges of sexual abuse, bringing the number of charges to 44. In June, Ryan was charged with another 9 offences, bringing the final number of charges to 53.

On 24 September 1997, Ryan appeared at the District Court of New South Wales and pleaded guilty to all charges. Two days later he was sentenced. In his sentencing remarks, Judge Neild said that "there could be no greater breach of trust that for a priest to sexually abuse children of his congregation." Neild alluded to the scale of Ryan's offending, saying that because there were so many instances of sexual abuse committed by Ryan, a precise number cannot be determined. He sentenced Ryan to 16 1/2 years, with a minimum term of 13 years, 1 month and 2 weeks.

== Miscellaneous ==
On 14 June 1996, Paul Reynolds, claims manager for the diocese's insurer, Catholic Church Insurance (CCI), wrote a memo about the indemnity position in relation to claims against Ryan. Reynolds was concerned that Monsignor Cotter was notified of Ryan's offending in 1975. On 29 December 1999, solicitors for CCI notified the diocese's solicitors that the request for indemnity was denied. They wrote "at best the activities of various agents of the Diocese in that period can be described as reckless indifference. At worst, as you are aware, the police considered charging Monsignor Cotter with criminal offences relating to his failure to deal with this matter appropriately." In February 2000, the diocese and CCI signed a heads of agreement to resolve the indemnity claim. CCI contributed $2 million to the diocese for claims against Ryan.

In November 2010, Ryan signed a confidential memorandum of understanding (MOU) with the Diocese of Maitland-Newcastle. The MOU clearly stated that Ryan posed an unacceptable risk as he has been convicted of an offence involving repeated sexual assault of a number of children and was on the Sex Offender Register. Ryan expressed a desire to remain a member of the diocese and Bishop Malone agreed, under conditions outlined in the MOU. The diocese would pay for Ryan's accommodation and any costs associated with medical or clinical treatment and medical benefits. Ryan's movements would be closely monitored and certain school zones or parks to be exclusion zones. It was decided Ryan would not return to Newcastle or the Hunter Valley to live.

In August 2009, Bishop Malone appealed to Pope Benedict XVI for early retirement after struggling to cope with the child sex abuse scandals in his Diocese. In April 2011, Malone's resignation was approved. Malone cited exhaustion dealing with the child abuse scandals as the main reason he stood down. He told The Newcastle Herald "I'm emotionally drained by what has happened and feel disillusioned." In 2013, Malone told the Cunneen Special Commission of Inquiry in Newcastle that he never looked at confidential files about priests despite the fact many had been charged and convicted of sexual abuse of children. Malone agreed his evidence "defied belief" considering some of the documents had been obtained from filing cabinets in Malone's private office. Malone said the only "secret" documents Bishop Clarke had alerted him to were held in a "rather large briefcase in the corner of his office". In 2014, Malone told the Royal Commission that in 1995, Bishop Clarke told him Ryan had offended many times and admitted there had been a cover-up by his predecessors.

== Release and later sentencing ==
Ryan (then aged 73) was released from Long Bay Correctional Centre on parole on 6 August 2010, having served 14 years and 9 months imprisonment. Bishop Malone told The Newcastle Herald that the Catholic Church did not intend to laicise Ryan and the decision was based on the church's role in supervising him. Malone confirmed Ryan would not return to the Maitland-Newcastle diocese but the church would provide suitable accommodation for him in Sydney. Malone said Ryan had a right to "a future with dignity and safety" and urged parishioners to pray for Ryan upon his release.

Ryan (then aged 78) appeared in the District Court of New South Wales on 27 April 2016, charged with multiple sexual offences against one boy in East Gresford. On the eve of trial Ryan pleaded guilty to three charges, including attempting sexual intercourse with the boy. On 14 October 2016, Ryan was given a 15-month suspended sentence.

In March 2019, Ryan (then aged 81) faced more sex abuse charges. His trial was held over four weeks in the NSW District Court. For the first time in Australia, the Chief Judge of the District Court, the Honourable Justice Derek Price, allowed journalists Sarah Ferguson and Nial Fulton to bring cameras into court for their documentary series Revelation. Judge Dina Yehia, the Crown prosecutor, the defence and Ryan consented to filming and the trial featured in Episodes 1 and 2 of the series.

On 22 May 2019, Ryan was sentenced to 3 years and 3 months, with a non-parole period of 14 months for indecently assaulting two altar boys in the 1970s and 1990s. On 21 July 2020, Ryan was released from prison on parole and despite multiple convictions, the Diocese of Maitland-Newcastle confirmed that Ryan was still a Catholic priest.

Ryan died on 13 April 2022. The Diocese of Maitland–Newcastle concealed news of his death for a six-week period, triggering anger from his surviving victims.

== See also ==
- Catholic Church sexual abuse cases in Australia
