= Patrick Vincent Dwyer =

- Bishop of Maitland
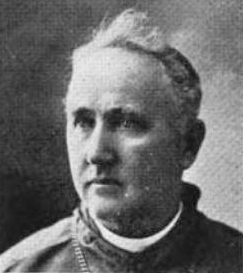
- Patrick Vincent Dwyer in 1917
- Church: Catholic Church
- Diocese: Diocese of Maitland
- In office: 9 June 1909 – 28 March 1931
- Predecessor: James Murray
- Successor: Edmund Gleeson
- Previous posts: Titular Bishop of Zoara (1897-1909); Coadjutor Bishop of Maitland (1897-1909)

Orders
- Ordination: 4 March 1882 by Giulio Lenti
- Consecration: 6 June 1897 by Francis Moran

Personal details
- Born: 21 August 1858 Albury, Colony of New South Wales, British Empire
- Died: 28 March 1931 (aged 72) West Maitland, New South Wales, Commonwealth of Australia, British Empire
- Education: St Stanislaus' College; Clonliffe College

Patrick Vincent Dwyer (21 August 1858 – 28 March 1931) was the first Australian born Roman Catholic Bishop.

== Life ==
Patrick Vincent Dwyer was born on 21 August 1858 at Albury, New South Wales, to William Dwyer, schoolteacher, and his wife, Anastasia, née Dermody, both his parents being from Kilkenny, Ireland. He was educated at St Stanislaus' College in Bathurst, and on encouragement from Bishop James Murray he went to study for the priesthood in Clonliffe College Dublin in Ireland and the Pontifical Urban University of Propaganda Fide in Rome, being ordained on 4 March 1882 after which he returned to Australia.

Father Dwyer served as secretary to Bishop Murray, Bishop of Maitland; and from 1882 to 1889 as diocesan inspector of schools. In 1897, he was appointed coadjutor to Bishop Murray his mentor (the first Australian-born Catholic bishop) and then Bishop in 1909 of Maitland, New South Wales, upon Murray's death. Bishop Dwyer wrote the "Diocese of Maitland" article for the Catholic Encyclopedia.

His brother Joseph Wilfrid Dwyer DD (1869-1939) also studied in Dublin and Rome and became a priest and served as a Bishop of Wagga.

His nephew Francis Aloysius Dwyer (1902-1953) was a Supreme Court judge of New South Wales.

Bishop Patrick Dwyer died of coronary vascular disease in West Maitland on 28 March 1931 and was buried in the Sacred Heart Church.
