= St Francis Xavier's Cathedral, Wollongong =

Roman Catholic cathedral in Wollongong, Australia

St Francis Xavier's Cathedral
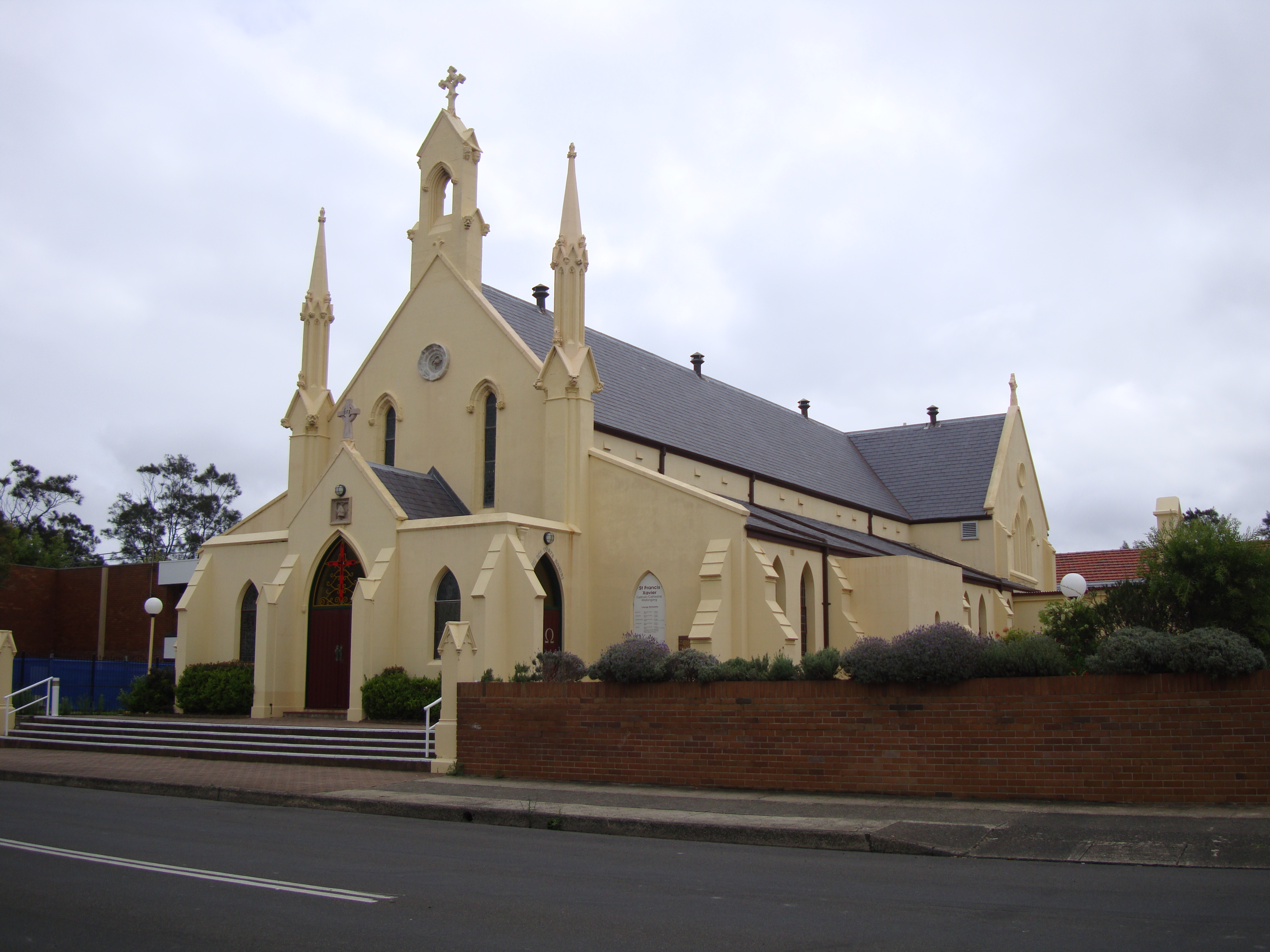

- Location within New South Wales Location within Australia

Religion
- Affiliation: Roman Catholic
- Diocese: Diocese of Wollongong
- Ecclesiastical or organizational status: Cathedral
- Leadership: Bishop Brian Mascord
- Year consecrated: 2010

Location
- Location: Wollongong, Australia
- Interactive map of St Francis Xavier's Cathedral
- Coordinates: 34°25′32″S 150°54′7″E

Architecture
- Style: Gothic
- Groundbreaking: 1841
- Completed: 1848
- Capacity: 500

Website
- St Francis Xavier's Cathedral website

Saint Francis Xavier Cathedral, located in Wollongong, New South Wales, Australia, is the seat of the Roman Catholic Bishop of the Diocese of Wollongong, presently the Most Reverend Brian Mascord.

The cathedral is the oldest church of any denomination in the Illawarra region.

== History ==
In 1836 a wooden chapel with seating for 250 people was built for the Catholics of Wollongong. The first Catholic school was opened in 1838. The pioneer priest Father John Rigney decided to build a larger permanent church in 1839.

The church of St Francis Xavier is a stone building in the Gothic style, richly ornamented and large enough to contain 500 people. Its estimated cost was 2,000 Pounds.

The building was furnished in 1848 with a splendid Gothic interior. The interior has been greatly altered over the years and apart from the beautiful stained glass window behind the sanctuary and the ceiling over the nave, little exists of the original interior.

In 1986 it was listed on the New South Wales State Heritage Register.

== Renovations ==
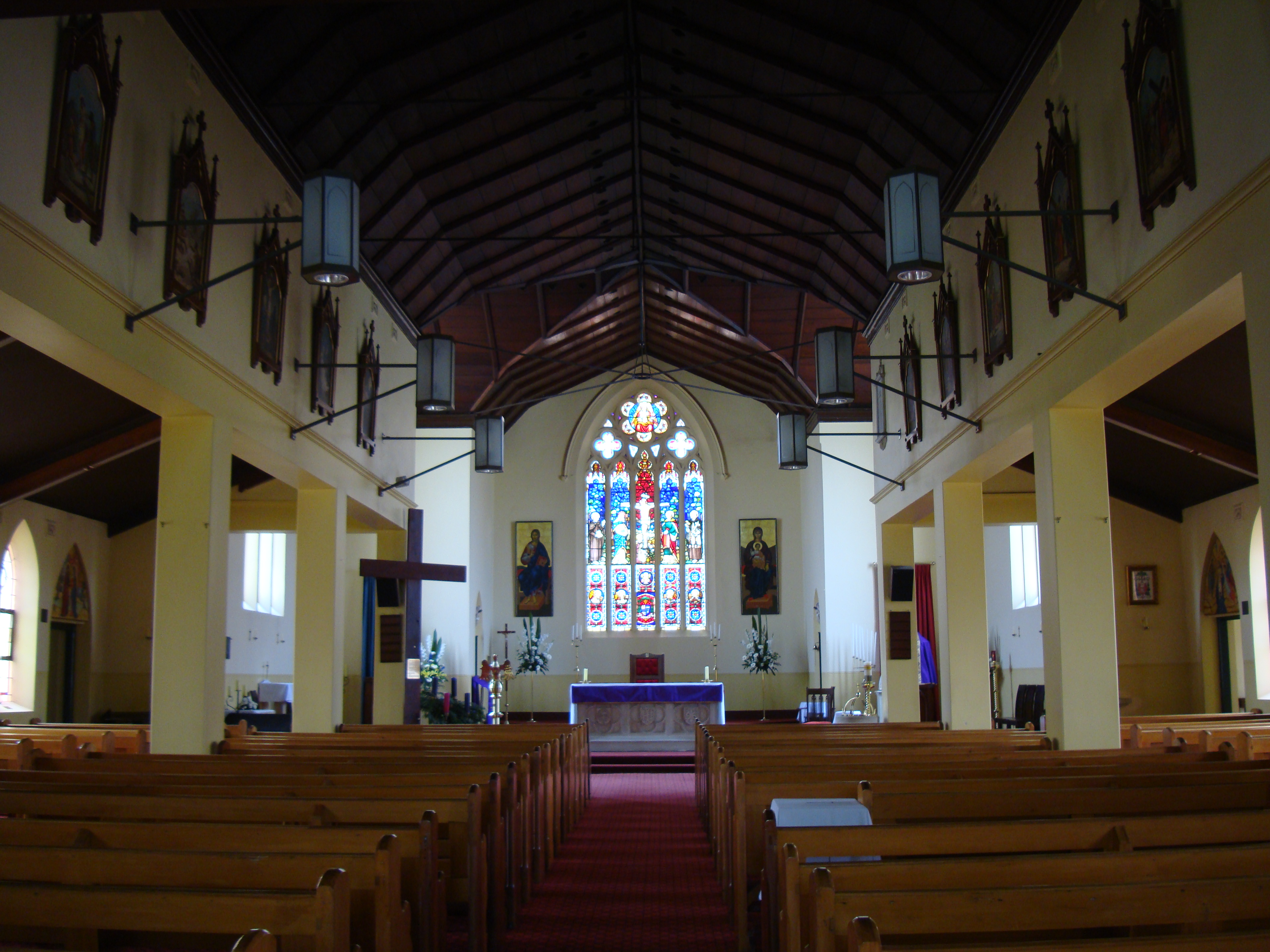
cathedral interior

The first addition was opened on 6 May 1906. The nave was lengthened by 7.6m, the original shingle roof was replaced by slate. Two galleries, one on each side of the sanctuary were added. In 1933, much damage was done to the interior with the church being widened. In 1951, St Francis Xavier's church was designated as the cathedral for the new Diocese of Wollongong. Alterations were made in 1960, the 1970s and in 1985. A Marian chapel was created from an old confessional. Some of the aesthetic damage done to the church with the widening of the interior was softened with the cladding of the square concrete columns; arches were added between these columns to unify the space. The Stations of the Cross were reorganised, carpet laid and the interior painted in tones selected to highlight the stained glass window.

== 2010 rededication ==
In April 2009, the latest program of restoration was initiated with the replacement of the roof of the cathedral with slate imported from Wales.

On 16 March 2010, the dedication of the renovated cathedral took place as it coincided with the anniversary of the death of Archbishop John Bede Polding, the first bishop in Australia. It was Bishop Polding who commissioned Saint Francis Xavier's Church. Bishop Peter Ingham performed the dedication.

== See also ==
- List of Roman Catholic cathedrals in Australia
