= St Michael's Catholic Church, Nowra =

St Michael's Catholic Church
- St Michael's Catholic Church
- 34°52′20″S 150°35′52″E
- Address: 30 North Street, Nowra, New South Wales
- Country: Australia
- Denomination: Roman Catholic
- Website: nowraparish.au

History
- Status: Church
- Founded: November 1875
- Founder: Archbishop Roger Vaughan
- Dedication: Saint Michael
- Consecrated: 30 September 1877

Architecture
- Functional status: Active
- Architectural type: Church
- Style: Gothic Revival
- Construction cost: A£1,200

Specifications
- Materials: Stone; tiles

Administration
- Diocese: Wollongong
- Parish: St Michael's Parish, Nowra

Clergy
- Priest: Fr Joseph Pothenparampil
- Pastor: Monsignor Patrick Faherty (Emeritus)

St Michael's Catholic Church is a Roman Catholic church located in 30 North Street, Nowra, New South Wales, Australia. Part of the Diocese of Wollongong, the Gothic Revival church is home to St Michael's Parish, Nowra.

St Michael's Parish takes in the northern Shoalhaven City region andincorporates the Church Communities of St Michael's, Nowra; St Patrick's, Berry, Sacred Heart, Bomaderry; Mary, Help of Christians, Culburra; St Joseph's, Kangaroo Valley; and Holy Spirit, Vincentia.

== Building ==
In November 1875 Archbishop Roger Vaughan laid the foundation stone of St. Michael's Church Nowra. He later blessed and opened it on 30 September 1877. It cost A£1,200.

The church is built of squared rubble stonework in courses and originally had a shingle roof. The stonework is generally in good condition and despite several additions over the years, the southern and western elevations still indicate the original character of the building.

The style of the church is known as Early English Gothic (1189 – 1307) also known as Lancet which is most marked by the simplicity of its ornament. Early English Gothic elements can be seen in the stained glass window to the western wall, the tall narrow window openings, projecting buttresses, articulated quoins and steep pitched root. The stonework to the western stained glass window when viewed from the outside has architectural origins dating back to 1170.

In 1921 additional accommodation was constructed on the eastern end. The original church extended to the present choir loft. The addition was sympathetic to the original church, however the shingle roof was re¬placed with tiles. Additional stained glass windows were added at this time. Further additions were carried out in 1958 including the side entrance and sacristy.

On 6 November 1921, the blessing and opening of the extensions took place. six point one metres (twenty feet) were added to the length of the church, the gallery was constructed and the shingles on the roof were replaced by tiles. The extensions were in harmony with the fabric of the church and had cost A£1,660. Later that day, there was the blessing of the foundation stone of the new convent at Berry. The new church at Berry was opened in 1936.

== Parish history ==
According to the Australian Catholic Directory the district of the Shoalhaven (now the Parish of Nowra) was established in 1863. In 2013 the parish celebrated its Sesquicentenary.

When the Illawarra Mission was established in 1838, Fr John Rigney made monthly visits to the Shoalhaven, to celebrate Mass and the sacraments. In the 1840s a wooden building was constructed in Nowra to serve as a Mass chapel and as the first school. The 1841 Catholic Directory noted that there were an estimated 150 Catholics in the Shoalhaven district and that an average of 80 attended the monthly Mass.

The parish of Shoalhaven-Ulladulla was established in 1863 with Fr David D’Arcy as the first resident priest. In 1865 the Mass centre at Nowra was rebuilt and it was to remain the Mass centre for Nowra for another twelve years. It was first thought that Numbaa would be the centre for the Shoalhaven parish; but the Shoalhaven River floods of the 1860s and 1870s caused the main settlement to move to Nowra. Because of that, the building of the church at Numbaa, for which a foundation stone had been laid in 1869, did not proceed. The original presbytery at Numbaa, given to the Church by David Berry, still stands.

Other centres also constructed their own church buildings. The original Kangaroo Valley church, with accommodation for only 30, was built in 1874. In 1877, land was purchased at Berry, and 21 March 1884 saw the opening of the new church there. The first Nowra presbytery was to cost A£295. It was later to serve as the first convent from 1893 to 1905.

According to the Catholic Year Book of 1882 the churches in the Shoalhaven parish were: St Michael's, Nowra; St Patrick's, Broughton Creek; St Mary's, Ulladulla and St Joseph's, Kangaroo Valley. There were also Mass stations at Greenwell Point, Coolangatta, Milton and Woodburn. Weekday Mass was in the church and sometimes in the presbytery (which was still at Numbaa). The Catholic population was estimated to be about 1,200.

On 8 October 1887, the present presbytery was opened, having cost A£900. In 1888 the Sisters of St Joseph arrived in Berry and opened their school for 48 children. The same year saw the opening of the present St Joseph's Church, Kangaroo Valley, at a cost of A£849.

The next parish priest, Monsignor John Purcell arrived in December 1956. He immediately embarked on an extensive programme of school building, then church extensions and renovations. In 1959, the building of Sacred Heart Church, Bomaderry; in 1963, further renovations to St Michael's in 1969; the building of Our Lady, Help of Christians' Church, Culburra in 1978; Holy Spirit Church, Vincentia, in 1983 and the re-establishment of a Catholic High School in Nowra, with St John the Evangelist High School. With over 9,000 Catholics, six churches, three other Mass centres and over 600 children in St Michael's School, much has been achieved in this parish in 150 years. The Sisters of St Joseph left Berry in 1978, and St Patrick's School closed the following year. Fr. Patrick J. Faherty took up the office in 1993.

The parish also contains two schools: St Michael's Primary School and St John the Evangelist High School.
