= James Murray (bishop of Maitland) =

The Most Reverend James Murray D.D.
- Bishop of Diocese of Maitland
- Diocese: Maitland
- Installed: 14 November 1865
- Term ended: 9 July 1909
- Predecessor: Charles Henry Davis
- Successor: Patrick Vincent Dwyer

Orders
- Ordination: 28 March 1852 at Rome
- Consecration: 14 November 1865 at St Mary's Pro-Cathedral, Dublin by Paul Cullen

Personal details
- Born: James Murray; 25 March 1828 Wicklow, County Wicklow, Ireland
- Died: 9 July 1909 (aged 81) Maitland, New South Wales, Australia
- Buried: Maitland, New South Wales, Australia
- Denomination: Catholic Church
- Occupation: Catholic bishop
- Education: Pontificio Collegio Urbano de Propaganda Fide; Pontifical Urban University
- Motto: Deum Time (Fear God)

James Murray (25 March 1828 – 9 July 1909) was a Roman Catholic bishop, the first resident bishop of the diocese of Maitland in New South Wales, Australia.

== Early life ==
Murray was born in County Wicklow, Ireland, the son of James Murray, a farmer, and his wife Catherine, née Doyle. He was the grand nephew of Daniel Murray, Archbishop of Dublin and Primate of Ireland.

At 16, his great-uncle sent him to Rome to live at the Pontificio Collegio Urbano de Propaganda Fide at Rome and study at Pontifical Urban University. He became a protégé of Archbishop Paul Cullen, who was rector of the Pontifical Irish College at the time. In 1851, he was awarded a doctorate for theses on the authority of the Roman Pontiffs.

== Priesthood ==
Murray was ordained a priest for the Archdiocese of Dublin on 28 March 1852 and returned to Ireland. After briefly working in the parishes, he was appointed Archbishop Cullen's private secretary in 1854, who had recently been appointed Archbishop of Dublin.

During his 11 years in the role, he helped Cullen bring the Irish church into line with Roman canon law and usage. Cullen also became the moulder of the early Australian hierarchy, assisted by Murray. The twelve Irish priests appointed to Australian sees between 1846 and 1878 were all in some way Cullen's men. He was related to three of them, he formed most of them in their student days in Rome, and he was their friend and confidant either in Rome or in Dublin.

== Episcopate ==
On 14 November 1865 in Dublin, Murray was appointed and consecrated first Bishop of Maitland, (when his cousin Matthew Quinn was also consecrated Bishop of Bathurst) by Cardinal Cullen. In October 1866 he landed in New South Wales, accompanied by nine priests and 16 nuns for the Diocese.

Murray was formally installed in the Diocese on 1 November 1866, taking possession of St John's Cathedral, Maitland. After taking possession of the see, the ecclesiastical and educational development of the diocese under his auspices were enormous. At the time of taking possession of the Diocese, it extended to include the dioceses of Armidale and Lismore.

One of his first priorities after taking possession of the Diocese was to celebrate the Sacrament of Confirmation on the young people. He confirmed 350 candidates in one month. In 1871, he returned to Ireland in a bid to find missionaries and nuns to carry out the religious and educational work in the Diocese.

In 1881, following a visit to Rome, he brought four Redemptorists with him to establish a presence in the vast Diocese.

He visited Rome several times during his episcopate for ad limina visits, in 1871, 1881 and 1889.

Upon inheriting the Diocese, there were 20 churches and 14 schools within its boundaries, and only one religious community. During his time, he erected 50 more churches and increased the number of schools to 43. The Diocese also had 22 religious communities from a number of different orders which had been introduced to the Diocese by Murray. This included the Redemptorists, Marist Brothers, Dominican Nuns, Sisters of Mercy, and Sisters of St Joseph.

Murray's health began to worsen by the mid-1890s and in 1897 he chose Patrick Vincent Dwyer, his protégé, as coadjutor bishop.

== Death ==
In January 1909, Murray would make his last public appearance, celebrating the funeral for a Dominican sister. By May, he was deteriorating and was in a "very low" and "hopeless" state, gradually weakening. He died on 9 July 1909 at the age of 81 following a long illness.
