= Diocese of Wollongong =

Latin Catholic territory in Australia

Diocese of Wollongong Dioecesis Vollongongensis

Location
- Country: Australia
- Territory: Illawarra and Southern Highlands regions of New South Wales
- Ecclesiastical province: Sydney
- Coordinates: 34°25′22″S 150°53′32″E

Statistics
- Area: 6,121 km^{2} (2,363 sq mi)
- Population: Total; Catholics: (as of 2004); ▲647,912; ▲195,669 ( 30.2%)
- Parishes: ▼28

Information
- Denomination: Catholic Church
- Sui iuris church: Latin Church
- Rite: Roman Rite
- Established: 15 November 1951; 74 years ago
- Cathedral: St Francis Xavier's Cathedral, Wollongong
- Patron saint: Immaculate Heart of Mary

Current leadership
- Pope: Leo XIV
- Bishop: Brian Mascord
- Metropolitan Archbishop: Anthony Fisher OP

Map

Website
- Catholic Diocese of Wollongong

The Diocese of Wollongong is a Latin Church ecclesiastical jurisdiction or diocese of the Catholic Church in Australia. Established in 1951, the diocese covers the Illawarra and Southern Highlands regions of New South Wales. It is a suffragan in the ecclesiastical province of the metropolitan Archdiocese of Sydney

St Francis Xavier's Cathedral, Wollongong is the cathedra of the Bishop of Wollongong, currently Brian Mascord.

== History ==
On 15 November 1951, Pope Pius XII announced that a new diocese would be created from the two archdioceses of Sydney and Canberra & Goulburn. To be named Wollongong, the diocese was officially established on 11 February 1952. Bishop Thomas McCabe was transferred from Port Pirie to become its first bishop and the historic Church of St Francis Xavier in Wollongong became the cathedral. At the time of establishment, there was a Catholic population of approximately 22,000 in 18 parishes.

While the Wollongong diocese is relatively recent, the churches of Campbelltown (1835), Appin (1837), Wollongong (1838), Picton (1847), Kiama (1852), Camden (1859), Shellharbour (1861), Nowra (1863), The Oaks (1865), Albion Park (1867), Bulli (1886), Berrima (1889) and Milton-Ulladulla (1890) trace their Catholic legacy back to the early times of European settlement and to the era of Archbishop John Bede Polding, Australia's first bishop.

Initially, the diocese was composed of parishes in the Illawarra, Shoalhaven and Southern Highland regions. In 1954 it was expanded to include Camden and Campbelltown and in 1975 the parishes of Batemans Bay, Moruya and Narooma reverted to the Archdiocese of Canberra & Goulburn. The boundaries of the diocese have since remained the same. The most recently established parish is Oran Park (founded on 22 June 2015), which meets the borders of the Archdiocese of Sydney and the Diocese of Parramatta. Created out of Camden Parish, Oran Park was founded to meet the needs of the rapidly expanding population in the region.

In 1959, Pope John XXIII dedicated the diocese to the Immaculate Heart of Mary.

== Bishops ==
=== Bishops of Wollongong ===
Bishops of Wollongong:

Bishops
Order	Name	Date enthroned	Reign ended	Term of office	Reason for term end
1	Thomas Absolem McCabe	15 November 1951	10 May 1974	22 years, 176 days	Resigned and appointed Bishop Emeritus of Wollongong
2	William Edward Murray	5 June 1975	12 April 1996	20 years, 312 days	Retired and appointed Bishop Emeritus of Wollongong
3	Philip Wilson	12 April 1996	30 November 2000	4 years, 232 days	Elevated to Archbishop of Adelaide
4	Peter Ingham	6 June 2001	30 November 2017	16 years, 177 days	Retired and appointed Bishop Emeritus of Wollongong
5	Brian Mascord	22 February 2018	present	8 years, 240 days	n/a

=== Another priest of this diocese who became bishop ===
- Peter Andrew Comensoli, appointed Auxiliary Bishop of Sydney in 2011

== Parishes ==
The diocese is divided into ten deaneries that administer individual parishes, dedicated to particular saints:

1. Illawarra deanery with regular liturgical services held in the parishes of Albion Park (St Paul), Fairy Meadow (St John Vianney Co-Cathedral), Gwynneville (St Brigid), Unanderra (Immaculate Conception), Warrawong (St Francis of Assisi), West Wollongong (St Therese), and Wollongong (St Francis Xavier)
2. Macarthur deanery with regular liturgical services held in the parishes of Camden (St Paul), Campbelltown (St John the Evangelist), Eagle Vale (Mary Immaculate), Ingleburn (Holy Family), Macquarie Fields (Mary, Mother of the Church), Picton (St Anthony), Rosemeadow (Our Lady Help of Christians), Ruse (St Thomas More), The Oaks (St Aloysius Parish), and Varroville (Our Lady of Mount Carmel)
3. South Coast deanery with regular liturgical services held in the parishes of Kangaroo Valley (St Joseph), Kiama (Ss Peter and Paul), Milton (St Mary Star of the Sea), Nowra (St Michael), and Vincentia (Holy Spirit)
4. Southern Highlands deanery with regular liturgical services held in the parishes of Bowral (St Thomas Aquinas), Mittagong (St Michael), Moss Vale (St Paul) and Penrose Park (Shrine of Our Lady of Mercy)

== Other information ==
The diocese is the eighth largest diocese in Australia in terms of Catholic population (out of 33 total) and the largest non-capital city diocese. The diocese now ministers to 195,000 Catholics in 31 parishes, with 15 migrant chaplaincies. There are 43 Catholic schools, various youth ministries and a range of aged care, disability and welfare services together with special faith movements in the local area.

== See also ==
- Cases of Catholic sexual abuse in the Diocese of Wollongong
