= Diocese of Maitland-Newcastle =

Latin Catholic diocese in Australia

Diocese of Maitland-Newcastle Dioecesis Maitlandensis-Novocastrensis
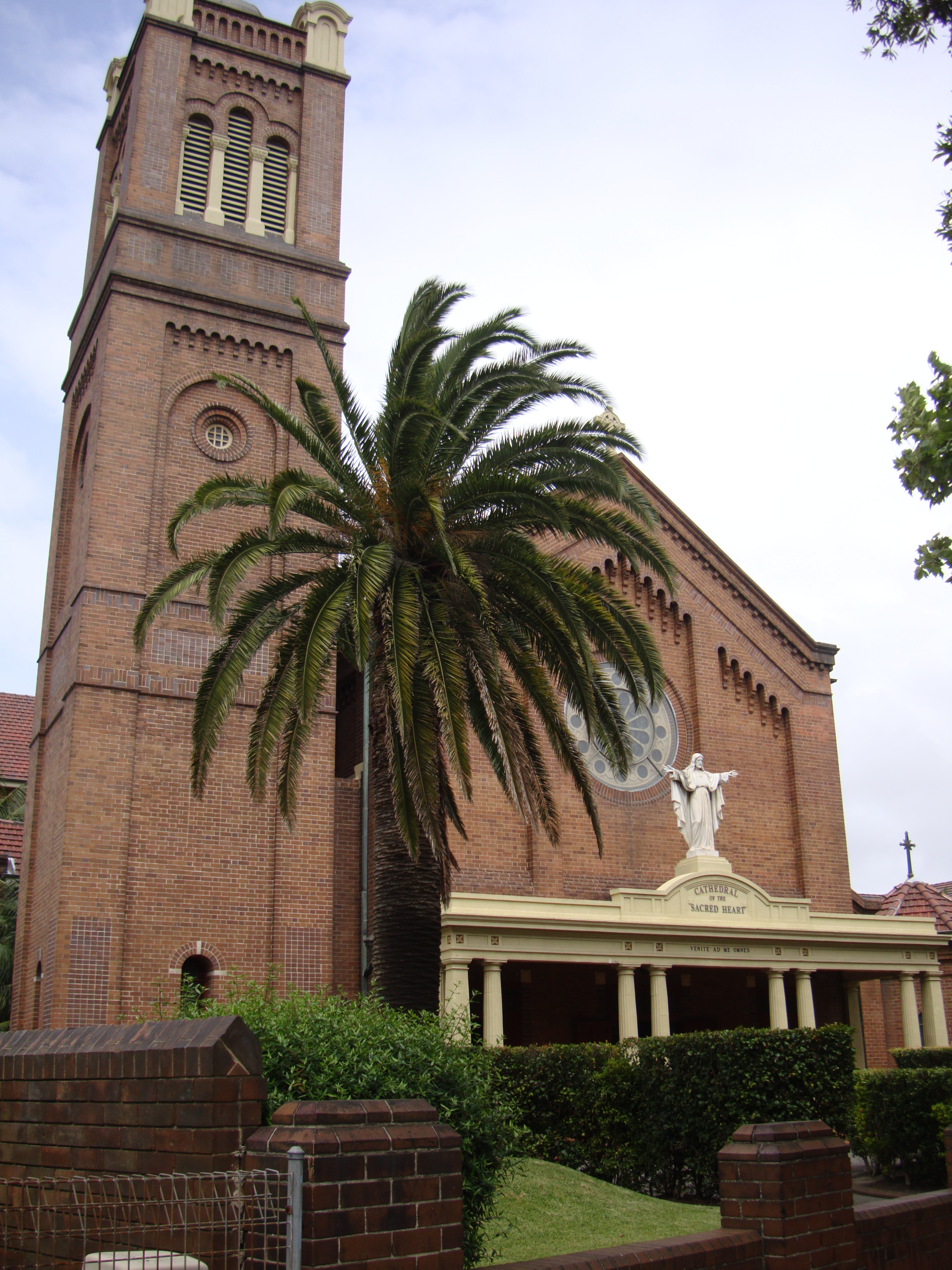
- Sacred Heart Cathedral

Location
- Country: Australia
- Territory: Hunter and Mid North Coast regions of New South Wales
- Metropolitan: Archdiocese of Sydney
- Coordinates: 32°55′24″S 151°45′15″E

Statistics
- Area: 33,757 km^{2} (13,034 sq mi)
- Population: Total; Catholics: (as of 2013); ▲666,292; ▲159,150 (23.9%)
- Parishes: 50
- Schools: 56 (2015)

Information
- Denomination: Catholic Church
- Sui iuris church: Latin Church
- Rite: Latin Church
- Established: 25 June 1847 as the Diocese of Maitland
- Cathedral: Sacred Heart Cathedral, Hamilton

Current leadership
- Pope: Leo XIV
- Bishop: Michael Kennedy
- Metropolitan Archbishop: Anthony Fisher OP

Map

Website
- mn.catholic.org.au

The Diocese of Maitland-Newcastle is a suffragan Latin Church diocese of the Archdiocese of Sydney, established in 1847 initially as the Diocese of Maitland and changed to the current name in 1995. The diocese covers the Hunter and Mid North Coast regions of New South Wales in Australia. The bishop of the diocese is Michael Kennedy.

The diocese is considered to be one of the epicentres of the Catholic sexual abuse scandal in Australia, with scores of priests and religious brothers convicted of crimes against children. Two senior members of the diocese, Father Thomas Brennan and Brother William Wade, have also been convicted of concealing child sexual abuse.

== History ==
Prior to the establishment of the diocese, the Hunter region was under the administration of the Sydney archdiocese. The Catholic Church defines a diocese as "a portion of the people of God, which is entrusted to a bishop" or as "a community of Christ's faithful in communion of faith and sacraments with their bishop" (see 1986 Code of Canon Law, Canon 369.) The three most notable priests assigned to the Hunter region, Therry, Dowling and Lynch, strived to build churches, schools and establish Catholic parishes. Monsignor Hartigan.

In these early years, travel to the Hunter was via the convict-built road from Windsor to Maitland via Wollombi, currently a world heritage listed item of heritage. The 1838 date coincided with the coronation of Queen Victoria and the Victorian era which included the age of steam driven locomotion. This new means of travel assisted the missionary expansion initiatives throughout New South Wales. Six Catholic parishes established were East Maitland 1835 (the first Catholic church built north of Sydney was the first St Joseph's Church in 1835), Newcastle 1838, West Maitland 1841, Singleton 1845, Taree 1846, Raymond Terrace 1852. In 1840 Thomas Haydon donated 2 1/2 acres for a church and cemetery at Murrurundi. In 1841 a foundation stone was laid for a wooden chapel and the cemetery consecrated. The chapel was completed in 1841 and replaced by the current sandstone building in 1860 which Archbishop Polding blessed and dedicated to St Joseph on 19 February 1860. The memorial plaque on the wall of the church and street the church is on is Polding Street overlooking the great northern railway. During 1840 and 1845, Archbishop Bede Polding visited the whole Hunter Valley and laid foundation stones for churches at Wollombi and St John's at Campbell's Hill. The foundation stone was moved to West Maitland where St John the Baptist Church opened in 1846.

On 16 April 1847, Archbishop John Bede Polding, Archbishop of Sydney, wrote to the Prefect of the Congregation, Cardinal Giacomo Filippo Fransoni to petition for the erection of an episcopal see at Maitland, recommending Placid Burchall, an English Benedictine, as a suitable candidate as bishop for the new diocese.

On 9 July 1847, the Holy See announced Burchall would become the first Bishop of Maitland and also be Coadjutor Bishop of Sydney. Burchall refused the appointment on grounds of ill-health, however correspondence from Polding to the Holy See suggested it was instead because the order had refused to lose another priest of such high calibre.

By a papal brief dated 27 May 1847, the Titular See of East Maitland was created with the Most Reverend Charles Henry Davis nominated as bishop. Bishop Davis was also the auxiliary bishop to the Archbishop of Sydney and lived in Sydney, never visiting his titular see in East Maitland, therefore the Titular See of East Maitland remained under the administration of the Archdiocese of Sydney until the Most Reverend James Murray was nominated Bishop of Maitland in 1865, taking possession of St John the Baptist Church, West Maitland, as his cathedral on 1 November 1866.

From 1866 the diocese extended to include Port Macquarie, Tamworth, Gunnedah, Walgett and Coonamble. In 1869 the diocese of Armidale was inaugurated with Monsignor Lynch as the administrator. In 1887 the Diocese of Maitland reduced in size by exclusion of the Coonamble, Gunnedah and Tamworth districts, as they became part of the Armidale diocese at the same time as the now Lismore diocese was inaugurated.

In 1933, after servicing the diocese for 87 years, the original cathedral building became inadequate for the needs of the parish and the diocese. In July 1933, Bishop Edmund Gleeson CSsR officially announced that the Catholic Hall in Maitland would be converted to a pro-cathedral suitable as a place of worship. On 26 November 1933 the Catholic Hall was opened as the pro-cathedral and St John's officially closed.

In 1948, the Newcastle and Maitland Catholic Sentinel published a number of articles on the occasion of the consecration of auxiliary bishop Toohey.

In 1966 boundaries were again altered to exclude Kendall parish to Lismore but include the parishes of Belmont, Swansea, Toronto, Booragul and Teralba, which are the present boundaries of the diocese.

In 1967, an article about the state of the diocese after 100 years was published in the newspaper of the diocese, the Catholic Sentinel. (A digitised paper, as part of the "Trove" National Library of Australia project.)

In 1989 the pro-cathedral suffered damage as a result of an earthquake and was closed. Discussions were then held and it was decided to convert the pro-cathedral to its former use as a hall and to reopen St John's as a chapel for the central Maitland area. On 24 June 1994, Bishop Leo Clarke celebrated a dedication of a church service and thus St John's became a chapel for the area. The 1989 earthquake was also a catalyst to consolidate the diocesan administration offices on one site. This was achieved in 1995 by purchasing the Sisters of Mercy convent in Hamilton and the former Sacred Heart parish primary school, Hamilton.

By papal brief dated 14 June 1995, the Diocese of Maitland-Newcastle was created and on 16 July 1995 the Sacred Heart Church in Hamilton became the cathedral of the diocese.

The diocese was the focus of the Hunter Special Commission of Inquiry and case-study 43 in the Royal Commission into Institutional Responses to Child Sexual Abuse.

In April 2024, Cathnews reported briefly on the renewal of the safeguarding leadership in 2024.

== Bishops ==
=== Ordinaries ===
The following individuals have been elected as Roman Catholic Bishop of Maitland:

Order	Name	Date installed	Term ended	Term of office	Reason for term end
1	Charles Henry Davis, OSB †	24 September 1846	17 May 1854	8 years, 235 days	Died in office
2	James Murray †	1865	9 July 1909	44 years, 189 days	Died in office
3	Patrick Dwyer †	9 July 1909	28 March 1931	21 years, 262 days	Died in office
4	Edmund John Aloysius Gleeson, CSSR †	28 March 1931	4 March 1956	24 years, 342 days	Died in office
5	John Thomas Toohey †	4 March 1956	24 September 1975	19 years, 204 days	Died in office
6	Leo Morris Clarke	10 April 1976	3 November 1995	19 years, 207 days	Retired and appointed Bishop Emeritus of Maitland–Newcastle

The following individuals have been elected as Roman Catholic Bishop of Maitland-Newcastle:

Order	Name	Date installed	Term ended	Term of office	Reason for term end
1	Michael Malone	3 November 1995	4 April 2011	15 years, 152 days	Following a 2009 request by Malone for early retirement due to the impact of the sex abuse scandal, which was rejected by the Vatican, Malone resigned in 2011
2	William Wright	4 April 2011	13 November 2021	10 years, 223 days	Died while in office
3	Michael Kennedy	2 February 2023		3 years, 289 days	

=== Coadjutor bishops ===
- Patrick Vincent Dwyer (1897–1909)
- Edmund John Aloysius Gleeson, C.SS.R. (1929–1931)
- John Toohey
- Michael John Malone (1994–1995)

=== Other priests of the diocese who became bishops ===
- Ernest Victor Tweedy, appointed Archbishop of Hobart in 1942
- Philip Edward Wilson, appointed Bishop of Wollongong in 1996
- Brian Gregory Mascord, appointed Bishop of Wollongong in 2017

== Cathedral ==
Sacred Heart Cathedral in Hamilton acts as both the Hamilton parish church and the cathedral for the Diocese of Maitland-Newcastle.

The Sacred Heart Cathedral building was opened in 1930 as the parish church of Hamilton and was consecrated by Bishop Edmund Gleeson in 1941, before becoming Sacred Heart Cathedral on 16 July 1995.

The Sacred Heart Church's foundations were dug with the physical aid of parishioners. The church was built virtually brick by brick on the dream of Monsignor Victor Francis Peters and through the generosity of parishioners who, in the midst of the Great Depression, bought bricks for an average of twopence each. A donation of ten pounds was the norm and, in total, 700,000 bricks were used.

Monsignor Peters was influenced by the architecture of the cathedral in Thurles in Ireland; the cathedral church of Philadelphia in the US and the brick work in front of the Pisa church in Italy. The foundation stone was laid on 23 September 1928. The first brick was laid on 1 February 1929 and the last brick just ten months later on 1 December 1929. Sixty years later, the earthquake of 1989 caused considerable damage particularly to the belltower. The original concrete dome was replaced by one of copper and the original dome now stands as a memorial to those who lost their lives in the earthquake.

== Parishes ==
The following parishes are situated within the diocese:

- All Saints Blackbutt South
- Beresfield
- Blackbutt North
- Boolaroo–Warners Bay
- Booragul
- Branxton
- Cessnock
- Denman
- Dungog
- East Lake Macquarie
- East Maitland
- Forster Tuncurry
- Gloucester
- Gresford
- Krambach
- Kurri Kurri
- Lochinvar
- MacKillop (Charlestown, Gateshead & Redhead)
- Maitland
- Mayfield
- Mayfield West
- Merriwa
- Morisset
- Morpeth
- Murrurundi
- Muswellbrook
- Myall Coast
- Nelson Bay
- Newcastle St Benedict (includes Cathedral)
- Raymond Terrace
- Rutherford
- Scone
- Singleton
- Stockton
- Sugarloaf
- Taree
- Toronto
- Wallsend–Shortland
- Wingham

== Child sexual abuse in the diocese ==
The diocese has been referred to as the "epicentre of Catholic clerical sexual abuse in Australia" due to a number of abusive priests and religious brothers with extensive abuse records being jailed since 1997.

=== Archbishop Philip Wilson ===
In March 2015, NSW Police charged Archbishop Philip Wilson, then the Archbishop of Adelaide, of "concealing a serious offence regarding child sexual abuse in the Hunter region in 1978" when he was a priest in the Maitland-Newcastle diocese. Wilson took leave and issued a statement saying he would "vigorously defend my innocence through the judicial system". Wilson's lawyer attempted to prevent the trial going ahead on medical grounds but this was refused. On 22 May 2018, Wilson was found guilty and sentenced to two years' imprisonment, suspended, which Wilson would serve under home detention.

Pope Francis accepted Wilson's resignation on 30 July 2018. As an archbishop, Wilson was the most senior Catholic cleric in Australia to be convicted of not disclosing abuse by another priest to the police. On 6 December 2018, Wilson was acquitted of all charges.

In September 2021, following Wilson's successful appeal, the fourth volume of the 2014 Special Commission of Inquiry into allegations of cover-up of sexual abuse claims in the Diocese of Maitland-Newcastle found that Wilson was an "unsatisfactory and unimpressive witness" and that he gave evidence the commissioners considered untruthful, self-serving and implausible. They found that Wilson had knowledge of sexual abuse of children committed by Father James Fletcher and Father Denis McAlinden. Wilson died on 17 January 2021.

=== Brother Christopher Wade ===
In June 2017, former Marist Brothers Hamilton headmaster Brother Christopher Wade was found guilty of child sex offences against two former students. He was sentenced to 18 months' imprisonment. On his release, Wade was charged with concealment offences and faced Sydney District Court on 28 February 2020. He pleaded guilty on two counts of failing to provide information to police during a 2014 child sex abuse investigation into Brother Romuald Cable and Brother Dominic O'Sullivan. Wade was sentenced to four months' imprisonment, to be served in the community. In pleading guilty, Wade became the first senior Catholic in Australia to admit to concealing child sex crimes.

=== Father Thomas Brennan ===
In 2012, Father Tom Brennan was arrested and charged with two counts of misprision of felony, or failing to disclose a serious crime, relating to the alleged child sex offences by his colleague Father John Denham. The offences occurred at St Pius X School, Adamstown, where Brennan was the principal and Denham a teacher. Brennan was also charged with eight counts of sexual abuse and two counts of assault. It was the first time anywhere in the world that a senior Catholic church leader had been charged with concealing child abuse. Brennan died of cancer in October 2012 before the charges could be heard in court.

In 2018, the Catholic Church acknowledged Brennan's abuse. Bishop William Wright sent James Miller, one of Brennan's victims, a letter of apology. Wright wrote "As a Catholic priest, I feel great shame that an ordained priest of the Diocese chose to inflict his sexual desires upon you ... Brennan and all those who harmed children fundamentally betrayed their vocation. I am sorry."

=== List of convicted priests and religious brothers ===
The following is a list of priests and religious brothers from the diocese have been convicted of child sexual abuse or had allegations of child sexual abuse against them substantiated by the diocese or their religious order. It also includes senior clergy who concealed child sexual abuse crimes perpetrated by priests in the Diocese:

==== Priests ====
- Bishop John Toohey (Deceased) - Concealed child sexual abuse.
- Bishop Leo Clarke (Deceased) - Concealed child sexual abuse.
- Monsignor Patrick Cotter (Deceased) – Concealed child sexual abuse.
- Father Vincent Ryan (Deceased) – Convicted of child sexual abuse.
- Father David O'Hearn (Prison) – Convicted of child sexual abuse.
- Father John Sidney Denham (Prison) – Convicted of child sexual abuse.
- Father James Fletcher (Deceased) – Convicted of child sexual abuse.
- Father Thomas Brennan (Deceased) – Convicted of child sexual abuse and concealing child sexual abuse.
- Father Albert Davis (Deceased) – Allegations of child sexual abuse substantiated by the Diocese.
- Father Denis McAlinden (Deceased)– Allegations of child sexual abuse substantiated by the Diocese.
- Father Francis Donovan (Deceased)– Allegations of child sexual abuse substantiated by the Diocese, deceased
- Father Kenneth Hodgson (Deceased) – Allegations of child sexual abuse substantiated by the Diocese, deceased
- Father Peter Brock (Deceased) – Allegations of child sexual abuse substantiated by the Diocese.
- Father Peter Quirk (Deceased) – Allegations of child sexual abuse substantiated by the diocese.
- Father William Cantwell (Deceased) – Allegations of child sexual abuse substantiated by the Diocese.
- Paul Lane – Convicted of child sexual abuse
- Father John Charles Houston - Pleaded guilty to two counts of filming children without permission.

==== Religious brothers ====
Where known and applicable, religious names are in quotation marks.

Marist Brothers

- William "Christopher" Wade (Deceased) – Convicted of child sexual abuse and concealing child sexual abuse.
- William Francis "Romuald" Cable (Deceased) – Convicted of child sexual abuse.
- John "Dominic" O'Sullivan (Prison) - Convicted of child sexual abuse.
- John "Dominic" Gleeson (Deceased) – Convicted of child sexual abuse.
- Peter Pemble (Deceased) – Convicted of child sexual abuse.
- Terry Gilsenan (Deceased) – Convicted of child sexual abuse.
- John "Nestor" Littler (Deceased) – Convicted of child sexual abuse.
- Donald Newtown (Deceased) – Allegations of child sexual abuse substantiated by Marist Brothers.
- Noel "Leon" Mackey (Deceased) – Allegations of child sexual abuse substantiated by Marist Brothers, deceased
- Oswin McKinney (Deceased) – Allegations of child sexual abuse substantiated by Marist Brothers.
- Thomas "Patrick" Butler (Deceased) – Allegations of child sexual abuse substantiated by Marist Brothers.
- Stephen Farrell (Deceased) - Allegations of child sexual abuse substantiated by Marist Brothers.

Hospitaller Order of St. John of God

- Bernard McGrath (Prison) - Convicted of child sexual abuse.
- John Marshall Clegg (Prison) - Convicted of child sexual abuse.
- Daniel John Slattery (Prison) – Convicted of child sexual abuse.
- William Lebler (Deceased) – Convicted of child sexual abuse.
- Rodger Moloney (Deceased) – Convicted of child sexual abuse.
- John Joseph "Bede" Donnellan (Deceased) – Allegations of child sexual abuse substantiated by St John of God.
- Raymond "Richard" Garchow (Deceased) – Charged but deemed unfit for extradition to face criminal charges of child sexual abuse in New Zealand.

== See also ==
- Catholicism in Australia
- Joanne McCarthy (journalist)
- Revelation (TV series)
