= Ashmont, New South Wales =

Ashmont Wagga Wagga, New South Wales
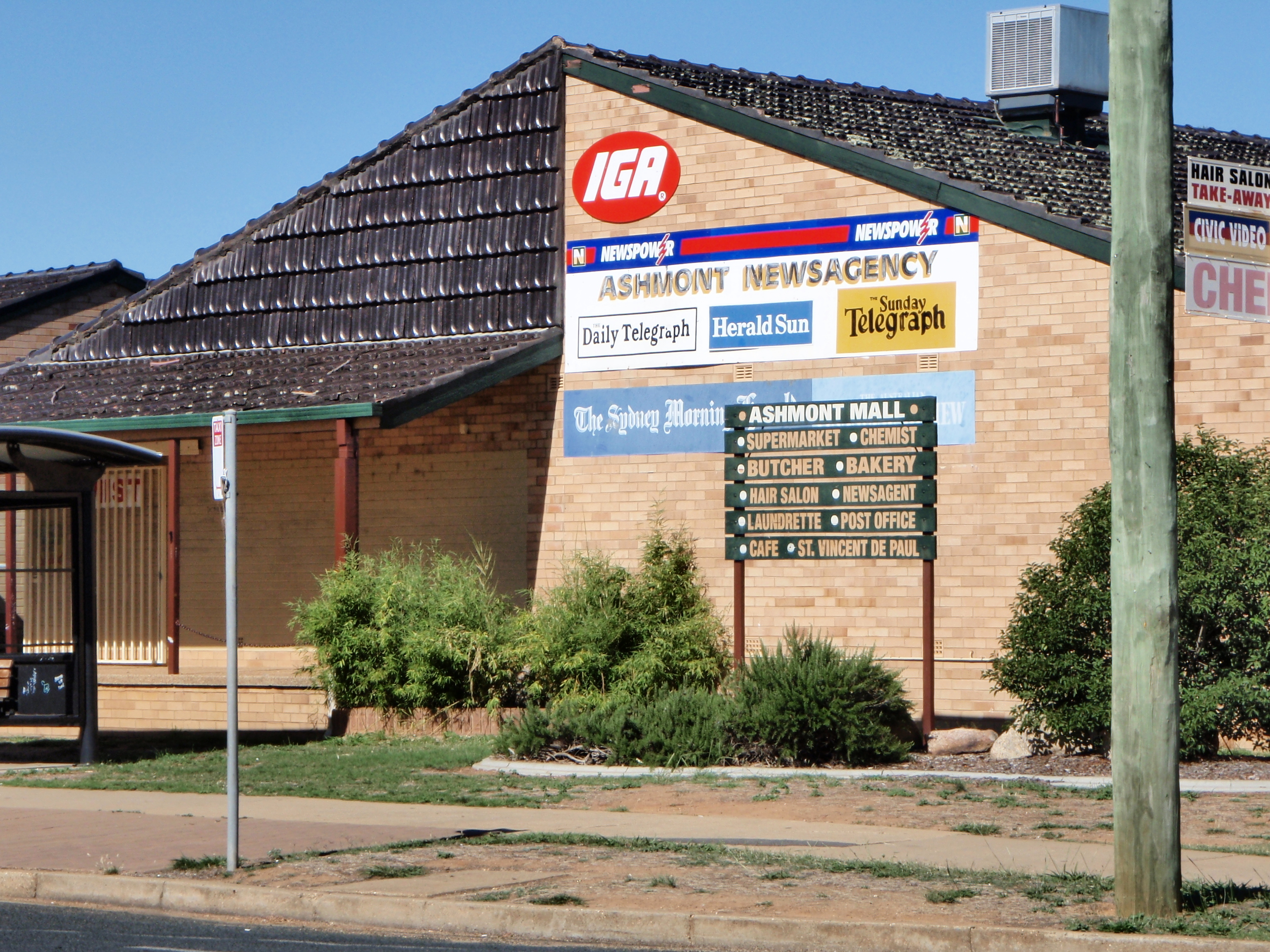
- Ashmont Mall

- Coordinates: 35°7′37.66″S 147°19′55.48″E
- Population: 3,747 (2021 census)
- Postcode(s): 2650
- LGA(s): City of Wagga Wagga
- County: Wynyard
- Parish: South Wagga Wagga
- State electorate(s): Wagga Wagga
- Federal division(s): Riverina
Suburbs around Ashmont:
Moorong	Moorong	Wagga Wagga
San Isidore	Ashmont	Turvey Park
Kapooka	Glenfield Park	Mount Austin

Ashmont, known originally as "J.J. Salmon's Estate" is a south-western suburb of Wagga Wagga, New South Wales, Australia. The suburb is named after the Salmon family's original homestead that was located where the suburb now stands.

Ashmont was first urbanised in the late 1950s, and during the 1970s large areas were developed by the then State Housing Commission (now known as Housing NSW). As of 2019, 21% of dwellings in Ashmont are owned by a federal or state housing authority. The suburb has a high rate of social disadvantage and crime, with crime rates significantly higher compared to state-wide averages.

A small shopping centre, the New South Wales State Emergency Service Murrumbidgee Region and New South Wales Rural Fire Service Riverina Zone Headquarters are located within the suburb.

The Carmelite Monastery, a community of monastic, contemplative nuns, is situated on Morsehead Street.

== Demographics ==
At the 2021 census, the median age in Ashmont was 36, younger than the national average of 38. Aboriginal and/or Torres Strait Islander people constituted 20% of the population, significantly higher than the national average of 3.2%.

83.1% of residents were born in Australia, substantially higher than the national average of 66.9%. The most common responses for religion were No Religion 34.1%, Catholic 23% and Anglican 17.1% (10.7% of respondents did not answer the question). Christianity was the largest religious group reported overall, at 57.8% (excluding not stated responses).

9.2% of residents reported being unemployed, nearly double the national average. Median incomes in the suburb were notably lower than average: the median weekly personal income reported was $577, compared to $805 nationally. The median weekly household income was $994, compared to $1,746 nationally. A plurality of families with children, 27.3% had neither parent working.
