= Peter Ingham (bishop) =

Australian bishop (1941–2024)

The Most Reverend Peter Ingham AM
- Bishop Emeritus of Wollongong
- Church: St Francis Xavier's Cathedral, Wollongong
- Archdiocese: Sydney
- Province: Sydney
- Diocese: Wollongong
- Elected: 6 June 2001
- Installed: 25 July 2001
- Term ended: 22 February 2018
- Predecessor: Philip Wilson
- Successor: Brian Mascord
- Previous post: Titular Bishop of Pudentiana (1993–2001)

Orders
- Ordination: 18 July 1964 (priest) in St Mary's Cathedral, Sydney by Norman Gilroy
- Consecration: 12 July 1993 (bishop) by Edward Clancy

Personal details
- Born: Peter William Ingham; 14 January 1941 Crows Nest, New South Wales, Australia
- Died: 26 April 2024 (aged 83) Wollongong, New South Wales, Australia
- Denomination: Roman Catholic Church
- Occupation: Roman Catholic bishop
- Profession: Bishop
- Education: St Patrick's Seminary, Manly
- Motto: Per ipsum ipsa duce ("Through Him, under her leadership")

Peter William Ingham AM (14 January 1941 – 26 April 2024) was an Australian bishop. He was the fourth Roman Catholic bishop of the Diocese of Wollongong, serving from 2001 to 2018. From March 2020 until December 2020, he served as apostolic administrator of the Diocese of Broome.

== Early years ==
Ingram was born in Crows Nest, New South Wales, to George and Marjorie (née Hyndes) Ingham. His early education was completed at St Leonard's Primary School in Naremburn and St Pius X College in Chatswood. He studied for the priesthood at St Columba's Seminary in Springwood and St Patrick's Seminary, Manly. He was ordained a priest by Cardinal Gilroy at St Mary's Cathedral, Sydney, on 18 July 1964.

Ingham served as an assistant priest in Rosebery, Newtown, St Mary's and Auburn South (all New South Wales). He was the private secretary to Cardinal Freeman and secretary of the Archdiocese of Sydney.

Ingham was nominated as a monsignor by Pope John Paul II in 1986. In 1990 he was appointed parish priest of St Charles Ryde. He was appointed an auxiliary bishop in the Sydney archdiocese on 24 May 1993 and consecrated on 12 July by Cardinal Edward Clancy as the Titular Bishop of Pudentiana.

== Bishop of Wollongong ==
Styles of Peter Ingham
- Reference style: The Most Reverend
- Spoken style: His Lordship or My Lord Bishop
- Religious style: Bishop

Ingham was appointed to his bishopric on 6 June 2001 and installed as the fourth Bishop of Wollongong on 25 July 2001.

Ingham was a member of the Bishops Commission for Liturgy and the Bishops Commission for Mission and Faith Formation. In 2006 he was elected President of the Federation of Catholic Bishops Conferences of Oceania. In October 2008 he participated in the 12th Synod of Bishops at the Vatican.

In September 2009, Ingham was appointed by Pope Benedict XVI to participate in the Special Assembly for Africa of the Synod of Bishops, themed "The Church in Africa, at the Service of Reconciliation, Justice and Peace", that was held from 4 to 25 October at the Vatican.

On 16 March 2007, Ingham dedicated the renovated St Francis Xavier's Cathedral, Wollongong, as a sacred place, not previously undertaken by church officials despite over 162 years of service at the location.

== Retirement and death ==
Ingham announced his retirement on 30 November 2017. Brian Mascord was immediately appointed to succeed Ingham as Bishop of Wollongong and was installed on 22 February 2018. Ingham died on 26 April 2024, at the age of 83.

=== Apostolic administrator of Broome ===
On 11 March 2020, Archbishop of Perth Timothy Costelloe released a statement confirming Ingham had been appointed apostolic administrator of the Roman Catholic Diocese of Broome after Bishop of Broome Christopher Saunders, who was being investigated by the Vatican for sex abuse allegations, "voluntarily stood aside from the ordinary administration of the diocese."

== Honours ==
In 2022, Ingham was appointed a Member of the Order of Australia in the 2022 Queen's Birthday Honours for "significant service to the Catholic Church in Australia".

Catholic Church titles
Preceded by Philip Wilson	Bishop of Wollongong; 2001–2018	Succeeded by Brian Mascord
Preceded by Óscar Rodríguez Maradiaga	Titular Bishop of Pudentiana; 1993–2001	Succeeded by Sérgio Aparecido Colombo
