= San Isidore, New South Wales =

Coordinates: 35°06′39″S 147°17′13″E

San Isidore Wagga Wagga, New South Wales
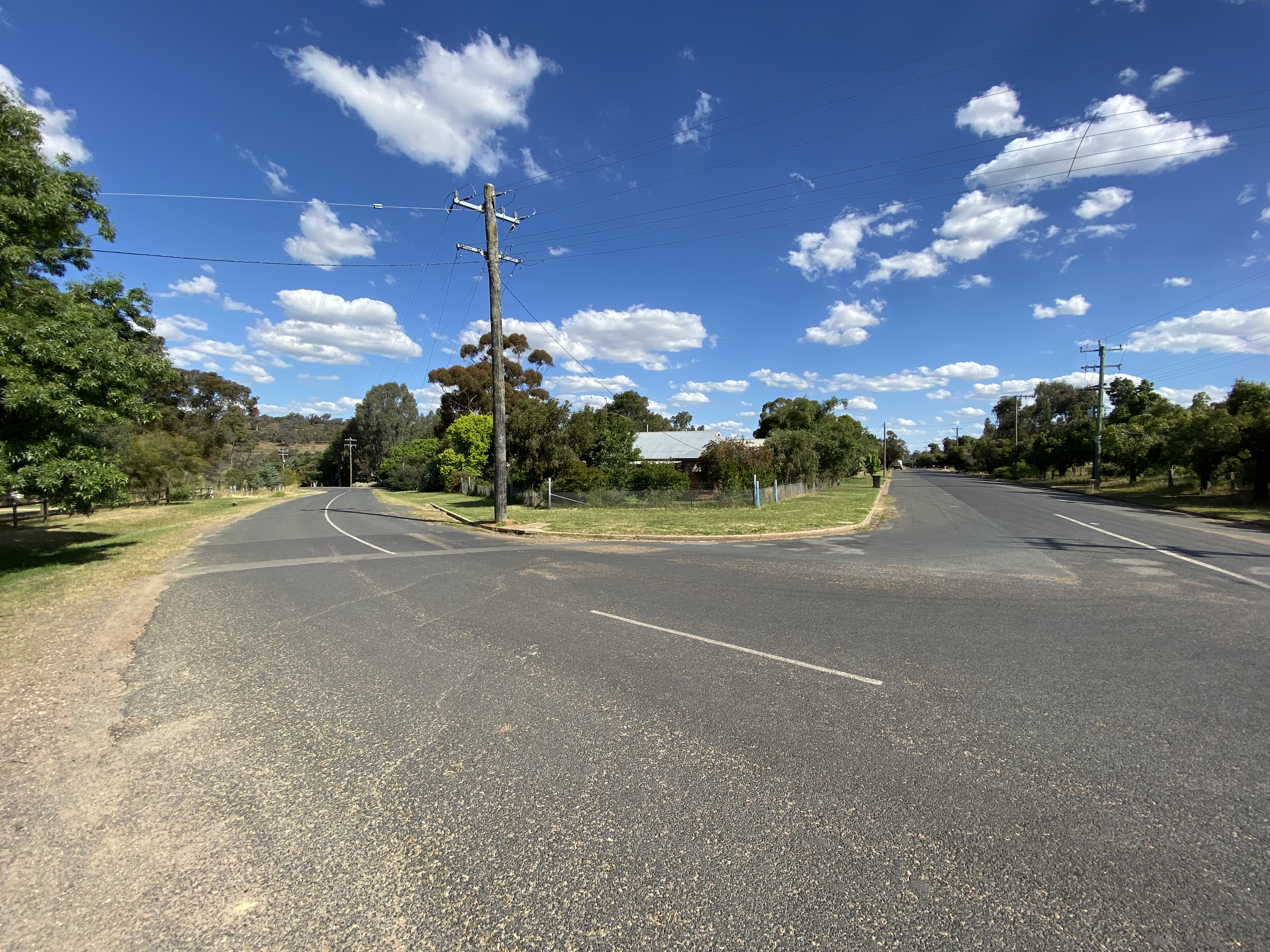
- Intersection of Benedict and Eugene Avenue in San Isidore
- Population: 381 (2016 census)
- LGA(s): City of Wagga Wagga
- County: Mitchell
- Parish: Uranquinty
- State electorate(s): Wagga Wagga
- Federal division(s): Riverina
Suburbs around San Isidore:
| | Moorong |
| San Isidore | Ashmont |
| | Kapooka |

San Isidore is a rural suburb located on the outskirts of the city of Wagga Wagga, New South Wales, Australia.
