= William Wright (Australian bishop) =

Australian bishop (1952–2021)

The Most Reverend William Wright
- Church: Roman Catholic
- Archdiocese: Sydney
- Diocese: Maitland-Newcastle
- In office: 15 June 2011 – 15 September 2021
- Predecessor: Michael Malone
- Successor: Michael Kennedy

Orders
- Ordination: 20 August 1977
- Consecration: 15 June 2011 by George Pell

Personal details
- Born: William Joseph Wright; 26 October 1952 Washington, DC, United States
- Died: 13 November 2021 (aged 69) Maitland, New South Wales, Australia

William Joseph Wright (26 October 1952 – 13 November 2021) was the eighth bishop of the Roman Catholic Diocese of Maitland-Newcastle in Australia. He was consecrated on 15 June 2011.

== Early life ==
Wright was born on 26 October 1952 in Washington DC, where his father worked as an economist at the International Monetary Fund. He was the third and youngest child of Jack and Nan Wright. His family moved back to Sydney less than a after his birth.

He was educated by the Sisters of Mercy at Pymble for his primary school and then by the Jesuits at St Aloysius' College in Sydney and Wimbledon College in London, England, while his father was the manager of the Reserve Bank of Australia in London.

During a Year 10 retreat, a talk from a Jesuit speaker triggered his desire to join the priesthood, with him feeling: "I’m just what the church needs". His studies for the priesthood were at St Columba's College in Springwood and St Patrick's College in Manly. Wright was ordained a deacon in 1976.

== Priesthood ==
On 20 August 1977, Wright was ordained a priest for the Archdiocese of Sydney at St Mary's Cathedral, Sydney by Archbishop James Darcy Freeman.

His first appointment was as an assistant priest at Stanmore. Following this, he took a four year study break and gained a Bachelor of Arts with honours, largely in history, at University of Sydney in 1984.

He then served as vice-rector of St Patrick's College in Manly from 1985 to 1991. In 1992, he went on loan to the Diocese of Parramatta and served as an assistant priest in the parish of Mount Druitt. He was appointed assistant secretary to the Australian Catholic Bishops Conference in Canberra in 1995.

In 1996, he assistant at the parish of Fairfield before serving as administrator of Enmore for six months. In 1997, he was appointed Parish Priest of Dulwich Hill and in 1999, became parish priest of Bonnyrigg. In 2006, he took an opportunity to minister in Moree in the Diocese of Armidale. In 2008, he returned to Sydney and served as parish priest of Sutherland before being appointed parish priest of Liverpool in 2009.

== Episcopate ==
On 4 April 2011, Wright was appointed Bishop of Maitland-Newcastle by Pope Benedict XVI, following the resignation of Bishop Michael Malone, who said he was emotionally drained by the scale of sexual abuse within the diocese.

Wright was consecrated a bishop on 15 June 2011 at Sacred Heart Cathedral, Hamilton by Cardinal George Pell. As a bishop, he served as the co-chair of the National Committee for Professional Standards. He served on the Truth Justice and Healing Council as well as several Australian bishops' commissions, including Church Ministry, Ecumenism and Inter-Religious Relations, Evangelization, Laity, and Ministry, and Social Justice, Mission and Service. He was also Chair of the Bishops Commission for Professional Standards and Safeguarding.

Inheriting the pastoral care of a diocese which had been hit hard by historical clerical sexual abuse, Wright worked hard to safeguard children and adults at risk, while also supporting survivors. He established a Diocesan service for pastoral healing and support, was a member of the Truth, Justice and Healing Council and chaired the Bishops Commission for Professional Standards and Safeguarding, which oversees the National Catholic Safeguarding Standards. He also ensured the Church introduced reforms to promote the safety and wellbeing of children.

He undertook a restoration of the St John's Pro-Cathedral, Maitland, which had served as the Cathedral for the Diocese for several decades.

== Illness and death ==
On 15 September 2021, Wright announced that he had submitted his resignation to Pope Francis on the grounds of ill health. He died of terminal lung cancer on 13 November 2021, while still Bishop of Maitland-Newcastle.

Catholic Church titles
Preceded by Michael Malone	Bishop of Maitland–Newcastle; 2011–2021	Succeeded by Michael Kennedy
