= Leo Clarke (bishop) =

Australian bishop (1923–2006)

The Most Reverend Leo Clarke
- Bishop of Maitland
- Diocese: Maitland
- Appointed: 10 April 1976
- Term ended: 3 November 1995
- Predecessor: John Toohey

Orders
- Ordination: 24 July 1949 by Daniel Mannix
- Consecration: 2 June 1976 by James Darcy Freeman

Personal details
- Born: Leo Morris Clarke; 29 August 1923
- Died: 3 June 2006 (aged 82)
- Denomination: Roman Catholic

Leo Morris Clarke (29 August 1923 – 3 June 2006) was an Australian bishop of the Roman Catholic Diocese of Maitland in New South Wales from 1976 to 1995.

Following the death of Bishop John Toohey in September 1975, Clarke was ordained the sixth bishop of the diocese in June 1976 after 27 years in the Archdiocese of Melbourne, where he served as a priest and the Master of Ceremonies at St Patrick's Cathedral under Archbishop Daniel Mannix.

As bishop, Clarke was instrumental in implementing a program of renewal the diocesan community. He initiated the synod of 1992–93, a sustained consultation process involving clergy and laity coming to grips with the issues raised by the Second Vatican Council. His major rationalisation of Newcastle's Catholic secondary schools was controversial at the time and caused him enormous pain.

His successor, Bishop Michael Malone, told the Hunter Commission of Inquiry that when Clarke handed over the office to him, he slid a large ornamental cross across the desk and pointed to a "rather large briefcase that sat in the corner of his office". Malone asked Clarke if he was going to show him "where the skeletons are, where the secret things are?" but Clarke merely responded "Ah you will find out soon enough."

After his resignation in 1996, he became Bishop Emeritus of Maitland-Newcastle.

== Child sexual abuse scandal ==
During his time as Bishop of Maitland-Newcastle, Clarke concealed the sexual crimes of abusive priests in the diocese, including Denis McAlinden, James Fletcher, David O'Hearn and Vincent Ryan.

Monsignor Patrick Cotter had warned Clarke that Father McAlinden had a predilection for touching young girls. McAlinden continued to abuse children until 1993, when Clarke brought Father Brian Lucas in to convince McAlinden to resign. Neither Clarke nor Lucas reported McAlinden to the police.

In 1996, Clarke and Cotter were interviewed by NSW Police in relation to the sexual abuse of children by Father Vincent Ryan. A brief of evidence, recommending Cotter be prosecuted for concealing a serious crime, was sent to the Director of Public Prosecutions. The case against Cotter never proceeded due to his age. and Clarke died in 2006.

In 2016, Bishop Michael Malone told the Royal Commission into Institutional Responses to Child Sexual Abuse that Clarke had told him that Ryan had "offended many times". Clarke had sent Ryan for therapy in Melbourne and returned to ministry without any supervision. Malone said Clarke did not reveal a great deal more about Ryan's offending but conceded the bishop and church had covered-up Ryan's abuse of children for decades.

The Diocese of Maitland-Newcastle has acknowledged the failures of leadership, including Clarke and Cotter, in concealing child sexual abuse, failing to protect children and inadequate pastoral care to survivors of clerical abuse. The diocese offered a public apology to the Special Commission of Inquiry in 2013 and Bishop Wright read a statement of apology and admitted past failings during the 2014 sitting of the Royal Commission into Institutional Responses to Child Sexual Abuse.

What has been ignored by the media and the Royal Commission is that after Clarke's resignation in 1996 he visited his estranged brother on the Gold Coast and confided that he had lost faith in the Catholic church and resigned. Bishop Clarke stated that he resigned because of the many cover up's of child sexual abuse crimes that had continued over the years in his time as Bishop of Maitland. Bishop Clarke was not accused of covering up child sexual abuse crimes until after he died in 2006. Bishop Clarke was not given the opportunity, before his death, to defend himself against the allegations made against him that he covered up and enabled child sex abuse.

In 2020, in advance of the broadcast of ABC's series Revelation, Bishop William Wright ordered the removal of a plaque in Maitland Cathedral celebrating the life of Clarke.

== Bibliography ==
- Clarke, Leo M. (June 2003). "Archbishop Mannix: what was he like?". Footprints: Journal of the Melbourne Diocesan Historical Commission: 28–48.
