= Peter Murphy (bishop) =

Australian catholic bishop

The Most Reverend Peter Murphy
- Bishop of Armidale
- Diocese: Armidale

Orders
- Ordination: 11 July 1992 by William John Brennan
- Consecration: 8 May 2025 by Anthony Fisher

Personal details
- Born: Peter Mel Murphy; 28 June 1961 (age 65) Benalla, Victoria, Australia
- Denomination: Catholic Church
- Education: Pontifical University of Saint Thomas Aquinas; Pontifical Urban University
- Motto: In Omnibus Caritas
- Coat of arms

Peter Mel Murphy (born 28 June 1961) is an Australian Catholic prelate, who is currently serving as the Bishop of the Diocese of Armidale.

== Early life ==
Murphy was born in Benalla, Victoria, in the diocese of Sandhurst, the fourth of six children born to Mel and Florence Murphy.

He received his primary education from the Faithful Companions of Jesus at St Joseph's Primary School, Benalla and his secondary education from the Marist Brothers at Assumption College, Kilmore. After working for the bank and other "sundry" employments, he attended University of Melbourne, Dookie campus to complete a degree in agriculture. He worked as a field agronomist in Melbourne.

In 1985, he responded to a call to the priesthood and was accepted as a seminarian for the Diocese of Wagga Wagga by Bishop William John Brennan. Brennan had become concerned with the state of seminary formation in Australia, particularly at St Patrick's Seminary, Manly where he believed the situation had become dire, with lax discipline and orthodox seminarians often being refused entry.

Brennan sent Murphy to Rome to complete his studies. He gained a Bachelor of Sacred Theology from the Pontifical University of Saint Thomas Aquinas (Angelicum) and a Licentiate in Theology from the Pontifical Urban University.

=== Priesthood ===
Murphy returned to Australia and on 11 July 1992, was ordained a priest for the Diocese of Wagga Wagga at St Michael's Cathedral, Wagga Wagga by Bishop William John Brennan.

His first appointment was as parish vicar of South Wagga, while he also lectured in philosophy and moral theology at Vianney College, Wagga Wagga. In 1994, he was appointed vice-rector of the seminary. In 1997, he was appointed parish priest of Lockhart.

He returned to Rome to study in 2000 and in 2002, completed a Doctorate in Sacred Theology at the Pontifical Urban University. While studying, he also served at the Congregation for the Evangelization of Peoples.

He returned to Australia in 2002 and became parish priest of Tumbarumba, then in 2007, became parish priest of Lavington. He also served as a member of the College of Consultors, was dean of the Deanery of Murray and vicar general. He also served as diocesan director for vocations and youth, chaplain at Charles Stuart University in Wagga Wagga, and lecturer at the Pontifical “John Paul II” Theological Institute for Marriage and Family Science in Melbourne.

In early 2025, he was appointed Administrator of St Michael’s Cathedral, Wagga Wagga.

=== Episcopate ===
On 27 February 2025, he was appointed Bishop of the Diocese of Armidale by Pope Francis, ending a two-year vacancy in the Diocese.

On 8 May 2025, he was consecrated and installed as Bishop of Armidale at Saints Mary and Joseph Catholic Cathedral, Armidale by Archbishop Anthony Fisher OP.

He was appointed to the Australian Bishops’ Commission for Doctrine and Morals.

In 2025, he helped to the establish the Immaculata Community as a canonically approved Public Association of Christ’s Faithful in the Diocese of Armidale.

Catholic Church titles
Preceded by Michael Kennedy	Bishop of Armidale; 2025–present	Incumbent
