= John Coleman (bishop) =

Irish-born Australian Catholic bishop (1887–1947

The Most Reverend John Coleman
- Bishop of Diocese of Armidale
- Diocese: Armidale
- Installed: 15 July 1932
- Term ended: 22 December 1947
- Predecessor: Patrick Joseph O'Connor
- Successor: Edward John Doody

Orders
- Ordination: 22 March 1912 at
- Consecration: 8 September 1929 at Saints Mary and Joseph Catholic Cathedral, Armidale by Michael Sheehan

Personal details
- Born: John Aloysius Coleman; 8 September 1887 Mount Melleray, Cappoquin, Ireland
- Died: 22 December 1947 (aged 60) Sydney, New South Wales, Australia
- Denomination: Catholic Church
- Occupation: Catholic bishop

John Aloysius Coleman (8 September 1887 – 22 December 1947) was an Irish-born Australian bishop of the Catholic Church, who served as Bishop of Armidale.

== Early life ==
Coleman was born in Mount Melleray, close to the Mount Melleray Abbey. He received his primary schooling at the school attached to the abbey, then onto the seminary attached to the abbey. He was then sent to the Pontifical Urban University in Rome to further his studies. His brother became a priest for the Archdiocese of Brisbane and his sister became a Dominican nun.

== Priesthood ==
Coleman was ordained on 22 March 1912 in Rome for the Diocese of Armidale. He came to Australia in 1913 and received his first appointment as an assistant at Saints Mary and Joseph Catholic Cathedral, Armidale.

He was appointed administrator of the Saints Mary and Joseph Catholic Cathedral in 1925.

== Episcopate ==
On 31 May 1929, Coleman was appointed coadjutor bishop of Armidale. He was consecrated as bishop by Archbishop Michael Sheehan, coadjutor archbishop of Sydney, on 28 May 1922.

On 15 July 1932, he succeeded Bishop Patrick O’Connor as Bishop of Armidale, following O'Connor's death.

== Death ==
On 22 December 1947, Coleman died at St Vincent's Hospital, Darlinghurst. He had been in ill-health for some weeks and travelled to Brisbane for medical attention before being sent to Sydney for treatment. He was buried in Saints Mary and Joseph Catholic Cathedral, Armidale.

Catholic Church titles
Preceded by Patrick Joseph O'Connor	Bishop of Armidale; 1932–1947	Succeeded by Edward John Doody
Preceded by –	Titular Bishop of Verbe; 1929–1932	Succeeded by Emile Barthes
