= Gerard Hanna =

Australian bishop (born 1941)

The Most Reverend Gerard Hanna
- Bishop Emeritus of the Roman Catholic Diocese of Wagga Wagga
- Diocese: Wagga Wagga
- Appointed: 5 February 2002
- Installed: 15 May 2002
- Term ended: 12 September 2016
- Predecessor: William John Brennan
- Successor: Mark Edwards

Orders
- Ordination: 9 December 1968 by Bishop Henry Kennedy
- Consecration: 15 May 2002 by Archbishop Francis Carroll

Personal details
- Born: Gerard Joseph Hanna; 22 December 1941 (age 84) Armidale, New South Wales, Australia
- Denomination: Roman Catholic
- Education: St Columba's College, Springwood; St Patrick's College, Manly; University of London
- Motto: To Proclaim Love

Styles of Gerard Hanna
- Reference style: The Most Reverend
- Spoken style: My Lord
- Religious style: Bishop

Gerard Joseph Hanna (born 22 December 1941) is the bishop emeritus of the Roman Catholic Diocese of Wagga Wagga. He was previously a priest in the Roman Catholic Diocese of Armidale. He was consecrated by Archbishop Francis Carroll at Joyes Hall, Wagga Wagga, on 15 May 2002.

== Early life ==
Hanna was born on 22 December 1941 in Armidale, New South Wales, into a high-profile, local business family. He studied for the priesthood at St Columba's College, Springwood and St Patrick's College, Manly and attained a Post-Graduate Diploma in Pastoral Theology from Heythrop College, University of London.

== Priesthood ==
Hanna was ordained a priest on 9 December 1968 at Saints Mary and Joseph Catholic Cathedral, Armidale, by Bishop Henry Kennedy. He was initially posted to Inverell as an assistant priest and then St Nicholas Catholic Church, East Tamworth. He was then an assistant priest at Moree. He left to study in London and then returned in 1981 as a supply priest.

In 1982, he was appointed to South Tamworth for 18 months and then returned to East Tamworth as administrator, where he remained for 18 years.

== Episcopacy ==
On 5 February 2002, Pope John Paul II appointed Hanna as Bishop of Wagga Wagga. He was ordained and installed by Archbishop Francis Carroll at Joyes Hall, Wagga Wagga on 15 May 2002.

== Retirement ==
On 12 September 2016, citing ill health, Hanna's resignation was accepted by Pope Francis. He moved back to his home town to spend his retirement years alongside family and occasionally celebrates Mass at Saint Mary of the Angels, Guyra.

In 2018, The Sydney Morning Herald published an article alleging Hanna turned a blind eye and was embroiled in a cover-up of sexual offending against minors by paedophile priest John Farrell. Hanna had been administrator of a parish in Tamworth East and Farrell was moved to the parish by Bishop Henry Kennedy.

Hanna told the Royal Commission into Institutional Responses to Child Sexual Abuse he had been warned of Farrell's offending by Bishop Kennedy but that his knowledge was "limited". Farrell was placed on restrictive ministry under the watch of Hanna. The article alleged Hanna authorised the use of Church funds to pay a highly regarded silk, Chester Porter, to defend him. Hanna told the Royal Commission he did not pay the legal bill, but forwarded it to the Diocese of Armidale for payment.

An article in The Catholic Weekly, defended Hanna, citing evidence in the Royal Commission he had warned against ordaining Farrell. When Farrell was placed under Hanna's care, he made sure to warn the assistant priests, school principals and a local nun about his offending. Hanna also warned a family, who Farrell spent time around, of the allegations. It noted when Farrell was charged, Hanna stood him down from ministry but did not have the ability to suspend his faculties.

The Whitlam Report, a 2012 inquiry into the Farrell case conducted by former Federal Court judge Antony Whitlam QC, concluded it was "fortuitous" Farrell was placed with Hanna because of the supervision he provided which kept him from re-offending. It also revealed that Hanna funded Farrell's defence from parish funds.

Catholic Church titles
| Preceded by William John Brennan | Bishop of Wagga Wagga; 2002–2016 | Succeeded by Mark Edwards |
