= Caroline Ann Rowland =

Ursuline nun, religious leader and teacher

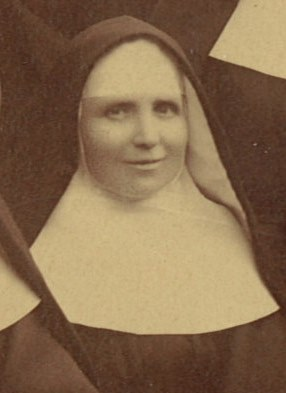
- Born: December 31, 1852; Kentish Town London
- Died: March 11, 1921 (aged 68)
- Other names: Mary Cordula
- Occupation: Catholic Nun
- Notable work: Founder of St Ursula's College, Armidale, NSW

Caroline Ann Rowland (1852–1921) was a Roman Catholic nun in the Order of St Ursula (religious name Sister/Mother Mary Cordula). In 1882 she founded St Ursula's College in Armidale, New South Wales, Australia.

== Early life ==
Caroline Ann Rowland was born on 31 December 1852 at Kentish Town, London, England. She was the daughter of railway clerk George Rowland and his wife Caroline Agnes (née Reeves).

Having a proficiency in languages, in about 1870 she began teaching in a day and boarding school for girls run by the Ursuline Sisters in Duderstadt near Hanover.

== Religious life ==
Rowland entered the Ursuline Order in Duderstadt and made her religious profession in October 1873, taking the religious name Mary Cordula. In June 1877 the anti-Catholic Falk laws expelled the order from their convent. Sister Mary Cordula and a German nun went to England, arriving in Dover on 24 June 1877. In Greenwich the two nuns found an empty building (a former boy's orphanage) at 70 Crooms Hill which they leased for 50 years. More nuns came from Duderstadt, and the order opened St Ursula's Convent School with 25 pupils. In Greenwich the order was assisted by Capuchin priest Father Elzear Torreggiani.

In 1879 Torreggiani was appointed Bishop of Armidale and he invited the Ursulines at Greenwich to establish their order in New South Wales. In 1882 Sister Mary Cordula and nine other nuns undertook a 3-month voyage to Sydney, where they attended the opening ceremony of St Mary's Cathedral on 8 September, after which they travelled overland to Armidale where they established their first convent and school. From there the order extended into other towns of New South Wales and Queensland.

Mother Cordula held the office of Superioress for twelve years of the Armidale Convent, and was one of the most indefatigable members of her order. During her 39 years in Australia Mother Cordula was committed to the education of children and the formation of their good character.

She was also known as artist, painting many religious pictures and many illuminated manuscripts. One of her paintings was of the ship Duchess of Edinburgh on which she immigrated to Australia.

She was broadminded and maintained friendly relationships with the wider community.

== Later life ==
In October 1920 Mother Mary Cordula began to develop paralysis. On medical advice she entered Lewisham Hospital, where she was cared for by the Little Company of Mary. After four months she died in Lewisham Hospital on the morning of Friday 11 March 1921 in her 69th year of life and her 48th year of her religious profession.

Her funeral took place at Armidale on Sunday 13 March 1921.
