= St Michael's Cathedral, Wagga Wagga =

Catholic cathedral in Australia

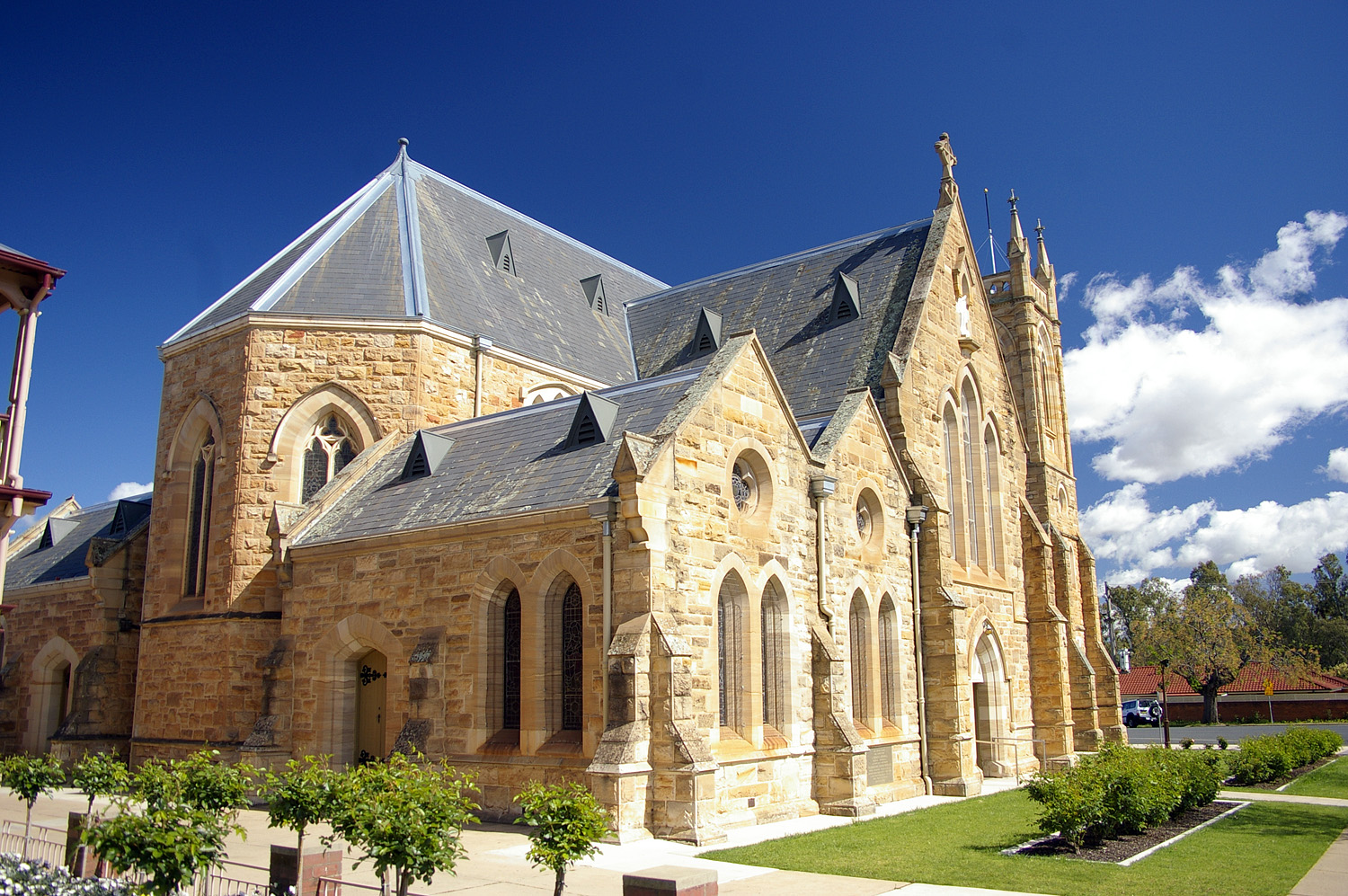
- Church Street view

Religion
- Affiliation: Catholic Church (Latin Church)
- District: Diocese of Wagga Wagga
- Ecclesiastical or organizational status: Cathedral
- Leadership: Mark Edwards OMI
- Year consecrated: 2 October 1887 (as St Michael's Church); 22 March 1925 (as St Michael's Cathedral)

Location
- Location: Wagga Wagga, Australia
- Interactive map of St Michael's Cathedral, Wagga Wagga
- Coordinates: 35°06′24″S 147°22′24″E

Architecture
- Architects: Tappin, Gilbert & Dennehy (initial church); W. J. Monks (renovation and expansion)
- Groundbreaking: 26 April 1885 (initial foundation stone laid)
- Completed: 1 October 1887

St Michael's Cathedral, Wagga Wagga is the cathedral church of the Diocese of Wagga Wagga and the seat of the Catholic Bishop of Wagga Wagga, New South Wales, Australia, currently the Most Reverend Mark Edwards OMI.

== History ==
The first churches in Wagga Wagga began to appear in the mid-19th century, with an Anglican, Presbyterian and Catholic church all being built between 1859 and 1869 in Church Street. The original St Michael's Church was built in the late 1850s, with the foundation stone laid on 27 September 1858 by Reverend Michael McAlroy of the Yass Diocese (now the Archdiocese of Canberra and Goulburn). There was no resident priest in Wagga until the 1870s.

When Father Patrick Dunne was transferred to Wagga Wagga in 1883, he set about planning a new church for the growing Catholic population in the area. The plans for the new church were designed by Tuppin, Gilbert and Dennihey, architects from Melbourne. The stonework was to be completed by Mr Gibbs and Charles Hardy was to complete the carpentry.

On 26 April 1885, building commenced on the church and a foundation stone was laid. The new church was then opened over the weekend of 1 October 1887. The church was then consecrated on 2 October 1887.

=== Cathedral ===
On 28 July 1917, a brief issued from the Vatican announced the erection of the Diocese of Wagga Wagga, created from territory which had previously been part of the southern and western regions of the Goulburn Diocese (now the Archdiocese of Canberra and Goulburn). Joseph Wilfrid Dwyer, formerly the parish priest of Temora, who was consecrated the first bishop of Wagga Wagga on 13 October 1918 and immediately set about renovating the church to transform it from a parish church to a Diocesan cathedral.

The existing St Michael's Church had been left incomplete since its construction, with only a nave, with the rest of the building shabbily boarded up. Plans were set up to complete the church, with works including: east and west transepts with two side chapels, altar, recesses, and four side altars, priests, and acolytes' sacristies, nuns' chapel, confessionals, remodelling, enlarging and elevating the sanctuary, and tiling portions, new high altar, sanctuary and Communion railings and pulpit, new baptistry, new central main entrance porch to Johnston-street, with narthex, completion of tower and belfry, electric light installation, with a thorough system of ventilation for the whole of the building. The new exterior stonework corresponded with the existing building and the new roof was slated.

Architect W. J. Monks designed the new cathedral. The scarcity of capable stonemasons in the Commonwealth, let alone in country centres near Wagga, meant the tender of Garnett and Whiteoak, stonemasons from Parramatta, was accepted for the work, and supplies had to brought on railway from across the state.

The work on completing the church began in January 1922 and a foundation stone for the final work was like on 7 May 1922. On 22 March 1925, the cathedral was opened and blessed by the Apostolic Delegate to Australia, Archbishop Bartolomeo Cattaneo. The opening was also attended by Archbishop of Melbourne Daniel Mannix, Archbishop of Sydney Michael Kelly, Archbishop of Brisbane James Duhig, Archbishop of Perth Patrick Clune, Archbishop of Adelaide Robert Spence and Coadjutor Archbishop of Sydney Michael Sheehan. A number of other bishops from across the country also attended.
