= Francis Henschke =

Australian Catholic bishop (1892–1968)

The Most Reverend Francis Augustin Henschke
- 2nd Roman Catholic Bishop
- Diocese: Wagga Wagga
- Installed: 16 November 1939
- Term ended: 24 February 1968
- Predecessor: Joseph Wilfrid Dwyer
- Successor: Francis Carroll

Orders
- Ordination: 2 June 1917 (Priest)
- Consecration: 15 August 1937(Bishop)

Personal details
- Born: 2 January 1892 Hookina South Australia, Australia
- Died: 24 February 1968 (aged 76) Wagga Wagga, New South Wales, Australia
- Buried: Crypt of St Michael's Cathedral, Wagga Wagga, New South Wales, Australia
- Denomination: Roman Catholic Church
- Parents: August Henschke and Anne Michael
- Occupation: Roman Catholic bishop

Francis Augustin Henschke (2 January 1892 – 24 February 1968) was an Australian Catholic bishop.

On 2 January 1892, Francis Augustin Henschke was born into a Polish-German family, in Hookina, which is located in the South Australian outback. His parents were August Henschke and Anne Michael. On 16 November 1939, he was appointed the Bishop of Wagga Wagga. He kept this position until his death on 24 February 1968. Henschke Primary School, Wagga Wagga, is named after him.

== Family ==
The Henschke line began in Australia when George Henschke and his Polish wife, along with their first daughter and seven children from his first marriage, migrated to Australia from Posen, Poland. George's daughter later became Sister M. Annette, who was a founding member of the Sisters of St Joseph of the Sacred Heart, whose most notable member is Mary MacKillop. His maternal grandparents both came from Bavaria, his maternal grandfather, John Michael, migrated to South Australia in 1848 with Franz Weikert, who went on to form the Sevenhill settlement. His maternal grandmother immigrated in 1854. On 2 January 1892, Francis Augustin Henschke was born to parents August Henschke and Anne Michael. He had 8 siblings, six brothers and two sisters, and another two sisters had died early in life. His whole family was quite tall, with Bishop Henschke's 6' 4" not being the tallest in the family. Seven of his family members devoted themselves to God and religious life. His two sisters became religious sisters, one brother a brother and three brothers (including him) became priests.

== Early life ==
His early education was provided by both his parents, and a small local school. Later, he was enrolled at Sacred Heart College, Glenelg, South Australia. There he completed his secondary studies. Shortly thereafter, he took up a teaching position for the Department of Education in Adelaide, South Australia. He soon offered himself as a candidate for priesthood to The Reverend John H. Norton, the Bishop of Port Augusta.

== Priestly studies ==
To do his study of philosophy, he was sent to Ireland, studying at the famous monastic college of Mount Melleray Abbey, then headed to Propaganda College in Rome, where he completed his theological studies. Prior to commencing this study of theology, he received a Doctorate in Philosophy. This degree was rarely mentioned in his later life. He was ordained a priest on 2 June 1917, at the Basilica of St John Lateran, by Cardinal Pompili.

== Positions ==
After his ordination, he was appointed to the position of Assistant Priest of Hawker, South Australia, where he stayed for a little over a year. He then moved to Jamestown, where he became the Curate for ten years. He stayed at Jamestown for nine more years, but as priest. While in Jamestown, he received many diocesan positions. In 1924, he was appointed as the Chancellor of the Diocese. Then, in 1929, a Diocesesan Consultor. Finally, he took the position of Vicar-General in 1935. At the time he was appointed as a bishop, he was holding all these positions simultaneously. The process of becoming a bishop began when Joseph Wilfrid Dwyer, then Bishop of Wagga Wagga, asked Pope Pius XI to grant him the aid of an auxiliary bishop. On 20 May 1937, Henschke was appointed as the Auxiliary Bishop of Wagga Wagga and the Titular Bishop of Praenetus. His consecration took place at Saint Anacletus' Cathedral on 15 August 1937. The chief consecrating Prelate was the Most Rev. Dr Andrew Killian, Archbishop of Adelaide. He was assisted by Most Rev. N. T. Gilroy who had been bishop in his old diocese and had recently been appointed co-adjudicator of Sydney and the Bishop of Wilcannia-Forbes the Most Rev. Dr Fox who had been a companion of Henschke at school and the seminary. Three priests from the Diocese of Wagga, which the Bishop was headed to, were also at the ceremony. These were Dean Hartigan of Narrandera, also known as the poet John O'Brien, Dr Harper and Fr L. Hatswell. Upon his arrival in Wagga, Bishop Henschke was appointed the Parish Priest of Junee, as well as the Vicar-General of the diocese. Due to the ill health of Bishop Dwyer, Henschke did extensive travel around the diocese.

Catholic Church titles
Preceded by Joseph Wilfrid Dwyer	2nd Bishop of Wagga Wagga; 1939–1968	Succeeded by Francis Carroll
