= Elzear Torreggiani =

The Most Reverend Elzear Torreggiani O.F.M. Cap.
- Bishop of Diocese of Armidale
- Diocese: Armidale
- Installed: 25 March 1879
- Term ended: 28 January 1904
- Predecessor: Thomas Timothy O'Mahony
- Successor: Patrick Joseph O’Connor

Orders
- Ordination: 23 May 1853 at by Antonio Benedetto Antonucci
- Consecration: 25 March 1879 at Our Lady of Sorrows, Peckham by James Danell

Personal details
- Born: Aloysius Torreggiani; 28 May 1830 Porto Recanati, Marche, Italy
- Died: 28 January 1904 (aged 73) Armidale, New South Wales, Australia
- Buried: Armidale, New South Wales, Australia
- Denomination: Catholic Church
- Occupation: Catholic bishop

Elzear Torreggiani D.D., O.F.M. Cap., (28 May 1830 – 28 January 1904) was a Catholic Bishop of Armidale, New South Wales.

== Early life ==
Torregiani was born in Porto Recanati, Loreto district, Papal States, Italy, the youngest son of Vincenzo Antonio Torregiani and his wife Margarita Francesca. He was baptised "Aloysius" and was educated by the Jesuits in Loreto. He originally hoped to join the Jesuits but instead joined the Order of Friars Minor Capuchin at their Convento di Renacavata in Camerino, the motherhouse of the Order. He was professed on 20 October 1846 and received the name Elzear, named after a tertiary of the Franciscan Order who was a ruler, diplomat and military leader. He studied theology and philosophy in Ancona.

== Priesthood ==
On 23 May 1853, he was ordained a priest for the Order of Friars Minor Capuchin in Ancona by Archbishop Antonio Benedetto Antonucci.

He volunteered for the foreign missions and was sent to England, which came as a surprise to the young Capuchin. "I knew it must be the will of God, because there was none of my own in it," he said. He arrived in Peckham, London, in 1856, where the Capuchins had been invited two years prior. He was soon sent to assist in founding a friary at Pantasaph, North Wales, where he helped to begin missions in Flint, Mold and Holyhead. In 1860, he moved to the mission at Pontypool where he built a monastery and large school. In 1876, he returned to Peckham, where he became guardian of Peckham friary.

In 1877, the Diocese of Armidale became vacant following the resignation of Bishop Thomas Timothy O’Mahony who had become embroiled in the colonial church politics of the time. He was accused of intemperance and fathering a child, and while he was cleared of both allegations, resigned while in Rome and never returned to the Diocese. Archbishop Roger Vaughan OSB, keen to avoid another similar scandal, sought a replacement who would be neither English or Irish. Torreggiani had been known to Vaughan and he was likely instrumental in securing his appointment to the See of Armidale.

== Epsicopate ==
On 4 February 1879, Torreggiani was appointed Bishop of Armidale by Pope Leo XIII. He was consecrated bishop on 25 March 1879 at Our Lady of Sorrows, Peckham by Bishop James Danell. consecrated bishop on 25 March 1879.

After visiting Rome, he travelled to Australia and reached Sydney on 8 November 1879, accompanied by five Capuchin priests. After briefly visiting Bishop Vaughan, he made his way north to Armidale, arriving in the city on 26 November 1879.

When he took charge of the Diocese, it encompassed the towns of Armidale, Glen Innes, Inverell, Emmaville, Tenterfield, Bundarra, Bingara, Narrabri, Uralla, Grafton, Rocky Mouth, Palmers Island, Lismore, Casino, West Kempsey, Smithtown, and Boat Harbour. It had 10,000 Catholics served by 17 priests and two schools.

On Christmas Day 1883, he survived an assassination attempt when a "madman" with a loaded revolver walked into the Cathedral during the celebration of Mass and fired at the prelate.

Over the course of his episcopate, he established many convents, schools and churches. He had a great zeal and devotion to the cause of religion, education and charity. Torreggiani has worked closely with the Ursulines in Peckham and promptly invited them to establish themselves in Armidale following his election. He established a convent for the Sisters of St Joseph of the Sacred Heart in Tenterfield and invited the Sisters of Mercy to begin schools in the region. Despite the Diocese of Grafton being carved from the Diocese of Armidale in 1887, by 1904, Armidale had 19 priests, 17 schools and many new buildings owned by the Church.

In 1902, Torreggiani began to experience a decline in his health and had been confined to bed at one point. He sent a request to the Holy See asking for a Coadjutor bishop to be appointed. His Vicar General, Patrick O'Connor, was unanimously nominated by the priests of the Diocese of Armidale for the role. On 12 January 1903, the request was granted and O'Connor was appointed Coadjutor Bishop of Armidale.

== Death ==
Throughout 1903, Torreggiani's health began to decline. He celebrated the golden jubilee of his priesthood in June, however by November, he had become seriously indisposed. In early December there had been some hope of his recovery but by later December, he was seriously ill again.

On 28 January 1904, he died of pulmonary thrombosis and heart disease. His body was taken to St Mary's Cathedral, Armidale where a requiem Mass was celebrated. He was dedicated to a life of poverty and on his death, his debts exceeded his assets by £130.

== See also ==
- Catholic Church in Australia
