= Diocese of Armidale =

Diocese of Armidale could refer to:

- Anglican Diocese of Armidale
- Roman Catholic Diocese of Armidale
