= O'Connor Catholic College =

Location
- Armidale, New South Wales; Australia; 30°30′44″S 151°40′47″E

Information
- Former names: St Ursula’s College; De La Salle College; O'Connor Catholic High School
- Type: Independent co-educational secondary day school
- Motto: The Fruit of the Spirit is Love
- Denomination: Roman Catholic
- Established: 1882 (as St Ursula's College); 1906 (as De La Salle College); 1975; 51 years ago (as O'Connor Catholic High School)
- Oversight: Roman Catholic Diocese of Armidale
- Enrollment: 507 (2022)

O'Connor Catholic College, formerly O'Connor Catholic High School, is an independent Catholic co-educational secondary day school, located in Armidale, New South Wales, Australia. It was created by an amalgamation of St Ursula's College and De La Salle College. Administered by the Diocese of Armidale, O’Connor College occupies the site of the former De La Salle College and has, as its motto, a quote from St Paul's Letter to the Galatians, "The Fruit of the Spirit is Love".

== History ==
The college was formed in 1975 with the amalgamation of two of Armidale's longest-established schools – St Ursula's College (established in 1882 by Sister Mary Cordula) and De La Salle College (established in 1906).

The college takes its name from Patrick O'Connor, Bishop of Armidale from 1904 to 1930, who contributed greatly to Catholic education in the diocese during that time.

=== Controversy ===
In 2024, a counsellor at the school during the 1970s and 1980s, Allan Keith Huggins, was given a custodial sentence of 28 years for sexual abuse offences against teenage and pre-teenage boys.

== Notable alumni ==
- Lyall Munro Jnr, from the Aboriginal mission at Moree, attended De la Salle College in 1966 when, at the age of 14, he attained his instructor's badge in lifesaving.

== See also ==
- List of Catholic schools in New South Wales
- Catholic education in Australia
