= Timothy O'Mahony =

Irish-Australian Catholic bishop (1825–1892

The Most Reverend Timothy O'Mahony
- Bishop Emeritus of Armidale
- Diocese: Armidale
- Installed: 30 November 1869
- Term ended: 2 August 1877
- Other posts: Titular Bishop of Eudocias (1879–1892), Auxiliary Bishop of Toronto (1879–1892)

Orders
- Ordination: 25 March 1849 at Rome
- Consecration: 30 November 1869 at Cathedral of St Mary and St Anne, Cork, Ireland by William Delany

Personal details
- Born: Thomas Timothy O’Mahony; 30 November 1825 Aherla, County Cork, Ireland
- Died: 8 September 1892 (aged 66) Toronto, Ontario, Canada
- Buried: St. Paul's Basilica, Ontario, Canada
- Denomination: Catholic Church
- Occupation: Catholic bishop
- Education: Pontifical Irish College

Thomas Timothy O’Mahony (30 November 1825 – 8 September 1892) was an Irish bishop of the Catholic Church. He was the first Bishop of Armidale, in Australia, and later served as Auxiliary Bishop of Toronto, in Canada.

== Early life ==
O'Mahony was born in Cork County, Ireland. He began his clerical studies in Cork and completed them at the Pontifical Irish College in Rome. He was educated alongside his cousins James Quinn and Matthew Quinn, who would also become bishops in Australia.

== Priesthood ==
O'Mahony was ordained a priest for the Diocese of Cork on 25 March 1849. He was well travelled as a priest, visiting Austria, the Netherlands, Dresden and Saxony while serving as a priest. In 1869, he was parish priest of St Finbarr's Parish, Cork.

== Episcopate ==
O'Mahony was appointed the first Bishop of Armidale on 1 October 1869, ending a seven-year period of having no permanent bishop since the Diocese' erection on 28 November 1862. He was consecrated on 30 November 1869 in the Cathedral of St Mary and St Anne, Cork, by Bishop William Delany. He left Ireland for Australia in late 1870.

Shortly after arriving in Australia, O'Mahony became caught up in colonial church politics. He signed signed with his fellow Irish suffragans in 1873 a post-factum objection to Roger Vaughan as Archbishop John Bede Polding's co-adjutor. At a similar time, O'Mahony was accused of intemperance and fathering a child. Both charges were set to the Propaganda Fide and the scandal came to national attention. While the charge of fathering a child was withdrawn and a priest who blackmailed him identified, accusations of him being a perpetual drunkard remained.

Vaughan was told by Rome to investigate the charges while Bishop James Quinn, fearing a bias against Irish bishops, sent a priest to Armidale to get evidence to clear O'Mahony. While Quinn believed he had found evidence of a conspiracy to get O'Mahony to compromise himself, Rome accepted a report from Vaughan in 1875 which recommended O'Mahony resign despite the main charge against him being unproven. O'Mahony was called to Rome in 1875 and it appears he stayed with Quinn for some months before embarking to the Eternal City.

By early January 1877, O'Mahony had been vindicated from all charges in the public's view. However, on 2 August 1877, while in Europe, he resigned as Bishop of Armidale. Vaughan was appointed as administrator of the diocese.

After residing in Rome for some years and becoming acquainted with Archbishop John Lynch of Toronto, he was appointed as an auxiliary bishop of the Archdiocese of Toronto on 14 November 1879.

Upon arriving in Toronto, he was given charge of St Paul's Church. Desiring to make the building more suitable for the congregation, he began a weekly collection for a new building. The new building was completed in 1889 and it was dedicated on 22 December 1889. The church was designated a minor basilica by Pope John Paul II in 1999.

== Death ==
O'Mahony died following a long and painful illness on 8 September 1892. He is buried in St. Paul's Basilica, the church he helped to construct.

Catholic Church titles
Preceded by –	Bishop of Armidale; 1869–1877	Succeeded by Elzear Torreggiani
Preceded by –	Titular Bishop of Eudocias; 1879–1892	Succeeded by Emile Pourbaix
Preceded by –	Auxiliary Bishop of Toronto; 1955–1965	Succeeded by –
