= Ag Críost an Síol =

Irish poem and later a hymn

"Ag Críost an Síol" (Irish: [ə ˈcɾʲiːsˠt̪ˠ ə ˈʃiːlˠ]; meaning "Christ's is the seed") is an Irish poem, later set to music by Seán Ó Riada and subsequently widely used as a hymn.

== Origins ==
There are conflicting accounts of the origins of Ag Críost an Síol.

Some sources describe the poem as "traditional" or "an old anonymous prayer".

Another source says that it was in fact written in 1916 by Father Michael Sheehan (Micheál Ó Síocháin) of Waterford, a co-founder of Coláiste na Rinne, the Irish College in An Rinn, County Waterford, who later became assistant Archbishop of Sydney, Australia.

A third source, published within the lifetime of Fr. Sheehan, credits the words to the similarly named Fr. Michael Meehan (Micheál Ó Míocháin) (1810-1878), long time Parish Priest of the parishes of Moyarta and Kilballyowen in County Clare.

The words were set to music by Seán Ó Riada as the offertory hymn in his 1968 setting of the mass, Ceol an Aifrinn (literally, "Music of the Mass"; known in English as the "Ó Riada Mass"), which is used to close a number of Irish traditional music gatherings, such as summer schools.

== Text ==
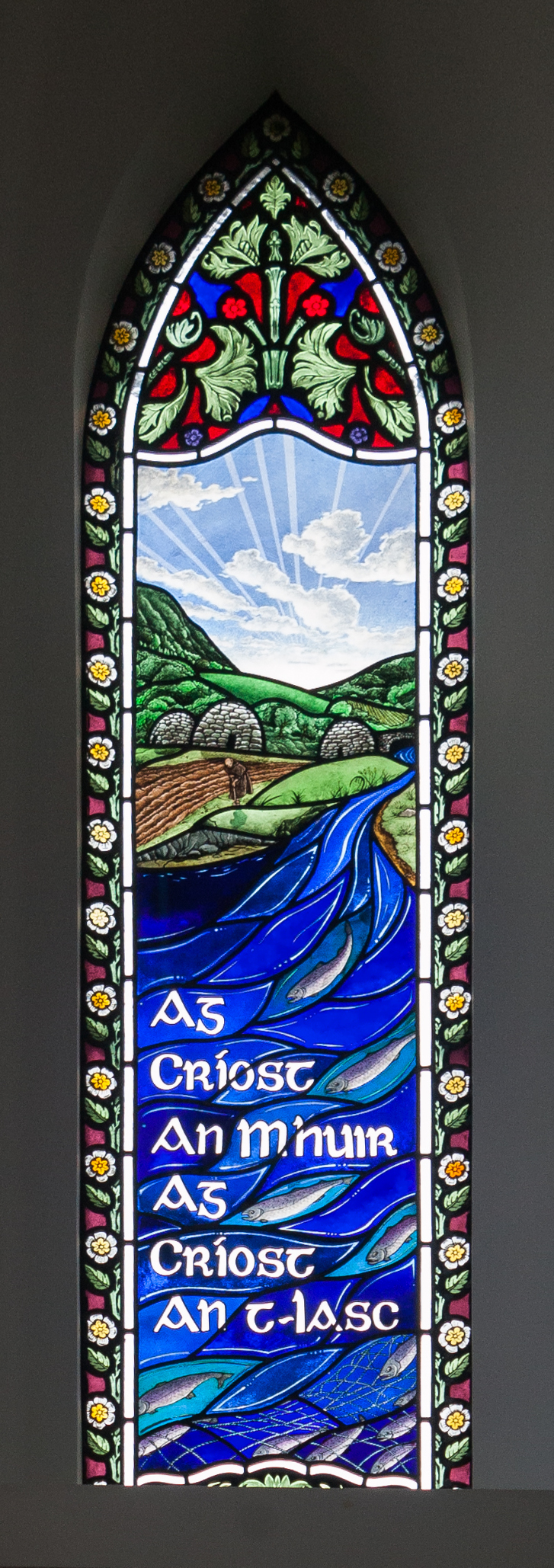
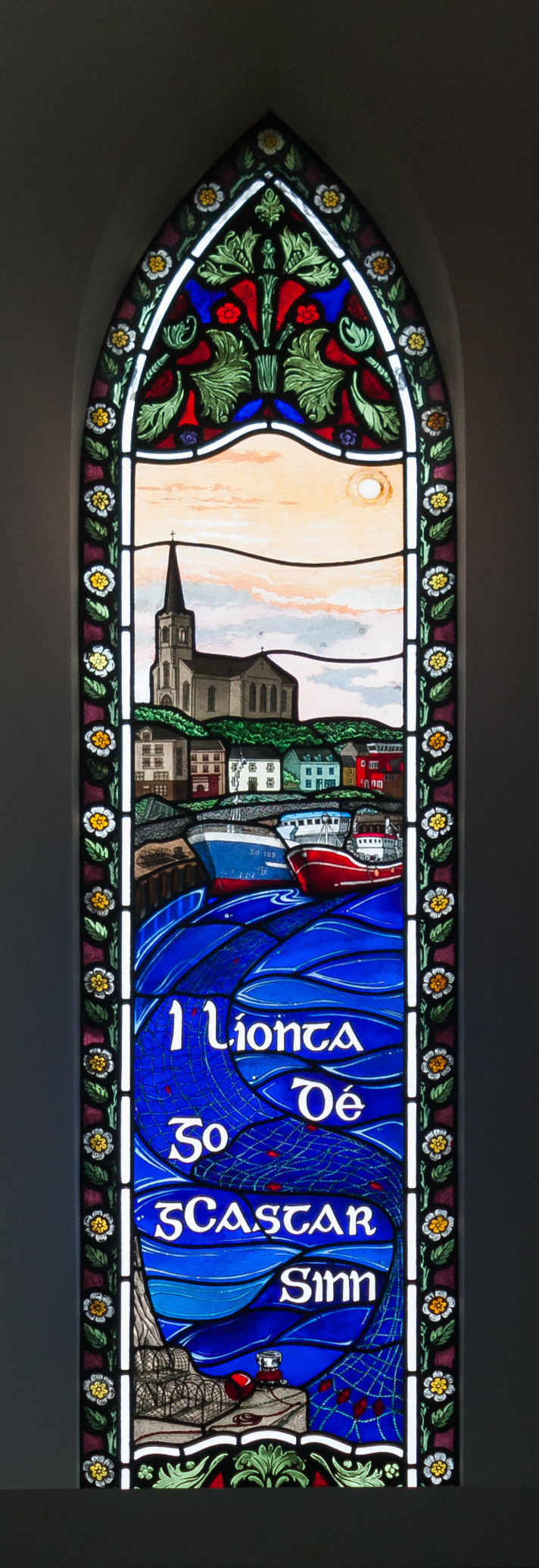
Stained glass windows in St. Mary of the Visitation Church, Killybegs

=== Irish text ===
Ag Críost an síol, ag Críost an fómhar;
in iothlainn Dé go dtugtar sinn.
Ag Críost an mhuir, ag Críost an t-iasc;
i líonta Dé go gcastar sinn.

Ó fhás go h-aois, is ó aois go bás,
do dhá láimh, a Chríost, anall tharainn.
Ó bhás go críoch, ní críoch ach athfhás,
i bParthas na ngrás go rabhaimid.

=== English translation ===
Christ's is the seed, Christ's is the crop,
in the rickyard of God may we be brought.
Christ's is the sea, Christ's is the fish,
in the nets of God may we be caught.

From growth to age, from age to death,
Thy two arms, O Christ, about us.
From death to end, not end but rebirth,
in blessed Paradise may we be.
