= Saints Mary and Joseph Catholic Cathedral =

Catholic cathedral in New South Wales, Australia

- Cathedral of Saint Mary and Saint Joseph
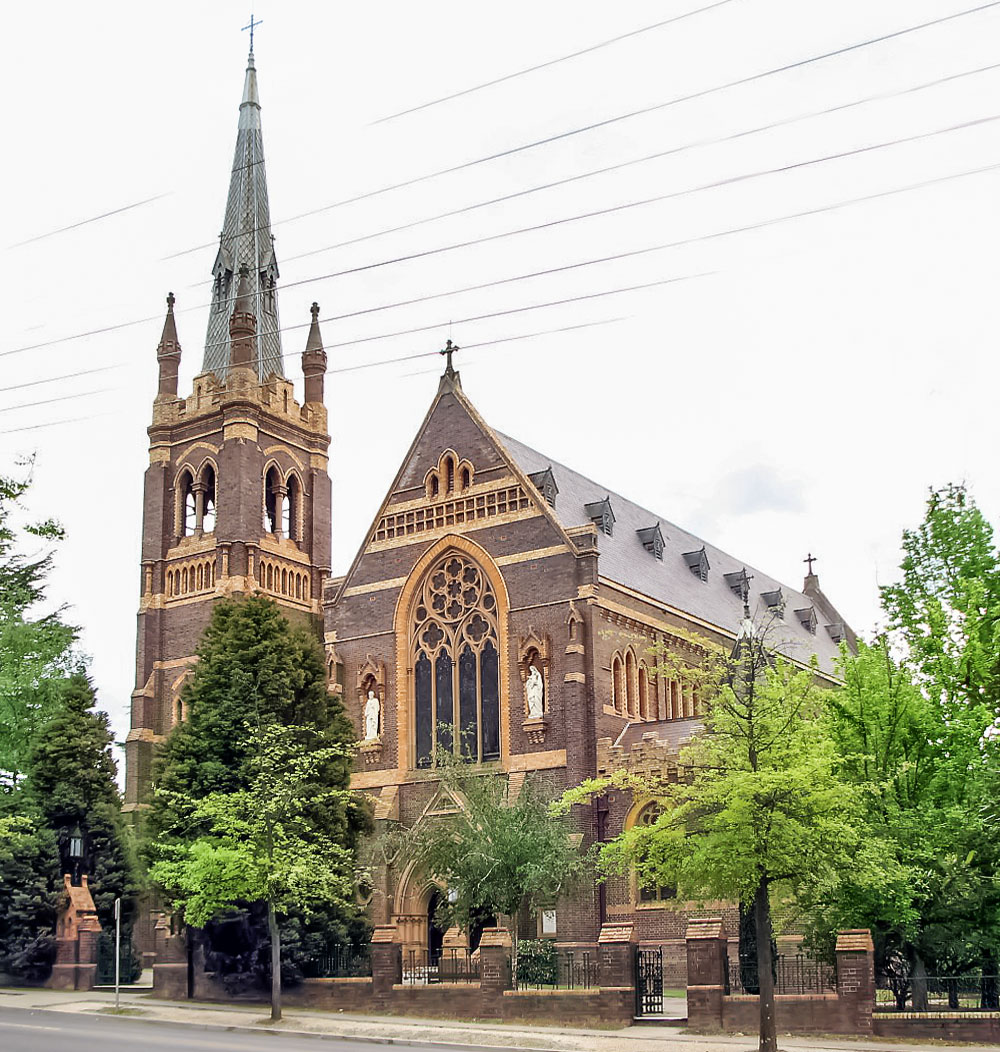
- Saints Mary and Joseph Catholic Cathedral, pictured in 2006

- Location in New South Wales
- 30°30′57″S 151°39′49″E
- Location: 132 Dangar Street, Armidale, Armidale Regional Council, New South Wales
- Country: Australia
- Denomination: Catholic Church
- Sui iuris church: Latin Church
- Website: smjcathedral.org.au

History
- Status: Cathedral
- Dedication: Saint Mary; Saint Joseph
- Consecrated: 12 December 1919; 106 years ago

Architecture
- Functional status: Active
- Architect(s): John Hennessy (of Sheerin and Hennessy)
- Architectural type: Federation Gothic Revival
- Years built: 1911–1912; 114 years ago

Specifications
- Materials: Pyrmont stone; Australian red cedar; Welsh slate; Armidale polychrome brick

Administration
- Diocese: Armidale

Clergy
- Bishop(s): Most Rev. Peter Mel Murphy, DTh
- Priests: Rev. Fr Paul Chandler Ph D; Rev. Fr. Elino Comanda OSJ

New South Wales Heritage Register
- Official name: St Mary & St Joseph Catholic Cathedral Group; St. Mary & St. Joseph; Saint Mary & Saint Joseph
- Type: State heritage (built)
- Designated: 13 February 2015
- Reference no.: 1925
- Type: Cathedral
- Category: Religion
- Builders: George Frederick Nott

Saints Mary and Joseph Catholic Cathedral is a heritage-listed cathedral at 132 Dangar Street, Armidale, Armidale Regional Council, New South Wales, Australia. It is the diocesan cathedral of the Roman Catholic Diocese of Armidale and the seat of the Catholic Bishop of Armidale. The cathedral was designed by John Hennessy of Sheerin and Hennessy, and built from 1911 to 1912 by George Frederick Nott. It is also known as the St Mary & St Joseph Catholic Cathedral and the Cathedral of Saint Mary and Saint Joseph. It was added to the New South Wales State Heritage Register on 13 February 2015.

== History ==
Religion and the establishment of places of worship have played an important role in the colonial expansion and settlement of NSW. As the boundaries of the colony expanded and settlers pushed into previously unestablished areas, the government ensured religion followed to cater for the spiritual education and morality of the settlers.

As for the Northern Tablelands region, European settlement came as early as 1832 as pastoralists searched beyond the colonial boundaries for new land on which to run their stock. At this time, the early settlers of the district were in fact illegal squatters who only gained colonial approval to work the land in 1836 with the passing of legislation recognizing the pastoralist's rights to graze (but not own) the land (for an annual fee of ten pounds). Caroline Chisholm, known as the immigrants' friend, arrived in Sydney in 1838.

Religion soon followed the pastoralists into the newly declared township of Armidale (established in the late 1840s). A townsite was surveyed in 1848 and gazetted in 1849. The town benefited from being situated on the Great Northern Road with Cobb and Co establishing a service in 1850. The following year the population was recorded at 547. The first recorded Catholic service was conducted in Armidale in 1848 by a travelling priest in a newly constructed Catholic chapel. The first parish church building was on the same location as the current O'Connor Catholic College. The first resident priest, however, was not to arrive in the parish until 1853. Father Timothy McCarthy was to lead the parish until 1862 when the Catholic Diocese of Armidale was formally established.

The Most Reverend Timothy O'Mahony, familiar with fundraising for the missions, was appointed as the first bishop for the Armidale Diocese, being consecrated on 30 November 1869, in St Finbar's Cork by Bishop William Delany of Cork. He then attended the First Vatican Council and was not to arrive in Armidale until 1871. He served as the bishop of Armidale for 7–8 years but was forced to resign after probably false allegations of misbehaviour. He served the remainder of his career as a bishop in Toronto Canada. In the meantime and under the bishop's instruction, the veteran pioneering parish priest Dean John Thomas Lynch and first administrator of the Armidale Diocese was responsible for the construction of the diocese' first cathedral. After receiving the Abstinence Pledge from many & laying foundation stones at places such as Maitland, Grafton & Tenterfield to name a few, Dean Lynch officiated at the laying of the foundation stone in Armidale on 8 December 1870. The Armidale Express reported the occasion and provided a photographer. 1870 was the centenary of the discovery of Australia by Captain Cook and the same year that Thunderbolt was apprehended at Kentucky Creek. Built on the same site as the present cathedral at the corner of Dangar St and Barney St, the brick, stone and shingle cathedral was opened and dedicated in 1872 as the principal church of the Catholic Diocese of Armidale. Growth was quick due to mission donations from Europe and the opportunities of this region. There is a later 1912 historic photo of the new and old cathedrals standing side by side – illustrating the wisdom of the buildings project managers. Parts of the first cathedral were recycled to the Bundarra Catholic church & to the nearby St Mary's primary school. Dean Lynch was well known in Maitland and Taree parishes prior to his duties in Armidale. Dean Lynch was one of the original "Men of '38". In Maitland and in Armidale, "the Dean" collaborated with The Patriarch of Armidale, "Joseph Daly" and his wife Mary. The couple were married in Ireland prior to migrating to New South Wales. In Armidale they were initially based as overseer at Tilbuster station & they raised an Armidale-based family. The Daly family donated the land the cathedral is presently built upon. Mary Daly died in the same year the foundation stone was laid, namely 1870. Their last resting place is in the Old Catholic cemetery at Armidale about 50 meters south of Lynches Rd Armidale, named after their good friend Dean Lynch. Dean Lynch, Monsignor Lynch by then, later worked from St Bedes Parish Church Pyrmont and a chapter was dedicated to "The Dean" in the 2017 publication for the sesquicentenary of that historic Pyrmont parish. As a passing note, the sandstone pointed arches at the entrance and the internal sandstone pillars of the cathedral are known as Pyrmont Sandstone. The last resting places of all of the "Men of '38" are side by side at Rookwood Cemetery Sydney. This continues a long established Sydney – Armidale interdependent link between the first convict built great northern road to Maitland, the later steamship access via Taree and Grafton and the later Great Northern Railway line. The Armidale Diocese is described as a suffragan diocese of the Sydney Archdiocese.

In 1882 Brother Gatti from the Catholic Church volunteered to landscape Central Park opposite the cathedral together with the original Catholic Church grounds, the Convent grounds and the Catholic section of the Armidale cemetery. These plantings included Mediterranean cypresses (Cupressus sempervirens) and Himalayan cedars (Cedrus deodara). The cypresses in Central Park were planted c. 1902. The two Italian cypresses in the cathedral grounds may have been planted not long after demolition of the original 1870 built brick cathedral in 1912 and may demonstrate an association with the life and work of Brother Gatti, who was a keen horticulturist. The diameter of the base of the trunks of the cypresses in the church grounds is comparable with most of those planted in Central Park indicating that they may have planted within 10–20 years of one another. The Cedar planted more or less at the entrance of the first Cathedral was planted in the 1970s and is either an Atlas Cedar or a Cedar of Lebanon – both originating in the mountains of the eastern Mediterranean. These cedars have been famous throughout history and if left to run their natural course can live for 2000 years. Armidale Regional Council has placed a label on all of the tall trees in Central Park providing both the common and scientific names & throughout Armidale there are about 200 established Atlas Cedars.

The first catholic cathedral in Armidale was to serve the religious needs of the growing community for some 40 years but it inevitably became too small for the expanding congregation. Considered to be beyond any structural alteration or enlargement, plans were soon underway for the construction of a larger and more resplendent cathedral to become the new seat for the Bishop of the Catholic Diocese of Armidale.

Under Bishop Patrick O'Connor, the contract for the design of the new cathedral was awarded to Sheerin and Hennessy, a Sydney-based firm previously responsible for a number of Catholic buildings in NSW, with John Hennessy as principal architect. The builder engaged for the project was the prominent local contractor, George Frederick Nott, who, although a practising Anglican, was one of a number of local residents who contributed generously to the project.

In fact, the widespread support for the cathedral saw the construction complete and the cathedral opened within a mere 20 months after the laying of the foundation stone in February 1911. Opened in October 1912, the quick construction of the cathedral was a considerable achievement and was "a great tribute to the faith and generosity of the people". The generosity of the congregation and community was so great that St Mary and St Joseph Catholic Cathedral was the first Australian cathedral opened free of debt – the A£28,000 cost paid entirely by pledges and donations.

Although the original cathedral had remained next to its replacement during its construction, it was dismantled in 1912 and much of its material retained and reused later in the construction of the St Mary's Primary School and Cathedral Hall. A remnant of the original cathedral can also be seen in the plinth supporting the statue of St Peter overlooking the grave site of Bishop Edward Doody (appointed bishop, 1948–68). A further remnant of cathedral artefacts from these times is a finely painted timber reredos used until replaced by the 1919 Italian marble rererdos. The painting was done by Elizabeth Statter. Elizabeth studied at Oxford University prior to meeting the Capuchins destined for NSW and carried out diocesan duties in those pioneering days which would have included liaising with the now St Mary MacKillop. Elizabeth Statter's last resting place is 2 meters south of that of Bishop Elzear Torreggiani.

Formally opened in the year of 1912 (although not consecrated until the Golden Jubilee year of 1919 co-inciding with the installation of the reputedly finest Italian sourced marble reredos in Australia & the attendance in Armidale of the Apostolic Delegate to Pope Benedict XV, Dr O'Connor writes about the occasion in the Freemans Journal of 21 Aug 1919), the cathedral was dedicated to the memory and legacy of Bishop Elzear Torreggiani, who served the faithful of this diocese for 25 years, from 1879 to 1904. This dedication is seen at the base of the great eastern window from the inside of the present cathedral. Bishop Torreggiani was dedicated to building communities and establishing a number of schools and parish churches in the diocese at a time when funding education was often troublesome. (In December 2019, after some two weeks of closure & minor renovations to the cathedral and temporary relocation of the liturgies to the St Mary of the Angels Chapel on Barney Street, the faithful of the Armidale Diocese celebrated the centenary of these events led by the current bishop Robert Kennedy, the new Dean Roel Llave and accompanied by appropriate musicianship.) A record of the occasion may be found in the February 2020 Viewpoint magazine. With his fellow capuchins the provision of pastoral care had a distinctly gentle franciscan nuance and to this day, Francis is a popular local boy's name. Until 1882, funding for secular and denominational schools was administered by the government but funding for denominational schools was to cease following the passing of the Public Institutions Act of 1880. Although a substantial impost on the diocese, Bishop Torreggiani was committed to continuing schools at the direct expense of the diocese. A good number of foundations were made by St Mary Mackillop in the Armidale diocese during the administration of Bishop Torregiani. Bishop Torreggiani's last resting place is in the Old Catholic Cemetery in Armidale beside a good number of fellow veteran Capuchin missionaries who travelled with him to New South Wales shortly after he was chosen by Pope Leo XIII to be ordained in London as the Bishop of Armidale.

=== Ursuline Sisters ===
In order to achieve this, the bishop sought to appoint Catholic nuns who, having vowed to a life of poverty, could establish and operate educational facilities for the children of the district. During the 1880s, the bishop attracted several teaching orders including a group of Ursuline sisters who, having been expelled from their convent in Duderstadt, Germany in 1877, had settled in Greenwich, London. In bringing the Ursuline sisters to Armidale, the diocese secured their permanent home by purchasing an 1860 house (to be named Merici House after the founding member of the order, St Angela Merici) to be used as the convent. The diocese would also pay the passage of 12 sisters from London to Armidale. The sisters arrived in 1882 and soon opened the High School for Young Ladies as well as operating the existing parish school in Dangar Street.

The sisters were an experienced order with an established educational philosophy. "For them, education was total, embracing all the years of a child's life from about seven to 17" and catered for students of all ages and educational standard. The sisters focussed on instilling refinement in their pupils and teaching the necessary skills required for a well-educated lady (namely music, art and needlework). The widespread success and popularity of the Ursuline convent saw the construction of St Ursula's College in 1888, the convent chapel in 1928 and a new presbytery in 1938. St Ursula's School closed in 1975 and was converted into the O'Connor Catholic High School and, although education continues, the Ursuline Sisters finally left the convent in 2011 after some 130 years of service to the Catholic community of Armidale. Angela Merici was a member of the third order of St Francis. Some history of the Australian Ursulines is available at http://www.australianursulines.org.au/our-story/history along with a photo of them welcoming Lady Stonehaven in 1929, the wife of the governor general of Australia. The last resting place of a good number of these Armidale based Ursuline Nuns, who are also referred to as the founding mothers of the Ursuline foundations in Australia, is 20 meters south of the last resting place of Bishop Torregiani, in the old catholic portion of the Armidale Cemetery.

=== Modifications and dates ===
==== Cathedral ====
- 1919 – high altar added (replaced timber pulpit from original cathedral)
- 1946–47 – lead material in roof replaced
- 1947 – marble reredos added
- 1961 – mosaic added to quatrefoil and tympanum of eastern doorway
- 1972 – tower reinforced
- 1970s/80s – restoration and maintenance
- 1979 – modifications to entry foyer, narthex, airlock screen and confessionals; glass doors added to western entrance; and external paving, waterproofing and repainting of western wall
- 1985 – restoration of organ
- 1990s – restoration of stained glass windows
- 1996 – damage repairs to roof and some windows (following hail storm)
- 2013 – following the installation in 2012 of the 10th bishop of Armidale, a number of renovations including a double story car park – updating the precinct took place.
- 2019 – the main reredos was cleaned to celebrate the centenary of the cathedral's dedication. (See 1919 ref above.)
- 2021 – 25 March 2021 saw sesquicentenary celebrations of the installation of the first Bishop of Armidale, Timothy O'Mahony by Archbishop John Bede Polding. A memorial stone was blessed and installed during 2021.

==== Ursuline Convent ====
- 1900 – extended with new wing
- 1922 – verandah and bay windows added
- 1930 – 9 February the new chapel opened by Bishop O'Connor. Some details at https://www.ohta.org.au/organs/organs/ArmidaleConvent.html

==== St Ursula's College ====
- 1939 – additions including new classroom, recreation hall, music practise rooms, bedrooms and bathroom block
- 1951 – domestic science school and industrial laundry

== Description ==
Built in 1912 in the Federation Gothic Revival style, St Mary & St Joseph Catholic Cathedral is a main feature in the Armidale townscape. Constructed of Armidale Blue brickwork with a lighter decorative brick trim, the cathedral has a slate roof with tall needle spire (47m) above a castellated bell tower. The cathedral has large stained glass windows, a marble sanctuary, chancel arch, eastern facade, and Flemish bond work. The cedar pews and internal joinery were constructed using timber from local builder GF Nott's sawmill. In the body of the cathedral, there is an Australian red cedar double hammer beam truss ceiling. The entrance of Pyrmont Stone dressings and the 14 internal columns, which sustain the roof, are made from Sydney Pyrmont Sandstone. Above the main entrance is a Roman-style mosaic, which was installed by Bishop Doody to memorialise the 50th anniversary of the laying of the 1911 foundation stone.

The historic Catholic cathedral group also includes the St Ursuline Convent, Ursuline Chapel, Bishops House, former St Ursula's College, Catholic Schools Administration Building and surrounding landscaping and fencing.

It was reported to be in very good condition upon an inspection on 18 April 2013. Some buildings in the cathedral precinct were reported to be unused as of May 2013, but a masterplan for the site was under development at that time.

== Heritage listing ==
The St Mary and St Joseph Catholic Cathedral Group is of state heritage significance as the landmark Catholic cathedral for the regional colonial centre of Armidale. On the site of the first Catholic cathedral (1848), the cathedral was constructed in 1911–12 to serve the religious needs of the growing community and to serve as the centre for the Catholic Diocese of Armidale (formed in 1869, this was one of the first dioceses to be established outside of the colonial settlements of Sydney and Newcastle). Today, the cathedral continues to be the centre of the Catholic Diocese of Armidale.

The cathedral group is also of state heritage significance as the centre of the first order of the Ursuline Sisters (who settled in Armidale in 1882) and for its association with the prominent architectural firm, Sheerin and Hennessy. Sited in a landmark position in the Armidale township, the cathedral is a finely detailed and decorated building that, upon its completion, was considered to be the finest Catholic cathedral in Australia.

This Federation Gothic Revival regional cathedral and its precinct is also significant as it demonstrates the religious requirements of the district and holds ongoing social significance for the community and Catholic congregation of Armidale and the wider Northern Tablelands district.

St Mary & St Joseph Catholic Cathedral was listed on the New South Wales State Heritage Register on 13 February 2015 having satisfied the following criteria.

The place is important in demonstrating the course, or pattern, of cultural or natural history in New South Wales.

The St Mary and St Joseph Catholic Cathedral Group is of state heritage significance as the landmark Catholic cathedral for the regional colonial centre of Armidale. On the site of the first Catholic cathedral (1848), the cathedral was constructed in 1911–12 to serve the religious needs of the growing community and to serve as the centre for the Catholic Diocese of Armidale. The diocese had formed in 1869 and was one of the first to be established outside of the colonial settlements of Sydney and Newcastle.

Due to the considerable public support for the construction of the cathedral (from both Catholic and non-Catholic residents of the Northern Tablelands district), the cathedral was constructed in a mere 20 months and was the first cathedral in Australia to open entirely debt free due to the generous donations and pledges of the community.

The place has a strong or special association with a person, or group of persons, of importance of cultural or natural history of New South Wales's history.

The St Mary and St Joseph Catholic Cathedral Group is of state heritage significance for its association with the prominent architectural firm, Sheerin and Hennessy. Joseph Sheerin and Jack Hennessy were architects of considerable stature in NSW at the time and had previously been responsible for the design of a number of Catholic and public buildings throughout the state. During the construction, Jack Hennessy was the president of the Institute of Architects NSW as well as the principal architect on Armidale's Catholic cathedral.

The Catholic cathedral group also has a significant association with the Ursuline Sisters, a group of nuns who arrived in Armidale in 1882 to lead the Catholic education of the children of the district. In the late 19th century, religion and church institutions played a significant role in the development and operation of educational establishments in regional NSW.

The place is important in demonstrating aesthetic characteristics and/or a high degree of creative or technical achievement in New South Wales.

The St Mary and St Joseph Catholic Cathedral Group is of state heritage significance for its aesthetic value.

Designed by prominent ecclesiastical architectural firm, Sherrin and Hennessy, the Gothic Revival cathedral is a grand landmark in the Armidale townscape and, as the formal seat for the bishop of the Catholic Diocese of Armidale, the cathedral is a dominant building in the region.

A finely detailed and decorated building, the cathedral dates from the key period of the development of Armidale as a regional city and, with its 47m tall needle spire, was considered to be the finest Catholic cathedral in Australia upon its opening in 1912. In a commanding position overlooking Armidale's central park, the St Mary and St Joseph Catholic Cathedral Group is a landmark in the district and the diocese.

The St Mary and St Joseph Catholic Cathedral is complemented by a precinct of religious buildings, including the St Ursuline Convent, Ursuline Chapel, Bishops House, former St Ursula's College and Catholic Schools Administration Building. This precinct of religious buildings use the same construction materials and reflect the architectural nature (albeit simplified) as the cathedral building.

The place has strong or special association with a particular community or cultural group in New South Wales for social, cultural or spiritual reasons.

The St Mary and St Joseph Catholic Cathedral Group is of state heritage significance for its social value to the community and congregation of Armidale and the wider Northern Tablelands district.

From its settlement in the 1830s, Armidale was regarded in the colony as a suitable centre for the provision of religious services to the expanding and wide-reaching population. Once built, the cathedral became the centre of the Catholic Diocese of Armidale (one of the first dioceses to be established outside of the colonial settlements of Sydney and Newcastle in 1869).

The construction of the cathedral in a mere 20 months, due entirely to the considerable public support and generosity of both Catholic and non-Catholic residents of the district, reflects the value this site has to its community.

The central position of the cathedral in the Armidale township, in conjunction with the adjacent Anglican Cathedral Church of St Peter Apostle and Martyr and St Pauls Presbyterian Church, forms a landmark religious precinct that has significance and value to the community.

The place has potential to yield information that will contribute to an understanding of the cultural or natural history of New South Wales.

Sited on a previously undeveloped portion of land, there is potential for further investigation of the cathedral site to reveal evidence of Aboriginal occupation of the Armidale region prior to the arrival of European settlers in the 1830s.

This potential for investigation would be relevant across the Armidale district.

The place possesses uncommon, rare or endangered aspects of the cultural or natural history of New South Wales.

Although the St Mary and St Joseph Catholic Cathedral Group may not be a rare example of its type in NSW, it is a prominent landmark building in the Armidale townscape and religious precinct.

The place is important in demonstrating the principal characteristics of a class of cultural or natural places/environments in New South Wales.

The St Mary and St Joseph Catholic Cathedral Group is of state heritage significance as a representative example of a grand and ornate Federation Gothic Revival regional cathedral and religious precinct. Positioned around the cathedral (that was considered to be the finest in Australia upon construction), the Catholic precinct reflects the religious requirements of the broad congregation and community it serves. The development of educational institutions is typical of religious organisations in the late 19th century.

== See also ==
- Roman Catholicism in Australia
