= Bridget Partridge =

Australian religious sister (1890–1966)

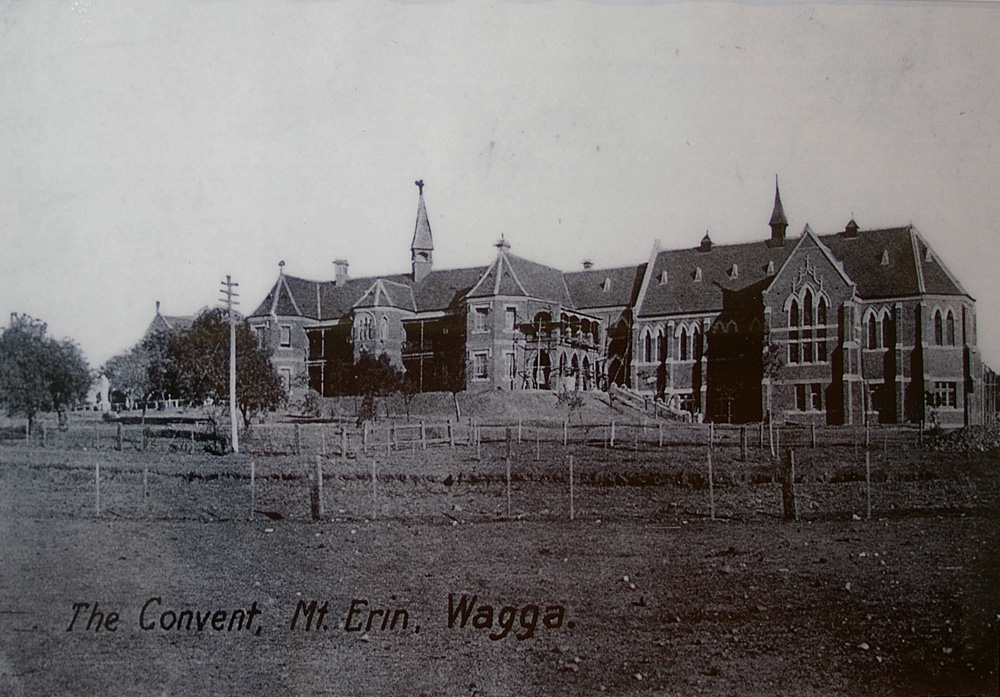
- Mount Erin Convent

Personal life
- Born: Bridget Mary Partridge; 21 October 1890 Newbridge, Kildare, Ireland
- Died: 4 December 1966 (aged 76) Rydalmere, Sydney, New South Wales, Australia
- Parents: Edward Partridge (father); Anne Partridge (née Cardiff) (mother)

Religious life
- Religion: Christianity
- Denomination: Roman Catholic
- Order: Presentation Sister

Bridget Mary Partridge (21 October 1890 – 4 December 1966), also known as Sister Mary Liguori, was an Irish-born Australian Roman Catholic religious sister who on the night of 24 July 1920 fled the Presentation Convent in Wagga Wagga dressed only in her nightgown. This act became a national sectarian scandal after the young nun took refuge with Protestants. Partridge was accused of being a lunatic by the local Catholic bishop, whom she subsequently sued in the New South Wales Supreme Court in 1921 for false arrest and reputational damage.

== Early life and education ==
Partridge was born on 21 October 1890 in Newbridge, Kildare, Ireland. Sources vary and refer to her as both Brigid and Bridget. Her mother was Anne (née Cardiff), an Irish Catholic, and her father was Edward Partridge, a corporal in the Royal Engineers and an English Protestant.

Partridge completed her schooling at the age of 14. In 1908, when she was 18, she entered the Order of the Presentation of the Blessed Virgin Mary at St Bridget's Convent in Kildare. Shortly afterwards, on 25 December 1908, she set sail for Melbourne, Victoria, Australia. She became a novice with the Presentation Sisters on 21 February 1909, living at the order's mother house, Mount Erin, in Wagga Wagga, New South Wales. When she was professed on 25 September 1911, she took the religious name of Mary Liguori, after 18th-century Bishop Alphonsus Liguori, who was the patron saint of confessors. She taught at a convent at Ganmain for around five years before coming back to the mother house in 1918.

== Sectarian controversy ==
Sources indicate that her supervisors believed Liguori was unsuitable for religious life or teaching (which was the order's predominant work) and tried to persuade her to return to her home in Ireland. When she refused she was effectively demoted and given more menial duties in the sisters' refectory which she was unhappy about. On 24 July 1920 she briefly left the convent without permission and spent time at a neighbour's home but came back to the convent later the same day. A doctor visiting the convent said that she was run down and told her to go to bed. Allegedly, Liguori refused a sedative believing that it was poisoned and fearing for her life she fled the convent that night barefoot and dressed only in her nightgown.

Liguori was taken in by sympathetic local Protestants who refused to reveal her location to the Catholic authorities. Dissatisfied with convent life, she wrote to the Bishop of Wagga Wagga, Joseph Wilfrid Dwyer, requesting to leave the order, a request that was refused. Liguori was taken to Sydney by E. B. Barton, the grandmaster of Protestant institution the Loyal Orange Lodge of New South Wales. She was then taken to the home of Congregational minister the Reverend William Touchell and his wife Laura, who lived at Kogarah.

During this time police and Catholic laymen were searching for Liguori. It was a time of significant sectarian division and conflict between Catholics and Protestants, and the popular press fed public interest with stories about the pursuit of the 'escaped nun'. The drama only intensified when a warrant for Liguori's arrest was issued. This was at the request of Bishop Dwyer, who had alleged that Liguori was insane. Liguori was eventually found and arrested and on 9 August 1921 appeared before the Lunacy Court. The court declared her sane and she was released on 13 August 1921, after having been remanded for observation against her will at the Reception House for the Insane in Darlinghurst. After her release she used her preferred name of Bridget Partridge and returned to stay with William and Laura Touchell. Seeking redress, and with the support of the Loyal Orange Lodge, Partridge subsequently sued Bishop Dwyer for £5,000 for false arrest and associated trauma, citing damage to her reputation. There was considerable media and public interest in the court proceedings, with hundreds lining up seeking admittance to the public galleries, many hoping to hear something sensational about the "mysteries of convent life". The trial lasted from 30 June until 13 July 1921. Partridge ultimately lost her bid in the Supreme Court when Justice (Sir) David Ferguson and a jury of four men found in the bishop's favour.

Several months later, on the night of 26 October 1921, while Partridge and the Touchells were returning home after attending a Home Mission Festival, Partridge was kidnapped by a group of about 20 men, including her brother. Partridge was pushed into a car and driven away. Her brother Joseph, who had travelled from Hong Kong to attend the court case, had previously attempted to have Partridge place herself under his care, something that she had refused to do. The following day, after being recognised, she was taken to police headquarters. Partridge renounced her religion and formally notified her brother that she would not accept being placed under his protection or return to Ireland.

== Death ==
Partridge continued to live with the Touchells for the rest of her life, travelling with them over the years to various towns in New South Wales. William Touchell died in 1954. Partridge and Laura Touchell were admitted to Rydalmere Mental Hospital in Parramatta in 1962. Laura Touchell died there in 1963 and Partridge died there on 4 December 1966 at the age of 76. Partridge never married and had no relatives in Australia. Only one mourner attended her funeral. She was buried at Rookwood Cemetery according to the customs of the Congregational Church.

== Legacy ==
Partridge's story inspired a novel by Maureen McKeown, The extraordinary case of Sister Liguori, which was published in 2017. The book was reviewed in the Journal of the Australian Catholic Historical Society by Jeff Kildea, who had previously presented a paper about Liguori at the society's conference. Kildea's subsequent book about Partridge, published in 2024, represents the culmination of 25 years of research. It is reported that a screenplay is in production and negotiations are underway for a movie about Partridge's life.

Partridge's story was reinterpreted from a modern, feminist perspective in an art exhibition held in 2021. This exhibition drew attention to the story as one of scandal and abuse, with comparisons to modern feminist struggles, and not just as a tale of sectarian conflict. Artist Amanda Bromfield's installation at the Wagga Wagga Art Gallery incorporated ceramics, found objects, and video performance. Sister Noella Fox, a Presentation Sister and historian, has said that while largely forgotten, Partridge's story is a very important part of the Presentation Sisters' family story.
