= Garba (see) =

The diocese of Garba (Latin: Dioecesis Garbensis) is a suppressed and titular see of the Roman Catholic Church.

== History ==
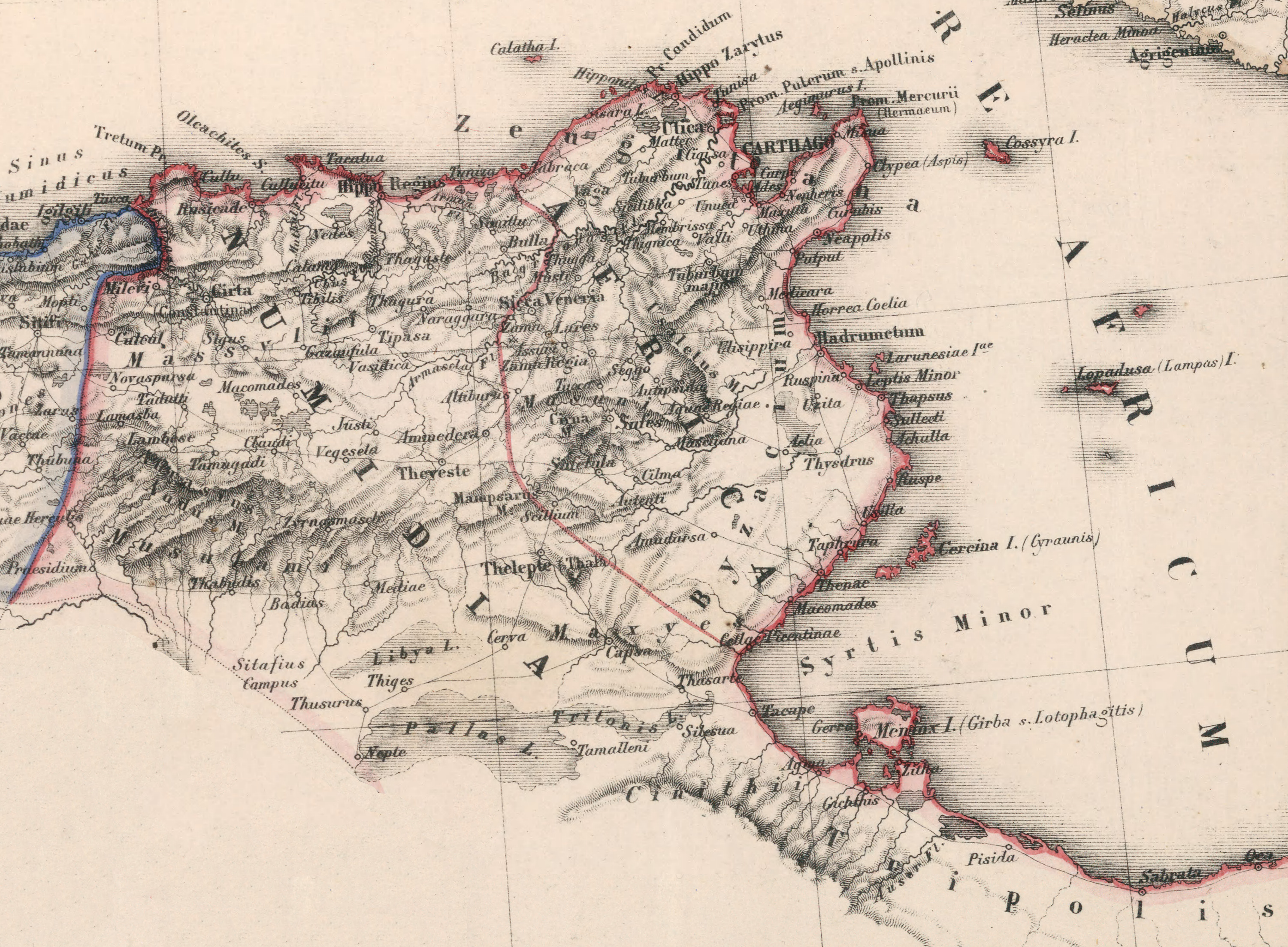
East Numidia.

During the Vandal Kingdom and the Roman Empire, Garba, was a civitas of the Roman province of Numidia, that is identifiable with the ruins at Aïn-Garb in today's Algeria. The town of Garba was also the seat of an ancient Christian episcopal seat.

There are three Bishops of Garba known to history.

- Bishop Victor the Donatist took part in the Council of Cirta in 305;
- At the Conference of Carthage of 411 between the Catholic and Donatist the town was represented by the Donatist Felix, who had no Catholic counterpart.
- Another Felix, this time a Catholic participated in the synod assembled in Carthage in 484 by the Vandal King Huneric, Felix was then exiled at the end of the council.

Today Garba survives only as a titular bishopric of the Roman Catholic Church and the most recent bishop was Mark S. Edwards, while he was auxiliary bishop of Melbourne from 2014 to 2020, prior to his appointment as Bishop of Wagga Wagga.
