= Edward Doody =

Australian Roman Catholic bishop

The Most Reverend Edward Doody
- Bishop of Diocese of Armidale
- Diocese: Armidale
- Installed: 22 April 1948
- Term ended: 9 April 1968
- Predecessor: John Aloysius Coleman
- Successor: James Darcy Freeman

Orders
- Ordination: 12 March 1927 at Rome by Basilio Pompili
- Consecration: 22 April 1948 at Cathedral of St Stephen, Brisbane by Giovanni Panico

Personal details
- Born: Edward John Doody; 15 December 1903 Brisbane, Queensland, Australia
- Died: 9 April 1968 (aged 64) Armidale, New South Wales, Australia
- Buried: Saints Mary and Joseph Catholic Cathedral, Armidale, New South Wales, Australia
- Denomination: Catholic Church
- Occupation: Catholic bishop
- Education: Pontifical Irish College; St Patrick's Seminary
- Motto: Pro Christo rege (For Christ the King)

Edward John Doody (15 December 1903 − 9 April 1968) was an Australian Roman Catholic bishop. He served as Bishop of Armidale for two decades.

== Early life ==
Doody was born in Brisbane, the son of John and Matilda Doody. He was the second-born of five children. He grew up in Warwick, Queensland, received his early education from the Sisters of Mercy and was educated at St Joseph's Christian Brothers College, Warwick, entering on its opening day in 1912. He graduated as dux of the college in 1919. He became the first student of the college to be raised to the priesthood.

He came from a devout family, with two of his sisters joining the Sisters of Mercy and his brother joining the Congregation of Christian Brothers.

In 1920, he went to St Columba's College, Springwood to commence his studies for the priesthood before joining St Patrick's Seminary. He excelled in his studies, winning awards for sacred scripture and moral theology in 1923. In 1924, he was selected by Archbishop James Duhig of Brisbane to go to Rome to pursue priestly studies. He was noted as a poet during his studies.

== Priesthood ==
Doody was ordained a priest on 12 March 1927 in Rome by Cardinal Basilio Pompili. At the conclusion of his studies in Rome, he had obtained a Doctorate of Divinity. He went to Ireland before returning to Australia and arrived back in Warwick in December 1927. His first appointed was to the parish of Ipswich as an assistant priest.

In 1929, he returned to Brisbane as secretary to Archbishop Duhig. From 1930 to 1935, he was the inspector of Catholic schools in the Archdiocese of Brisbane. In 1936, he was appointed parish priest of Nambour where he was instrumental in building a new convent at Pomona and building new churches in the parish. He served in the parish for 12 years before being raised to the episcopate.

== Episcopate ==
On 11 March 1948, Doody was appointed Bishop of Armidale, succeeding Bishop John Aloysius Coleman following his death on 22 December 1947. He became Armidale's first Australian-born Bishop. Doody was enthroned and consecrated on 22 April 1968 at Saints Mary and Joseph Catholic Cathedral, Armidale by Cardinal Norman Thomas Gilroy.

He worked to improve conditions for local Aborigines. From 1958, he received debutantes at an annual Aboriginal Ball. He publicly opposed the discrimination precluding Asians migrating to Australia.

In the 1950s, he was a strong supporter of B. A. Santamaria's fight against Communism. He was also a supporter of the New England New State Movement, and a member of its executive council, from 1949.

== Death ==
Doody died suddenly on 9 April 1968 at the age of 64 while still holding office. He is buried in Saints Mary and Joseph Catholic Cathedral, Armidale.

Catholic Church titles
Preceded by John Aloysius Coleman	Auxiliary Bishop of Brisbane; 1948–1968	Succeeded by James Darcy Freeman
