= Francis Carroll (archbishop of Canberra and Goulburn) =

Australian Catholic bishop (1930–2024)

His Grace The Most Reverend Francis Carroll
- 5th Archbishop of Canberra and Goulburn
- Church: Catholic Church
- Archdiocese: Roman Catholic Archdiocese of Canberra and Goulburn
- Province: Immediately Subject to the Holy See
- See: Canberra and Goulburn
- Installed: 25 June 1983
- Term ended: 19 June 2006
- Predecessor: Edward Bede Clancy
- Successor: Mark Coleridge
- Previous posts: Coadjutor Bishop of Wagga Wagga (1967-1968); Titular Bishop of Tasaccora (1967–1968); Bishop of Wagga Wagga (1968–1983)

Orders
- Ordination: 27 July 1954, Wagga Wagga, New South Wales by Francis Henschke, Bishop of Wagga Wagga
- Consecration: 5 September 1967, Wagga Wagga, New South Wales

Personal details
- Born: Francis Patrick Carroll; 9 September 1930 Ganmain, New South Wales, Australia
- Died: 14 March 2024 (aged 93) Wagga Wagga, New South Wales, Australia
- Buried: St Christopher's Cathedral, Canberra
- Denomination: Roman Catholic
- Parents: Patrick and Rose Carroll
- Occupation: Cleric
- Profession: Roman Catholic Bishop
- Motto: Nova et Vetera (New and Old)

Styles of Francis Carroll
- Reference style: His Grace, The Most Reverend
- Spoken style: Your Grace
- Religious style: Archbishop

Francis Patrick Carroll (9 September 1930 – 14 March 2024) was an Australian archbishop, the fifth Roman Catholic Archbishop of Canberra–Goulburn, serving between 1983 until his retirement in 2006. Prior to his election as archbishop, Carroll served as Bishop of Wagga Wagga between 1968 and 1983. Carroll served as president of the Australian Catholic Bishops Conference between 2000 and 2006. He died in Wagga Wagga on 14 March 2024, at the age of 93.

== Early career ==
Carroll was born in Ganmain, New South Wales, the second of seven children of Patrick and Rose Carroll. He was ordained a priest in 1954 in St Brendan's Church, Ganmain. After service in Griffith and Albury, Carroll was appointed to the role of Assistant Diocesan Inspector of Schools and became Director of Catholic Education for the Diocese of Wagga Wagga in 1965.

== Episcopate ==
In 1968 he was appointed the third Bishop of Wagga Wagga by Pope Paul VI. He was a spiritual director to the Cursillo movement and was a member of the first National Catholic Education Commission (from 1969 to 1971). In 1974, he was appointed to the International Catechetical Commission, an appointment he held for 18 years. He was the Australian representative at the Synod of Bishops on Catechesis in 1977 and was the first chairperson of the National Catholic Education Commission from 1974 to 1978, remaining a member until 1988.

In 1983 he was appointed Archbishop of Canberra – Goulburn with his seat at St Christopher's Cathedral, Manuka, Australian Capital Territory. In 1986, he welcomed John Paul II on his arrival in Australia.

Popularly known as "Father Frank", he served the Church in Canberra for 23 years. The development of Catholic schools in the archdiocese is a significant part of his legacy, in addition to his role in helping to bring about government aid to private schools in Australia.

He was also the first Australian bishop to call a diocesan synod since the Second Vatican Council. It was held in Canberra during 1989 with a subsequent synod in 2004. The synod's recommendations accepted by the archbishop were the formation of a commission for women, a commitment to resource and support the Catholic youth ministry team for a period of five years, the embracing of the concept of encouraging parishes to implement family-based sacramental programs and calling on parishes to consider the employment of pastoral associates possibly in conjunction with neighbouring parishes. However, the synod's proposals were not without their detractors.

In 2001, Carroll signed a decree that reduced the holy days of obligation to Christmas, the Assumption and every Sunday as the days on which Catholics in Australia are obliged to attend Mass.

As president of the Australian Catholic Bishops' Conference he sought to find ways to meet the Church's challenge of a decline in priestly vocations, including considering married priests:

Personally I, and I believe every Bishop, would value very, very highly the gift of celibacy, but I think some would be prepared to look at some relaxation of that discipline if that were to help.

Carroll also advocated for the extension of Australian visas for asylum seekers, particularly from Timor Leste. For over ten years, Carroll sought the creation of a special visa category for the East Timorese asylum seekers, most of whom are active members of the Catholic community and have lived in Australia. While this request was not approved by the Howard government, it triggered the personal intervention of the Minister for Immigration to grant permanent residency status to the asylum seekers where appropriate.

In August 2005, prior to attaining 75 years of age, Carroll submitted his resignation to Benedict XVI, which was accepted the following month, but he continued in the role until his replacement, Mark Coleridge, was appointed in June 2006.

== Honours ==
In 1986, Carroll welcomed Pope John Paul II to Australia during the Pope's visit there. Bob Hawke, Prime Minister of Australia at the time, was in attendance as well. Carroll was awarded the Centenary Medal on 1 January 2001 for "Service to Australian Society through the Roman Catholic Church".

In February 2006, as a result of a public appeal, a scholarship was established to help students attend the Canberra campus of the Australian Catholic University. The Francis Carroll Scholarship provides financial support to students who relocate from rural or regional areas of the Archdiocese of Canberra – Goulburn or the Diocese of Wagga Wagga to undertake an Education course at the Canberra campus. In May 2006, Carroll was awarded the Doctor of the University (Univ.D), honoris causa, the highest honour from the Australian Catholic University. The award recognised Carroll's contribution to Catholic education.

Carroll College Broulee, a Catholic High School on the south coast of NSW, was named after Carroll. The school opened in 1995.

Catholic Church titles
Preceded by Edward Bede Clancy	5th Archbishop of Canberra–Goulburn; 1983–2006	Succeeded by Mark Coleridge
Preceded by Francis Augustin Henschke	3rd Bishop of Wagga Wagga; 1968–1983	Succeeded by William John Brennan
Preceded by First	Titular Bishop of Tasaccora; 1967–1968	Succeeded by Benigno Chiriboga
