= Mark Edwards (bishop) =

Australian Catholic clergyman

The Most Reverend Mark Stuart Edwards OMI
- Bishop of Wagga Wagga
- Church: Latin Church
- Archdiocese: Sydney
- Diocese: Wagga Wagga
- See: Wagga Wagga
- Appointed: 26 May 2020
- In office: 22 July 2020
- Predecessor: Gerard Joseph Hanna
- Previous posts: Auxiliary Bishop of Melbourne (2014-20); Titular Bishop of Garba (2014-20)

Orders
- Ordination: 16 August 1986 by Thomas Francis Little
- Consecration: 17 December 2014 by Denis James Hart
- Rank: Bishop

Personal details
- Born: Mark Stuart Edwards; 14 June 1959 (age 67) Balikpapan, Indonesia
- Denomination: Roman Catholic
- Education: University of Divinity; Monash University
- Motto: Learn who you are in the eyes of God
- Coat of arms

Mark Stuart Edwards OMI (born 14 June 1959) is an Australian Roman Catholic prelate and professed member of the Missionary Oblates of Mary Immaculate appointed as the Bishop of Wagga Wagga. He has served in the past as a teacher and as a rector before his episcopal elevation.

== Life ==
Mark Stuart Edwards was born on 14 June 1959 in Indonesia as one of four children. His father was from South Australia and worked for Shell International in the Netherlands where he met his wife. The two relocated to Indonesia where Edwards and his brother were born before settling in Melbourne. His mother was a practising Catholic and his father was a devout Anglican.

His education was at Saint Leonard's school in Glen Waverley before he began his high school education at Mazenod College in Mulgrave. He obtained a Bachelor of Science from Monash in Clayton.

In 1980 he entered the novitiate of the Missionary Oblates of Mary Immaculate in Mulgrave and completed his ecclesial studies for the priesthood at Catholic Theological College in Melbourne. Edwards had made his first application aged seventeen though the Oblates delayed his admission because of his age. The Oblates accepted his reapplication when he had finished his BSc. He made his final profession of vows as an Oblate on 17 February 1984 and was ordained as a priest on 16 August 1986. Edwards returned to Monash later for further studies where he obtained a Bachelor of Letters and a PhD in philosophy in 2007.

Edwards taught at Mazenod College from 1986 until 1989 and was then teaching at Iona College in Brisbane from 1990 until 1997. From 1998 to 2004 he served as the Pre-Novice Master at Saint Mary's Seminary in Mulgrave prior to serving as novice master from 2004 until 2007. From 2005 to 2010 he served as a lecturer at Catholic Theological College while from 2007 to 2010 served as the Director of Scholastics at Saint Mary's Seminary. In 2011 he was appointed as the rector of Iona College in Brisbane.

Pope Francis appointed Edwards on 7 November 2014 as an Auxiliary Bishop of Melbourne and as the Titular Bishop of Garba. Edwards was in Canberra when the apostolic nuncio delivered the news and he later said that he was "surprised and humbled" to be selected as a bishop though lamented that he could no longer resume his teaching duties. Edwards received his episcopal consecration on 17 December 2014 at Saint Patrick's Cathedral from Archbishop Denis James Hart with Mark Benedict Coleridge and Paul Richard Gallagher serving as the co-consecrators. He served as the Episcopal Vicar for Tertiary Education and Youth. Edwards attended World Youth Day in Poland in 2016.

Pope Francis appointed Edwards on 26 May 2020 to serve as the new Bishop of Wagga Wagga in New South Wales. Edwards was installed as Bishop of Wagga Wagga on 22 July 2020 at St Michael's Cathedral, Wagga Wagga.

== Views ==
=== Mercy ===
Bishop Edwards has said that mercy leads us to understand God better and enables for people to be "strengthened" as dispensers of mercy to others. He has said that God's "tenderness is almost tangible" and He invites the faithful to open their hearts to receive the "free gift" of mercy which should be shared with others. Bishop Edwards continued that one's outward life must show mercy to others in order to be shown that same gift in return.

=== Christmas ===
In conversation with 774 ABC Melbourne's Jon Faine, Edwards said that he did not oppose stores selling Christmas merchandise months prior to the event since it showed that the Christian message resonated. He said that the initial preparations enabled people the chance to plan their Christmas celebrations with those around them since "the Christian message is perhaps still meeting people" to coordinate the proper celebration of Christmas. But he expressed his hope that retailers would hold off on the recitation of carols until closer to Christmas and expressed his opposition to churches placing decorations months prior since "Church decorations go up at the start of Advent" to mark the season of preparation.

=== Euthanasia ===
Edwards is a strong opponent of euthanasia. Following the Lower House affirmative vote on euthanasia he took to Twitter and posted: "This is not good for our vulnerable".
