= Our Lady of Sorrows, Peckham =

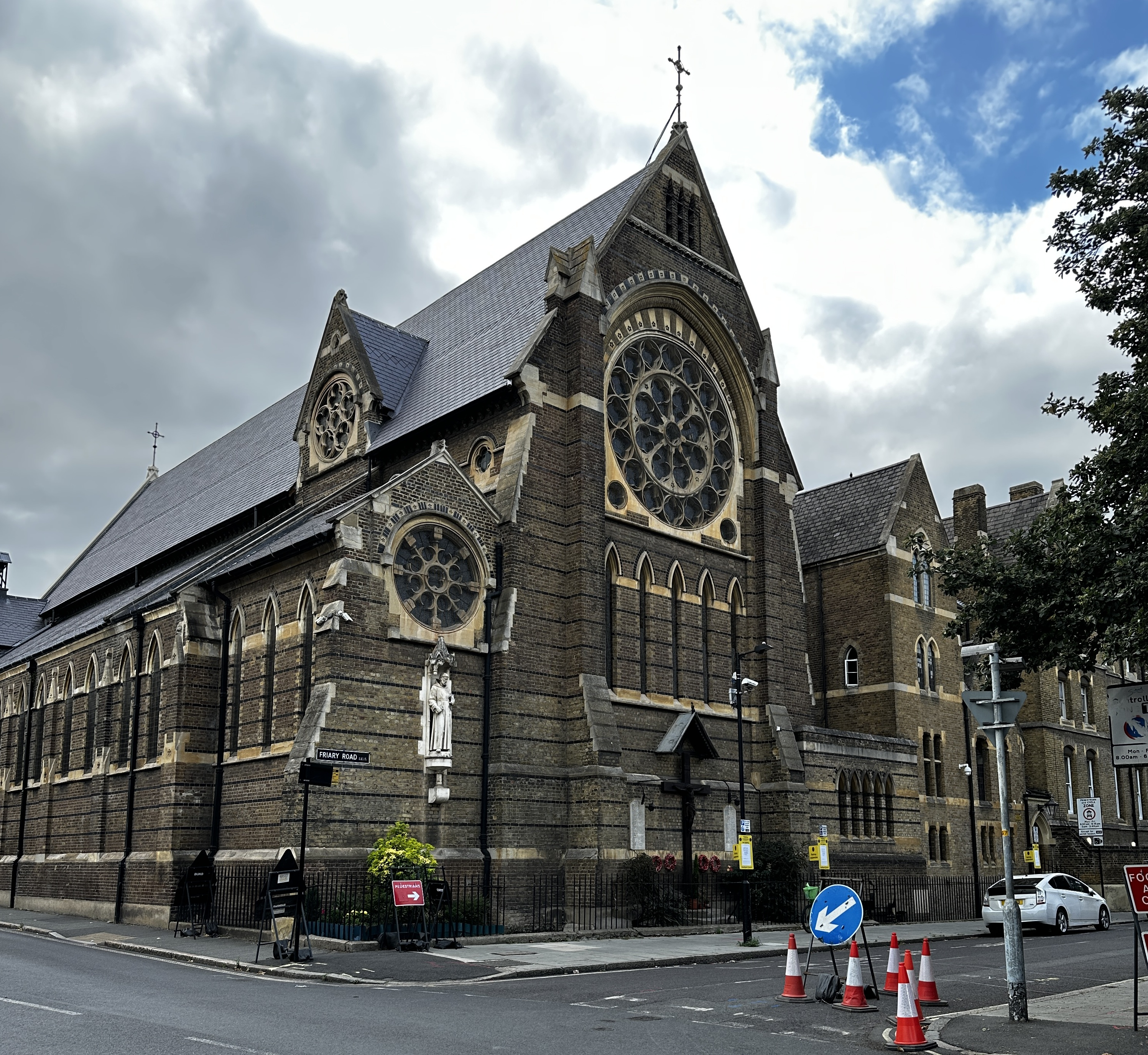

- Shown within the London Borough of Southwark
- 51.48°N 0.066°W
- OS grid reference: TQ 34384 77425
- Location: Peckham, Greater London
- Country: England
- Denomination: Roman Catholic
- Tradition: Latin Rite
- Website: catholicpeckham.org.uk

History
- Former name: Our Lady of Seven Delours

Architecture
- Functional status: Active
- Architect: E. W. Pugin
- Style: Gothic Revival
- Completed: 1866

Administration
- Archdiocese: Southwark

Listed Building – Grade II
- Designated: 27 September 1972
- Reference no.: 1376588

Our Lady of Sorrows, Peckham is a Roman Catholic church and parish in Peckham, London. The church, which has an adjacent friary, was founded by the Capuchin Friars in 1859 and is a Grade II listed building. Since 2022 it has been the UK home of the Norbertine canons (Canons Regular of Prémontré).

== History ==
The last Catholic bishop in England died during the reign of Elizabeth I. Following the Roman Catholic Relief Act 1829 the church was growing with Anglican converts and Irish immigration. In 1850 Pope Pius IX released a papal bull Universalis Ecclesiae re-establishing the Catholic hierarchy and diocesan structure. Bishop Thomas Grant was the first Catholic Bishop of Southwark and inherited a diocese with 58 churches and 67 priests. By 1869 the diocese had increased this to 159 churches and 183 priests.

One of these new churches was the one in Peckham. Bishop Grant invited the Capuchins to found the church in 1854, and the site was purchased in 1856. Initially they set up a small school, and modified a stable to form a chapel. The stable was replaced by a wooden structure and architect E. W. Pugin was invited to design a permanent church. The foundation stone is dated 1859, but due to lack of funds the church did not open until 1866. The adjacent friary opened in 1884 and the now derelict parish hall opened in 1937. The associated school was rebuilt in the 1880s after a fire, and was replaced with new buildings in the 1970s.

The Capuchin Friars remained in Peckham until 2000 when the church and parish was returned to the Archdiocese of Southwark. In 2014 the archdiocese invited the Congregation of the Mission (Vincentians) from Nigeria to run the parish and in 2022 they were replaced by the Canons Regular of Prémontré, who were previously in Chelmsford. The Norbertine Priory of Our Lady of Sorrows, Peckham was formally invested by the Archbishop of Southwark, John Wilson, on 29 September 2022.

== Building ==
The church was built in a gothic architectural style made out of London stock brick with a pitched slate roof. It has a large rose window at the east end with smaller rose windows in the aisles. There are two side chapels next to the sanctuary; one dedicated to St Francis with a statue by Mayer of Munich, and one a lady chapel. Pugin's high altar is in situ, with a second forward altar allowing mass to be performed with the priest facing the congregation (versus populum).

There is a chapel at the west end dedicated to Our Lady of Sorrows which contains a copy of Michelangelo's Pieta. This has marble tiling and slate panels listing the dead of the community. There is also a western gallery housing the organ.

The church was made a grade II listed building on 27 September 1972, under the previous name Our Lady of Seven Dolours. It is on the Heritage at Risk Register due to problems with the roof tiles and the derelict church hall. The National Churches Trust gave a £40,000 grant for repairs to the church in 2024.

The church was one of the 2025 Jubilee pilgrimage churches for the Archdiocese of Southwark.
