= Joseph Wilfrid Dwyer =

Australian bishop

Joseph Wilfrid Dwyer DD (1869–1939) was an Australian Catholic priest and Bishop of Wagga Wagga, New South Wales.

He was born on 12 October 1869, in East Maitland, New South Wales, to William Dwyer, school inspector, and his wife Anastasia Dermody. Both his parents were emigrants from Kilkenny, Ireland. His older brother Patrick Vincent Dwyer was the first Australian-born Bishop.

He was educated at St Aloysius College, Sydney, and St Patrick's College, Goulburn, and as was the policy of Bishop Murray, he studied for the priesthood in Clonliffe College Dublin and in Rome, where in 1894 he was ordained a priest at St. John’s Lateran.

He returned to Australia to become Professor at St. Patrick’s College in Goulburn, New South Wales, where he developed a keen interest in botany. Dwyer's red gum, Eucalyptus dwyeri was named in his honour by Joseph Maiden and William Blakely.

Joseph Dwyer became the first bishop of Wagga Wagga in 1917 when the diocese was created and was consecrated on 13 October 1918.

In 1920, Dwyer attracted attention when he secured the arrest of an "escaped nun", Sister Liguori, on the grounds that she was insane. The nun was arrested, but certified sane four days later. With the support of the Orange Order, she sued Dwyer for £5000 for wrongful arrest and mistreatment. The suit failed.

He died in Wagga Wagga, New South Wales, 11 October 1939.

Catholic Church titles
New title	1st Roman Catholic bishop of Wagga Wagga; 1918–1939	Succeeded by Francis Henschke
