= William John Brennan =

Australian Roman Catholic bishop

The Most Reverend William John Brennan
- 4th Roman Catholic Bishop
- Diocese: Wagga Wagga
- Installed: 16 January 1984
- Term ended: 5 February 2002
- Predecessor: Francis Carroll
- Successor: Gerard Hanna

Orders
- Ordination: 21 December 1960 (Priest)
- Consecration: 5 February 1984 (Bishop)

Personal details
- Born: 16 February 1938 Arncliffe, New South Wales, Australia
- Died: 31 August 2013 (aged 75) Randwick, New South Wales, Australia
- Buried: Crypt of St Michael's Cathedral, Wagga Wagga, New South Wales, Australia.
- Denomination: Roman Catholic Church
- Parents: Elvie and John Brennan
- Occupation: Roman Catholic bishop

William John Brennan (16 February 1938 – 31 August 2013) was an Australian Roman Catholic bishop.

== Early life ==
Brennan was born on 16 February 1938 in Arncliffe, the eldest son of John Joseph and Elvie Margaret Brennan. Two of his sisters joined the Ursuline Sisters. He was educated by the Ursuline Sisters at Ashbury, New South Wales and the Congregation of Christian Brothers in Lewisham. Following his graduation, he was accepted to studied for the priesthood at St Columba's College, Springwood, before moving to St Patrick's Seminary, Manly. He was then chosen to proceed to Pontificio Collegio Urbano de Propaganda Fide to continue his studies. While there, he gained a degree in theology.

== Priesthood ==
Brennan was ordained a priest for the Diocese of Wilcannia–Forbes in Rome on 21 December 1960 by Cardinal Gregorio Pietro XV Agagianian. Despite growing up in Sydney, his uncle, William Joseph Brennan, was Vicar General of the Diocese of Wilcannia–Forbes at the time of his entrance into the seminary.

His first appointment was as assistant priest of Forbes before being moved to Broken Hill. He became Director of Schools for the Diocese and then was appointed parish priest of Nyngan, then later Wentworth.

== Episcopacy ==
On 16 January 1984, Brennan was appointed Bishop of Wagga Wagga after Francis Patrick Carroll was appointed Archbishop of Canberra and Goulburn.

As Bishop of Wagga Wagga, he displayed a missionary zeal. When a priest from the Wagga diocese wondered why he had to be sent to some isolated “God-forsaken” parish, Brennan retorted: “I went from Sydney to the remote parishes of Wilcannia-Forbes diocese to serve as a priest precisely so they would not be God-forsaken parishes”. He also consulted widely on the roles of women and young people in the Church. In 1987, when the Australian Catholic Bishops Conference terminated the mandate of the politically controversial Catholic Commission for Justice and Peace and reasserted episcopal control, Brennan was appointed Chairman of the Australian Catholic Social Justice Council.

In 1989, he announced he was founded a new seminary in Wagga Wagga, believing the situation at St Patrick's Seminary, Manly had become dire, with lax discipline and orthodox seminarians often being refused entry. He also believed priests destined to minister in large and remote parishes would be better prepared within their own diocese and in a semi-rural environment. In 1992, he opened Vianney College in Wagga Wagga. Since opening, the seminary has produced 70 priests, including two bishops (Bishop Michael Kennedy and Bishop Columba Macbeth-Green OSPPE).

Under his episcopacy, the Diocese of Wagga Wagga also became a safe haven for religious orders which had struggled to find home elsewhere. The Confraternity of Christ the Priest which had been founded in the Diocese of Townsville relocated to Wagga Wagga after Bishop Leonard Faulkner initiated proceedings to have it canonically dissolved. In 1998, he also welcomed three sisters from Western Australia who felt they were being called to a more traditional form of Dominican religious life than their current order was living. After four years of living 'ad experimentum in the Wagga Wagga Diocese, the community was formally erected as a Religious Community of Diocesan Right in 1993 by Brennan, with the approval of the Sacred Congregation for Religious and Secular Institutes.

== Death ==
On 5 February 2002, Brennan resigned due to illness at the age of 63, 12 years short of the canonical retirement age of 75. He had suffered a "massive stroke" (page 303) in November 2001 while celebrating Mass. He lived out the rest of his life as an invalid, but still showed edifying patience and resignation throughout his time in care.

On 31 August 2013, Brennan, at the age of 75, died at Little Sisters of the Poor Nursing Home in Randwick, New South Wales. One of his sisters, Sister Therese, lovingly dedicated herself to his daily personal care after his stroke. His funeral service was held in St Michael's Cathedral, Wagga Wagga and he was interred in the crypt.

Cardinal George Pell wrote in his obituary for Brennan that "despite a dour public persona, Brennan was good company and a fine raconteur. A formidable opponent, he was personally courteous, kind to his priests and universally respected by his brother bishops for his loyalty, competence and hard work for the conference, despite the fact that a majority disagreed with a good part of his theological views and proposed remedies. He knew that reform is never accomplished without division, incomprehension and sometimes bitter opposition. He confronted this courageously, without any melodrama, but it took a toll on his health".

Brennan was one of the first leaders of the Gospel fightback in Catholic Australia. In catechetical circles the prevailing line was that "transubstantiation" was too long and formal a word to be used with young people. Brennan thought this was "nonsense" (page 304) and said "it has the same number of syllables as reconciliation" (page 304). Brennan served as Diocesan Inspector of Schools. He understood the necessity of Catholic content in catechesis. This realisation was another driving force during his time as bishop, where he developed and refined a new R.E. syllabus, "We belong to the Lord".

Catholic Church titles
Preceded by Francis Carroll	4th Roman Catholic bishop of Wagga Wagga; 1984—2002	Succeeded by Gerard Hanna
