= Diocese of Wagga Wagga =

Latin Catholic territory in Australia

Diocese of Wagga Wagga Dioecesis Corvopolitana
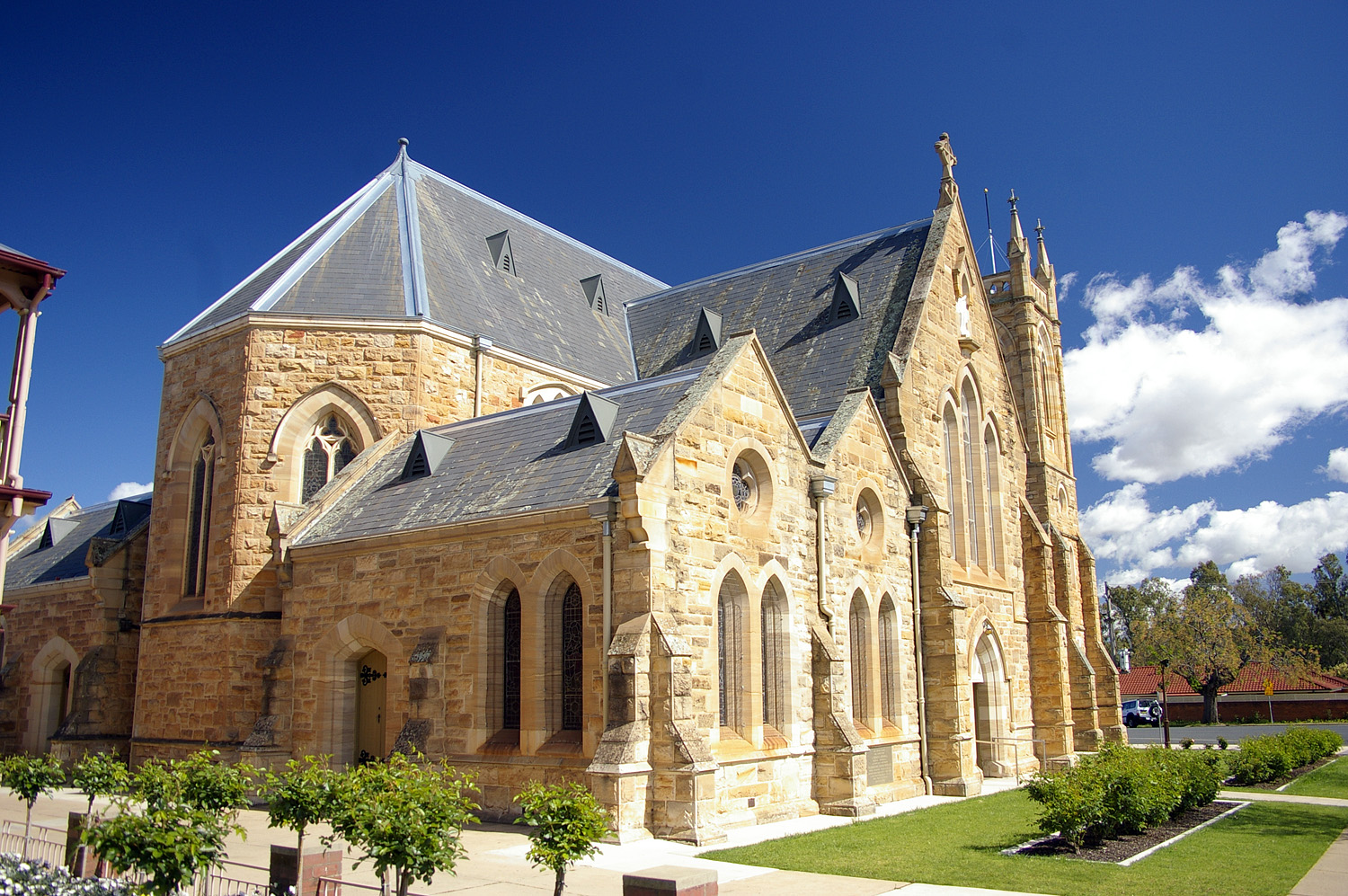
- St Michael's Cathedral, Wagga Wagga; consecrated in ca. 1859

Location
- Country: Australia
- Territory: Riverina regions of New South Wales
- Ecclesiastical province: Sydney
- Metropolitan: Archdiocese of Sydney
- Deaneries: 3
- Coordinates: 35°06′26″S 147°22′21″E

Statistics
- Area: 62,160 km^{2} (24,000 sq mi)
- Population: Total; Catholics: (as of 1999); ▲206,000; ▲62,000 ( 30.1%)
- Parishes: 31
- Schools: 29

Information
- Denomination: Catholic Church
- Sui iuris church: Latin Church
- Rite: Roman Rite
- Established: 28 July 1917
- Cathedral: St Michael's, Wagga Wagga
- Patron saint: St Mary MacKillop

Current leadership
- Pope: Leo XIV
- Bishop: Mark Stuart Edwards OMI
- Metropolitan Archbishop: Anthony Fisher OP
- Vicar General: Henry Ibe VG
- Bishops emeritus: Gerard Joseph Hanna

Map

Website
- Catholic Diocese of Wagga Wagga

The Diocese of Wagga Wagga is a Latin Church suffragan diocese of the Archdiocese of Sydney, established in 1917, covering the Riverina region of New South Wales in Australia.

St Michael's Cathedral is the seat of the Catholic Bishop of Wagga Wagga. On 12 September 2016, Pope Francis accepted the resignation of Bishop Gerard Hanna due to health and age concerns and appointed Christopher Prowse to be the Apostolic Administrator. On 26 May 2020 Pope Francis announced that Bishop Mark Edwards OMI would be the sixth Bishop of Wagga Wagga, to be installed as Bishop on 22 July 2020 at St Michael's Cathedral.

Vianney College is the diocesan seminary.

== Bishops ==
=== Bishops of Wagga Wagga ===
The following individuals have been elected as Roman Catholic Bishop of Wagga Wagga:

Order	Name	Date enthroned	Reign ended	Term of office	Reason for term end
1	Joseph Wilfrid Dwyer	14 March 1918	11 October 1939	21 years, 211 days	Died in office
2	Francis Augustin Henschke	16 November 1939	24 February 1968	28 years, 100 days	Died in office
3	Francis Patrick Carroll	24 February 1968	25 June 1983	15 years, 121 days	Elevated to Archbishop of Canberra and Goulburn
4	William John Brennan	16 Jan 1984	5 February 2002	18 years, 20 days	Resigned and appointed Bishop Emeritus of Wagga Wagga
5	Gerard Joseph Hanna	5 February 2002	12 September 2016	14 years, 224 days	Retired due to reaching age 75 and due to ill health and appointed Bishop Emeritus of Wagga Wagga
6	Mark Edwards	22 July 2020	present	6 years, 121 days	

=== Coadjutor bishop ===
- Francis Patrick Carroll (1967–1968)

=== Other priests of this diocese who became bishops ===
- Edward Idris Cassidy, appointed nuncio and titular Archbishop in 1970; future Cardinal
- Michael Robert Kennedy, appointed Bishop of Armidale in 2011

== Cathedral ==
Located in Johnston Street, Wagga Wagga, St Michael's Cathedral is a large Gothic Revival styled sandstone cathedral built in two stages. The foundation stone of the first stage of the building comprising the nave and tower base, was laid on 26 April 1885. Completed between 1885 and 1887, the parish church was commissioned by Father Patrick Dunne and designed by architects Tappin, Gilbert & Dennehy, of Melbourne. The woodwork and carpentry was completed by Charles Hardy. In 1918, when the diocese was erected, St Michael’s became a cathedral.

The second stage followed, that commenced in 1922 and completed in 1925. The architect was W. J. Monks, and the overall construction cost was £34,894. The imposing building was constructed from sandstone, of cruciform plan with clerestoried nave and lofty tower placed to the left of the main façade. In addition, the building consists of side aisles, porch, chancel, sacristy, chapel, and gallery. Roof framings are exposed timber internally and sheeted with slates externally. Walls are rock faced ashlar generally with dressed window and door surrounds and mullions. Internally the altars contain some finely crafted marble pieces and large stained glass windows in groups of three, giving a soft filtered light. A feature of the cathedral is the massive tower bell weighing 17 long hundredweight (1,900 lb; 860 kg) cast in the factory of Byrnes, of Dublin. The marble high altar was brought from Carrara, Italy and has subsequently been removed.

=== Cathedral organ ===
George Fincham built a two-manual organ of 10 speaking stops for St Michael's Church in 1887. This was removed in 1892 and installed in the Chapel of St Peter at the Church of England Grammar School, Melbourne. The present organ, installed on the rear gallery in 1999 by Laurie Pipe Organs, was built by Samuel Lewis, an employee of George Fincham, who was his first apprentice as far back as 1864 and his first foreman, it is thought for the Dorcas Street Presbyterian Church in South Melbourne; it originally had two manuals and 17 speaking stops. It was installed at the Presbyterian Church, Denbigh Road, Armidale, in 1911 and in 1939 the mechanical action was converted to tubular-pneumatic by C.W. Andrewartha, who supplied a detached console. The casework with its carved transom rails, may also date from this time. The instrument was rebuilt in 1975 by Laurie Pipe Organs who converted the manual actions back to mechanical, electrified the pedal and stop actions, provided a new attached drawstop console, and supplied new Mixtures to the Great and Swell, a Trumpet 8 ft, and the pedal upper work. In 2011 it was given a small overhaul by Darrell Pitchford. The front facade pipes were changed to silver and the stop mechanisms and pipes were cleaned and adjusted.

== Parishes ==
- Albury
- Albury North
- Albury–Lavington
- Albury–Thurgoona
- Berrigan
- Cathedral
- Coolamon
- Corowa
- Culcairn
- Darlington Point–Colleambally/Jerilderie
- Finley
- Ganmain
- Griffith
- Holbrook
- Howlong
- Jerilderie^{1}
- Junee
- Khancoban
- Leeton
- Lockhart
- Mulwala
- Narrandera
- Tarcutta
- The Rock
- Tocumwal
- Tumbarumba
- Urana
- Wagga Wagga South
- Wagga Wagga West
- Wagga Wagga–Kooringal

^1. In 2009 Jerilderie became incorporated to the Darlington Point. Parish Administrator Rev Fr Anthony Dunne was appointed until the appointment of Rev Fr Blaise Kurek. Despite sharing a priest, Jerildierie is listed as a separate parish

== Seminary ==
Vianney College is the diocesan seminary. It also accepts seminarians from other regional dioceses, eparchies and religious orders. In 1989, Bishop William John Brennan, announced he would found a new seminary in Wagga Wagga, believing the situation at St Patrick's Seminary, Manly had become dire, with lax discipline and orthodox seminarians often being refused entry. He also believed priests destined to minister in large and remote parishes would be better prepared within their own diocese and in a semi-rural environment. In 1992, he opened Vianney College in Wagga Wagga. By 2000, the Diocese of Wagga Wagga had more students studying for the priesthood than the Archdiocese of Sydney.

The college primarily educates students to prepare for the Catholic priesthood, although it accepts some lay students for certain courses. Its courses are recognised by Charles Sturt University and Pontifical Urban University. As well as educating students for the Diocese of Wagga Wagga, it has also educated students who have been ordained for the archdioceses of Melbourne and Sydney; the dioceses of Sandhurst, Wilcannia–Forbes, Armidale, Lismore, Port Pirie, Broken Bay and Hamilton, New Zealand; as well as for the Maronite Catholic Eparchy of Saint Maron of Sydney. It has also educated students for religious orders, including Order of Saint Paul the First Hermit and the Confraternity of Christ the Priest. As of 2026, it had eight students in formation for the priesthood.

Since opening, the seminary has produced 70 priests, including two bishops (Bishop Michael Kennedy and Bishop Columba Macbeth-Green OSPPE).

== Schools ==
The list below shows the schools in the diocese who are governed by Catholic Edution Diocese of Wagga Wagga (CEDWW) https://ww.catholic.edu.au/. Their attributed parish is also shown. The diocese is split into four areas and the schools are allocated based on proximity.

=== Albury region ===
Secondary School

- Xavier High School, Albury – North Albury

Primary Schools

- St Patrick's Catholic School – Albury
- St Anne's Catholic School – North Albury
- St Mary's Catholic School – Corowa

=== Griffith region ===
Secondary Schools

- Marian Catholic College – Griffith
- St Francis de Sales Regional College – Leeton

Primary Schools

- St Patrick's Primary School – Griffith
- St Joseph's Primary School – Leeton
- St Mary's Primary School - Yoogali

=== Wagga Wagga region ===
Secondary Schools

- Kildare Catholic College – Our Lady of Fatima, South Wagga Wagga
- Mater Dei Catholic College – Sacred Heart, Kooringal

Primary Schools

- All Saints Catholic Primary School – Tumbarumba
- Henscke Catholic Primary School – Our Lady of Fatima, South Wagga Wagga
- Holy Trinity Catholic Primary School – West Wagga Wagga
- Mater Dei Catholic Primary School – Sacred Heart, Kooringal
- Sacred Heart Catholic Primary School – Sacred Heart, Kooringal
- Saint Joseph's Catholic Primary School – Cathedral, Central Wagga Wagga
- Saint Joseph's Catholic Primary School – Junee
- Saint Michael's Catholic Primary School – Coolamon
- Saint Brendan’s Catholic Primary School – Ganmain
- Saint Joseph’s Catholic Primary School – Lockhart

== See also ==
- Roman Catholicism in Australia
