= Michael Sheehan (coadjutor archbishop of Sydney) =

Irish priest, educator and Coadjutor Archbishop

Michael Sheehan (17 Dec 1870 – 1 March 1945) (Irish: Micheál Ó Síothcháin) was an Irish priest, educator and a Coadjutor Archbishop of the Catholic Archdiocese of Sydney in Australia (1922-1937). He was also a notable scholar of the Irish language.

== Biography ==
Born on 17 December 1870 in the Newtown area of Waterford city, County Waterford, Ireland, being the sixth of the children born until then to Cornelius and Ann Sheehan. Cornelius Sheehan was born in Newmarket, County Cork, and owned an export business. Ann Sheehan (née Lawler) was raised an Anglican, the daughter of a Church of Ireland minister.

Michael received private tuition early in life, and was then taught by the Christian Brothers at the Mount Sion schools in the city. From the age of 11, when the family moved to Dungarvan, he attended the Augustinian school. Deciding to become a priest he went to St. John's College, Waterford, for 11 months, prior to going to Maynooth College at the age of 20. At Maynooth he had an outstanding record as a student, completing his studies two years before he was of canonical age, and spent those two years teaching in St. John's College, Waterford.

He was ordained in June 1895, in the Cathedral of the Most Holy Trinity (Within), Waterford, and in that year he was awarded an M.A. from the Royal University of Ireland. In 1896 he went on to pursue Classical studies at Oxford University, where he received an M.A., followed by studies at the German universities of Greifswald (studying Latin, Greek and Sanskrit) and Bonn, where he received his Ph.D Bonn. His thesis (written in Latin) was on the Athenian orator Isocrates.

On returning to Ireland he was appointed in 1909 to the chair of Classics in Maynooth. He also served as the chief examiner of Latin and Greek for the state Intermediate education board.

He was a leading activist in the movement for the revival of the Irish language, and helped found Ollscoil na Mumhan in An Rinn, county Waterford in 1906. It is said that in 1916 he wrote the words of the hymn Ag Críost an Síol. In 1919 he became vice-president of Maynooth College, and in 1922 he moved to Australia after he was consecrated Coadjutor Archbishop of Sydney. In 1928 he was involved in the International Eucharistic Congress in Sydney.

His textbook Apologetics and Catholic Doctrine, defending the faith in a very rationalist style, was widely used in Catholic schools. It is remembered positively in the autobiographies of B. A. Santamaria and Thomas Keneally. Santamaria wrote, "Sheehan's Apologetics and Christian Doctrine (sic) provided me, as a schoolboy at matriculation standard, with the rational justification for my act of faith in Catholic Christianity." A revised seventh edition was published in 2014.

Ill health was the main cause of his retirement, though his decision was also influenced by the fact that he would not be appointed to the Sydney See, since the Church preferred an archbishop of Australian birth (although he had been appointed with right of succession). He returned to Ireland in June 1937, to live with the Holy Ghost Fathers, in Blackrock, County Dublin. He also spent much of his time in the An Rinn, Gaeltacht studying Irish where he had a cottage, and in 1944 revised his 1906 book on the Irish dialect of the area, Sean-chaint na nDéise: The idiom of living Irish.

He died at St Mary’s, Talbot Lodge, Blackrock, Dublin on 1 March 1945. He was buried in the little graveyard outside the entrance to St Nicholas’ church in An Rinn.

== Publications ==
- Apologetics and Catholic Doctrine by Archbishop Michael Sheehan
- Sean-chaint na nDéise: The idiom of living Irish by Sheehan, M, M.H. Gill & Son Ltd, Dublin, 1906
- Sean-chaint na nDéise. : The idiom of living Irish by Sheehan, M., Revised Edition, Dublin Institute for Advanced Studies, 1944
- Cró Croilleadh Craobhaighe by Sheehan, Dr. Micheal, 1907
- Cnuasacht Trágha by Sheehan, Dr. Micheal, M. H. Gill and Son, 1908
- Árthach an Óir by Sheehan, Rev. Micheal, M. H. Gill and Son Ltd, 1910
- Gile na mBláth: with notes and vocabulary by Sheehan, Dr. Micheal, Gill, Dublin, 1912
- Gabha na Coille by Sheehan, Dr. Micheal, M. H. Gill and Son, 1915
- Leabhar den Lus Mór by Sheehan, Dr. Micheal, 1917
- An Teagasc Críostaidhe by Sheehan, Dr. Micheal, 1917
- The Irish of Ring, Co. Waterford, A Phonetic Stud by Sheehan, Dr. Micheal
- A Child’s Book of Religion by Sheehan, Most Rev. Micheal, M.H. Gill and Son, Dublin, 1934
- A Simple Course of Religion by Sheehan, Most Rev. Micheal, M.H. Gill and Son, Dublin, 1937
