= Roman Catholic Diocese of Armidale =

Latin Catholic territory in Australia

Diocese of Armidale Dioecesis Armidalensis
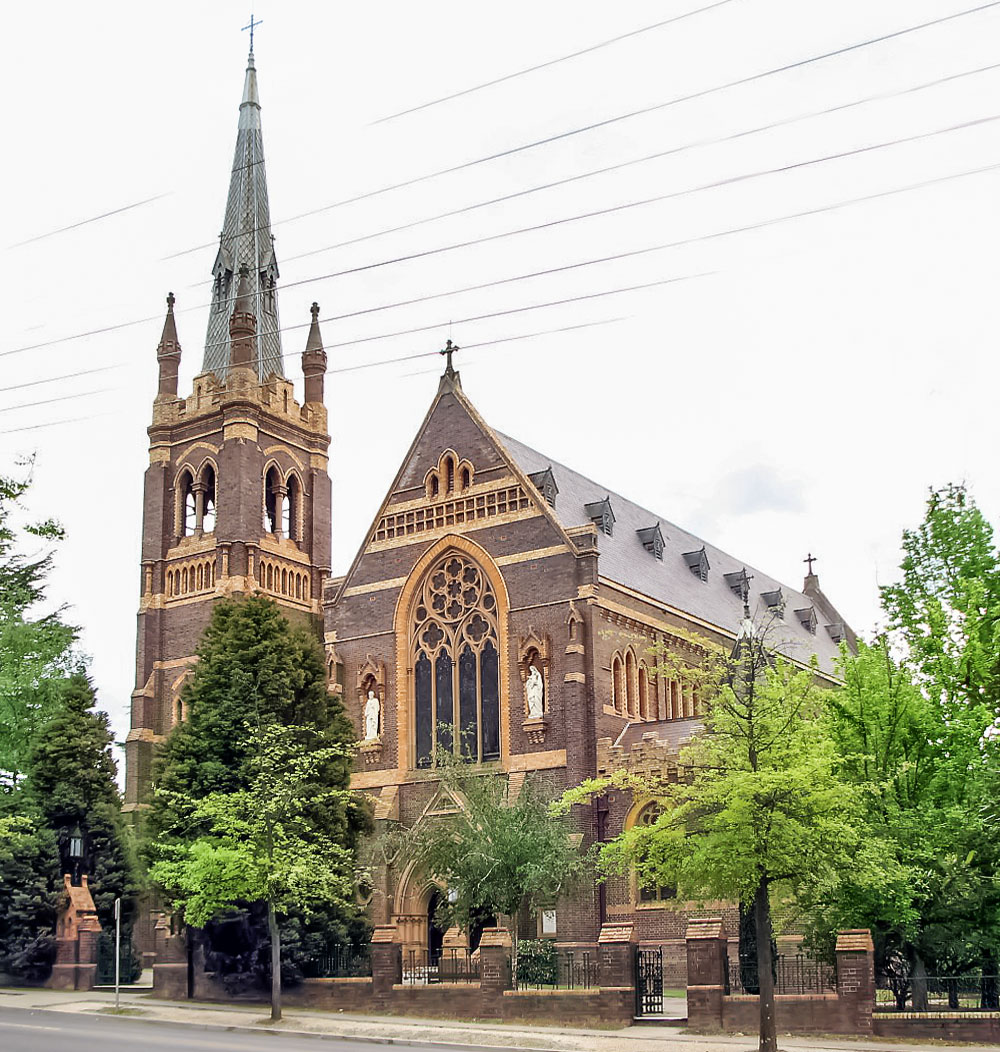
- Cathedral of St Mary and St Joseph, Armidale; consecrated in 1912

Location
- Country: Australia
- Territory: New England and Barwon River regions of New South Wales
- Ecclesiastical province: Sydney
- Coordinates: 30°30′58″S 151°39′50″E

Statistics
- Area: 91,500 km^{2} (35,300 sq mi)
- Population: Total; Catholics: (as of 2022); 184,229; 42,490 (23.1%)
- Parishes: 25

Information
- Denomination: Catholic Church
- Sui iuris church: Latin Church
- Rite: Roman Rite
- Established: 28 November 1862
- Cathedral: Saints Mary and Joseph Catholic Cathedral

Current leadership
- Pope: Leo XIV
- Bishop: Peter Murphy
- Metropolitan Archbishop: Anthony Fisher OP

Website
- armidale.catholic.org.au

The Diocese of Armidale is a Latin Church ecclesiastical jurisdiction or diocese of the Catholic Church in Australia. It is a suffragan in the ecclesiastical province of the metropolitan Archdiocese of Sydney. The Diocese of Armidale was established by 1862 and covers the New England and Barwon River regions of New South Wales.

Saints Mary and Joseph Catholic Cathedral is the cathedra of the Bishop of Armidale, previously vacant after Michael Kennedy was appointed to the Diocese of Maitland-Newcastle. On February 27th 2025, news broke that Pope Francis had appointed Rev. Dr Peter Murphy the new Bishop of Armidale.

Up until this point the Administrator was Monsignor Edward (Ted) Wilkes, and the administrator sat with the other Australian Bishops while attending the Parramatta funeral of former Bishop Kevin Manning in 2024.

Archbishop Anthony Fisher was principal consecrator of Bishop Peter Mel Murphy. The catholic weekly published the homily. The occasion was published on youtube.

== History ==
Erected 28 November 1862. (See footnote also for succinct list of past and present appointments.) Promptly following the philanthropic acquisition and dedication of land on the western side of central park Armidale, the foundation stone of the first of two brick cathedrals was laid and blessed on 8 December 1870, by the Administrator Monsignor John Thomas Lynch, an alumnus of St Patrick's Maynooth Ireland, on the same day that St Joseph was named as the patron of the Universal Church. The first bishop, Most Reverend Timothy O'Mahony D.D, an alumnus of the Irish College in Rome and a director of the missionary movement of Propaganda Fide for Ireland, was forced to resign over politically motivated false allegations of alcoholism and fathering a child, although he was eventually cleared by a church investigation and subsequent events. A sesquicentenary celebration of Bishop O'Mahony's installation at Armidale, by Archbishop Polding, an English Benedictine, was celebrated on 9.3.2021 and led by Archbishop Fisher and Bishop Kennedy. A large white 2021 dated memorial stone has since been installed on the south side of the cathedral front doors-complementing that on the north side of the cathedral Pyrmont sandstone front doors that commemorates another significant event being the February 5 1911 blessing and laying of the foundation stone of the current cathedral by Cardinal Moran. Archbishop Mannix, an alumnus of Maynooth College Ireland, preached at the consecration on December 11, 1919.

== Bishops ==
Bishops of Armidale:

Order	Name	Title	Date installed	Term ended	Term of office	Reason for term end
1	Timothy O'Mahony	Bishop of Armidale	1869	July 1877	7–8 years	Resigned from Rome
2	Elzear Torreggiani	Bishop of Armidale	November 1879	January 1904	24–25 years	Died in office
3	Patrick O'Connor	Coadjutor Bishop of Armidale	May 1903	January 1904	0–1 year	Succeeded as Bishop of Armidale
3	Patrick O'Connor	Bishop of Armidale	January 1904	July 1932	27–28 years	Died in office
4	John Coleman	Coadjutor Bishop of Armidale	September 1929	July 1932	2–3 years	Succeeded as Bishop of Armidale
4	John Coleman	Bishop of Armidale	July 1932	December 1947	14–15 years	Died in office
5	Edward Doody	Bishop of Armidale	25 April 1948	9 April 1968	19 years, 350 days	Died in office
6	James Darcy Freeman	Bishop of Armidale	December 1968	1971	2–3 years	Elevated as Archbishop of Sydney
7	Henry Kennedy	Bishop of Armidale	February 1972	26 April 1991	18–19 years	Retired
8	Kevin Manning	Bishop of Armidale	10 July 1991	10 July 1997	6 years, 0 days	Elevated as Bishop of Parramatta
9	Luc Julian Matthys	Bishop of Armidale	March 1999	December 2011	11–12 years	Retired as Emeritus Bishop of Armidale
10	Michael Kennedy	Bishop of Armidale	February 2012	February 2023	10–11 years	Appointed to Maitland–Newcastle.
11	Peter Murphy	Bishop of Armidale	8 May 2025			

James Darcy Freeman was elevated to Cardinal in 1973, concurrent with Archbishop of Sydney.

Coadjutors are included above.

=== Other priests of the diocese who became bishops ===
- Jeremiah Joseph Doyle, appointed Bishop of Grafton in 1887
- John Steven Satterthwaite, appointed Coadjutor Bishop of Lismore in 1969
- Gerard Joseph Hanna, appointed Bishop of Wagga Wagga in 2002

== Cathedral ==
The diocesan cathedral is dedicated to Saint Mary and Saint Joseph and is located in Dangar Street, Armidale, opposite Armidale Central Park and diagonally opposite the Anglican cathedral. It was built in 1911 of Pyrmont stone and Armidale polychrome brick. It was solemnly dedicated on 12 December 1919.

== Parishes ==
As of November 2014, there are currently 25 parishes located in Diocese of Armidale:

- Armidale Cathedral
- Barraba
- Bingara, administered by Barraba
- Boggabri, administered by Narrabri
- Bundarra, administered by Uralla
- Dungowan
- Glen Innes
- Gunnedah
- Guyra
- Sacred Heart, Inverell
- Manilla
- Moree
- Mungindi, administered by Moree
- St Xavier, Narrabri
- St Brigid, Quirindi
- St Nicholas, East Tamworth
- St Edward, South Tamworth
- St Patrick, West Tamworth
- St Mary, Tenterfield
- Uralla
- Walcha
- Walgett
- Warialda
- St Andrew, Wee Waa
- Werris Creek
