= St. Augustine's =

St. Augustine's may refer to:

== Places ==
- St Augustine's (UK Parliament constituency), a former constituency in Kent, England
- St Augustine's (electoral ward), an electoral ward in Penarth, Wales
- Bay of Saint-Augustin, Madagascar

== Places of Worship ==
- St. Augustine's Church (disambiguation)
- St. Augustine Catholic Church (disambiguation)
- St. Augustine Catholic Church and Cemetery (disambiguation)
- St Augustine's Abbey (disambiguation)
- Cathedral of Saint Augustine (disambiguation)

== Schools ==
- St. Augustine High School (disambiguation)
- St. Augustine's College (disambiguation)
- Saint Augustine Elementary School (disambiguation)
- St Augustine of Canterbury School (disambiguation)
- St. Augustine Catholic High School (disambiguation)
- Saint Augustine School (Laredo, Texas), United States
- St. Augustine's Catholic School (Culver City, California), United States
- Saint Augustine School, Tanza, Philippines
- St Augustine of Canterbury Catholic Primary School (Gillingham, Kent), England
- St. Augustine's Day School, Shyamnagar, West Bengal, India
- St. Augustines School (Vasai), India

== See also ==
- Saint Augustine (disambiguation)
