= Saint Augustine (disambiguation) =

Saint Augustine or Augustine of Hippo (354–430) was a bishop, theologian and Latin Church Father who is considered a saint in Christian tradition.

Saint Augustine may also refer to:

== People ==
- Augustine of Canterbury (died 604), first Archbishop of Canterbury
- Augustine Webster, English Catholic martyr
- Eysteinn Erlendsson (died 1188), Archbishop of Nidaros, latinized as Augustinus Nidrosiensis

== Places ==
- Saint Augustine, Trinidad and Tobago
- St. Augustine, Ontario, Canada
- St Augustine's (UK Parliament constituency), Kent, England
  - Lathe of St. Augustine, an historical division of Kent
- St. Augustine, Florida, United States
- St. Augustine, Illinois, United States
- St. Augustine, Maryland, United States
- Saint Augustin, Madagascar
- St. Augustin, Coburg, a parish church in Coburg, Germany

== Schools ==
- St. Augustine Preparatory School, Buena Vista Township, New Jersey, United States
- St. Augustine's College (Cape Coast), Ghana
- St. Augustine's Catholic School (Culver City, California), United States
- St. Augustine Academy (Lakewood, Ohio), Ohio, United States
- Saint Augustine High School (Laredo, Texas), Texas, United States
- St Augustine's Catholic School, Scarborough, North Yorkshire, United Kingdom
- St. Augustine's Day School (Shyamnagar), West Bengal, India
- Saint Augustine School (Tanza), Philippines
- St. Augustine Girls' High School, Trinidad and Tobago
- St. Augustine's High School (Vasai), Maharashtra, India
- St. Augustine School, in College Park East, Saskatoon, Canada

== Music ==
- "St. Augustine", a song by moe.
- "St. Augustine", a song by Band of Horses

== Other uses ==
- USS St. Augustine (PG-54), a United States Navy gunboat during World War II
- St. Augustine grass
- St Augustine's Hospital, Chartham, Kent, England (closed 1993)
- St Augustine's Tower, Hackney, London, England
- Chair of St Augustine in Canterbury Cathedral, Kent, England
- Saint Augustine House, a landmark building in Mexico City

== See also ==
- Augustinus (disambiguation)
- Augustine (disambiguation)
- Cathedral of Saint Augustine (disambiguation)
- Enchiridion of Augustine
- "I Dreamed I Saw St. Augustine", a song by Bob Dylan
- Order of Saint Augustine, Catholic religious order
- Presidio San Augustin del Tucson
- Saint-Augustin (disambiguation)
- St. Augustine Catholic Church (disambiguation)
- St. Augustine Catholic Church and Cemetery (disambiguation)
- St Augustine of Canterbury School (disambiguation)
- St. Augustine Catholic High School (disambiguation)
- St. Augustine High School (disambiguation)
- St. Augustine's (disambiguation)
  - St Augustine's Abbey (disambiguation)
  - St. Augustine's Church (disambiguation)
  - St. Augustine's College (disambiguation)
  - St Augustine's Priory, Ealing
  - St. Augustine's Seminary (disambiguation)
- San Augustin Mountains
- San Augustine, Texas
- San Augustine County, Texas
- Sankt Augustin
- Siege of St. Augustine (1702)
- Siege of St. Augustine (1740)
- Sant'Agostino (disambiguation)
- San Agustín (disambiguation)
