= St. Augustine's Church =

St. Augustine's Church (British English: St Augustin's or St Augustine's) refers to many churches dedicated either to Augustine of Hippo or to Augustine of Canterbury, the first Archbishop of Canterbury.

== Australia ==
- St Augustine's Church, Salisbury, South Australia
- St Augustine's Anglican Church, Leyburn, Queensland

== Austria ==
- St. Augustine's Church, the official name of the Augustinian Church, Vienna, Austria

== Algeria ==
- Saint Augustin Basilica, Annaba, Algeria

== Chile ==
- St. Augustine Cathedral, Talca, Chile

== Denmark ==
- St. Augustine's Church, Copenhagen

== Germany ==
- St. Augustin, Coburg
- St. Augustine's Monastery (Erfurt)
- Church of St Augustine of Canterbury, Wiesbaden

== India ==
- Church of St. Augustine, Goa
- St. Augustine's Church, Kulasekharamtaly

== Italy ==
- Sant'Agostino, Rome

== Malta ==
- St Augustine Church, Valletta
- Church of St Augustine, Victoria

== New Zealand ==
- St Augustine's Church, Christchurch

== Philippines ==
- Saint Augustine Parish Church (Baliuag)
- San Agustin Parish Church (Bay, Laguna)
- San Agustin Church (Manila)
- St. Augustine Parish Church (Paoay), in Ilocos Norte

== Poland ==
- St. Augustine's Church, Warsaw

== United Kingdom ==
=== Bristol ===
- St Augustine the Less Church, Bristol (demolished 1962)
- St Augustine's Church, Whitchurch, Bristol

=== Derbyshire ===
- St Augustine's Church, Derby

=== Dorset ===
- St Augustin's Church, Bournemouth

=== Greater Manchester ===
- St Augustine's Church, Pendlebury, City of Salford

=== Hertfordshire ===
- St Augustine's Church, Broxbourne

=== Kent ===
- St Augustine's Abbey, Canterbury, Kent
- St Augustine's Church, Brookland
- St Augustine's Church, Gillingham, Kent
- St Augustine's Church, Ramsgate (Shrine of St Augustine of England), Kent

=== London ===
- St Augustine Papey, City of London (demolished)
- St Augustine Watling Street, City of London
- St Augustine's, Kilburn, City of Westminster
- St Augustine's Church, Slade Green, London Borough of Bexley

=== Norfolke ===
- St Augustine's Church, Norwich, Norfolk

=== Nottinghamshire ===
- St Augustine's Church, Sookholme

=== Somerset ===
- St Augustine's Church, West Monkton, Somerset

=== Staffordshire ===
- St Augustine's Church, Rugeley (built 1823)
- St Augustine of Canterbury, Rugeley (former church, built 12th century)
- St Austin's Church, Stafford

=== Sussex ===
- St Augustine's Church, Brighton (closed 2002)
- St Augustine's Church, Flimwell, East Sussex

=== Wales ===
- St Augustine's Church, Penarth, Wales
- St Augustine's Church, Rumney, Wales

=== West Midlands ===
- St Augustine's Church, Edgbaston, Birmingham
- St Augustine of England Church, Solihull

=== Wiltshire ===
- St Augustine's Church, Even Swindon, Wiltshire, England

=== Yorkshire ===
- St Augustine's Church, Hedon, East Riding of Yorkshire
- St Augustine's Church, Wrangthorn, Leeds
- St Austin's Church, Wakefield

== United States ==
- St. Augustine Cathedral (Bridgeport, Connecticut)
- Saint Augustine by the Sea Catholic Church, Hawaii
- St. Augustine Church Complex, Covington, Kentucky
- St. Augustine Parish (Isle Brevelle) Church, Natchez, Louisiana
- St. Augustine Church (New Orleans), Louisiana
- St. Augustine's Church (Austin, Minnesota)
- St. Augustine's Church (Brooklyn)
- St. Augustine's Church (Bronx)
- St. Augustine's Church (Manhattan), New York
- Church of St. Augustine (Larchmont, New York)
- St. Augustine Church (Cincinnati), Ohio
- St. Augustine Church (Pittsburgh)
- St. Augustine Church (Philadelphia), Pennsylvania
- St. Augustine Church (Dallas, South Dakota)
- Saint Augustine Church, Montpelier, Vermont
- Saint Augustine Church (New Diggings, Wisconsin)
- St. Augustine's University Historic Chapel, Raleigh, North Carolina
- Saint Augustine Chapel and Cemetery, Boston, Massachusetts
- St. Augustine Parish (Hartford, Connecticut)
- St. Augustine's Episcopal Church (Gary, Indiana)
- St. Augustine's Episcopal Church Complex, Croton-on-Hudson, New York
- Cathedral Basilica of St. Augustine, St. Augustine, Florida

== See also ==
- Church of St Mary and St Augustine, Stamford, Lincolnshire, England
- St Augustine's Tower, Hackney, Hackney, London, England
- Cathedral of Saint Augustine (disambiguation)
- San Agustin Church (disambiguation)
- Saint Augustine (disambiguation)
- St Augustine's Abbey (disambiguation)
- St. Augustine Catholic Church (disambiguation)
- St. Augustine Catholic Church and Cemetery (disambiguation)
