= San Agustín =

San Agustín is the Spanish-language name for St. Augustine.

San Agustín may also refer to:

== People ==
- Joe T. San Agustin, Guamanian politician

== Places ==
=== Argentina ===
- San Agustín, Córdoba
- San Agustín, Santa Fe

=== Bolivia ===
- San Agustín, Bolivia
- San Agustín River, a river in Bolivia

=== Colombia ===
- San Agustín, Huila

=== El Salvador ===
- San Agustín, Usulután

=== Guatemala ===
- San Agustín Acasaguastlán

=== Honduras ===
- San Agustín, Copán

=== Mexico ===
==== Chihuahua ====
- San Agustín, Chihuahua

==== Hidalgo ====
- San Agustín Metzquititlán
- San Agustín Tlaxiaca

==== Jalisco ====
- San Agustín, Jalisco

==== State of Mexico ====
- San Agustín Altamirano, State of Mexico

==== Mexico City ====
- San Agustín de las Cuevas

==== Monterrey ====
- Plaza Fiesta San Agustín, a shopping mall in Monterrey, Mexico

==== Oaxaca ====
- San Agustín Amatengo
- San Agustín Atenango
- San Agustín Chayuco
- San Agustín de las Juntas
- San Agustín Etla
- San Agustín Loxicha
- San Agustín Tlacotepec
- San Agustín Yatareni

=== Spain ===
- San Agustin, Las Palmas, Canary Islands
- San Agustín, Teruel
- San Agustín del Guadalix

=== Philippines ===
- San Agustin, Isabela
- San Agustin, Romblon
- San Agustin, Surigao del Sur
- San Agustin, Samar Gandara

=== Peru ===
- Church of San Agustín, Lima

=== Trinidad and Tobago ===
- Saint Augustine, Trinidad and Tobago

=== United States ===
- Cathedral of San Agustin
- San Agustin de Laredo Historic District
- St. Augustine, Florida
- San Augustine, Texas
- Plains of San Agustin, located in the U.S. state of New Mexico

== Other uses ==
- Asociación Deportiva San Agustín, a Peruvian football club
- CB Bahía San Agustín, a basketball team in Palma, Majorca, Spain
- Colegio San Agustin, several schools with the name or a similar name
- Rancho San Agustin, Mexican land grant in modern California, United States
- San Agustin (band), an American musical group from Georgia
- San Agustin Church (Manila), an UNESCO World Heritage Listed church located in Intramuros
- San Agustin Transport, a bus company operating in South Luzon, Philippines
- Spanish ship San Agustín (1768), a warship launched in 1768
- University of San Agustin, Iloilo, Philippines

== See also ==
- Spanish ship San Agustín (disambiguation)
- Saint Augustine (disambiguation)
