= List of parishes in the Archdiocese of Hartford =

This is a list of parishes in the Roman Catholic Archdiocese of Hartford in Connecticut in the United States. It includes both active and closed parishes.

In 2017, the archdiocese announced that it was reducing its parishes from 212 to 127. It cited a massive decline in both the number of Catholics and the number of priests in the area since 1969 as necessitating this reorganization. The archdiocese merged and closed more parishes over the subsequent years.

== Active parishes ==
This is a list of active parishes in the Archdiocese of Hartford. Many of these parishes were created during the 2010s and 2020s through the merger of one or more other parishes. These merged parishes are now listed as churches.

Parish	Image	Church names and addresses	Description/notes
All Saints Parish – Founded in 2017 with the merger of St. Anne and Our Lady Parishes in Waterbury
		St. Anne Church, 515 South Main Street, Waterbury	Founded in 1886 for French-Canadian immigrants, church dedicated in 1889.
		Our Lady of Lourdes Church, 309 South Main Street, Waterbury	Founded in 1899 for Italian immigrants, church dedicated that same year
Basilica of the Immaculate Conception Parish – founded as a mission in 1847 church dedicated in 1928, became a minor basilica in 2008. Merged with Our Lady and St. Michael.
		Basilica (left) 74 West Main Street, Waterbury	
		Our Lady of Loretto, 12 Ardsley Road, Waterbury	Founded as a mission in 1970, became a parish in 1971, church dedicated in 1973
		St. Michael the Archangel, 75 Derby Avenue, Derby	Founded in 1903 for Polish immigrants, church dedicated in 1907
Annunciation Parish – Created in 2017 with the merger of St. Mary and Holy Spirit Parishes in Newington
		St. Mary Church, 626 Willard Avenue, Newington	Founded as a mission in 1920, current church dedicated in1931
		Holy Spirit Church, 183 Church Street, Newington	Founded in 1964, church dedicated in 1967
Assumption Parish		61 North Cliff Street, Ansonia	Founded in 1870, current church dedicated in 1907
Blessed Michael McGivney Parish – created in 2023 with the merger of eight parishes in New Haven
		St. Martin de Porres Church, 136 Dixwell Avenue, New Haven	Founded in 1942 for Cape Verde immigrants, church dedicated in 1949
		St. Aedan Church, 112 Fountain Street, New Haven	Founded in 1900, church dedicated in 1922.
		St. Anthony Church, 70 Washington Avenue, New Haven	Founded in 1903 for Italian immigrants, current church dedicated in 1905
		St. Michael Church, 29 Wooster Place, New Haven	Founded in 1889, first Italian parish in Connecticut, church dedicated in 1899
		St. Mary Church, 5 Hillhouse Avenue, New Haven	Founded in 1832, it is the second oldest parish in Connecticut. Current church dedicated in 1874
		St. Francis Church, 397 Ferry Street, New Haven	Founded in 1868 for Irish immigrants, church dedicated in 1969
		St. Stanislaus Bishop and Martyr Church, 9 Eld Street, New Haven	Founded in 1901 for Polish immigrants, current church dedicated in 1913
		St. Joseph Church, 129 Edwards Street, New Haven	Founded in 1900, church dedicated in 1905
Blessed Sacrament Parish		182 Robbins Street, Waterbury	Founded in 1911, current church dedicated that same year
Cathedral of St. Joseph – construction on first cathedral started in 1876, consecrated in 1892, destroyed by fire in 1956. Current cathedral consecrated in 1962
		140 Farmington Avenue, Hartford Cathedral (left)	
Christ the King Parish – created in 1917, consists of Corpus Christi and Incarnation Parishes in Wethersfield
		Corpus Christi Church, 601 Silas Deane Highway, Wethersfield	Founded as a mission in 1939, current church dedicated in 1965
		The Church of the Incarnation, 544 Prospect Street, Wethersfield	Founded in 1963, church dedicated in 1966
Holy Cross Parish		31 Biruta Street, New Britain	Founded in 1927, church dedicated in 1935
Holy Disciples Parish – created in 2022 with the merger of St. John and St. Mary Parishes in Watertown
		St. John the Evangelist Church, 21 Academy Hill, Watertown	Founded as a mission in the 1850s, became a parish in 1884, church dedicated in 1959
		St. Mary Magdalen Church, 16 Buckingham Street, Watertown	Founded in 1914
Holy Infant Parish		450 Racebrook Road, Orange	Church dedicated in 1951, became a parish in 1952
Holy Rosary Parish		10 Father Salemi Drive, Ansonia	Found in 1908 for Italian immigrants, church dedicated in 1967
Holy Trinity Mission		53 Capitol Avenue, Hartford,	1900
Midd-South Catholic Parish – created with the merger of Sacred Heart and St. John Parishes
		Sacred Heart Church, 910 Main Street South, Southbury	Founded as a mission in 1862, church dedicated in 1958
		St. John of the Cross Church, 1263 West Street, Middlebury	Founded in 1904, church dedicated in 1914
North American Martyrs Parish – created in 2017 with the merger of St. Mary and St. Rose Parishes in East Hartford St. Rose closed in 2024.
		St. Christopher Church, 538 Brewer Street, East Hartford	Founded as a mission in 1952, church dedicated in 1955
		St. Mary Church, 15 Maplewood Avenue, East Hartford	Founded in 1873, church dedicated in 1959
Our Lady of the Assumption Parish		81 Center Road, Woodbridge	Founded as a mission in 1924, current church dedicated in 1962
Our Lady of Fatima Parish		50 Kane Street, Fatima Square, Hartford	Founded in 1958 for Azorean and Portuguese immigrants, church dedicated in 1988
Our Lady of Fatima Parish		2071 Baldwin Street, Waterbury	Founded in 1971 for Portuguese immigrants, church dedicated that same year
Our Lady of Hope Parish – created with the merger of Immaculate Conception and Immaculate Heart Parishes
		Immaculate Conception Church, 3 Church Street North, New Hartford	Church dedicated in 1870, became a parish in 1881
		Immaculate Heart of Mary Church, 78 Litchfield Road, Harwinton	
Our Lady of Knock Parish – created with the merger of St. Patrick and St Mary Parishes
		St. Patrick Church, 110 Main Street, Farmington	Founded as a mission in 1885, became a parish in 1918, church dedicated in 1922
		St. Mary Star of the Sea Church, 16 Bidwell Square, Farmington	Founded in 1876 for Slovak and Irish immigrants, current church dedicated in 2004
Our Lady of Loreto Parish		12 Ardsley Road, Waterbury	1971
Our Lady of Mercy Parish		19 South Canal Street, Plainville	Church started in 1881
Our Lady of Mount Carmel Parish		785 Highland Avenue, Waterbury	Founded in 1923, current church dedicated in 1924
Our Lady of Perpetual Help Parish – created with the merger of St. Patrick and Our Lady Parishes
		St. Patrick Church, 25 Church Street, Route 317, Roxbury	Founded in 1885 as a mission for Irish immigrants
		Our Lady of Perpetual Help, 34 Green Hill Road, Washington	Church dedicated in 1940
Our Lady Queen of Angels Parish - created with the merger of three parishes in Meriden
		Our Lady of Mount Carmel Church, 109 Goodwill Avenue, Meriden	Founded in 1894 for Italian immigrants, church started in 1894
		Holy Angels Church, 585 Main Street, Meriden	Church dedicated in 1859, became a parish in 1887
		St. Joseph Church, 22 Goodwill Avenue, Meriden	Founded in 1900, church dedicated in 1908
Our Lady Queen of the Apostles Parish – Created with the merger of St. Mary and St. Jude Parishes in Derby St. Jude closed in 2023.
		St. Mary the Immaculate Conception Church, 212 Elizabeth Street, Derby	Found in 1851 for Irish immigrants, church dedicated in 1883.
Our Lady of Sorrows Parish		79 New Park Avenue, Hartford	Founded as a mission in 1887, became a parish in 1895, church dedicated in 1925
Precious Blood Parish – created with the merger of St. Mary and St. Agnes Parishes in Milford
		St. Mary Church, 70 Gulf Street, Milford	Founded in 1874, current church dedicated in 1955
		St. Agnes Church, 400 Merwin Avenue, Milford	Founded in 1954, current church dedicated in 1960
Prince of Peace Parish – created with the merger of Nativity and St. Teresa Churches
		Church of the Nativity, 48 East Street, Bethlehem	Founded as a mission in 1916, church dedicated in 1929, became a parish in 1972
		St. Teresa of Avila Church, 146 Main Street South, Woodbury	Founded as a mission in 1902, church dedicated in 1904, became a parish in 1955
St. Ambrose Parish – Created in 2016 with merger of St. Augustine and St. Monica Parishes in North Branford
		St. Augustine Church, 30 Caputo Road, North Branford	Founded as a mission in 1925, became a parish in 1941, current church dedicated in 1960
		St. Monica Church, 1331 Middletown Avenue, Northford	Founded as a parish in 1964, current church dedicated in 1978
St. Andrew Dung-Lac Quasi-Parish		467 South Quaker Lane, West Hartford	Founded in 2018 as a quasi-parish,
St. Ann Parish		289 Arch Road, Avon	Became a mission for Irish immigrants in the early 1900s, current church dedicated in 1957
St. Anthony Parish		4 Union City Road, Prospect	Founded as a mission in 1936, became a parish in 1943, current church dedicated in 1962
St. Augustine Parish		10 Campfield Avenue, Hartford	Founded in 1902 for Irish immigrants, church dedicated in 1912
St. Basil the Great Parish		525 Woodtick Road, Wolcott	Founded in 1955 as St, Pius X Church, current church dedicated in 1957.
St. Benedict of Nursia Parish – to be created in July 2025 with the merger of Resurrection and Most Holy Trinity Parishes in Wallingford
		Resurrection Church, 115 Pond Hill Road, Wallingford	Founded as a mission in 1867, became a parish in 1869, current church dedicated in 1887
		Most Holy Trinity Church, Wallingford	Founded as a mission in 1851, became a parish in 1867, current church dedicated in 1887
St. Bridget of Sweden Parish – created in 2017 with the merger of St. Bridget, Epiphany and St. Thomas Parishes in Cheshire Epiphany and St. Thomas are closed
		St. Bridget Church, 175 Main Street, Cheshire	Church dedicated in 1861, parish founded in 1871.
St. Catherine of Siena Parish		265 Stratton Brook Road West, Simsbury	Founded in 1974
SS. Cyril and Methodius Parish		55 Charter Oak Avenue, Hartford	Founded in 1902 for Polish immigrants
St. Damien of Molokai Parish – founded in 2017 with the merger of St. Joseph and St. Gabriel Parishes in Windsor.
		St. Gabriel Church, Windsor	Founded in 1865, became a parish in 1921, current church dedicated in 1916
		St. Joseph Church, Windsor	Founded as a mission for Irish immigrants in 1886, became a parish in 1892
St. Dunstan Parish		1345 Manchester Road, Glastonbury	Founded as a mission in 1970, became a parish that same year, current church started in 1974
St. Elizabeth of the Trinity Parish – Created with the merger of three parishes in North Haven
		St. Therese Church, 555 Middletown Avenue, North Haven	
		St. Barnabas Church, 44 Washington Avenue, North Haven	
		St. Frances Cabrini Church, 57 Pond Hill Road, North Haven	
St. Faustina Parish – created with the merger of St. Stanislaus and Ss. Peter and Paul Parishes
		St. Stanislaus Church, 82 Akron Street, Meriden	1891
		Ss. Peter and Paul Church, 139 North Orchard Street, Wallingford	1924
St. Francis of Assisi Parish		294 Church Street, Naugatuck	1866
St. Francis of Assisi Parish		1010 Slater Road, New Britain	Founded in 1942, church started in 1956
St. Francis de Sales Parish – created with the merger of St. Anthony and St. Ann Parishes in Bristol
		St. Anthony of Padua Church, 111 School Street, Bristol	Founded in 1920
		St. Ann Church, 215 West Street, Bristol	Founded in 1908
St. Francis Xavier Parish – created with the merger of St. Francis and Our Lady Parishes in New Milford
		St. Francis Xavier Church,126 Chestnut Land Road, New Milford	1871
		Our Lady of the Lakes Church, 3 Old Town Park Road, New Milford	1990
St. George Parish		33 Whitfield Street, Guilford	Founded as a mission in 1870, became a parish in 1887, current church dedicated in 1963
St. Gianna (Beretta Molla) Parish - created with the merger of St. Brigid and St. Mark Parishes in West Hartford
		St. Brigid Church, 1088 New Britain Avenue, West Hartford	Founded in 1917, current church dedicated in 1951
		St. Mark the Evangelist Church, 455 Quaker Lane South, West Hartford	Founded in 1942, current church dedicated in 1945
St. Isaac Jogues Ghanaian Catholic Quasi-Parish		1 Community Street, East Hartford	Founded as mission in 1964, current church dedicated in 1970. Became quasi-parish in 2019
Ss. Isidore and Maria Parish - created with the merger of St. Paul and St. Augustine Parishes in Glastonbury
		St. Paul Church, 2577 Main Street, Glastonbury	Founded in 1902, became a parish in 1954, current church dedicated in 1958
		St. Augustine Church, 55 Hopewell Road, South Glastonbury	Founded as a mission in 1878 and church dedicated that year, became a parish in 1902
St. Jeanne Jugan Parish – created with the merger of five parishes in Enfield. St. Adalbert closed in 2024
		Holy Family Church, 23 Simon Road, Enfield	
		St. Bernard Church, 426 Hazard Avenue, Enfield,	
		St. Martha Church, 214 Brainard Road, Enfield	
		St. Patrick Church, 64 Pearl Street, Enfield	Founded as a mission for Irish immigrants in 1850, church dedicated in 1904
St. Joachim Parish – create with the merger of St. Mary and St. Ann Parishes in New Britain
		St. Mary Church, 544 Main Street, New Britain	Founded in 1848, it was the first parish in New Britain. Church constructed in 1886
		St. Ann Church, 47 Clark Street, New Britain	
St. John XXIII Parish – Created with the merger of St. Louis and St. Lawrence Parishes in West Haven
		St. John Vianney Church, 300 Captain Thomas Boulevard, West Haven	
		St. Louis Church, 89 Bull Hill Lane, West Haven	Founded in 1888
St. John Bosco Parish – Created with merger of St. Mary and St. Therese Parishes in Branford
		St. Mary Church, 731 Main Street, Branford	1868
		St. Therese Church, 105 Leetes Island Road, Branford	1947
St. John Fisher Parish		30 Jones Hollow Road, Marlborough	
St. John Paul the Great Parish – created with the merger of St. Francis and St. Peter Parishes in Torrington
		St. Francis of Assisi Parish, 160 Main Street, Torrington	
		St. Peter Church, 107 East Main Street, Torrington,	
St. Joseph Parish		32 Jewett Street, Ansonia	1925
St. Joseph Parish		33 Queen Street, Bristol	Founded in 1864, current church dedicated in 1925
St. Joseph Parish		186 Main Street, Winsted	1853 open
St. Josephine Bakhita Parish – created with the 2017 merger of St. James and St. Elizabeth Parishes in Rocky Hill
		St. James Parish, 767 Elm Street, Rocky Hill,	1880
		St. Elizabeth Seton, 280 Brook Street, Rocky Hill	1985
St. Junipero Serra Parish – created with the merger of St. Margaret and St. Francis in South Windsor
		St. Margaret Mary Church, 80 Hayes Road, South Windsor	1961
		St. Francis of Assisi Church, 673 Ellington Road, South Windsor	1941
St. Justin - St. Michael Parish
		St. Justin Church, 230 Blue Hills Avenue, Hartford	1924
St. Kateri Tekakwitha Parish – created with the merger of three churches in Sharon and Kent
		St. Bernard Church, 52 New Street, Sharon,	
		Sacred Heart Church, 17 Bridge Street, Kent	
		St. Bridget Church, 7 River Road, Sharon	
St. Louis de Montfort Parish – created with the merger of three parishes in Litchfield and Goshen
		St. Anthony of Padua Church, 49 South Street, Litchfield	Founded in 1882 for Irish immigrants, church dedicated in 1948
		Our Lady of Grace Church, 715 Bantam Road, Litchfield	1970
		St. Thomas of Villanova Church, 71 North Street, Goshen	Founded as a mission in 1856, became a parish in 1934, current church dedicated in 1973.
St. Luke Parish – created with the merger of three parishes in Southington
		St. Aloysius Church, 254 Burritt Street, Southington	
		St. Dominic Church, 1050 Flanders Road, Southington,	
St. Margaret Parish		39 Academy Street 3rd Floor, Madison	
Maria, Reina de la Paz Parish			
		St. Lawrence O'Toole Church, 494 New Britain Avenue, Hartford	Founded as a mission in 1859, church dedicated in 1871, became a parish in 1885,
St. Marianne Cope Parish – created with the merger of St. Catherine and St. Philip Parishes in East Windsor
		St. Catherine of Siena Church, 6 Windsorville Road, East Windsor	Founded in 1887
		St. Philip Church, 150 South Main Street, East Windsor	Founded in 1926 for Polish immigrants, church dedicated in 1939
St. Martin of Tours Parish – created with the merger of St. Joseph, Immaculate Conception and St. Mary Churches
		St. Joseph Church, 4 Main Street, Canaan	Founded in 1850, current church dedicated in 1940
		Immaculate Conception Church, 4 North Street, Norfolk	Founded in 1851, church dedicated in 1865, became a parish in 1889
		St. Mary Church, 76 Sharon Road, Salisbury	Founded in 1854, church dedicated in 1876
St. Mary Parish		942 Hopmeadow Street, Simsbury	Founded as a mission in 1904, church dedicated in 1934
Mary, Gate of Heaven Parish – created in 2007 with the merger of St. Mary and St. Robert Parishes in Windsor Locks
		St. Mary Church, 42 Spring Street, Windsor Locks	Founded in 1852, church dedicated in 1853
		St. Robert Bellarmine Church, 52 South Elm Street, Windsor Locks	Founded in 1961
Mary, Mother of the Church Parish – Created with the merger of Ss. Peter and Paul and St. Leo Parishes in Waterbury
		Ss Peter and Paul Church, 67 Southmayd Road, Waterbury	Founded in 1920, church dedicated in 1955
		St. Leo the Great Church, 14 Bentwood Drive, Waterbury	Founded as a mission in 1971, became a parish in 1974, church dedicated in 1976
St. Matthew and St. Gregory the Great Parish – created with the merger of St. Gregory and St. Matthew Parishes in Bristol
		St. Gregory the Great Church, 235 Maltby Street, Bristol	Founded in 1957
		St. Matthew Church, 120 Church Avenue, Bristol	Founded as a mission in 1864, became a parish in 1918, current church started in 1986
St. Maximilian Kolbe Parish – created in 1917 with the merger of three churches in Plymouth and Thomaston
		Immaculate Conception Church, 170 Main Street, Plymouth	Church dedicated in 1870, became a parish in 1881
		St. Casimir Church, 17 Allen Street, Terryville	Founded in 1900 for Polish immigrants, church dedicated in 1907
		St. Thomas Church, 1 East Main Street, Thomaston	Founded in 1868
St. Michael Parish		25 Maple Avenue, Beacon Falls	Founded as a mission in 1885, became a parish in 1924, current church dedicated in 1956
St. Michael Parish		62 St. Michael Drive, Waterbury	Founded as a mission in 1895, became a parish in 1902, current church dedicated in 1966
St. Nicholas Parish – created with the merger of St. Augustine and Good Shepherd Churches in Seymour
		St. Augustine Church, 35 Washington Avenue, Seymour	Founded as a mission in 1856, became a parish in 1885, current church dedicated in 1889
		Good Shepherd Church, 135 Mountain Road, Seymour	Founded in 1967
St. Patrick Parish		50 Church Street, Canton	Founded in 1856 for Irish immigrants, current church dedicated in 1936
St. Patrick Parish and Oratory		50 Charles Street, Waterbury	Church constructed in 1881, now operated by the Institute of Christ the King Sovereign Priest
St. Patrick-St. Anthony Parish – created in 1958 with the merger of St. Patrick and St. Anthony Parishes.
		St. Patrick-St. Anthony Church, 256 Church Street, Hartford Image (left)	Church built in 1958 on the ruins of St. Patrick Church.
		St. Patrick Church	Founded in 1829 for Irish immigrants, it was the oldest parish in Connecticut. Last church destroyed by fire in 1956
		St. Anthony Church	Founded in 1895 for Italian immigrants, church dedicated in 1921. Closed in 1958
St. Paul Catholic Parish – created with the 2017 merger of St. Paul and Sacred Heart Parishes
		St. Paul Church, 485 Alling Street, Kensington	Founded as a mission for Irish immigrants in 1872, became a parish in 1878, current church dedicated in 1918
		Sacred Heart Church, 48 Cottage Street, East Berlin	Church dedicated in 1897, became a parish in 1967
St. Paul VI Parish – created with the merge of St. Rita and Our Lady Parishes in Hamden
		St. Rita Church, 1620 Whitney Avenue, Hamden	Founded in 1928, current church dedicated in 1964
		Our Lady of Mt. Carmel Church, 2819 Whitney Avenue, Hamden	Founded in 1891 for Irish immigrants
St. Peter Claver Parish		47 Pleasant Street, West Hartford	Founded in 1966, current church dedicated in 1970
St. Pio of Pietrelcina Parish – created with the merger of three parishes in East Haven
		Our Lady of Pompeii, 355 Foxon Road, East Haven	Founded in 1941, current church dedicated in 1947
		St. Bernadette, 385 Townsend Avenue, East Haven	Founded in 1938
		St. Vincent de Paul, 80 Taylor Avenue, East Haven	Current church dedicated in 1914
St. Rose of Lima Parish		35 Center Street, Meriden	Founded in 1848 for Irish immigrants, church dedicated in 1856
St. Rose of Lima Parish		46 Church Hill Road Newtown	
St. Raphael Parish – created with the merger of St. Ann and St. Gabriel Parishes in Milford
		St. Ann Church, 501 Naugatuck Avenue, Milford	Founded in 1910 for Italian immigrants, became a parish in 1924
		St. Gabriel Church, 26 Broadway, Milford	Founded as a mission in 1908, church dedicated in 1923, became a parish in 1946
Sacred Heart Parish		26 Wintonbury Avenue, Bloomfield	Founded as a mission in 1878, became a parish in 1947, current church dedicated in 1963
Sacred Heart Parish	image	158 Broad Street, New Britain	Founded in 1894 for Polish immigrants, church started in 1897
Sacred Heart Parish		446 Mountain Road, Suffield	Founded as a mission in 1884, became a parish in 1913, current church dedicated in 1985
Sacred Heart of Jesus Korean Catholic Parish		56 Hartford Avenue, Wethersfield	Became a sub-parish in 2019
St. Stanislaus Parish		510 West Street, Bristol	Founded in 1919 for Polish immigrants, current church dedicated in 1956
St. Therese Parish		120 West Granby Road, Granby	Founded as a mission in 1950, became a parish in 1958, current church dedicated in 1973
St. Teresa of Calcutta Parish – created with the merger of four parishes in Manchester
		St. Brigid Church, 80 Main Street, Manchester	Founded in 1869, current church dedicated in 1903
		St. Bartholomew Church, 736 Middle Turnpike East, Manchester	Founded in 1958, current church dedicated in 1962
		St. James Church, 896 Main Street, Manchester	Founded in 1869, church dedicated in 1874
		Assumption Church, 27 Adams Street South, Manchester	Church dedicated in 1954, became a parish in 1955
St. Thomas and St. Timothy Parish – created with the merger of St. Thomas and St. Timothy Parishes in West Hartford
		St. Thomas the Apostle Church, 872 Farmington Avenue, West Hartford	Founded in 1920, church dedicated in 1951
		St. Timothy Church, 1116 North Main Street, West Hartford	Founded in 1958, current church dedicated in 1960
St. Thomas the Apostle Parish		733 Oxford Road, Route 67, Oxford	Founded as a mission in 1912, became a parish in 1966, current church dedicated in 1973
St. Vincent Ferrer Parish		1006 New Haven Road, Naugatuck	Founded as a mission in 1971, became a parish in 1974, church dedicated in 1983

=== Closed churches ===
This is a list of churches in the Archdiocese of Hartford that have been closed and deconsecrated.

Parish	Image	Address	Description/notes
Ascension Church		1050 Dunbar Hill Road, Hamden	Found in 1964, church dedicated in 1968. Closed in 2023
Blessed Sacrament Church		36 Cambridge Drive, East Hartford	Founded in 1948, last church dedicated in 1975, closed in 2017
Blessed Sacrament Church		321 Circular Avenue, Hamden	Church constructed in 1939, closed in 2017
Christ the Redeemer Church		325 Oronoque Road, Milford	Founded in 1966, closed in 2021
Epiphany Church		1750 Huckins Road, Cheshire	Founded in 1967, church dedicated in 1969, closed in 2017
Immaculate Conception Church		560 Park Street, Hartford	Founded in 1899, church dedicated in 1895, closed in 2000
Immaculate Conception Church		130 Summer Street, Southington	1915 closed
Mary Our Queen Church		248 Savage Street, Southington	Church dedicated in 1941, closed in 2022
Our Lady of Fatima Church		25 North Whittlesey Avenue, Wallingford	Founded in 1960, closed in 2021
Our Lady of Peace Church		370 May Road, East Hartford	Founded in 1971, closed in 2017
Our Lady of Victory Church		300 Captain Thomas Boulevard, West Haven	1935 closed 2022
Sacred Heart Church		24 Ely Street, Hartford	1872 closed in 2019
Sacred Heart Church		74 Liberty Street, New Haven	1876 closed 2017
Sacred Heart Church		116 Grove Street, Torrington	Founded by Slovak immigrants in 1915, church closed
Sacred Heart Church		13 Wolcott Street, Waterbury	Founded in 1885, church dedicated in 1889, closed in 2017
St. Adalbert Church		90 Alden Avenue, Enfield	Founded in 1915, closed in 2024
St. Andrew Church		396 Church Street, New Britain	Church constructed in 1896 for Lithuanian immigrants, became a parish in 1896, closed in 2017
St. Ann Church		930 Dixwell Avenue, Hamden	1919
St. Bernard Church		7 Maple Street, Simsbury	Founded in 1850 for Irish immigrants, current church dedicated in 1895 Closed in 2017
St. Brendan Church		455 Whalley Avenue, New Haven	Founded in 1913, closed in 1917
St. Clare Church		234 Coe Avenue, East Haven	Founded in 1947, closed in 2017
St. Dominic Church		1050 Flanders Road, Southington	Founded in 1971, closed in 2022
St. Elizabeth Church		731 Main Street, Branford	Founded as a mission in 1934, became a parish in 1966, church dedicated in 1969, closed in 2017
St. Francis Xavier Church		625 Baldwin Street, Waterbury	Founded in 1895, closed in 2023
St. Gabriel Church		26 Broadway, Milford	1946 closed 2017
St. Gertrude Church		550 Matianuck Avenue, Windsor	Founded in 1947, closed in 2022
St. Hedwig Church		32 Golden Hill Street, Union City	1906, closed in 2020
St. Helena Church		30 Echo Lane, West Hartford	1966 closed 2017
St. Jerome Church		New Britain	1958 closed in 2017
St. Joan of Arc Church		450 West Todd Street, Hamden	1971, closed in 2020
St. John the Baptist Church		786 Dixwell Avenue, New Haven	1893 closed 2017
St. John of the Cross Church		1263 West Street, Middlebury	Church dedicated in 1914, founded as a parish in 1916, closed in 2021
St. John the Evangelist Church		31 Newington Avenue, New Britain	closed in 2017
St. Joseph Church		195 South Main Street, New Britain	Founded in 1896, church dedicated in 1897, closed in 2017
St. Joseph Parish		140 South Main Street, Suffield	1916 closed in 2017
St. Joseph Parish		46 Congress Avenue, Waterbury	1894 Lithuanian closed 2017
St. Jude Church		71 Pleasant View Road, Derby	Church dedicated in 1961, closed in 2023
St. Laurent Church		121 Camp Street # 1, Meriden	Founded in 1880, closed in 2017
St. Lawrence Church		207 Main Street, West Haven	Founded in 1886, church dedicated in 1903, closed in 2021
St. Lucy Church		24 Branch Street, Waterbury	Founded in 1926 for Italian immigrants, church dedicated in 1964, closed in 2017
St. Luke Church		66 Bolton Street, Hartford	Founded in 1930, church dedicated in 1966. closed in 2017
St. Margaret of Scotland Church		289 Willow Street, Waterbury	Closed in 2017
St. Maria Goretti Church		1300 Woodtick Road,Wolcott	Church dedicated in 1975, closed in 2017
St. Mary Church		5 Sherman Place, Meriden	Founded in 1890 for German immigrants, church dedicated in 1913, closed in 2017
St. Mary Church		85 Pulaski Street, Torrington	Founded in 1919 for Polish immigrants, church dedicated in 1927, closed in 2017
St. Mary Church		338 North Main Street, Union City	Founded in 1907, church dedicated in 1923, closed in 2021
St. Maurice Church		100 Wightman Road, New Britain	1946 closed in 2017
St. Michael Church		7 Clark Street, Hartford	Founded in 1900, church dedicated in 1906, closed in 2017
St. Paul Church		West Haven	Founded in 1916, closed in 2017
St. Rose Church		33 Church Street, East Hartford	Founded in 1920, church dedicated in 1924. Church closed in 2024.
St. Peter Church		98 Franklin Square, New Britain	Founded in 1890 for German and Austrian immigrants, church dedicated in 1900, closed in 2017
St. Rose of Lima Church		115 Blatchley Avenue, New Haven	Founded in 1920, church dedicated in 1920, closed in 2024
St. Stanislaus Kostka Church		86 East Farm Street, Waterbury	1913 closed 2017
St. Stephen Church		400 Ridge Road, Hamden	Founded in 1915, last church dedicated in 1957, closed in 2020
St. Thomas Becket Church		435 North Brooksvale Road, Cheshire	Founded as a mission in 1970, closed 2025
St. Thomas Church		99 Bristol Street, Southington	Church dedicated in 1860, became parish in 1862, closed in 2021
