= Spanish ship San Agustín =

At least two ships of the Spanish Navy have borne the name San Agustín, after the Spanish spelling of Saint Augustine:

- Spanish ship San Agustín, a 16th-century Manila galleon commanded by Sebastião Rodrigues Soromenho
- Spanish ship San Agustín (1768), a 74-gun ship of the line

== See also ==
- San Agustín (disambiguation)
