= Stau =

Stau may refer to one of the following:

- In particle physics, stau is a slepton which is the hypothetical superpartner of a tau lepton
- An obsolete letter Stigma in the Greek alphabet
- In German, stau is a word meaning 'traffic jam'
- One common abbreviation of St. Augustine High School (disambiguation)
- In the fictional Vulcan language, stau is the verb 'to kill'
- An alternate name for the Horpa language
