= Catherine Coffey =

Teacher of Catholic catechism in colonial Australia

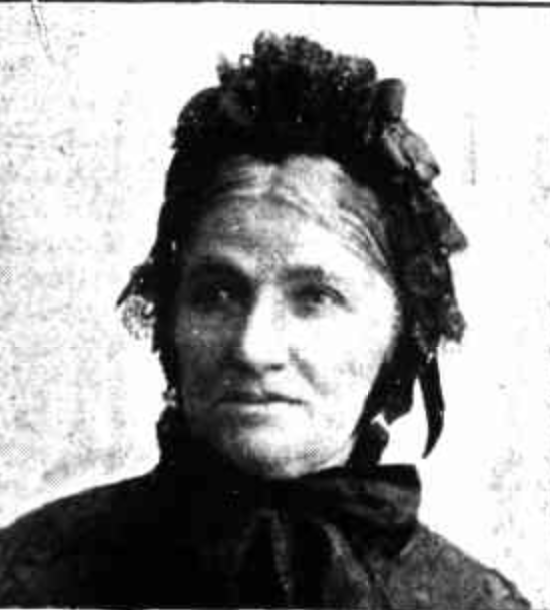
- Born: 1805; County Kerry, Ireland
- Died: 31 August 1894 (aged 89); Creswick, Victoria
- Other names: Catherine Coffee
- Occupation(s): Catechist; School teacher

Catherine Brosnaham Coffey (1805 – 31 August 1894) was an Irish-born Australian pioneer in the Port Phillip District who was the first Catholic school teacher in Melbourne and the first sacristan of the first Catholic church in Victoria, St Francis. She taught catechism classes to children in colonial Melbourne prior to the arrival of the colony's first Catholic priest in 1839. Coffey’s contribution to Catholic education was celebrated in a St Patrick’s Day pageant at the Melbourne Town Hall in 1930 and she was singled out by Archbishop Justin Simonds in 1939 in a requiem for pioneers as “an outstanding Catholic personality”.

== Early life and work ==
In 1838, Coffey travelled from Ireland to the Port Phillip District (now in Victoria), via Tasmania, with her husband Jeremiah and their infant child. They were early pioneers to the area, the first settlement on the banks of the Yarra River having taken place in 1835. The first Catholic priest, Patrick Geoghegan, a Franciscan friar, didn’t arrive in the colony until 1839, and Coffey taught Roman Catholic catechesis to children during the period when no Catholic priest was available. Roman Catholic canon law gives the responsibility of teaching children the catechism to pastors, bishops, clerics and members of religious societies. Coffey was the first lay person and the first woman reported to have taught the Catholic catechism to children in Victoria, and is referred to as the first teacher at a Catholic school in Melbourne. When Geoghegan arrived in 1839, he praised Coffey for her initiative and for her “care and zeal” in establishing and conducting the first school in Melbourne. Coffey’s contribution to Catholic education was celebrated in a St Patrick’s Day pageant at the Melbourne Town Hall in 1930. She was singled out by Archbishop Justin Simonds as “an outstanding Catholic personality” in a requiem for pioneers in 1939. Geoghegan used a small travelling wooden box that belonged to Coffey, covered with a linen cloth, as the altar for the first mass held in the Port Phillip District. This box is held by the Catholic Archdiocese of Melbourne at the Goold Catholic Museum.

== Family life and death ==
After leaving the Port Phillip District the Coffey family spent about 10 years on a property on the Great Dividing Range, before settling in Spring Hill, Creswick on some of the earliest land purchased in Victoria. They later moved to Ballarat.

Catherine and Jeremiah Coffey had a large family of ten children. In total, seven of their children predeceased them. The first died as an infant, and six died in their twenties. They were survived by their youngest three children, a son and two daughters who both became religious sisters and joined the Convent of the Good Shepherd in Bendigo.

An obituary published on 3 September 1894 noted: "Mrs Coffey was the mother of a fine family whose members were well known and highly respected in the district". Both Catherine and Jeremiah are buried in the Catholic section of the Creswick New Cemetery in regional Victoria.
