= San Agustin Church =

San Agustin Church may refer to:

- Iglesia San Agustín, Chile
- Iglesia de San Agustín (La Serena)
- Church of San Agustín (Quito), a church in Ecuador
- Church of San Agustín, Lima, a church in Peru
- San Agustin Church (Manila), a church in the Philippines
- San Agustin Church (Lubao), a church in Pampanga, Philippines
- Cathedral of San Agustin, a church in Laredo, Texas, U.S.
- Church of San Agustín (Madrid)

== See also ==
- St. Augustine's Church (disambiguation)
