= St. Augustine High School =

St. Augustine High School may refer to:

== United States ==
- St. Augustine Academy (Lakewood, Ohio)
- Saint Augustine High School (Laredo, Texas)
- St. Augustine High School (New Orleans), Louisiana
- St. Augustine High School (San Diego), California
- St. Augustine High School (Florida) (near St. Augustine)
- St. Augustine Catholic High School (Tucson, Arizona)
- St. Augustine Academy (Ventura, California)
- St. Augustine Preparatory School, Buena Vista Township, New Jersey

== Canada ==
- St. Augustine Catholic High School (Ontario), Markham, Ontario
- St. Augustine Catholic Secondary School, Brampton, Ontario

== United Kingdom ==
- St Augustine Academy, Maidstone, Kent, England
- St Augustine's Church of England High School, Kilburn, London, England
- St Augustine's High School, Edinburgh, Scotland
- St Augustine's High School, Redditch, England
- St Augustine's Roman Catholic High School, Billington, Lancashire, England

== See also ==
- St. Augustine Catholic High School (disambiguation)
- St Augustine's Catholic School, Scarborough, England
- St Augustine's Church of England High School, London, England
- St Augustine of Canterbury Catholic Academy, St Helens, England
- St. Augustine's College (disambiguation)
- Father Augustine Tolton Regional Catholic High School, Columbia, Missouri, United States
- St Augustine's Catholic College, Trowbridge, England
- Saint Augustine Elementary School (disambiguation)
- St Augustine of Canterbury School (disambiguation)
- Colegio San Agustin (disambiguation)
- Saint Augustine (disambiguation)
