= Saint Augustine Elementary School =

St. Augustine Elementary School may refer to:

- Saint Augustine Elementary School (Laredo, Texas)
- Saint Augustine Elementary School (Augusta, Kentucky)

== See also ==
- St. Augustine High School (disambiguation)
- St. Augustine's College (disambiguation)
- St Augustine of Canterbury School (disambiguation)
- Colegio San Agustin (disambiguation)
