= St. Augustine Catholic Church =

St. Augustine Catholic Church may refer to:

- St Augustine of England Church, Solihull, a Catholic church in England
- St. Augustine Catholic Church (Culver City, California)
- St. Augustin Catholic Church (Des Moines, Iowa)
- St. Augustine Catholic Church (Grayson Springs, Kentucky)
- St. Augustine's Catholic Church (Austin, Nevada)
- St. Augustine's Catholic Church (Minster, Ohio)
- St. Augustine's Catholic Church (Napoleon, Ohio)
- St. Augustine Catholic Church (Washington, D.C.)
- St Augustine's Catholic Church, Salisbury, Australia.
- St Augustine's Catholic Church, Melbourne CBD, Australia.

== See also ==
- St. Augustine Catholic Church and Cemetery (disambiguation)
- St. Augustine's Church (disambiguation)
- St Augustine's Abbey (disambiguation)
- Cathedral of Saint Augustine (disambiguation)
