= Pacelli High School (Austin, Minnesota) =

Pacelli Catholic Schools

Location
- 311 4th Street NW; Austin, (Mower County), Minnesota 55912; United States; 43°40′7″N 92°58′46″W

Information
- Type: Private, Coeducational
- Religious affiliation: Roman Catholic
- Established: 1913
- Principal: Robyn Bickler
- Grades: PreK-12
- Colors: Green and White
- Fight song: Minnesota Rouser
- Athletics conference: Southeast Conference
- Team name: Shamrocks
- Accreditation: North Central Association of Colleges and Schools
- Website: www.pacellischools.org

Pacelli Catholic Schools is a private, Roman Catholic PreK-12th grade school system with year-round child care in Austin, Minnesota. It is located in the Roman Catholic Diocese of Winona–Rochester.

== Background ==
Pacelli High School is named after Pope Pius XII, born Eugenio Maria Giuseppe Giovanni Pacelli. Pacelli is the only Catholic school system in Mower County, Minnesota offering all day child care, preschool, all day every day kindergarten, and a PreK-12th grade educational experience.

== Athletics ==
Pacelli is a member of the Minnesota State High School League and participates in a wide variety of sports and activities. Pacelli and Lyle Co-op for many sports including Volleyball, Basketball, Golf, Softball, Track, Baseball, and Football. Pacelli and Austin High Co-op for Boys Soccer, Boys Hockey, Boys Tennis, and Wrestling. Cross Country, Girls Tennis, and Cheerleading are Pacelli sports that do not Co-op with other teams. Because Pacelli is a small school, almost all of the students are involved in at least one sport or other extracurricular activity.

== Faith ==
The education offered through the Pacelli Catholic Schools is a flexible program that integrates the academic, cultural, physical, and spiritual development of its students. Students attend mass one day per week at St. Augustine's Church, and many theology courses are available. Although it is a Catholic school, Pacelli accepts students of many different religious backgrounds.
