= Patrick Geoghegan =

Irish Roman Catholic clergyman (1805–1864)

The Right Reverend Patrick Geoghegan O.F.M.
- 1st Bishop of Goulburn
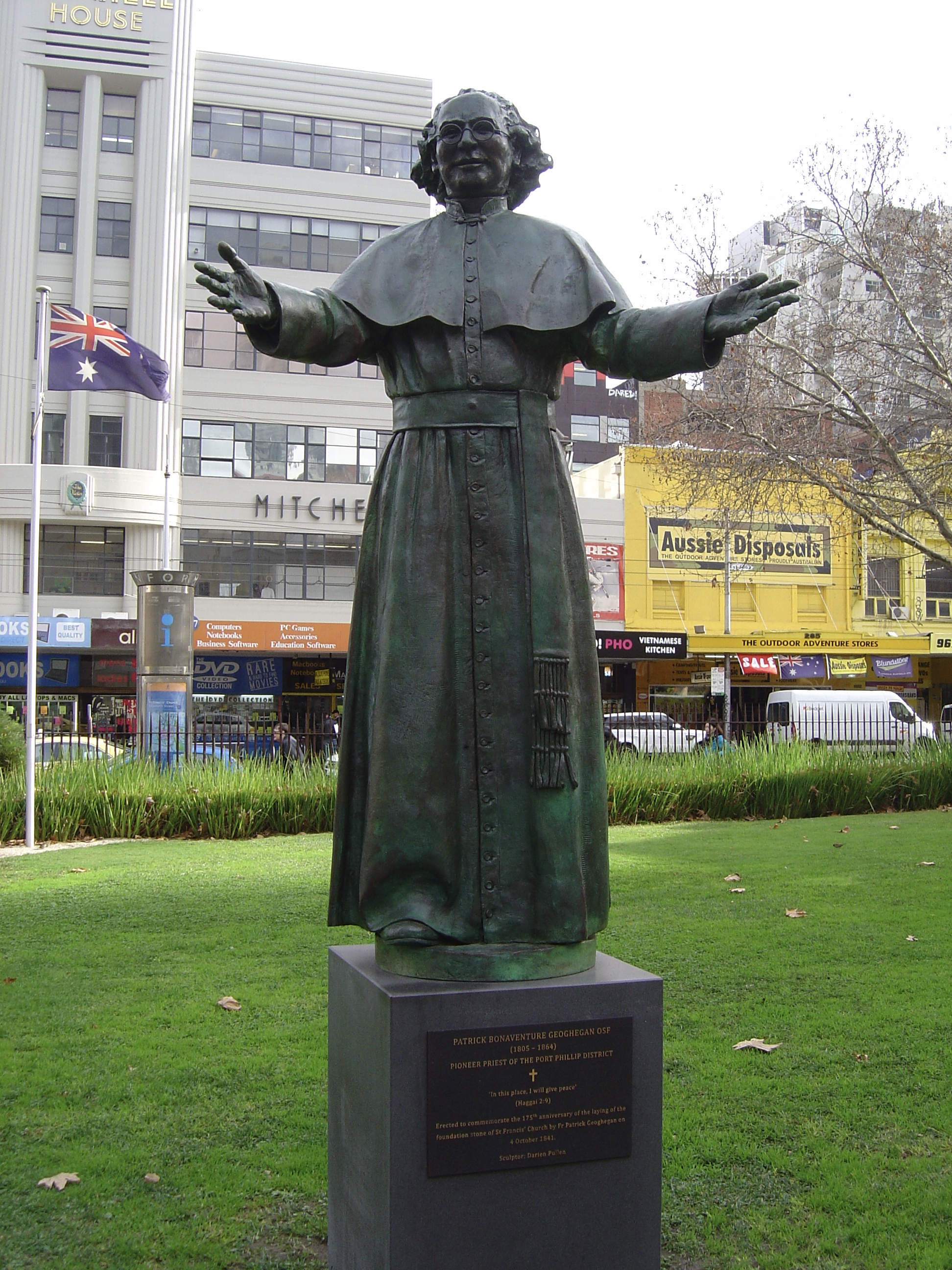
- Statue of Bishop Geoghegan erected outside St Francis' Church, Melbourne
- Church: Catholic Church
- Province: Sydney
- See: Goulburn
- Appointed: 12 March 1864
- Predecessor: position established
- Successor: William Lanigan
- Previous post: Bishop of Adelaide (1859-1864)

Orders
- Ordination: 25 April 1835, Lisbon, Portugal
- Consecration: 8 September 1859, Melbourne, Colony of Victoria by John Bede Polding, Archbishop of Sydney

Personal details
- Born: Patrick Geoghegan; 17 March 1805 Dublin, Ireland
- Died: May 9, 1864 (aged 59) Kingstown, Ireland
- Buried: Church of the Immaculate Conception, Dublin
- Denomination: Roman Catholic

Styles of Patrick Geoghegan
- Reference style: The Right Reverend
- Spoken style: My Lord
- Religious style: Bishop

Patrick Bonaventure Geoghegan, O.F.M. (1805–1864) was an Irish Roman Catholic clergyman who served firstly as Bishop of Adelaide. Born in Dublin, he became a Franciscan friar and served at a Dublin parish before volunteering for Australia. After five years as Bishop of Adelaide, He returned to Ireland, intending to stay only briefly. He was named Bishop of Goulburn, Australia, but died before he could assume the post.

Geoghegan built St Francis' Church, Melbourne, the earliest surviving Catholic church in Victoria (Australia). A memorial tablet marks his grave in the Church of the Immaculate Conception in Dublin; and there is a statue of Bishop Geoghegan outside St. Francis Church in Melbourne.

== Life ==
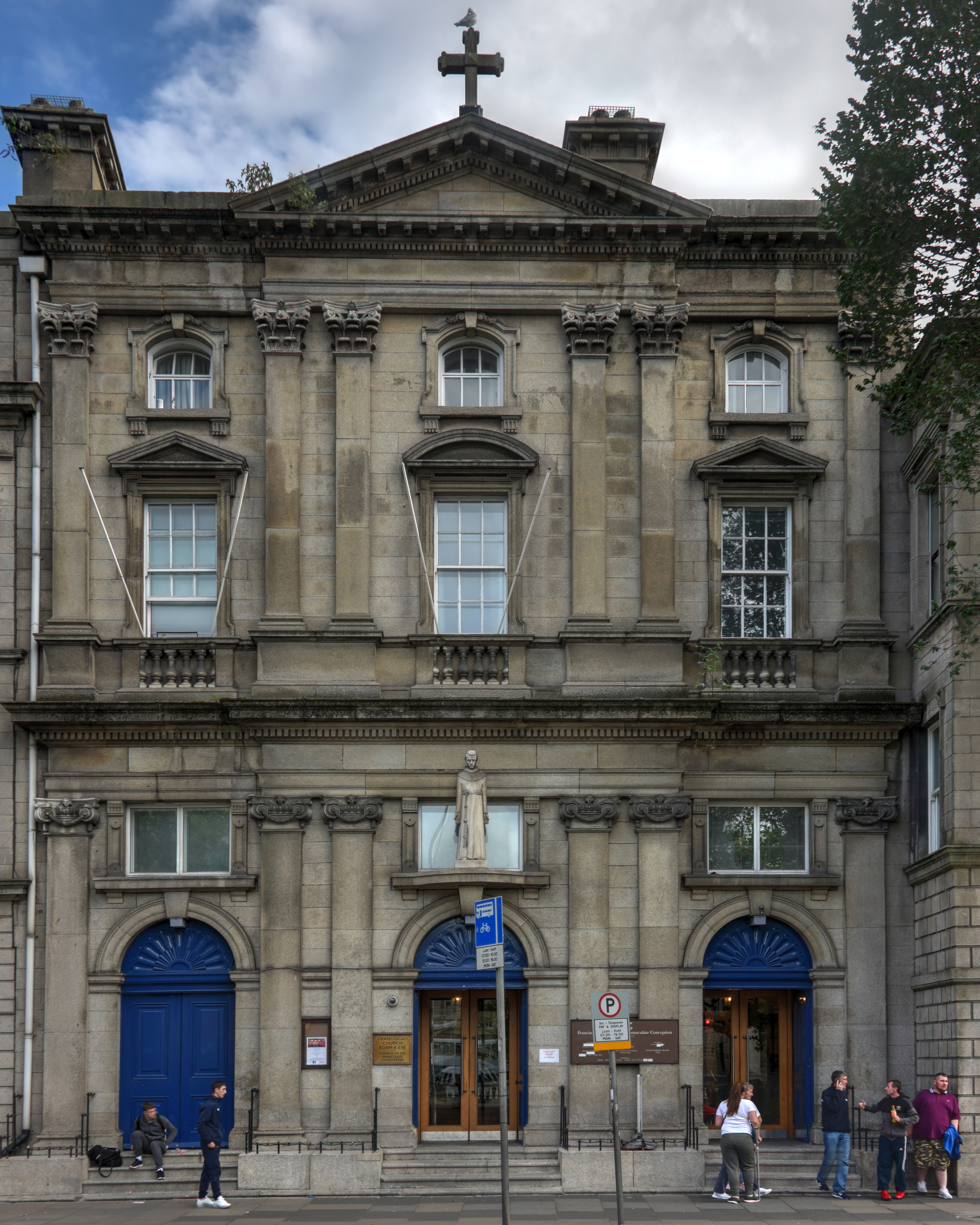
Church of the Immaculate Conception, Dublin, formerly St. Francis, (popularly Adam and Eve's)

Born in Dublin, Ireland, he was baptised on 17 March 1805. Orphaned at the age of 8, non-Catholic relatives of his father first sent him to a Protestant institution, before a Franciscan priest temporarily placed him in an orphanage. The Franciscans later sent him to school in Edgeworthstown, County Longford, Ireland. At the age of sixteen he entered St. Patrick's College, Lisbon. He was professed as a member of the Order of Friars Minor at Coimbra on 21 February 1830 as Friar Bonaventure, and ordained to the priesthood on 25 April 1835.

Geoghegan was assigned to Adam and Eve's Church, on Merchants Quay, Dublin, where he had earlier served as an altar boy. In 1836 Bede Polding, vicar apostolic for New Holland, sent his vicar general, William Ullathorne, to Britain to recruit more priests, preferably Benedictines. While in England, Ullathorne also visited Ireland, where he met Geoghegan, who volunteered for seven years work in Australia.

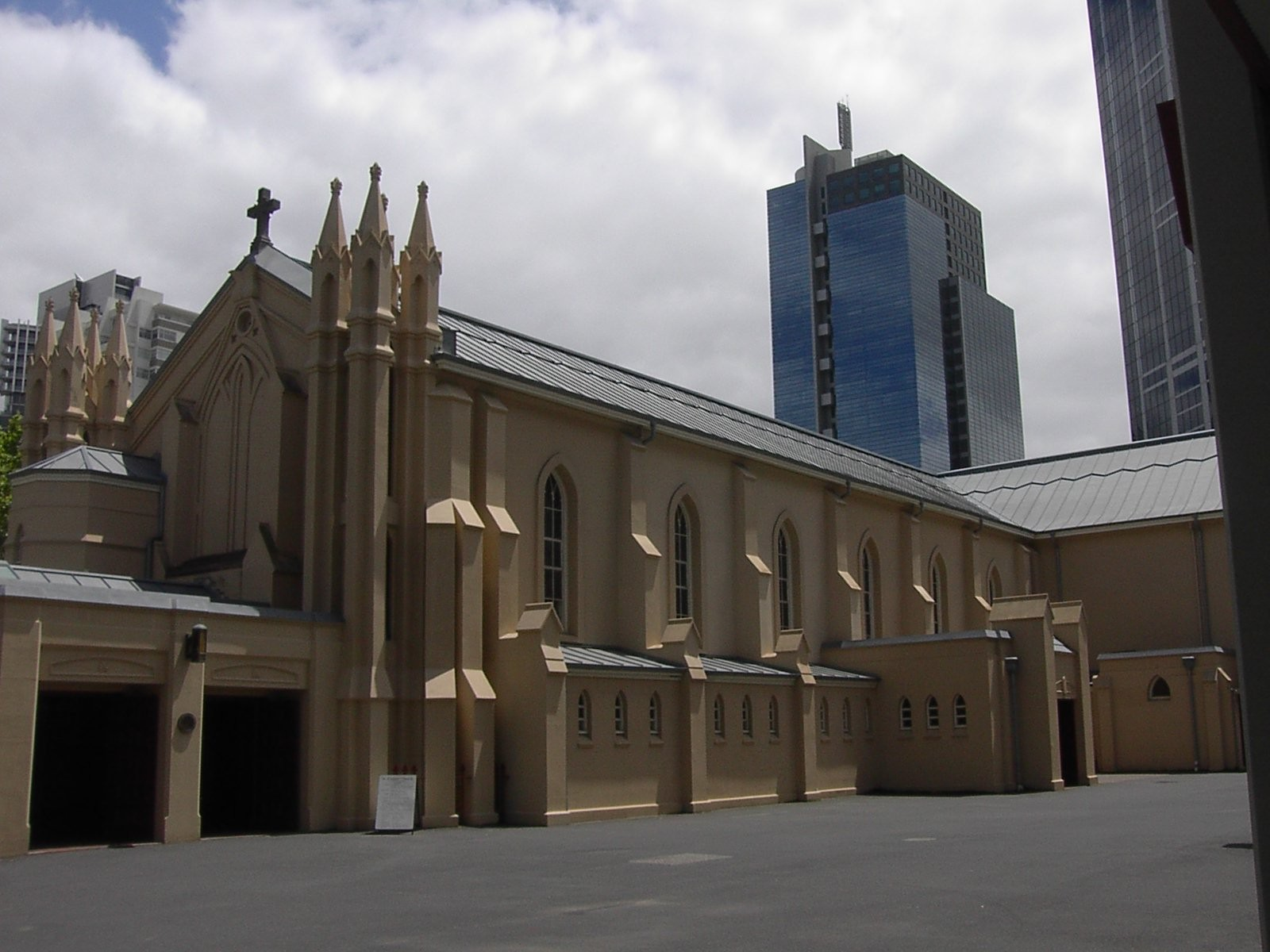
St Francis Catholic Church, Melbourne, Australia

In December 1838, Geoghegan arrived in New South Wales, where he spent some time before Polding appointed him first resident priest at Port Phillip. He landed at Williamstown aboard the Paul Pry on May 15, 1839. Given the poverty of the area, the residents hesitated to invite the priest to lodge at one of their poor houses. Geoghegan was undismayed and initially slept on a pallet set on beer barrels in the bar of a public house.

Soon after his arrival at Port Phillip (now Melbourne) Geoghegan praised Catherine Coffey for her initiative and for her “care and zeal” in conducting the first Catholic school in Melbourne and teaching children the catechism in the absence of a priest. She donated a wooden box to act as an altar at his first mass.

With a priest at Port Phillip, the number of Catholics in the area attending services increased, and the small weather-board chapel the people had been using for prayer, proved insufficient. The church, designed by Samuel Jackson, was commissioned by Geoghegan shortly after his arrival. The foundation stone was laid on 4 October 1841, the feast day of St Francis of Assisi, to whom the church is dedicated, and the completed church blessed on 23 October 1845. Saint Mary MacKillop, founder of the Sisters of St Joseph of the Sacred Heart, was baptized and confirmed at St Francis' Church The first Solemn High Mass was celebrated on 17 March 1843, which was also the occasion of the first St. Patrick's Day parade which walked in procession from the Royal Hotel to the church.

In 1846, he laid the foundation stone of St. Mary's Church in Geelong, which replaced a small wooden chapel. (The church was subsequently replaced in turn by St Mary of the Angels, designated a basilica in 2004.) From St. Francis', Geoghegan attended mission stations at Brighton, Fitzroy, and Richmond, Victoria.

When James Alipius Goold was made first Bishop of Melbourne, he appointed Geoghegan Vicar-General. On the death of Bishop Murphy of Adelaide, in April 1858, Geoghegan was appointed his successor in the see, and was consecrated on 8 September 1859. The principal consecrator was Archbishop John Bede Polding OSB of Sydney, and the principal co-consecrators were Archbishop James Alipius Goold of Melbourne, and Bishop Robert William Willson of Hobart.

Geoghegan took possession of the see in the following November, and held it for about five years. In 1862 he sailed for Europe to recruit new priests. While in Rome, he was translated to the newly formed Diocese of Goulburn, now the Roman Catholic Archdiocese of Canberra and Goulburn, on 12 March 1864. From Italy he went to Ireland where following a six week illness of laryngitis he died at Kingstown from throat cancer on 9 May 1864, aged 59. Bishop Geoghegan was buried at St. Francis' Church, Merchant's Quay, Dublin, Ireland. Despite his appointment as the first bishop of Goulburn, Geoghegan never took possession of the See. Following the death of Geoghegan in Ireland, pioneering Queensland priest Fr. James Hanley was appointed Bishop of Goulburn in 1865. However, he too did not take possession and therefore the See remained vacant until William Lanigan was appointed and enthroned in 1867.

In June 2017 a statue of Fr Patrick Geoghegan by sculptor Darien Pullen was unveiled outside St Francis' Church, Melbourne.

Catholic Church titles
Preceded by Francis Murphy	Bishop of Adelaide; 1859–1864	Succeeded by Laurence Sheil
New title	Bishop of Goulburn; 1864	Succeeded by William Lanigan
