= St Augustine's Abbey (disambiguation) =

St Augustine's Abbey is a UNESCO World Heritage Site in Canterbury.

St Augustine's Abbey may also refer to:

- St Augustine's Abbey, Bristol
- St Augustine's Abbey, Chilworth
- St Augustine's Abbey, Ramsgate
- St Augustine's House, Oxford (Michigan)

== See also ==
- St. Augustine's Church (disambiguation)
- St. Augustine Catholic Church (disambiguation)
- St. Augustine Catholic Church and Cemetery (disambiguation)
- Cathedral of Saint Augustine (disambiguation)
- St. Augustine's College (disambiguation)
