= St. Augustine Academy (Lakewood, Ohio) =

Defunct high school in Ohio, United States

- Lakewood, Cuyahoga County, Ohio; United States

Information
- Religious affiliation: Catholicism
- Established: 1921
- Closed: 2005
- Gender: Girls
- Enrollment: 640 (1963)

St. Augustine Academy was an all-female Catholic high school located in Lakewood, Ohio. The school closed in 2005, and is now Lakewood Catholic Academy, a school for grades pre-kindergarten through 8 that merged schools at St. James, St. Luke, and St. Clement (all from Lakewood).

== History ==
Saint Augustine Academy was founded in 1921 as a novitiate high school affiliated with the Catholic University of America. The elementary school, grades one through six began in 1925. In 1926 grades 7—9 were added and thus began an all girls’ high school celebrating its first graduation in 1930.

In 1946 when the elementary school was discontinued and both buildings began to serve the growing high school population. Fifteen years later in 1961, there were 418 students enrolled in a school that could accommodate only 300.

In August 1961 the Diocesan school board suggested that the school be enlarged. Reverend Mother Roberta, CSA and her Council decided to accept the offer of the Cleveland Diocese to assist in financing an expansion program.

The two existing buildings were to be linked, the auditorium expanded and new educational needs addressed. Construction began in July 1962 and was completed in November 1963, although the main school wing was ready for use in August 1963. Six hundred and forty students were enrolled.

The new construction at Saint Augustine Academy provided special purpose rooms to address educational needs:

1. A four-unit science department consisting of a lecture room with a demonstration table, chemistry, biology, and physics laboratories, each with a storage room and an office for the department head.

2. A three—unit business department that included a typing room with 40 stations, an office practice room and a stenography classroom.

3. A two-unit home economics department with a foods and clothing lab and large storage room.

4. A single unit art department.

5. A two-unit music department with orchestra and choral room and four individual practice rooms and two large storage rooms.

6. A dramatic arts room adjacent to the stage with an attached prop room.

7. A gym locker room with 12 individual showers and 1,000 small gym lockers.

8. A language lab with 36 stations was built in a room that was the chapel in the original building.

9. A 9-room administration unit which included the following: a faculty room for a priest, a student clinic, a two room guidance department, a large general office for the principal, assistant principal, and treasurer.

10. A modern chapel that could seat 72.

11. A gym that could seat 784.

12. A cafeteria that could accommodate 500 and a large modern kitchen.

13. A library (formerly the cafeteria> that could seat 101.

== Notable alumni ==
- Patricia Heaton, actress
