= Francis Murphy (bishop) =

Irish-born Roman Catholic priest

The Most Reverend Francis Murphy
- 1st Roman Catholic Bishop
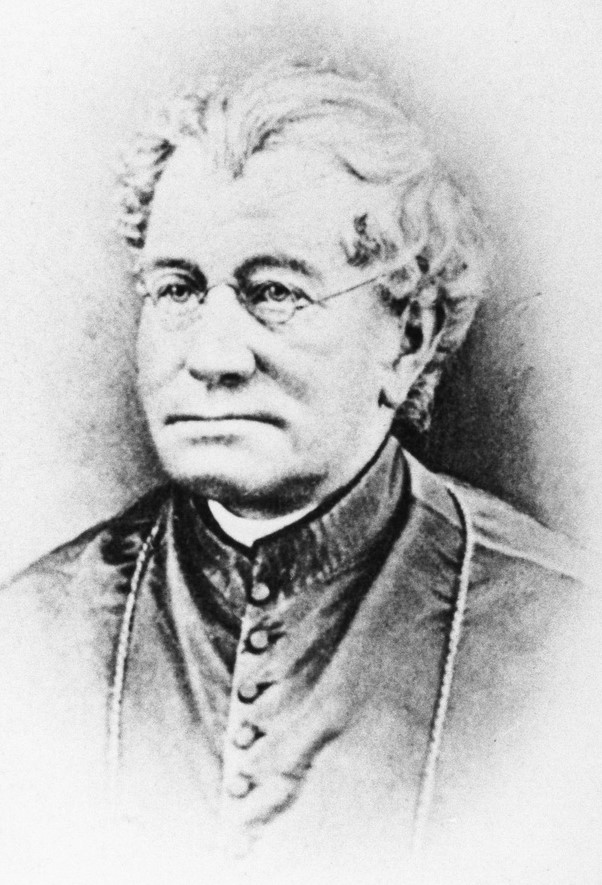
- Province: Adelaide
- Diocese: Diocese of Adelaide
- See: Australia
- Installed: 22 April 1842
- Term ended: 26 April 1858
- Predecessor: New Diocese
- Successor: Patrick Bonaventure Geoghegan

Orders
- Ordination: 1825 (Priest)
- Consecration: 8 September 1844 (Bishop) in St Mary's Cathedral, Sydney

Personal details
- Born: 20 May 1795 Navan, County Meath, Ireland
- Died: 26 April 1858 (aged 62) Adelaide, South Australia, Australia
- Buried: St. Francis Xavier's Cathedral, Adelaide
- Denomination: Roman Catholic Church
- Parents: Arthur Murphy and Bridget Murphy (née Flood)
- Occupation: Roman Catholic bishop
- Profession: Cleric
- Education: St Finian's College, Navan; St Patrick's College, Maynooth

Bishop Francis Murphy (20 May 1795 – 26 April 1858) was an Irish-born Roman Catholic priest and first Catholic Bishop of Adelaide, South Australia.

== Early years ==
Murphy was born at Navan, County Meath, Ireland, eldest son of Arthur Murphy, brewer and distiller, and his wife Bridget, née Flood.

Murphy was educated at St Finian's College in Navan, then the diocesan seminary and Maynooth College. was ordained deacon in 1824 and a priest in 1825; for four years he ministered to the Irish Catholics working at the Bradford woolen mills and for about seven years at St Patrick's, Liverpool, where he met Dr William Ullathorne who enlisted Murphy for the Australian mission.

In 1844, Murphy went to Port Phillip where he officiated at the first Pontifical High Mass celebrated in Melbourne.

== First Bishop of Adelaide ==
When Murphy began his work in Adelaide, he did not have a church, school or presbytery; and only one priest to assist him. People had gathered for Mass at private homes until Protestant businessman John Bentham Neals offered the use of a wooden store-house. Murphy continued to use the store-house until 1845. He was advised that a Mr William Leigh of Leamington, England, had purchased a number of town acres in Adelaide via his agent, John Morphett. After Leigh's conversion to Catholicism in 1844, he provided Murphy with the resources to purchase four acres in West Adelaide. Leigh also gave £2,000 to the Adelaide diocese for the construction of a church and presbytery.

The Bishop Murphy Society has been established in the Archdiocese of Adelaide to honour the generosity of those individuals who have pledged a bequest for any of the good works of the Archdiocese.

Catholic Church titles
New title	Bishop of Adelaide; 1844–1858	Succeeded by Patrick Geoghegan
