= St. Augustine's Church (Austin, Minnesota) =

Church of St. Augustine
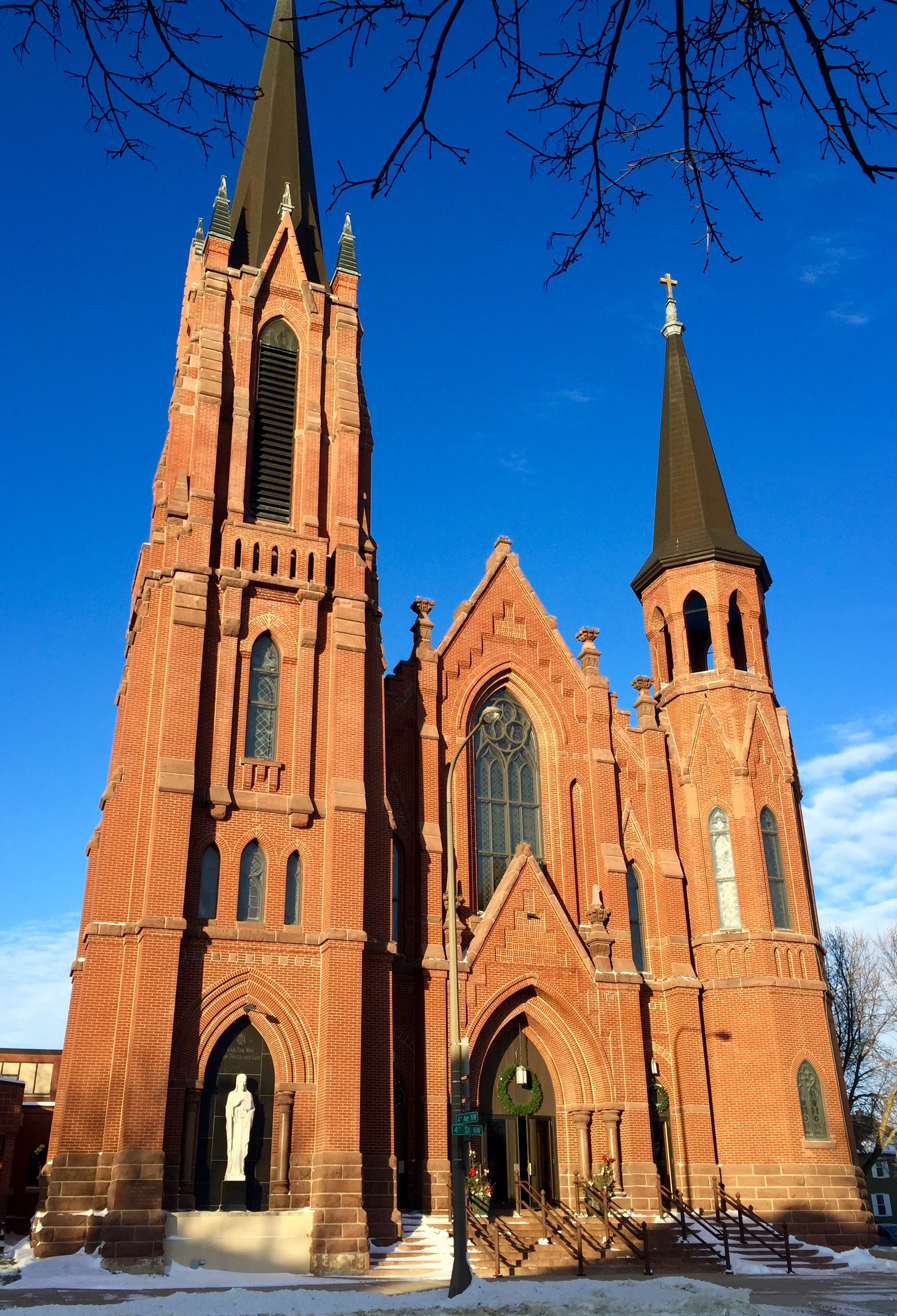
- Church of St. Augustine
- 43°40′12.2″N 92°58′47.6″W
- Location: 405 4th St NW; Austin, Minnesota
- Country: United States
- Denomination: Roman Catholic
- Website: www.staugustinestedward.org

History
- Founded: 1866
- Dedication: Augustine of Hippo

Architecture
- Style: Gothic Revival
- Completed: November 26, 1896

Specifications
- Capacity: 600
- Length: 169 ft (52 m)
- Width: 77 ft (23 m)
- Materials: Brick

Administration
- Diocese: Winona
- Deanery: Austin/Albert Lea Deanery

Clergy
- Bishop: Most Rev. Robert E. Barron
- Priest: Rev. Andrew Beerman

St. Augustine's Church is a Roman Catholic church in Austin, Minnesota, United States, located in the Diocese of Winona. Completed in 1896, both the interior and exterior have been well-preserved, showcasing a distinct Gothic Revival architecture style. The large sanctuary can accommodate more than 600 people.

== Parish history ==
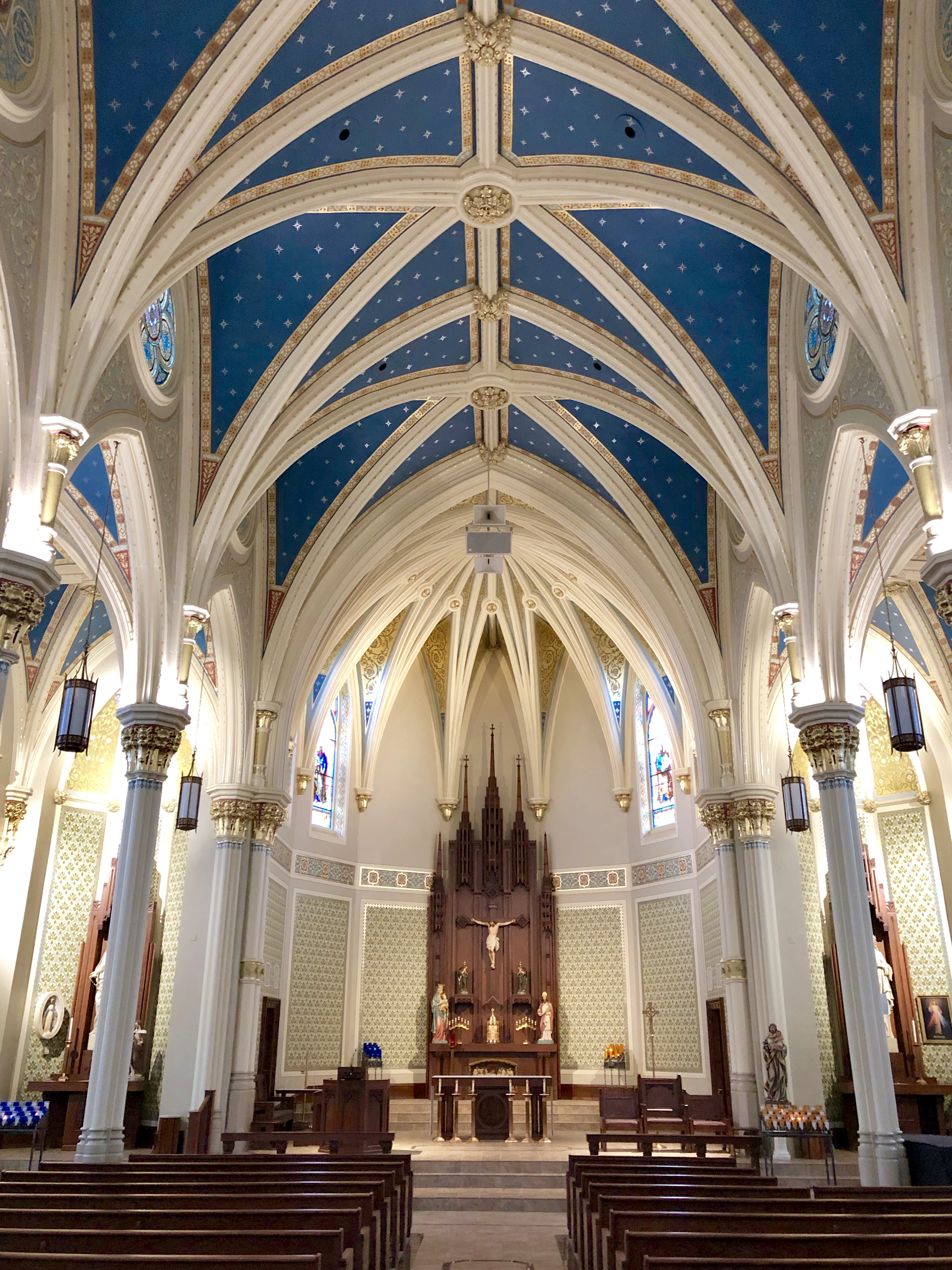
Nave and altar

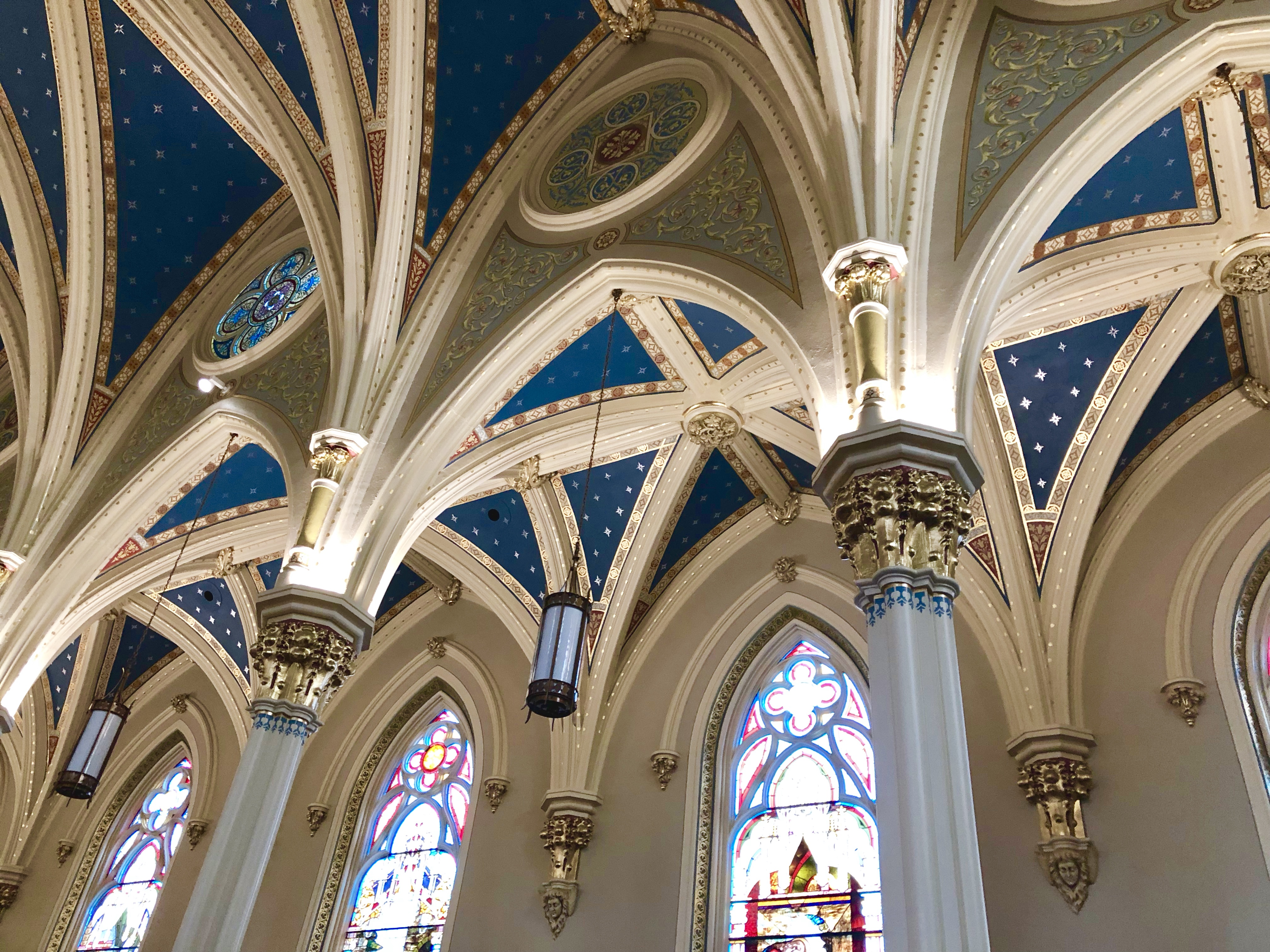
Ceiling detail

In 1857 there were a few scattered Catholic families in and around the village of Austin. On November 2, 1857, Father Michael Prendergast of Winona visited settlers in the Austin area and offered them Mass at the home of Thomas Gibson. In May of the following year he repeated his visit and again in November 1860. In 1861, Austin was transferred to the jurisdiction of the pastor of Faribault. Fr. George Keller then paid periodical and regular visits to Austin and the work of organization took definite form. Under this supervision the building of the first church of the Austin mission was begun in 1863.

St. Augustine's Parish was officially established in 1866, when the first church building was completed. Fr. John McDermott, the first resident pastor, arrived in June 1867. In June 1868, the Most Rev. Thomas Grace, Bishop of St. Paul, visited the parish, dedicated the new church (initially known as St. Austin's), and administered the sacrament of Confirmation to a group of children and adults.

The Church of St. Augustine that stands today was erected to near completion under the supervision of Fr. Daniel O'Sullivan. Bishop Joseph Cotter officiated at the laying of the cornerstone on April 24, 1894. Fr. O'Sullivan died on June 21, 1896, and the church was completed under the direction of his successor, Fr. Edward Devlin. It was dedicated November 26, 1896. The church is constructed from red pressed brick with red sandstone trim quarried at Bayfield, Wisconsin.

In 1933 Msgr. John Peschges was appointed pastor. That year, owing to the rapid growth of St. Augustine’s congregation, Bishop Francis Kelly established a second parish in Austin to be known as the Queen of Angels Church. A third Catholic church, St. Edward's, was established in Austin in 1960.

In 1935, the pastor, as well as some of the congregation, founded the Mower County Catholic Parishes Credit Union.

In 1976, lightning struck the church, causing a fire that destroyed the 140-foot steeple. Though firemen were able to put out the fire before it spread to the rest of the church, damages were estimated at $500,000.

The church underwent a major interior renovation and restoration project in 2018.

St. Augustine's is paired with St. Edward's as part of a two-congregation cluster, led by Fr. Andrew Beerman.

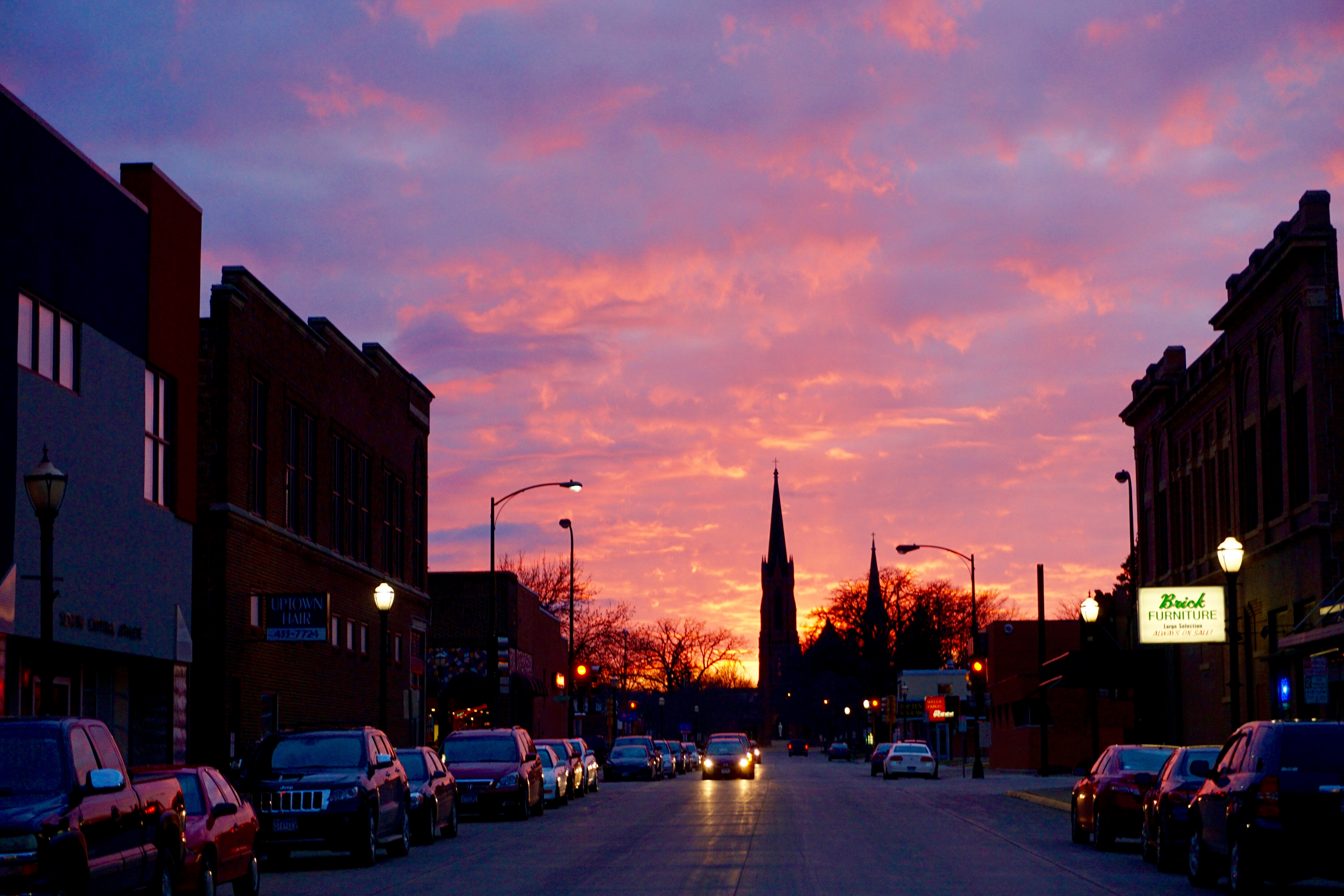
Sunset in downtown Austin, with the spires of St. Augustine's Church silhouetted, 2016.

Exterior of St. Augustine's Church in 1911

The photo of the church became an album cover for John Maus's Love Letters From Hell and Addendum albums.

== Parish school ==
The parish school at Austin was opened by the Sisters of St. Dominic of Sinsinawa, Wisconsin, in 1872 during the pastorate of Fr. Genis. It continued to grow and function successfully, with enrollment of 120 students in 1890. However, the school was closed in 1893 due to the financial burden involved in constructing the new church.

In 1909 during the pastorate of Fr. Devlin, the Columbus school, a three-story brick building, was erected to meet the needs of the congregation and was staffed by the Sisters of St. Francis of Rochester. In the 1920s St. Augustine High School was added to the parish plant. St. Augustine High School was expanded in 1951 and renamed Pacelli High School in 1957 in honor of Pope Pius XII, Eugenio Pacelli. Also in 1957, the Columbus school was torn down and St. Augustine's Elementary School constructed in its place. Today the K-12 school operates as Pacelli Catholic Schools.

== See also ==
- List of Catholic churches in the United States
- Pacelli Catholic Schools
