= Cathedral of Saint Augustine =

The Cathedral of Saint Augustine (or St. Augustine's Cathedral) may refer to several different cathedral churches, including:

- Cathedral Basilica of St. Augustine in St. Augustine, Florida
- Cathedral of San Agustin in Laredo, Texas
- St. Augustine Cathedral (Bridgeport, Connecticut)
- Cathedral of St. Augustine (Iba), Roman Catholic Diocese of Iba, Philippines
- Cathedral of Saint Augustine (Kalamazoo, Michigan)
- Cathedral of Saint Augustine (Tucson), Arizona
- Cathedral of Saint Augustine (Yamoussoukro) in Yamoussoukro, Côte d'Ivoire
- Saint Augustine Cathedral in Cagayán de Oro

== See also ==
- St. Augustine's Church (disambiguation)
- St. Augustine Catholic Church (disambiguation)
- St. Augustine Catholic Church and Cemetery (disambiguation)
- St Augustine's Abbey (disambiguation)
