= Saint Anne/Immaculate Conception Parish (Hartford, Connecticut) =

Former Saint Anne Church
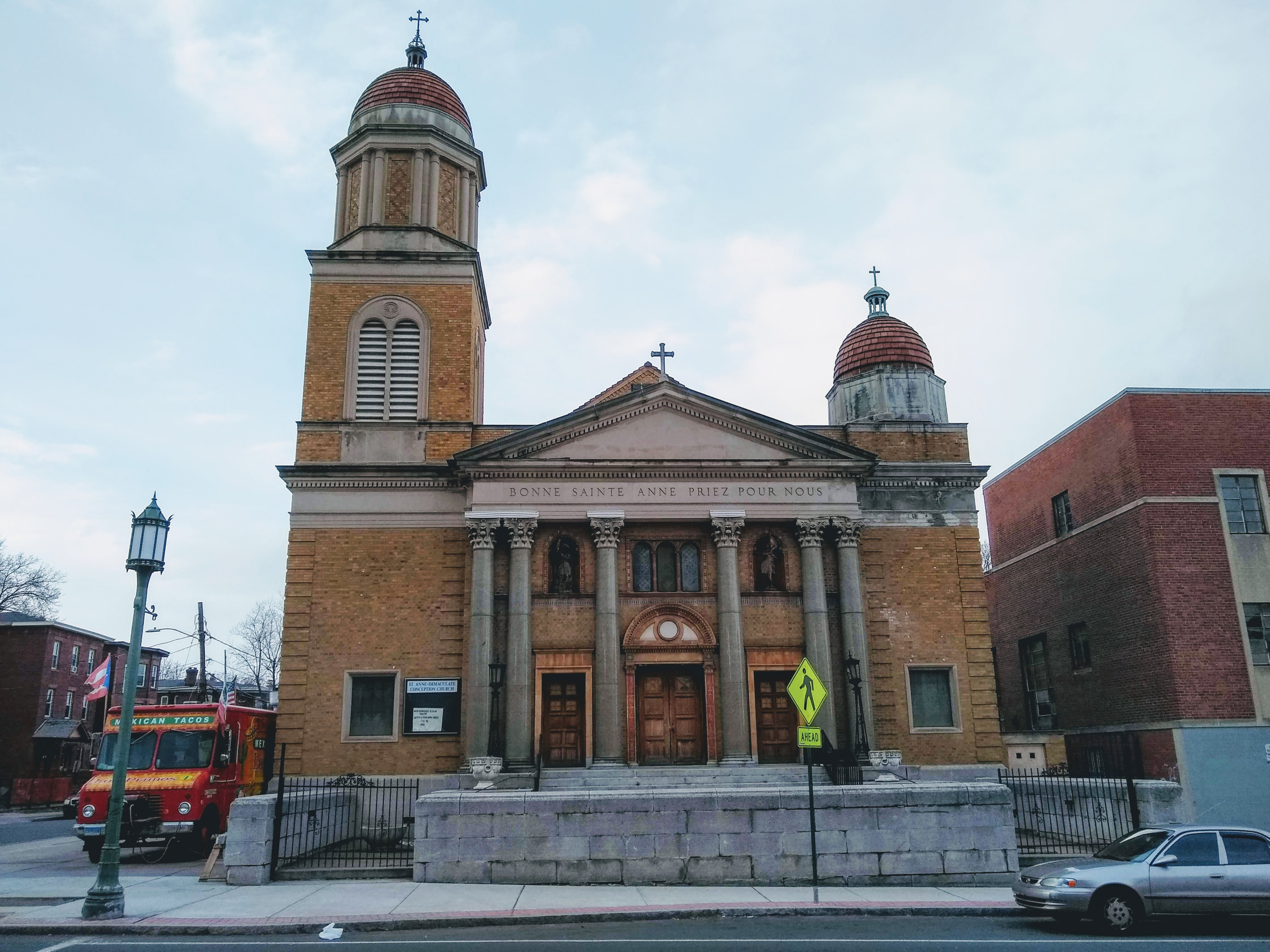
- Former; Saint Anne Church
- 41.7581349°N 72.6904385°W
- Location: 820 Park Street; Hartford, CT
- Country: United States
- Denomination: Roman Catholic

History
- Former name: Saint Anne Church
- Founded: 1888 - Saint Anne Parish; 1926 - Current Building; 2000 - Merged with Immaculate Conception

Architecture
- Closed: 2017 - Merged into Saint Augustine, building closed

Administration
- Archdiocese: Hartford

Former Immaculate Conception Church
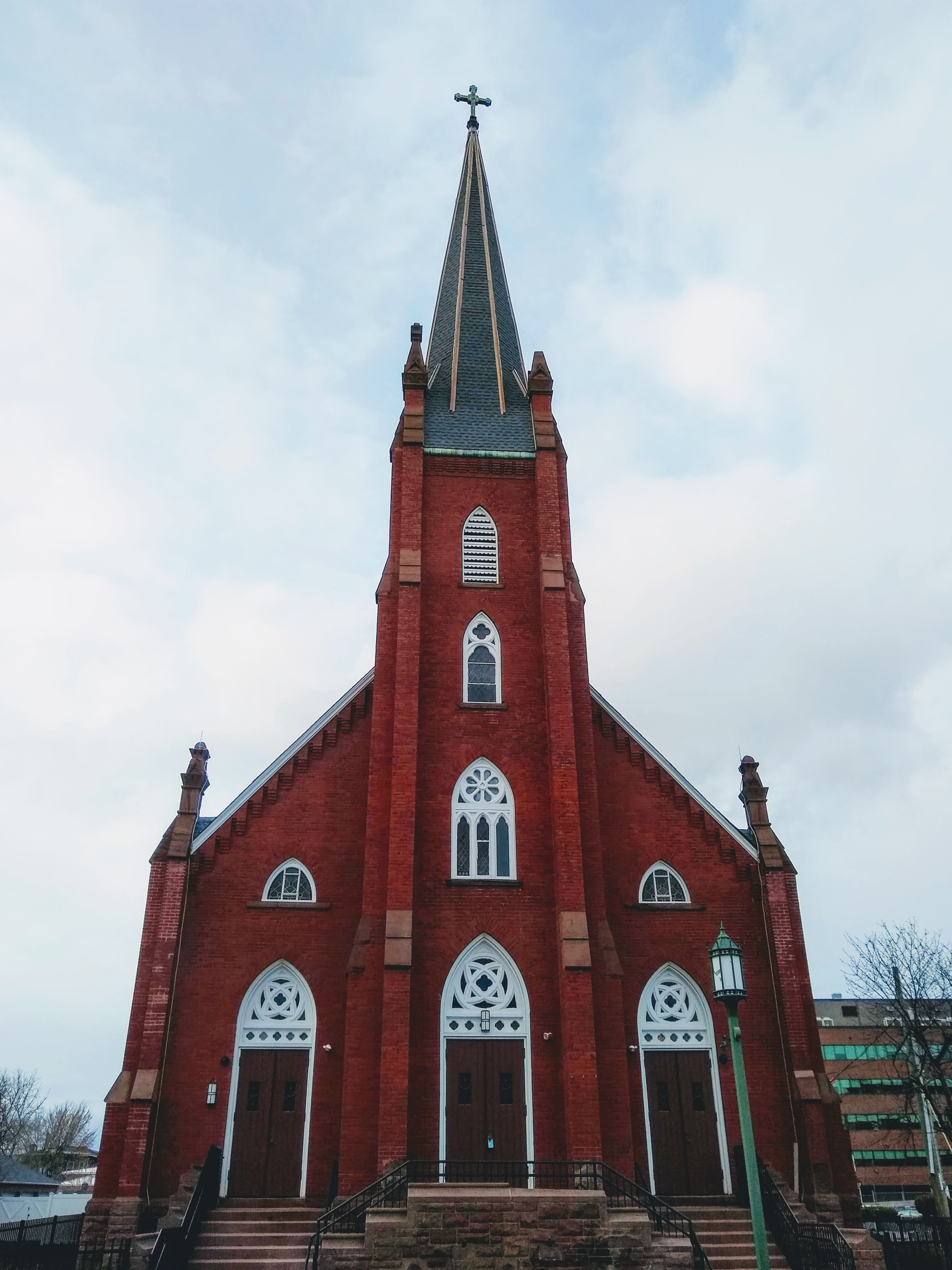
- Former; Immaculate Conception Church
- 41.7582012°N 72.6863795°W
- Location: 560 Park Street; Hartford, CT
- Country: United States
- Denomination: Roman Catholic

History
- Founded: 1894 - Current Building

Architecture
- Closed: 2000 - Merged into Saint Anne, building closed

Administration
- Archdiocese: Hartford

Saint Anne/Immaculate Conception Parish is a former Roman Catholic parish in Hartford, CT. It was closed in 2017 as part of a major restructuring within the Archdiocese of Hartford. The parish was established in 2000, from the consolidation of the former Saint Anne Parish and Immaculate Conception Parish, both of which were located in the Frog Hollow neighborhood. The consolidated parish occupied the former Saint Anne Church building; the Immaculate Conception building is now operated as a homeless shelter. In 2017, the parish was further consolidated into St. Augustine Parish (Hartford, Connecticut), and the Saint Anne church building subsequently closed.

In 2023, the former Saint Anne church building was purchased by LA IGLESIA DE DIOS. La Iglesia de Dios's previous location at 1313 MAIN ST was proposed for redevelopment by the city.

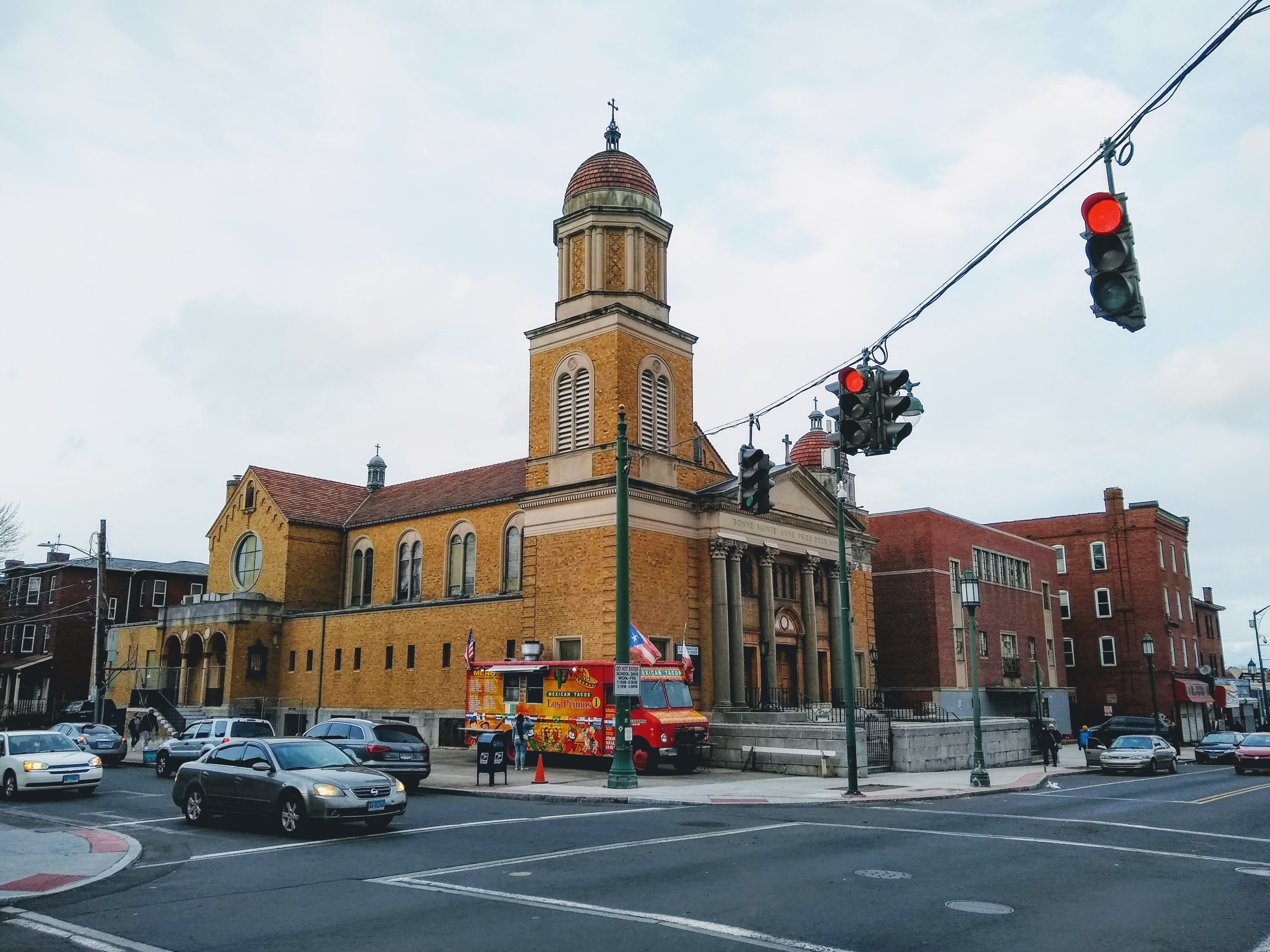
Former Saint Anne Church in 2021

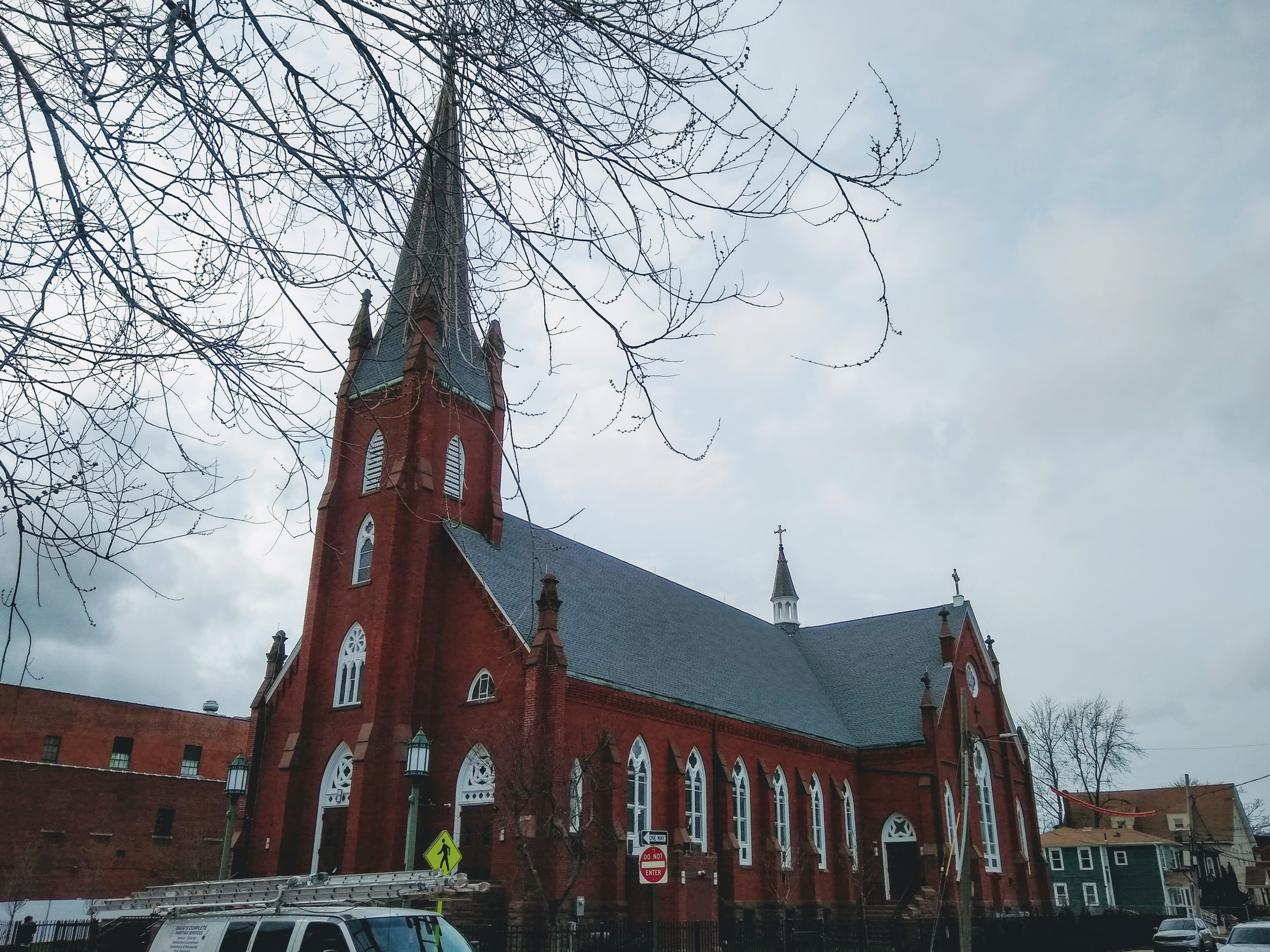
Former Immaculate Conception Church in 2021
