= Colegio San Agustin =

Colegio San Agustín may refer to the following Augustinian schools:

== Philippines ==
- Colegio San Agustin – Bacolod in Negros Occidental, Philippines
- Colegio San Agustin – Biñan in Laguna, Philippines
- Colegio San Agustin – Makati in Metro Manila, Philippines

== Other places ==
- Colegio San Agustín (Chile) in Santiago, Chile
- Colegio San Agustín (Cochabamba) in Cochabamba, Bolivia
- Colegio San Agustín (Lima) in Lima, Peru

== See also ==
- San Agustin Academy (Panglao)
- Saint Augustine Elementary School (disambiguation)
- St. Augustine's College (disambiguation)
- St. Augustine High School (disambiguation)
- University of San Agustin
