= St. James School, Ohio =

Former school in Lakewood, Ohio, United States

St. James School was a grade school in Lakewood, Ohio founded in 1912. The school closed in 2005 to merge its students into the Lakewood Catholic Academy. The church associated with St. James School closed in the summer of 2010.
