= St. Augustine's Seminary =

St. Augustine's Seminary may refer to:

== Canada ==
- St. Augustine's Seminary (Toronto), in Scarborough, Ontario

== United States ==
- St. Augustine Seminary (Bay St. Louis), in Bay St. Louis, Mississippi

== United Kingdom ==
- St Augustine's College of Theology, in West Malling, Kent

== Philippines ==
- Saint Augustine Major Seminary, in Tagaytay, Cavite
