= St Francis' Church, Melbourne =

Roman Catholic church in Australia

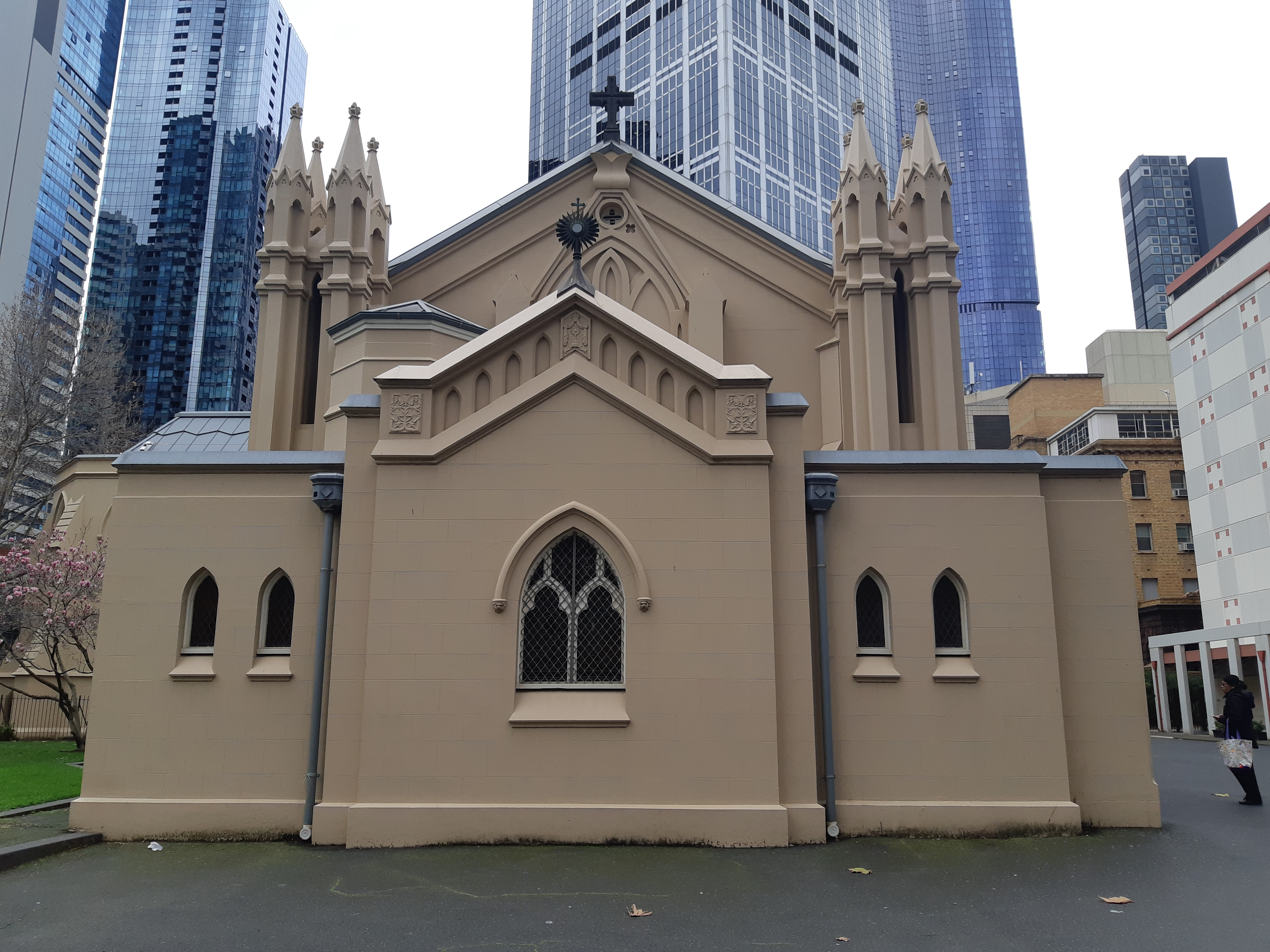
- St Francis' Church, Melbourne
- 37°48′42″S 144°57′45″E
- Location: Melbourne
- Country: Australia
- Denomination: Roman Catholic Church
- Sui iuris church: Latin Church
- Religious order: Congregation of the Blessed Sacrament
- Website: www.blessedsacrament.au/sfchurch/

History
- Status: Church (1842 – 1848); Cathedral (1848 – 1868); Church {since 1868)
- Founded: 4 October 1841
- Dedication: St Francis of Assisi
- Consecrated: 23 October 1845

Architecture
- Functional status: Active
- Heritage designation: Victorian Heritage Inventory
- Designated: n.d.
- Architect: Samuel Jackson
- Architectural type: Church
- Completed: 1845

Administration
- Archdiocese: Melbourne
- Parish: St Francis'

Clergy
- Priest: Ben Ho

St Francis' Church is a Roman Catholic church located on the corner of Lonsdale and Elizabeth streets in Melbourne, Victoria, Australia. It is the oldest Catholic church in the state.

The main body of the church (with various later additions) is one of very few buildings in central Melbourne which were built before the Victorian gold rush of 1851.

== History ==
On 28 April 1839 a committee of the Catholics at Port Philip, who customarily met for prayer in the house of Peter Bodecin, wrote to Bede Polding, vicar-apostolic of New Holland, Van Diemen's Land, and the adjoining islands, requesting a priest. Polding sent Father Patrick Geoghegan OFM who had arrived from Dublin the previous December. Geoghegan landed at Williamstown on 15 May. He was the first resident Catholic priest in the Port Phillip District of New South Wales.

The church's foundation stone was laid on 4 October 1841, the feast day of St Francis of Assisi, to whom the church is dedicated. The first Mass was held in the completed nave on 22 May 1842. Mary MacKillop (1842–1909) was baptised at St Francis' Church in 1842. The completed church was blessed on 23 October 1845.

In 1848, St Francis' became the cathedral church of the first Catholic Bishop of Melbourne, James Goold, and continued as a cathedral until 1868 when the diocesan seat was moved to the still unfinished St Patrick's Cathedral. The cedar ceiling was installed in 1850. The ornate Ladye Chapel on the west side was designed by George and Schneider and constructed in 1856-58, with decoration by Le Gould and Souter.

A new sanctuary designed by Reed and Barnes was added in 1878-9 in the Renaissance Revival style. The front porch was added in 1956, incorporating the roof of a smaller porch added in the 1850s. At different times, various Catholic organisations have been based at St Francis’ Church.

On 18 January 2017, two days before the January 2017 Melbourne car attack, the perpetrator visited the church and, uninvited, spoke from the ambo about terrorists and then left when police were called.

== Present day ==
Centrally located in the Melbourne's CBD, St Francis' has never lost its place as one of the city's most popular and widely used churches. It is the busiest church in Australia, with more than 10,000 worshippers attending each week. Since 1929, it has been a centre of eucharistic life in the care of the Congregation of the Blessed Sacrament. A monastery was constructed in the late 1930s.

The church is listed on the Victorian Heritage Inventory, with the National Trust of Australia (Victoria), and with the Australian Heritage Commission. Although there have been many changes made to the building, including the erection of a new tower, a gift from the Grollo family, to house the original 1853 bell imported from Dublin, the church remains essentially as it was designed by Samuel Jackson.
