= St Augustine's Church, Salisbury =

St Augustine's Catholic Church
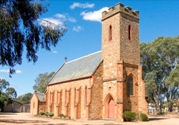
- Old St Augustine's Catholic Church, Salisbury, South Australia.
- St Augustine's Catholic Church
- 34°45′54″S 138°38′59″E
- Location: 23 Commercial Rd, Salisbury, South Australia
- Country: Australia
- Denomination: Catholic Church

History
- Status: Church

Architecture
- Architect: Walter Hunter
- Architectural type: Church
- Style: Gothic Revival
- Groundbreaking: 1851
- Completed: 1925 (bell tower)

Administration
- Archdiocese: Adelaide

Clergy
- Archbishop: Philip Wilson

Register of the National Estate
- Official name: "St Augustines Catholic Church and Cemetery (former)
- Type: Historic
- Reference no.: 6231

St Augustine's Catholic Church in the Salisbury Catholic Parish forms part of the Catholic Archdiocese of Adelaide. Located in the northern suburbs of the city of Adelaide, South Australia, the parish's boundaries roughly coincide with the limits of the City of Salisbury.

In the Salisbury Catholic Parish, there are three mass centres: St Augustine, St Finbar, the Holy Family; three parish schools: St Augustine School, Holy Family School, and Thomas More College; the Pioneer cemetery; and some parish and migrant groups and communities, as well as charities.

The Parish celebrates a biannual carnival on the eve of Lent.

== Churches and mass centres ==
The complex includes the old church, the new church, the presbytery, a school, and numerous small buildings, outbuildings and playing fields.

=== Old St Augustine's Church ===
The old building is of Gothic style and it is among the oldest constructions in South Australia. The City of Salisbury Council recommended its inclusion on the Register of State Heritage Items and on the Register of the National Estate due to its distinctive style and its landmark location on one of the main roads of Salisbury.

Construction of the church was funded by voluntary subscription, beginning in 1847. Walter Hunter was selected as the architect responsible for building the church. Hunter had unsuccessfully contended for the design of St Francis Xavier's Cathedral in Adelaide, and had designed the Church of St John the Evangelist that was then under construction in Kapunda.

Early settlers worked with bullocks provided by a man named Andrew O'Leary to cart stones from the nearby hills for construction of the church. The first foundation stone of the old St Augustine's chapel was laid on 1 April 1851, but its construction suffered setbacks, including a labor shortage caused by the Victorian gold rush. To add more difficulty to the project, both the architect and the builder died in the first year: Walter Hunter died on 19 April 1851, less than three weeks after the laying of the foundation stone, and contractor Peter Walsh died eighteen months later. The architect George Kingston supervised completion of the church by contractors Long and Co. of Adelaide.

St Augustine's Church was opened by Bishop Francis Murphy on 1 March 1857, replacing a temporary church constructed of wood in 1848.

In 1882, the community decided to buy a large bell, setting aside £80 (equivalent to GB£8,321 in 2025) for the purchase. Bishop Christopher Augustine Reynolds ordered a one-ton bell from Murphy's Bell Foundry in Dublin. The bell was blessed by Bishop Reynolds on 2 December 1883. The blessing of the bell provided the opportunity for a pageant for the local Catholic community. The bell remained in a wooden belfry at the rear of the church for 42 years. During the administration of the Rev. Fr Morrison as Parish Priest from 1916 to 1926, the church was renovated and refurnished, including the completion of a bell tower in 1925.

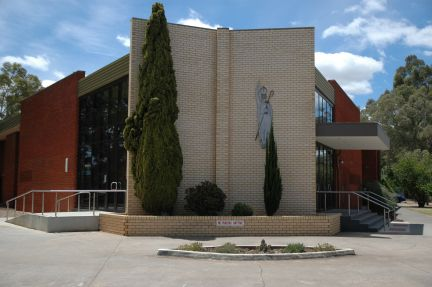
New St Augustine's Church, Salisbury, South Australia

The high altar was presented to the congregation in 1920 by Miss Nellie Sheehan of Melbourne, in memory of her parents.

Today, the old chapel of St Augustine is listed as a heritage building and historical site, and it is still used for wedding ceremonies.

St Augustine's Church was also colloquially known as ‘the Little Para,’ ‘Dry Creek,’ ‘Salisbury Plains’ and ‘Salisbury’ church.

=== New St Augustine's Church ===
The new church building of St Augustine was constructed in 1972. During the 1980s, it was also used by the Greek Orthodox community until the St Dimitrios Church was erected at Salisbury Park.

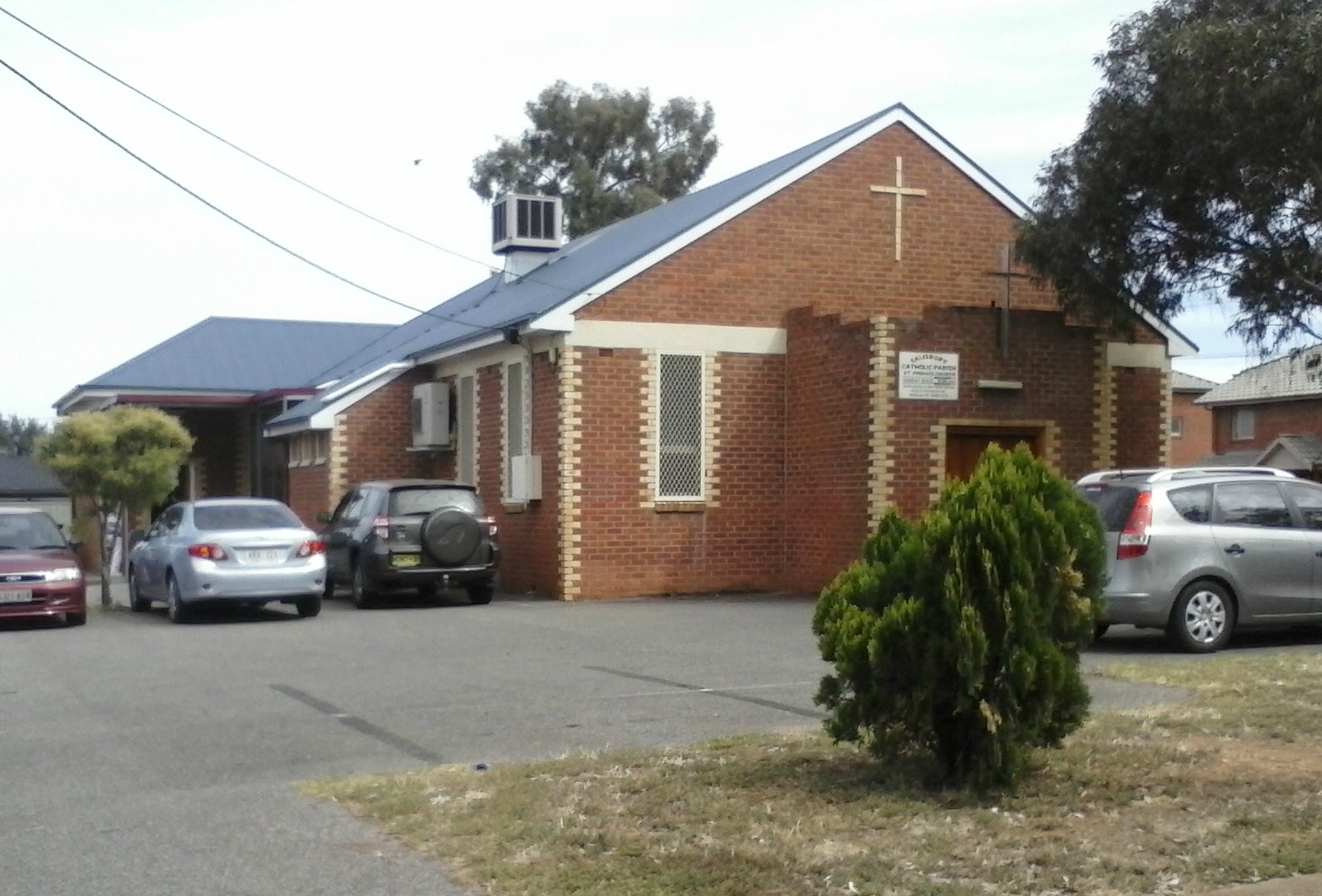
St Finbar Church, Salisbury, South Australia

=== St Finbar Church ===
This Mass Centre was built in December 1957, and officially opened by the Archbishop Matthew Beovich in 1958.

The then Salisbury Parish priest, Fr Frederick Gatzmeyer promoted the construction of this Mass Centre. His parents had donated a chalice for any of their sons that would choose to become a priest, and he was the first of three brothers that became priests. This chalice is still in use at St Finbar's Church during religious services.

=== Holy Family Mass Centre ===
The Holy Family Mass Centre is the newest mass centre, and is part of the Holy Family School complex.

== Parish Schools ==
=== St Augustine's Parish School ===
This school is located next to the St Augustine's Church and it was founded by the Dominican Sisters in 1955, and based in the St Dominic tradition. In 2004 the school enrolled over 600 students.

=== Thomas More College ===
The Thomas More College was established in 1979.

=== Holy Family School ===
The Holy Family School is the newest Parish educational centre, opened in the 1980s.

== The Pioneer Cemetery ==
The Pioneer Cemetery is the old churchyard of the Salisbury Catholic Parish. Once in the same building complex, it is now separated by Ponton Street from the St Augustine's Church and Parish School.

== History of the Parish ==
According to a heritage survey prepared by South Australia's Department of Environment and Planning, “the history of the Catholic community in Salisbury is almost as old as that of the town itself.”

Bishop Francis Murphy acquired the Leigh Farm from William Leigh in 1845. This farm at Golden Grove was part of a large bequest made to the Catholic Bishop of Adelaide and, when attending to the farm, Bishop Francis Murphy would regularly also visit the district and would offer Mass for the Catholic community. The first Catholic Mass was celebrated in 1846. By 1850, a school was opened in the area on the site of the current dining room and a bedroom of the present presbytery.

The first chapel was built of pug and pine near the Pioneer Cemetery. This church was destroyed by fire in 1855. Meanwhile, the rising community had decided to build a more permanent church made of stone. In 1851, a centrally located glebe land was acquired from the government through the efforts of Fr Ryan, the Vicar General at the time, and John Harvey, who had laid out the town of Salisbury. St Augustine's Church was built on this land.

The first priest to serve St Augustine's Church was Fr Christopher A. Reynolds from Gawler. He later became the first Archbishop of Adelaide, and a memorial window above the high altar honours his memory.

In 1869, Salisbury was severed from the Parish of Gawler and became an independent parish, with Fr Frederick Byrne being appointed as the first parish priest.

In 1916, Fr John Eviston was appointed Assistant Priest and, together with the Parish Priest Fr R A Morrison, organised the renovation of the St Augustine's Church and grounds, and also rebuilt the presbytery.

Soon after the bell tower was completed in 1926, Fr Frederick Gatzmeyer became the parish priest and served in this position until he was killed in a motor accident in 1957. He played an important part in the development of the Catholic community in South Australia. He was the youngest of three siblings that became priests and were raised by their German parents. He presided over the change from a rural to a metropolitan parish.

In 1954, the Dominican sisters arrived to Salisbury and the first part of the St Augustine School was opened.

The St Finbar's Church was officially opened by Archbishop Matthew Beovich in 1958.

When Fr Philip Marshall left the Salisbury Parish, Fr Roderick O’Brien was appointed as the Parish Priest.

During his tenure, Fr Roderick O’Brien organised the first Parish Carnivals in Salisbury as a biannual event occurring at the St Augustine's School premises. The first Parish Carnival happened in 2014.

| Salisbury Parish Priest | From | To | Comments |
|---|---|---|---|
| Fr Frederick Byrne | 1869 | 1872 | |
| Fr Charles Van Der Heyden | 1872 | 1874 | |
| Fr Charles Church | 1877 | 1879 | |
| Fr Edmund Phelan | 1881 | 1883 | |
| Fr Mark Delahunty | 1883 | 1890 | |
| Fr Thomas O'Neill | 1890 | 1896 | |
| Fr Aristide Gandolfi | 1896 | | |
| Fr Francis O'Neill | 1897 | 1914 | |
| Fr Richard Morrison | 1916 | 1926 | approx. |
| Fr Frederick Charles Anthony Gatzmeyer | 1926 | 1957 | died in a car accident |
| Fr John O'Callaghan | 1957 | 1964 | |
| Fr William Bustelli | 1964 | 1967 | |
| Fr William Flanagan | 1967 | 1974 | |
| Dean Louis Travers | 1974 | 1981 | |
| Fr Hugh O'Sullivan | 1981 | 1982 | |
| Fr Robert Egar | 1983 | 1990 | |
| Fr Philip Marshall | 1991 | 1997 | |
| Fr James O'Loughlin | 1998 | 2005 | |
| Fr Roderick O´Brien | 2006 | 2018 | |
| Fr Shibu Jacob _{MSFS} | 2018 | - - - | currently |
