= St. Augustine Parish (Hartford, Connecticut) =

Coordinates: 41.7429°N 72.6821°W

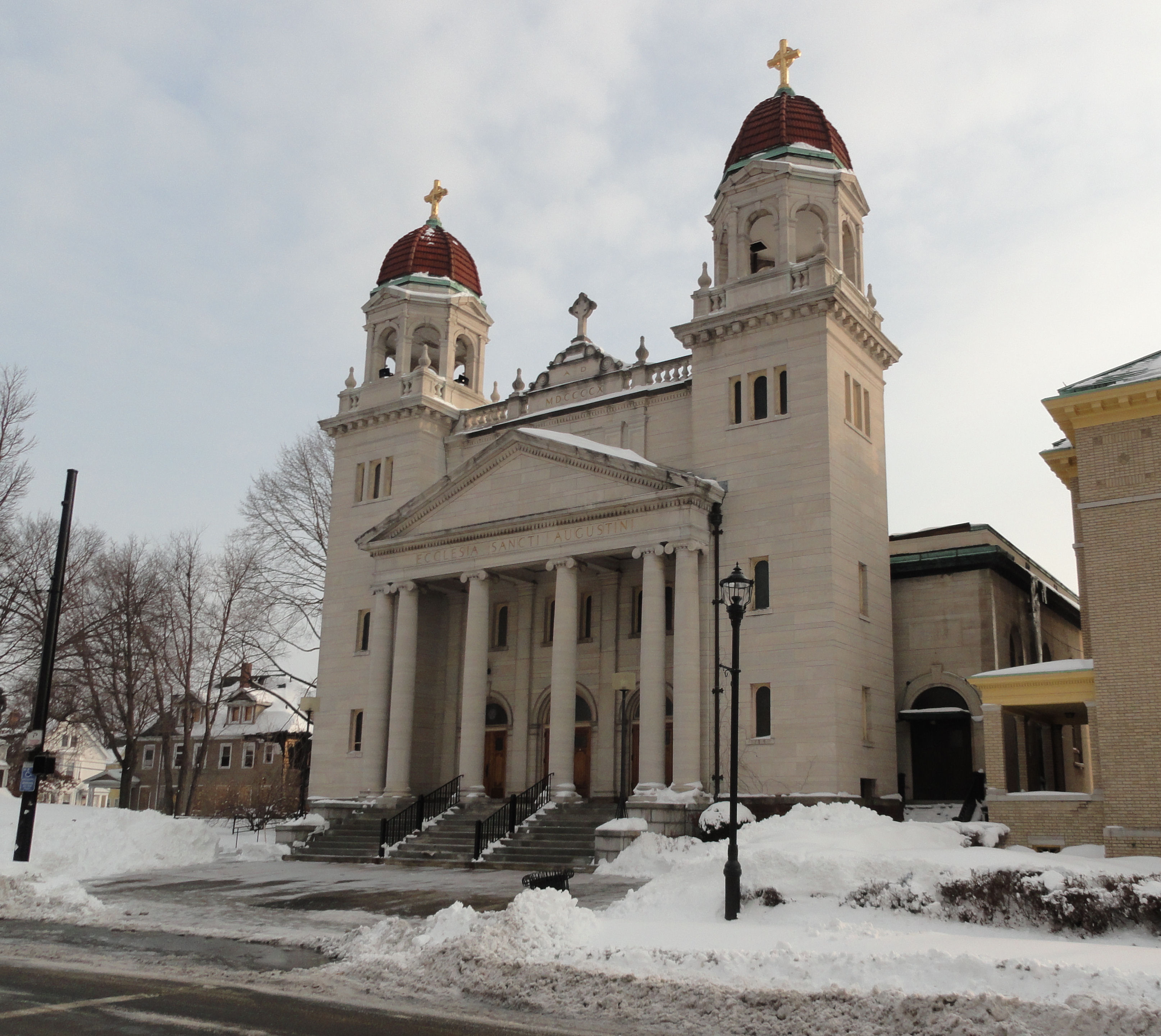
- St. Augustine Parish
- Location: 10 Campfield Avenue; Hartford, Connecticut
- Country: United States
- Denomination: Roman Catholic
- Website: http://www.staugustinehtfd.org/

History
- Founded: 1902

Administration
- Division: Vicariate: Hartford
- Province: Hartford
- Archdiocese: Hartford

Clergy
- Archbishop: Most Rev. Leonard P. Blair
- Bishop: Juan Miguel Betancourt SEMV
- Vicar: Rev. Jose Linares Pagan
- Priest: Rev. Thomas J. Walsh (Pastor)
- Pastor: Thomas J. Walsh

St. Augustine Parish is a Roman Catholic parish located in Hartford, Connecticut. In addition to a church, the parish also administered the former St. Augustine School.

== History ==
St. Augustine Parish was established in August 1902 with Fr. Michael Barry appointed as its first pastor. At that time, a church building had not yet been constructed so Mass was offered at the Washington Street School until a basement chapel was completed in 1903. The current Romanesque-style church was completed in 1912 and dedicated by Bishop John J. Nilan of the then Diocese of Hartford in June of that year. By 1928, a school had been constructed and was run by the Sisters of St. Joseph of Chambery. On July 23, 1934, the Hartford City Council named the surrounding area of the church "Barry Square" in honor of the parish's first pastor.

In 2017, the Saint Anne/Immaculate Conception Parish was merged into St. Augustine Parish. The Saint Anne/Immaculate church building subsequently closed.
