= St Augustine of Canterbury Catholic Academy =

Location
- Boardman's Lane; Blackbrook; St Helens, Merseyside, WA11 9BB; England; 53.458144°N 2.706776°W

Information
- Type: Academy
- Religious affiliation: Catholic Church
- Established: 11 October 1991
- Local authority: St Helens
- Trust: St Joseph Catholic Multi Academy Trust
- Department for Education URN: 149031 Tables
- Ofsted: Reports
- Headteacher: Giselle Lynch
- Gender: Coeducational
- Age: 11 to 16
- Website: www.staugs.org.uk

St Augustine of Canterbury Catholic Academy (formerly St Augustine of Canterbury Catholic High School) is a Roman Catholic coeducational secondary school. It is located in the Blackbrook area of St Helens, Merseyside, England. The school is named after Augustine of Canterbury, the first Archbishop of Canterbury.

Previously a voluntary aided school administered by St Helens Metropolitan Borough Council, in April 2022 St Augustine of Canterbury Catholic High School converted to academy status and was renamed St Augustine of Canterbury Catholic Academy. The school is now sponsored by the St Joseph Catholic Multi Academy Trust, but continues to be under the jurisdiction of the Roman Catholic Archdiocese of Liverpool.

St Augustine of Canterbury Catholic Academy has approximately 600 pupils whose ages range from 11 to 16 and approximately 70 members of staff. The school offers GCSEs and BTECs as programmes of study for pupils.
