= St. Augustine's College =

St. Augustine College, St. Augustine's College, St. Augustine's University or variations may refer to:

== In Africa ==
- St. Augustine's College Bulawayo, Zimbabwe
- St. Augustine's College (Cape Coast), Ghana
- Augustine University Ilara, Epe, Nigeria
- St Augustine College of South Africa, Johannesburg, South Africa
- St. Augustine University of Tanzania, Mwanza, Tanzania
- St. Augustine International University, Uganda

== In the Americas ==
- National University of St Augustin of Arequipa, Arequipa, Peru
- University of St. Augustine for Health Sciences, St. Augustine, Florida, U.S.
- St. Augustine College (Illinois), Chicago, Illinois, U.S.
- St. Augustine Preparatory School, New Jersey, U.S.
- St. Augustine's University (North Carolina), Raleigh, North Carolina, U.S.
- St. Augustine's College (Bahamas), New Providence, Bahamas

== In Europe ==
- St Augustine's and Good Counsel College, New Ross, Ireland
- St Augustine's Catholic College, secondary school in Trowbridge, England
- St Augustine's College (Kent), Canterbury, Kent, England
- St Augustine's College, Dungarvan, Ireland
- St. Augustine's College (Malta)
- St Augustine's College of Theology, Kent, England

== In Oceania ==
- St Augustine's College, Cairns, Queensland, Australia
- St Augustine's College, Sydney, New South Wales, Australia
- St Augustine's College, Yarraville, Victoria, Australia (closed 1972)
- University of San Agustin, Iloilo City, Philippines

== See also ==
- Colegio San Agustin (disambiguation)
- Saint Augustine Elementary School (disambiguation)
- St. Augustine High School (disambiguation)
- St Augustine of Canterbury School (disambiguation)
