= St. Augustine's Catholic School (Culver City, California) =

Primary school in Culver City, California, United States

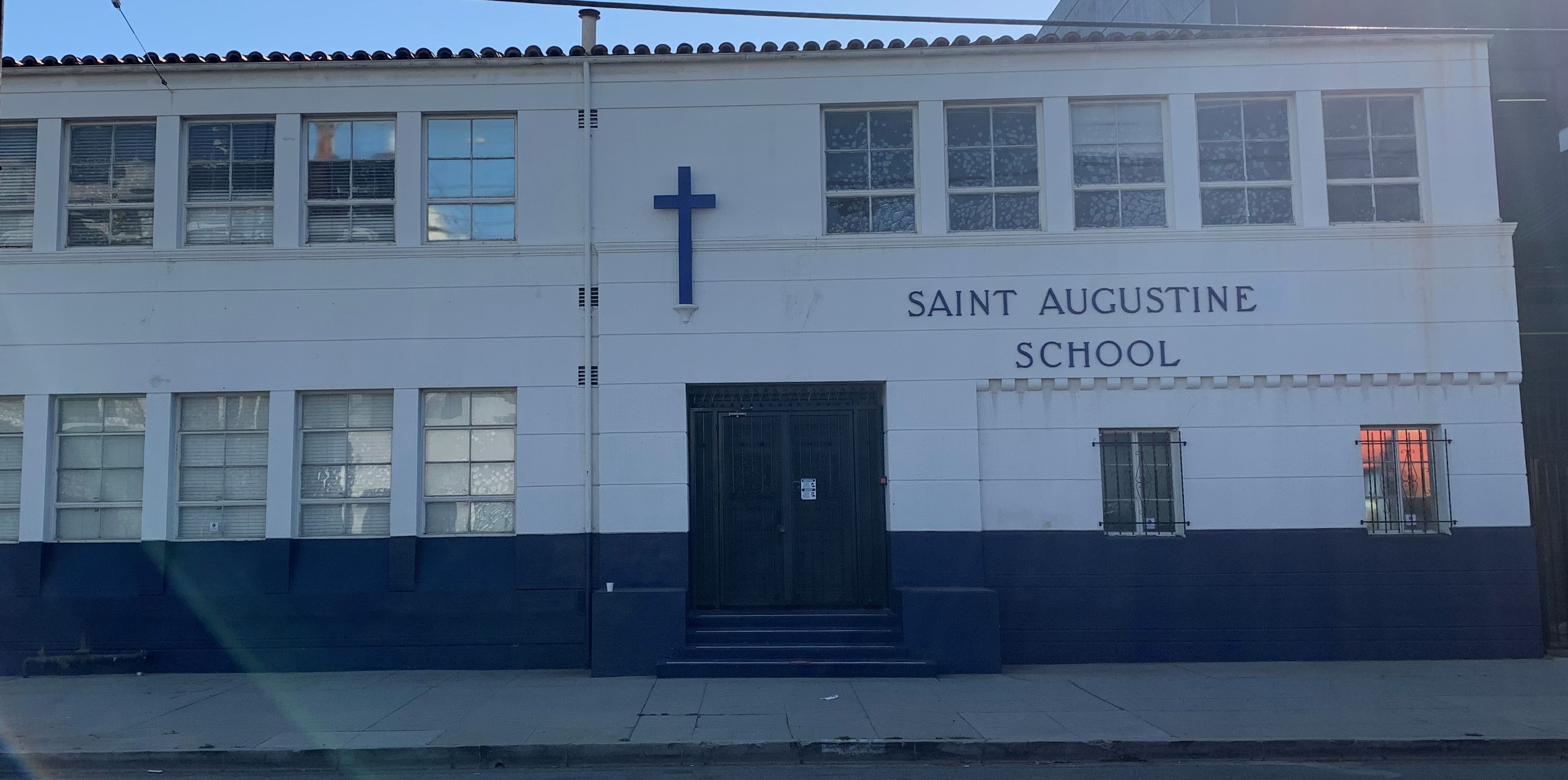

Location
- 3819 Clarington Ave., Culver City, CA 90232; United States
- Coordinates: 34°1′17″N 118°24′0″W

Information
- Religious affiliation: Catholic
- Established: 1926
- Founder: Daughters of Mary and Joseph
- Grades: Pre-K to 8th Grade
- Accreditation: Western Association of Schools and Colleges
- Website: www.staugustineschool.com

Established in 1926, St. Augustine's Catholic School is a comprehensive Pre-K to 8th grade Western Association of Schools and Colleges accredited institution located in Culver City, California, USA.

It was founded by the Daughters Of Mary and Joseph, an order of nuns, and to this day is connected to St. Augustine Church in Culver City.

It competes regularly in the St. Monica's Learning Fair and the Academic Decathlon.
