= St. Augustine Catholic High School =

St. Augustine Catholic High School may refer to one of the following:

- St. Augustine Catholic High School (Ontario)
- St. Augustine Catholic High School (Tucson, Arizona)

== See also ==
- St. Augustine High School
- St. Joseph Academy (St. Augustine, Florida) - The Catholic high school in St. Augustine, Florida
