= Spanish ship San Agustín (1768) =

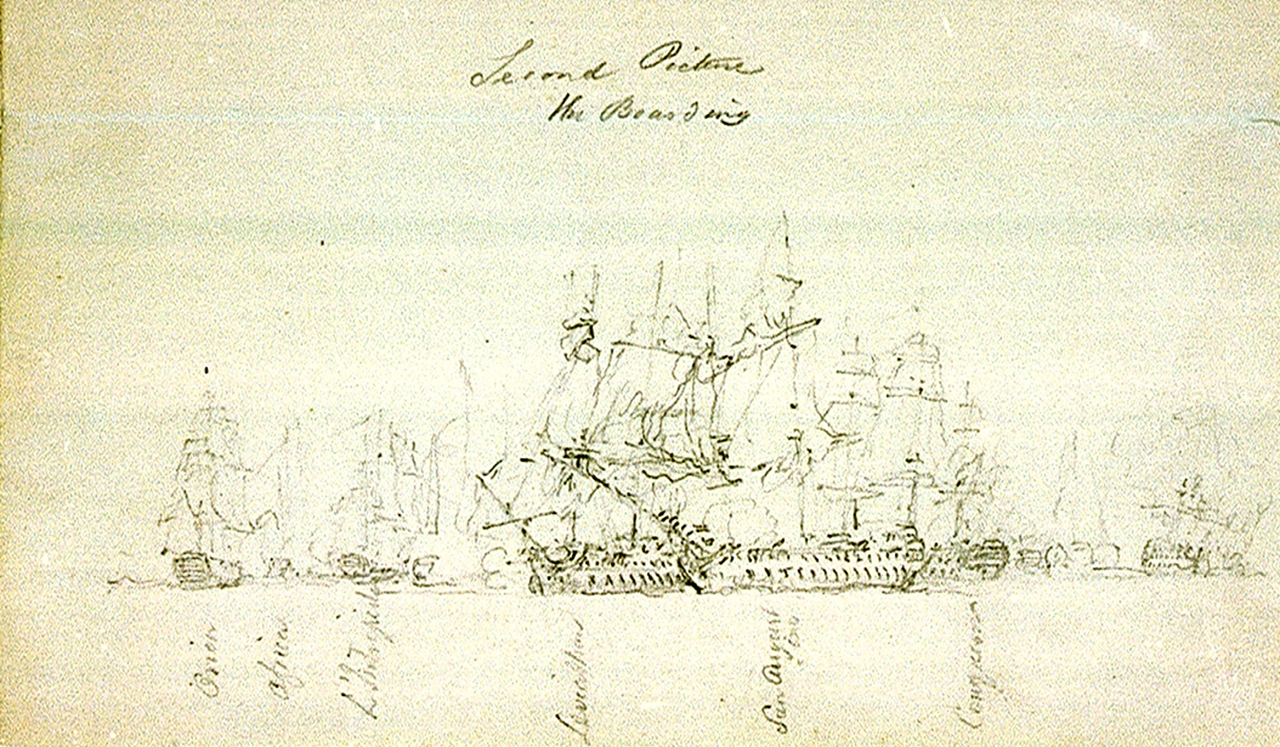
- The Battle of Trafalgar, the boarding of the San Augustino by the Leviathan

History

Spain
- Name: San Agustín
- Builder: Guarnizo (Santander)
- Launched: 1768
- Fate: Wrecked, 22 October 1805

General characteristics
- Class & type: 74-gun ship of the line
- Tons burthen: 2700 tons
- Complement: 530 officers and men
- Armament: 74 guns: Gundeck: 28 × 26 pdrs; Upper gundeck: 30 × 18 pdrs; Quarterdeck: 16 × 8 pdrs

San Agustín was a 74-gun ship of the line built at the royal shipyard in Guarnizo (Santander) and launched in 1768.

She was captured by Portugal in 1776, but returned the following year.

In January 1780, during the American War of Independence, she was part of a squadron of 11 of the line under command of Admiral Don Juan de Lángara left on patrol off Cape St. Vincent to intercept an expected British convoy for Gibraltar. But, when it appeared, the British fleet, under Sir George Rodney, greatly outnumbered the Spanish squadron, with 18 ships of the line. The result was the Battle of Cape St. Vincent (1780), off the stormy, dark cliffs of Cape Santa María through the afternoon and evening of 16 January 1780. Four Spanish ships of the line were captured and one destroyed. San Agustín and San Genaro were the only Spanish ships of the line to escape unscathed.

During the Napoleonic wars, she fought at the Battle of Algeciras in 1801 and the Battle of Trafalgar in 1805.

== Bibliography ==
- Adkin, Mark (2005). The Trafalgar Companion: A Guide to History's Most Famous Sea Battle and the Life of Admiral Lord Nelson. Aurum. ISBN 1-84513-018-9.
- Adkins, Roy (2004). Trafalgar: The Biography of a Battle. Little, Brown. ISBN 0-316-72511-0.
- Clayton, Tim & Craig, Phil (2004). Trafalgar: The Men, the Battle, the Storm. Hodder & Stoughton. ISBN 0-340-83026-3.
- Fremont-Barnes, Gregory (2005). Trafalgar 1805: Nelson's Crowning Victory. Campaign. Vol. 157. Osprey Publishing. ISBN 1-84176-892-8.
- Goodwin, Peter (2005). The Ships of Trafalgar: The British, French and Spanish Fleets October 1805. Naval Institute Press. ISBN 1-59114-824-3.
- Winfield, Rif; Tredrea, John M; García-Torralba Pérez, Enrique & Blasco Felip, Manuel (2023). Spanish Warships in the Age of Sail 1700—1860: Design, Construction, Careers and Fates. Seaforth Publishing. ISBN 978-1-5267-9078-1.
