= St Augustine of Canterbury School =

St Augustine of Canterbury School may refer to:

- St Augustine of Canterbury Catholic Primary School (Gillingham, Kent), England
- The St Augustine of Canterbury School, Taunton, England

== See also ==
- St Augustine of Canterbury Catholic Academy
- St. Augustine High School (disambiguation)
