= St. Augustine Catholic Church and Cemetery =

St. Augustine Catholic Church and Cemetery may refer to:

- St. Augustine Catholic Church and Cemetery (Natchez, Louisiana), listed on the National Register of Historic Places in Natchitoches Parish, Louisiana
- St. Augustine Catholic Church and Cemetery (Hartland, Michigan), listed on the National Register of Historic Places in Livingston County, Michigan
- St. Augustine Catholic Church and Cemetery (Trenton, Wisconsin), listed on the National Register of Historic Places in Washington County, Wisconsin
- St Augustine's Catholic Church, Salisbury, listed as St Augustines Catholic Church and Cemetery (former) on the Register of the National Estate, in Salisbury, South Australia
