= John Barry (Australian bishop) =

Australian bishop (1875–1938)

The Most Reverend John Barry
- 4th Bishop of Goulburn
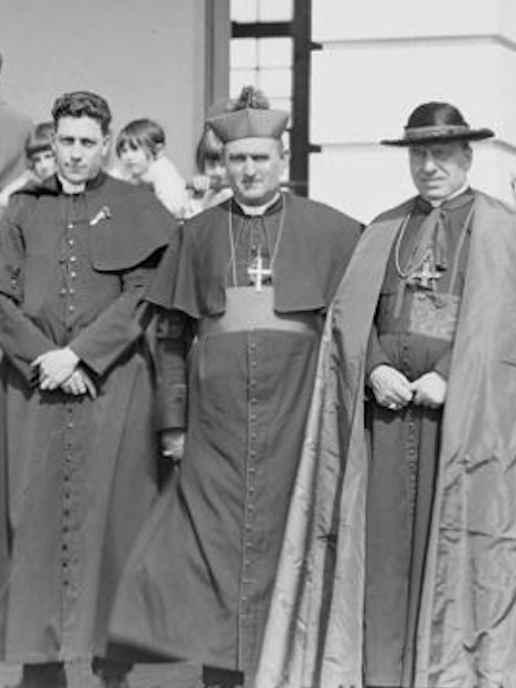
- Bishop Barry (middle) pictured at the Plenary Council of 1937
- Province: Sydney
- Diocese: Roman Catholic Diocese of Goulburn
- See: Goulburn
- Appointed: 5 March 1924
- Installed: 29 June 1924
- Term ended: 22 March 1938
- Predecessor: John Gallagher
- Successor: Terence McGuire

Orders
- Ordination: 18 June 1899 by William Walsh
- Consecration: 29 June 1924 by Bartolomeo Cattaneo

Personal details
- Born: John Barry; 18 June 1875 County Cork, Ireland
- Died: 22 March 1938 (aged 62) Lewisham, New South Wales
- Buried: Goulburn
- Denomination: Roman Catholic
- Education: St Patrick's College, Maynooth
- Motto: in fructum afferatis (To Bring Forth Fruit)

Styles of John Barry
- Reference style: The Right Reverend
- Spoken style: My Lord
- Religious style: Bishop

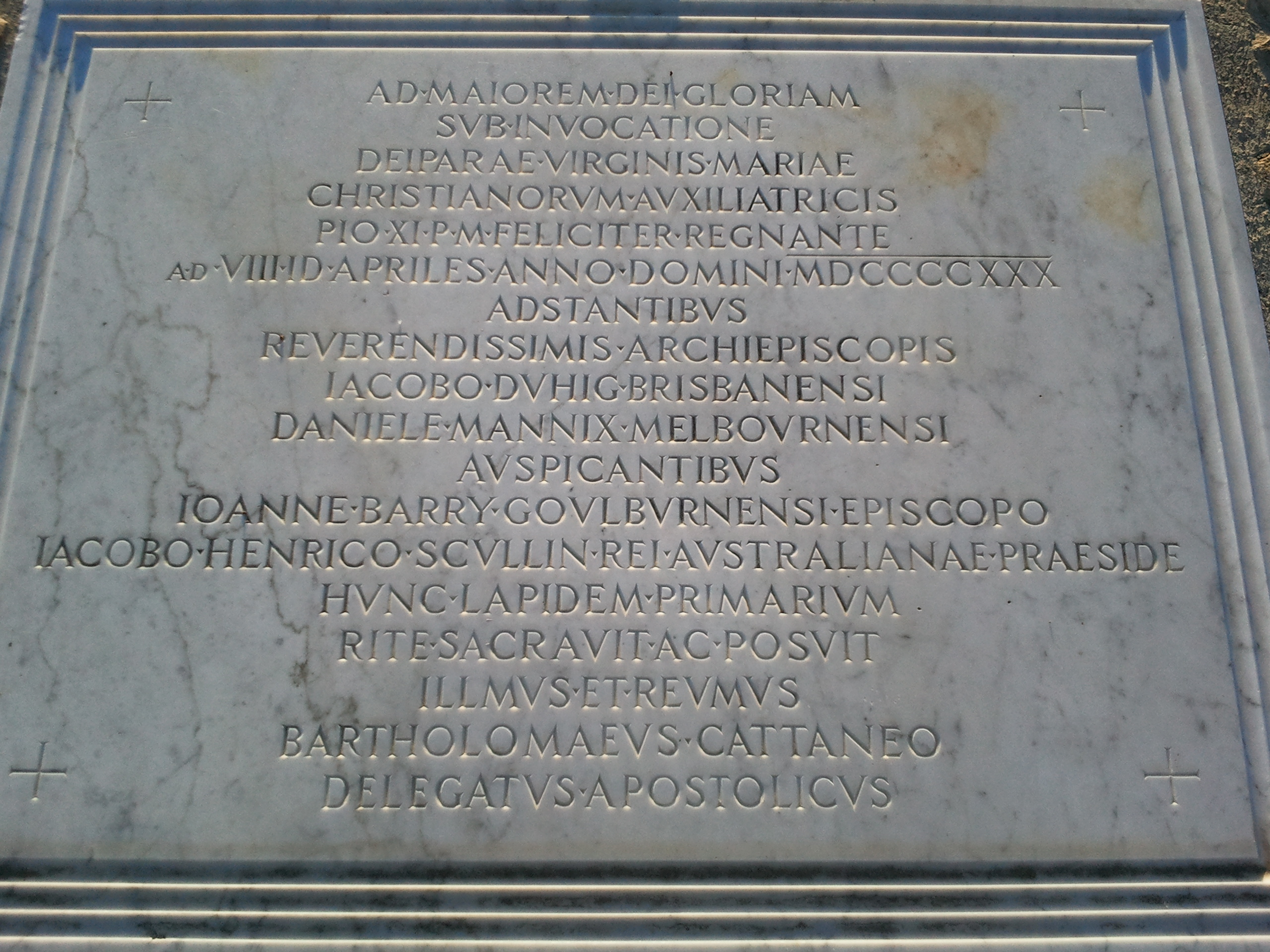
Planned Cathedral Foundation Stone noting the intended dedication to Mary, Help of Christians. The plaque includes the names of Pope Pius, Archbishops Duhig and Mannix, Bishop Barry, and Catholic Prime Ministers Scullin and Lyons (then opposition leader)

John Barry (1875–1938) was an Australian Catholic Bishop. He was the fourth Roman Catholic Bishop of Goulburn from 1924 to 1938.

== Early life and ordination ==
Barry was born on 18 June 1875 in County Cork, Ireland. The eldest son of ten children born to Simon and Mary Barry, he attended St Colman's College, Fermoy before entering the seminary. Barry Graduated from St Patrick's College, Maynooth and was ordained to the priesthood on his 24th birthday in 1899. In November of the same year, Barry moved to the Archdiocese of Melbourne, Australia. There he served the parishes of Dandenong, St Kilda East, Mansfield, and Balaclava, before being appointed the administrator of St Patrick's Cathedral in 1917. Additionally, Barry was named by Archbishop Thomas Carr as the Chancellor of the Archdiocese, a role he would continue to serve in under Daniel Mannix.

== Episcopate ==
Over three months after the death of Bishop John Gallagher in November 1923, Barry was appointed to succeed Gallagher as Bishop of Goulburn on 5 March 1924. He was consecrated bishop on 29 June by Archbishop Cattaneo, the Apostolic Delegate, at The Cathedral of Sts Peter and Paul, Goulburn. Barry was bishop for much of the early foundations of Canberra and its fledgling Roman Catholic community. During his tenure such milestones as the first Catholic school and parish came to fruition. Although a key organiser in the beginnings of St Christopher's Church (later Cathedral), he would not live to see the building consecrated. In April 1930, Barry participated in the laying of a foundation stone for an expansive cathedral to be built alongside Commonwealth Avenue and dedicated to Mary, Help of Christians, Patroness of Australia. Due to the Great Depression and Second World War, funds were unable to be raised and the cathedral plans fell into archival memory. While Barry was Bishop of Goulburn, other civil milestones were achieved for the young national capital, such as the opening of The Provisional Parliament House in 1927. Barry came to be known as a 'Building Bishop' for his work in expanding Catholic education and healthcare throughout his diocese.

== Death ==
Bishop Barry died of a coronary occlusion on 22 March 1938, after a short stay at Lewisham Hospital. Over his fourteen years as bishop, Barry had become much loved throughout the Diocese of Goulburn for his dedication and accessibility. His obituary in the Canberra Times described him as a 'great bishop' and having 'zeal as an administrator and pastor of souls'. Barry was originally buried at St Patrick's Roman Catholic Cemetery in Goulburn, but his remains were later moved after a resting place beneath the Goulburn Cathedral sanctuary could be arranged. He was succeeded by Bishop Terence McGuire, the last Bishop of Goulburn and first Archbishop of Canberra and Goulburn.

== See also ==
- Archdiocese of Canberra and Goulburn

== Bibliography ==
- O'Farrell, Patrick. "John Barry (1875–1938)". Australian Dictionary of Biography. National Centre of Biography, Australian National University.
- "Obituary - John Barry - Obituaries Australia". oa.anu.edu.au.
- "ORDINATIONS AT MAYNOOTH". Freeman's Journal. 5 August 1899. p. 6.
