= Guilford Clyde Young =

Australian Roman Catholic clergyman

- Archbishop of Hobart
- Church: Catholic Church
- Archdiocese: Archdiocese of Hobart
- In office: 20 September 1955 – 16 March 1988
- Predecessor: Ernest Victor Tweedy
- Successor: Eric D'Arcy
- Previous posts: Titular Archbishop of Cyrrhus (1954-1955); Coadjutor Archbishop of Hobart (1954-1955); Apostolic Administrator of Canberra and Goulburn (1953-1954); Titular Bishop of Heliosebaste (1948-1954); Auxiliary Bishop of Canberra and Goulburn (1948-1954)

Orders
- Ordination: 3 June 1939 by Luigi Traglia
- Consecration: 8 September 1948 by Giovanni Panico

Personal details
- Born: 10 November 1916 Sandgate, Brisbane, Queensland, Australia
- Died: 16 March 1988 (aged 71)

Styles of Sir Guilford Young
- Reference style: The Most Reverend
- Spoken style: Your Excellency
- Religious style: Archbishop
- Posthumous style: N/A

Sir Guilford Clyde Young KBE (10 November 1916 – 16 March 1988) was an Australian Roman Catholic clergyman.

== Early life ==
Young was born in Sandgate, Queensland, on 10 November 1916, the fourth of six surviving sons born to Arthur Albert and Mary Ellen Young. He grew up in Longreach and attended primary school at the Presentation Sisters’ Our Lady’s School, Longreach. He won an A-grade bursary to secondary school at the Christian Brothers’ St Joseph’s College, Rockhampton where he excelled in both sport and studies. He was affectionately known as Gillie.

At 16, he was accepted as a candidate for the priesthood by Bishop Romuald Denis Hayes and in 1933, began studies at St Columba's College, Springwood in New South Wales. At the end of 1934, he was chosen to attend the Pontificio Collegio Urbano de Propaganda Fide to continue his studies for the priesthood, having topped all of his classes. In Rome, he continuted to excel in his studies, meriting the distinction of "Summa cum laude" in his theological examinations.

== Priesthood ==
On 3 June 1939, Young was ordained a priest in the Archbasilica of Saint John Lateran by Archbishop Luigi Traglia. He had to be given special dispensation to be ordained, having not reached the canonical age of ordination of 24. Following his ordination, he remained in Rome for another year to complete a Doctor of Sacred Theology. He returned to his native diocese in 1940 via the United States, where he drove from New York to San Francisco with four Australian priests with whom he had studied in Rome.

His first appointment was as an assistant priest at St Joseph's Cathedral, Rockhampton. In 1941, he was appointed assistant secretary to the Apostolic Delegation. He served there until 1944 when he was appointed as professor of fundamental theology at the newly-established Regional Pope Pius XII Seminary at Banyo, Brisbane.

== Episcopacy ==
=== Canberra-Goulburn ===
On 15 July 1948, Young was appointed Auxiliary Bishop of the Archdiocese of Canberra-Goulburn and Titular Bishop of Heliosebaste by Pope Pius XII. The appointment made him the youngest bishop in the world and the youngest Australian bishop of all time at the age of just 31. He was consecrated in St Mary's Cathedral, Sydney on 8 September 1948 by Archbishop Giovanni Panico. He arrived the Archdiocese of Canberra-Goulburn on 26 September 19487 and took up residency in Yass.

As Auxiliary Bishop, he made several canonical visitations across the vast Archdiocese, administering the Sacrament of Confirmation in multiple parishes and gaining a reputation for his preaching.

In 1950, he travelled to Rome for six months on an Ad Limina visit. On his return journey, he visited post-war Germany where he remarked the German people did not seem to have any heart left.

On 8 August 1953, Young was appointed Apostolic Administrator of the Archdiocese of Canberra-Goulburn following the resignation of Archbishop Terence McGuire due to ill-health. In October 1953, he suggested he would likely be moved from the Archdiocese of Canberra-Goulburn in the coming months.

On 16 November 1953, Eris Norman Michael O’Brien was appointed Archbishop of Archdiocese of Canberra-Goulburn, and expressed his desire to keep Young as his auxiliary. In January 1954, his appointment as Auxiliary Bishop was confirmed.

=== Hobart ===
On 10 October 1954, he was appointed Coadjutor Archbishop of Hobart and Titular Archbishop of Cyrrhus, at the age of just 38.

Within a year, on 20 September 1955, he succeeded to the See following the resignation of Archbishop Ernest Victor Tweedy, becoming Archbishop of Hobart at the age of 38.

Young played a critical role in the Second Vatican Council, especially in discussions on religious liberty and the formulation of the Constitution on the Sacred Liturgy.

Young's years in Hobart were distinguished by his leadership in the implementation of the reforms of the Second Vatican Council and his contribution to the liturgical renewal of the Church, both at the local level and through his appointments in Rome, first to the papal commission for the implementation of the Sacrosanctum Concilium, and later to the Sacred Congregation for Divine Worship. He would spend more than 30 years as Archbishop of Hobart.

He had been a prominent advocate for state aid for Catholic schools during his time in Canberra-Goulburn and continued this crusade in Hobart. Over he episcopacy, he opened 28 new Catholic schools, extended 22 others, oversaw the establishment of the University of Tasmania’s St John Fisher College, established the Catholic Education Office and the Schools Provident Fund.

He was also forced to deal with a range of challenges, including a crisis in the Catholic education system, the effects of postwar migration that brought a need to build new churches, a lack of candidates coming forward for ordination to the priesthood, and the perceived spiritual supineness of prominent Catholic lay people.

== Death ==
On 16 March 1988, Young died in Parkville, Melbourne at the age of 71 after having undergone surgery for a damaged aorta.

== Honours ==
In the Queen's Birthday Honours of 1978, Archbishop Young was appointed a Knight Commander of the Order of the British Empire (KBE).

Preceded by Ernest Tweedy	Archbishop of Hobart; 1955–1988	Succeeded by Eric D'Arcy
