= Augustin-Joseph Sépinski =

French prelate

Augustin-Joseph Sépinski O.F.M.
- Titular Archbishop of Assuras
- Church: Catholic Church
- In office: 2 October 1965 – 31 December 1978
- Predecessor: Ernest Victor Tweedy
- Successor: Reginald Joseph Orsmond
- Previous posts: Apostolic Nuncio to Uruguay (1969-1975); Apostolic Delegate to Jerusalem and Palestine (1965-1969)

Orders
- Ordination: 20 December 1924
- Consecration: 21 November 1965 by Amleto Giovanni Cicognani

Personal details
- Born: Augustin-Joseph Antoine Sépinski; 26 July 1900 Saint-Julien-lès-Metz, Lorraine, Alsace–Lorraine, German Empire
- Died: 31 December 1978 (aged 78)

Augustin-Joseph Antoine Sépinski O.F.M. (26 July 1900 – 31 December 1978) was a French prelate of the Catholic Church who led the Franciscans from 1952 to 1965 and then worked in the diplomatic service of the Holy See. He is also known as Agostino Sepinski. (Note: See, for example, accounts of his intervention at the Second Vatican Council.)

== Biography ==
Augustin-Joseph Sépinski was born in Saint-Julien-lès-Metz, Lorraine, Alsace–Lorraine, German Empire, on 26 July 1900. He was ordained a priest of the Order of Friars Minor on 20 December 1924.

In 1952 he was elected to a six-year term as Minister General of the Order of Friars Minor, commonly known as the Franciscans. He was elected in 1957 to a twelve-year term and held that position until 1965.

He participated in all four sessions of the Second Vatican Council (1962–1965); in its opening days he was elected by the Council Fathers to serve on its Commission on Religious.

On 2 October 1965, Pope Paul VI named him a titular archbishop and Apostolic Delegate to Jerusalem and Palestine. (Note: Lacking diplomatic relations, the Holy See had the secretary of its nunciature to Italy deliver the news of Sépinski's appointment to the Israeli embassy to Italy.)

He received his episcopal consecration on 31 November from Cardinal Amleto Cicognani.

On 5 May 1969, Pope Paul appointed him Apostolic Nuncio to Uruguay.

He retired on 29 July 1975.

He died on 31 December 1978, at the age of 78.
