= Ernest Victor Tweedy =

Australian Catholic bishop (1901–1965

The Most Reverend Ernest Victor Tweedy
- Archbishop Emeritus of Archdiocese of Hobart
- Archdiocese: Hobart
- Installed: 7 March 1943
- Term ended: 20 September 1955
- Other post: Titular Archbishop of Assuras (1955–1965)

Orders
- Ordination: 20 December 1925 at Propaganda Fide College Chapel, Rome by Willem Marinus van Rossum
- Consecration: 7 March 1943 at St John's Pro-Cathedral, Maitland by Giovanni Panico

Personal details
- Born: Ernest Victor Tweedy; 6 December 1901 Minmi, New South Wales, Australia
- Died: 27 September 1965 (aged 63) Melbourne, Victoria, Australia
- Buried: St Mary's Cathedral, Hobart, Australia
- Denomination: Catholic Church
- Occupation: Catholic bishop
- Education: Pontificio Collegio Urbano de Propaganda Fide
- Motto: Diligamus nos invicem (Let us love one another)

Ernest Victor Tweedy (6 December 1901 – 27 September 1965) was an Australian bishop of the Catholic Church. He served as the seventh Archbishop of Hobart.

== Early life ==
Tweedy was born in Minmi, New South Wales to Richard and Sarah Tweedy.

His father Richard was born in Newcastle upon Tyne, England and moved to New South Wales in 1886. He began working for the Bulli Coalmining Company as an engineer before being employed by J & A Brown in Minmi. Richard was not Catholic and only converted to Catholicism a few weeks prior to his death.

Ernest was the youngest of four children. His brother George became a brother for the Missionaries of the Sacred Heart.

He received his education from the Sisters of St Joseph at Bulli. After leaving school, he went to work with the Postmaster-General's Department (PMG) before leaving to study for the priesthood.

He began his studies at St Columba's College, Springwood before moving to St Patrick's Seminary. In 1922, he was sent to Rome to continue his studies for the priesthood.

== Priesthood ==
Tweedy was ordained to the priesthood in the Pontificio Collegio Urbano de Propaganda Fide Chapel on 20 December 1925 by Cardinal Willem Marinus van Rossum. He was ordained alongside Thomas McCabe, the future Bishop of Wollongong, and Ngô Đình Thục, a future sedevacantist bishop, who was excommunicated twice by the Catholic Church before being reconciled. He remained in Rome following his ordination to obtain a Doctor of Divinity.

Tweedy's first appointment was as assistant priest in Merewether. He was also Examiner of Christian Doctrine in the Diocese of Maitland schools from 1927 until 1932. He was transferred to Maitland in 1931 and became private secretary to Bishop Edmund Gleeson. He became administrator of St John's Church, Maitland in 1932 and remained in charge of the parish for 11 years.

== Episcopate ==
Tweedy was appointed Archbishop of Hobart on 17 December 1942 by Pope Pius XII. He was ordained and enthroned on 7 March 1943 in St John's Pro-Cathedral, Maitland by Archbishop Giovanni Panico, Apostolic Delegate to Australia.

During his episcopate, he invited many religious congregations to establish a presence in the Archdiocese. He helped establish the Our Lady's Home Missionary Sisters (now known as the Missionary Sisters of Service) in Launceston, in 1944. He invited the Salesians of Don Bosco to the Archdiocese in 1946, established a monastery for the Congregation of the Most Holy Redeemer in 1947, invited the Carmelite Nuns of Glen Osmond to make a new foundation in Launcestion, and established an aged care home run by the Poor Sisters of Nazareth.

He erected new parishes in the Archdiocese, including New Town, Newstead, Devonport, South Hobart and Brighton.

== Retirement and Death ==
On 10 October 1954, Bishop Guilford Clyde Young was appointed Coadjutor Archbishop of Hobart due to the ill-health of Tweedy, who was undergoing medical treatment in the Mercy Hospital in Melbourne at the time.

Tweedy retired as Archbishop of Hobart at the age of 53 following 18 months of severe illness which had required him to undergo major surgery. He was given the titular Archiepiscopal See of Assuras and moved to Melbourne following his retirement due to his health. He died in St Vincent's Hospital, Melbourne on 27 September 1965 following a severe heart attack.

His funeral took place on 30 September 1965 at St Patrick's Cathedral, Melbourne and was presided over by Archbishop Domenico Enrici along with 17 other prelates. He is buried in St Mary's Cathedral, Hobart.

Catholic Church titles
Preceded by Justin Simonds	Archishop of Hobart; 1943–1955	Succeeded by Guilford Clyde Young
Preceded by Alphonse Kirmann	Titular Archbishop of Assuras; 1955–1965	Succeeded by Augustin-Joseph Sépinski
