= Mark Freeman (bishop) =

Australian Latin Catholic bishop (born 1959)

The Most Reverend Mark Freeman
- Bishop of Ballarat
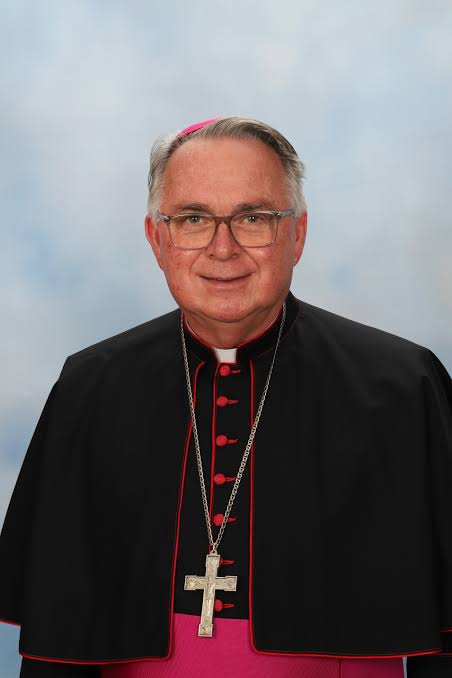
- Archdiocese: Ballarat
- Diocese: Catholic Diocese of Ballarat
- Appointed: 7 January 2026
- Installed: 19 March 2026

Orders
- Ordination: 24 August 1984 by Guilford Clyde Young
- Consecration: 19 March 2026 by Peter Comensoli

Personal details
- Born: Mark William Freeman; 13 September 1959 (age 66) Launceston, Tasmania, Australia
- Denomination: Catholic Church
- Education: Presentation Sisters at St Finn Barr's School, Invermay, Christian Brothers at St Patrick's College, Launceston, Corpus Christi College, Clayton in Victoria
- Alma mater: University of Divinity; Monash University; Pontifical Lateran University
- Motto: In Faith and Hope and Love
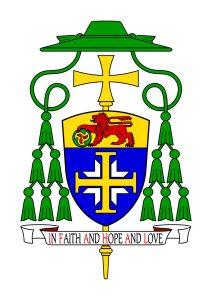
- Coat of arms

Styles of Mark Freeman
- Reference style: The Most Reverend
- Spoken style: His Lordship or My Lord Bishop
- Religious style: Bishop

Mark William Freeman (born 13 September 1959) is an Australian Catholic bishop. He has served as an bishop of the Diocese of Ballarat since 2026. His episcopal consecration took place on 19 March 2026.

== Early life ==
Freeman was born in Launceston, Tasmania, on 13 September 1959, the third of six children to George and Mary Freeman. He received his early education from the Presentation Sisters at St Finn Barr's School, Invermay, and then by the Christian Brothers at St Patrick's College, Launceston. He joined the seminary Corpus Christi College, Clayton in Victoria upon completing high school. While there he completed a Bachelor of Theology degree at the Melbourne College of Divinity and a Bachelor of Arts degree at Monash University.

== Priesthood ==
He was ordained a priest for the Archdiocese of Hobart by Archbishop Guilford Young at St Finn Barr's Church, Invermay on August 24, 1984. He was the last priest ordained for the Archdiocese of Hobart by Archbishop Young. Following his ordination, he served for four years as assistant priest of Bellerive and then assistant priest of Launceston. In 1990, he was appointed as the diocesan director of vocations and in 1991, he became the parish priest of West Coast. In 1993, he went to Rome for three years, studying patristics at the Augustinianum, an incorporated institute of the Pontifical Lateran University.

He returned to Hobart in 1996 and became parish priest of South Hobart. In 1998, he was appointed parish priest of Ulverstone and then parish priest of Mersey-Leven in 2003. In 2005, he was appointed vicar general of the Archdiocese of Hobart. In 2009, he briefly served as parish priest of Huon Valley before being appointed parish priest of Launceston in 2010. He served there for 12 years before being appointed chancellor of the Archdiocese in 2023.

== Episcopate ==
On 7 January 2026, Freeman was appointed as the Bishop of Ballarat, following the retirement of Bishop Paul Bird CSsR. He was the first new Australian bishop appointed by Pope Leo XIV.

He was ordained and installed as the ninth Bishop of Ballarat on 19 March 2026 by Archbishop Peter A Comensoli at St Patrick's Cathedral, Ballarat.
