= John Cullinane =

Australian Catholic bishop (1920–2000)

The Most Reverend John Cullinane
- Auxiliary Bishop Emeritus of Archdiocese of Melbourne
- Archdiocese: Melbourne
- Installed: 29 November 1967
- Term ended: 18 August 1974
- Other posts: Titular Bishop of Flumenzer (1959–2000); Auxiliary Bishop of Canberra and Goulburn (1959–2000)

Orders
- Ordination: 22 July 1944 at St Mary's Cathedral, Sydney by Norman Thomas Gilroy
- Consecration: 18 March 1959 at St Peter and Paul's Old Cathedral, Goulburn by Norman Thomas Gilroy

Personal details
- Born: John Neil Cullinane; 4 September 1920 Parkes, New South Wales, Australia
- Died: 13 August 2000 (aged 79) Drummoyne, New South Wales Australia
- Buried: Goulburn, New South Wales Australia
- Denomination: Catholic Church
- Occupation: Catholic bishop

John Neil Cullinane (4 September 1920 – 13 August 2000) was an Australian bishop of the Catholic Church. He served as Auxiliary Bishop of Canberra and Goulburn for eight years, and later served as Auxiliary Bishop of Melbourne for seven years before retiring at the age of 53.

== Early life ==
Cullinane was born in Parkes, New South Wales, the son of Reg and Ivy Cullinane. His family moved to Burwood and he was educated at Christian Brothers' High School, Lewisham

He commenced studies for the priesthood in Sydney and was sent to Rome however the outbreak of war in Italy meant he returned to Sydney to complete his studies.

== Priesthood ==
He was ordained a priest for the Archdiocese of Sydney on 22 July 1944 at St Mary's Cathedral, Sydney by Archbishop Norman Gilroy.

Following ordination, he began teaching in the ecclesiastical colleges in Sydney before volunteering for missionary work in Japan for five years. On his return, he served as private secretary to Archbishop Norman Gilroy. He then went to Rome to complete post-graduate studies where he remained until his appointment to the episcopate.

== Episcopate ==
On 13 January 1959, he was appointed Auxiliary Bishop of Canberra and Goulburn and Titular Bishop of Flumenzer. He was consecrated on 18 March 1959 by Cardinal Gilroy at St Peter and Paul's Old Cathedral.

One of the defining acts of his episcopate in Canberra and Goulburn occurred in 1962. At this time, Catholic schools did not receive funding from government, and a decline in religious brothers and sisters saw many Catholic schools in crisis.

The crisis came to a head in 1962 at St Brigid's Primary School which by this time had 84 students in one kindergarten classroom. Inspectors from the New South Wales Department of Education determined that in order to continue to operate, the school needed to install three additional toilets, to cater for the number of children enrolled. The school and the families of the children enrolled claimed to be unable to afford the cost of the additional toilets and with the support of Cullinane decided to take a stand on the matter.

In a speech on Saint Patrick's Day (17 March) of 1962, Cullinane stated, in front of Laurie Tully–the local Member of Parliament and government member–that St Brigid's may need to close. The local Catholics were refused a meeting with Ernest Wetherell, the New South Wales Minister for Education, to discuss the matter. The NSW government was advised that if it wished the school to stay open it could pay to have its requirements met. Local parents, paying taxes to support education, supported the Bishop's stand. Bishop Cullinane then invited the minister to a public meeting in Goulburn to debate the matter. While the minister did not attend, 700 locals did and voted 500 to 120 to close not just St Brigid's but all six Catholic schools in Goulburn; the 2000 students of those schools were to be instructed to seek enrolment at government schools.

The strike formally started on Monday, 16 July 1962 and was scheduled to last for six weeks. On that day, 2,000 children previously educated in Catholic schools in Goulburn presented themselves to government schools for enrolment. Of these 2,000, there was only room for around 640 to be enrolled.

While the strike was called off after a week, it sparked nationwide fears of the same being done elsewhere. While action was not immediate, in 1963, the Liberal Party of Australia Prime Minister Robert Menzies (a Protestant) announced a new policy committing to federal funding of science laboratories for all schools, government and non-government, and called an early election on this platform. The 1963 election was a success for Menzies who increased his margin by 10 seats, winning an additional seven seats in New South Wales.This result has been at least in part ascribed to Catholic voters leaving their traditional support for the ALP.

In 1964, Cullinane was injured in a fatal road accident near Bredbo and spent several days in hospital.

On 29 November 1967, Cullinane was appointed Auxiliary Bishop of Melbourne. It was highly unusual for an auxiliary bishop to be transferred to another diocese to simply be an auxiliary bishop in the new diocese too. His transfer to Melbourne was suggested to have been a result of him clashing with the Sydney hierarchy of the Church.

When Cardinal James Robert Knox was appointed prefect of the Congregation for Divine Worship and the Discipline of the Sacraments, Cullinane was touted as the favourite to replace him as Archbishop of Melbourne. Instead, Thomas Francis Little, another auxiliary bishop of Melbourne, was chosen to be Archbishop of Melbourne.

Cullinane instead offered his resignation at the age of just 53 on 18 August 1974.

== Death ==
Cullinane died on 13 August 2000 in Drummoyne, Sydney. He was buried in Kenmore Roman Catholic Cemetery, Goulburn.

Catholic Church titles
Preceded by –	Auxiliary Bishop of Melbourne; 1967–1974	Succeeded by –
Preceded by –	Auxiliary Bishop of Canberra and Goulburn; 1959–1967	Succeeded by –
Preceded by –	Titular Bishop of Flumenzer; 1959–2000	Succeeded by William Francis Malooly
