= Eris O'Brien =

Australian Catholic prelate (1895–1974)

His Grace The Most Reverend Eris O'Brien CMG FRGS FRHS FRAHS
- 2nd Archbishop of Canberra and Goulburn
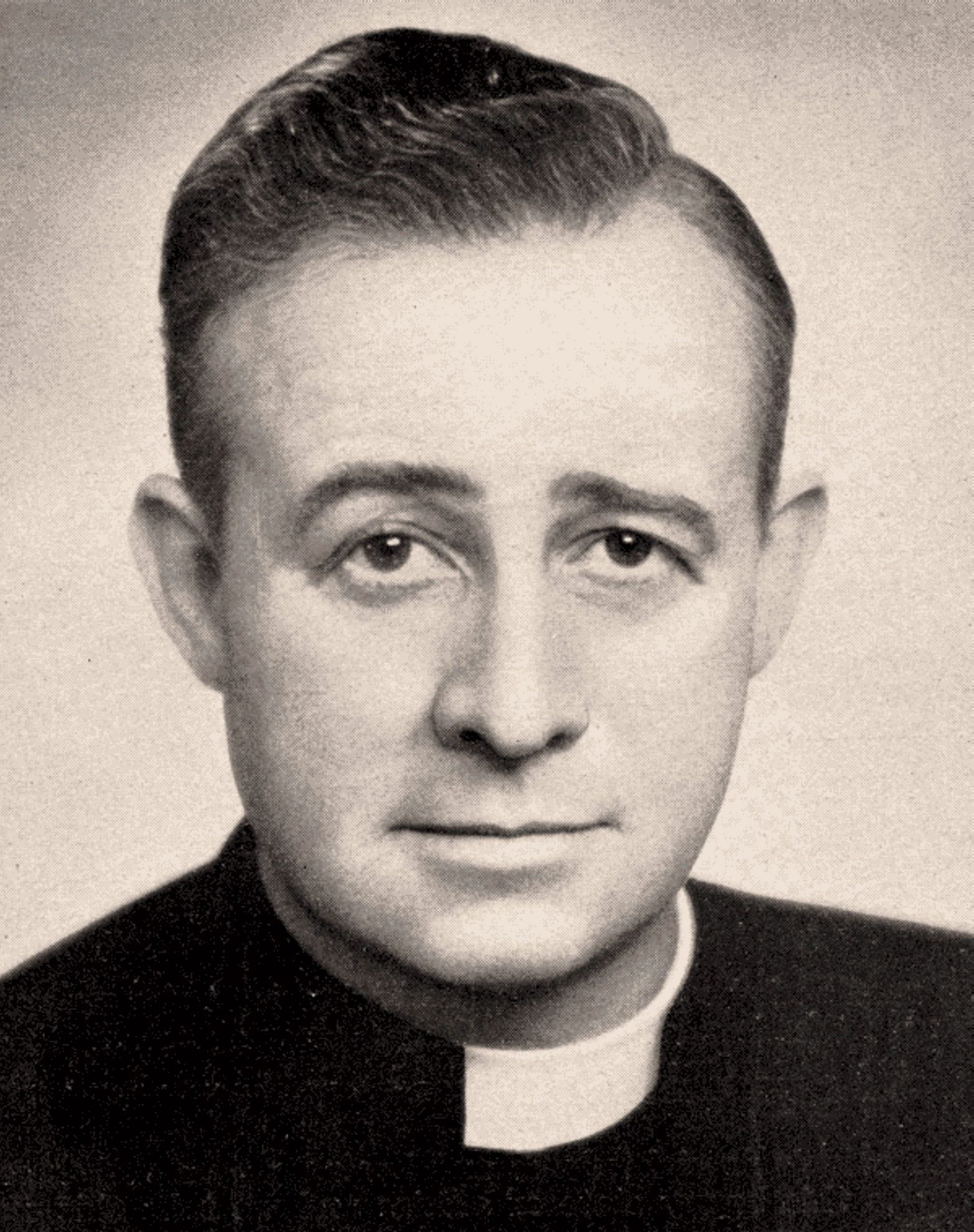
- Church: Catholic Church
- Archdiocese: Archdiocese of Canberra and Goulburn
- Province: Immediately Subject to the Holy See
- See: Canberra and Goulburn
- Appointed: 16 November 1953
- Installed: 28 December 1953
- Term ended: 29 November 1966
- Predecessor: Terence McGuire
- Successor: Thomas Cahill
- Previous posts: Auxiliary Bishop of Sydney (1948-1951); Titular Bishop of Alinda (1948-1951); Titular Archbishop of Cyrrhus (1951-1953); Titular Archbishop of Apamea (1966-1974)

Orders
- Ordination: 30 November 1918, Sydney by Bartolomeo Cattaneo
- Consecration: 6 April 1948, Sydney by Giovanni Panico

Personal details
- Born: Eris Norman Michael O'Brien; 20 September 1895 Condobolin, Colony of New South Wales
- Died: 28 February 1974 (aged 78) Richmond, New South Wales
- Buried: St Christopher's Cathedral, Canberra
- Occupation: Cleric
- Profession: Roman Catholic Bishop

Styles of Eris O'Brien
- Reference style: His Grace, The Most Reverend
- Spoken style: Your Grace
- Religious style: Archbishop

Eris O'Brien CMG (20 September 1895 – 28 Feb 1974) was an Australian prelate of the Catholic Church and historian. He was Auxiliary Bishop of Sydney, New South Wales, Australia (1948–1951) and the second archbishop of the Canberra-Goulburn (1953–1966).

== Early life ==
Eris Norman Michael O'Brien was born in Condobolin, New South Wales, the eldest of three children of Terence O'Brien, a native-born police constable, and his Irish-born wife Bertha, née Conroy. The family moved to Sydney and Eris studied at St Aloysius' College. After training at St Patrick's Seminary, Manly he was ordained a priest in 1918.

== Priesthood ==
O'Brien served in several Sydney parishes and wrote two books on the history of the Catholic Church in nineteenth-century Australia, The Life and Letters of Archpriest John Joseph Therry (1922, also titled The Foundation of Catholicism in Australia), and The Dawn of Catholicism in Australia, the story of Fr Jeremiah O'Flynn (1928).

In 1934 he was granted leave to attend the Catholic University of Louvain, Belgium, where he gained a Ph.D. (1936), and the National University of Ireland, Dublin, where he gained an M.A. His resulting book, The Foundation of Australia (1786-1800) (London, 1937), was well received. In 1940 he was instrumental in founding the Australian Catholic Historical Society.

Back in Sydney he lectured part-time at Sydney University and was parish priest of Bankstown and Neutral Bay.

== Auxiliary Bishop of Sydney ==
O'Brien was consecrated Auxiliary Bishop of Sydney in 1948. The same year he was a member of the Australian delegation to the third session of the United Nations General Assembly in Paris and sat on the committee dealing with human rights. He was elevated to the Archiepiscopate by Pius XII as the titular Archbishop of Cyrrhus.

== Archbishop of Canberra-Goulburn ==
O'Brien was made Archbishop of Canberra-Goulburn in 1953 and dealt with rapid expansion of church parishes and schools in Canberra. He cautiously supported the Goulburn School Strike in 1962, which protested against lack of subsidies to Church schools and played a role in gaining state aid for Church schools.

== Later Life & Death ==
The Archbishop resigned in 1967 due to failing health and moved back to Sydney. In accordance with standard Vatican practice at the time, he was appointed to the titular archiepiscopal see of Apamea. O'Brien participated in all four sessions of the Second Vatican Council as a Council Father. He died in Richmond, New South Wales in 1974, and was interred in St Christopher's Cathedral, Canberra.

Catholic Church titles
Preceded by N/A	Auxiliary Bishop of Sydney; 1948 - 1951	Succeeded by N/A
Preceded by Terence McGuire	Archbishop of Canberra-Goulburn; 1953—1967	Succeeded by Thomas Cahill
