= Assura (disambiguation) =

Assura (or Assuras) was a town in the Roman province of Proconsular Africa.

Assura may also refer to:

- The Roman Catholic titular see of Assura
- Assura plc, a British company
- Assura Medical, a former division of Assura Group, now part of Virgin Group
- Code of Assura, an Assyrian code of laws
- A village in Cuyuni-Mazaruni, Guyana

== See also ==
- Assur, an archaeological site in Iraq
