= St Christopher's Cathedral, Manuka =

St Christopher's Cathedral
- The Cathedral of St Christopher
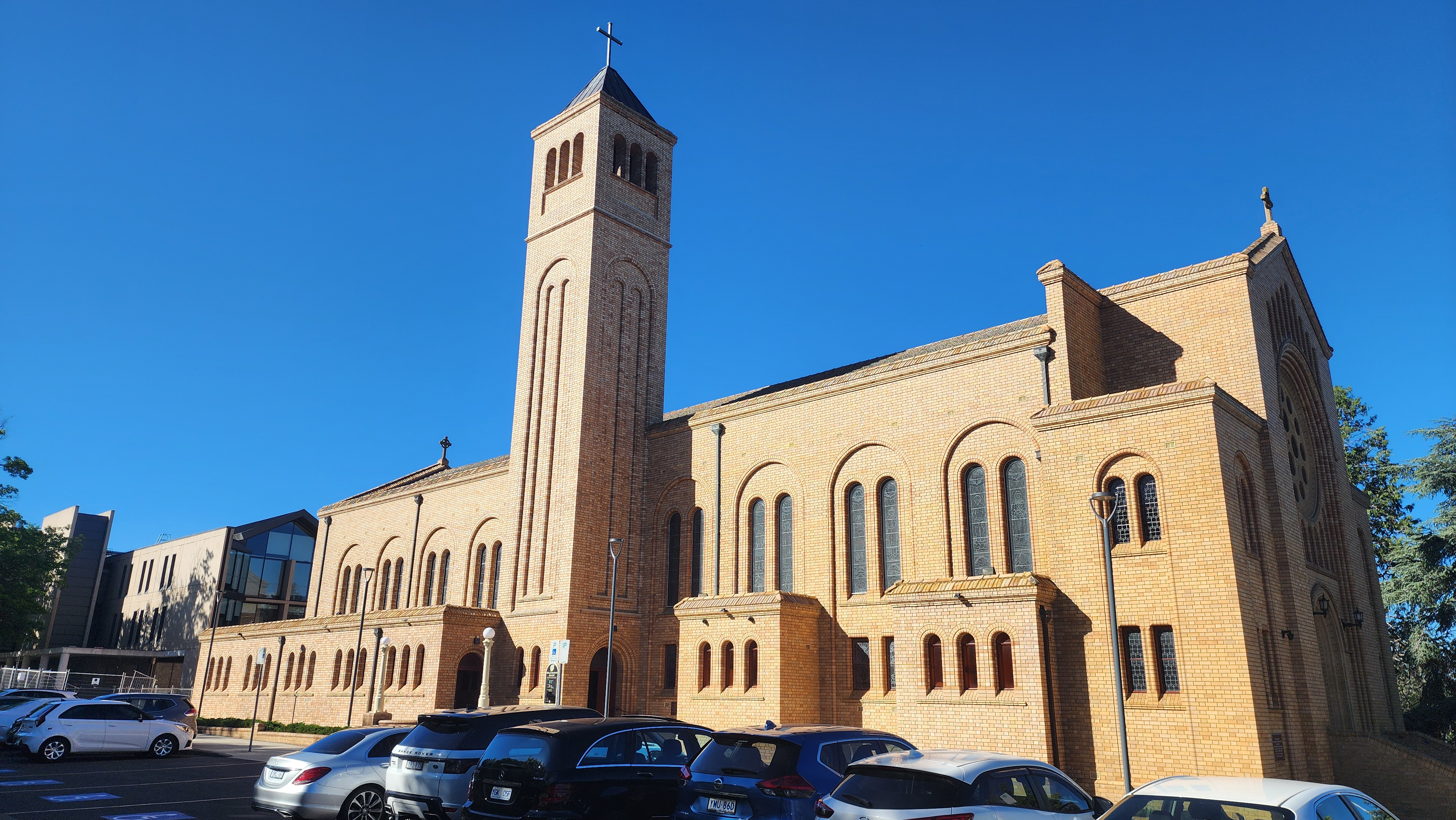

- Location in the Australian Capital Territory
- 35°19′08″S 149°07′58″E
- Location: 55 Franklin Street, Forrest/Manuka, Australian Capital Territory
- Country: Australia
- Denomination: Roman Catholic
- Website: cg.org.au/cathedral/

History
- Former name: St Christopher's Church
- Status: Cathedral
- Founded: 1927; 99 years ago (as St Christopher's Church); 8 May 1938; 88 years ago (as St Christopher's Cathedral)
- Founders: Archbishop Michael Kelly (as St Christopher's Church); Archbishop of Sydney Norman Gilroy (as St Christopher's Cathedral)
- Dedication: Saint Christopher
- Consecrated: 5 February 1948

Architecture
- Functional status: Active
- Heritage designation: ACT Heritage Register
- Designated: 1998
- Architects: Clement Glancy (Snr.); Clement Glancy (Jnr.)
- Architectural type: Spanish Romanesque

Specifications
- Capacity: c. 1,000 worshippers

Administration
- Archdiocese: Canberra and Goulburn
- Deanery: Central Deanery

Clergy
- Archbishop: Most Rev. Christopher Prowse
- Dean: Rev. Fr. Paul Nulley
- Priest: Rev. Fr. Daniel Ukpong

St Christopher's Cathedral, officially The Cathedral of St Christopher, is the main place of Roman Catholic worship and the seat of the Archbishop of the Archdiocese of Canberra and Goulburn, in the city of Canberra, in the Australian Capital Territory, Australia.

The Cathedral of St Christopher is located in the suburb of Forrest, but in the local centre known as Manuka.

== History ==
St Christopher's was built as the first parish church in Canberra by the first priest, Father Patrick Haydon, although the beginnings of Catholic life in the district go back to 1862 when the Diocese of Goulburn was erected. The parish was originally part of St Gregory's Parish, Queanbeyan, until 1912. Following the erection of the Diocese of Wagga Wagga in 1918, the parish was transferred to the Diocese of Goulburn.

A foundation stone was laid by Archbishop Kelly in 1927 for a church and school. The following year St Christopher's became an independent parish with the first classes taught in the adjacent school, and the open day attended by the Prime Minister, Bruce. Father Patrick Haydon was appointed as parish priest of the new St Christopher's Parish at Manuka in 1928. A foundation stone for the cathedral was laid in 1938 by Archbishop of Sydney Gilroy in a ceremony which included Joseph Lyons and James Scullin. The choice of St Christopher as patron saint was selected on the basis that Canberra would be a place to which many travellers would come. In the presence of Robert Menzies, the Apostolic Delegate, Archbishop Panico, opened the parish church in 1939.

Haydon oversaw the building of a convent and school, opened in 1928, and the first stage of St Christopher's Cathedral which was completed in 1939. The Catholic community had intended to build a full cathedral on a site reserved for the purpose at Commonwealth Avenue near Regatta Point, but this plan was never realised as the Great Depression took away the church's ability to raise funds for the project and the impetus was never regained.

The first ordination in St Christopher's Church took place in 1947 when Vivian Morrison, the son of the pioneering Morrison family (who donated the tower and bells of the extended cathedral) of Tralee Queanbeyan, was ordained to the priesthood. The following year, the Archdiocese of Canberra (and Goulburn) was created and St Christopher's became a pro-cathedral.

When Archbishop Eris O'Brien took up residence in Canberra it became a co-cathedral with St Peter and St Paul, Goulburn. St Christopher's was extended to twice its size, holding 1,000 worshippers. This work, which retained the stained glass windows of the original church, was completed in 1973 according to plans developed by Clement Glancy, son of the original architect. The plans for the enlarged church included the bell tower, Blessed Sacrament Chapel, large sacristies and a crypt. The extensions were consecrated by Archbishop Cahill and the extended St Christopher's became the cathedral church of the Archdiocese of Canberra and Goulburn, superseding St Peter and St Paul, Goulburn. In June 2008, under the direction of Archbishop Mark Coleridge, the cathedral was refurbished to mark the diamond jubilee of the archdiocese. The cathedral has had three Catholic prime ministers as regular parishioners; Scullin, Lyons and Frank Forde.

The present pipe organ was built by Hill, Norman & Beard from Melbourne and was used by St James' Anglican Church, King Street, Sydney, while their organ was being rebuilt. Its size was doubled when installed on the gallery in 1972. There are 1,100 wood and metal pipes contained in two cases on either side of the rose window.

In 1998 the cathedral was listed on the ACT Heritage Register by the ACT Heritage Council.

In 2010 it was reported that the Archdiocese planned to commence a A$35 million redevelopment of the precinct surrounding St Christopher's Cathedral, to include church offices and aged care units.

Archbishops Eris O'Brien, Thomas Cahill and Francis Carroll are buried in the crypt of the cathedral.

== Overview ==
Members of the Parliament of Australia often have their year opening prayers at St Christopher's or St Paul's, Manuka, usually in February during the first sitting period. St Christopher's also hosts significant national and diocesan services for the national capital. These include major ecumenical services, because St Christopher's is the largest church in the national capital of any Christian denomination.

== See also ==
- Roman Catholicism in Australia
