= Diocese of Canberra and Goulburn =

Diocese of Canberra and Goulburn or Archdiocese of Canberra and Goulburn could refer to:

- Anglican Diocese of Canberra and Goulburn in the Anglican Church of Australia
- Roman Catholic Archdiocese of Canberra and Goulburn in the Roman Catholic Church in Australia
