= John Gallagher (bishop) =

Australian Bishop of the Catholic Church

The Most Reverend John Gallagher
- 3rd Bishop of Goulburn
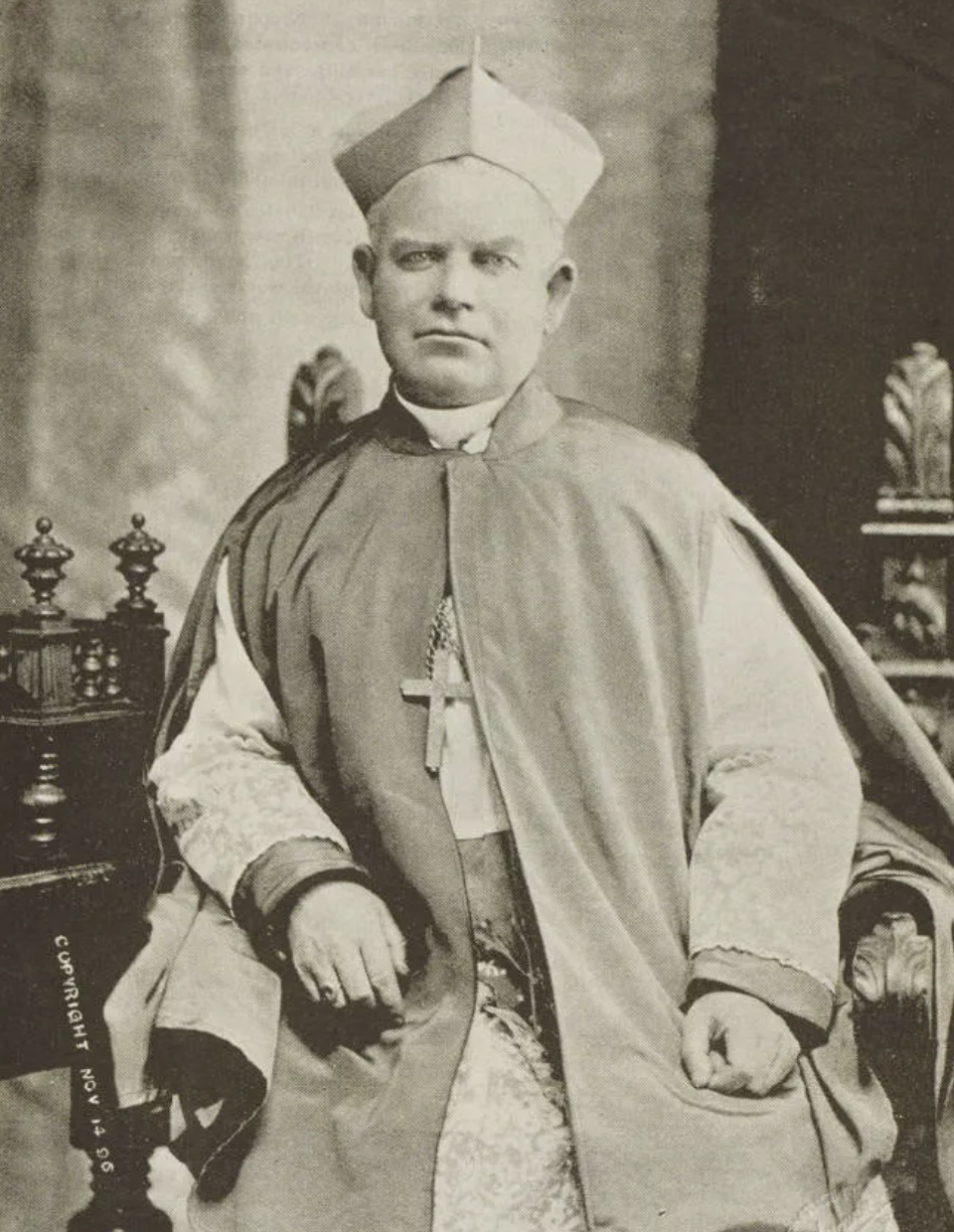
- Bishop Gallagher photographed in 1896
- Church: Catholic Church
- Province: Sydney
- See: Goulburn
- Appointed: 25 March 1895 (Coadjutor)
- Installed: 13 June 1900
- Term ended: 26 November 1923
- Predecessor: William Lanigan
- Successor: John Barry
- Previous post: Coadjutor Bishop of Goulburn (1895-1900)

Orders
- Ordination: 1 November 1869, Maynooth by William Lanigan
- Consecration: 7 July 1895, Goulburn by Patrick Francis Moran

Personal details
- Born: John Gallagher; July 4, 1846 Castlederg, Ireland
- Died: November 27, 1923 (aged 77) Goulburn, New South Wales
- Buried: Cathedral of Sts Peter and Paul, Goulburn
- Denomination: Roman Catholic

Styles of John Gallagher
- Reference style: The Right Reverend
- Spoken style: My Lord
- Religious style: Bishop

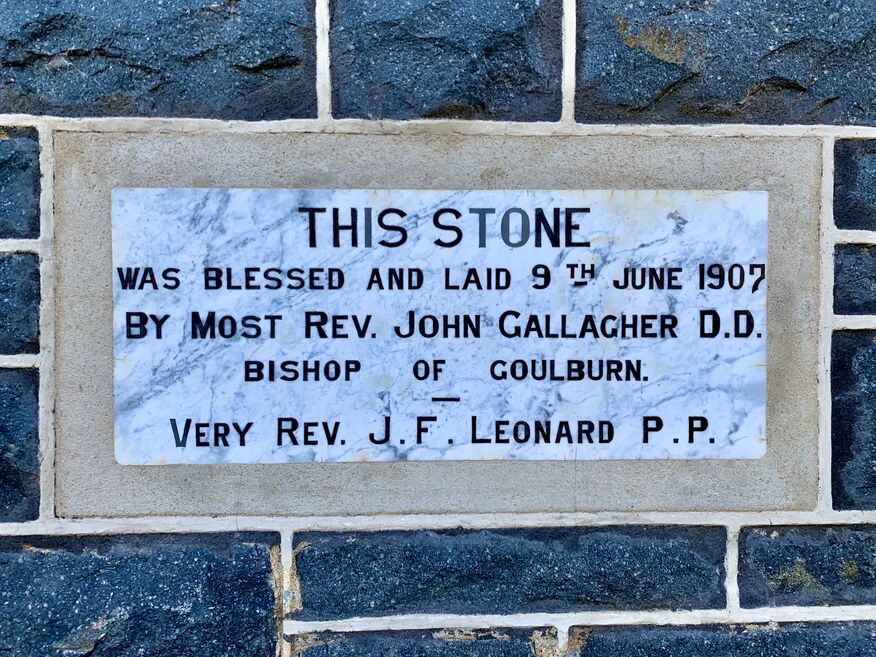
Foundation stone of St Francis Xavier's Catholic Church in Hall, ACT

Bishop John Gallagher (1846–1923) was an Irish born priest who served as the Roman Catholic Bishop of Goulburn, Australia. Born in Castlederg, Ireland, in 1846, he was ordained in 1869 for the diocese of Goulburn by the Archbishop of Sydney Cardinal Moran. He served as a priest in Goulburn, Dr Gallagher a noted classicist, taught at St Patrick's College, Goulburn, where he served as president of the college from 1875 until 1888. Dr Gallagher was appointed Titular Bishop of Adrassus, co-adjutor Bishop of Goulburn and in 1900 Bishop of Goulburn. In 1916 he laid the foundation stone of Sacred Heart Church, Cootamundra.

== Depiction in Literature ==
"John O'Brien"'s 1921 comic poem, 'Tangmalangaloo', in which a bishop visiting a remote bush school asks a boy what Christmas is and receives the reply "It's the day before the races out at Tangmalangaloo" is a true story of a visit by Gallagher to Tangmangaroo.

== Death ==
Bishop Gallagher died in Goulburn on 26 November 1923, after a long illness. A requiem mass was celebrated on 29 November and, similarly to his predecessor Bishop Lanigan, Bishop Gallagher was interred beneath the sanctuary of the Goulburn Cathedral.
