= Sexual abuse scandal in the Roman Catholic Archdiocese of Canberra and Goulburn =

Sexual abuse cases in Australia

The sexual abuse scandal in Canberra and Goulburn archdiocese is a significant chapter in the Catholic sexual abuse scandal in Australia that occurred in the Roman Catholic Archdiocese of Canberra and Goulburn involving individuals from the Marist Brothers and the Missionaries of the Sacred Heart.

== Convictions recorded against clergy from Marist College, Canberra ==
In February 2008, a teacher at Marist College Canberra, Brother John William Chute (also known as Brother Kostka), pleaded guilty in the ACT Magistrates Court to 11 charges of indecently assaulting students of the college during the 1980s. Seven further charges against Chute relating to alleged offences committed before 1985 were dropped, due to a legal limitation that charges relating to sexual indecency had to be made within a year. In June 2008, Chute was sentenced in the ACT Supreme Court to six years in jail, serving two years in prison, one year in weekend detention, and three years suspended.

=== Civil claim ===
In February 2008, a statement of civil claim was lodged against Marist College Canberra in the ACT Supreme Court by a number of former students. The claim alleged that students were sexually abused by five teachers over a thirty-year period, and sought damages from the school for negligence. In April 2009, the Marist Brothers denied a claim that a ring of pedophile abusers operated in the 1970s and 1980s.

== Accusations prompt suicide ==
A teacher at Daramalan College in Canberra was also charged with numerous sexual assaults in 2000; however he committed suicide shortly after he was charged.
