= Terence McGuire =

His Grace The Most Reverend Terence McGuire
- 1st Archbishop of Canberra and Goulburn
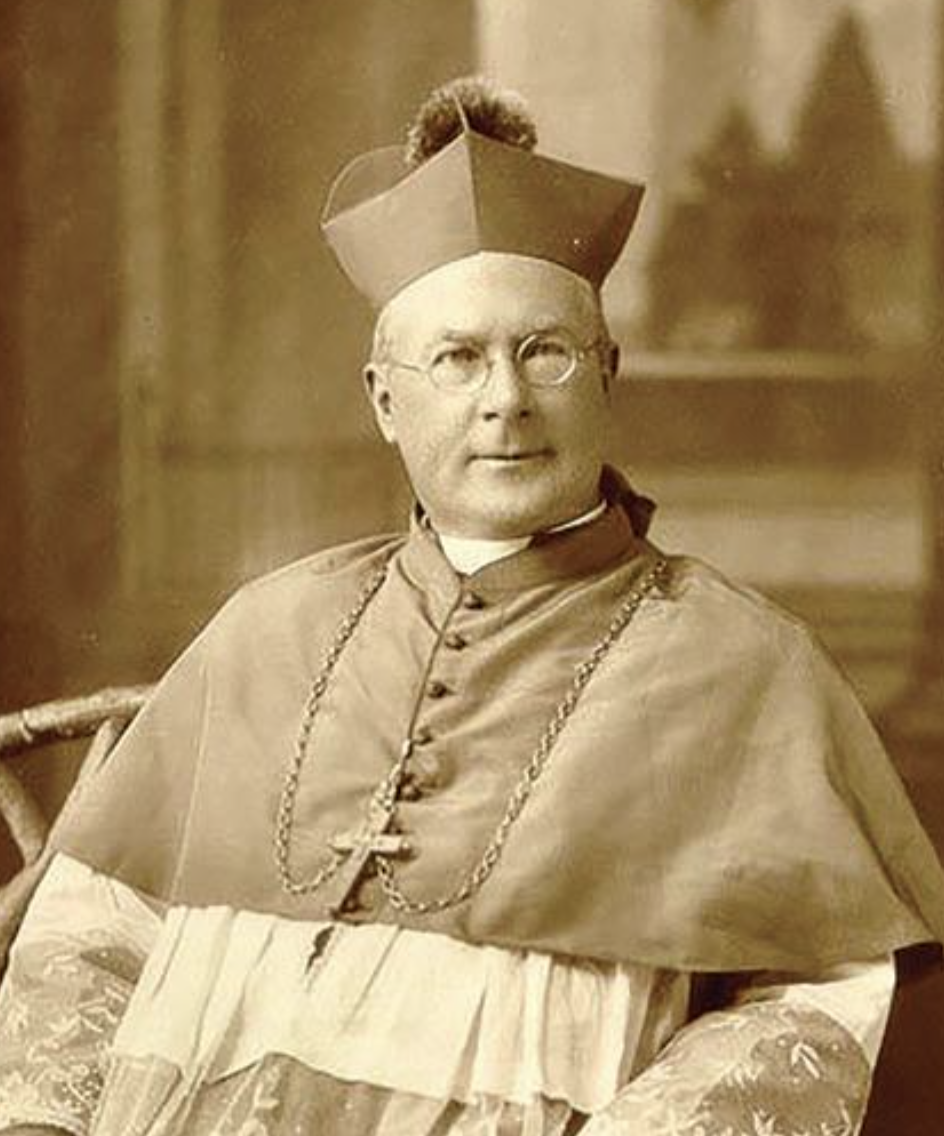
- Church: Catholic Church
- Archdiocese: Canberra and Goulburn
- Province: Immediately Subject to the Holy See
- See: Canberra and Goulburn
- Appointed: 5 February 1948
- Installed: 13 June 1948
- Term ended: 4 August 1953
- Predecessor: John Barry (As Bishop of Goulburn)
- Successor: Eris O'Brien
- Previous posts: Bishop of Townsville (1930-1938); Bishop of Goulburn (1938-1948)

Orders
- Ordination: 19 March 1904, Basilica of St John Lateran, Rome by Pietro Respighi
- Consecration: 25 May 1930, Sacred Heart Cathedral, Townsville by Bartolomeo Cattaneo

Personal details
- Born: Terence Bernard McGuire; 19 September 1881 Moree, Colony of New South Wales
- Died: July 4, 1957 (aged 75) Goulburn, New South Wales
- Denomination: Roman Catholic
- Occupation: Cleric
- Profession: Roman Catholic Bishop

Styles of Terence McGuire
- Reference style: His Grace, The Most Reverend
- Spoken style: Your Grace
- Religious style: Archbishop

Terence Bernard McGuire (1881–1957) was the Roman Catholic Bishop of Townsville in Queensland and the Roman Catholic Bishop of Goulburn and the Roman Catholic Archbishop of Canberra and Goulburn in New South Wales, all in Australia.

== Early life ==
McGuire was born on 19 September 1881 in Moree, New South Wales.

== Religious life ==
McGuire was the Bishop of Townsville from 12 February 1930 to 14 June 1938. He was appointed the Bishop of Goulburn from 14 June 1938, becoming the Archbishop of Canberra and Goulburn on 5 February 1948.

== Later life ==
McGuire died on 4 July 1957.
