= William Lanigan =

Australian bishop (1820–1900)

The Right Reverend William Lanigan
- 2nd Bishop of Goulburn
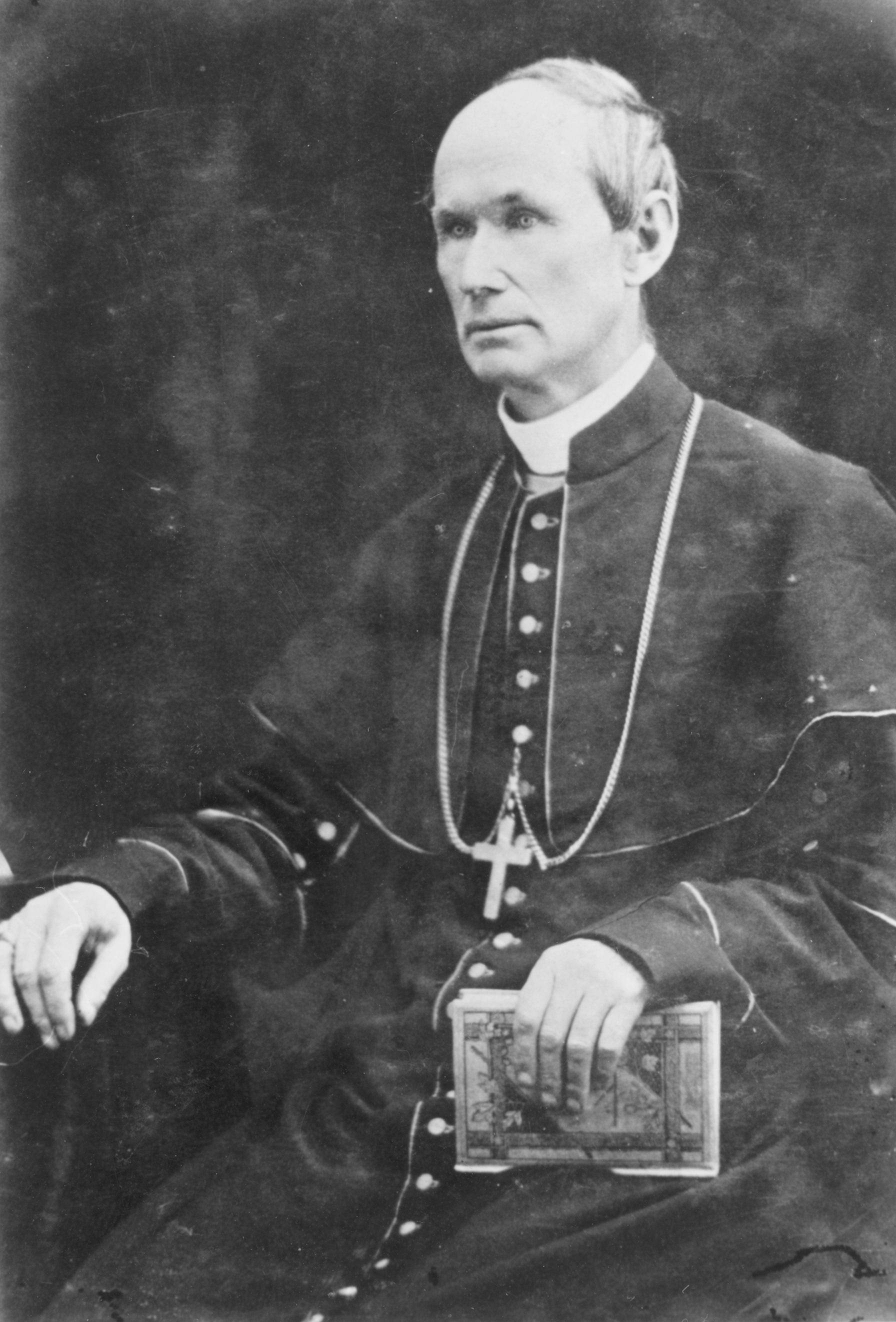
- Diocese: Roman Catholic Diocese of Goulburn
- See: Goulburn
- Appointed: 19 April 1867
- Installed: 2 June 1867
- Term ended: 13 June 1900
- Predecessor: Patrick Geoghegan
- Successor: John Gallagher

Orders
- Ordination: 8 April 1848 by Michael Slattery
- Consecration: 2 June 1867 by James Quinn; Matthew Quinn; James Murray

Personal details
- Born: William Lanigan; 1 May 1820 County Tipperary, Ireland
- Died: 13 June 1900 (aged 80) Goulburn, Colony of New South Wales
- Buried: Goulburn
- Denomination: Roman Catholic
- Education: St Patrick's College, Maynooth

Styles of William Lanigan
- Reference style: The Right Reverend
- Spoken style: My Lord
- Religious style: Bishop

William Lanigan (1 May 1820 – 13 June 1900), was Roman Catholic Bishop of Goulburn, from 1867 until his death in 1900.

Lanigan was born in County Tipperary, Ireland, the son of Thomas Lanigan and his wife Brigid Anastasia, née Dauton. He was educated at Thurles and Maynooth Colleges. He was ordained priest at Maynooth on 8 April 1848, and emigrated to Sydney in 1859. After seven years' missionary work in Goulburn and Berrima, he was consecrated Bishop of Goulburn on 2 June 1867.

Bishop Lanigan died on 13 June 1900 at the age of 80. He served the Diocese of Goulburn for over forty years, thirty-three of which he served as bishop. He was buried beneath the sanctuary of the Cathedral of Sts Peter and Paul, the cathedral which he established and completed in his tenure.

Catholic Church titles
Preceded by Patrick Geoghegan	Bishop of Goulburn; 1867–1900	Succeeded by John Gallagher
