= Archdiocese of Canberra and Goulburn =

Catholic ecclesiastical territory in Australia

Archdiocese of Canberra and Goulburn Archidioecesis Camberrensis et Gulburnensis Archdiocese of Canberra and Goulburn
- Coat of Arms of the Archdiocese of Canberra and Goulburn

Location
- Country: Australia
- Territory: The Australian Capital Territory, and the South West Slopes, Southern Tablelands, Monaro and the South Coast regions of New South Wales
- Metropolitan: Immediately subject to the Holy See
- Coordinates: 35°17′41″S 149°07′36″E

Statistics
- Area: 88,000 km^{2} (34,000 sq mi)
- Population: Total; Catholics: (as of 2016); ▲633,000; ▲170,900 (▼27%)
- Parishes: 55

Information
- Denomination: Catholic Church
- Sui iuris church: Latin Church
- Rite: Roman Rite
- Established: 17 November 1862 as the Diocese of Goulburn; 5 February 1948 as the Archdiocese of Canberra (and Goulburn); 19 June 2006 as the Archdiocese of Canberra and Goulburn
- Cathedral: St Christopher's Cathedral
- Patron saint: St Mary

Current leadership
- Pope: Leo XIV
- Archbishop: Christopher Prowse
- Vicar General: Fr Richard Thompson

Map

Website
- Archdiocese of Canberra and Goulburn

The Archdiocese of Canberra and Goulburn is a Latin Church ecclesiastical territory or archdiocese of the Catholic Church located in the Australian Capital Territory, and the South West Slopes, Southern Tablelands, Monaro and the South Coast regions of New South Wales, Australia. Erected in 1948, the archdiocese is directly subject to the Holy See.

St Christopher's Cathedral at Manuka is the seat of the Catholic Archbishop of Canberra and Goulburn. On 12 September 2013 it was announced that the Bishop of Sale, Christopher Prowse, had been appointed as the next Archbishop of Canberra and Goulburn. Archbishop Prowse was installed on 19 November 2013.

== History ==
The diocese of Goulburn was established in 1864 to serve the needs of the scattered rural, overwhelmingly Irish, Catholics of the south coast, southern highlands and south-west slopes of New South Wales.

On 5 February 1948 the diocese was redesignated an archdiocese.

== Bishops ==
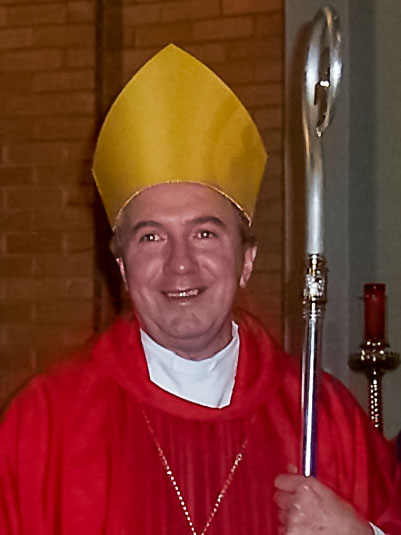
Archbishop Prowse in 2006

=== Ordinaries of Canberra and Goulburn ===
Bishops of Goulburn

The following individuals have served as Roman Catholic Bishop of Goulburn:

Order	Name	Date enthroned	Reign ended	Term of office	Reason for term end
1	Patrick Geoghegan, O.F.M. †	10 March 1864	9 May 1864	60 days	Died in office
2	William Lanigan †	18 December 1866	13 June 1900	33 years, 177 days	Died in office
3	John Gallagher †	13 June 1900	26 November 1923	23 years, 166 days	Died in office
4	John Barry †	29 June 1924	22 March 1938	14 years, 21 days	Died in office
5	Terence McGuire †	14 June 1938	5 February 1948	19 years, 236 days	Elevated to Archbishop of Canberra (and Goulburn)

Patrick Geoghegan was appointed bishop on 10 March, however he died while in Ireland and did not formally take possession of the See.

James Hanley was Administrator starting in May 1863, and was Bishop-elect of this diocese, 1865–1866, but that appointment did not take effect.

Archbishops of Canberra and Goulburn

The following individuals have served as Roman Catholic Archbishop of Canberra and Goulburn:

Order	Name	Date enthroned	Reign ended	Term of office	Reason for term end
1	Terence McGuire †	5 February 1948	16 November 1953	5 years, 284 days	Resigned and appointed Archbishop Emeritus of Canberra (and Goulburn)
2	Eris O'Brien †	16 November 1953	20 November 1966	13 years, 4 days	Resigned and appointed Archbishop Emeritus of Canberra (and Goulburn)
3	Thomas Cahill †	13 April 1967	16 April 1978	11 years, 3 days	Died in office
4	Edward Bede Clancy †	24 November 1978	12 February 1983	4 years, 80 days	Translated as Archbishop of Sydney
5	Francis Carroll †	25 June 1983	19 June 2006	22 years, 359 days	Retired and appointed Archbishop Emeritus of Canberra and Goulburn
6	Mark Coleridge	19 June 2006	2 April 2012	20 years, 152 days	Translated as archbishop of the Roman Catholic Archdiocese of Brisbane
7	Christopher Prowse	19 November 2013	present	12 years, 364 days	incumbent

Edward Bede Clancy became Cardinal in 1988.

=== Coadjutor bishop ===
- John Gallagher † (1895–1900)

=== Auxiliary bishops ===
- Guilford Clyde Young † (1948–1954), appointed Coadjutor Archbishop of Hobart
- John Neil Cullinane † (1959–1967), appointed Auxiliary Bishop of Melbourne
- John Aloysius Morgan † (1969–1985)
- Patrick Dougherty † (1976–1983), appointed Bishop of Bathurst
- Patrick Percival Power † (1986–2012)

=== Other priests of this diocese who became bishops ===
- John Dunne †, appointed Bishop of Wilcannia in 1887
- Patrick Joseph Clune † (priest here, 1886–1894), appointed Bishop of Perth in 1910
- Joseph Wilfred Dwyer †, appointed Bishop of Wagga Wagga in 1918
- Anthony Percy, appointed Auxiliary Bishop of Sydney in 2025

== Cathedral ==
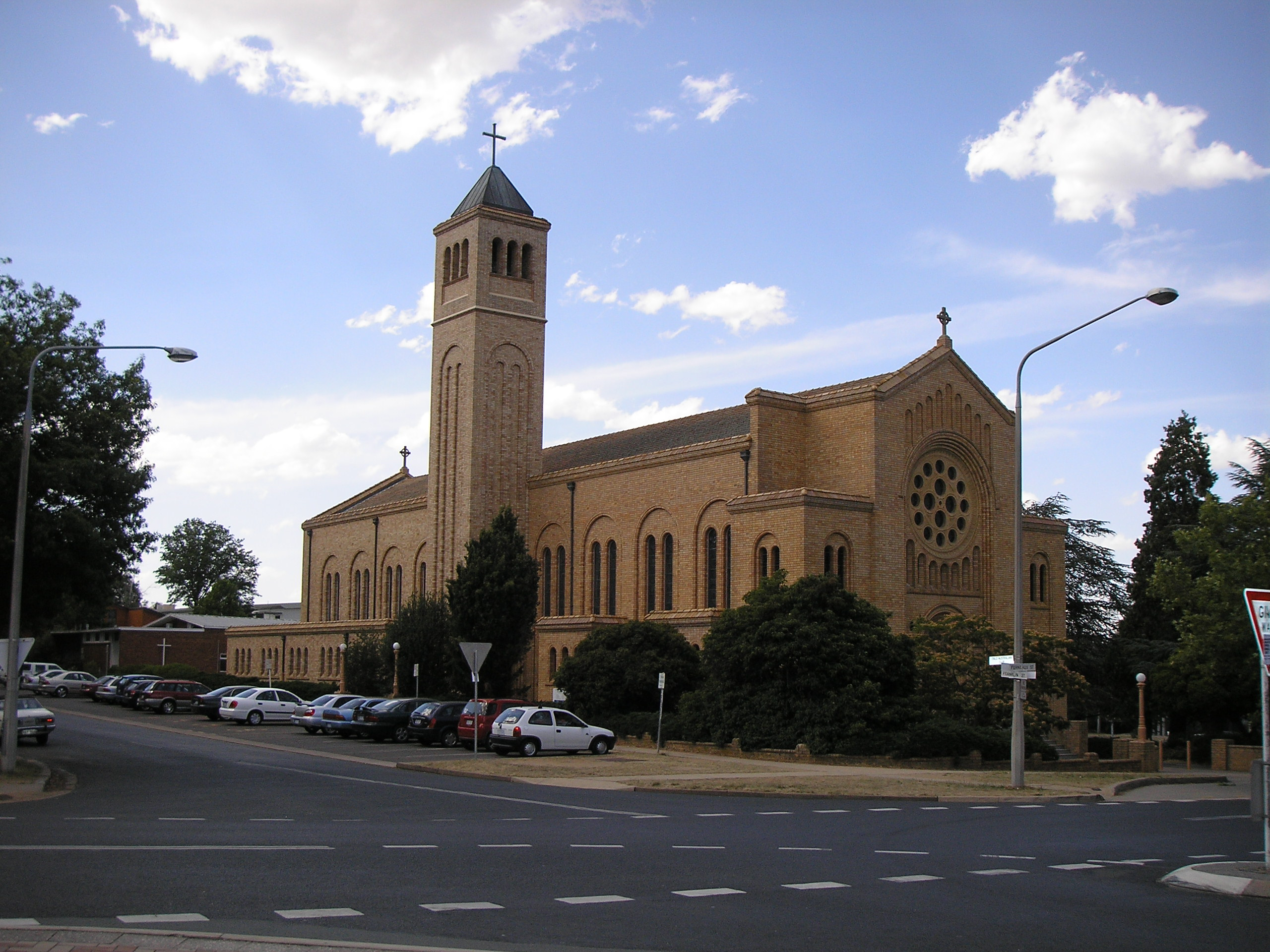
St Christopher's Cathedral, Canberra

St Christopher's was built as the first parish church in Canberra by the first priest, Father Patrick Haydon, although the beginnings of Catholic life in the district go back to 1862 when the Diocese of Goulburn was erected. The parish was originally part of St Gregory's Parish, Queanbeyan, until 1912. Following the erection of the Diocese of Wagga Wagga in 1918, the parish was transferred to the Diocese of Goulburn. A foundation stone was laid by Archbishop Kelly in 1927 for a church and school. The following year St Christopher's became an independent parish with the first classes taught in the adjacent school, and the open day attended by the Prime Minister, Bruce. In 1930 a large cathedral was proposed for the site behind Regatta Point, but economic circumstances and World War II made this impractical. A foundation stone for the cathedral was laid in 1930 by Archbishop of Sydney Gilroy in a ceremony which included Joseph Lyons and James Scullin. The choice of St Christopher as patron saint was selected on the basis that Canberra would be a place to which many travellers would come. In the presence of Robert Menzies, the Apostolic Delegate, Archbishop Panico, opened the parish church in 1939.

The first ordination in St Christopher's Church took place in 1947 when Vivian Morrison, the son of the pioneering Morrison family (who donated the tower and bells of the extended cathedral) of Tralee Queanbeyan, was ordained to the priesthood. The following year, the Archdiocese of Canberra (and Goulburn) was created and St Christopher's became a pro-cathedral. When Archbishop Eris O'Brien took up residence in Canberra it became a co-cathedral with St Peter and St Paul, Goulburn. St Christopher's was extended to twice its size, holding 1000 worshippers. This work, which retained the stained glass windows of the original church, was completed in 1973 according to plans developed by Clement Glancy, son of the original architect. The plans for the enlarged church included the bell tower, Blessed Sacrament Chapel, large sacristies and a crypt. The extensions were consecrated by Archbishop Cahill and the extended St Christopher's became the cathedral church of the Archdiocese of Canberra and Goulburn, superseding St Peter and St Paul, Goulburn. In June 2008, under the direction of Archbishop Mark Coleridge, the cathedral was refurbished to mark the diamond jubilee of the archdiocese. The cathedral has had three Catholic prime ministers as regular parishioners; Scullin, Lyons and Frank Forde.

The present pipe organ was built by Hill, Norman & Beard from Melbourne and was used by St James' Anglican Church, King Street, Sydney, while their organ was being rebuilt. Its size was doubled when installed on the gallery in 1972. There are 1100 wood and metal pipes contained in two cases on either side of the rose window.

In 2010 it was reported that the archdiocese planned to commence a A$35 million redevelopment of the precinct surrounding St Christopher's Cathedral, to include church offices and aged care units. In subsequent media reports, the diocese entered into an agreement with the ACT Government to exchange land held by the church in Braddon to partially fund the redevelopment of the cathedral site. However, a proposed listing of St Patrick's Church in Braddon on the register of the Heritage Council may mean that the redevelopment may not proceed.

Archbishops Eris O'Brien and Thomas Cahill are buried in the crypt of the cathedral.

== Archbishop's residence ==
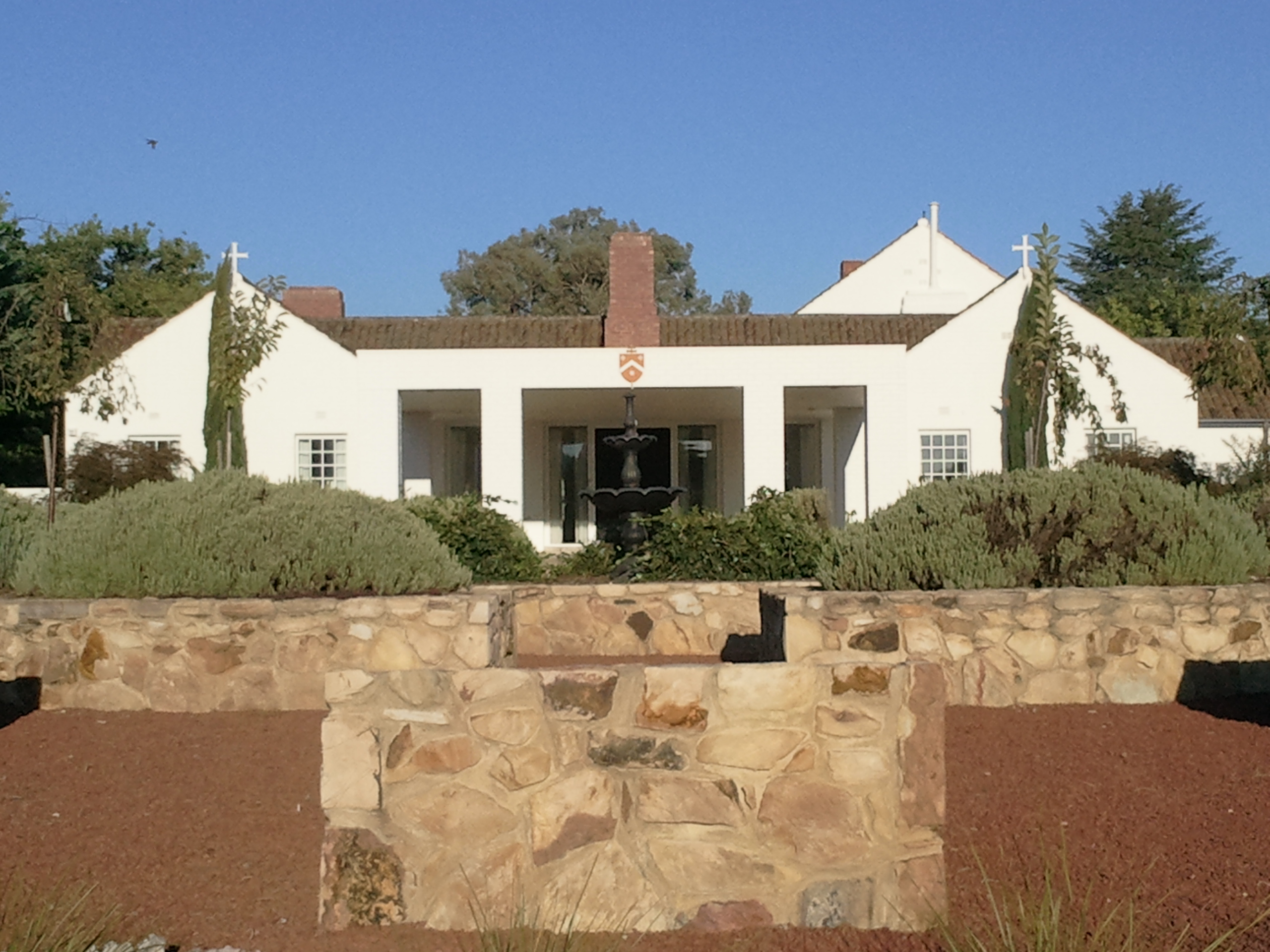
Official residence of the Archbishop. Plinth of Foundation Stone in foreground.

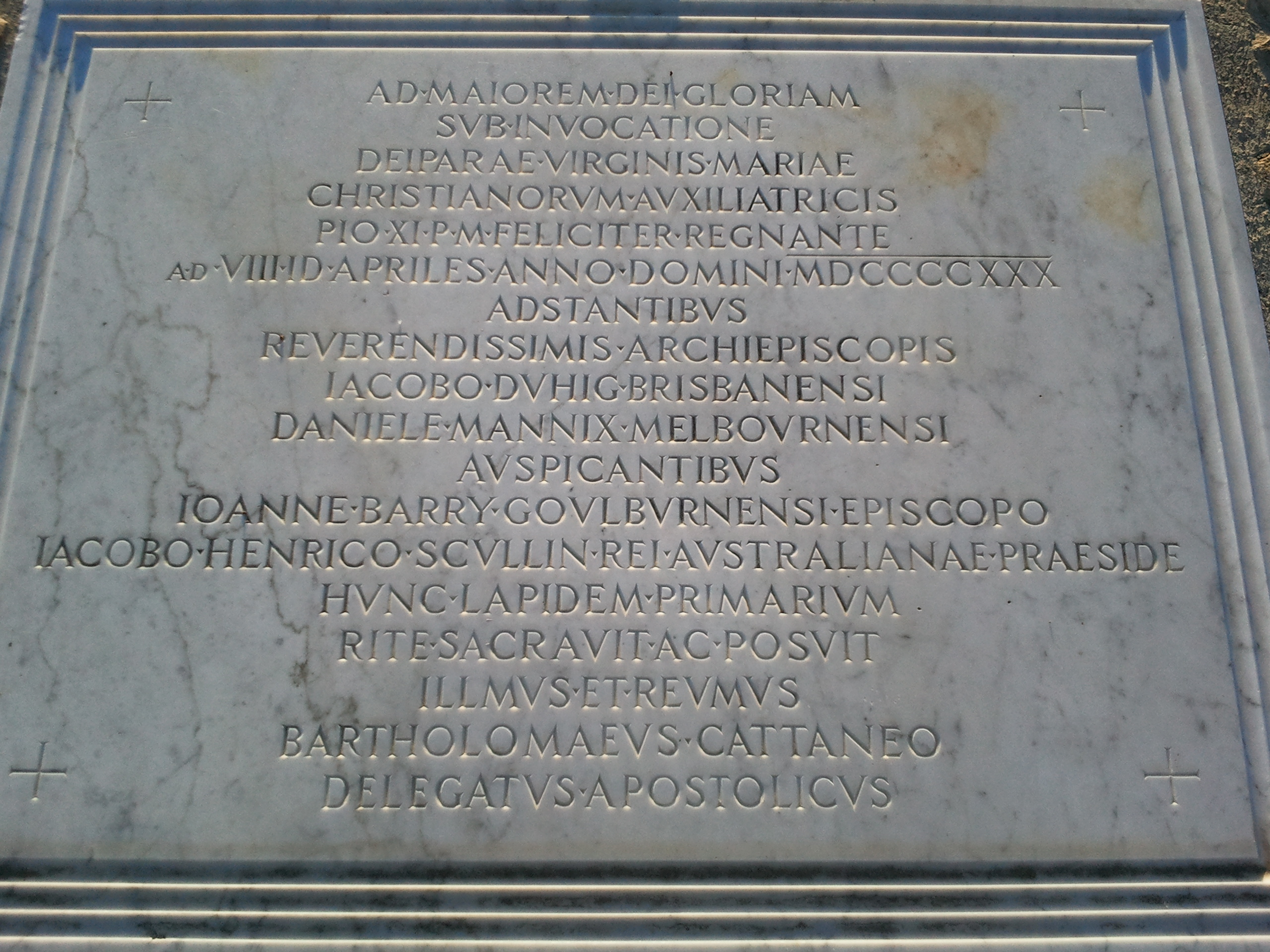
Foundation stone

The official residence of the Archbishop is in Canberra, at Regatta Point, Parkes, ACT. It was officially opened on 8 April 1930, during the time of Bishop John Barry. The foundation stone at the front is inscribed in Latin.

At the time of its erection, it would have overlooked the valley of the Molonglo River with views to Parliament House to the south.

The house is on a hill at the south-eastern side of the road fly-over of Commonwealth Avenue and Parkes Way. When Lake Burley Griffin was built in the 1960s (the current Commonwealth Bridge was opened in the 1963) road access became more difficult, as the driveway is at an off-ramp of Parkes Way to Commonwealth Avenue.

== Parishes ==
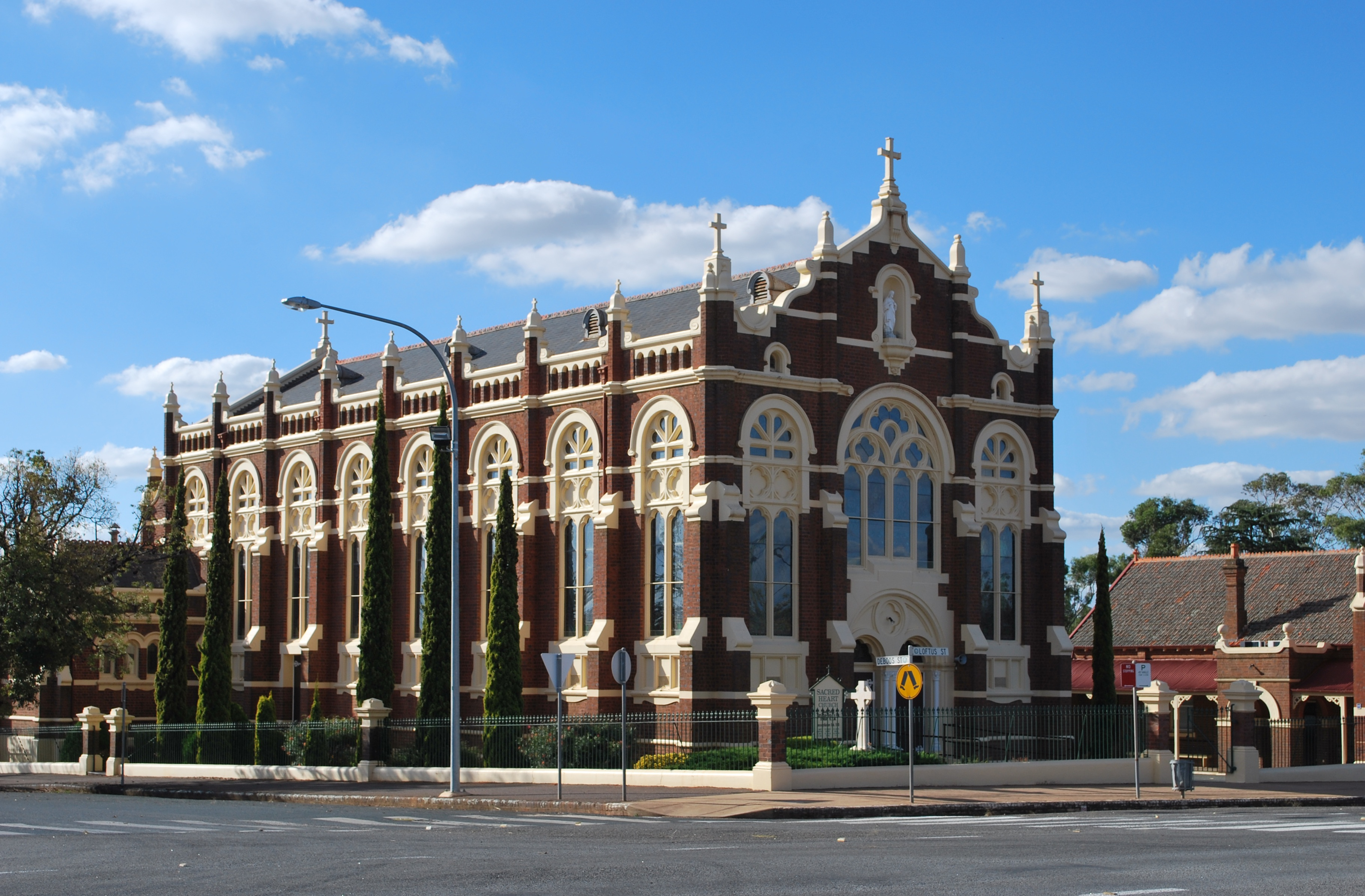
Sacred Heart Church in Temora

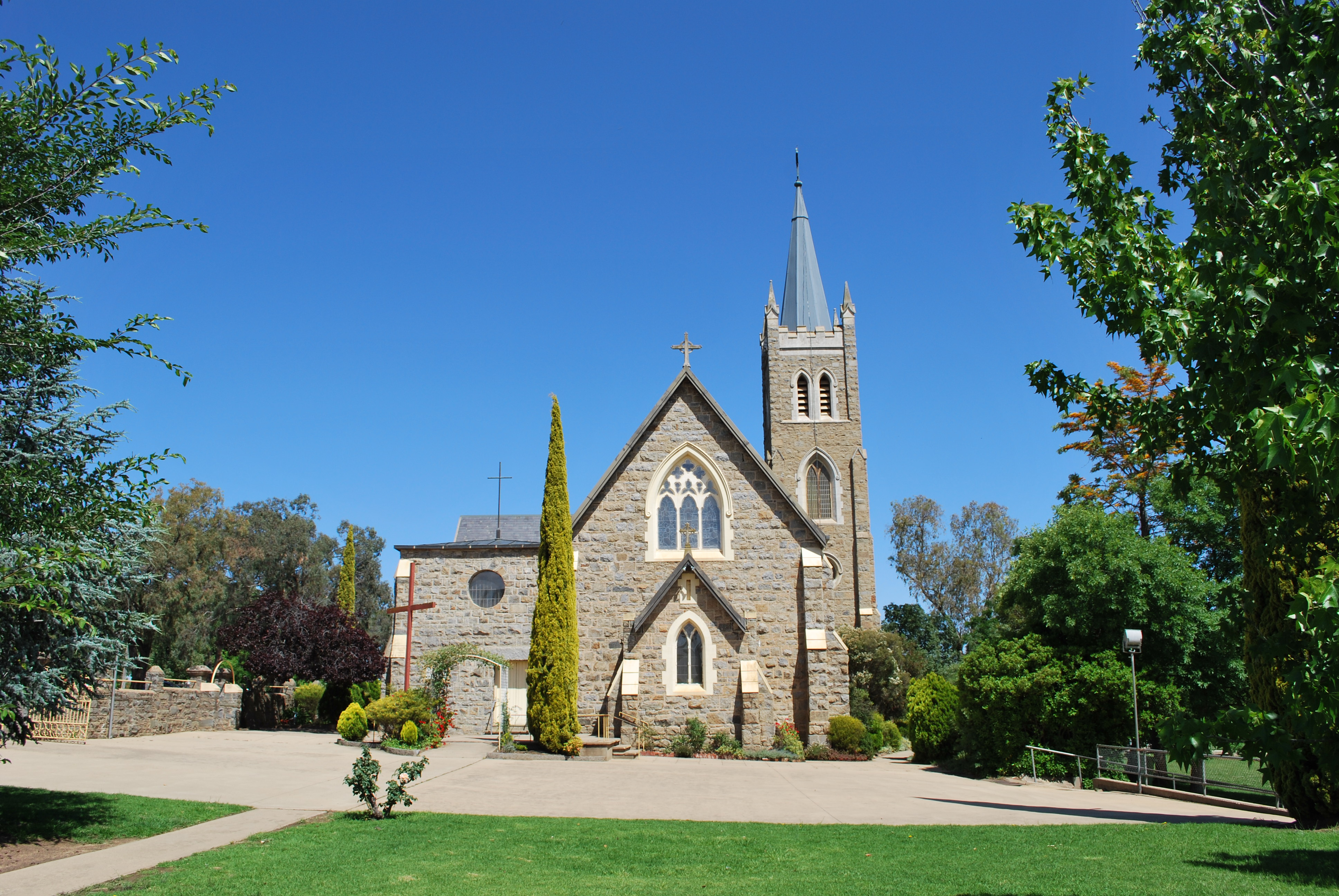
St Mary's Church in Young

The archdiocese is divided into five separate deaneries which administer individual parishes:

1. The Central Deanery covers the Australian Capital Territory with parishes located in the Canberra suburbs of Manuka (Cathedral of St Christopher), Aranda (St Vincent de Paul), Campbell (St Thomas More), Canberra Central (St Brigid in Dickson and St Patrick in Braddon), Charnwood (St Thomas Aquinas), Evatt (St Monica), Gungahlin (Holy Spirit in Amaroo and St Francis Xavier in Hall), Kaleen (St Michael), Kambah (St Thomas the Apostle), Kippax (St John the Apostle), Narrabundah (St Benedict), North Woden (Holy Trinity in Curtin, Ss Peter & Paul in Garran, and John XXIII College Chapel at ANU), O'Connor (St Joseph), Page (St Matthew), South Tuggeranong (Holy Family in Gowrie, Sacred Heart Church in Calwell, and St Clare of Assisi School in Conder), South Woden (St Augustine in Farrer and Sacred Heart in Pearce), Wanniassa (St Anthony of Padua), Watson (Holy Rosary), Weston Creek (St Jude in Holder and St John Vianney in Waramanga).
2. The Coastal Deanery covers the South Coast with parishes located in Batemans Bay (St Bernard), Bega (St Patrick in Bega, St Columba in Bemboka, St Joseph in Candelo, Star of the Sea in Tathra, and All Saints in Wolumla), Cobargo (Our Lady of Good Counsel in Cobargo and Our Lady Help of Christians in Bermagui), Moruya (Sacred Heart in Moruya and The Pines in Tuross Head), Narooma (Our Lady Star of the Sea), and Pambula (Our Lady Star of the Sea in Eden, St Peter in Pambula, St Joseph in Merimbula, St Joseph in Wyndham).
3. The Monaro Deanery covers the Monaro with parishes located in Bombala (Our Lady of the Blessed Sacrament in Bombala and St Joseph in Delegate), Cooma (St Patrick in Cooma, St Mary in Adaminaby, St Andrew in Nimmitabel, All Saints in Numeralla), Jindabyne (St Columbkille in Jindabyne, John Paul II Ecumenical Centre / Mary MacKillop Chapel in Thredbo, St Joseph in Berridale, Our Lady Star of the Sea in Dalgety, St Thomas in Moonbah, and Our Lady of the Snow in Perisher), and Michelago (St Patrick in Michelago, All Saints in Bredbo, and St Patrick in Jerangle).
4. The Northern Deanery covers the Southern Tablelands with parishes located in Braidwood (St Bede), Bungendore (St Mary), Crookwell (St Mary in Crookwell and St Peter in Binda), Goulburn (Ss Peter and Paul and Our Lady of Fatima on Goulburn, St Bartholomew in Collector, St Patrick in Marulan, and St Laurence O'Toole in Spring Valley), Gunning (St Francis Xavier), Queanbeyan (St Raphael and St Gregory), Taralga (Christ the King), and Yass (St Augustine in Yass and Our Lady of the Rosary in Wee Jasper).
5. The Western Deanery covers the South West Slopes with parishes located in Adelong (St James in Adelong and St Mary in Batlow), Ardlethan (Our Lady Help of Christians in Ardlethan and Sacred Heart in Ariah Park), Barellan (St Therese), Binalong (St Patrick), Boorowa (St Patrick), Bribbaree (St Columba in Bribbaree and St Brigid in Quandialla), Cootamundra (Sacred Heart in Cootamundra, St Mark in Muttama, St Joseph in Stockinbingal, St Columba's Wallendbeen), Grenfell (St Joseph), Gundagai (St Patrick in Gundagai, Our Lady of Sorrows in Gobarralong, and St Patrick in Adjungbilly), Jugiong (St John the Evangelist), Lake Cargelligo (Our Lady of Lourdes in Lake Cargelligo, St Isadore in Tullibigeal, and St Kevin in Rankin Springs), Murrumburrah (St Anthony in Harden), Tumut (Immaculate Conception in Tumut, St Paul in Talbingo), Temora (Sacred Heart in Temora and St Joseph in Barmedman), Ungarie (St Joseph), Weethalle (St Patrick in Weethalle and St Bernadette in Tallimba), West Wyalong (St Mary), and Young (St Mary in Young, St Columbanus in Wombat, and Sacred Heart in Murringo).

== Controversy ==
The Canberra and Goulburn archdiocese has been the scene of a series of sexual abuse cases which have come to light in recent years and have also extended to many regional Catholic jurisdictions, both in Australia and around the world.

=== Dominicans leave Holy Rosary, Watson ===
The Dominican Friars have been part of the parish of Holy Rosary, (Blackfriars) Watson, but as of November 2023 have been forced to hand over stewardship of the parish due to dwindling numbers of friars, and the remaining friars will leave Canberra.

== See also ==
- Catholicism in Australia
- Anglican Diocese of Canberra and Goulburn
