= Juliosebaste =

Town of ancient Cilicia and later of Isauria

Coordinates: 36°12′36″N 32°24′55″E

Juliosebaste or Iuliosebaste, also possibly known as Heliosebaste, was a town of ancient Cilicia and later of Isauria, inhabited during Byzantine times. Under the name of Heliosebaste, it became a bishopric; no longer the seat of a residential bishop, it remains a titular see of the Roman Catholic Church.

Its site is located near Asar tepe, in Asiatic Turkey.
