= Saint-Julien-lès-Metz =

- Commune
- Location of Saint-Julien-lès-Metz
- Location within France Location within Grand Est
- Coordinates: 49°08′05″N 6°12′12″E
- Country: France
- Region: Grand Est
- Department: Moselle
- Arrondissement: Metz
- Canton: Le Pays Messin
- Intercommunality: Metz Métropole

Government
  - Mayor (2020–2026): Franck Osswald
- Area^{1}: 4.55 km^{2} (1.76 sq mi)
- Elevation: 125 m (410 ft)
- Highest elevation: 275 m (902 ft)
- Lowest elevation: 162 m (531 ft)
- Population (2023): 3,554
  - Density: 781/km^{2} (2,020/sq mi)
- Time zone: UTC+01:00 (CET)
  - Summer (DST): UTC+02:00 (CEST)
- INSEE/Postal code: 57616 /57070
- ^{1} French Land Register data, which excludes lakes, ponds, glaciers > 1 km^{2} (0.386 sq mi or 247 acres) and river estuaries.

Saint-Julien-lès-Metz (French pronunciation: [sɛ̃ ʒyljɛ̃ lɛ mɛs], literally Saint-Julien near Metz; German: Sankt Julian bei Metz) is a commune in the Moselle department in Grand Est in north-eastern France.

== Population ==
Historical population
Year	Pop.	±% p.a.
1968	2,678	—
1975	2,667	−0.06%
1982	2,990	+1.65%
1990	2,971	−0.08%
1999	3,134	+0.60%
2007	2,963	−0.70%
2012	2,948	−0.10%
2017	3,421	+3.02%
2023	3,554	+0.64%
Source: INSEE

== See also ==
- Communes of the Moselle department
