= St Peter and Paul's Old Cathedral =

- St. Peter and Paul's Former Cathedral; St Peter and Paul's Catholic Cathedral; Saints Peter and Paul's Catholic Cathedral
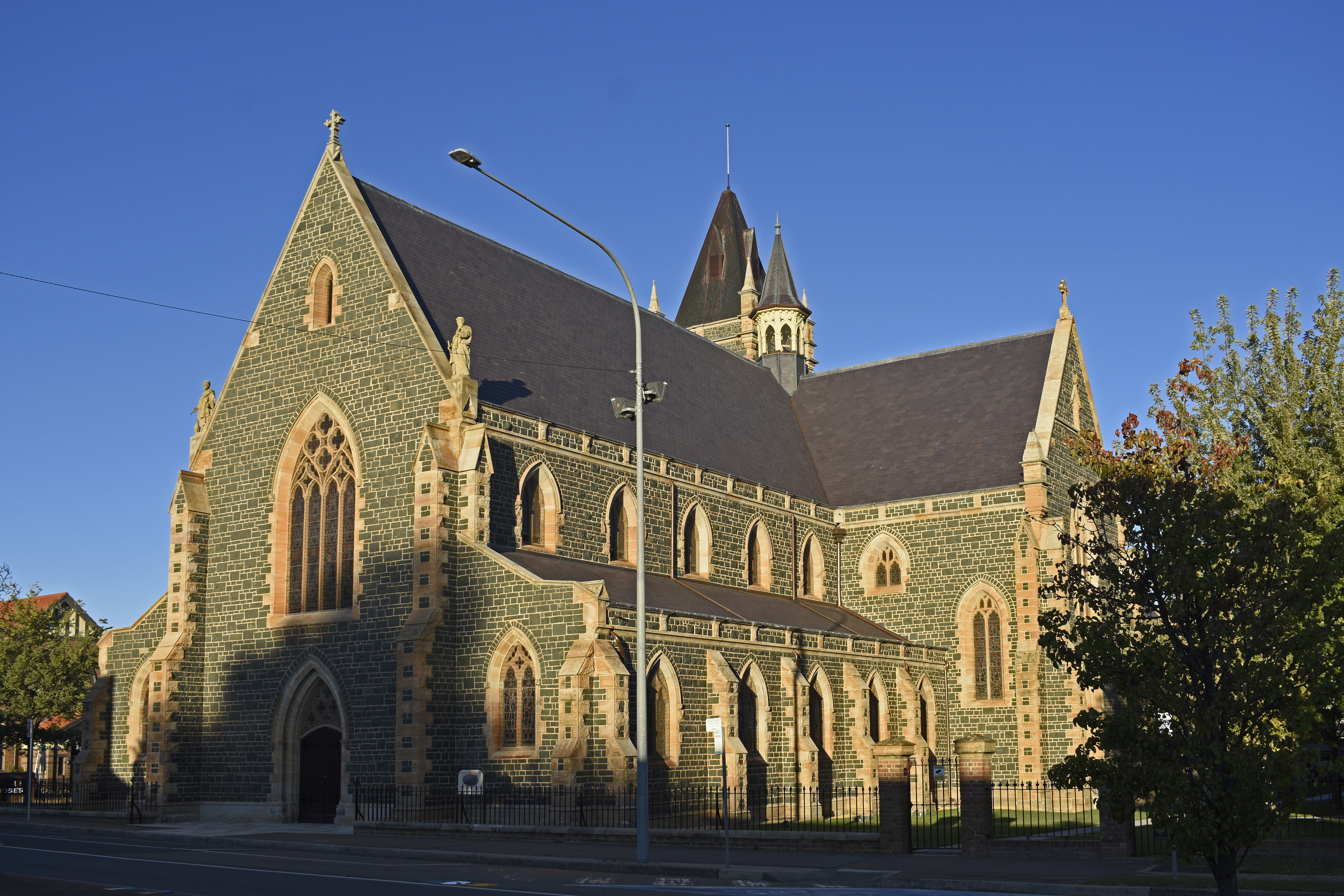
- Saints Peter and Paul's Old Cathedral seen from the west

- Location in New South Wales
- 34°45′21″S 149°42′54″E
- Location: 42 Verner Street, Goulburn, Goulburn Mulwaree Council, New South Wales
- Country: Australia
- Denomination: Catholic
- Website: cg.org.au/Goulburn/home.aspx

History
- Status: Church
- Founded: 12 December 1871
- Founder: Bishop William Lanigan
- Dedication: Saint Peter and Saint Paul
- Consecrated: 25 April 1898 by Cardinal Moran

Architecture
- Functional status: Active
- Architects: Andrea Stombuco; Charles Spadacini
- Architectural type: Cathedral (former)
- Style: Victorian Gothic Revival
- Years built: 1871–1890

Specifications
- Materials: Sandstone; slate

Administration
- Archdiocese: Canberra-Goulburn
- Parish: Goulburn: Mary, Queen of Apostles

Clergy
- Priest: Fr Michael Lim

New South Wales Heritage Register
- Official name: St. Peter and Paul's Former Cathedral; St Peter and Paul's Catholic Cathedral; Saints Peter and Paul's Catholic Cathedral
- Type: State heritage (built)
- Designated: 20 April 2009
- Reference no.: 1797
- Type: Cathedral
- Category: Religion
- Builders: C. J. O'Brien; Wilkie Bros

St Peter and Paul's Old Cathedral is a heritage-listed former Catholic cathedral and now parish church at 42 Verner Street, Goulburn, Goulburn Mulwaree Council, New South Wales, Australia. It was designed by Andrea Stombuco and Charles Spadacini and built from 1871 to 1890 by C. J. O'Brien and Wilkie Bros. It is also known as St. Peter and Paul's Former Cathedral and St Peter and Paul's Catholic Cathedral; Saints Peter and Paul's Catholic Cathedral. It was added to the New South Wales State Heritage Register on 20 April 2009.

== History ==
Goulburn was originally a central place for the gathering of Aboriginal groups. In the 1820s the richness of the black soil plains of the Southern Tablelands drew white settlers for agriculture and grazing and by the 1830s there was great pastoral expansion based upon the export value of Australian wool. Goulburn became the centre for commerce, trade and administration in the area. The first Catholic priest came to Goulburn in 1838 and during the growth period of the 1840s a brick church was built on the site. The diocese was created in 1864, reflecting the strong regional growth of the 1860s, and which was further stimulated by the arrival of the railway in 1869.

Saints Peter and Paul's former cathedral was built in two stages around the original brick 1843 church on the site. The foundation stone for the construction of a cathedral nave which was connected to the old church was laid on 12 December 1871 by Bishop Lanigan. Lanigan had been appointed the bishop of Goulburn in 1867 and was consecrated in the brick Saints Peter and Paul's. It was the first time in Australia a bishop was consecrated in his own diocese. The nave was the design of Andrea Stombuco. The materials and traditional Gothic design reflected his personal knowledge of European architecture, his skills and his influence. It was opened and blessed by Archbishop Bede Polding on 17 November 1872 costing A£3,500. The cathedral nave was built around the church nave, which was later demolished and removed through the cathedral doors. The sanctuary was still in use at this time and presumably a similar procedure was followed after the completion of the transepts and sanctuary.

On 15 May 1887 the foundation stone was laid for additions consisting of transepts, sanctuary, chapel, sacristy and tower. This section was designed by Charles Spadacini. It was reported that the church altar was reused in the new cathedral Sanctuary. These additions were opened and blessed by Cardinal Patrick Francis Moran on 29 June 1890 having cost A£13,575. The bells were installed in the tower and the Hills organ was opened in the same year.

The organ was the gift of the Dagleish family and was installed in the north east transept. On 25 April 1898 the cathedral was dedicated by Cardinal Moran. The stone used for the cathedral was of different types, including diorite porphyrite, a very hard green stone from a quarry on Bungonia Road near the junction of Rosemont Road. It is reputedly found in very limited quantities in only one place near Goulburn. In 1928 during work on the altar walls the murals were painted over. These were rich in quality and design, European in character and stylistically not found in the Australia. The architect for the 1927-28 renovations was William Wardell. In the 1950s and 1960s Canberra was established as the regional centre and Goulburn began to decline.

The transfer of the diocesan centre to Canberra in 1969 resulted in Saints Peter and Paul's becoming a parish church and no longer a cathedral.

== Description ==
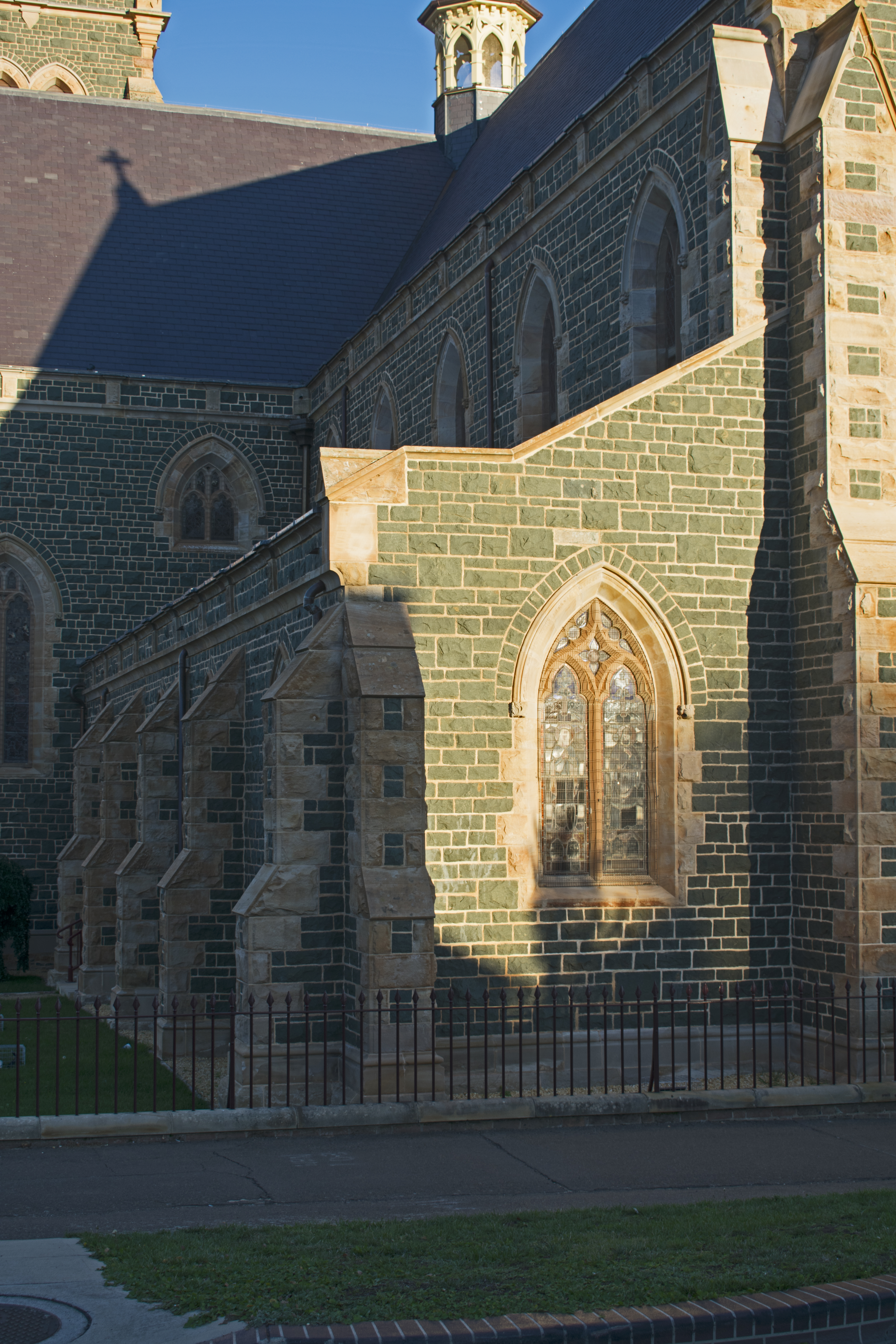
A window

The former cathedral is part of the Roman Catholic Church Group on the Vernor/Bourke/Clinton Streets block, comprising the former cathedral, bishop's residence, brick-and-iron front fence, former St Brigid's School, Mercy Convent and school.

The former cathedral is a Victorian Gothic Revival building built in two stages around the original 1843 church. It has a classical cruciform plan with aisles flanking the nave, and a tower in the north east corner. Footings are of rubble stone, rendered above ground level. The base stringcourses and quoins use sandstone from the Morowollen quarries near Wingello, Marulan. Tracery of all windows, jambs, arches, turrets and crosses are of "Piedmont" stone from Sydney and are generally in good condition, indicating the durability of the material. The walls are constructed from green porphyry, a particularly hard igneous rock that has been squared and brought to courses of 300 millimetres (12 in) in height. The CMP notes that the greenstone, diorite porphyrite, is from a quarry on the Bungonia Road and is only found in very limited quantities and in one place near Goulburn.

The roof is finished in deep purple slate from Bangore in Wales, and a fleche or lantern sits above the ridgeline where the nave and transepts cross, hiding the difference in roof heights. The Gothic architectural expression is especially evident in the windows and doors. The pinnacles of each part of the roof and gables are surmounted by either stone crosses or other decorative finials. Documentation indicates that there was a finial on every point, that each was different and that many are now missing, including to the top of the pinnacles on the four corners of the tower.

Statues either side of the front (west) gable represent St Peter and St Paul. There is a wrought iron picket fence to Bourke and Verner streets, with the former section believed to be original and the Verner St section having been rebuilt from elements of the original.

Internally

The interior has been described as follows:

"On entering the Bourke Street door the visitor beholds an unbroken space of 141 ft long by 33 ft wide. On either side of the nave there are aisles 75 ft by 14 ft, the aisles being divided from the nave by slender moulded columns of Victorian bluestone from Malmsbury. An arch at the end of the aisles opens into the transepts, which are 33 by 30 feet. A corresponding arch on the opposite sides leads to two small chapels. The roof is ceiled with wood divided into bays, and under the principals there are large traceried spandrels of timber resting on columns with caps and bases, these again resting on moulded corbels, all done in keen cement. The ceiling between the principals is divided into three panels, with a different description of wood in each and again relieved by beads and scotias of other and different woods." (Carolyn Cox)

The floor in the nave is a suspended concrete slab with hardwood parquetry. The sanctuary and side aisles are also concrete and now paved with marble. Internal pillars were made from Victoria Malmsbury bluestone that had been transported from Victoria at great cost, and personally shaped and designed by Stombuco as slender structural features. These have since been coated with a sand-rich paint. The internal wall finish is rendered and painted, although the sanctuary walls are lined to door head height with imported Italian marble.

The organ was built by Hill and Sons, London in 1890 and is considered to be the best Hill organ in Australia after the one in the Sydney Town Hall. It is described as having 3 manuals, 28 speaking stops, barker lever & mechanical action.

The interior joinery demonstrates a high degree of craftsmanship. Decorative elements including roses, gothic arches etc. repeat throughout the confessionals, galleries, choir, convent, screen, pulpit and pews. Brass altar rails added in 1928 are substantial and impressive. In the sanctuary area the earlier gas or electric brass fittings are still evident. The sanctuary walls are cream with gold leaf monograms. The walls of the nave and aisles are also cream with some gold leaf detail to window architraves and picture rails. The altar is understood to have been the one that was initially installed in the former brick church that occupied the site.

=== Condition ===
The condition of the building reportedly varied as at 13 November 2008. In general it is good although there are adverse effects resulting from a long history of rising damp. There are historic references to a spring being discovered under the building during its construction and unfortunately at that time the sanctuary footings were filled with building rubble to support the organ gallery and marble floors located above. The fill is believed to have acted as a conduit, enabling moisture to rise into the sanctuary floor and some of the surrounding sandstone. Recent excavation under the sanctuary is understood to have significantly reduced the damp although there remains some evidence of active groundwater. As a result of the damp there has been considerable fretting of sandstone at ground level.

A survey in 1985 found: some settlement of footings to the south-west side, serious fretting and deterioration to the Verner Street steps and adjacent foundation walls, high moisture levels in ground and footings, some movement of the tower, fretting of mortar, movement of walls, cracking and possible roof spreading, lifting of sandstone copings, breakdown of flashing and poor roof plumbing.

The greenstone church was constructed over the former 1843-47 brick church, the footings of which remain beneath the present building. From the excavated area beneath the sanctuary the stone footings of the former brick church are clearly evident. The sanctuary, which contains the remains of Bishops William Lanigan and John Gallagher, has been completely excavated and underpinned. The two sarcophagi are being preserved in their original location.

The integrity of the building's exterior is very high, there having been little change to significant form or fabric since its completion in the 1890s. The interior has been painted in the 1950s and the floors have been altered to address decay and rising damp. Modifications have been made to the sanctuary. The Hill and Sons organ is considered to have very high integrity.

=== Modifications and dates ===
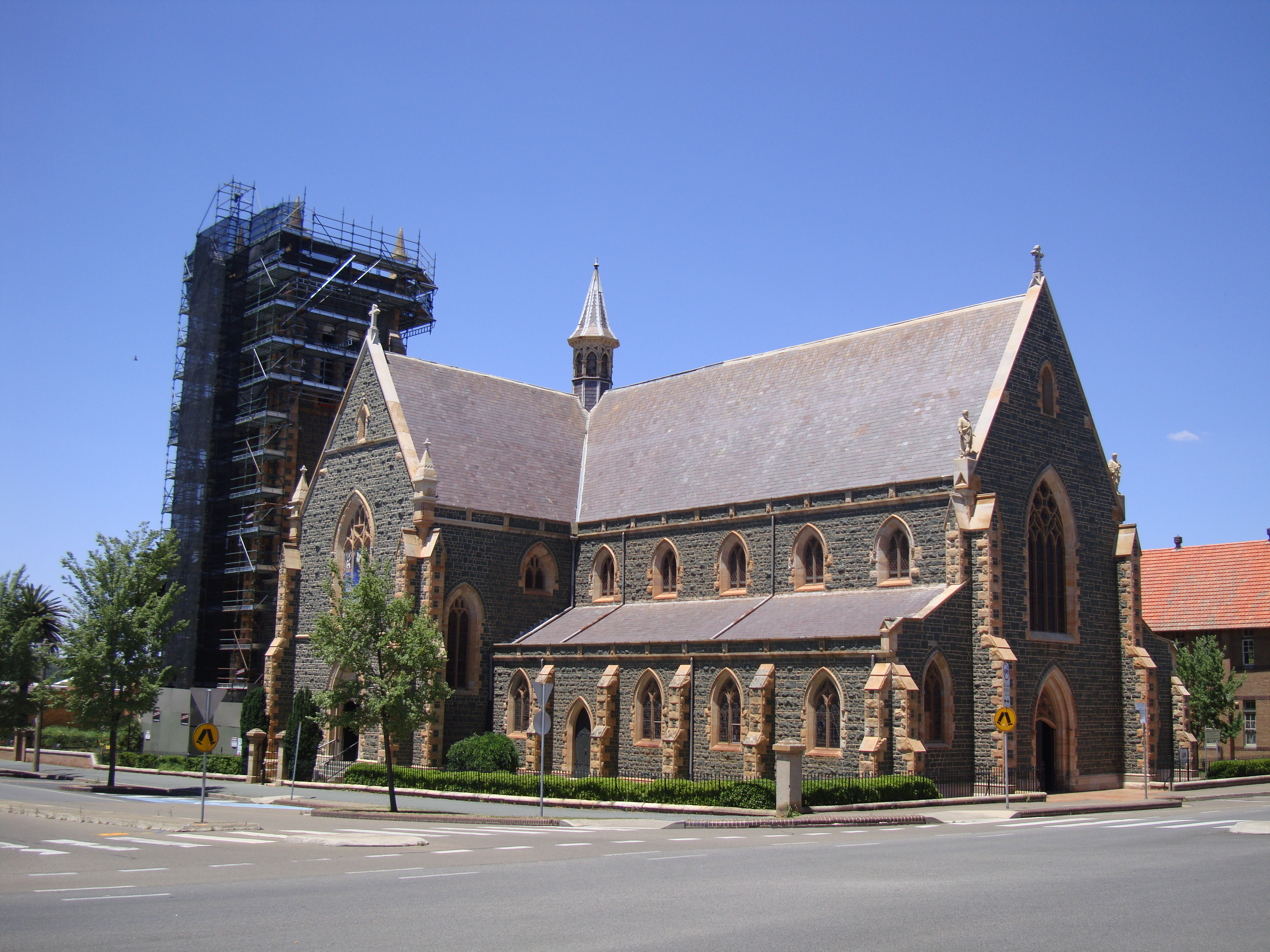
Sts and Peter and Paul's Old Cathedral, pictured in 2012, undergoing restoration

- 1890–1920: Murals added
- 1927–28: Renovations to the cathedral by architect William Wardell (presumed to be the son of William Wardell architect of Sydney in the latter half of the 19th century). Restoration was carried out by Ernest Mills and Sons of Sydney including framing of the doors at both entrances, confessionals, pulpit, Bishop's Throne, organ loft and choir front. Timber for framing and seats was "Calantis" (F Flynn pers comm). Other works included new marble flooring to the sanctuary (by Melocco Bros) and a new concrete floor with parquetry finish to replace the rotted timber floor in the nave. The sanctuary was walled in marble and a new marble high altar and side altars were added. The 1890s high altar was reconstructed along with new timberwork to the choir and organ galleries, confessionals and pews. The original cast iron rail from the sanctuary was removed and replaced by brass. Murals on the altar wall were painted over.
- 1952–57: Renovation and redecoration to the interior of the cathedral by architect Louis Burns, with work undertaken by Sydney contractor John Porteous. Gold leaf applied around archways and the sanctuary decorated with monograms of the holy name in gold.
- 1957: Rubber matting laid down over the parquetry floor along the aisles and the Victorian Malmsbury bluestone columns were painted and "sanded" to imitate sandstone.
- 1977: Repairs and maintenance including repairs to roof gutters and flashing and a course of "Vandex" injection treatment to walls and columns.
- 1991: Underpinning of Bourke Street wall by Claudio Bagnara.
- 1994: Strengthening of timber trusses in ceiling cavity.
- 2000: Chapel of Mary, Star of the Cross added.
- 2001 Construction of narthex and two rooms along Bourke Street wall.
- 2003: Further construction to narthex.
- 2004–06: Fill excavated from beneath the sanctuary, and underpinning of the sanctuary floor.

== Heritage listing ==
The former cathedral is a significant example of 19th-century Gothic ecclesiastical design and craftsmanship. The former Saints Peter and Paul's Cathedral provides physical evidence of Goulburn as a major ecclesiastical centre in the latter half of the 19th century. The cathedral is historically significant for its close association with the development of Catholicism in southern NSW. The building has association with Bishop Polding, Cardinal Moran and Bishop Lanigan, three men of significance in the development of the Catholic Church in Australia. The building represents a good example of the work of Andrea Stombuco the architect for the building.

The cathedral has a high degree of aesthetic value. Externally the Gothic architectural form is skilfully expressed in green porphyrite stone walls and sandstone detailing in combination with the dark purple slate roof. Internally imported stained glass windows framed by stone tracery, the internal timber-work and the historic altar together enhance the beauty of the internal space and demonstrate technical excellence within the crafts.

Saints Peter and Paul's is notable within the city, has streetscape value and makes important contribution to Goulburn's collection of 19th and 20th century architecture.

The use of locally quarried green porphyrite is technically of interest as a rare use of this material in such a quantity and in the quality of workmanship. The process of construction is technically interesting and has been documented in Church archives. There is future research potential in both the construction method and construction material.

The place has significance to the Catholic community of Goulburn and the wider Catholic Diocese both for social and spiritual reasons.

Moveable Collection

The William Hill & Son organ, a gift of the Dalgleish family, was installed in the north-east transept and opened to attendees in 1890. The organ is considered to be highly intact and considered one of the best-preserved Hill organs in Australia.

St Peter and Paul's Former Cathedral was listed on the New South Wales State Heritage Register on 20 April 2009 having satisfied the following criteria.

The place is important in demonstrating the course, or pattern, of cultural or natural history in New South Wales.

The former Saints Peter and Paul's Cathedral is historically significant for the important role it played in the growth and consolidation of Catholicism in southern New South Wales. It provides physical evidence of Goulburn as a major ecclesiastical centre in the latter half of the 19th century and the emergence of Goulburn as the main commercial and administrative centre in the region. As the growing congregation undertook an ambitious building program in subsequent decades with the erection of schools, orphanages, convents, hospitals and the presbytery, the cathedral played an essential role as its focal point. The cathedral remained the heart of the diocese until 1969, when the pro cathedral became St Christophers in Manuka and St Peter and Paul's became a parish church.

The place has a strong or special association with a person, or group of persons, of importance of cultural or natural history of New South Wales's history.

The former cathedral has important associations with key figures in the Catholic Church in New South Wales. Bishop Polding, the first Catholic bishop of the colony, selected the site for the church in 1840 and later, as archbishop, blessed and opened the nave following its completion in 1872. Cardinal Moran laid the foundation stone for the sanctuary in 1887, opened and blessed the cathedral in 1890 and dedicated it in 1898.

Its construction was largely due to Bishop Lanigan who served the Catholic community for many years and is buried beneath the sanctuary. Sts Peter and Paul's Cathedral was the only cathedral in Australia entirely built and consecrated under the one Bishop.

The building has association with Italian-born Andrea Stombuco, the diocesan architect. As well as designing the building he project managed construction of the nave and personally carved some of the fine stonework tracery. He is said to have designed buildings in every state of Australia except South Australia, with commissions from modest timber dwellings to large institutions and commercial buildings. His most important client was the Roman Catholic Church.

The place is important in demonstrating aesthetic characteristics and/or a high degree of creative or technical achievement in New South Wales.

The cathedral has a high degree of aesthetic value. Externally the Gothic architectural form is skilfully expressed in a combination of form, detail, texture and colour; rare green porphyrite stone walls, yellow sandstone detailing together with the dark purple slate roof. The church contains many fine imported stained glass windows which are framed by stone tracery. The main space is flanked by two aisles defined by elegantly proportioned columns, timber ceiling and trusses and the historic altar together enhance the beauty of the internal space and demonstrate technical excellence within the crafts.

Saints Peter and Paul's scale, form and proportion make it a significant landmark in Goulburn. Its landmark status is enhanced by its central location within the "Catholic Precinct" that comprises the former Bishop's House, former St Brigid's School, the Convent and school and St Patrick's former school. Its corner location, opposite the School of Music and within the sight lines of the Anglican Cathedral Church of St Saviour, all serve to reinforce the landmark significance of the building.

The place has strong or special association with a particular community or cultural group in New South Wales for social, cultural or spiritual reasons.

The place has significance to the Catholic community of Goulburn and the wider Catholic Diocese both for social and spiritual reasons. Catholic religious practice has been conducted on the St Peter and Paul's site since 1847. For the large Catholic community in Goulburn and the wider Diocese it has been the focus for many of their important religious ceremonies and has benefited from gifts and dedications, including the donation of the Hill and Sons organ by Mrs Dalgleish. The community have undertaken protective care of the building since its construction with several major phases of work, particularly in the 1920s and 1950s. Commitment to the building's care remains undiminished with work undertaken in 2005/6 and further major work planned for the years beyond.

The place has potential to yield information that will contribute to an understanding of the cultural or natural history of New South Wales.

The use of locally quarried green porphyrite is technically of interest as a rare use of this material in such a quantity and in the quality of workmanship. The green porphyrite used in the former cathedral was quarried 8 kilometres (5.0 mi) south east of Goulburn. The stone is not known to have been used elsewhere is such scale and with such quality of workmanship. There are three smaller buildings in Goulburn which also built of the stone but none are of such scale and stature. Other churches have used porphyritic stone in varying quantities but no other green examples are known. The process of construction of the former cathedral is technically interesting and has been well documented in Church archives. There is future research potential in both the construction method and construction material. The building is potentially technically valuable as an assessment of the stone's performance over time could provides comparison with stones from the same and other quarries.

The place possesses uncommon, rare or endangered aspects of the cultural or natural history of New South Wales.

The former cathedral is a not rare although the use of green porphyrite stone as a building material is unusual.

The place is important in demonstrating the principal characteristics of a class of cultural or natural places/environments in New South Wales.

The Saints Peter and Paul's Former Cathedral is a fine example of Gothic style ecclesiastical architecture. The form, design and detail demonstrate the key characteristics of this type of building.

== See also ==
- List of Roman Catholic churches in New South Wales
