= Assuras =

- Zanfour
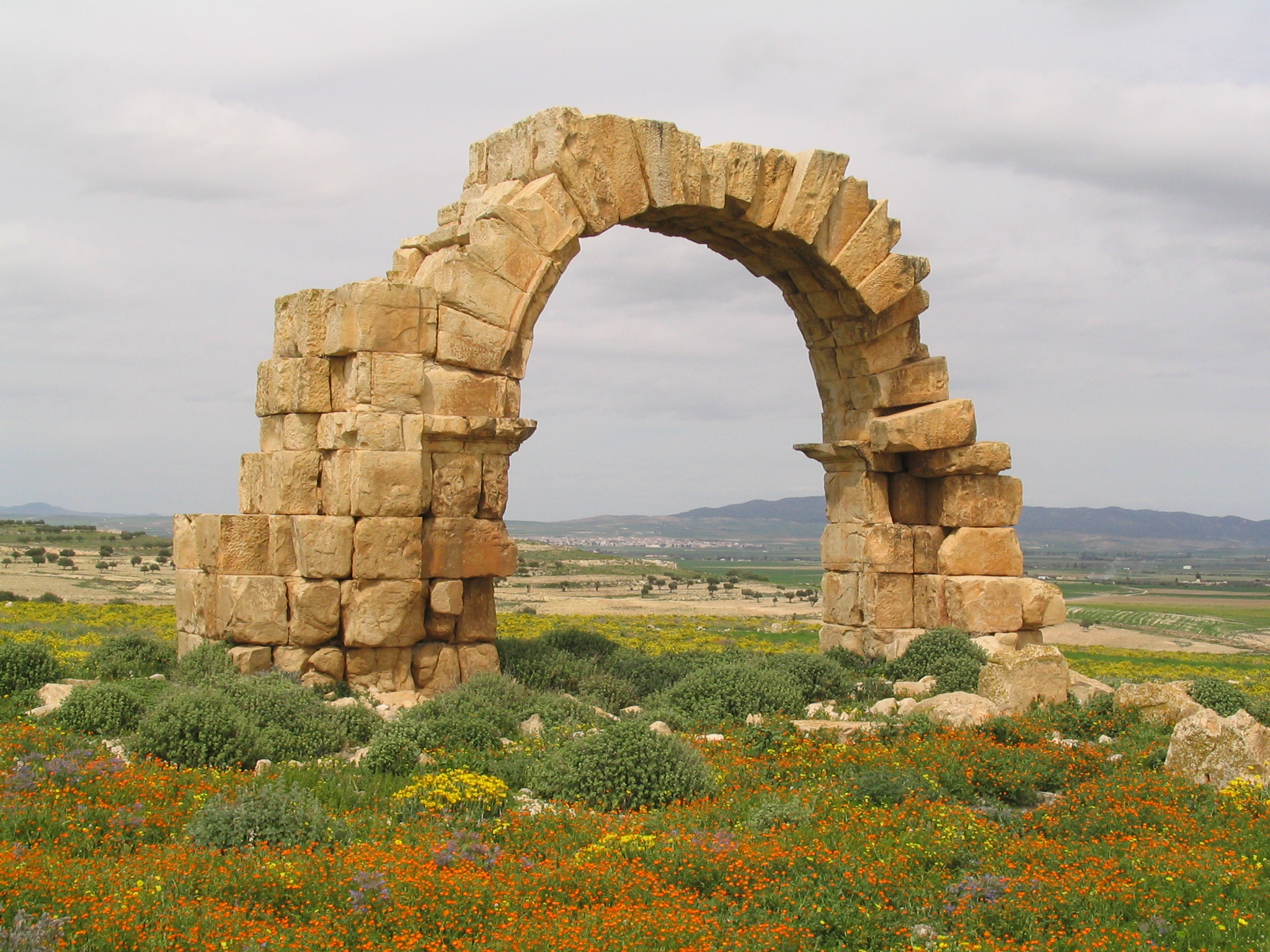
- Ruins at Assuras
- Interactive map of Assuras
- 35.994419°N 9.020551°E
- Region: Tunisia

Site notes
- Elevation: 620 m (2,030 ft)

Assuras, sometimes given as Assura or Assur, was a town in the Roman province of Proconsular Africa.

Ruins of its temples and theatres and other public buildings are at Henchir-Zenfour.

== Bishopric ==
At an early stage Assuras became the centre of a Christian diocese. Records are extant of the names of seven of its bishops. The first of these is Fortunatianus. He was deposed because of defecting from the Catholic faith in the Decian persecution. Saint Cyprian of Carthage speaks of him in a letter that he wrote to the Christians of Assuras in about 252, which shows that he tried to recover the see from which he had been driven. He was replaced by Epictetus, who died before 256, the year in which his successor Victor took part in a council at Carthage convoked by Cyprian to deal with the problem of the lapsi.

Praetextatus was at the council held at Cabarsussi in 393 by a breakaway group of Donatists led by Maximianus and signed its acts. The participants were condemned in the following year by a council that the main Donatist body, which recognized Primianus as Bishop of Carthage, held at Bagai. Saint Augustine says Praetextatus was one of the twelve bishops who consecrated Maximianus as Bishop of Carthage.

The successor of Praetextatus, Rogatus, was converted to the Catholic faith some time after 397.

The Catholic Bishop of Assuras Evangelus took part in councils held at Carthage in 397, 401, and 411. The last of these was a meeting of Catholic and Donatist bishops, but Assuras was represented only by Evangelus, since the Donatist bishop of the town had died shortly before.

The last Bishop of Assuras known by name was Peregrinus, who was one of the Catholic bishops summoned to a meeting in Carthage in 484 by the Vandal King Huneric and then exiled to Sardinia.

Assuras is still mentioned as a bishopric in an early 8th-century Byzantine Notitiae Episcopatuum of the Patriarchate of Alexandria.

No longer a residential diocese, Assuras is today listed by the Catholic Church as a titular see.
