= Giovanni Panico =

Italian cardinal

His Eminence Giovanni Panico
- Cardinal-Priest of Santa Teresa d'Avila
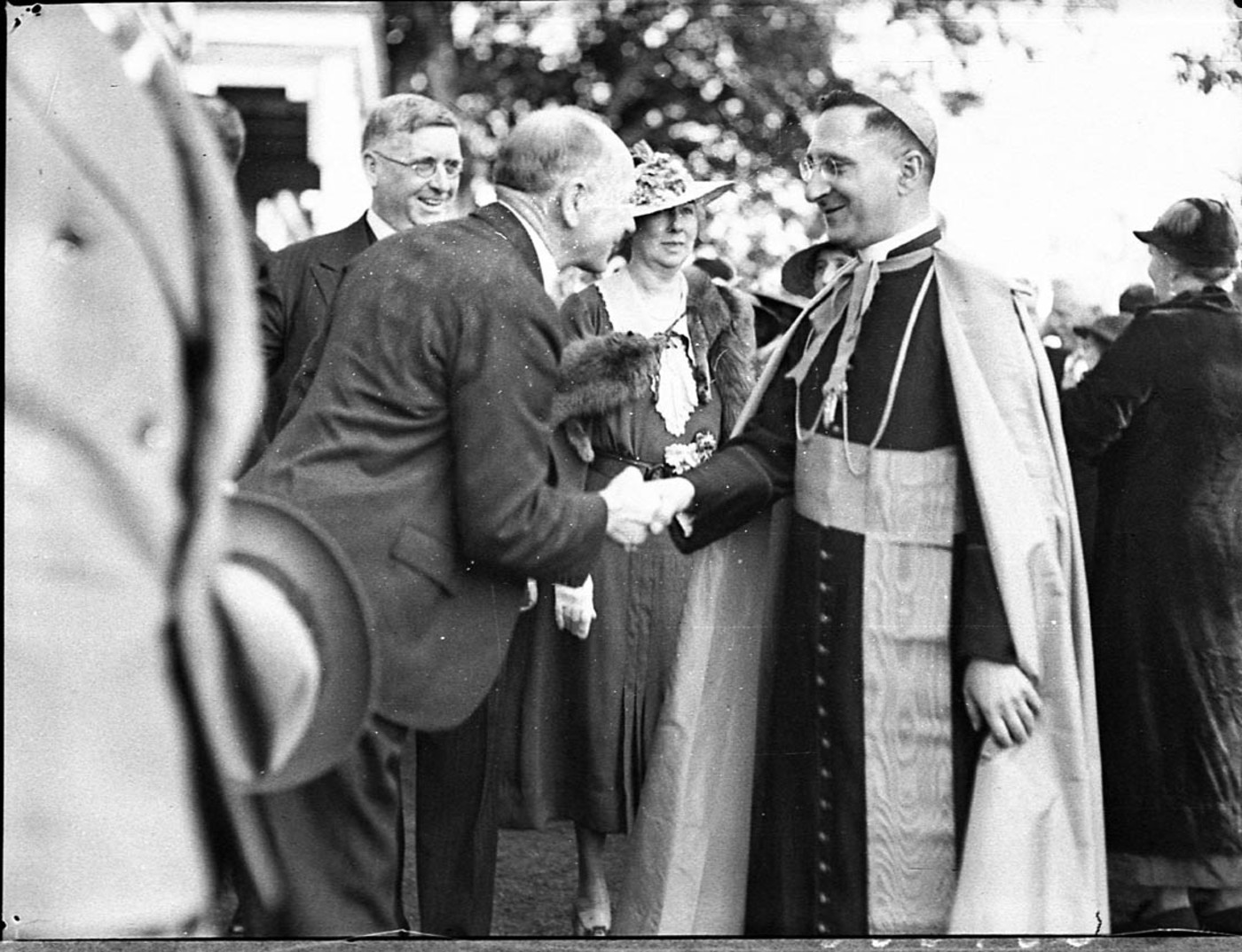
- Panico at a garden party in Sydney in 1936
- Installed: 17 October 1935
- Term ended: 19 March 1962
- Successor: Aurelio Sabattani
- Other post: Titular Archbishop of Justiniana Prima (1935–1962)

Orders
- Ordination: 14 March 1919 by Cardinal Basilio Pompili
- Consecration: 8 December 1935 by Cardinal Pietro Fumasoni Biondi
- Created cardinal: 19 March 1962
- Rank: Cardinal Priest

Personal details
- Born: Santo Giovanni Panico; 12 April 1895 Tricase, Lecce, Kingdom of Italy
- Died: 12 July 1962 (aged 67) Tricase, Lecce, Italy
- Parents: Carmine Panico & Marina Zocco
- Education: Pontifical Gregorian University (1910–1915), Pontifical Roman Seminary (1915–1919) & Pontifical Lateran University (1919–1922)
- Motto: Respice stellam

Styles of Giovanni Panico
- Reference style: His Eminence
- Spoken style: Your Eminence
- Informal style: Cardinal
- See: Justiniana Prima (titular see)

Giovanni Panico (12 April 1895 – 7 July 1962) was an Italian cardinal of the Catholic Church. He served as nuncio to several countries during his career, and was created a cardinal in 1962.

== Life ==
=== Early life ===
Panico was born in Tricase, in the Province of Lecce, to Carmine Panico and his wife Marina Zocco, a farming family. The sixth of eleven children, he was given the baptismal name was Santo Giovanni. After studying under a private tutor, he attended the minor seminary in Ugento. He then went to Rome, where he lived in the Leonine College, a residence for students from southern Italy at the Gregorian University (1910–1915), then studied at the Pontifical Roman Seminary (1915–1919). An accomplished musician on both the organ and the piano, he was the official organist for the seminary during his time there.

Panico was ordained to the priesthood by Cardinal Basilio Pompili on 14 March 1919, in the Lateran Basilica. That summer he founded a boys choir and a separate girls choir for the children of Rome. He then attended the Pontifical Lateran University until 1922, obtaining a doctorate in theology in 1919, and later a doctorate in canon and civil law in 1922.

=== Career ===
Panico then did pastoral work in his home town from 1922 to 1923, and was raised to the rank of Privy Chamberlain of His Holiness on 25 August 1923. Invited by the Cardinal Secretary of State to join the papal diplomatic service, he was appointed the auditor of the nunciature for Argentina (1926–1931) and for Czechoslovakia (1931–1932) before becoming the chargé d'affaires in Bavaria in 1932, and again in Czechoslovakia in 1933. During his time in Prague, he also contributed to the foundation of the University of Bratislava. He was created a Domestic Prelate of His Holiness on 20 August 1934, and later awarded the Legion of Honour by France.

On 17 October 1935, Panico was appointed Apostolic Delegate to Australia and New Zealand (a post he held until 1948) and Titular Archbishop of Justiniana Prima by Pope Pius XI. He received his consecration on the following 8 December from Cardinal Pietro Fumasoni Biondi, with Archbishops Bartolomeo Cattaneo and Domenico Spolvorini serving as co-consecrators, in Rome.

As Apostolic Delegate Panico believed that the time had arrived for the promotion of native-born priests as bishops for these countries, instead of Irish-born clergy. This was seen as a very controversial move in some quarters. Among supporters of the Irish Archbishop Daniel Mannix, Panico was known widely as "Panicky Jack". When in 1945 Norman Gilroy was appointed cardinal in preference to Mannix, the Australian government minister Arthur Calwell publicly criticised Panico, "whose limited ability and equally limited knowledge of Australia and Australians has ill-fitted him to influence the destinies of the Australian church".

Panico officiated at the Eucharistic Congress of 1938 which was held in Newcastle, New South Wales. He also presided over similar events in 1939 in Wellington, New Zealand, to mark the centenary of the Catholic Church in New Zealand (1838), and of the nation itself (the Treaty of Waitangi, 1840).

During World War II, Panico established charities for Italian, German, and Japanese prisoners of war in Australia and for the Australian and New Zealand prisoners in Italy.

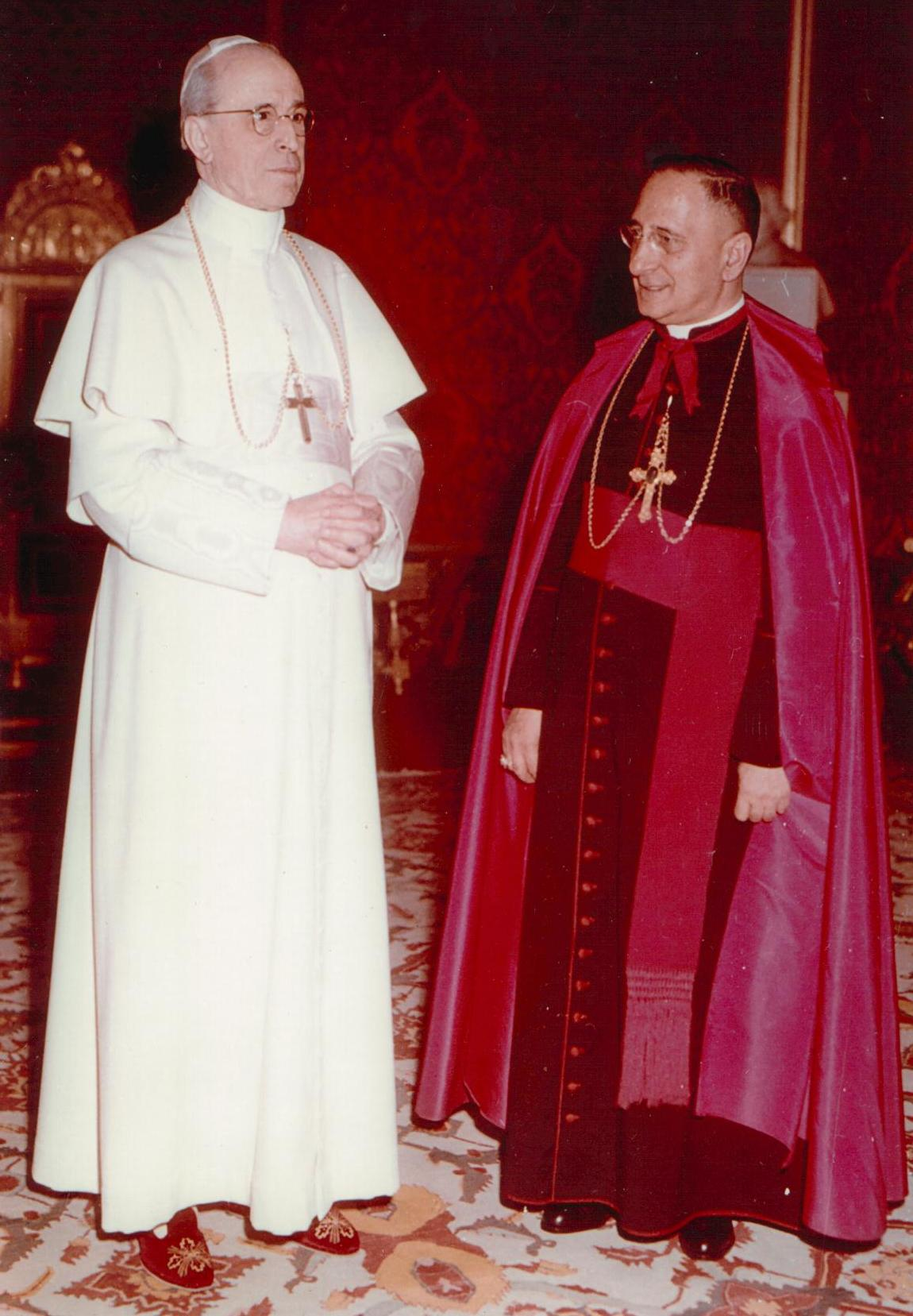
Panico in audience with Pope Pius XII

In 1948, Panico opened Holy Name Seminary in Christchurch, New Zealand. He traveled to New Zealand with Jesuit priests who were to staff it. Their arrival in New Zealand was dramatic as their ship, MS Wanganella, went aground on Barrett Reef at the entrance to Wellington Harbour, and they had to be rescued. The Jesuits were playing poker in their cabin at the time the ship hit the reef. Panico rushed into the cabin in his nightshirt and asked what was happening. When one of the Jesuits informed him that they were going to sink, he apparently told them that he must die like a priest so he went and put on his biretta. This was further fuel to his nickname of "Panicky Jack".

Panico was named nuncio to Peru on 28 September 1948, and Apostolic Delegate to Canada on 14 November 1953. Pope John XXIII appointed him nuncio to Portugal on 25 January 1959.

== Cardinal and last days ==
In March 1962, having suffered from poor health for several years, he was transferred to the Roman Curia and was promoted to the rank of cardinal priest in the consistory of 19 March 1962, with the Basilica of Santa Teresa d'Avila as his titular church. He then founded the Cardinale Giovanni Panico Hospital in his native Tricase, where he soon died at age 67.

Panico was originally buried in his family's plot in the town cemetery, but, in keeping with his request, his remains were later moved to the crypt of the Church of the Nativity of the Blessed Virgin Mary in the same town. On 23 June 2012, his remains were transferred to a tomb in front of the altar of St. Charles Borromeo in the main body of the church.
