= Bartolomeo Cattaneo =

Italian prelate

- Apostolic Delegate to Australia
- Church: Catholic Church
- In office: 16 May 1917 – January 1933
- Predecessor: Bonaventura Cerretti
- Successor: Filippo Bernardini
- Other post: Titular Archbishop of Palmyra (1917-1943)

Orders
- Ordination: 2 August 1891
- Consecration: 10 June 1917 by Domenico Serafini

Personal details
- Born: 26 September 1866 Novi Ligure, Province of Alessandria, Kingdom of Italy
- Died: 14 May 1943 (aged 76)

Bartolomeo Cattaneo (26 September 1866 – 14 May 1943) was an Italian prelate of the Catholic Church who served in the diplomatic service of the Holy See. He became an archbishop in 1917 and was Apostolic Delegate to Australia from 1917 to 1933.

== Biography ==
Bartolomeo Cattaneo was born on 26 September 1866 in Novi Ligure, Italy. He was ordained a priest on 2 August 1891. He studied at the Almo Collegio Capranica from 1889 to 1894.

He was Rector of the Pontificio Collegio Urbano de Propaganda Fide, the training institute for missionaries, when, on 16 May 1917, Pope Benedict XV appointed him Apostolic Delegate to Austrasia and titular archbishop of Palmyra. He received his episcopal consecration on 10 June 1917 from Cardinal Domenico Serafini. He was tasked with creating an indigenous hierarchy and priesthood as Pope Benedict had called for in his recent encyclical Maximum Illud and did so over the objections of local Irish bishops. In Australia, he was also friendly with local Italian fascist leaders.

His assignment in Australia ended early in 1933 when he was 66. (Note: His successor, Filippo Bernardini, was appointed on 16 March 1933.)

He died on 14 May 1943.
