= Ashi (disambiguation) =

Ashi is the Zoroastrian concept of "reward, recompense".

Ashi may also refer to:

- Ashi, Iran, a village in Iran
- Ashi River in China
- Rav Ashi, a Jewish religious scholar
- Ashi (title), a Bhutanese honorific title meaning "Lady"
- Ashi Productions, a Japanese anime studio
- Ashi, a fictional character in the fifth season of Samurai Jack

ASHI may also refer to:

- Amaya School of Home Industries, a vocational school in the Philippines
- American Safety and Health Institute
- American Society for Histocompatibility and Immunogenetics
- American Society of Home Inspectors
