= Tanza =

Municipality in Cavite, Philippines

Tanza Santa Cruz de Malabon
- Municipality
- Municipality of Tanza
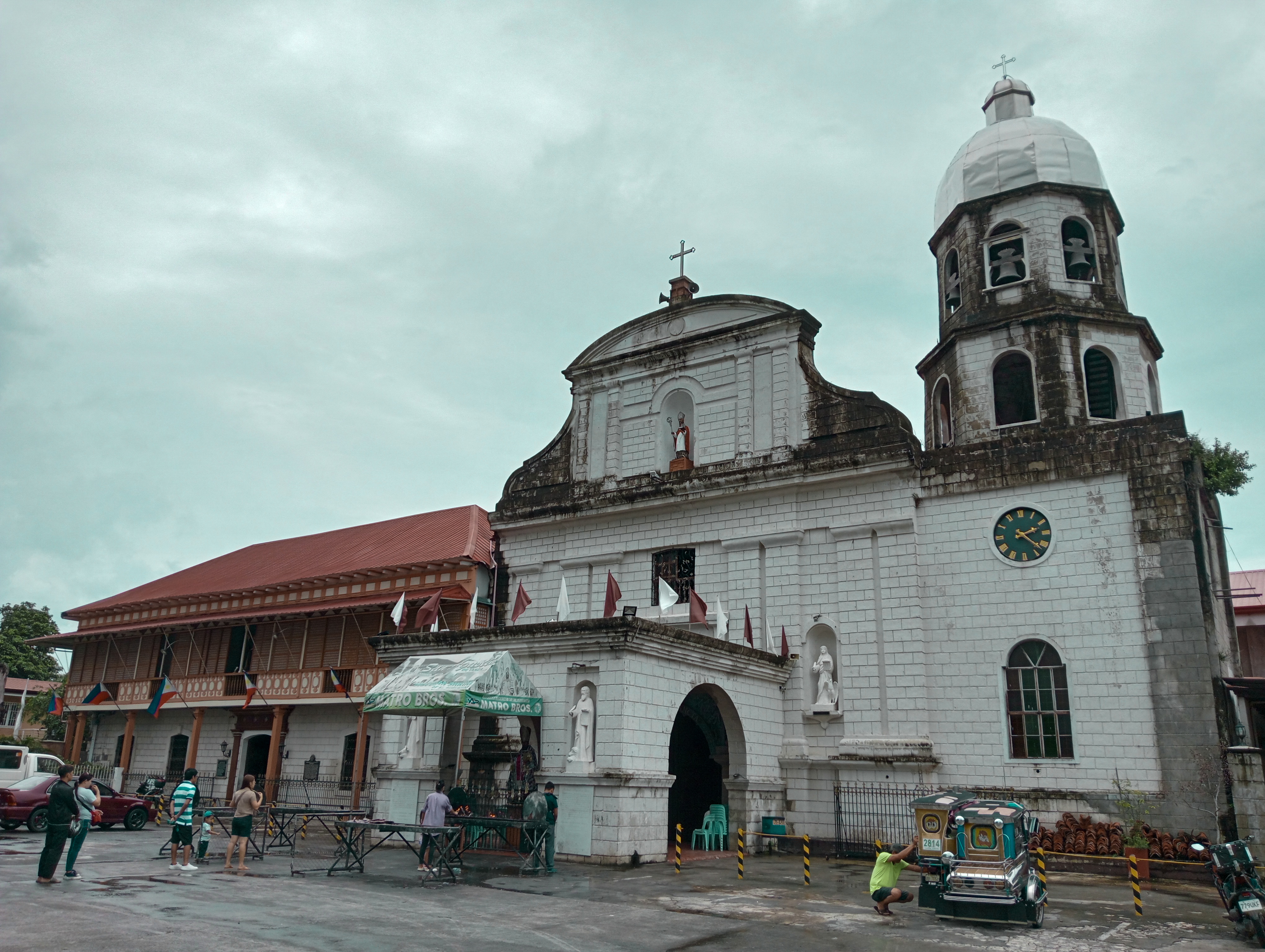
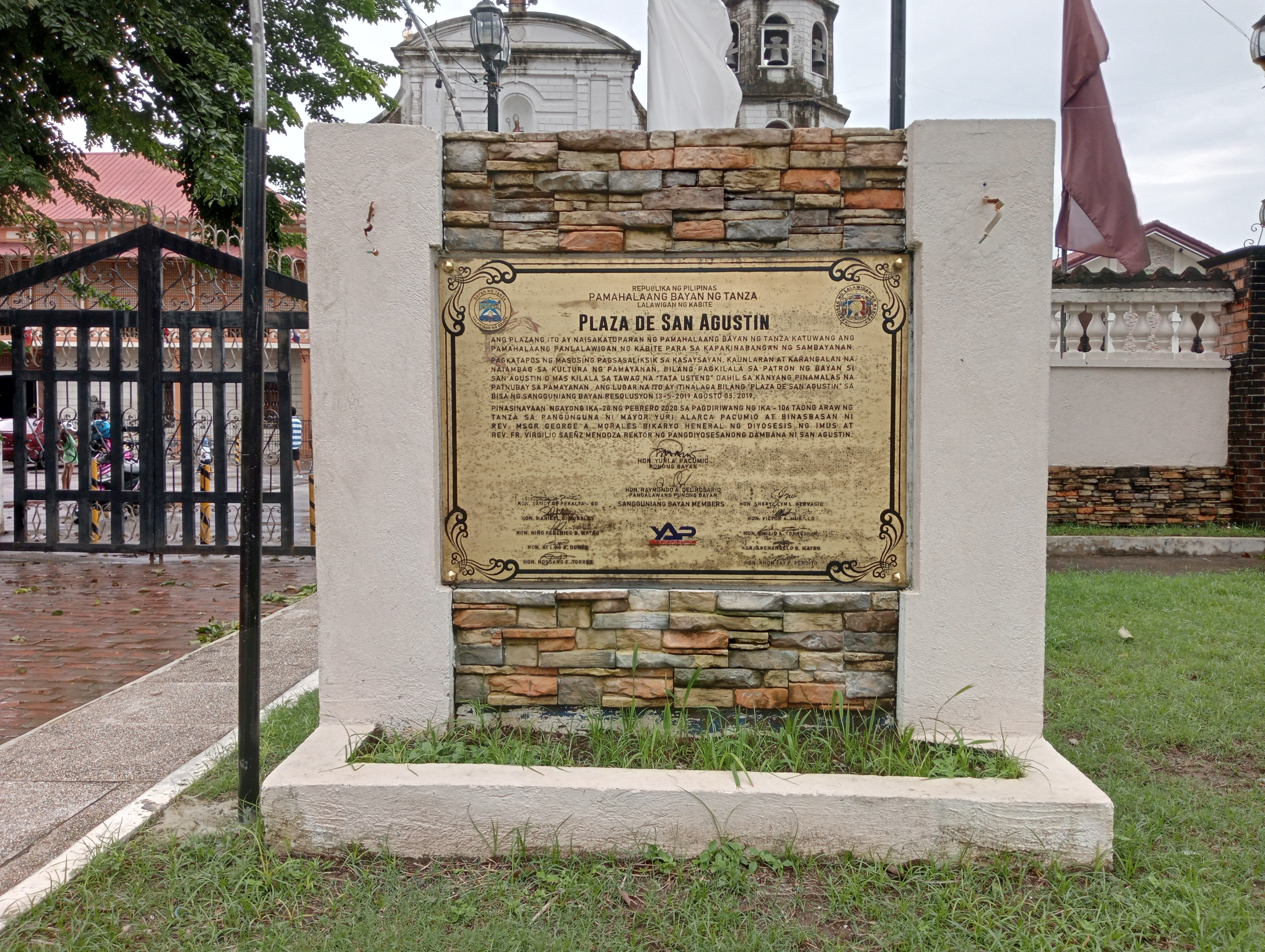
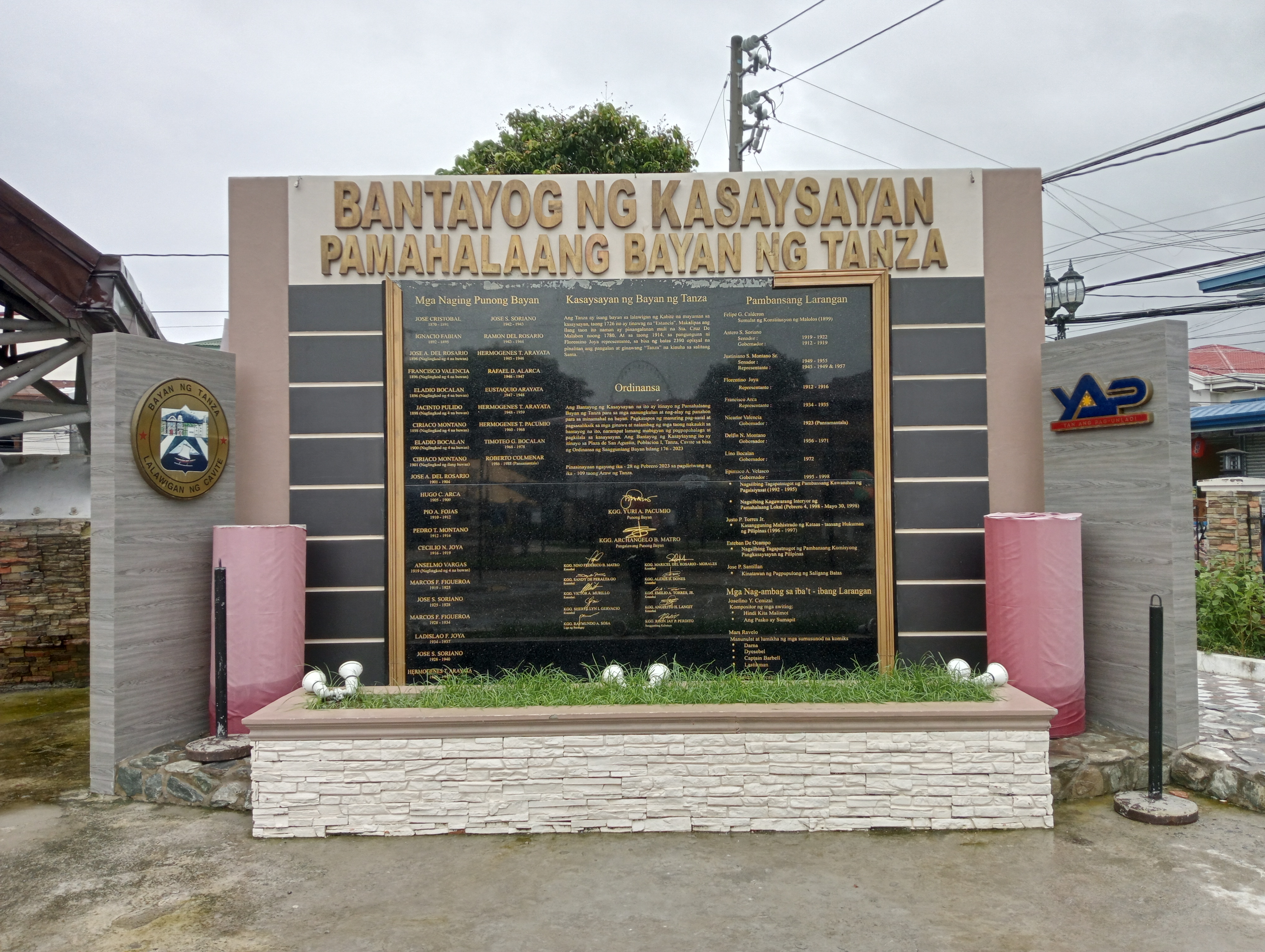
- Tanza Church Plaza de San Agustin Bantayog ng Kasaysayan Memorial Marker

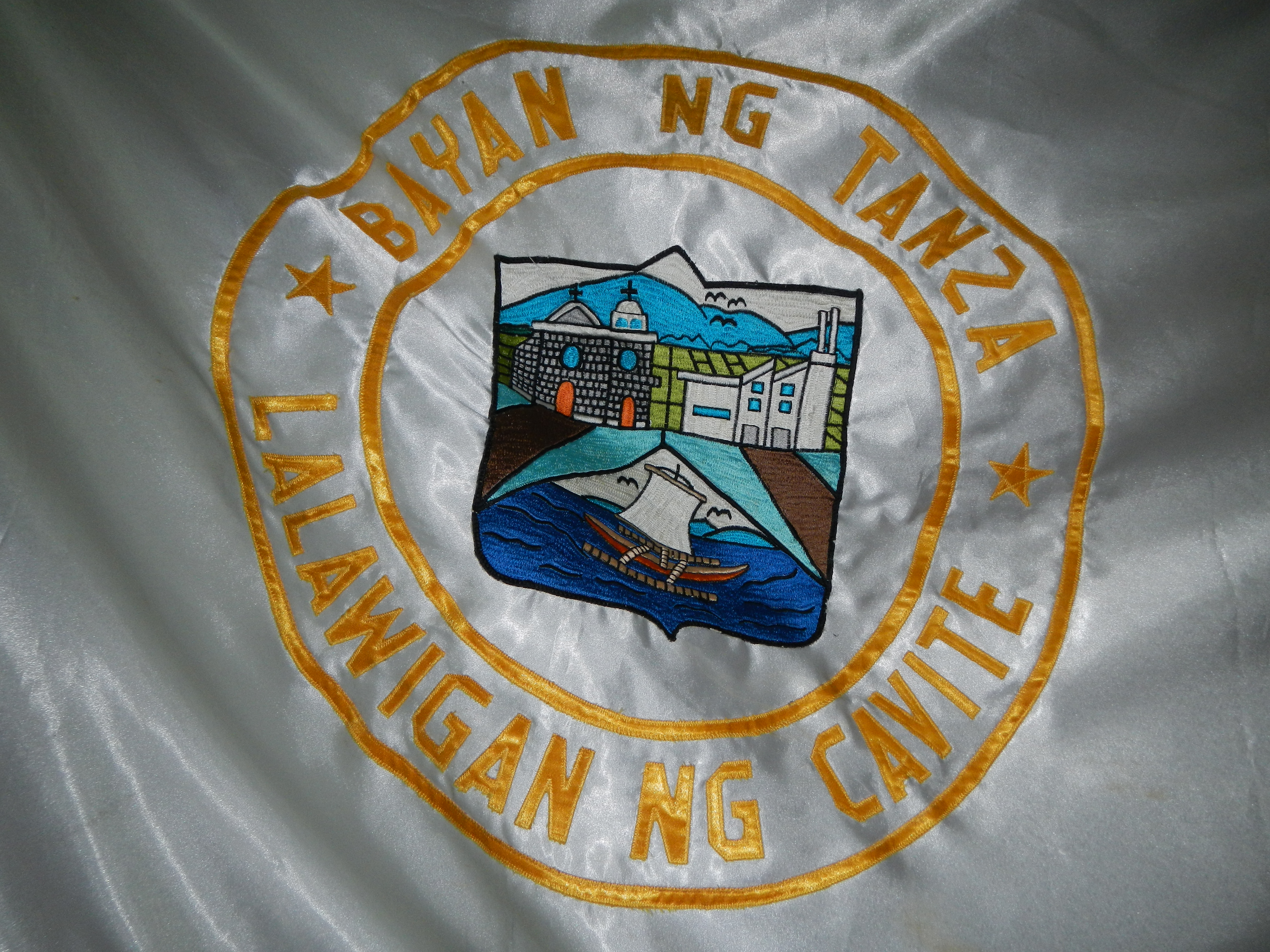
- Flag Seal
- Nickname: Heart of the Cavite Coast
- Mottoes: Filipino: Tanza: Serbisyo sa Mamamayan, Malasakit Para sa Bayan; English: (Tanza: Service to the People, Care for the Nation); Filipino: Isang Bayang Nagkakaisa, Isang Bayang May Pananampalataya; English: (A United Town, A Town with Faith)
- Anthem: Filipino: Tanza, Bayang Makasaysayan; English: (Tanza, Historic Town)
- Map of Cavite with Tanza highlighted
- Interactive map of Tanza
- Location within the Philippines
- Coordinates: 14°23′40″N 120°51′11″E
- Country: Philippines
- Region: Calabarzon
- Province: Cavite
- District: 7th district
- Founded: 1760
- Annexation to San Francisco de Malabon: October 15, 1903
- Chartered: 1910
- Renamed: February 28, 1914 (as Tanza)
- Barangays: 41 (see Barangays)

Government
  - Type: Councilors
  - Mayor: Archangelo B. Matro
  - Vice Mayor: Raymundo A. Del Rosario
  - Representative: Crispin Diego D. Remulla
  - Municipal Council: Members: Niño Federico B. Matro; Alexis B. Dones; Myron S. Ner; Ryan G. Mintu; Antonio A. Del Rosario; Concepcion Jocelyn D. Pangan; Sheryl Lyn L. Gervacio; Joselito P. Arca
  - Electorate: 166,873 voters (2025)

Area
  - Total: 78.33 km^{2} (30.24 sq mi)
- Elevation: 57 m (187 ft)
- Highest elevation: 642 m (2,106 ft)
- Lowest elevation: 0 m (0 ft)

Population (2024 census)
  - Total: 339,308
  - Density: 4,332/km^{2} (11,220/sq mi)
  - Households: 79,243
- Demonym(s): Tanzeño (masculine or neutral); Tanzeña (feminine)

Economy
  - Income class: 1st municipal income class
  - Poverty incidence: 8.28% (2023)
  - Revenue: ₱ 1,192 million (2024)
  - Assets: ₱ 1,887 million (2024)
  - Expenditure: ₱ 815.5 million (2024)
  - Liabilities: ₱ 520.7 million (2024)

Service provider
  - Electricity: Manila Electric Company (Meralco)
  - Water: Tanza Water District
- Time zone: UTC+8 (PST)
- ZIP code: 4108
- PSGC: 0402120000
- IDD : area code: +63 (0)46
- Native languages: Tagalog
- Major religions: Roman Catholicism; Protestantism; Islam
- Feast date: August 27 (Grand Karakol); August 28 (Town Fiesta)
- Catholic diocese: Diocese of Imus
- Patron saint: Holy Cross; Saint Augustine of Hippo
- Website: www.tanza.gov.ph

Tanza, officially the Municipality of Tanza (Tagalog: Bayan ng Tanza), is a municipality in the province of Cavite, Philippines. According to the 2024 census, it has a population of 339,308 people. It has a land area of 95.59 square kilometers (36.91 sq mi), making it the third largest municipality by land area in the province.

Tanza was awarded the "Seal of Good Financial Housekeeping" in 2011, 2012, 2018, 2019, and 2021 and the "Seal of Good Local Governance" in 2016 by the Department of the Interior and Local Government. The municipality was named 2014 most competitive in economic dynamism by the National Competitiveness Council, eighth most populous municipality (2015 NSO Census), and 15th largest Municipality Revenue Earner based on the 2016 Bureau of Local Government Finance Financial Report.

Tanza is the place where Emilio Aguinaldo was sworn in as the president of the revolutionary government of the Philippines, in front of the ancient Santa Cruz or Holy Cross (the titular of Tanza's main Catholic parish). Other officials elected at Tejeros Convention elections, including Mariano Trias as vice president, also took their oath with Aguinaldo. Also, Tanza was the birthplace of Felipe G. Calderon, the person who drafted the Malolos Constitution.

Tanza is the home of Cavite Gateway Terminal, the first roll-on, roll-off barge terminal in the Philippines.

== History ==
Tanza was formerly a strip of land incorporated for official purpose to the municipality of San Francisco de Malabon, now called General Trias. The first settlers were the Fabian brothers who migrated here. This place was particularly devoted to grazing and was called Estancia Santa Cruz de Malabon (1780).

The 1818 Spanish census showed the area had 2,090 native families and 3 Spanish-Filipino families.

In the mid-19th century, the Secularization movement that was largely centered in Santa Cruz de Malabón led by Pedro Pelaez.

On October 15, 1903, the Philippine Commission approved Act No. 947, annexing Santa Cruz de Malabon to the adjacent town of San Francisco de Malabon. In 1909, a resolution was passed by the San Francisco de Malabon municipal council to reconvert Santa Cruz de Malabon into a separate and independent municipality; it took effect in 1910.

In 1914, Florentino Joya, the then-representative of Cavite to the Philippine Assembly, worked for the passage of a bill which renamed the town of Santa Cruz de Malabon to Tanza by virtue of Philippine Legislative Act No. 2390 dated February 28, 1914.

== Geography ==
Tanza is among of the 23 cities and municipalities that comprise Cavite. It is located in the northwestern part of Cavite lying within latitudes 140° 24’ north and longitude 120° 51’ east. It is bounded by Rosario to the north; General Trias to the east; Trece Martires to the south, Naic to the south and west; and Manila Bay on the west. Tanza is 23 kilometres (14 mi) from Imus and 33 kilometres (21 mi) from Manila.

=== Barangays ===
Tanza is politically subdivided into 41 barangays, as indicated below. Each barangay consists of puroks and some have sitios.

- Amaya 1
- Amaya 2
- Amaya 3
- Amaya 4
- Amaya 5
- Amaya 6
- Amaya 7
- Bagtas
- Biga
- Biwas
- Bucal
- Bunga
- Calibuyo
- Capipisa
- Daang Amaya 1
- Daang Amaya 2
- Daang Amaya 3
- Halayhay
- Julugan 1
- Julugan 2
- Julugan 3
- Julugan 4
- Julugan 5
- Julugan 6
- Julugan 7
- Julugan 8
- Lambingan
- Mulawin
- Paradahan 1
- Paradahan 2
- Poblacion 1
- Poblacion 2
- Poblacion 3
- Poblacion 4
- Punta 1
- Punta 2
- Sahud Ulan
- Sanja Mayor
- Santol
- Tanauan
- Tres Cruses

=== Climate ===
Climate data for Tanza, Cavite
| Month | Jan | Feb | Mar | Apr | May | Jun | Jul | Aug | Sep | Oct | Nov | Dec | Year |
|---|---|---|---|---|---|---|---|---|---|---|---|---|---|
| Mean daily maximum °C (°F) | 29 (84) | 30 (86) | 32 (90) | 34 (93) | 32 (90) | 31 (88) | 29 (84) | 29 (84) | 29 (84) | 30 (86) | 30 (86) | 29 (84) | 30 (87) |
| Mean daily minimum °C (°F) | 21 (70) | 20 (68) | 21 (70) | 22 (72) | 24 (75) | 25 (77) | 24 (75) | 24 (75) | 24 (75) | 23 (73) | 22 (72) | 21 (70) | 23 (73) |
| Average precipitation mm (inches) | 10 (0.4) | 10 (0.4) | 12 (0.5) | 27 (1.1) | 94 (3.7) | 153 (6.0) | 206 (8.1) | 190 (7.5) | 179 (7.0) | 120 (4.7) | 54 (2.1) | 39 (1.5) | 1,094 (43) |
| Average rainy days | 5.2 | 4.5 | 6.4 | 9.2 | 19.7 | 24.3 | 26.9 | 25.7 | 24.4 | 21.0 | 12.9 | 9.1 | 189.3 |
Source: Meteoblue

== Demographics ==
Population census of Tanza
| Year | Pop. | ±% p.a. |
|---|---|---|
| 1903 | 8,792 | — |
| 1918 | 9,464 | +0.49% |
| 1939 | 16,328 | +2.63% |
| 1948 | 18,183 | +1.20% |
| 1960 | 24,256 | +2.43% |
| 1970 | 32,691 | +3.03% |
| 1975 | 37,353 | +2.71% |
| 1980 | 43,675 | +3.18% |
| 1990 | 61,785 | +3.53% |
| 1995 | 77,839 | +4.42% |
| 2000 | 110,517 | +7.80% |
| 2007 | 171,795 | +6.27% |
| 2010 | 188,755 | +3.49% |
| 2015 | 226,188 | +3.51% |
| 2020 | 312,116 | +7.01% |
| 2024 | 339,308 | +2.03% |
Source: Philippine Statistics Authority

In the 2024 census, the population of Tanza was 339,308 people, with a density of 3,500 inhabitants per square kilometer or 9,100 inhabitants per square mile.

=== Religion ===
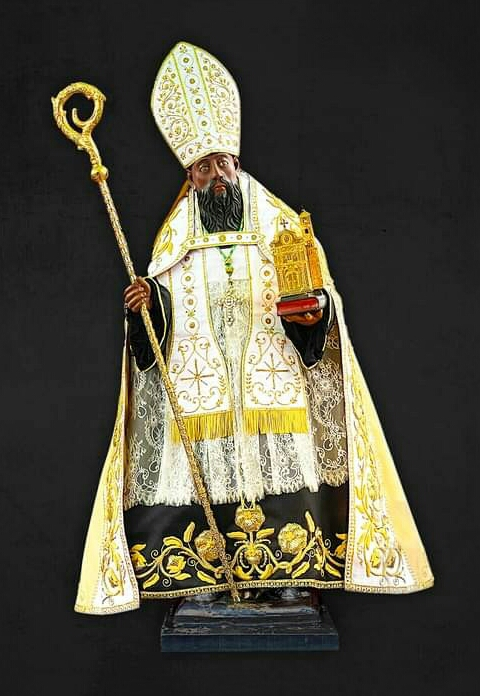
Saint Augustine of Hippo, patron saint of Tanza

==== Christianity ====
The majority of the people of Tanza are Roman Catholic under the jurisdiction of the Diocese of Imus, but there has been fast growth of Protestant and other non-Catholic denominations in the town, including Iglesia ni Cristo, Baptist, Seventh-day Adventist, Jehovah's Witnesses, Members Church of God International, and the Church of Jesus Christ of Latter-day Saints.

==== Islam ====
With the influx of migrants from other provinces especially from Mindanao, other non-Christian faiths particularly Islam are practiced in the town.

==== Other faiths ====
Non-Abrahamic faiths include native-Tagalog Anitism, Animism, and within the local Indian and Chinese communities Hinduism, Buddhism, Taoism and Confucianism are followed.

=== Languages ===
The main languages spoken are Tagalog, and English. A large number of people from farther provinces have migrated to Tanza, resulting in minor but significant usage of the Bicolano, Cebuano, Ilocano, Hiligaynon and Waray languages.

== Economy ==
=== Poverty incidence ===
Poverty incidence of Tanza (%)

Source: Philippine Statistics Authority

=== Retail and business process outsourcing ===
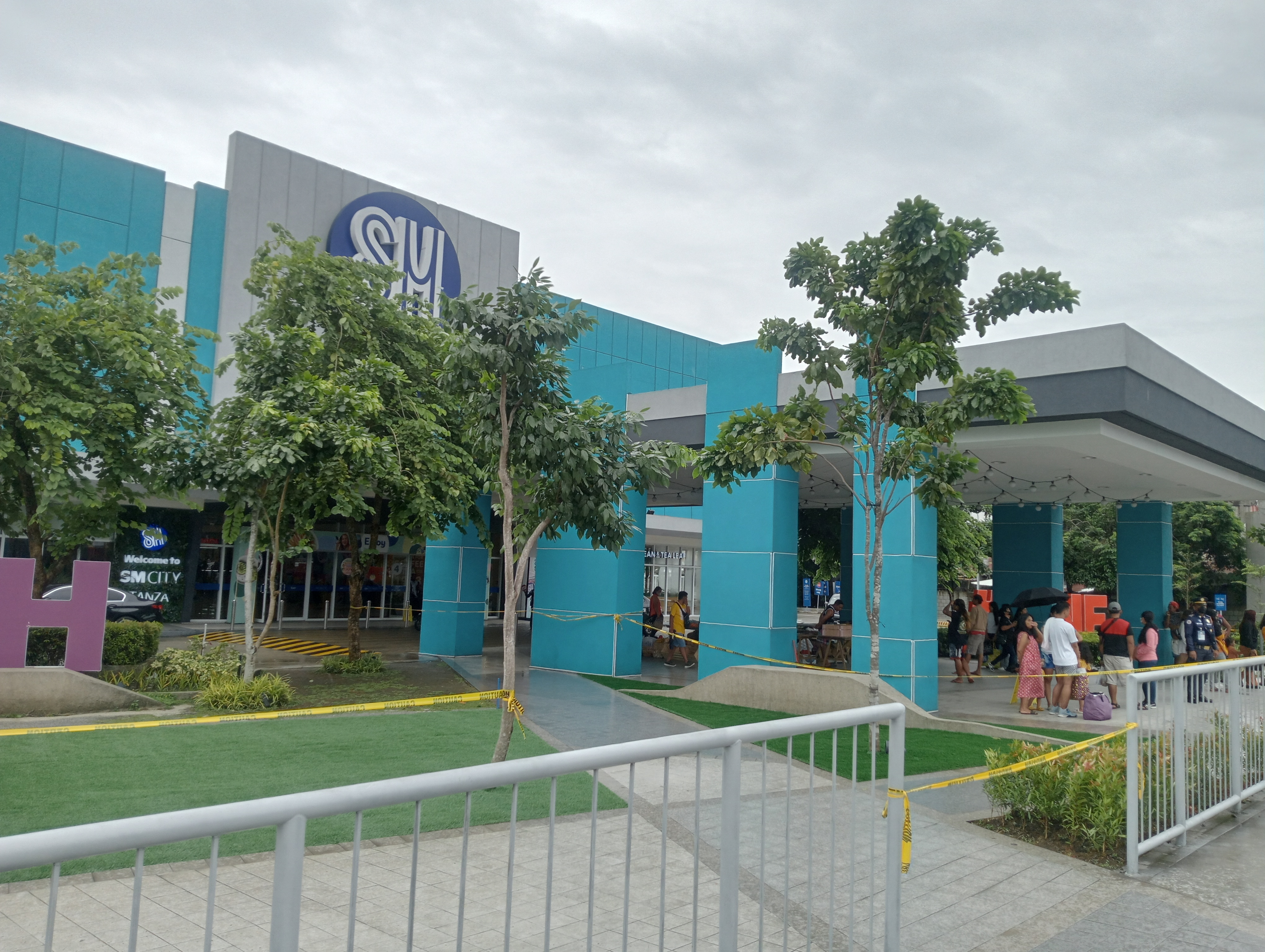
SM City Tanza

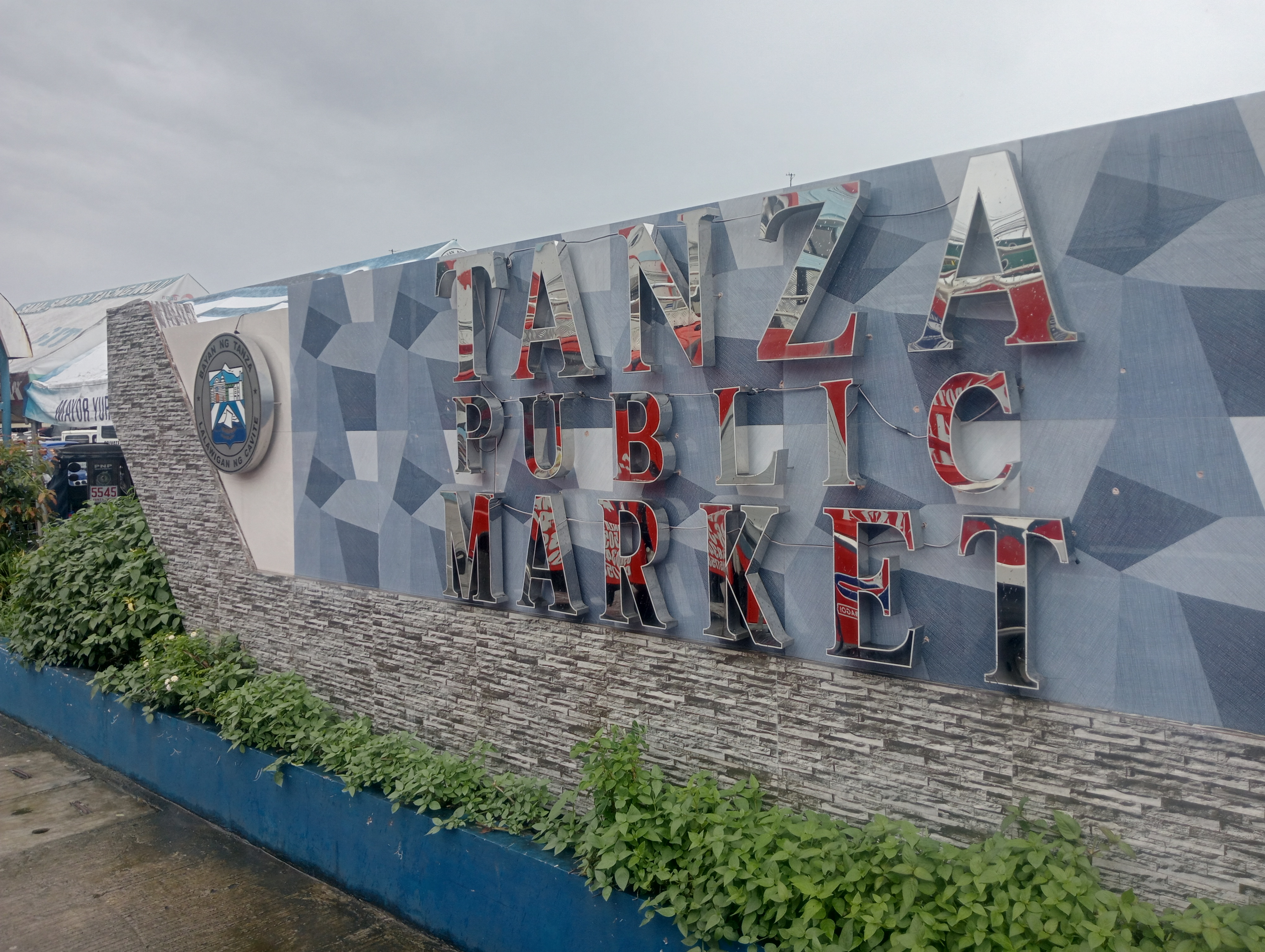
Tanza Public Market

Large retail operators have shown significant interest to the growth and increase of land value in cities throughout the Philippines. They are seen as highly developed urban centers where a lot of economic activities take place and is important to urbanization and development. Tanza is eyed as a center of exponential growth for commerce, industry and service, strengthening its stature as one of the fastest growing municipalities in Cavite province.

SM Supermalls, a subsidiary of SM Prime, the largest mall operator in the country, since 2014 is negotiating with other landowners nearby Antero Soriano Highway in Barangay Daang Amaya 2 on their plan to build a new SM Mall in the town. SM City Tanza was opened in October 2022 as their 80th mall in the country.

=== Municipal income ===
- 2009: Php.212,579,603.00
- 2010: Php.218,498,618.00
- 2011: Php.256,163,447.00
- 2012: Php.259,927,915.00
- 2013: Php.307,370,004.00
- 2014: Php.369,906,390.54
- 2015: Php.386,511,600.00
- 2016: Php.445,060,000.00
- 2020: Php.681,067,582.14
- 2021: Php.732,139,371.42

== Government ==
=== Elected officials ===
The following are the elected officials of the town elected last May 12, 2025 which serves until June 30, 2028:

Municipal Government of Tanza (2022–2025):

- Representative (7th District): Crispin Diego Remulla (NUP)
- Mayor: Archangelo B. Matro (NUP)
- Vice Mayor: Raymundo A. Del Rosario (Aksyon)
- Sangguniang Bayan members:
  - Myron S. Ner
  - Concepcion Jocelyn D. Pangan
  - Joselito P. Arca
  - Antonio A. Del Rosario Jr.
  - Niño Federico B. Matro
  - Sheryl Lyn Langit-Gervacio
  - Alexis B. Dones
  - Ryan G. Mintu

=== List of former municipal heads ===
Gobernadorcillos:

- Jose Cristobal (1870)
- Ignacio Fabian (1892)

Capitan Municipal:

- Jose del Rosario (1896)
- Francisco Valencia (1896)
- Eladio Bocalan (1896)
- Jacinto Pulido (1898)
- Ciriaco Montano (1898)

Presidente Municipal:

- Jacinto Pulido (1900)
- Eladio Bocalan (1900)
- Ciriaco Montano (1901)
- Jose del Rosario (1901)
- Hugo C. Arca (1905-1909)
- Pio A. Fojas (1910-1912)
- Pedro T. Montano (1912-1916)
- Marcus F. Figueroa (1916-1919
- Anselmo Vargas (1919)
- Cecilio N. Joya (1919-1925)
- Jose S. Sosa (1925-1928)
- Marcus F. Figueroa (1928-1934)

Municipal Mayor:

- Ladislao Joya (1934-1937)
- Jose S. Soriano (1937-1940)
- Hermogenes T. Arayata Sr. (1941-1942)
- Jose S. Soriano (1942-1943)
- Ramon del Rosario (1943-1944)
- Hermogenes T. Arayata Sr. (1945-1946)
- Rafael D. Alarca (1946-1947)
- Eustaquio Arayata (1947)
- Hermogenes T. Arayata Sr. (1948-1959)
- Hermogenes T. Pacumio (1960-1968)
- Timoteo Bocalan Sr. (1969-1978)
- Hermogenes F. Arayata Jr. (1978-1986)
- Roberto Colmenar (1986-1988)
- Hermogenes F. Arayata Jr. (1988-1998)
- Raymundo A. Del Rosario (1998-2007)
- Marcus Ashley C. Arayata (2007-2016)
- Yuri A. Pacumio (2016-2025)
- Archangelo B. Matro (2025—present)

== Education ==
The Tanza Schools District Office governs all educational institutions within the municipality. It oversees the management and operations of all private and public, from primary to secondary schools.

There are 32 government-owned daycare centers in Tanza, which is being managed by the MSWD.

=== Primary and elementary schools ===
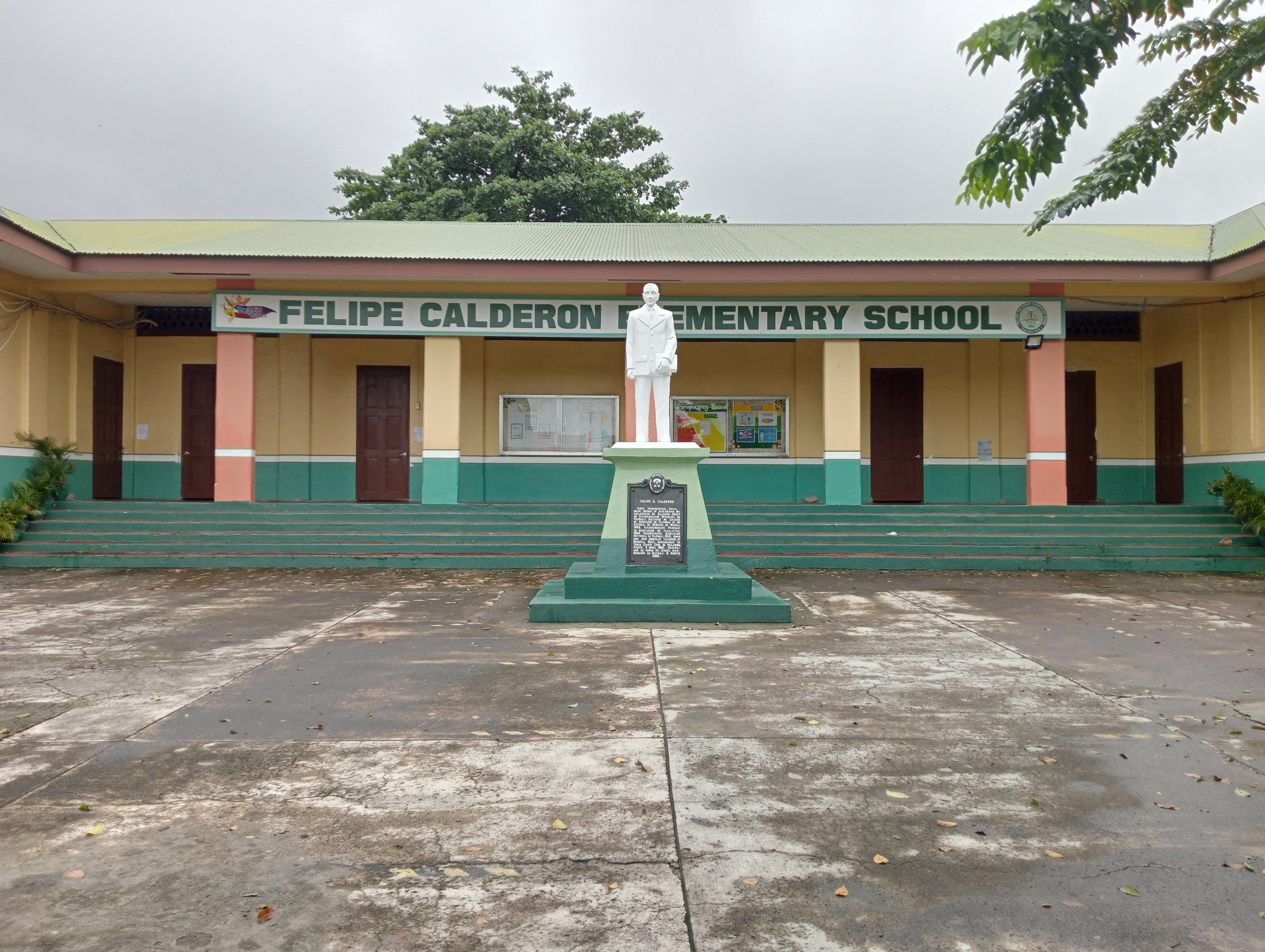
Felipe G. Calderon Elementary School

- Alonzo's Learning Center
- Amaya Elementary School
- Apostle's Creed learning school (ACLS)
- Bagtas Elementary School
- Bienvenido R. Fojas Memorial Elementary School
- Bea-Therese School
- Bunga Elementary School
- Capipisa Elementary School
- Carissa Grace Mission School
- Carissa Homes PS
- CALA Institute of the Philippines, Inc.
- Chanceteam Christian Academy Inc.
- Cuddlers Christian Academy
- Dawn Kiddie School of Cavite
- De Roman Montessori School (DRMS)
- Dei Gratia School, Inc. (DGSI)
- Del Carmen School
- Deo Roma College of Tanza
- Don Crispin Yumol Elementary School (Punta Elementary Elementary School)
- Dona Perpetua A. Yumol (Bagtas PS)
- Felipe G. Calderon Elementary School (Tanza Elementary School/Central)
- Florentino Joya Elementary School
- Francisco Lopez Mariano Academy
- G. Fabillar Learning Center
- Good Tree International School (GTIS)
- Gregorio B. Fojas Memorial School (Calibuyo Elementary School)
- Halayhay Elementary School
- Holy Nazarene Christian School
- Holy Trinity School of Tanza
- Inigo de Loyola Academy
- Julugan Elementary School
- Little Footprints to Jesus School
- Little Minds Development Center
- Lycee D' Tanza Inc.
- Maddalena Starace School
- New Life Child Development Center (NLCDC)
- Our Lady of the Holy Rosary School (OLHRS)
- Paradahan Elementary School
- Pedro M. Gimenez Academe
- Hillcrest Periwinkle Montessori School
- Sahud Ulan PS (Halayhay Annex)
- Saint Augustine School
- Saint Mary of the Woods Academy
- Saint Thomas More Academy
- Sanja Mayor Elementary School
- Santol Elementary School
- Maximino V. Pangilinan Elementary School)
- Sawyer Integrated School
- Santa Cruz (Bucal) Elementary School
- Santo Niño de Lebelle Academy
- Tanza Child Development Centre (TCDC)
- The International School for Children (TISC)
- Tres Cruses Elementary School

=== High schools ===
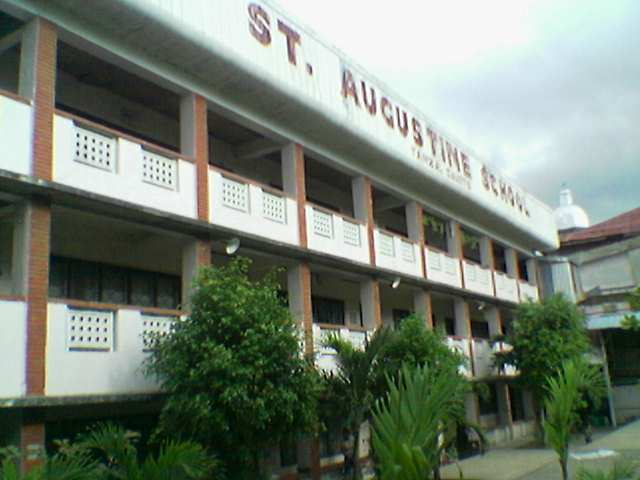
Saint Augustine School

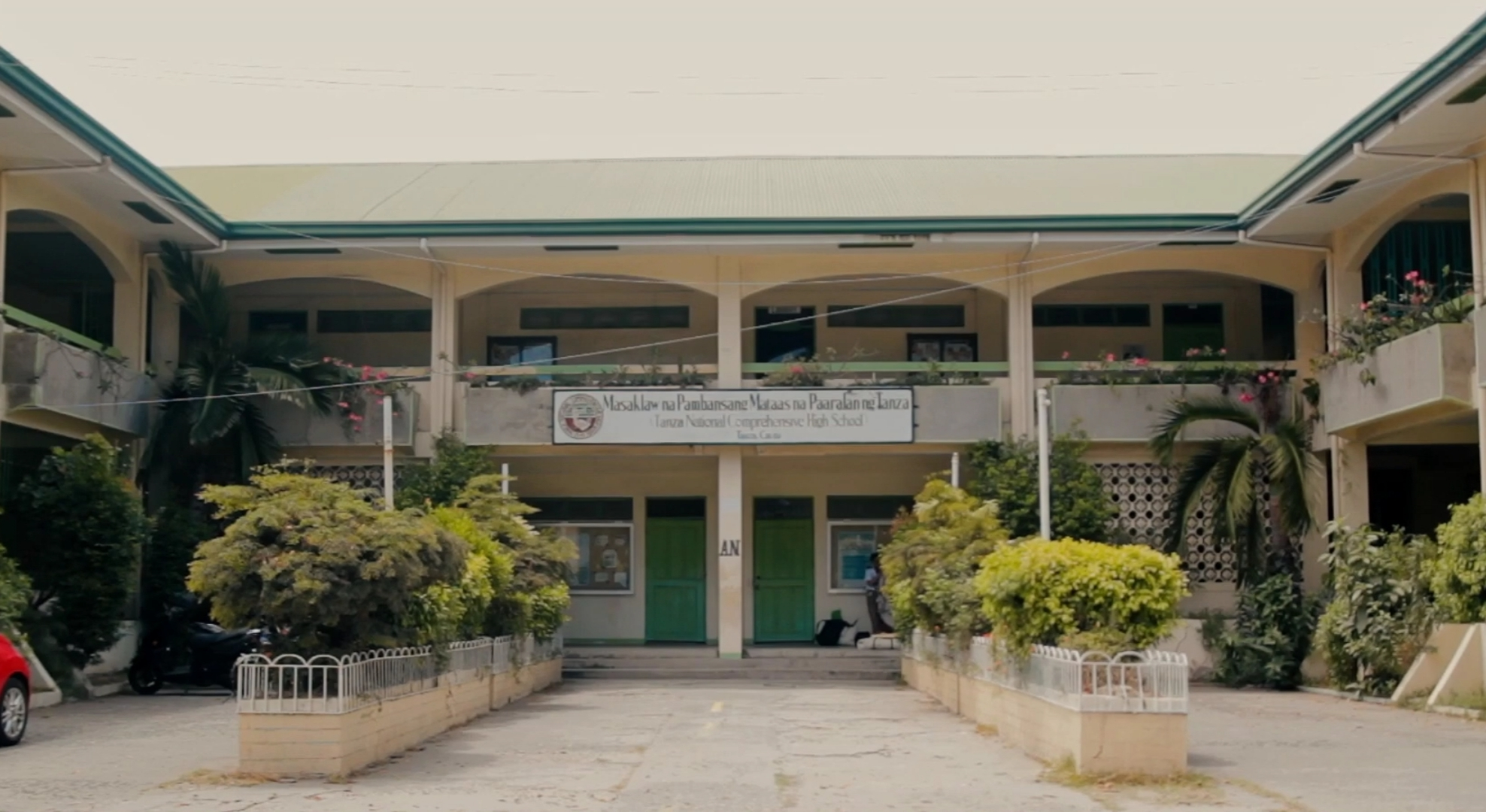
Tanza National Comprehensive High School

- Punta National High School (PNHS)
- Saint Augustine School (Junior and Senior High Campus)
- Tanza National Comprehensive High School (TNCHS)
- Tanza Senior High School (TSHS)
- Amaya School of Home and Industries (ASHI)
- Tanza National Trade School - Main (TNTS-Main)
- Tanza National Trade School - Annex (TNTS-Annex)
- Our Lady of the Holy Rosary School (OLHRS)
- Tanza Child Development Centre (TCDC)
- Hillcrest Periwinkle Montessori School (HPMS)
- Holy Nazarene Christian School (HNCS)
- De Roman Montessori School (DRMS)
- CALA Institute of the Philippines, Inc.
- Dei Gratia School, Inc. (DGSI)
- Deo Roma College of Tanza (DRCT)
- Maddalena Starace School (MSS)
- Good Tree International School (GTIS)
- Sawyer Integrated School (SIS)
- The International School for Children (TISC)
- Far East Asia Pacific Institute of Tourism Science and Technology (FEAPITSAT)

=== Higher educational institutions ===
- Cavite State University - Tanza Campus
- Far East Asia Pacific Institute of Tourism Science and Technology (FEAPITSAT-main)
- POWER School of Technology
- Saint Joseph College - Tanza
- PNTC Colleges Multi-Training Facility
- Magsaysay Training Center

== Notable personalities ==
- Jesus Crispin Remulla — Ombudsmann
- Juanito Victor Remulla — DILG Secretary; Cavite Governor
- Lyca Gairanod – The Voice Kids Philippines grand champion
- Felipe Calderón – National hero; Father of the Malolos Constitution.
- Epimaco Velasco – DILG Secretary; Cavite governor
- Justiniano S. Montano – Senator; creator of Senate Blue Ribbon Committee
- Antero Soriano – Cavite governor; senator
- Mars Ravelo – graphic novelist
- Jasmine Trias – American Idol (3rd runner-up)
- Louise delos Reyes – actress and model
- Josefino Cenizal – composer, most notably Ang Pasko ay Sumapit
- Olivia Cenizal – actress
- Ranidel de Ocampo – basketball player
- Yancy de Ocampo – basketball player
- Aleona Denise Santiago – volleyball player
- Jaja Santiago - volleyball player
- Mikey Bustos - Filipino-Canadian vlogger
- Ralph de Leon - actor

== See also ==
- List of renamed cities and municipalities in the Philippines
- List of sister cities in the Philippines
