= Saint Augustine School (Tanza) =

Roman Catholic school in Cavite, Philippines

Saint Augustine School, Inc. (Tanza, Cavite)

Location
- Tanza, Cavite; Philippines; 14°24′05″N 120°51′23″E

Information
- Type: Private, Sectarian
- Motto: Si Possunt cur non Ego (If they can, why can't I)
- Established: February 14, 1969
- Founder: Francisco V. Domingo
- Director: Director: Alain P. Manalo; Asst. Director: King Eleazar Peñaranda
- Principal: John Christian A. Silva
- Campus: Tanza, Cavite
- Colors: Gold and Maroon
- Nickname: SAS; Agustino
- Affiliations: CISAA, DICES

Saint Augustine School, Inc. (SAS) is the first private Catholic and only parochial school in Tanza, Cavite, Philippines.

== History ==
Saint Augustine School (SAS) of Tanza was named after the town's patron saint, Augustine of Hippo, also fondly called, "Tata Usteng." It was founded on February 14, 1969, by Francisco V. Domingo, the town's parish priest at that time. Envisioned as a school that will provide quality and Christian Catholic educational formation to the young, it formally opened in June 1969 and offered kinder and grade one classes. The SAS educational system was placed under De La Salle supervision, and the impressive result of its first year operation convinced skeptics of the sincerity of its objectives and vision. From 44 pupils and two teachers, and succeeding school years saw the rapid growth of the school both in student environment and hired teachers.

After only one year a primary building was built beside the left wing of the church. Then in 1971, construction of another building for the high School classrooms started. It was completed in 1972. The basketball court followed.

Its first principal was Angeles Gabutina, who served for two months, before Clemencia Ranin took over. When Ranin left, Matilde became the next principal in 1971. She stayed for two years, while Maria Leonora served as elementary principal for SY 1972–1973. Then, in 1973–1976, Patrocinio San Juan took over. The year 1975 also saw the retirement of Francisco V. Domingo, both as town parish and school director. School Year 1975-1976 ushered in new administration for SAS. Luciano Paguiligan became the new director. San Juan left, and in 1977, Corsie Legaspi took over her post. He stayed up to SY 1978–79. Then, from 1979 to 1980, Teresita Octavio acted as principal, followed by Julieta Hernandez from 1980 to 1989 and then Teodoro Bawalan as School Director and Mercedita Pacumio as principal.

On June 1, 2024, John Christian A. Silva, the former Prefect of Discipline and Head of the Office of Student Affairs, was appointed as the new school principal replacing Rowena G. Ocasion.

== The Seal ==
The current Saint Augustine School logo was created and designed by Norgin MOLINA, a former student in 1988 with Justo R. Cabuhat Jr. as adviser. This now familiar symbol of Saint Augustine School has been adopted since 1988.

The word inscribed inside the logo are in Latin. Si Possunt cur non Ego. (If they can, Why Can't I) is famous quotation of Saint Augustine of Hippo, and is the school's motto, is inspiration of the self for excellence, happiness, and fulfilment in God.

This covers three aspects: Virtus (virtues), Patria (country), Scientia (knowledge).

Elements of the seal:

- St. Augustine's Beret symbolizes March to Christianity
- Cross the beret stresses that Christ is the center of the Catholic Education
- The Heart signifies Love and Dedication to Service
- The Philippine Seal means nationalism
- The Nucleus invokes Continuous Struggle and Commitment to Improve Life.
- The figure 1969 states the year when the school was founded in Tanza, Cavite.

The Circle means Unity, and the ribbon underneath where the school's name is written signifies Support and Cooperation of Administration, Faculty, Students, Parents and the Community.

== School organ ==
Saint Augustine School is well known for its school publication 'The Crosier' & 'Ang Bakulo' being nominated and finalist in the Catholic Mass Media Awards (CMMA).

- High School Department:
  - Ang Bakulo
  - The Crosier
- Elementary Department:
  - Ang Mitra
  - The Miter
