= Felipe Calderón (Filipino politician) =

Filipino lawyer, politician (1868–1908)

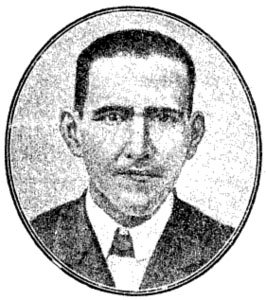

Member of the Malolos Congress from Paragua
- In office September 15, 1898 – November 13, 1899 Serving with Domingo Colmenar

Personal details
- Born: Felipe Gonzáles Calderón y Roca; 4 April 1868 Santa Cruz de Malabon, Cavite, Captaincy General of the Philippines, Spanish Empire
- Died: 6 June 1908 (aged 40) Manila, Insular Government of the Philippine Islands, United States
- Resting place: National Shrine of Our Lady of the Abandoned, Santa Ana, Manila
- Education: University of Santo Tomas
- Occupation: lawyer, social scientist, Writer, politician and revolutionary leader
- Known for: Father of the Malolos Constitution

Felipe Gonzáles Calderón y Roca, also known as Felipe G. Calderon (April 4, 1868 – June 6, 1908) was a Filipino lawyer, politician, and intellectual, known as the "Father of the Malolos Constitution".

== Early life ==
Calderón was born in Santa Cruz de Malabon (now Tanza), Cavite, to José Gonzáles Calderón and Manuela Roca. He studied at the Ateneo Municipal de Manila for his primary and secondary courses and was granted a scholarship. He received high honors in a Bachelor of Arts degree, later working in the newspaper industry writing for several newspapers. He later enrolled at the University of Santo Tomas and completed his studies at Licentiate in Law in 1894. After graduation, he participated in the law office of Cayetano Arellano.

== Involvement in the Philippine Wars for Independence ==
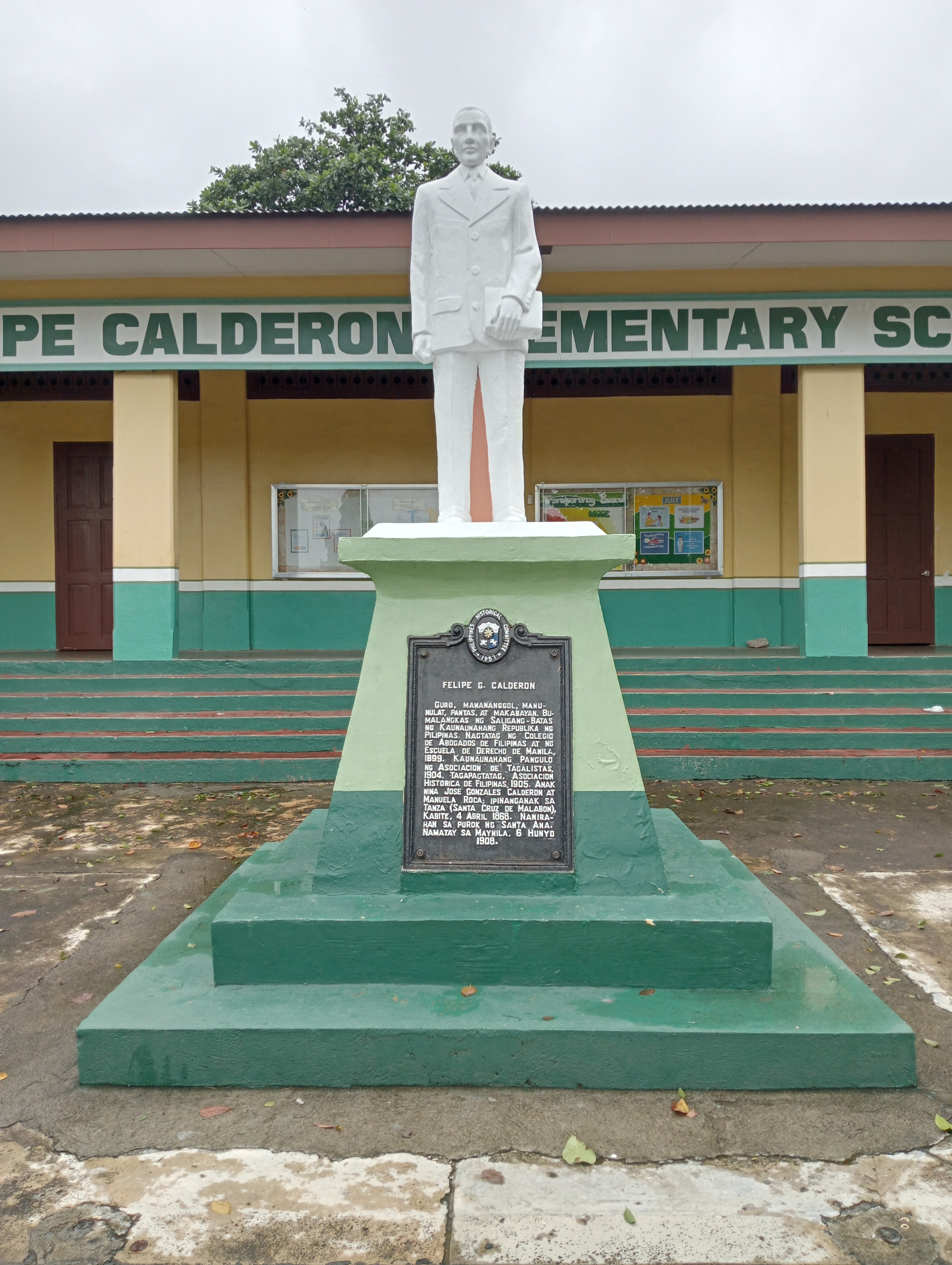
Felipe G. Calderon Monument in Tanza, Cavite

During the Philippine Revolution, Calderon ardently supported the revolutionary movement, an organization that aimed to gain independence from Spain. For his activities he was imprisoned by the Spanish colonial authorities. One school in Tondo, Manila was named after him.

In September 1898, after the return of Emilio Aguinaldo to Cavite from Hong Kong, he accepted Aguinaldo's appointment as a representative of the first district of Paragua in the Revolutionary Congress in Malolos, Bulacan. After the Spanish–American War, the República Filipina (Philippine Republic) was formed during the Malolos Constitution on January 25, 1899. The constitution was drafted by Calderon together with Pedro Paterno and Cayetano Arellano.

When the Philippine–American War began, he traveled to Manila where he appeared before the Schurman Commission on April 27, 1899, offering suggestions for the restoration of peace. He was requested to draft rules for the Philippine government of the first municipalities during the war with the United States.

In 1899, Calderon founded two law universities. These are the Colegio de Abogados de Manila (School of Lawyers of Manila) and the Escuela de Derecho (School of Duties). He taught in both institutions. In 1904, he was appointed member of a commission to draft a proposed Penal Code. He also organized the La Protección de la Infancia, (The Protection of Infants), an institution that established humanitarian institution to protect and care for disadvantaged people.

== Death ==
Calderon died on June 6, 1908, at the Saint Paul Hospital. His death was caused by intestinal obstruction while his body was weakened due to working long hours.

== In popular culture ==
- Portrayed by Johnny Barnes in the 2012 film, El Presidente.
