= Diocesan Shrine of Saint Augustine =

Roman Catholic church in Cavite, Philippines

Holy Cross Parish
- Diocesan Shrine of San Agustin and Parish of Santa Cruz
- Pandiyosesanong Dambana ni San Agustin at Parokya ng Santa Cruz (Filipino); Santuario Diocesano de San Agustin y Iglesia Parroquial de Santa Cruz (Spanish)
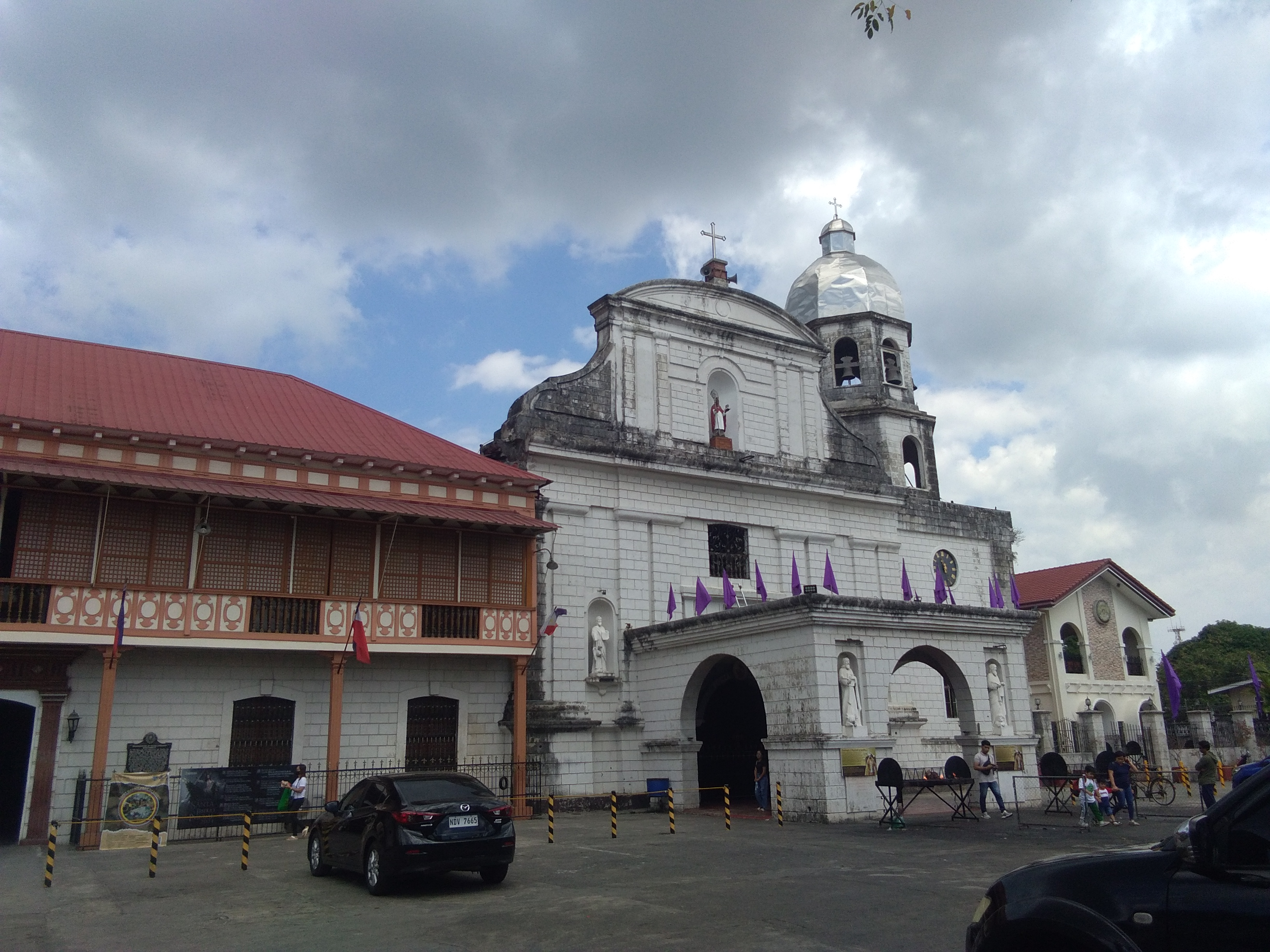
- The church in 2024

- Location in Luzon Location in the Philippines
- 14°24′04″N 120°51′25″E
- Location: Tanza, Cavite
- Country: Philippines
- Denomination: Roman Catholic
- Churchmanship: Latin Rite

History
- Former name: Holy Cross Parish
- Status: Active
- Founded: August 29, 1780
- Dedication: Holy Cross; Saint Augustine of Hippo
- Dedicated: May 3, 1980

Architecture
- Heritage designation: Marked Structure (of Historical Significance) by the National Historical Commission of the Philippines
- Architectural type: Church building
- Style: Earthquake Baroque

Specifications
- Materials: Bricks, Tuff stone, Adobe stone, steel, cement

Administration
- Archdiocese: Archdiocese of Manila
- Diocese: Diocese of Imus
- Parish: Parish of Santa Cruz

Clergy
- Rector: Fr. Virgilio Saenz Mendoza
- Vicar(s): Fr. Henry Go, SVD

The Diocesan Shrine of San Agustin and Parish of Santa Cruz, commonly known as Holy Cross Parish or the Parish of Santa Cruz, is a Roman Catholic church in the municipality of Tanza, in the province of Cavite, Philippines. The shrine is under the jurisdiction of the Diocese of Imus. The patron saint of the town is Augustine of Hippo commonly known as "Tata Usteng". The Holy Cross serves as the titular patron. The town patronal feast is celebrated annually every August 28.

== Historical marker ==
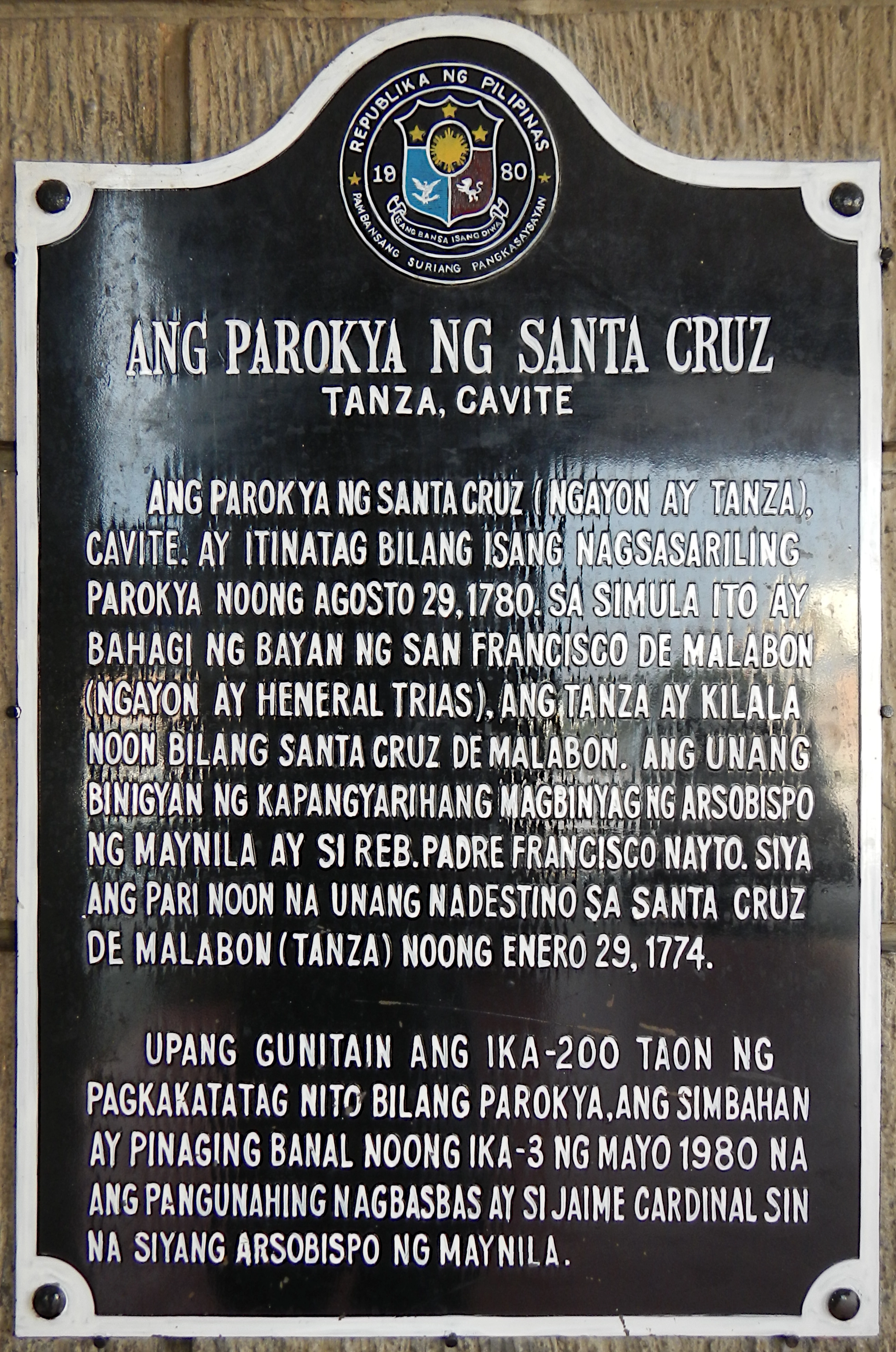
Historical marker installed in 1980

The parish was declared a structure of historical significance with the placing of a historical marker by then National Historical Institute of the Philippines on May 3, 1980. As a historical church, the provincial government of Cavite considers the parish as part of the "faith tourism" during the Holy Week.

=== Vicariate of the Saint Augustine (Tanza and Rosario) ===
Vicar Forane: Rev. Fr. Ronel Ilano

- Our Lady of the Holy Rosary Parish, Amaya, Tanza
  - Parish priest: Rev Fr. Bobby Capino
  - Parochial Vicar: Rev. Fr. Arthur Sto. Domingo
- St. John Paul II Parish, Paradahan, Tanza
  - Parish priest: Rev. Fr. Ronel Ilano
- San Isidro Labrador Parish, Ligtong, Rosario
  - Parish priest: Rev. Fr. Achilles Secio
- The Holy Cross Parish and Diocesan Shrine of Saint Augustine, Tanza (Town Proper)
  - Parish priest: Virgilio Mendoza
  - Guest Priest: Rev. Fr. Henry Go, SVD
- The Most Holy Rosary Parish, Rosario (Town Proper)
  - Parish priest: Rev. Fr. Teodoro Bawalan
  - Guest Priest: Rev. Fr. Erik Luke Estrada, ESHT
- The Resurrection Parish, Julugan, Tanza
  - Parish priest: Rev. Fr. Marco Cyril Convento
- St. Ambrose Pastoral Center, Punta, Tanza
- Priest Administrator: Rev. Fr. Sundeep Pulidindi, PIME
- Assistant Priest Administrator: Rev. Fr. Balaswamy Thota, PIME

== Gallery ==
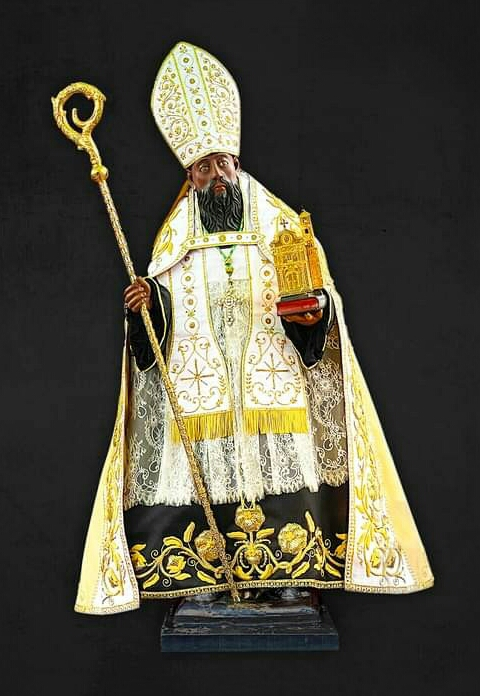
Augustine of Hippo, patron saint of Tanza, Cavite

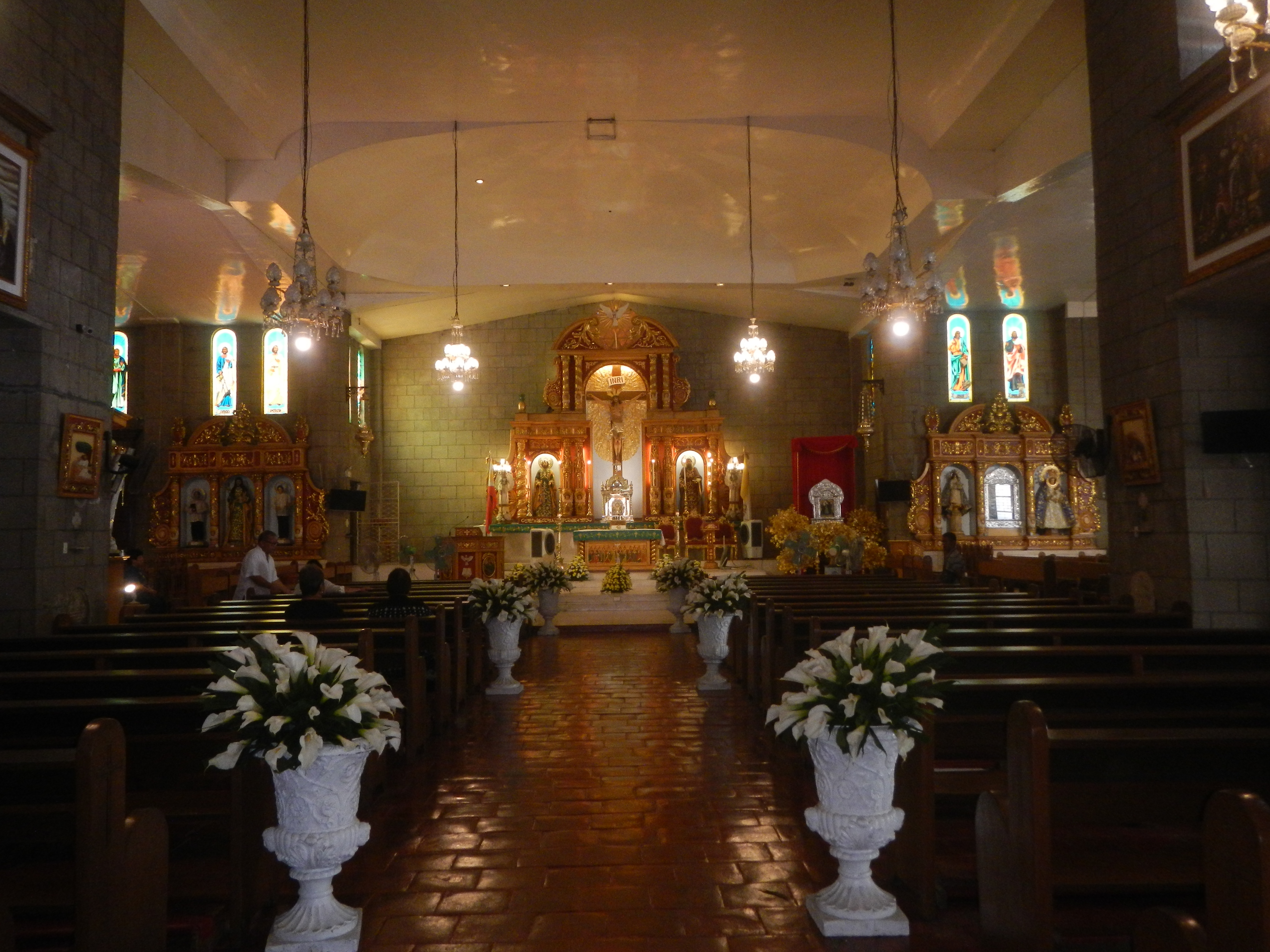
Church interior in 2018

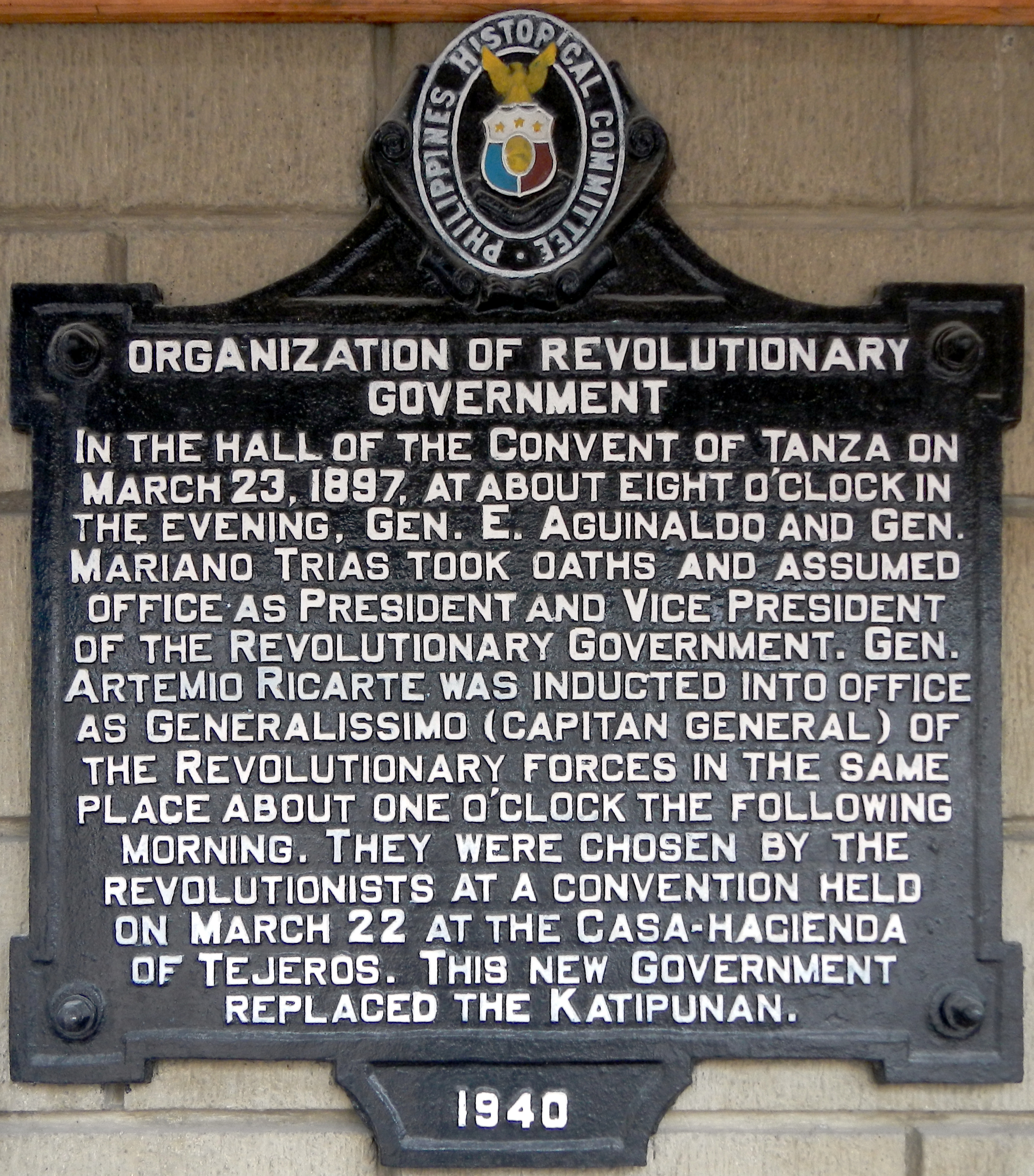
PHC historical marker at Tanza Church convent
