= Amaya School of Home Industries =

Public high school in Cavite, Philippines

- Paaralan ng mga Industriyang Pantahanan ng Amaya (Filipino)
- Seal

Location
- Sahud-Ulan; Tanza, Cavite 4108; Philippines
- Coordinates: 14°22′10.128″N 120°49′31.043″E

Information
- Other name: Mayor Timoteo Bocalan Memorial High School
- Type: Technical-vocational; State school
- Established: 18 June 1964
- Principal: Norielyn C. Narciso (School Principal IV)
- Campus type: Rural
- Colours: Blue & White
- Newspaper: The Watershed

Amaya School of Home Industries (ASHI; Filipino: Paaralan ng mga Industriyang Pantahanan ng Amaya) is a public high school located at Sahud-Ulan, Tanza, Cavite, Philippines. The school was established by virtue of Republic Act No. 3987 which was approved on June 18, 1964.

== History ==
Amaya School of Home Industries was created under Republic Act No. 3987 sponsored by Cong. Justiniano Montano, a native of Barangay Amaya, Tanza, Cavite. This bill was approved by Congress on June 18, 1964, and it was finally opened in June 1971 with the amount of P70,000 for its initial operation. It was disseminated by a Division Memo No. 21, dated May 11, 1971. Awaiting the completion of documents and construction of buildings, the students were temporarily housed at Amaya Elementary School under the principalship of Mrs. Corazon Arayata. The school's former name was Amaya Community High School were two batches graduated. The last two levels, 1st and 2nd year were transferred to the new site after the completion of the 2-storey room. On April 3, 1972, in preparation for the opening of classes SY 1972–1973, the Amaya School of Home Industries was born. It offered two programs: the Vocational secondary school program and Out-of-School Youth and Adult Education program. The Vocational Secondary Program started with an initial enrolment of 133 students who were handled by seven teachers while the Out-of-School Youth had ninety (90) OSY and seven adults enrolled in Home Industries in taking up dressmaking, tailoring, shell craft and woodcraft handled by local technicians, sewers and instructors hired for three six months. The administrative and supervisory personnel were composed of the Home Industries training supervisor, accounting clerk, storekeeper, and janitor

== Curriculum ==
Amaya School of Home Industries is a public technical-vocational high school which implements education programs in accordance with its curriculum Strengthened Technical - Vocational Education Program – Competency Based Curriculum (STVEP – CBC).

== Gallery ==
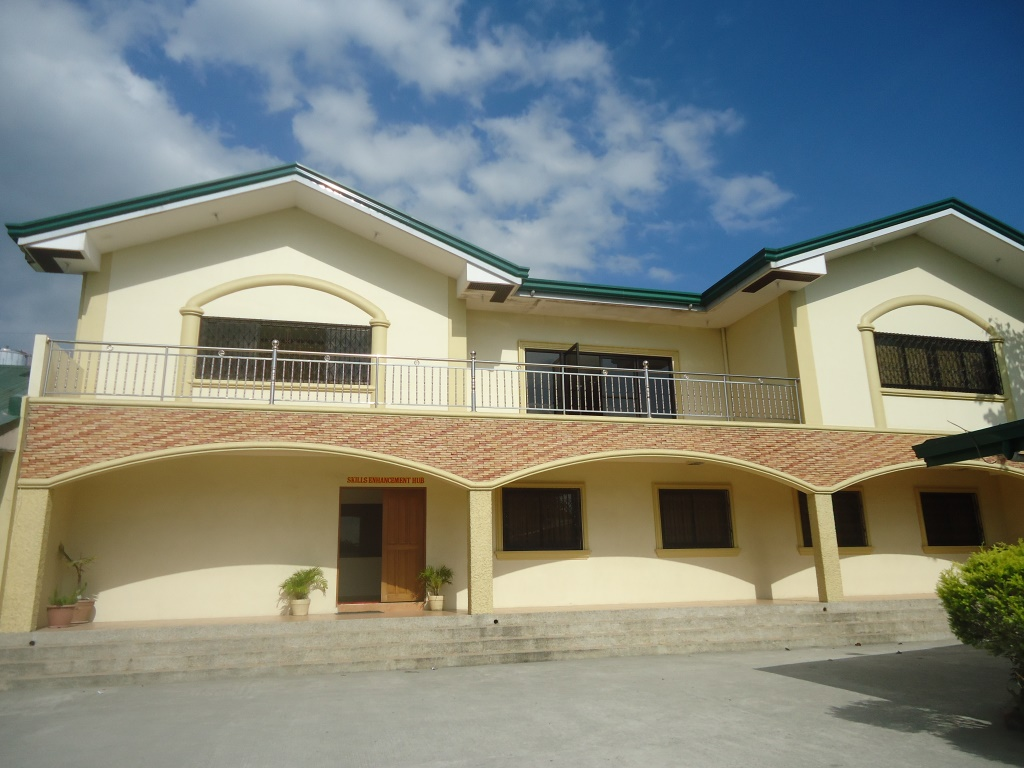
New Administration Building

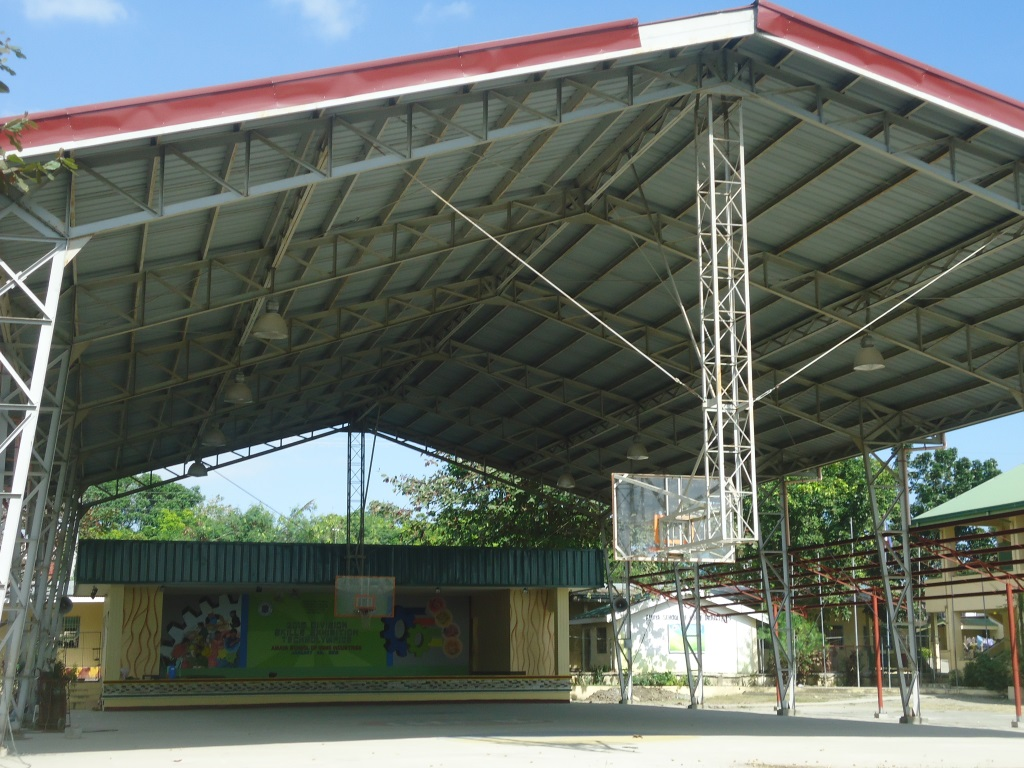
Covered Court

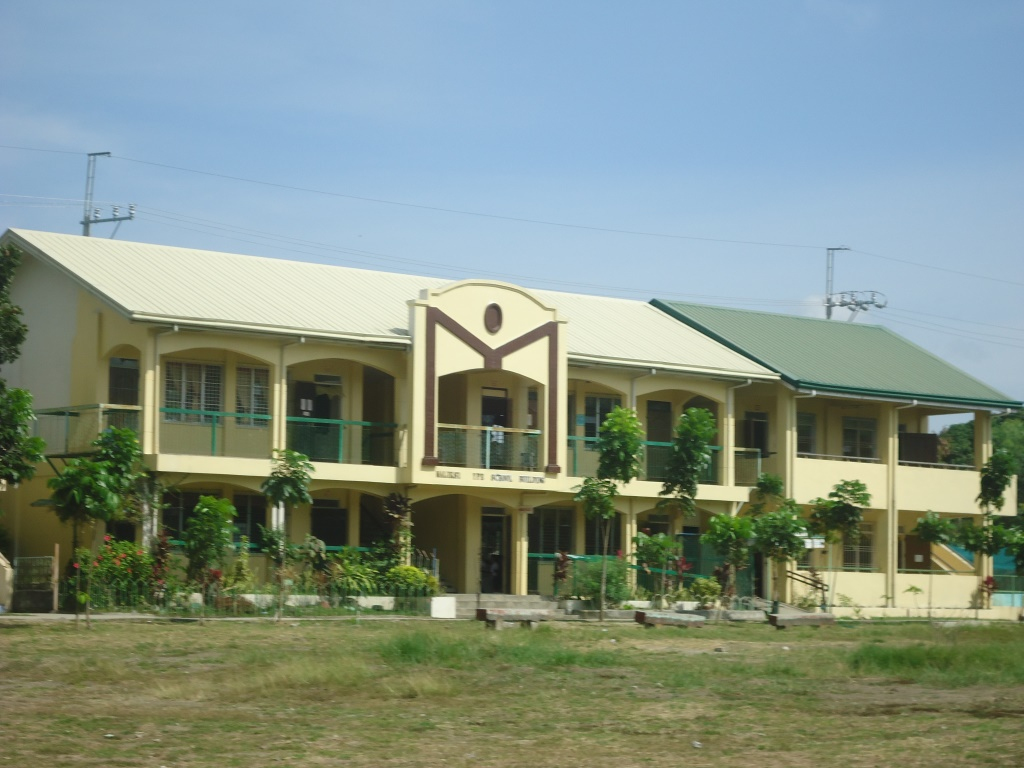
Maliksi-Type School Building

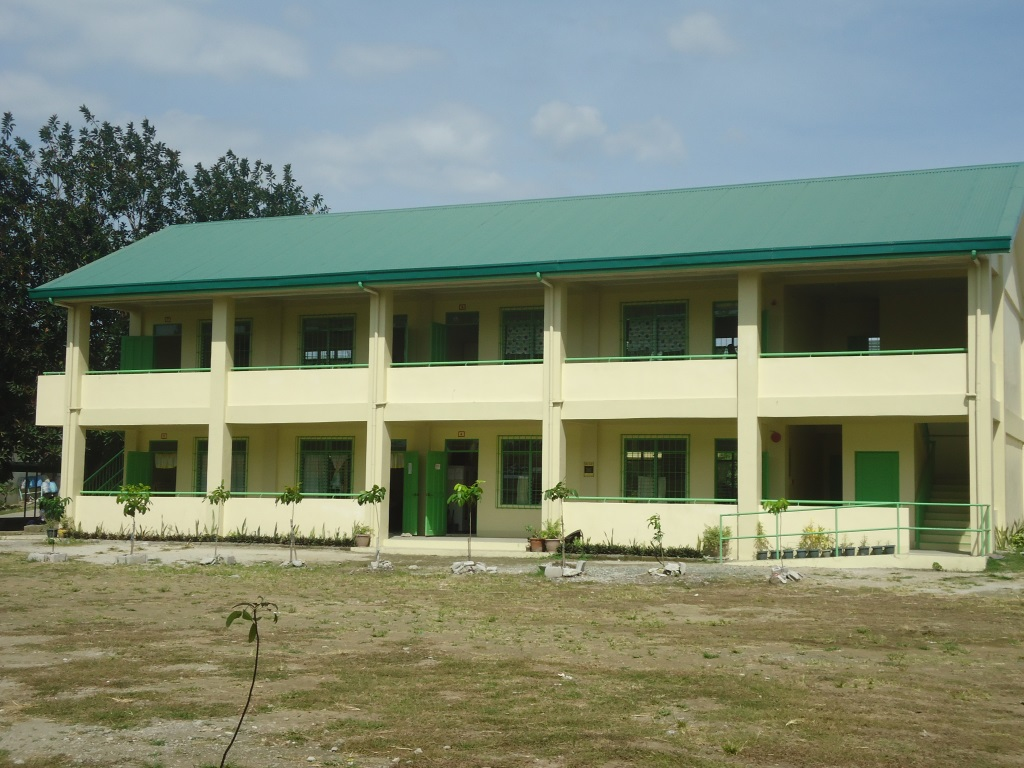
Aus-Aid Building

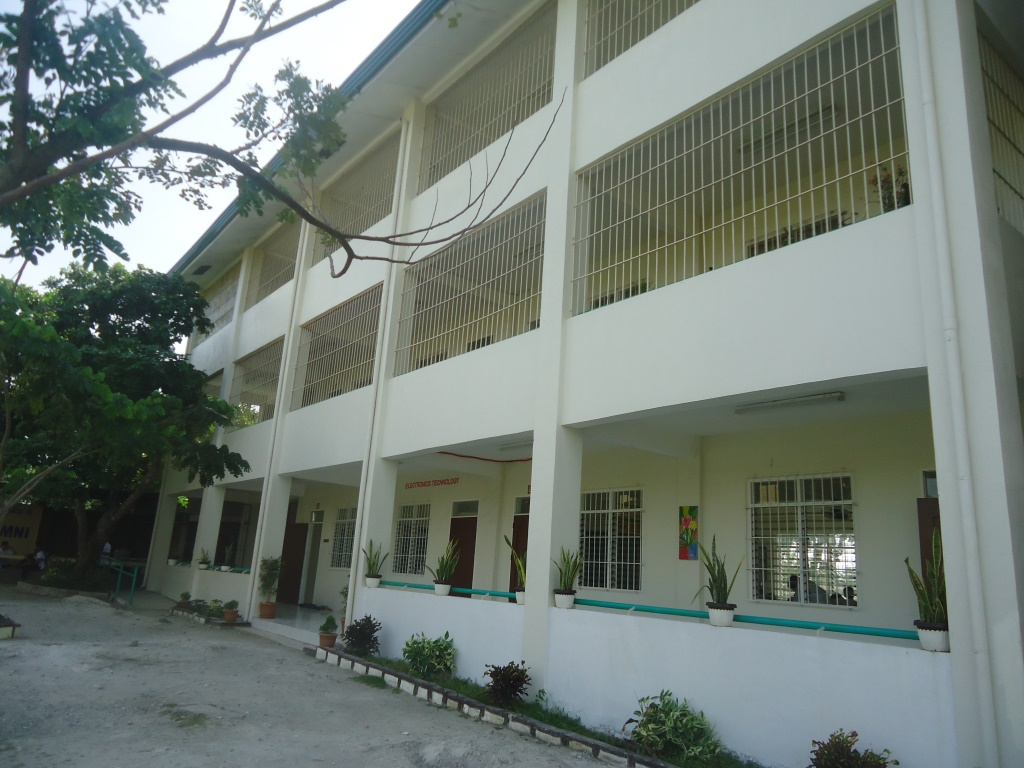

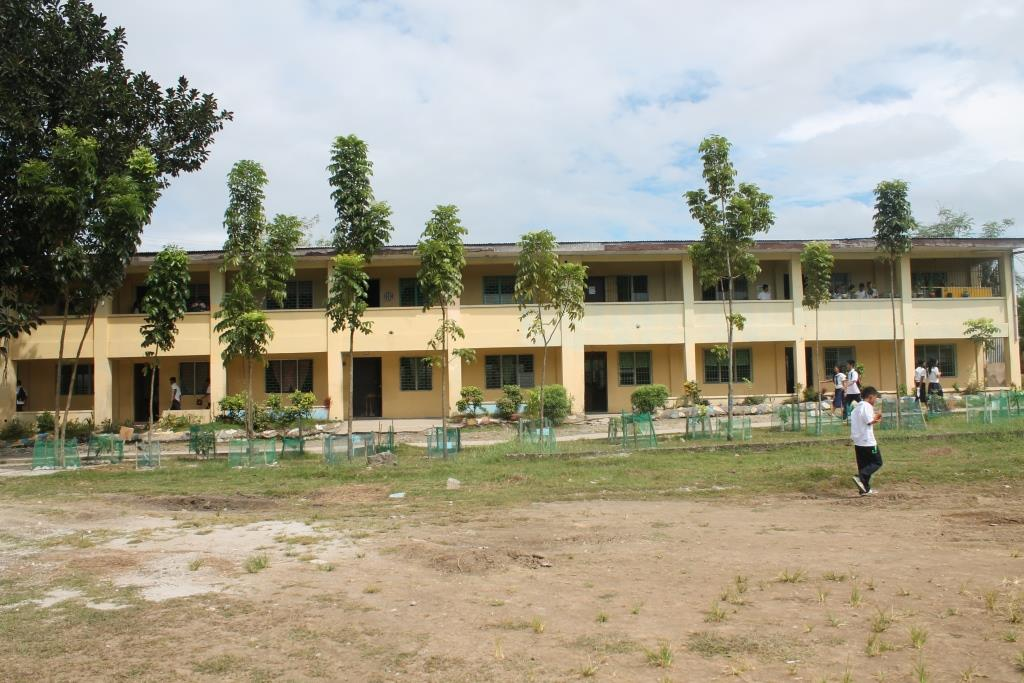
Masungsong Building

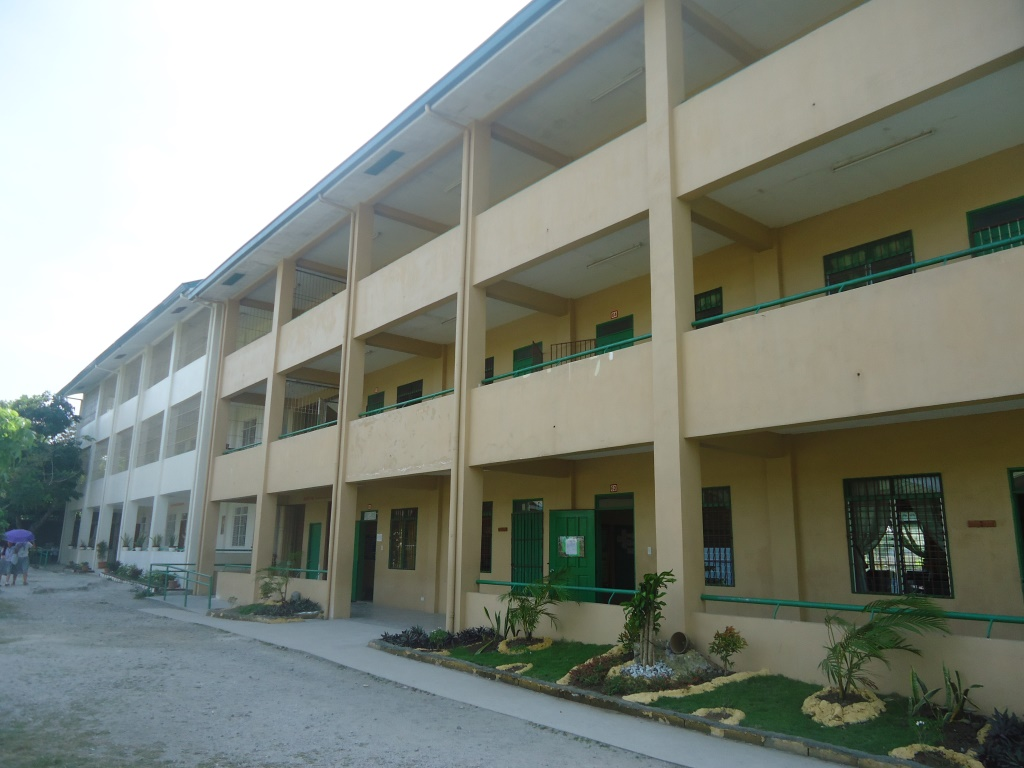
