= Ashi, Iran =

Ashi اشي
- Village
- Location within Iran
- Coordinates: 28°43′24″N 51°31′09″E
- Country: Iran
- Province: Bushehr
- County: Tangestan
- Bakhsh: Central
- Rural District: Ahram

Population (2006)
  - Total: 30
- Time zone: UTC+3:30 (IRST)
  - Summer (DST): UTC+4:30 (IRDT)

Ashi (Persian: اشي, also Romanized as Āshī; also known as Āshīr) is a village in Ahram Rural District, in the Central District of Tangestan County, Bushehr Province, Iran. At the 2006 census, its population was 30, in 10 families.
