= American Safety and Health Institute =

Health and safety association based in Eugene, Oregon, USA

The American Safety and Health Institute is an association of health and safety educators based in Eugene, OR that provides certification in CPR, First Aid, and other basic topics for laypersons and professionals. Certification by the ASHI is generally accepted as valid and equivalent to similar certification given by the American Red Cross or American Heart Association in CPR and First Aid. Certification training programs include CPR and AED, Emergency Medical Responder, Basic Life Support, and Advanced Cardiac Life Support.

The organization was acquired and is now part of Health & Safety Institute (HSI) family of brands for workplace safety, training and emergency care solutions is headquartered in Eugene, Oregon, and consists of more than 20,000 professional safety and health education members. Founded in 1996 by Tim Eiman and Gregg Rich in Holiday, Florida as a partnership of safety and health instructors, ASHI has developed to include more than 8,000 Training Centers across the United States and in several foreign countries.

In an effort to unify its individual health and safety brands (ASHI, MEDIC First Aid, and EMS Safety), HSI Is phasing out all 3 brands including ASHI and its programs.

Starting 2021, the ASHI brand name and its training programs, which include a range of courses covering first aid and CPR training as well as basic and advanced life support training for healthcare providers, will be slowly phased out and become part of the HSI brand.

Therefore, the new HSI programs will incorporate the latest AHA, ARC and ILCOR CoSTR guidelines into new the HSI training programs and materials.
