= Malolos Constitution =

1899 constitution of the First Philippine Republic

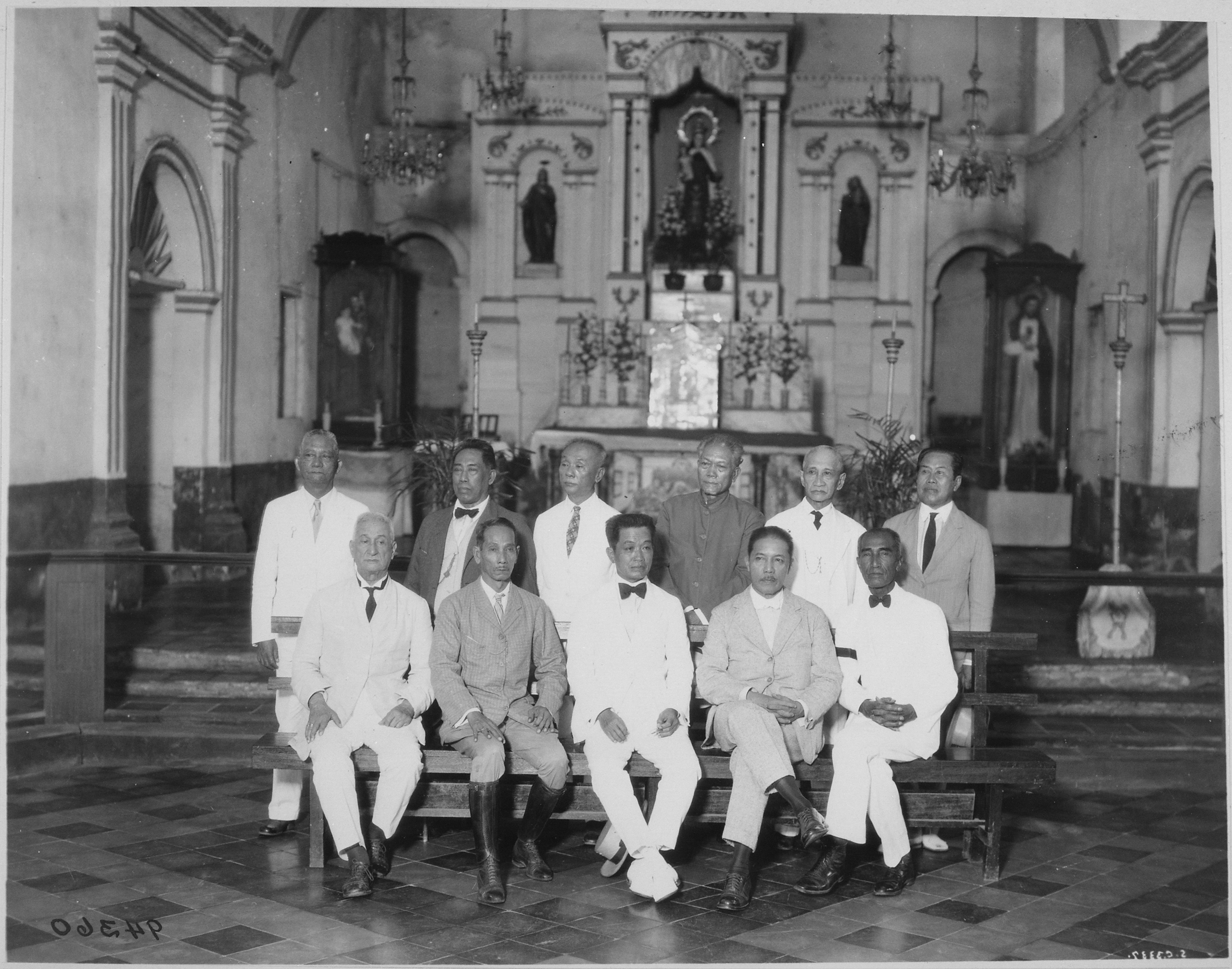
- General Aguinaldo (seated, center) and ten of the delegates to the first assembly that passed the constitution, in Barasoain Church, Malolos (Taken December 8, 1929)

Overview
- Jurisdiction: First Philippine Republic
- Ratified: January 21, 1899
- System: Parliamentary republic
- Chambers: Malolos Congress (National Assembly)
- Location: Malolos, Bulacan
- Authors: Felipe Calderón y Roca and Felipe Buencamino
- Signatories: Malolos Congress

Full text
- Constitution of the Philippines (1899) at Wikisource

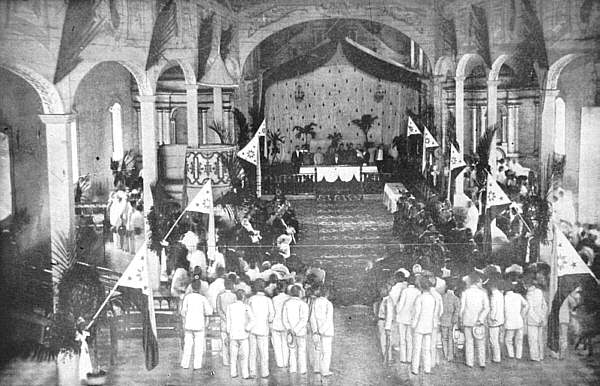
Malolos Congress in 1898

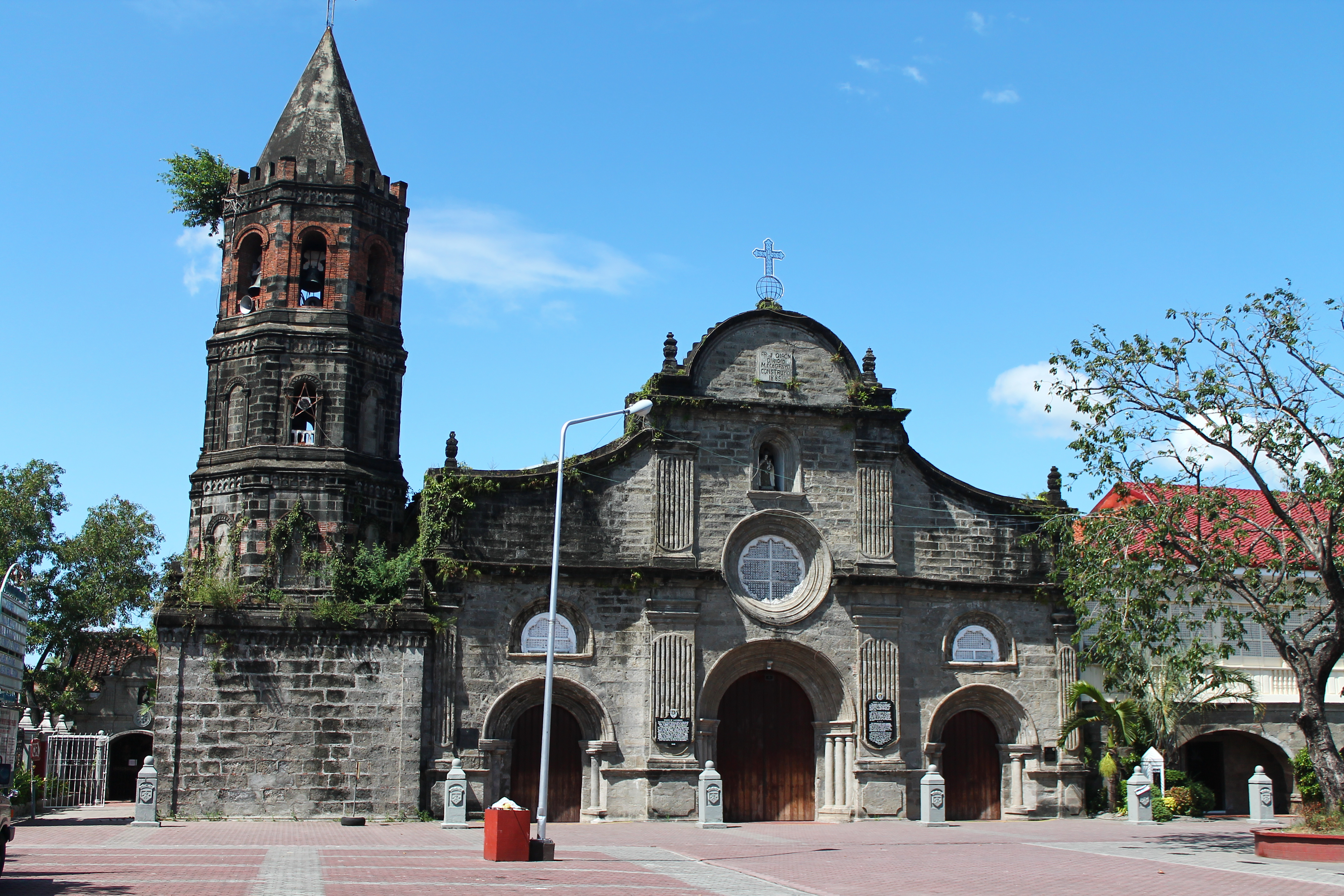
The church where the constitution was ratified

The Political Constitution of 1899 (Spanish: Constitución Política de 1899), informally known as the Malolos Constitution, was the constitution of the First Philippine Republic. It was written by Felipe Calderón y Roca and Felipe Buencamino as an alternative to a pair of proposals to the Malolos Congress by Apolinario Mabini and Pedro Paterno. After a lengthy debate in the latter part of 1898, it was promulgated on January 21, 1899.

The constitution placed limitations on unsupervised freedom of action by the chief executive which would have hampered rapid decision making. As it was created during the fight for Philippine independence from Spain, however, its Article 99 allowed unhampered executive freedom of action during wartime. Unsupervised executive governance continued throughout the Philippine–American War which erupted soon after proclamation.

== History ==
=== Background ===
After over 300 years of Spanish rule, the country developed from a small overseas colony governed from the Viceroyalty of New Spain to a land with modern elements in the cities. The Spanish-speaking middle classes of the 19th century were increasingly exposed to modern European ideas, including Liberalism, some studying in Spain and elsewhere in Europe.

During the 1890s, the Katipunan, or KKK, a secret society dedicated to achieving Philippine independence from Spain, was formed and led by Andres Bonifacio. When the KKK was discovered by Spanish authorities, Bonifacio issued the Cry of Balintawak which began the Philippine Revolution in 1896. The revolutionary forces took steps to form a functioning government called the Republic of Biak-na-Bato. In 1897, the Tejeros Convention was convened and the Constitution of Biak-na-Bato drafted and ratified. It was drafted by Isabelo Artacho and Félix Ferrer and based on the first Constitution of Cuba. However, it was never fully implemented. After several battles between the Spanish and Philippine Revolutionary Army, a truce called the Pact of Biak-na-Bato was signed in 1897. Emilio Aguinaldo (who had replaced Bonifacio as leader) and other revolutionary leaders accepted a payment from Spain and went into exile in Hong Kong.

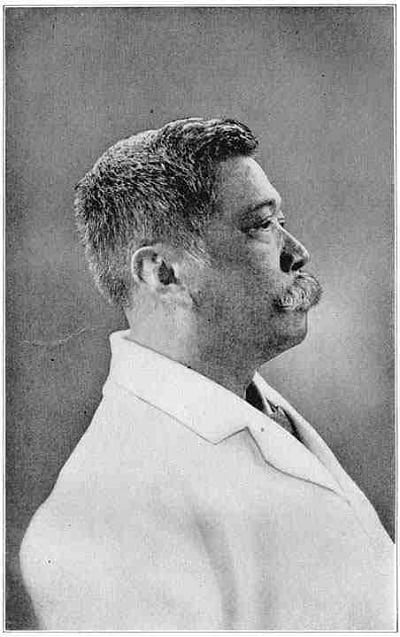
Felipe Buencamino, a lawyer and revolutionary leader, was one of the writers of the Malolos Constitution

When the Spanish–American War broke out on April 25, 1898, the United States Commodore George Dewey aboard the USS Olympia sailed from Hong Kong to Manila Bay leading the Asiatic Squadron of the U.S. Navy. On May 1, 1898, the American force defeated the Spanish in the Battle of Manila Bay. Later that month, the U.S. Navy transported Aguinaldo back to the Philippines.

Aguinaldo took control of the newly re-formed Philippine revolutionary forces and quickly surrounded Manila on land while the American blockaded the city from the bay. On June 12, Aguinaldo issued the Philippine Declaration of Independence and followed that with several decrees forming the First Philippine Republic. Elections were held from June 23 to September 10, 1898 for a new national legislature, the Malolos Congress.

=== Drafting a basic law ===
After the Malolos Congress was convened on September 15, 1898, a committee was selected to draft a constitution for the republic. The committee was composed of Hipólito Magsalin, Basilio Teodoro, José Albert, Joaquín González, Gregorio Araneta, Pablo Ocampo, Aguedo Velarde, Higinio Benitez, Tomás del Rosario, José Alejandrino, Alberto Barretto, José Ma. de la Viña, José Luna, Antonio Luna, Mariano Abella, Juan Manday, Felipe Calderón, Arsenio Cruz and Felipe Buencamino. They were all wealthy and well educated.

== Ratification ==
| Choice | Votes | % |
|---|---|---|
| For | 98 | 100 |
| Against | 0 | 0 |
| Invalid/blank votes | | – |
| Total | 98 | 100 |
Source:The Law of the First Philippine Republic (The Laws of Malolos) 1898-1899

== The document ==
The Political Constitution of 1899 was originally written in the Spanish language, which was officially used in the Philippines at that period in history. This constitution is made up of a total of one hundred one (101) articles, which are grouped into fourteen separate titles. Additionally, there are transitory provisions included in eight extra articles that address temporary or transitional situations. Furthermore, the document also contains one more article that is un-numbered and serves as an additional provision outside the regular count.

=== Influences ===
The overall structure and writing style of this constitutional document were heavily modeled after the Spanish Constitution of 1812. This influential document served as a major reference point not only for the Philippines but also for several Latin American countries whose own constitutions were inspired by it during that same historical era. Felipe Calderón, who helped write the Philippine constitution, stated in his personal journal that they also examined the charters of other nations such as Belgium, Mexico, Brazil, Nicaragua, Costa Rica, and Guatemala. These countries were chosen for study because they had similar social structures, political challenges, cultural compositions, and types of government systems as those found in the Philippine Islands. The French Constitution of 1793 was also reviewed and used as a reference point during the drafting process.

=== Constitutional ideas ===
==== Retroversion of sovereignty to the people ====
The central idea behind the constitution was the concept known as the retroversion of sovereignty to the people. This legal principle directly challenged the legitimacy and authority of colonial rule under the Spanish Empire. It served as a foundation for many independence movements across Latin America and also for the Philippine Revolution. The idea became a historical predecessor to the modern idea of popular sovereignty, which is now recognized in most constitutions around the world. Popular sovereignty is the belief that ultimate political power belongs to the people, and that government officials only carry out duties that the people permit.

This belief in the priority of people's sovereignty over the authority of the nation itself was drawn from the famous French political document, the Declaration of the Rights of Man and Citizen of 1793 (originally Déclaration des droits de l'Homme et du citoyen de 1793 in French). This idea is reflected in article 4 of the Malolos Constitution. It also mirrors the ideals found in the American Declaration of Independence and the United States Constitution, both of which emphasize the power of the people as the source of all government authority.

==== Civil liberties in the Spanish tradition ====
Title IV of the constitution contains twenty-seven articles that clearly define the natural rights and political freedoms of Filipino citizens. These include not only civil liberties like freedom of speech and religion, but also protections from abuse and unfair legal treatment. It covers both negative liberties (freedom from interference) and specific rights such as protection against self-incrimination and fair treatment in legal procedures. The decision to include these rights was influenced by many real-life abuses committed by authorities, especially police forces, as documented in the Philippine Declaration of Independence on June 12, 1898.

Although these ideas were not unique to the Philippines, the Malolos Constitution's inclusion of these rights was notable. Many of the rights listed were shortened versions of the civil and political liberties found in the Spanish Constitution of 1869. That Spanish document introduced liberal principles to the public and inspired a generation of Filipino heroes, such as Governor-General Carlos María de la Torre and priest José Burgos. Others influenced by these ideas include Galicano Apacible y Castillo, Graciano López y Jaena, Marcelo Hilario del Pilar y Gatmaitán, and national hero José Rizal. Calderón noted that the constitution aimed to protect freedoms similar to those guaranteed by England's Assize of Clarendon and Magna Carta, such as ending arbitrary arrests and ensuring due legal process.

As stated in Title III, Article 5 of the Malolos Constitution: “The State recognizes the freedom and equality of all beliefs, as well as the separation of Church and State.”

Form of Government

According to Title II, Article 4, the government established by the constitution is to be popular (based on the people's will), representative (elected by the people), alternative (allowing changes in leadership), and responsible (accountable to the people). The government is required to function through three separate and independent branches: the legislative, executive, and judicial. These three powers must always remain distinct and separate. They are not allowed to be combined or controlled by a single person or group, and the legislative power cannot be given to just one individual.

The government outlined is a Responsible Government, a key feature in parliamentary systems, where the executive must answer directly to the legislature. This idea is emphasized again in Title V, Article 50, and Title VII, Article 56.

Title V, Article 50 gives the National Assembly of Representatives (the one-house legislature of the Republic) the authority to censure officials and allows its members to use a right called interpellation. This right allows members of the assembly to question government officials directly, similar to a question period. Meanwhile, Title VII, Article 56 explains that the president holds executive power, which he exercises with the help of his Secretaries, organized into a Council of Government led by the president of that council. Furthermore, Title IX, Article 75 holds the secretaries collectively responsible for the general direction of the government's policies, and individually accountable for their own decisions and actions, just as is common in parliamentary systems.

The names used for government officials and institutions in the constitution follow parliamentary traditions but use different terms compared to Anglo-Saxon countries. For example, instead of using terms like Parliament, Cabinet, Prime Minister, Minister, and Member of Parliament (MP), the constitution uses the terms Assembly, Council of Government, President of the Council of Government, secretary, and Representative.

Permanent Commission

The constitution created the Permanent Commission to continue legislative work while the National Assembly is not in session. This commission is made up of seven members elected from the National Assembly. During its first meeting, the Commission must elect one member to serve as president and another to serve as secretary. The Permanent Commission has several important duties, including:

1. Deciding whether there is enough evidence to begin legal proceedings against top government officials like the president, members of the Assembly, government secretaries, the chief justice, or the solicitor general;
2. Calling the National Assembly into a special session if the Court of Justice needs to be formed;
3. Reviewing unresolved matters so that they may be addressed again;
4. Calling the Assembly for special sessions when the situation is urgent;
5. Acting on behalf of the Assembly in performing its powers as outlined in the Constitution, except for the power to create or pass laws.

The commission meets whenever it is called to do so by its presiding officer, following the rules stated in the constitution.

=== Final changes and promulgation ===
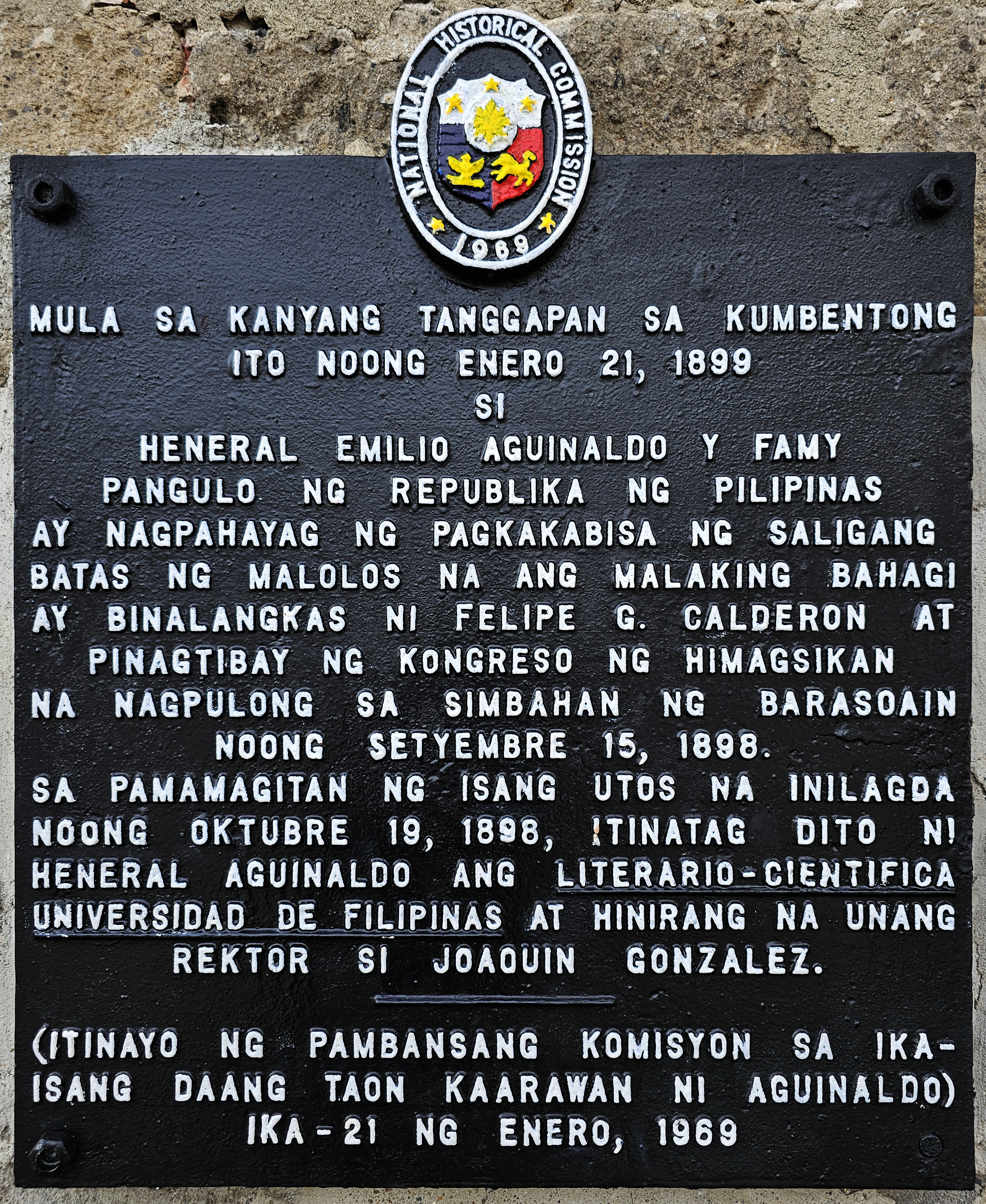
Historical marker installed in 1969 at Barasoain Church to commemorate the promulgation of the Malolos Constitution by Aguinaldo

Final Changes and Promulgation

A historical marker was installed in 1969 at Barasoain Church to remember and honor the official announcement of the Malolos Constitution by Emilio Aguinaldo.

The Malolos Congress spent over a month—between October 25 and November 29, 1898—discussing and debating each part of the draft constitution created by Felipe Calderón. By the end of this period, the members of Congress had mostly come to an agreement on the draft, except for one main issue: religion. On November 28, by just one vote, Congress approved an amendment that added a section guaranteeing religious freedom.

Apolinario Mabini, one of Aguinaldo's main advisors, disagreed with the final draft. He believed the proposed system of government would not function well during wartime. Mabini's opinion carried weight due to his role in Aguinaldo's leadership. On January 21, Aguinaldo sent a letter to Congress asking for certain changes to be made to the draft. These changes added provisions that gave Aguinaldo temporary powers to issue decrees while the nation was still fighting for independence. Congress approved the updated draft on January 20, 1899, and it was officially enacted the next day, January 21.

Translations

The original text of the Malolos Constitution was written in Spanish, which was the official language of the country at that time. Over the years, several translations of the constitution have been published and circulated for wider understanding and study.

Legacy

Although the First Philippine Republic was formed under the Malolos Constitution, it was never officially recognized by foreign governments, and the constitution was never fully enforced across the entire Philippine archipelago.

After Spain's defeat in the Spanish–American War, the Treaty of Paris of 1898 transferred control of the Philippines and other territories to the United States. Shortly after, the Philippine–American War began on February 4, 1899, starting with the Battle of Manila. On March 23, 1901, Emilio Aguinaldo was captured by American forces. On April 19 of the same year, he released a formal Proclamation of Surrender to the United States, instructing his supporters to end the resistance and put down their arms. General Miguel Malvar took command of the remaining Filipino forces, but he too eventually surrendered, along with his sick wife, their children, and some of his officers, on April 13, 1902.

The United States Congress later passed a series of laws known as organic acts, beginning with the Philippine Organic Act of 1902. These acts served as temporary constitutions for the Philippines while under U.S. control and were inspired by American constitutional ideas. Later, the Tydings–McDuffie Act of 1934 led to the 1935 Constitution of the Commonwealth of the Philippines. More constitutions followed, including the current 1987 Constitution. These newer constitutions were based heavily on the U.S. system and often copied phrases directly from American documents. As a result, the Spanish-style Malolos Constitution had limited influence on later Philippine legal frameworks.

Despite this, Isagani Giron, a former president of the Historical Society of Bulacan (Samahang Pangkasaysayan ng Bulacan or SAMPAKA), described the Malolos Constitution as “the best Constitution the country ever had.”

The original copy of the Malolos Constitution is stored at the historical archives of the Batasang Pambansa Complex, which is the current home of the Philippine House of Representatives. However, the public is not allowed to view this historic document.

== See also ==
- Constitutionalism
- Constitution of the Philippines

== Bibliography ==
- Kalaw, Maximo Manguiat (1927). The Development of Philippine Politics. Oriental commercial.
- Tucker, Spencer (2009). The encyclopedia of the Spanish–American and Philippine–American wars: a political, social, and military history. ABC-CLIO. ISBN 978-1-85109-951-1.
- The Malolos Congress (PDF). National Historical Institute. 2010.
