= James Cavanagh (architect) =

- Born: James Charles Cavanagh; 1874; Melbourne, Victoria
- Died: 6 May 1957; Adelaide, South Australia
- Occupation: Architect
- Parent: John
- Relatives: Richard John (brother)(? – 1945); Michael Francis (brother) (1860 – 1941)

James Charles Cavanagh (1874 – 6 May 1957) was an Australian architect, primarily known for his work in Western Australia and Queensland.

== Early life and education ==
James Charles Cavanagh was born in Melbourne in 1874, the third son of an Irish born builder and contractor, John Cavanagh ( – 18 March 1895). In 1881 his family moved to Adelaide, South Australia, where his father took on a position as supervisor of public buildings in the Government Architect's Department. Cavanagh was educated at the Christian Brothers College, Adelaide and then at the South Australian School of Art, following which he was articled to his older brother, Michael's, architectural practice.

In 1891, Cavanagh enrolled as a student at the Royal Institute of British Architects, studying at the South Kensington Academy in London. He returned to Australia and continued working in his brother's office for a few years. Cavanagh then travelled in the Eastern States and in 1900 returned to Perth, where he became a partner with his brother until 1905 when he took two years off to study some more in London and travel on the continent.

The firm, Cavanagh and Cavanagh, were architects and sworn valuers who undertook a number of significant projects for the Roman Catholic Church including the Bishop's Palace, Church of the Oblate Fathers in Fremantle, the Redemptorist Monastery, North Perth, St John of God Subiaco Hospital and St Mary's Roman Catholic Church in Kalgoorlie, as well as range of commercial and residential properties.

In 1918, Cavanagh moved to Brisbane, where he was employed as an architectural draftsman at the Queensland Public Works Department. In 1920 he established the Brisbane office of Cavanagh and Cavanagh, designing Tara House (Irish Club) in Brisbane, St. Mary's Catholic Church, South Brisbane, Hibernian Hall in Roma, St Patricks Church, Gympie, and St Nicholas Russian Orthodox Cathedral, Brisbane.

Cavanagh was the vice president of the Queensland Institute of Architects in 1930 and between 1932 and 1934. He was also the president of the Town Planning Association of Queensland between 1936 and 1939.

Cavanagh died in Adelaide on 6 May 1957.
