= Pioneer Shire Council Building =

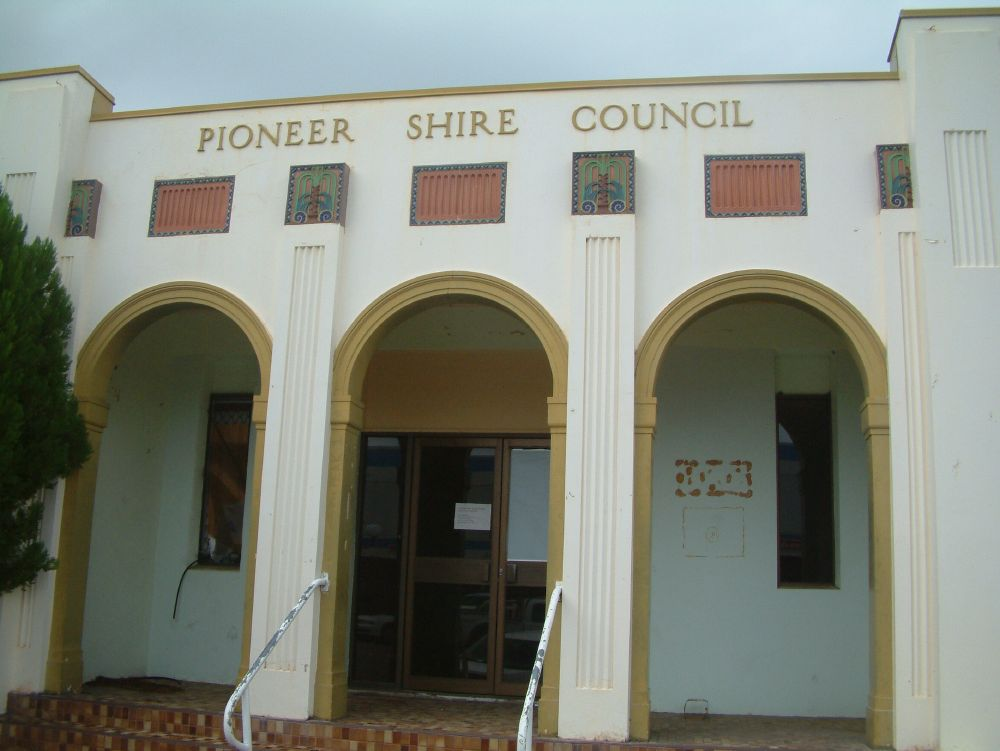
- Pioneer Shire Council Building, 2006

- Location within Queensland Location within Australia
- 21.1399°S 149.1864°E
- Location: 1 Wood Street, Mackay, Mackay Region, Queensland, Australia

History
- Built: 1935

Site notes
- Architect: Harold Vivian Marsh Brown

Queensland Heritage Register
- Official name: Pioneer Shire Council Building (former)
- Type: state heritage (built)
- Designated: 7 December 2007
- Reference no.: 602603
- Significant period: 1935–
- Significant components: council chamber/meeting room
- Builders: William Patrick Guthrie

Pioneer Shire Council Building is a heritage-listed town hall at 1 Wood Street, Mackay, Mackay Region, Queensland, Australia. It was designed by Harold Vivian Marsh Brown and built in 1935 by William Patrick Guthrie. It was added to the Queensland Heritage Register on 7 December 2007.

== History ==
The former Pioneer Shire Council Building was constructed to a design by Harold Vivian Marsh Brown in 1935 and occupied by the Pioneer Shire Council until 1994 when the Pioneer Shire was amalgamated with the Mackay City Council.

John Mackay and John McCrossin first explored the area in which the Pioneer Shire was located in 1860. Returning to the area in 1862, Mackay established and subsequently lost, the extensive pastoral holding he had named "Greenmount". The township of Mackay, originally named Alexandra, was surveyed in June 1863. The first town allotments were offered for sale from the police station in Bowen in October 1863. Two years after the establishment of Mackay, the first sugar was planted on the Pioneer Plantation, introducing to the region its key agricultural product and industry.

The first local government body formed in the Pioneer Valley region was the Mackay Municipal Council, which first met on 1 December 1869.

The Pioneer Divisional Board was proclaimed in November 1879, the same year the Divisional Boards Act was enacted and first met in the Mackay School of Arts building on 13 March 1880. The Act established local government boards to administer parts of the State. In many cases these divisions surrounded regional towns or cities, some eighteen of which had been incorporated by 1878.

The offices of the Pioneer Divisional Board were located within the boundaries of another local government area, the City of Mackay. Shire/town relationships of this type were not uncommon in Queensland, as the town was often the most convenient location for residents of the shire to meet. Other examples are the former Mulgrave Shire Council Chambers (1912–13) that remain in Cairns and the first North Rockhampton Borough Chambers (1885) in Rockhampton.

When formed, the Pioneer Division consisted of three subdivisions, each of which returned three members. The board's first members were JE Davidson (chair), MH Black, R Martin, EM Long, W Hyne, A Kemmis, David Dalrymple, D Lacy and ES Rawson. A number of these men owned sugar plantations.

Office space for the new Pioneer Divisional Board was rented in the Mackay School of Arts. A divisional clerk and a clerk of works were appointed. The Board held meetings on the second Tuesday of each month. Throughout the 1880s and subsequently, many of the Pioneer Divisional Board's members were involved in the sugar industry. Robert Walker of Fairleigh Plantation, the second chairman, was one of the sugar pioneers. Walter Paget, a councillor from 1883 and chairman from 1885 to 1890 and 1901, constructed with his brother Arthur a sugar mill at Nindaroo Plantation. Like David Dalrymple, Walter Paget entered the Queensland Parliament, serving as a Member of the Queensland Legislative Assembly from 1901 to 1915.

In the late 1800s those involved in primary production required strong local government organisations to establish the road infrastructure needed to transport goods into and out of a region. As the sugar industry in the Pioneer Valley expanded, bridges became a priority. From 1886 through the Joint Bridges Board, responsibility for bridges was shared between the Pioneer Divisional Board and the Mackay Municipal Council. The first Sydney Street Bridge was completed in August 1887. Constructed in 1888, the Barnes Creek Bridge was also a responsibility of the Joint Bridges Board.

By 1884 a total of 19,320 acres (7,820 ha) of land in the valley was being used to grow sugar cane, processed in the main through privately owned plantation mills. A downturn in the sugar industry, attributed to an oversupply of beet sugar in Europe and the phasing out of Melanesian indentured labour, led to a move away from the plantation system and towards efficient central mills. Following recovery from the downturn, the Mackay region experienced a period of moderate growth, from mid 1885 to the 1920s, in both sugar production and population.

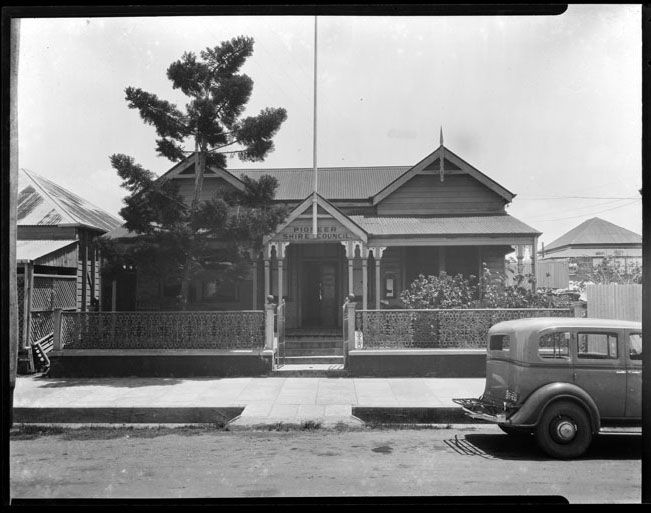
First Pioneer Shire Council Building made from timber

The Pioneer Divisional Board office relocated from the School of Arts building after its first purpose-built timber office building was constructed in 1889 on the western side of Wood Street.

A number of significant changes to the local government of the region occurred in the first two decades of the Twentieth Century. The Local Authorities Act (1902) widened the powers of local governments, giving these bodies more extensive powers over roads and bridges as well as responsibility for the impounding of animals, the generation of electric and gas lighting and control over traffic.

Mackay was declared a town in 1902, making the municipal council now the Mackay Town Council. Mackay was declared a city in 1918.

In 1903 the Pioneer Divisional Board became the Pioneer Shire Council, its subdivisions subsequently renamed divisions. During this period, as a means of opening the Upper Pioneer Valley to closer settlement, the Pioneer Shire Council funded the extension of the Pioneer Valley railway line from Pinnacle to Finch Hatton. This extension was opened on 21 September 1904. The Queensland Government completed the last extension to the Pioneer Valley line, west to Netherdale, after its takeover of the Finch Hatton section on 1 July 1910. This action made more land available for sugar cane growing, as well as allowing tourists easier access to the Eungella Range.

During these two decades the boundaries of the Pioneer Shire were reduced when the Sarina Shire was formed to its south on 1 January 1912. Mirani Shire, excised from the western section of the Pioneer Shire, established its offices in Mirani in 1913.

Members of the Pioneer Shire Council were also members of the wider community and supportive of regional growth. William Kirkup of Walkerston owned a store and bakery while serving as chairman initially from 1902 to 1907, then for a range of years until 1927. Robert Kippen was a carrier, plantation supervisor, storekeeper, dairyman and publican, as well as shire chairman 1907 to 1908, then 1914–15 and 1921–24. Another publican with sugar and pastoral interests, Edward "Ned" Hannan, served as a member of the Mirani and Pioneer Shires for various periods between 1905 and 1946. Councillors also looked after the interests of the Shire through representation on the Harbour Board following its formation in 1896.

Mackay and the Pioneer River district experienced a period of considerable economic growth during the interwar years. In part, this was due to continued expansion within the sugar industry. Adding impetus to this was the connection of Mackay by the North Coast railway line to Rockhampton, in 1921, and Townsville in 1923. By 1923 the population of Mackay was 6,350 and the district some 15,000. The close relationship between the two local government areas continued.

During the 1930s major public works projects were undertaken in the Mackay region. Work commenced on a new Outer Harbour for Mackay in 1935. The following year work began on a new bridge over the Pioneer River at Sydney Street, to replace the earlier one damaged in the 1918 cyclone. When completed, the new bridge was named the Forgan Bridge after the mother of the local Member of the Queensland Legislative Assembly and then Premier of Queensland, William Forgan Smith.

Growth of its administrative section during this period of regional economic growth prompted the Pioneer Shire Council to relocate its offices, this time to the opposite side of Wood Street in Mackay. Designed in the Art Deco style by prominent local architect HVM Brown, the Pioneer Shire Council Building was erected by W Guthrie for a cost of £2,337. The new office was officially opened to business on Monday18 March 1935.

Harold Vivian Marsh Brown (c.1907–1992) was born in Mackay. Educated at the Mackay High School and the Brisbane Technical College, from 1926 to 1930. He worked as an articled pupil of Cavanagh and Cavanagh in Brisbane, being registered as an architect in 1930, before establishing his architectural business in Mackay around 1932. In the years to 1940 Brown designed approximately thirteen buildings in Mackay, including a number of fine examples of the Art Deco style. These include the Kane & Legge Building in Brisbane Street (his own office), Chaseley House, the Imperial Hotel, the CWA building, the RSL Memorial Hall in Sydney Street, Black's Building, Maguire's Hotel in Wood Street, the Holy Trinity Anglican Church Rectory and Hall (later the Masonic Club) in Gordon Street, the Hotel Mackay in Victoria Street and St Mary's Catholic Church & Presbytery in Mackay South.

Harold Brown's Art Deco council building served the Pioneer Shire adequately until the 1950s when conditions again became too cramped. In 1958 a decision was made to extend the building towards the rear of the site. A second storey has since been added in one of the two refurbishments, which have been undertaken since the 1950s.

The Pioneer district continued to grow post-war. In 1966 Mackay's population was 18,640 while the population of the Pioneer Shire was 19,990. By the early 1990s the Shire had reached 40,592 while Mackay city housed 23,056.

In March 1994 the Pioneer Shire amalgamated with the Mackay City Council and the Pioneer Shire Council Building was vacated. Gordon White, the last Pioneer Shire chairman, had held the position since 1983. Following the amalgamation he served as mayor of Mackay City until 1999.

== Description ==
The former Pioneer Shire Council Building is a small, reinforced concrete building in the Art Deco style on Wood Street.

The Wood Street facade is divided into three sections. The central section has 3 round arches on square pilasters, two free standing and two half-width engaged on the outsides. These pilasters are fluted with a zigzag cut, and topped with a square capital of coloured glazed terracotta featuring a stylised design representing sugar cane, nautilus shells and perhaps palm fronds surrounded by a zigzag border. These glazed terracotta panels are part of a row of seven beneath the roofline. The words "PIONEER SHIRE COUNCIL" appear in low relief above the glazed panels and central entrance section. The front rises to a horizontal parapet.

Each side section is a square tower slightly higher and marginally in front of the centre section. These are decorated with low relief coffering. Three slit windows are let into each. A wooden, tapering square section flagpole is mounted towards the outer edge of each side.

A light well is constructed in the side elevations admitting light to the interior. The building is attached to the former Post Office (Telstra Building) on the northern side by a metal roof forming a covered driveway.

Five steps lead up to the entry porch or veranda, at the back of which is a single central door of glass and aluminium. Original detailing, believed to be of pressed metal, on the ceiling of the porch is intact, while the floor features later tiles.

The front entrance opens to a central passageway that leads to the rear of the original building. The layout of the original building has a strong symmetry about the axis of the central passageway with various rooms opening to either side. A strongroom is located in an office on the northern side of the building. Original ceiling fabric is extant above the later suspended ceilings.

At the rear of the original building the space that was once the Council chambers is now subdivided into several rooms. A decorative archway remains at the rear extent of the original building.

Behind the original 1935 building to the east is a later two-storey metal framed and clad building that also extends above the original building in the area that comprised the former council chambers. This extension is not significant.

== Heritage listing ==
The former Pioneer Shire Council Building was listed on the Queensland Heritage Register on 7 December 2007 having satisfied the following criteria.

The place is important in demonstrating the evolution or pattern of Queensland's history.

The Pioneer Shire Council Building is important in demonstrating the evolution of Queensland's history, specifically the development of the provision of services and infrastructure to rural Queensland through the establishment of divisional boards and shire councils.

The Pioneer Shire Council Building situated in central Mackay is important in illustrating the pattern of Queensland's history, specifically the administrative relationship between a shire council and an adjoining town or city council. It is a good surviving example of rural shire council building made redundant by the absorption of the rural shire into the town/city shire within which its office was located.

Constructed in 1935 during a major program of beautification and modernisation of services when Mackay was the fastest growing town in Queensland, the Pioneer Shire Council Building is tangible evidence of this period of growth and modernisation.

The place is important in demonstrating the principal characteristics of a particular class of cultural places.

As one of his earlier Mackay buildings, the Pioneer Shire Council Building illustrates the principal characteristics of the work of prominent Mackay architect Harold Vivian Marsh Brown. As the designer of 13 buildings during the interwar period HVM Brown made an important contribution to the commercial centre of Mackay.

The Pioneer Shire Council Building is good example of the Art Deco style transplanted to rural Queensland. With its geometric facade stylised decoration, terracotta tiles and prominent lettering it demonstrates the characteristics of this style.

The place is important because of its aesthetic significance.

As one of a number of Art Deco style buildings constructed in Mackay and many sugar industry towns during the interwar period, and for the contribution the Art Deco facade with tropical motifs makes to Wood Street, the Pioneer Shire Council Building is important because of its aesthetic significance.
