= Harold Vivian Marsh Brown =

Australian architect

Harold Vivian Marsh Brown (c.1907–1992) was an Australian architect, practising in Mackay, Queensland. Some of his works are now heritage-listed.

== Early life ==
Harold Vivian Marsh Brown was born in Mackay. He was educated at the Mackay High School and the Brisbane Technical College from 1926 to 1930.

== Architectural career ==
Brown worked as an articled pupil of Cavanagh & Cavanagh in Brisbane, being registered as an architect in 1930, before establishing his architectural business in Mackay around 1932. In the years to 1940 Brown designed approximately thirteen buildings in Mackay, including a number of fine examples of the Art Deco style.

== Significant works ==
Brown's significant works include:

- Pioneer Shire Council Building
- Kane & Legge Building in Brisbane Street (his own office)
- Chaseley House
- Imperial Hotel
- the CWA building
- the RSL Memorial Hall in Sydney Street
- Black's Building
- Maguire's Hotel in Wood Street
- The Holy Trinity Anglican Church Rectory and Hall (later the Masonic Club) in Gordon Street
- the Hotel Mackay in Victoria Street
- St Mary's Catholic Church & Presbytery in Mackay South.
