= Redemptorist Monastery =

Redemptorist Monastery may refer to:

- Redemptorist Monastery, Kinnoull, Perth, Scotland
- Redemptorist Monastery, North Perth, Western Australia
