= Cavanagh and Cavanagh =

Australian architectural partnership

Cavanagh and Cavanagh was an architectural partnership in Australia, active in both Western Australia and Queensland. The partners were brothers Michael Cavanagh and James Cavanagh.

== History ==
In 1900 Michael Cavanagh was joined by his younger brother James as partners in the architectural practice, Cavanagh and Cavanagh. The firm had a long association with the Catholic Church, designing a number of hospitals, schools and churches.

== Significant works ==
- 1901: St Joseph's Boys' Orphanage (Clontarf Aboriginal College)
- 1902: P&O Hotel, Fremantle
- 1902: St Mary's Roman Catholic Church, Kalgoorlie
- 1902: Orient Hotel, Fremantle
- 1902 Manning Buildings & Chambers, Fremantle
- 1903: Redemptorist Monastery, North Perth
- 1909: Fremantle Fire Station
- 1909: St Anne’s Croatian Roman Catholic Church, North Fremantle
- 1915: St Brigid's Convent, North Perth
- 1923: Alterations and additions to St Mary's Cathedral, Perth
- 1923: Completion of St Patricks Church, Gympie
- 1923: St Patrick's Church, Katanning
- 1927: Major alternations to Tara House (Irish Club) in Brisbane
- 1929: Extensions to St. Mary's Catholic Church, South Brisbane
- 1931: Hibernian Hall, Roma, Queensland
- 1931: Mt Hawthorn Hotel (Paddington Ale House), Mt Hawthorn
- 1935: St Nicholas Russian Orthodox Cathedral, Brisbane
- 1937: Rostrevor Flats, Perth (now entrance to Mercedes College, Perth)
- 1937: Alterations and additions to Victoria Hotel, Toodyay
