= Hibernian Australasian Catholic Benefit Society =

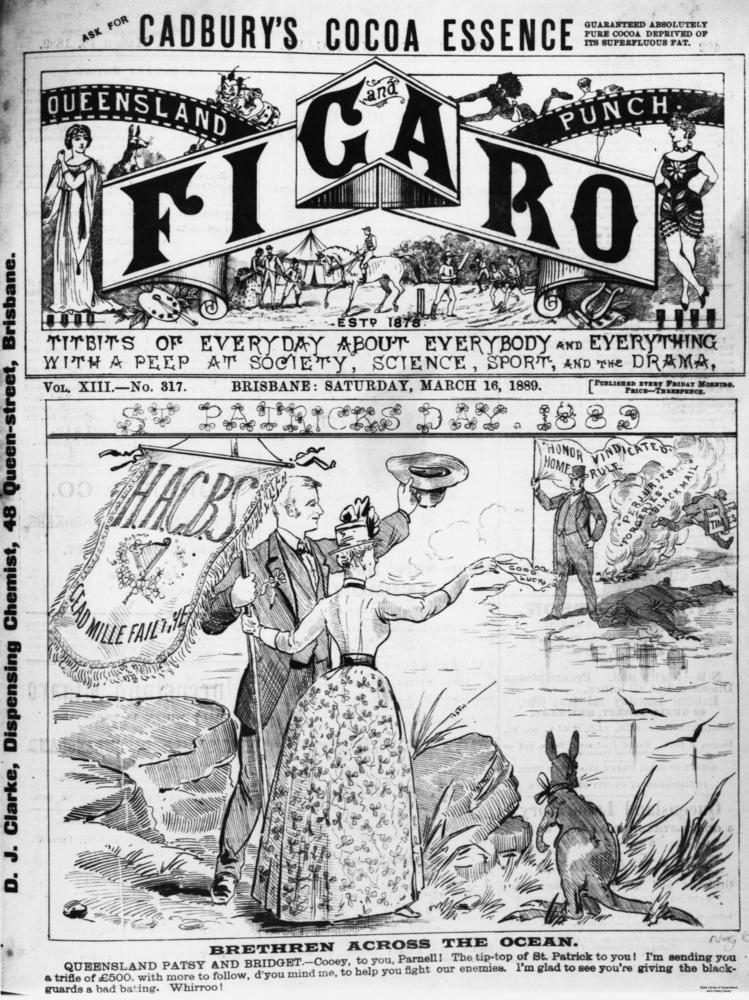
Queensland Figaro and Punch cover, 16 March 1889, depicting a male and a female member of the HACBS offering enthusiastic support to Parnell's struggle for Home Rule.

The Hibernian Australian Catholic Benefit Society (HACBS) was a church-based support network. It was founded in 1868 by a group of Irish immigrants, including Mark Young.

In 1857 Young arrived in the colony of Victoria from Ireland. He moved to Ballarat, where he worked in a variety of occupations, including keeping a store with his brother. In 1861 he joined a gold rush to Otago, New Zealand, returning to Ballarat in 1862. Young ran the White Hart Hotel in Sturt Street and became very active in local affairs. He assisted other Irishmen in the foundation of the Ballarat Hibernian Benefit Society and later worked to achieve the amalgamation of that society with the Australian Catholic Benefit Society to form the Hibernian Australian Catholic Benefit Society. He was elected as its first president.

The Society supported St Patrick's Day parades. In 1953 sixty of its branches marched in the Melbourne parade.

The State Library of New South Wales holds extensive records of the H.A.C.B.S.

== Significant buildings ==
A number of halls & offices constructed by the society remain and some are now heritage listed. The halls include:

- Hibernian House, Surry Hills, New South Wales, built in 1924
- Hibernian Hall, Roma, Queensland, built in 1932
- Storey Hall, Melbourne
- building built in 1917 with H.A.C.B.S, 87 Hill Street, Orange
