= P&O Hotel (Fremantle) =

Heritage-listed building in Fremantle, Western Australia

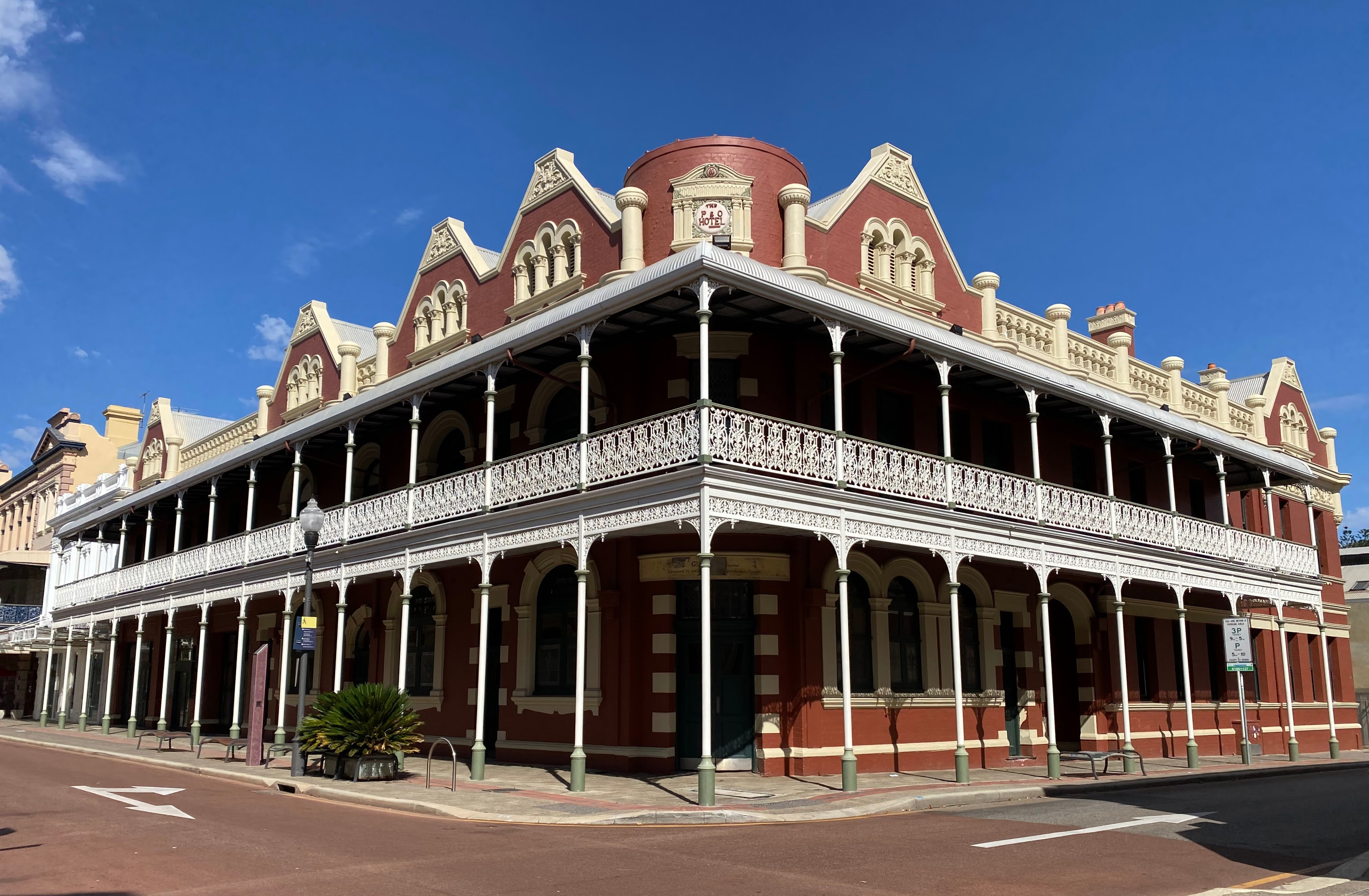
- P&O Hotel from north-west corner of High and Mouat streets in 2023
- Interactive map of the P&O Hotel area

General information
- Architectural style: Federation Filigree
- Location: 25 High Street, Fremantle, Western Australia
- Coordinates: 32.0552°S 115.7436°E
- Current tenants: University of Notre Dame Australia
- Completed: 1901
- Opened: 1 July 1901
- Renovated: 1938, 2000
- Cost: £8,000
- Renovation cost: £A 1,600

Technical details
- Floor count: 2

Design and construction
- Architecture firm: Cavanagh and Cavanagh
- Main contractor: Harry L. Roe

Western Australia Heritage Register
- Type: State Registered Place
- Part of: West End, Fremantle (25225)
- Reference no.: 911

The P&O Hotel is a heritage listed building located at 25 High Street on the corner of Mouat Street in Fremantle, Western Australia. It was one of many commercial buildings constructed in Fremantle during the gold boom period in the late nineteenth and early twentieth century.

== Description ==
The corner building is a two-storey Federation Filigree style structure. Its highly decorative parapet has five large pediments featuring stilted arches with columns and decorative stucco along with balustrade and columns. The corner of the building parapet has the remains of a dome inscribed with the name The P&O Hotel in decorative stucco. The top of the dome has been removed. Both storeys feature large multi-paned windows with stucco architraves. The High Street and Mouat Street frontage features a bull nose veranda with extensive iron lacework and a truncated corner main entrance.

When it opened in 1901 the hotel's frontage along High Street took up half of the block to Henry Street, with a 34-metre (110 ft) frontage along Mouat Street. The building consisted of two bars, a large saloon, three private parlours, lavatories, a dressing room, dining rooms, and three shops on the ground floor. Upstairs there was another large saloon with two billiard tables, sitting rooms, bathroom and 21 bedrooms. The kitchens, sculleries and pantries were located at the rear of the building with the interior yard containing stables and coach houses. The entire street frontage of the building was surrounded by wide verandahs. The building was completed at a cost of £8,000, equivalent to A$1.4 million in 2022, by contractor Harry L. Roe under the instructions of the architects Cavanagh and Cavanagh.

== History ==
The site was originally occupied by a much smaller establishment, the Victoria Hotel, which was built in the 1870s. In 1888 it was owned by Patrick Hagan, who was also the licensee. Hagan died in 1891 and left his entire estate, including both this establishment and the National Hotel to his brother James. The brother sold both the Victoria and the National hotels in 1893. Nicholas Gilbert became the licensee of the Victoria Hotel in 1895 and remained there until 1896. The Victoria Hotel was sold again in 1898 then rebuilt to the current exterior and renamed as the P&O Hotel. John Quigley was granted a licence for the hotel in the same year, and the P&O Hotel was opened on 1 July 1901. It consisted of two bars, accommodation upstairs and stables at the rear. A number of shops and restaurants occupied the High Street frontage. A new publican's licence had been granted to W. A. Grenike in early June, prior to the hotel opening.

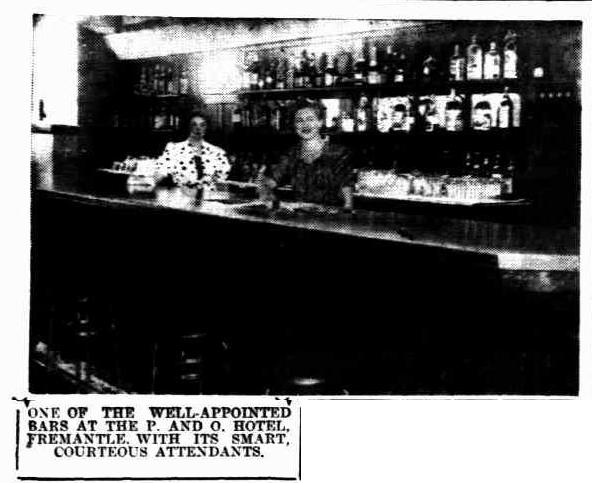
Bar at the P&O Hotel shortly after a major renovation

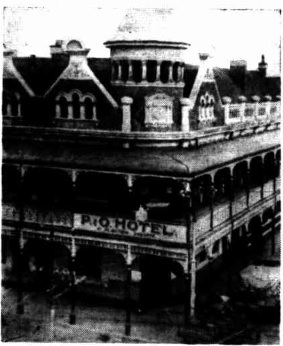
P&O Hotel, 1938

The hotel was taken over in 1902 by John Leslie. Leslie was charged with having sold adulterated liquor at the premises in 1905. He left in 1912, with E. H. Fielder taking over the same year. By 1913 Andrew Elliot was the new proprietor, and in 1914 it was under new management again with Paul Reichards taking over.

By 1938 the hotel had a major interior renovation with two extra bars being added. The proprietor at this time was Clem Bahen, who spent £A 1,600 on alterations and renovations. Improvements included modern lighting and refrigeration being installed, leadlighting being added, new fittings and repainting. The contractor for the renovations was Frank Rennie, and the plumbing contractor was A. H. Forster.

In the 1950s the impressive two-storey verandah was demolished and replaced with a box style awning. By 2000 the building was in poor condition and a 21-year lease was granted to the University of Notre Dame, who began a large scale renovation, with work being completed in early 2001. The building was used for student accommodation; the first intake of foreign students arrived in 2001.

In May 2023, Nic Trimboli and Adrian Fini purchased the building for A$5.3 million. They plan to revitalise it for use as a hotel. The building was used for a Fremantle Biennale arts event in November 2025 prior to the commencement of renovations.

== See also ==
- List of heritage places in Fremantle
