= John Bathersby =

Australian Roman Catholic bishop (1936–2020)

The Most Reverend John Bathersby
- Archbishop of Brisbane
- Province: Brisbane
- Diocese: Brisbane
- Installed: 3 December 1991
- Term ended: 14 November 2011
- Predecessor: Francis Rush
- Successor: Mark Coleridge

Orders
- Ordination: 30 June 1961 (priest)
- Consecration: 20 March 1986 (bishop)

Personal details
- Born: John Alexius Bathersby; 26 July 1936 Stanthorpe, Queensland, Australia
- Died: 9 March 2020 (aged 83) Brisbane, Queensland, Australia
- Denomination: Roman Catholic Church
- Parents: John and Grace Bathersby (née Conquest)
- Occupation: Bishop
- Education: Pius XII Seminary; Pontifical Gregorian University; Terasianum University

Styles of John Bathersby
- Reference style: The Most Reverend
- Spoken style: Your Grace
- Religious style: Emeritus Archbishop
- Posthumous style: not applicable

John Alexius Bathersby (26 July 1936 – 9 March 2020) was an Australian bishop of the Roman Catholic Church. He was the sixth archbishop of the Archdiocese of Brisbane, serving from 1991 until his retirement in 2011. Bathersby was conferred with the title Emeritus Archbishop of Brisbane.

== Early years ==
Bathersby was born in Stanthorpe, Queensland. The son of John Thomas and Grace Maud (née Conquest), he had an older sister, Carmel, a younger brother, Michael, and two younger sisters, Suzanne and Anne. He received his primary schooling at St Joseph's School in Stanthorpe (1941–50) and his secondary schooling as a boarder at Nudgee College in Brisbane (1951–54). From school he entered the Pius XII Provincial Seminary, Banyo, where he began his training for the priesthood and, on completion of those studies (1955–61), he was ordained a priest in his home parish of Stanthorpe by Bishop William Brennan on 30 June 1961.

His first seven years as a priest were spent as an assistant and administrator at Goondiwindi before being sent to Rome in 1969 for further studies where he completed a licentiate in theology at the Pontifical Gregorian University and a diploma in spirituality at the Pontifical Theological Faculty Teresianum. In 1972 he was appointed to the staff of Pius XII Seminary in Brisbane where he was a spiritual director for seven years before returning to Rome for a doctorate in theology and spirituality in 1979. He returned to the seminary before being appointed Bishop of Cairns in 1986.

== Bishop of Cairns and Archbishop of Brisbane ==
On 20 March 1986, Bathersby was consecrated Bishop of Cairns by Archbishop Francis Rush, whom he would succeed in the Archdiocese of Brisbane on 3 December 1991, and installed as the sixth Bishop (and fifth Archbishop) of Brisbane on 30 January 1992.

Bathersby was a member of the International Catholic-Methodist Dialogue from 1989 to 1995 and a member of the executive of the Confederation of Bishops' Conferences of Oceania from 1991 to May 1994. He was co-chairman of the Australian Catholic–Uniting Church Dialogue. From July 1997 he served as President of the National Council of Churches in Australia until July 2000. In January 2001, Pope John Paul II appointed Bathersby as co-chair of the International Anglican-Roman Catholic Working Group (IARCCUM). He chaired the Australian Catholic Bishops Conference Commission for Mission and Faith Formation, and was a member of the Bishops' Permanent Committee.

In 2008, St. Mary's Catholic Church, South Brisbane was the subject of controversy following complaints that long-serving parish priest Peter Kennedy was not observing standard Roman Catholic teachings and practices. However Kennedy's services were extremely popular attracting a very large congregation, many of whom felt otherwise alienated from the Catholic Church. Despite numerous attempts by Bathersby to persuade Kennedy to return to a more standard liturgy, Kennedy refused. Bathersby eventually removed Kennedy as the parish priest. Many of Kennedy's parishioners left the church with him to continue holding services as St Mary's Community in Exile at the Trades and Labour Council building on Peel Street (200m away from St Mary's Catholic Church).

Upon turning 75 years old, in July 2011, Bathersby sought the pontiff's consent to retire. The Bishop of Lismore, Geoffrey Jarrett, was appointed administrator for the Brisbane archdiocese in November 2011 and, in April 2012, Mark Coleridge was appointed as the seventh archbishop.

Bathersby died on 9 March 2020 at Brisbane's Wesley Hospital from a stroke.

== In popular culture ==
In 2011, a feature documentary was made about Kennedy and the exiled community and their conflict with the Catholic Church, entitled The Trouble with St Mary's.

In 2016, the play St Mary's in Exile was written by David Burton about the events that led to Bathersby's decision to remove Father Peter Kennedy as parish priest from St Mary's Catholic Church, South Brisbane in 2009. It was performed in August–September 2016 as part of the Brisbane Festival at the Queensland Theatre Company's Bille Brown Theatre, approximately 250m from both St Mary's and St Mary's in Exile. Actor Josh McWilliam played the role of Bathersby.

Catholic Church titles
Preceded by John Ahern Torpie	8th Catholic Bishop of Cairns; 1986–1991	Succeeded by James Foley
Preceded by Francis Roberts Rush	6th Catholic Archbishop of Brisbane; 1991–2011	Succeeded by Mark Coleridge
