= Peter Kennedy (priest) =

Australian priest

Peter Kennedy is an Australian priest. He formerly served as the administrator of St. Mary's Catholic Church, South Brisbane, but was removed from his position following complaints that the church was not observing standard Roman Catholic teachings and practices. His removal drew much media attention and the majority of his 700 parishioners left with him to form an independent congregation known as "St Mary's Community in Exile".

== St Mary's controversy ==
At the time of his removal, Kennedy had been a priest for over 40 years, 28 of which were spent at St Mary's. He had frequently come into conflict with church authorities. On 22 August 2008, Archbishop John Bathersby wrote to Kennedy to request that he address certain contentious practices in his parish. The issues, which were listed under the headings of "faith", "liturgy", "governance" and "authority", included questions of whether Kennedy encouraged belief in Jesus Christ and the Holy Trinity as well as objections to the potential invalidity of the Masses and baptisms Kennedy celebrated. The parish also blessed homosexual couples and allowed women to preach.

The archbishop's concerns were not addressed to his satisfaction and he initially called for Kennedy to resign voluntarily before 18 February 2009. When Kennedy failed to do so, he was informed the next day that he had been officially removed from his position. Kennedy, however, refused to step down at first, despite another priest being sent by the Roman Catholic Archdiocese of Brisbane to replace him. Kennedy and the archbishop threatened each other with legal action and the archdiocese accused Kennedy of refusing to hand over the keys to the church buildings, before both parties eventually agreed to mediation. Kennedy finally agreed to hold his final Mass on 19 April 2009, then surrendering his keys and allowing a handover of the parish to the archdiocese.

== St Mary's in Exile ==
Kennedy continues to operate as the spiritual leader of "St Mary's in Exile", a community of former parishioners of St Mary's Church and other sympathisers. On 3 June 2009, Archbishop Bathersby laicised Kennedy due to his intention to continue leading the group. Since the removal of his faculties, Kennedy and his community have operated out of the Trade and Labour Council Building in South Brisbane.

== Community outreach ==
Under Kennedy's leadership, St Mary's Parish was known as a haven for marginalised individuals and Aboriginal Australians. Aboriginal activist Sam Watson was among those parishioners who expressed wholehearted support for Kennedy during the St Mary's controversy. Micah Projects is a social change NGO which had its foundation at St Mary's community with a mission to "create justice and respond to injustice at the personal, social and structural levels in church, government, business and society."

== In popular culture ==
In 2011, a feature documentary was made about Kennedy and the exiled community and their conflict with the Catholic Church, entitled The Trouble with St Mary's.

In 2016, a play, St Mary's in Exile, was written by David Burton about the events that led to the removal of Kennedy as parish priest. It was performed in August-September 2016 as part of the Brisbane Festival at the Queensland Theatre Company's Bille Brown Theatre, approximately 250m from both St Mary's and St Mary's in Exile. The actor Peter Marshall played the role of Kennedy.
