= Victoria Hotel (Toodyay) =

Hotel in Toodyay, Western Australia

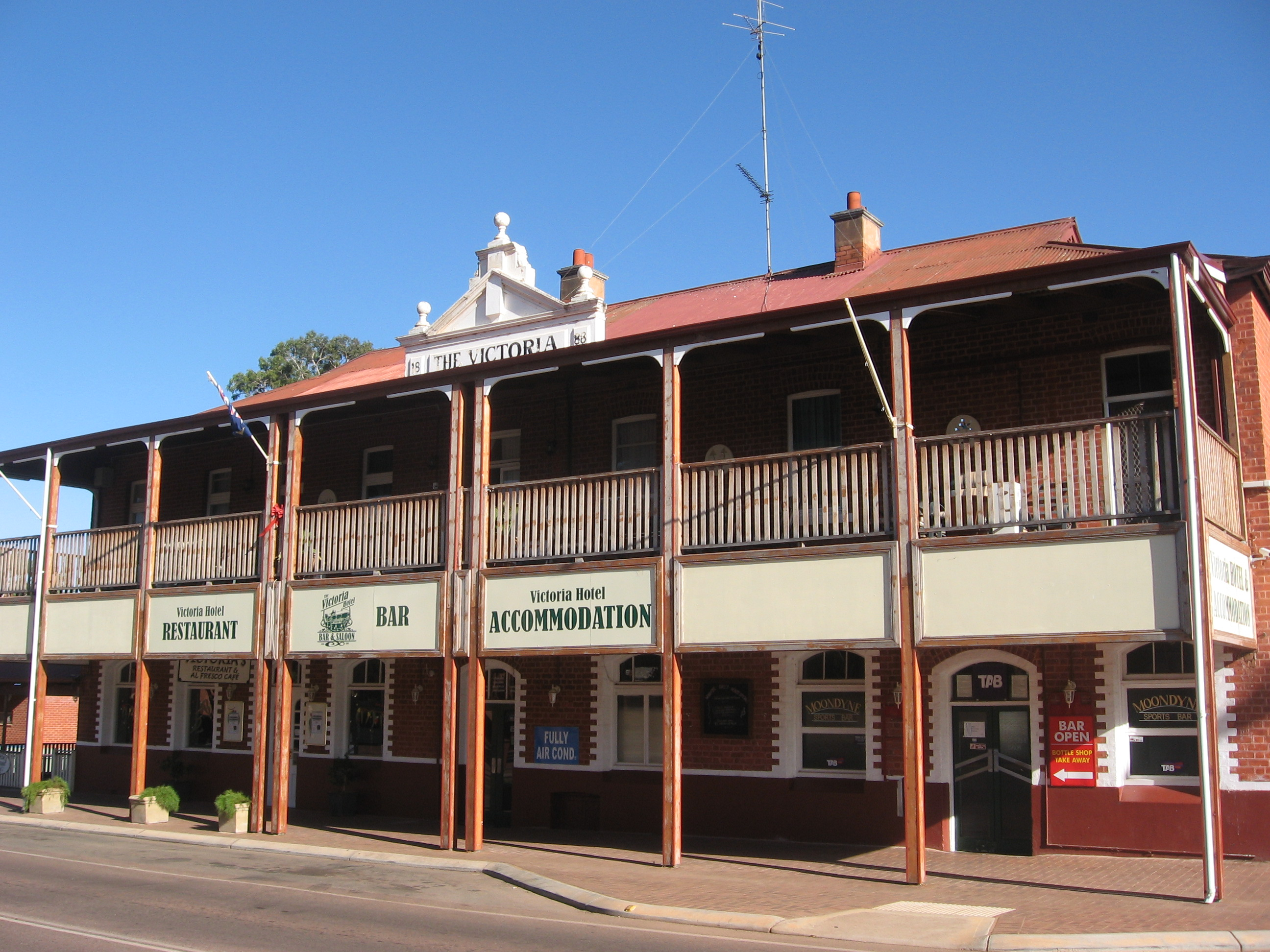
- Victoria Hotel, Toodyay
- Interactive map of the Victoria Hotel area
- Former names: Woods Store
- Alternative names: Victoria Hotel Motel

General information
- Architectural style: Victorian Georgian
- Location: 114-116 Stirling Terrace, Toodyay
- Coordinates: 31.550°S 116.4673°E
- Completed: 1864
- Renovated: 1875, 1899, 1904, 1908, 1937, 1950s, 1970s, 2018
- Owner: Dean and Amanda Carter

Design and construction
- Architects: C.H. Whiteford, Northam (1891), T.B. Jackson, Perth (1904),
- Architecture firm: Cavanagh, Cavanagh and Allom (1937)
- Main contractor: George Henry Hasell (1864), H. Davey (1899)

References
- Toodyay municipal inventory

The Victoria Hotel is a hotel located on Stirling Terrace in Toodyay, Western Australia. The site was classified by the National Trust of Australia in 1977 and added to the Register of National Estates in 1980.

== History ==
The village of Toodyay was established in 1836. In 1864, George Hasell constructed a single storey building to be a store, owned and operated by James Thomas Woods. The bricks were made at the riverside and the lime was carried in from Clackline. Woods obtained a storekeeper's gallon licence and in 1875, added eight rooms to the store. From 1880, the "long room" functioned as a ballroom and hosted dances. In 1882, Woods applied for a Billiard and Bagatelle License. In 1888 Woods converted the store into a licensed premises, which he called the Victoria Hotel.

In 1892, Charles Corpaccioli leased the Victoria Hotel from J.T. Woods for a yearly rental of £100. In 1894 the first annual dinner of the Toodyay Vine and Fruitgrowers’ Association overtaxed the capacity of the dining room when 60-70 gentlemen sat down for a meal and "over a score were unable to find seats". Also in January 1894, ice cream was introduced at the hotel.

In 1896, James Butler was the licensee followed by John F. Cavanah in 1897. In March 1898, the Northam Advertiser mentioned bricks being on site for extensions to the hotel. In September 1899, the same newspaper also noted a billiard room adjoining the hotel (now evolved into the present day Victoria Billiard Saloon) was nearing completion. The billiard hall was positioned behind a hairdresser and a second shop, which was being enlarged for a jeweler.

In December 1900, Mr. Cavanah died and his widow, M.H. Cavanah, became the proprietress of the hotel. In September 1902, she married Frederick George Ashbourne Treadgold, who became the licensee in 1902.

In January 1903, the Victoria Hotel was the only hotel in Toodyay with ice. In late 1903, a tender was accepted for the erection of a second storey along with other improvements. Mr. Treadgold was given permission to erect a balcony over the footpath in front of the hotel. The second storey was completed in 1904.

In 1906, Thomas John Donegan had taken over management of the Victoria Hotel and, in 1908, had an annex added to the western section of the building. The cordials and aerated waters required for the hotel were manufactured on the premises. Before World War I the hotel was the rendezvous of the local volunteer Light Horse Regiment. In 1935, Patrick "Paddy" Andrew Connolly, James Ryan and Sydney Herbert Reidy-Crofts bought the hotel from Donegan.

In March 1937, Mr. EJ Parker (aged 37) became the licensee managing the hotel on behalf of the Avon Brewery Company. However, only a few months later on July 16, Parker would flee the hotel with all his belongings, having stolen more than £90. Parker left an apologetic note behind in the safe, posting the safe keys back to the hotel from Melbourne by airmail, though the safe had already been drilled open by the time the keys arrived. Parker was tracked down quickly at Burnie, Tasmania by August 6. He was brought back to Western Australia to face charges of "stealing as a servant", to which he admitted his guilt in September.

In 1937 repairs and renovations were undertaken by the architectural firm Cavanagh, Cavanagh and Allom. In May 1939 "excellent cuisine and garage space" were being advertised as amenities of the hotel and by June hot water had been installed. From August to October 1941, the weekly tariff was advertised as £2/2/-.

In 1946 Leslie Bartlett purchased the property and carried out further renovations, including adding a beer garden in the 1950s. More alterations were made in the 1970s, including renovating the Billiard Saloon and incorporating it into the hotel as a lounge. Renovations in 2018 included a rear extension and new kitchen. Today the upper storey of the building has an enclosed balustrade while the ground floor has an open verandah.
