= St Nicholas Russian Orthodox Cathedral, Brisbane =

St Nicholas Russian Orthodox Cathedral
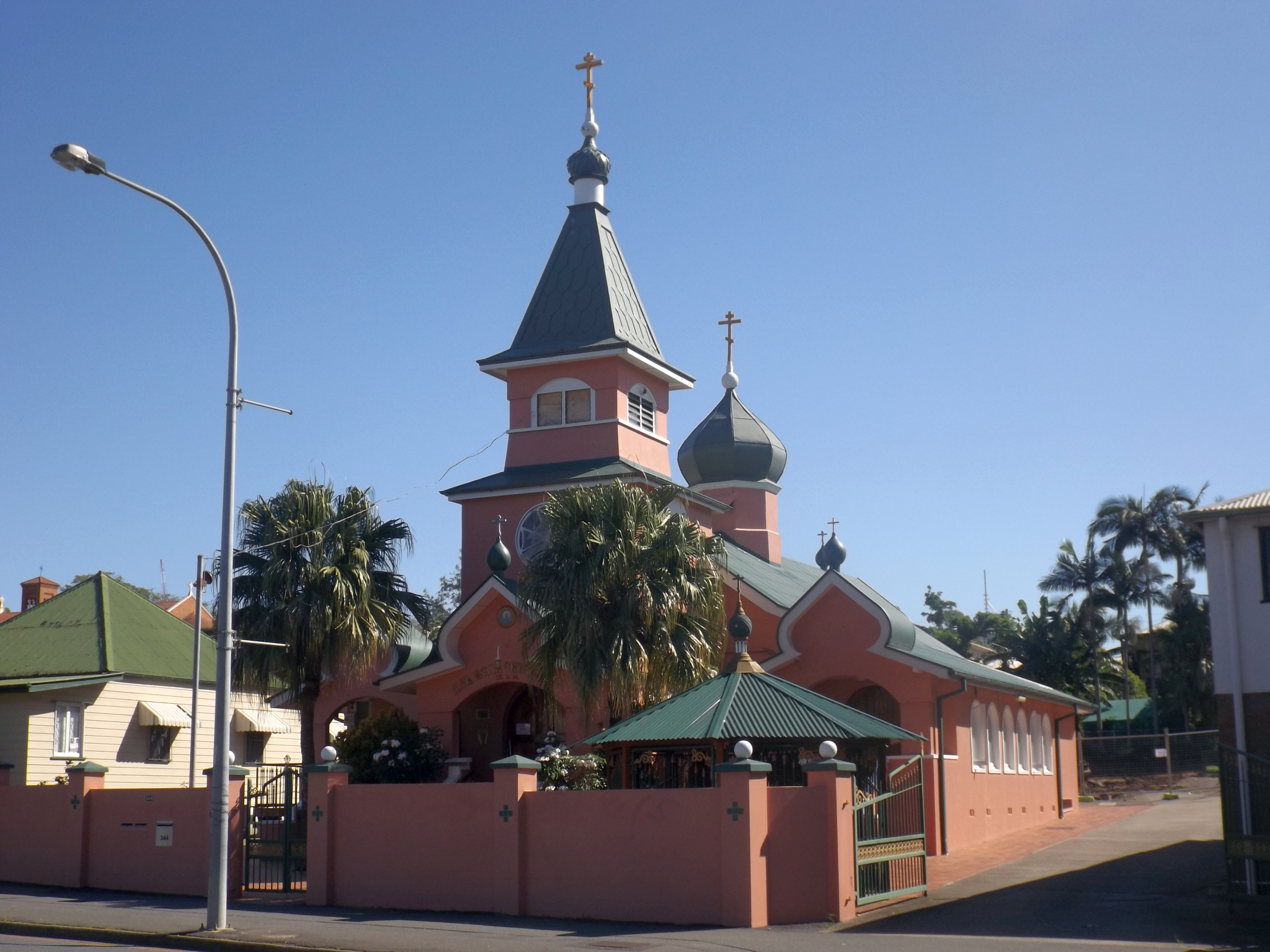
- St Nicholas Cathedral in 2015
- St Nicholas Russian Orthodox Cathedral
- 27.484°S 153.0345°E
- Address: 330–334B Vulture Street, Kangaroo Point, Queensland
- Country: Australia
- Denomination: Russian Orthodox
- Website: stnicholascathedral.org.au

History
- Status: Church (1936–1948); Cathedral (since 1948)
- Dedication: Nicholas II
- Consecrated: 4 October 1936 (as a church) by Greek Orthodox Archbishop Timotheos Evangelinidis; 5 November 1948 (as a cathedral) by Russian Orthodox Bishop Theodore Rafalsky

Architecture
- Architects: Gregory Mechonoshin; Cavanagh and Cavanagh
- Architectural type: Church
- Style: Russian religious
- Years built: 1935–1950s

Specifications
- Materials: Rendered masonry; rendered fibro; corrugated galvanised iron

Administration
- Diocese: Australia and New Zealand

Clergy
- Bishop: vacant (since 1976)
- Rector: Fr Gabriel Makarov

Queensland Heritage Register
- Official name: St Nicholas Russian Orthodox Cathedral
- Type: state heritage (built)
- Designated: 21 October 1992
- Reference no.: 600358
- Significant period: 1935–1950s (fabric); 1925, 1948–1950 (historical)
- Significant components: gate – entrance, trees/plantings, tower – bell / belfry, memorial – wall, furniture/fittings
- Builders: B Robinson

St Nicholas Russian Orthodox Cathedral is a Russian Orthodox cathedral church at 330–334B Vulture Street, Kangaroo Point, Brisbane, Queensland, Australia. The cathedral was designed by Gregory Mechonoshin and Cavanagh and Cavanagh and built from 1935 to 1950s by B. Robinson. The cathedral served as the seat for the Russian Orthodox Diocese of Australia from the time of arrival of the first prelate, Bishop Theodore Rafalsky, in 1948 until 1950, when the Bishop was relocated to Sydney.

The cathedral was added to the Queensland Heritage Register on 21 October 1992.

== History ==
The Russian Orthodox Cathedral of St Nicholas was erected in 1935–1936. It was the first purpose-built Russian Orthodox church in Australia, and one of the earlier parishes established in the post-1917 Russian Diaspora, yet its construction came comparatively late in the history of Russian emigration to Queensland.

A trickle of Russian emigration to Queensland had been sustained through the 19th century, with numbers increasing substantially from the 1880s. These immigrants were popular with the Queensland government, assimilating rapidly. Most moved into rural occupations, and those who remained in Brisbane gained employment principally in the railways, meatworks and factories. By 1911, Russians comprised the fourth largest ethnic group in Brisbane, congregating in South Brisbane–Woolloongabba.

Queensland's largest intake of Russian immigrants took place in the years 1911–1914. Many were radicals and revolutionaries seeking asylum from tsarist political repression in the final chaotic years of the Russian Empire; considerable numbers were Jews escaping state-inspired pogroms. They had fled Russia via Siberia and Northern China, most making their way to Harbin, in Manchuria, then taking passage from the port of Dalian to Townsville or Brisbane, the first Australian ports of call.

Partly because they were scattered throughout the state, and partly because many pre-1920s immigrants associated Russian Orthodoxy with the tsarist system they were fleeing, no formal Russian Orthodox parish was established in Queensland during this period.

Queensland's encouragement of Russian immigration ceased in 1918. During the First World War (1914–1918) Australia was allied with Imperial Russia, and although the Russian Empire collapsed in March 1917, Australia, like most Western nations, supported the provisional government, in an attempt to keep Russia engaged in the war. Following the Bolshevik coup of October 1917 and Russia's withdrawal from the war, however, capitalist nations reversed their Russian policies, regarding the new Soviet regime with hostility. From mid-1918 to 1922, a period of violent civil war in Russia, almost all Russian immigration to Queensland was prohibited.

With large numbers of White émigré Russians (monarchists and anti-communists) fleeing the Soviet Union during this period and applying to emigrate to Australia, the Queensland Government was forced to relax its immigration restrictions. Along with this influx of White Russian emigres to Brisbane in the early 1920s, the city's first Russian Orthodox parish was established. Father Alexander Shabasheff, who had fled Russia via China, arrived in Brisbane in 1923, and through the assistance of Canon David John Garland of the Church of England, obtained the use of St Thomas' Church of England, at the corner of Grey Street and Fish Lane, South Brisbane, where Russian Orthodox immigrants could worship. From this beginning in 1923 a Russian Orthodox parish was created at South Brisbane in 1925, and in 1925–1926 a cottage at 330 Vulture Street, Woolloongabba (site of the present cathedral, now within the suburb boundaries of Kangaroo Point) was purchased by the parish and converted into a church. In 1926, Father Shabasheff was appointed officially to the parish, by the Administration of the Russian Orthodox Church Abroad. In 1930, the parish was registered as St Nicholas Russian Orthodox Church.

Most of the White Russian emigres who arrived in Brisbane in the 1920s had moved immediately to rural areas in search of work. By the mid-1930s, despite the depression, many had made sufficient money to enable them to return to Brisbane, where they were less isolated, and where Russian culture was sustained by the local emigre community. The construction of a purpose-designed Russian Orthodox church became a priority for Brisbane's Russian community. With the appointment in 1933 of Father Valentine Antonieff to the parish of St Nicholas, fund raising for a new church commenced. It was to be erected on the site of the existing church, and would be a memorial to the last Russian tsar, Nicholas II.

Engineer and local parishioner Gregory Mechonoshin drew up a basic plan for the new church. This was approved by the parish council, who then commissioned architects Cavanagh and Cavanagh, of Brisbane and Perth, to prepare formal plans. Tenders were called in mid-1935, and the contract was let to builder B Robinson. Assistance in the technical construction of the cupola was given by another parishioner and engineer, Mr Golovznin. Construction commenced in 1935, and when finished (probably early in 1936), the building was consecrated with lesser rites by the local priest. The first wedding was held in the church in late January 1936. On 4 October 1936, the church was consecrated with full rites by Greek Orthodox Archbishop Timotheos, there being no Russian Orthodox bishop yet appointed in Australia.

The iconostasis (timber screen separating the sanctuary from the nave) and royal gates were constructed and decorated by local Russian immigrants. The movable icons and chandelier are of Russian or Chinese origin, and were donated by the widow of Father Tourchinsky. Interior fittings included a shrine to Tsar Nicholas II. The Maltese Cross on the front tower of the building was incorporated not for liturgical reasons, but because it formed part of the Queensland state emblem.

The front fence, extant by May 1939, was constructed a few years after the new church was erected, replacing an earlier picket fence. The work was financed by Alexander Bardin, who had a cattle property near Roma, as a memorial to his wife and parents. It was constructed by local parishioner Michael Zakrjevsky.

The Diocese of Australia was established in December 1946, with Bishop Theodore (Rafalsky) appointed as its head. At the time there were only two Russian Orthodox parishes in Australia, St Nicholas in Brisbane, established in 1925, and St Vladimir's in Sydney, established in 1938. As St Vladimir's Church was only a converted house, and St Nicholas Church had been purpose-built, Bishop Theodore was to be located in Brisbane. After immigration delays, the bishop finally arrived in Brisbane in late 1948, and consecrated St Nicholas Church at Woolloongabba as Australia's first Russian Orthodox Cathedral, on 5 November 1948. The seat of Russian Orthodoxy in Australia remained in Brisbane only a short time. In 1950, Bishop Theodore was appointed Archbishop of Australia and New Zealand, and relocated to Sydney, which was geographically more central to the diocese, and contained a larger post-Second World War Russian immigrant population than Brisbane. Several vicar bishops occupied the Brisbane bishopric between 1950 and 1976, but the position has remained vacant since.

At some time after 1950, the building was extended at each side.

The Russian Orthodox Cathedral of St Nicholas remains integral to the survival of Russian culture and religion in Brisbane, despite the more recent establishment of two other Russian Orthodox parishes: St Seraphim's at Woolloongabba (1950s) and a church at Rocklea (1960s). Services are conducted in the liturgical language, Church Slavonic, although every two months an English-language service is held as well, and for many years the church has maintained an important library of Russian works. A large part of Russian cultural identity in Brisbane remains bound with the traditions of Russian Orthodoxy and St Nicholas Cathedral.

== Description ==
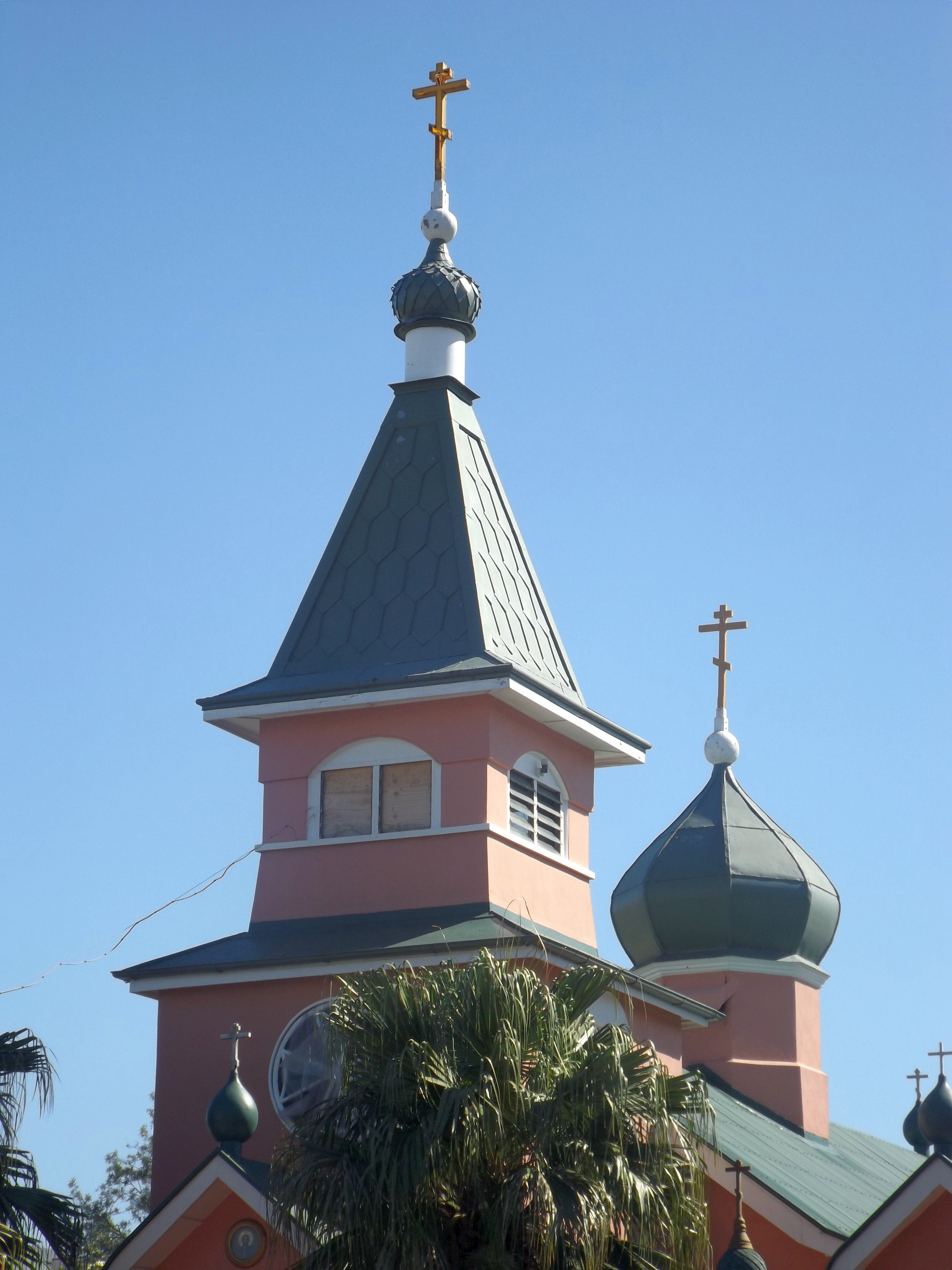
Spire, 2015

St Nicholas Russian Orthodox Cathedral is situated with its main face to Vulture Street, in a setting of tall mature trees.

On the site which rises gently from Vulture Street, and flanked to each side and to the rear by high-set single storey timber buildings of domestic scale, the church building is the central, commanding building in the group. With its white finished walls resembling masonry, symmetrical facade and distinctive towers, the church stands quite tall and contributes significantly to the streetscape in this part of Vulture Street.

In plan, the church is a simple rectangle, with a square attached tower over the front entry and an attached rectangular aisle at each long side.

There are three symmetrically placed entry porches at the front Vulture Street facade, with roof forms and bargeboards shaped to the profile of a cupola and surmounted by ball and cross finials. A three-sided apse is centrally located at the rear.

The square tower houses a choir space directly above the main entry, and a belfry above that, accessed by a series of simple timber ladders.

Above the altar and centrally placed in the main roof is a smaller six-sided tower and cupola.

Constructed on a rendered masonry base, the building is timber framed with a roughcast rendered fibro exterior, save for the western aisle which has been built in rendered masonry subsequent to 1950. The main roof is sheeted in corrugated galvanised iron, and the cupolas and tapering roof to the square tower are made up of flat and curved pieces of galvanised sheeting.

Rendered masonry steps provide access to each of the three front entry doors, which have two leaves in a round-headed opening.

A path runs from the central entry to a metal gate, centrally placed in a rendered masonry fence along the street frontage. This fence comprises pillars with incised crosses and ball finials, between which are masonry panels and steel tube and wire infill panels.

The interior has a wooden floor and a ceiling which follows the line of the rafters, lined with fibro and VJ boards.

In this building the simple geometric forms, crowned with cupolas and punctuated with tall round-headed windows, are an expression of the canon of Russian religious architecture that dates from Byzantium and that has been constructed here in response to local materials, time and place.

== Heritage listing ==
St Nicholas Russian Orthodox Cathedral was listed on the Queensland Heritage Register on 21 October 1992 having satisfied the following criteria.

The place is important in demonstrating the evolution or pattern of Queensland's history.

The Russian Orthodox Cathedral of St Nicholas at Woolloongabba, erected 1935–36, was the first purpose-built Russian Orthodox church in Australia, and was consecrated in 1948 as the first Russian Orthodox cathedral in Australia. From St Nicholas Cathedral, the Russian Orthodox Diocese of Australia and New Zealand was administered from late 1948 to early 1950.

The establishment of St Nicholas Russian Orthodox Church in Brisbane can be contextualised within the wider pattern of Russian emigration following the Bolshevik coup of 1917, and the establishment of the Russian Orthodox Church Abroad, and remains an important link between Queensland and the most significant political upheaval of the 20th century

The place is important in demonstrating the principal characteristics of a particular class of cultural places.

Its simple geometric forms, crowned with cupolas and punctuated with tall round-headed windows, and the interior arrangement of liturgical elements, including the iconostasis and royal gates, are an expression of the canon of Russian religious architecture that dates from Byzantium and that has been constructed here in response to local materials, time and place.

The place is important because of its aesthetic significance.

With its distinctive towers, the church contributes significantly to the streetscape in this part of Vulture Street.

The place has a strong or special association with a particular community or cultural group for social, cultural or spiritual reasons.

St Nicholas Cathedral has had a close association with the maintenance of Russian cultural identity and tradition in both Brisbane and Queensland, and is important in illustrating the pluralism of 20th century Queensland/Brisbane society.
