= Redemptorist Monastery, North Perth =

Church in Perth, Western Australia

Redemptorist Monastery Church
- Redemptorist Monastery
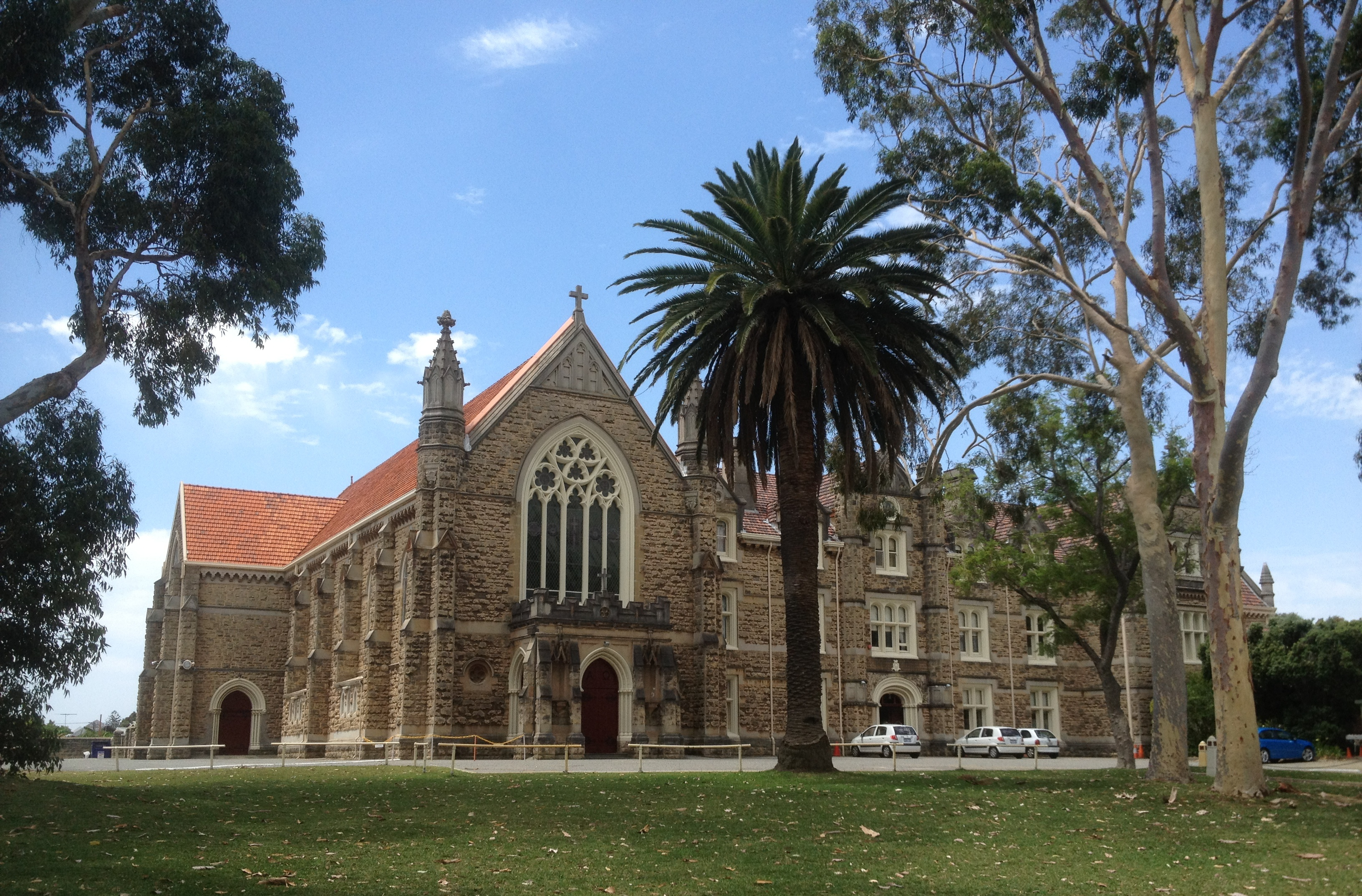
- The Redemptorist Monastery Church
- Redemptorist Monastery Church
- 31°56′09″S 115°51′17″E
- Address: 190 Vincent Street, North Perth, Western Australia
- Country: Australia
- Denomination: Roman Catholic
- Religious order: Congregation of the Most Holy Redeemer
- Website: cssr.org.au/perth/

History
- Status: Church and Monastery
- Dedication: Saint Peter and Saint Paul
- Dedicated: 13 September 1903

Architecture
- Architect: Cavanagh & Cavanagh
- Architectural type: Church
- Style: Federation Gothic
- Years built: c. 1902 – 1922

Specifications
- Materials: Cottesloe Limestone

Administration
- Archdiocese: Perth

Western Australia Heritage Register
- Type: State Registered Place
- Designated: 17 March 2006
- Reference no.: 2218

The Redemptorist Monastery Church in North Perth, Western Australia, is a Roman Catholic church and an adjacent monastery built in 1903 for the Redemptorist Order.

== History ==
The Order was established in Western Australia in 1899 at the instigation of Bishop of Perth Matthew Gibney. The Monastery and Chapel are located on Vincent Street and were designed by Cavanagh & Cavanagh (James and Michael Cavanagh), who also designed the Monastery East Wing additions in 1911/12 and the Chapel sanctuary and transept additions, which were completed in 1922.

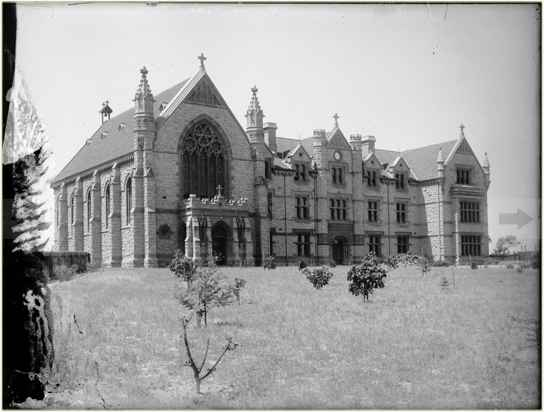
c. 1905

At its opening on 13 September 1903, Bishop Gibney and New Norcia Abbot Fulgentius Torres dedicated the church to Saints Peter and Paul.

The murals in the sanctuary were painted in 1962 by Karl Matzek,an Austrian artist of Czech descent. The adjacent Retreat House was completed in 1967.

The monastery is constructed of Cottesloe Limestone and is in the Federation Gothic style of architecture.
