= Tara House =

Heritage-listed building in Brisbane, Queensland

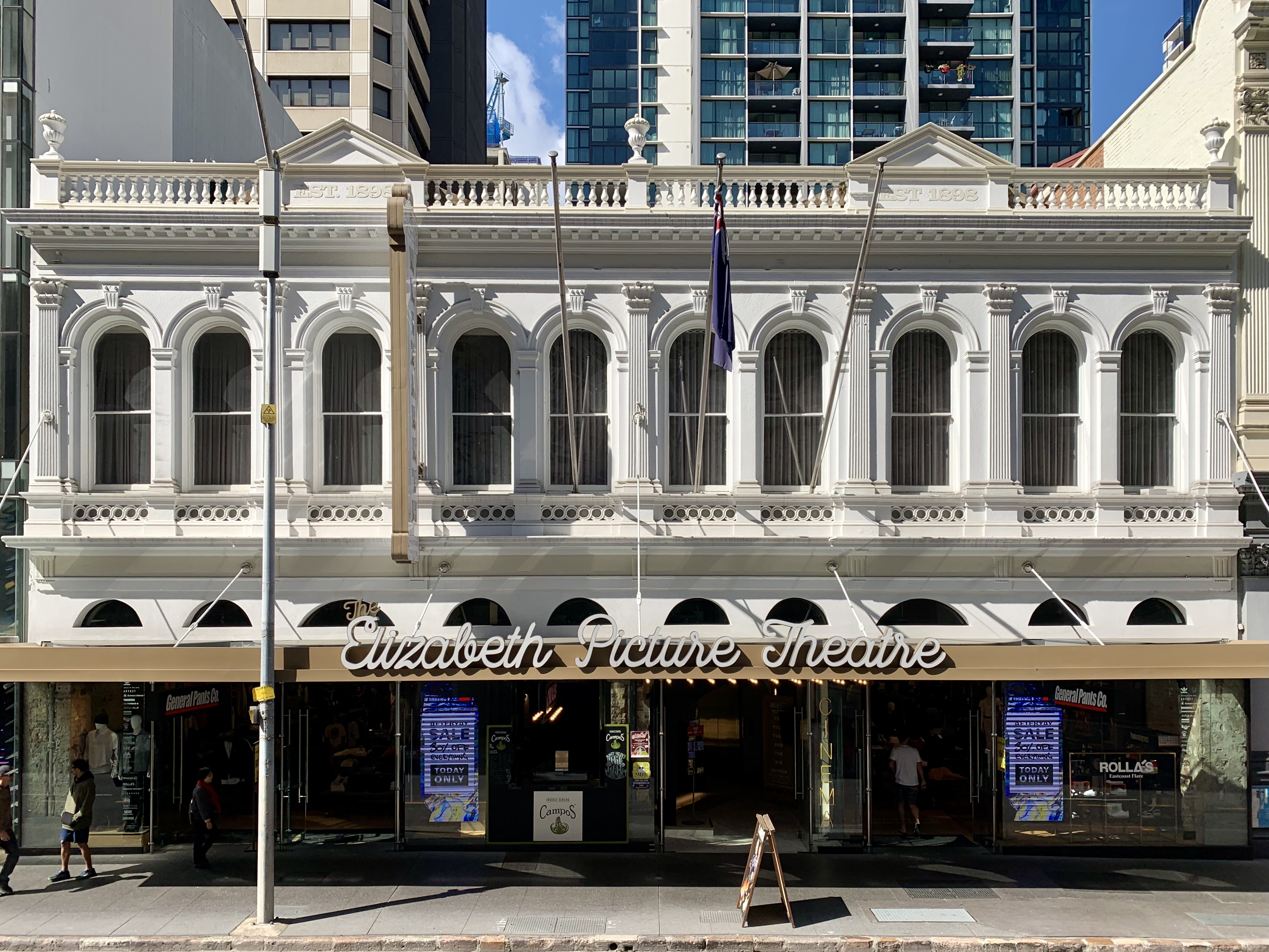
- Tara House (Irish Club), 2019

- Location within Queensland Location within Australia
- 27.4699°S 153.0271°E
- Location: 179 Elizabeth Street, Brisbane City, City of Brisbane, Queensland, Australia

History
- Design period: 1870s–1890s (late 19th century)
- Built: c. 1878–1928
- Built for: James Hunter (bootmaker)

Site notes
- Architect: Richard Gailey
- Architectural style: Classicism
- Owner: James Peter Sourris, Stephen James Sourris and Peter James Sourris

Queensland Heritage Register
- Official name: Tara House (Irish Club)
- Type: state heritage (built)
- Designated: 21 October 1992
- Reference no.: 600105
- Significant period: c. 1878, 1927–1928 (fabric); 1919 (historical)

Tara House is a heritage-listed club house at 179 Elizabeth Street in Brisbane, Queensland, Australia. It was designed by Richard Gailey and built from c. 1878 to 1928. It was also known as the Irish Club, which owned and operated the building from 1919 until its closure in 2015. It was added to the Queensland Heritage Register on 21 October 1992. It has since been converted into a boutique cinema and retains many of its original features, honouring its long history as the Queensland Irish Club. The building is now known as the Elizabeth Picture Theatre.

== History ==
The land at the site was bought by James Hunter, a boot manufacturer, in 1877 for £2250. Soon afterwards, Richard Gailey, architect, called for tenders for the construction of two Elizabeth Street stores for James Hunter. By 1879 Hunter was advertising his warehouses to let at £200 per annum. Hunter's investment in this property was part of a more general, growing interest in this warehousing quarter. Messrs Unmack & Heussler, produce merchants, politicians and prominent citizens, conducted their business at the building from 1879 to 1884. From 1884 to 1899, the building was owned by the wealthy London merchant Alexander McArthur and used as the Brisbane branch of his extensive warehousing firm. The new owner in 1899 was James Cowlishaw, architect, newspaper proprietor, company director and politician. During Cowlishaw's time various importers, warehousing firms and manufacturers agents were tenants. Cowlishaw financed the Queensland Irish Association's (QIA) purchase of the building in 1919 by a mortgage of £8000 (purchase price was £11,000). The building was in the hands of the QIA continuously since that time until 2015 when the QIA went into liquidation and the building was sold to a private investor. The earlier success of the QIA reflects the significance of Queensland's Irish population from the start of free settlement. In the 1860s, 18% of the Queensland population was Irish-born.

Tara House has undergone regular alterations and maintenance to the interior — mostly provision of services and fittings but major structural and interior work was carried out on the building in 1927–1928 — a joint project of the well-known architectural firm Cavanagh and Cavanagh and R Coutts & Son. The internal alterations were designed to highlight the Irish association with the building, an association which continued for almost one hundred years. The building was named Tara House in an official ceremony on 28 June 1948.

In February 2015, the club entered voluntary administration as the club's debt levels continued to rise following a $3 million loan for extensive renovations to attract new younger members. The club continued to operate at Tara House until May 2015 when the club was unable to pay its debts and entered liquidation. In June 2015, Tara House was offered for sale so the Irish Club could pay its creditors. In November 2015 it was sold for $8.1 million to a local private investor. On 16 December 2015 it was announced that the Queensland Irish Association was unable to secure a lease within Tara House due to higher offers being given by commercial operators.

In September 2016, a development application was prepared to convert Tara House into a cinema by James Peter Sourris, Stephen James Sourris and Peter James Sourris, who previously converted the also heritage-listed Village Twin Cinemas in New Farm. The development application was approved in February 2017.

== Description ==
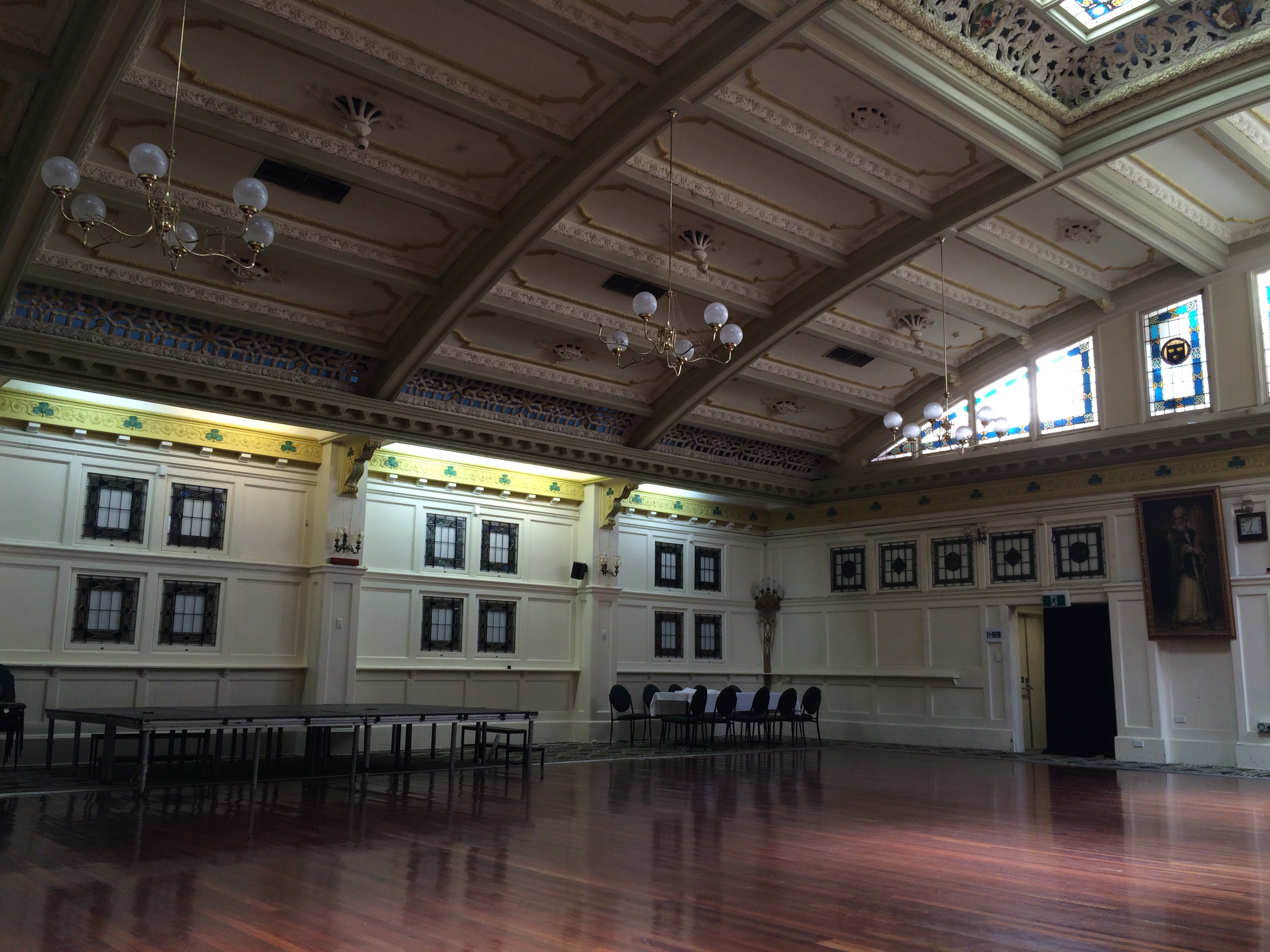
Arched ceiling in the Tara Ball Room, 2015

Tara House is situated in a section of Elizabeth Street previously used as a warehousing precinct. It is located close to other remnants of the warehouse era, notably the adjacent Heckelmanns Building and the present Kings Car Park. Current use of the area is for shops and offices.

Tara House is a two-storey, cement-rendered brick building with basement of the late 1870s, with simple classical detailing, including an arcaded upper level crowned by an entablature and balustraded parapet. The arcade is composed of two symmetrical sections on either side of a central pilaster. Each section contains five semi-circular arched openings, the central one of which is flanked by pilasters and topped, above the parapet, by a triangular pediment. The central pilaster and the pilasters at either end of the facade are each crowned by an urn above the parapet.

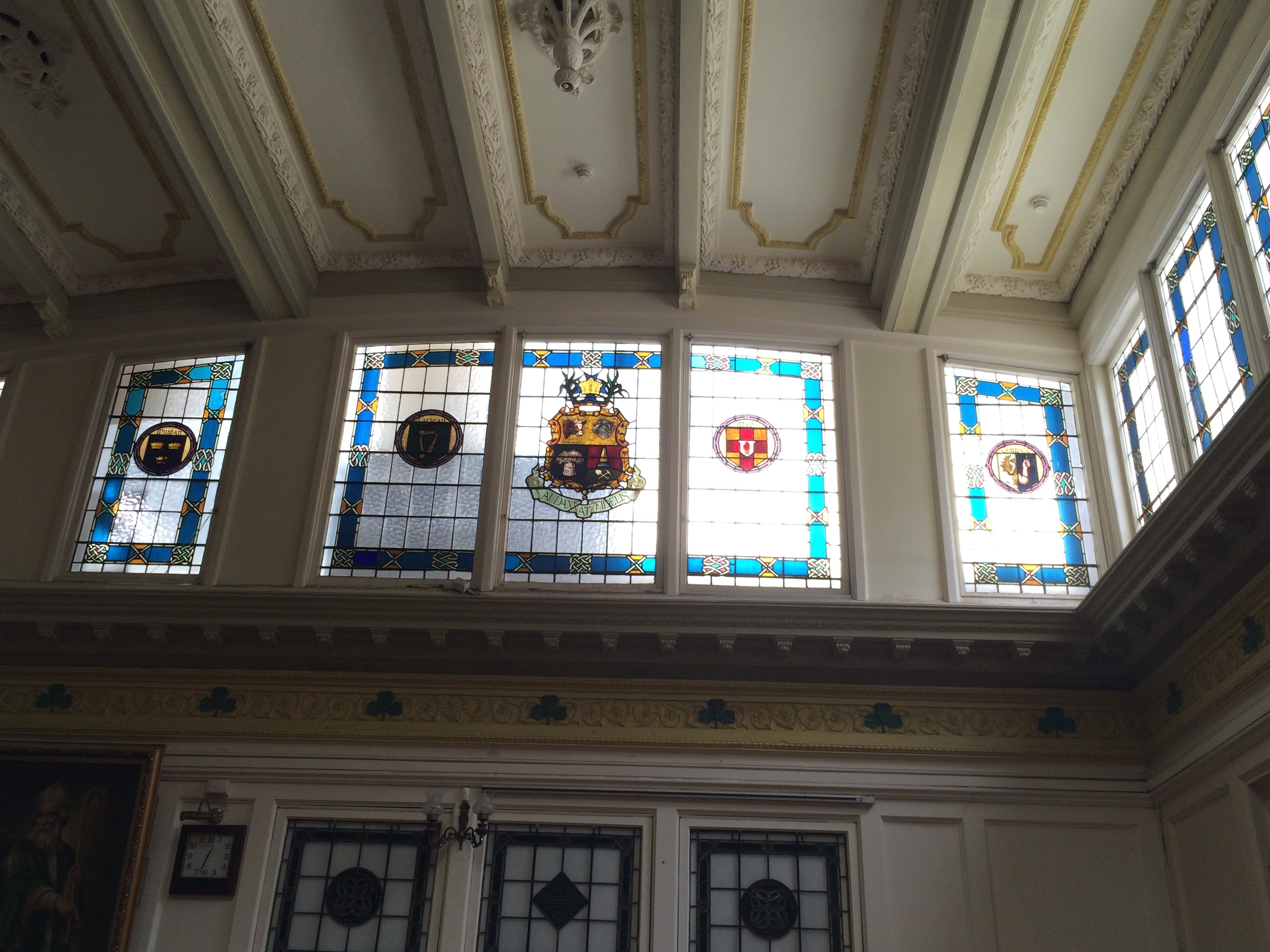
Lead light panels depicting the four provinces of Ireland and the Queensland coat of arms, 2015

Extensive alterations to the building in 1927–28 saw the demolition of the original back wall and the addition of a reinforced concrete and steel extension. At the same time the interior of the first floor was remodelled. A panelled, arched ceiling to the rear half of this floor is decorated in modelled fibrous plaster with angels, harps and Australian floral motifs in gold relief. The walls are panelled in silky oak; the floor is hardwood. Lead light panels in the ceiling and one end wall depict the four provinces of Ireland and the Queensland coat of arms, while other leadlight windows are located in the north- east side wall.

The original ground floor facade and interior finishes have been removed. The upper floor interior finishes of the 1927–28 alterations are intact despite the intrusion of a bar and kitchen and some suspended ceilings. The basement has been extensively refurbished.

== Heritage listing ==
Tara House (Irish Club) was listed on the Queensland Heritage Register on 21 October 1992 having satisfied the following criteria.

The place is important in demonstrating the evolution or pattern of Queensland's history.

Tara House is significant for its architectural quality, in particular the fine design, detailing, materials and workmanship of the interior, which were part of the 1927–28 renovations. Tara House is an example of a facade by Richard Gailey, who designed many city buildings in Brisbane in the 1880s, and is significant for its association with the Irish community in Brisbane and the Queensland Irish Association. It is also significant for its contribution to the streetscape in association with the adjoining Heckelmann's Building.

The place is important because of its aesthetic significance.

Tara House is significant for its architectural quality, in particular the fine design, detailing, materials and workmanship of the interior, which were part of the 1927–28 renovations. Tara House is significant for its contribution to the streetscape in association with the adjoining Heckelmann's Building.

The place has a strong or special association with a particular community or cultural group for social, cultural or spiritual reasons.

Tara House is significant for its association with the Irish community in Brisbane and the Queensland Irish Association.

The place has a special association with the life or work of a particular person, group or organisation of importance in Queensland's history.

Tara House is an example of a facade by Richard Gailey, who designed many city buildings in Brisbane in the 1880s.
