= St Mary's Church, South Brisbane =

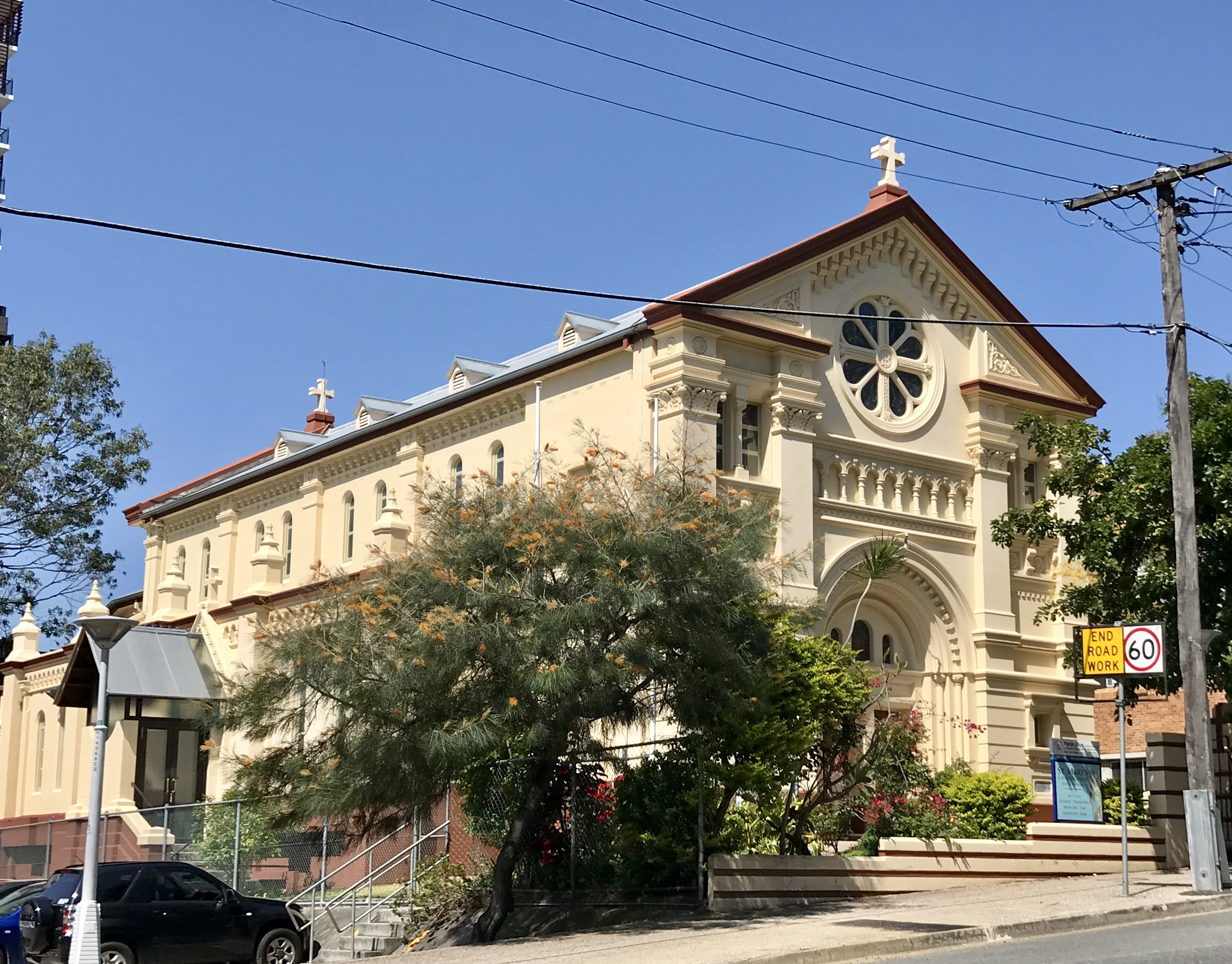
- St Mary's Church in 2018
- St Mary's Church, South Brisbane
- 27°28′26″S 153°00′55″E
- Address: 20 Merivale Street (corner of Peel Street), South Brisbane, Queensland
- Country: Australia
- Denomination: Roman Catholic
- Website: www.southbrisbanestmarys.org.au

History
- Status: Church
- Founded: 25 September 1892
- Founder: Cardinal Patrick Francis Moran
- Dedication: Mary, mother of Jesus
- Dedicated: 2 July 1983 by Archbishop Robert Dunne

Architecture
- Functional status: Active
- Architects: Simkin and Ibler (1890s); Cavanagh and Cavanagh (1920s)
- Architectural type: Church
- Style: Romanesque Revival
- Years built: 1892–1929
- Construction cost: £2,150

Specifications
- Materials: Rendered brick, reinforced concrete

Administration
- Archdiocese: Brisbane
- Parish: St Mary's Catholic Parish, South Brisbane

Queensland Heritage Register
- Official name: St Mary's Catholic Church
- Type: State heritage (built)
- Designated: 3 December 2004
- Reference no.: 602187
- Significant period: 1890s (historical); 1890s, 1920s (fabric)
- Significant components: Stained glass window/s, views to, furniture/fittings, church

St Mary's Church is a heritage-listed Roman Catholic church at 20 Merivale Street (corner of Peel Street), South Brisbane, Queensland, Australia. It was designed by Simkin and Ibler and built from 1892 to 1929. It was added to the Queensland Heritage Register on 3 December 2004.

== History ==
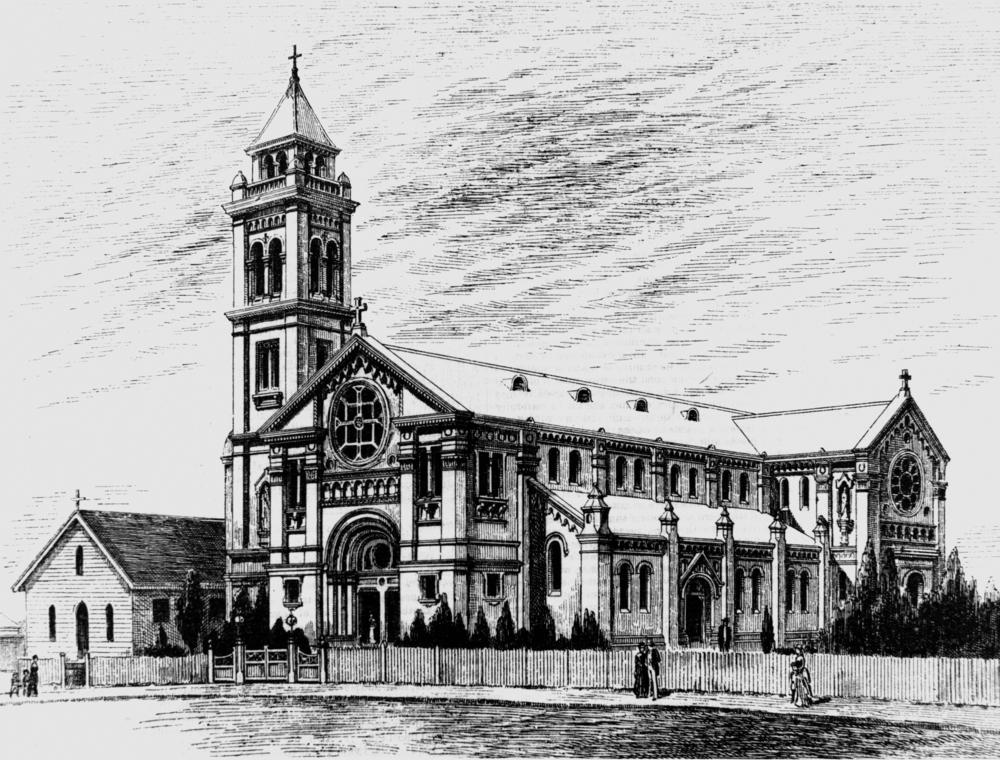
Sketch of the proposed church, which was never completed, 1893

St Mary's Church, South Brisbane, is a late 19th-century rendered brick church designed by Brisbane architects, Simkin and Ibler and constructed by Woollam and Norman in 1892–1893. At the time of its opening on 2 July 1893, construction of the church was not finalised. The proposed tower, transepts and chancel were never built and it was not until 1929 a permanent sanctuary was added to the eastern end of the church to the design of architects Cavanagh and Cavanagh. The former presbytery (now parish house), built at about the same time as the church, was completed by February 1893.

=== Early Catholicism in Brisbane ===
St Mary's was the second Catholic church to be built in South Brisbane and was built adjacent to the first church, a small wooden chapel erected in 1865. The chapel was expanded in 1868 when two aisles were added almost doubling its size. Sparsely inhabited in 1861, the population was only 1,080, South Brisbane was a small but growing residential suburb. By 1871 the number of inhabitants had increased to 4,222.

In the 1880s, Brisbane experienced an economic and building boom and South Brisbane's population trebled, reaching 22,849 in 1891. The connection of the rail network and the development of commercial, industrial and dockside activities on the southern banks of the river further contributed to South Brisbane's growth. The Municipality of South Brisbane was declared in 1888. As residential suburbs expanded the population of the old municipality of Brisbane decreased, by more than 2,000 between 1886 and 1891.

The expansion of the population meant that the chapel was no longer adequate to the needs of the South Brisbane congregation and a meeting was held in August 1889 to discuss the construction of a new and larger church. The Catholic Church had begun acquiring allotments adjoining the original church reserve in 1884 and by 1889 it had amassed considerable land at the northwest end of the block bounded by Cordelia, Peel and Merivale streets. Fund raising for the construction of a new church commenced in 1890 and by the end of 1891 half the cost of the building had been collected. Architects Simkin and Ibler produced drawings of the proposed church. An imposing edifice with Italianate and Romanesque revival details, it was designed to accommodate a congregation of 800 people.

=== Design and construction of the church ===
George Simkin and John Ibler were architects practising in Brisbane in the 1880s who joined in partnership from 1889 to 1894. One of their early projects, the Breakfast Creek Hotel, is a well-known Brisbane landmark. Much of their work together was for the Roman Catholic Church and included important commissions such as Dara, Archbishop Dunne's residence at Petrie Bight, St Stephen's Girls' School in Charlotte Street and a convent for the Sisters of Mercy in Warwick, Our Lady of Assumption Convent, now a private building called the Cloisters. Simkin and Ibler worked in a variety of architectural styles and their designs are noted for an eclectic, sometimes flamboyant, use of ornament. At St Mary's, described at the time of opening as having the Basilica form of plan and an architectural style derived from "a phase of early Italian", ornamental details drawn from a variety of sources are elegantly combined to enliven a traditional plan and arrangement. The style of the church, which combines Romanesque and Renaissance revival elements, was not common at the time as most 19th-century churches were designed in the Gothic Revival style.

Cardinal Patrick Francis Moran laid the foundation stone of the new church on 25 September 1892 at a ceremony attended by the Archbishop of Brisbane, Robert Dunne, the Archbishop of Melbourne Thomas Carr, and other high-ranking clergy. Blessed and opened by Archbishop Dunne on 2 July 1893, St Mary's cost £2,150 to build. Despite the economic crisis and devastating floods of the early 1890s, £1,473 had already been raised for the project and a further £400 was collected at the opening. Due to the limited funds only part of the proposed church was built, the nave and aisles. The concrete rendering was postponed and several parts of the building including the eastern end and the rose window were temporarily constructed from timber. A description of the church as it appeared at its opening, noted the ample provision made for ventilation and the high altar installed in the new church that had previously been used at St Stephen's Cathedral.

The presence of St Mary's in South Brisbane in the 1890s reflects to some extent the character of South Brisbane at the time. The Roman Catholic Church drew much of its membership from the Irish and the proletariat, and it was linked to the labour movement. Though South Brisbane attracted some of Brisbane's elite because of its proximity to the city and elevated home sites, South Brisbane in the 1890s had a reputation as a "workingman's suburb". Most of the names on St Mary's baptism register at the turn of the century were Irish.

=== Subsequent developments ===
From 1866 the original chapel had been a dual-purpose building also functioning as a school. After the opening of the new church it continued to be used as a school until 1909 when substantial new school buildings were built on the southwest portion of the site. The chapel then served as the infant's school until 1926 when extensions to the school incorporated rooms for infants. A substantial bell housed in a timber belfry was erected in 1914 adjacent to the church and in 1915 a convent for the Sisters of Mercy was constructed, diagonally opposite the school on the corner of Cordelia and Peel streets.

The most significant change to the church since its construction in 1893 was the completion of the sanctuary, including vestry and sacristy, in December 1929. Designed by Cavanagh and Cavanagh Architects in a similar manner to the original building, the sanctuary was constructed of reinforced concrete and brick by B. Robinson. The third Archbishop of Brisbane, James Duhig, officially opened the additions. The interior of the chancel with its marble wall linings and altar rails, terrazzo floors, domed plaster ceiling and stained glass windows was more ornate than the rest of the church. A new marble altar by sculptor and monumental mason, Frank Williams of Ipswich, who carried out all the marble work, was installed. The original chapel, no longer required for school purposes, was demolished at this time.

In 1938, the presbytery was completely renovated. F. Chamberlain of Toowoomba was appointed as architect. The renovations were blessed by the Rev. J. English. The appearance of the building must have been altered quite dramatically. The archbishop expressed amazement at the alteration and the current building bears little resemblance to the original. The original gabled roof appears to have been altered to a hipped roof.

With the influx of Catholic immigrants into the area after World War II, St Mary's became an important gathering place for a number of ethnic groups. Prior to the war the Lebanese community had used the church for Mass, which was said by their own priest, until their church in Ernest Street was constructed. A variety of Catholic communities, which lived initially in South Brisbane after emigrating, were invited to use the church. Italian, Dutch, Polish, Lithuanian and Slovenian people attended St Mary's for services conducted by their own priests. The Dutch Men's Choir performed at the church during the 1950s and 1960s. As late as 1993, the Lithuanian and Slovenian communities regularly met at the church. The Lithuanians conducted a regular Sunday Mass. The Slovenians, whose priest lived in Sydney, used the church less frequently. A plaque in Lithuanian is mounted on a wall at St Mary's.

The school closed in 1964 and the school, convent and belfry have since been demolished. The St Vincent de Paul centre now occupies the site of the school. Of the original complex of buildings at St Mary's only the church and presbytery, which has been substantially altered, remain. The former presbytery is not considered to be of cultural heritage significance.

=== Parish controversy ===
In 2008, the church was the subject of controversy when the Roman Catholic Archbishop of Brisbane, John Bathersby, removed the church's long-serving priest, Peter Kennedy, following complaints that he was not observing standard Roman Catholic teachings and practices. Many of his parishioners left the church with him to continue holding services as St Mary's Community in Exile at the Trades and Labour Council building on Peel Street (200 metres (660 ft) away).

== Description ==
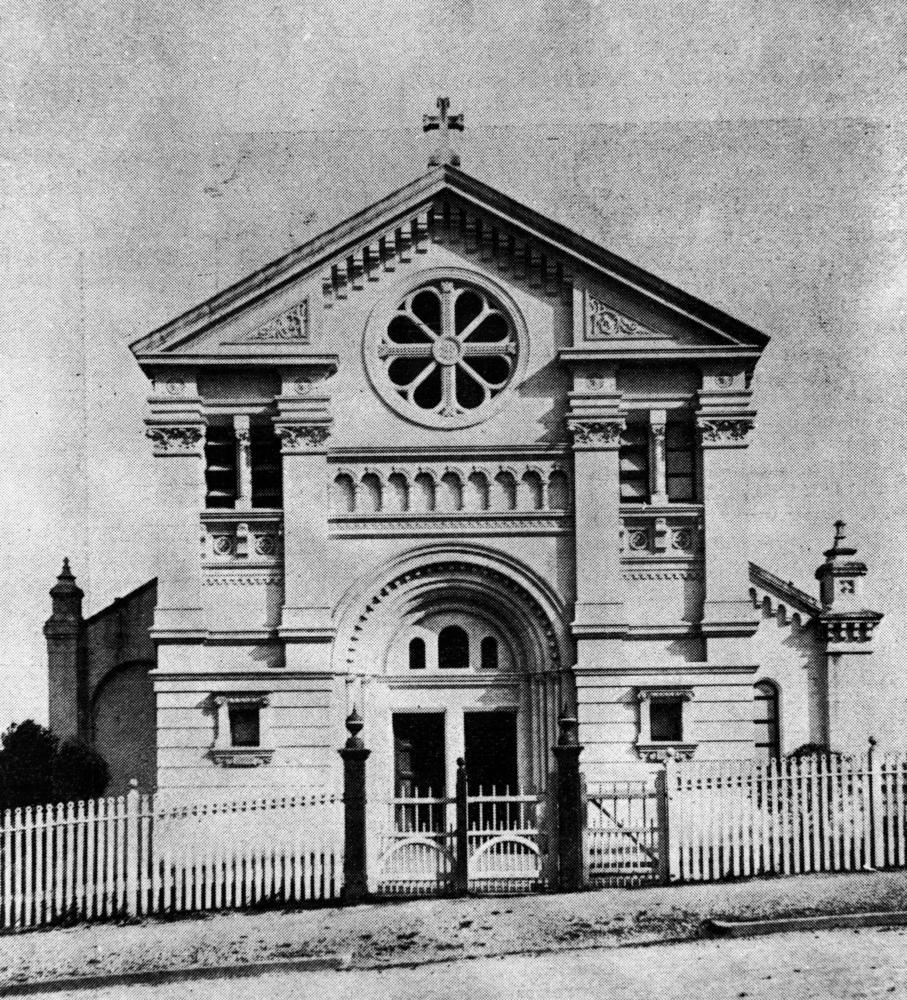
St Mary's Catholic Church at South Brisbane, 1900

St Mary's Catholic Church is situated on a large corner block at the intersection of Merivale and Peel Streets in a light industrial and commercial area of the inner Brisbane suburb of South Brisbane. An imposing rendered masonry building with corrugated iron roofs the church is located on the highest part of the site near the western corner. The front of the church faces northwest onto Peel Street. Formerly occupied by an earlier church, the northern portion of the site adjacent to the church and closest to the street intersection is now a car park with some landscaping. In the eastern part of the site facing onto Merivale Street is the former presbytery, a timber building on stumps with corrugated iron hip roofs. The former presbytery is not considered to be of cultural heritage significance.

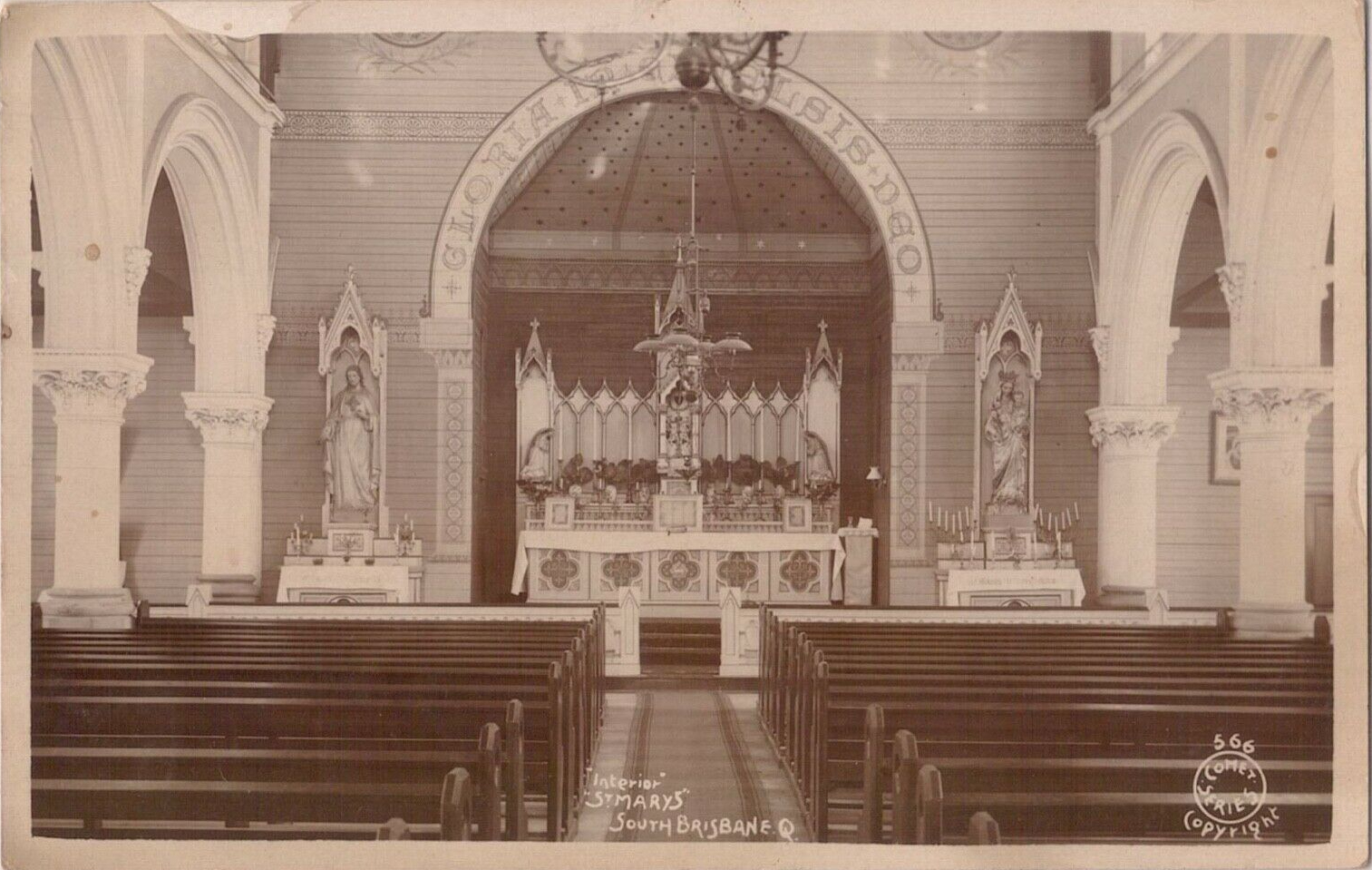
Interior of St Mary's

St Mary's Catholic Church consists of a wide high central space or nave, narrower aisles on each side of the nave, and a semicircular chancel. A proposed bell tower and transepts were never built. The nave, a double height space with a clerestory, projects forward of the single storey side aisles to form the main facade or liturgical west front of the church. Terminating the longitudinal axis of the nave at the liturgical eastern end is the projecting semicircular chancel. Small rooms, the sacristy and vestry, flank the chancel on the north and south. The nave is roofed by a simple timber framed gable roof with gabled ventilators and the aisles by lean-to roofs. The chancel, sacristy and vestry, all additions at the rear of the church, have smaller separate roofs that are largely concealed by parapet walls. The arrangement and form of the church is based on the traditional model of the basilica, originally a type of Roman public building that early Christians adapted for worship.

Described at the time of its completion as being built in a style of architecture based on early Italian, the church has a form and architectural features that are associated with the Romanesque revival but includes a variety of details drawn from other styles. The most characteristic feature of Romanesque architecture is the use of the round arch. Other distinguishing motifs that are used at St Mary's include the wheel or rose window, a frieze that contains a blind arcade, string courses and a type of arched corbel motif known as mock machicolation.

The liturgical west front of the church, which actually faces northwest, is simple in form but richly embellished with architectural detail. A two-storey structure, taller than it is wide, the symmetrical west front is divided into three bays and surmounted by a parapeted gable in the form of a broken bed pediment. The central bay of the facade contains the main entrance to the church, an imposing arched opening with a shafted jamb framing a recessed doorway. Over the timber panelled doors is a semicircular tympanum containing three arched windows and above the tympanum, a blind arcade of colonettes (thin columns). The main feature of the gable is a wheel window centred in the gap created by the broken base of the pediment. Raked corbelling over the wheel window supports the projecting edge of the pediment. A cross is situated at the pinnacle of the pediment and at the other end of the ridge of the nave roof.

The bays on either side of the entrance bay consist of pairs of pilasters on a banded base that appear to support the pediment. Between each set of pilasters are two narrow rectangular windows separated by a half or engaged column. A small square window centred in the base of each bay has unusual moulded surrounds including jambs terminated by a stylised volute and a coved cornice with a leaf pattern. Other facade details include rosettes, dogtooth banding, acanthus leaf capitals to pilasters and arabesque ornamentation on the pediment.

The northeast and southwest side elevations are similar. The aisles consist of four bays delineated by engaged piers with an ornamental top. Tall narrow windows with round arched tops are arranged in pairs in each bay with the exception of the bay second from the front that contains the side entrance doors. Each side entrance is an arched opening further emphasised by a shallow decorative gable. Masonry stairs lead up to the entrance into the north aisle while the south aisle is level with the ground outside. The main decorative detail on the side elevations is a double-layered arched corbel table running along the top of the aisle walls between the engaged piers. Above the roof of the aisles the clerestory portion of the nave wall is visible. The wall treatment is similar to the aisle walls including engaged piers and the same pairs of arched windows. The walls are blank at the northern corner of the building where the bell tower was originally proposed.

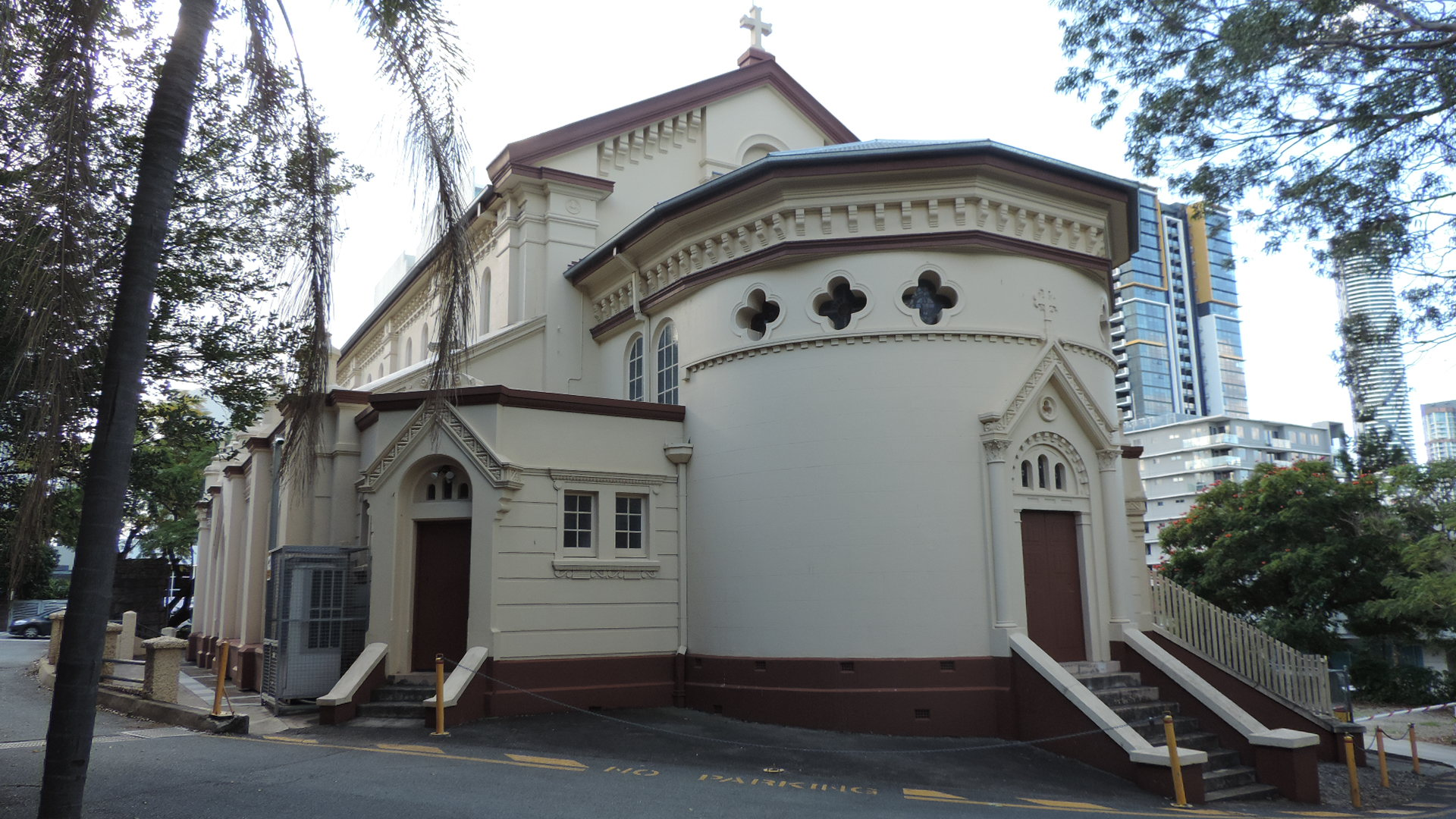
Rear of the church, 2020

The chancel, sacristy and vestry, additions to the rear of church were built using similar materials and details to the original part of the building. Three sets of external masonry stairs lead to timber entrance doors that open directly into each of these three spaces, the stairs on the eastern corner being the tallest due to the slope in the land. The curved walls of the chancel are distinguished by a high row of quatrefoil stained glass windows. All of the entries into the church are marked with a cross, situated at the apex of the roof over. The interior of the church, well lit by natural daylight, has rendered white painted walls, dark stained timber ceilings and choir mezzanine and a concrete floor. The main entrance to the church, located under the mezzanine, has a low raked plaster ceiling. A decorative timber canopy and posts further differentiates the entrance. Quarter-turn timber stairs with winders in the northern corner of the west front lead up to the stepped choir platform, a balcony-like space housing the organ and overlooking the nave.

A colonnade of four round arches supported by stumpy columns on tall pedestals runs along the north and south edges of the nave separating it from the aisles. Above the colonnade is the clerestory with arched windows that let light directly into the double height space of the nave. The ceiling of the nave is lined on the rake and exposed timber trusses, a variant of a queen post truss with arched braces, span across the nave.

The skillion-roofed aisles also have raked clear finished timber boarded ceilings supported by exposed timber trusses. Narrow round arched windows illuminate the aisles and a set of timber doors with fanlight over open to the exterior. Shrines dedicated to Jesus and Mary are located at the southeast ends of the aisles.

The sanctuary is located at the eastern end of the nave. A chancel arch flanked by decorative niches separates the chancel from the nave. A change in floor finish and level defined by a marble altar rail also mark the sanctuary as a different kind of space. The chancel, roofed by a dome, is more richly finished than the rest of the church. It has a mosaic tiled and marble floor, quatrefoil stained glass windows over pilasters surmounted by arches in low relief. The lower part of the curved chancel walls are lined in marble panelling. Located in the centre of the space under the dome is the high altar, an elaborate gothic structure in various coloured marbles. Small rooms located on either side of the chancel are the vestry and sacristy. The room on the southern corner retains built in timber wardrobes and cupboards.

Externally the church is surrounded by hard paved surfaces except for lawns near the main entrance and gardens on the northeast side of the church. The original front fence and gates have been replaced but masonry piers on either side of the gates remain. A stone grotto is situated to the west of the main entrance.

The former presbytery, now known as the Parish House, and various sheds and utility buildings at the rear of the church are not of cultural heritage significance. The St Vincent de Paul Centre, to the southwest of the church on the neighbouring block, is not included in the listing.

== Heritage listing ==
St Mary's Catholic Church was listed on the Queensland Heritage Register on 3 December 2004 having satisfied the following criteria.

The place is important in demonstrating the evolution or pattern of Queensland's history.

St Mary's Catholic Church demonstrates the pattern of development in Brisbane that resulted from the economic boom of the 1880s, in particular the development of South Brisbane at a time when rapid expansion of riverside industry and the adjoining residential suburb created the need for more substantial buildings to service an increased population. Surviving evidence of South Brisbane's former character as a predominantly working class suburb, the church reflects the Irish and proletariat origins of the congregation. Built without the proposed belltower and transepts and not completed at its opening, the church also shows the impact of economic hardships experienced in the 1890s.

The place demonstrates rare, uncommon or endangered aspects of Queensland's cultural heritage.

Most 19th century churches were built in the Gothic Revival style. St Mary's is an early example of a church built in a style derived from Italian Romanesque and Renaissance architecture. Modelled on the basilica, St Mary's was designed in an eclectic manner typical of late 19th century architecture but in a style that was then unusual for churches in Queensland.

The place is important in demonstrating the principal characteristics of a particular class of cultural places.

An excellent example of a substantial late 19th century masonry church, St Mary's demonstrates the principal characteristics of second or permanent churches that were built in established parishes to replace earlier temporary and often dual-purpose structures.

The place is important because of its aesthetic significance.

St Mary's is an important landmark in Peel Street. Simple in overall form and finishes, the church is elegantly detailed with a spacious well-lit interior.

The place has a strong or special association with a particular community or cultural group for social, cultural or spiritual reasons.

The site of the first Catholic church built in South Brisbane in 1865 and used continuously for both worship and Catholic social services ever since, the place has a strong association with the Roman Catholic Church of Queensland. In particular St Mary's has a special association with the migrant Catholic communities that developed in South Brisbane after the Second World War.

== In popular culture ==
In 2011, a feature documentary has been made about Kennedy and the exiled community and their conflict with the Catholic Church, entitled The Trouble with St Mary's.

In 2016, the play St Mary's in Exile was written by David Burton about the events that led to the removal of Father Peter Kennedy as parish priest. It was performed in August–September 2016 as part of the Brisbane Festival at the Queensland Theatre Company's Bille Brown Theatre, approximately 250 metres (820 ft) from St Mary's.
