= St Patrick's Church, Gympie =

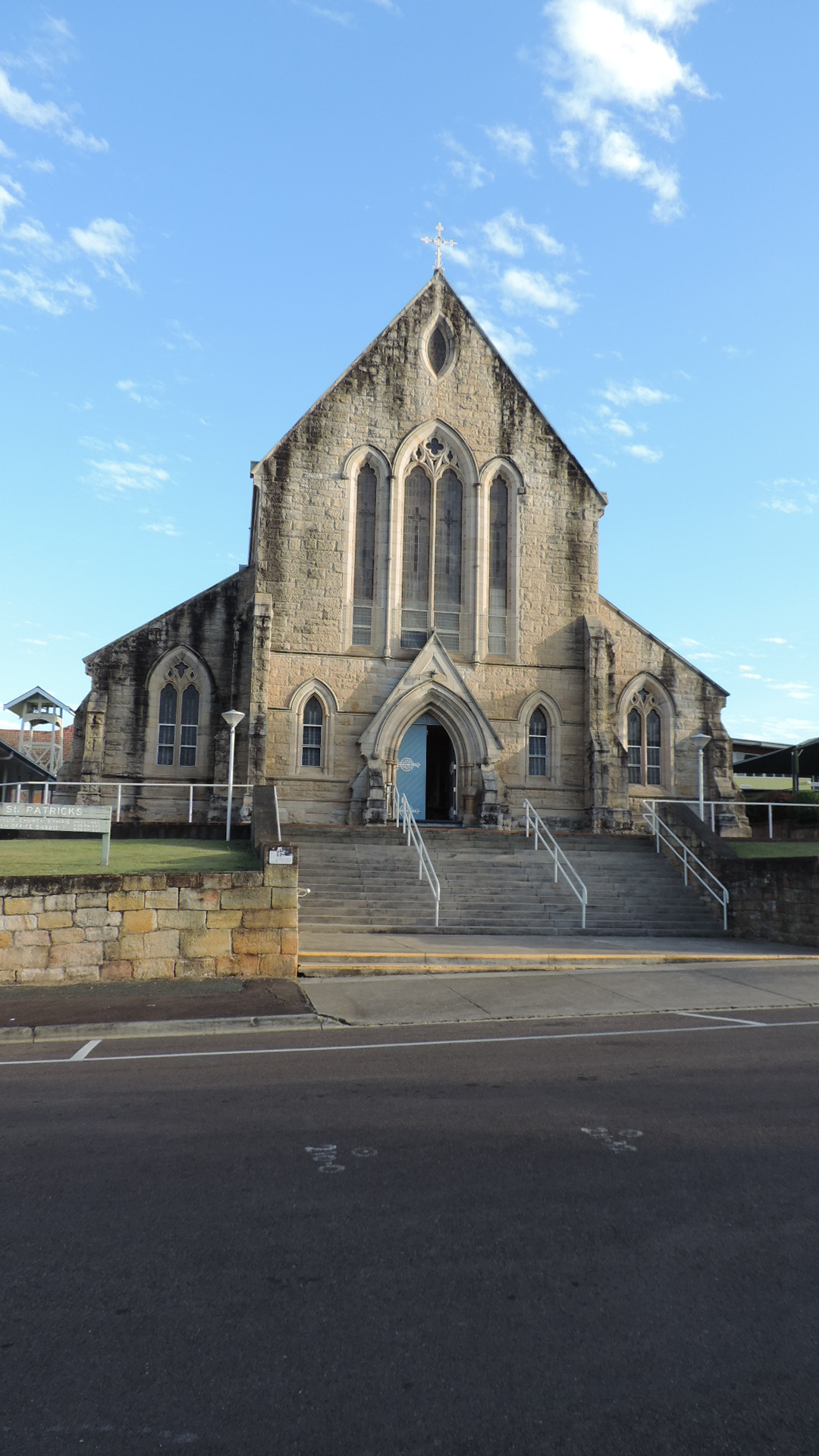
- St Patrick's Roman Catholic Church, 2015
- St Patrick's Church, Gympie
- 26°11′33″S 152°39′57″E
- Address: Church Street, Gympie, Gympie Region, Queensland
- Country: Australia
- Denomination: Roman Catholic
- Website: stpatsgympie.net.au

History
- Status: Church
- Founded: 28 January 1883
- Founder: Bishop Robert Dunne
- Dedication: Saint Patrick
- Consecrated: 17 July 1887 by Archbishop Robert Dunne

Architecture
- Architect: Francis Drummond Greville Stanley
- Architectural type: Church
- Style: Gothic Revival
- Years built: 1883–1935
- Construction cost: c. A£10,000

Specifications
- Materials: Sandstone; timber; terracotta tiles

Administration
- Archdiocese: Brisbane
- Parish: St Patrick's Parish, Gympie

Clergy
- Priest: Very Rev Dr Adrian Farrelly

Queensland Heritage Register
- Official name: St Patrick's Church
- Type: State heritage (landscape, built)
- Designated: 20 February 1995
- Reference no.: 601503
- Significant period: 1880s (historical); 1880s, 1920s, 1930s (fabric) ongoing (social)
- Significant components: Furniture/fittings, tower – bell / belfry, church, views to, stained glass window/s, garden/grounds
- Builders: J Smith and Co, Peter and George Duckworth

St Patrick's Church is a heritage-listed Roman Catholic church at Church Street, Gympie, Gympie Region, Queensland, Australia. It was designed by Francis Drummond Greville Stanley and built from 1883 to 1935. It was added to the Queensland Heritage Register on 20 February 1995.

== History ==
St Patrick's Church was constructed on Calton Hill in Gympie from 1883 to 1887, by the Roman Catholic Church. It was the third permanent church constructed in the town for the Catholic community on or near this site. The building was designed by the prominent Brisbane architect, FDG Stanley.

The first Catholic mass was celebrated in Gympie in February 1868, in the Brisbane Hotel, by Father Tissot. The following month, Father Matthew Horan arrived on the newly established goldfields and assumed his position as parish priest, which he held until his death in 1923. Upon his arrival, Father Horan pitched a tent on Calton Hill to celebrate mass, beginning the long Catholic domination of the site. Tenders appeared in the Nashville Times on 18 March 1868, for the construction of a permanent church building. This timber building was ready for use by the end of 1868, but lasted only four years due to the damaging effects of weathering and white ants. Some of the land at Calton Hill was donated to the church by local residents including Patrick Lillis, and other land was bought at auction.

In 1872 a second church was constructed of hardwood, and opened by Rev Dr James O'Quinn, Bishop of Queensland. Despite the later addition of side aisles, the hardwood church was regarded as inadequate for the growing Catholic congregation and another building was planned reflecting the importance of the church in the community. In 1879 a Catholic school was established on land nearby, when the Sisters of Mercy arrived in Gympie. Plans for the new church were prepared by well known Brisbane architect, FDG Stanley, and a local builder William Streeton and presented to the newly appointed Bishop Robert Dunne in 1881. Plans shown to the bishop were prepared for both a stone and brick church costing £3800 and £3000 respectively, and from these Dunne decided to proceed with a stone church.

Bishop Dunne officiated at a ceremony, on 28 January 1883, to lay the foundation stone at St Patrick's. Subscription lists were opened for the funding of the construction and donations by the end of the day totalled £1200. On 19 September 1883 the tender of J Smith and Co was accepted to supply the material and build the church for a sum of £3591. Construction of St Patrick's took place over the next four years, firstly by the original contractors, then by Messrs Peter and George Duckworth. At about the time of this changeover the southern wall of the church collapsed in a strong wind. The joinery and seating was undertaken by local carpenter, William Condon. An organ worth £500 and a marble altar also worth £500 which was donated by Mr James Fitzpatrick, a successful mining pioneer in the area, were features of the new building.

On 17 July 1887 St Patrick's Church was opened by Rev. Robert Dunne who had become the first Archbishop of Queensland. The church was built at a final cost of around A£10,000. At the opening, St Patrick's Church, which was built to accommodate 950, was crowded with 1400 people who paid to attend the service. The church was described as a landmark for many miles around due to its elevated position, its great height, its pure white stone walls and its well-cut lines. St Patrick's was rectangular in plan, though was designed to accommodate the later addition of transepts. It was originally built with corrugated iron roof sheeting with small ventilation gablets lining the roof. When St Patrick's opened, other churches in Gympie included a timber Presbyterian church on Red Hill, a timber Wesleyan Methodist Church on Surface Hill which was replaced in the 1890s by a large brick church, and a small Church of England on Palatine Hill, also replaced by a large brick church in 1888.

St Patrick's Church continued to grow under the care of Father Horan; an organ gallery, designed by Hugo Durietz was added in 1896. Upon Horan's death on 6 July 1923, Dean Michael O'Flynn became the new parish priest. O'Flynn immediately began arrangements for the completion of the east end of the church. Brisbane architects, Cavanagh and Cavanagh, were commissioned to design the completion of the southern end, parts of which had been stopped with metal sheeting until this time. The extension included a polygonal chancel and flanking this, two smaller polygonal rooms used as the vestry and the sanctuary. The tender of Mr Brittam, for an amount of £1790 was accepted by 8 September 1924 and the work was finished in 1925. The following year work was completed on the adjacent brick presbytery, which replaced an earlier timber building.

On 14 April 1929 Archbishop James Duhig dedicated newly installed stained glass windows placed where in the gables where the transepts were to have been extended. These windows were dedicated to the remembrance of the Catholic Emancipation and in particular to a key figure in the struggle, Daniel O'Connell. Duhig also laid the foundation stone for the new convent, commemorating the centenary of the Sisters of Mercy and the Jubilee of their arrival in Gympie.

Father O'Flynn remained at St Patrick's until his death in 1935, when he was replaced by Monsignor Timothy Malony. Malony undertook vast improvements to the grounds, including paving and lawns around the church, and the construction of broad steps to the church. In 1951, the new parish priest Monsignor David Dee, concerned with the lack of accommodation at St Patrick's, established a new Catholic church in northern Gympie, diminishing the large congregation.

== Description ==
St Patrick's Roman Catholic Church is a substantial sandstone building on Calton Hill, a prominent site in Gympie. It is surrounded by concrete paving, and established lawns and gardens. There is a timber-framed bell tower on the lawns to the east of the church.

The church has a rectangular plan, featuring a clerestoried five bay nave and side aisles, with an additional unextended transept bay. The church features a polygonal chancel and two smaller polygonal rooms on the southern end used as a vestry and a sanctuary.

The building is constructed of rock-faced sandstone laid in courses of random sized blocks, with elements such as quoining, continuous moulding beneath the gutter, plinth course and string courses chiselled smooth. The building has a plinth of larger rock-faced sandstone blocks. The angle buttressing is sandstone with wide chiselled edges. The southern end of the church, including the transept gables, diagonal buttressing, chancel, vestry and sanctuary is constructed of bricks with an inscribed render, imitating ashlar stonework. Generally the church has pointed arch windows with geometric stone tracery.

The steeply pitched gabled roof has Marseilles pattern interlocking terracotta tiles, with matching ridge capping. Gables are found on the southern end of the east and west walls, where transepts were to begin. Featured on each of the gables is a large pointed arch stained glass window, integrating many smaller lights with geometric tracery.

The western wall features a portal entrance framed by a ribbed pointed archway. Pointed arch windows flank the portal and feature hood mouldings, which are integrated with a string course. Above the entrance is a large three arched window, incorporating four lancet lights and geometric tracery. At the highest point of the gable is a small inverted eyelet window. Pointed arch windows are found on the southern and northern walls, defining the internal bays. The clerestory windows use the quatrefoil motif, to frame brightly coloured stained glass in simple geometric patterns.

Internally, round sandstone piers supporting pointed arches, form arcades which define the nave and aisles of the church. Slender engaged columns extend upward from the piers to support a variation of hammer-beam timber roof trusses, strengthened with brackets of decorative joinery. The ceiling is diagonally boarded, tongue and groove, v-jointed timber.

A pointed chancel arch, opens onto the chancel which has a faceted dome ceiling, which is painted with religious scenes. The chancel features a marble altar, accessed via two marble stairs, and a small stained glass rose window of the Holy Family.

The organ gallery at the west end of the church is supported on slender round columns with prominent stylised Doric capitals. The organ is inscribed with Richard Heslop 16 Burma Rd London. Timber-framed Stations of the Cross line the walls of the side aisles. Many of the stained glass windows bear plaques with details of the person who donated them.

== Heritage listing ==
St Patrick's Roman Catholic Church was listed on the Queensland Heritage Register on 20 February 1995 having satisfied the following criteria.

The place is important in demonstrating the evolution or pattern of Queensland's history.

St Patrick's Church, erected 1883–87, is a substantial sandstone building which is important in demonstrating the rapid growth of Gympie in the 1880s, as a result of the prosperity of the gold fields.

The place is important in demonstrating the principal characteristics of a particular class of cultural places.

St Patricks is a good example of church architecture practiced in the 1880s, influenced by Gothic revival styles and of the ecclesiastical work of the prominent Queensland architect, FDG Stanley. It has a number of elements demonstrating high quality craftsmanship including the marble altar, the organ, joinery, stone masonry and stained glass windows.

The place is important because of its aesthetic significance.

St Patricks is a good example of church architecture practiced in the 1880s, influenced by Gothic revival styles and of the ecclesiastical work of the prominent Queensland architect, FDG Stanley. It has a number of elements demonstrating high quality craftsmanship including the marble altar, the organ, joinery, stone masonry and stained glass windows.

The church has been an outstanding landmark in Gympie since its opening in 1887, as a large imposing building constructed on a prominent site. It was the first substantial masonry church in Gympie and served as the model for subsequent churches in the town.

The place has a strong or special association with a particular community or cultural group for social, cultural or spiritual reasons.

The church demonstrates the spread of the Catholic Church in regional Queensland. It has a long association with the Catholic community in Gympie and reflects the development of Catholicism in the area.
