= Hibernian Hall, Roma =

Australian community hall

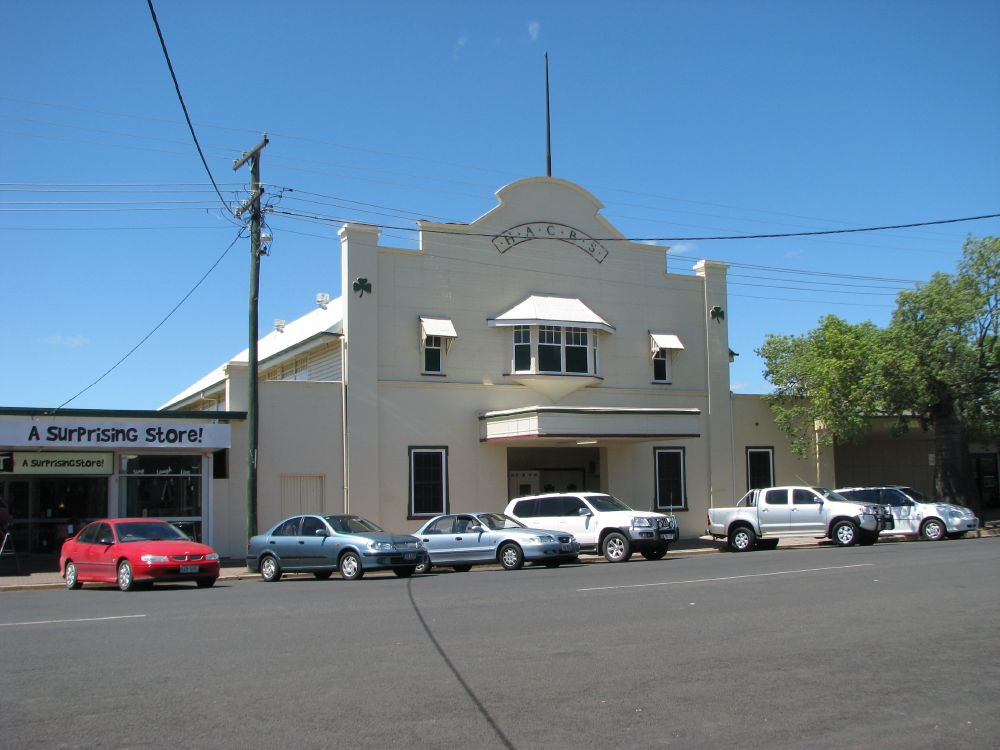
- Hibernian Hall, 2010

- Location within Queensland Location within Australia
- 26.5726°S 148.7885°E
- Location: 38–44 Hawthorne Street, Roma, Maranoa Region, Queensland, Australia

History
- Design period: 1919–1930s (interwar period)
- Built: 1931–1932

Site notes
- Architect: Cavanagh & Cavanagh

Queensland Heritage Register
- Official name: Hibernian Hall, HACBS Hall
- Type: state heritage (built)
- Designated: 27 April 2001
- Reference no.: 601689
- Significant period: 1931–1932 (fabric); 1932–1976 (historical); 1932–ongoing (social)
- Significant components: stage/sound shell, proscenium arch, ticket box/office, foyer – entrance, dance floor, projection booth/bio box, dining room, canteen, auditorium
- Builders: George Power Williams

Hibernian Hall is a heritage-listed community hall at 38–44 Hawthorne Street, Roma, Maranoa Region, Queensland, Australia. It was designed by Cavanagh & Cavanagh and built from 1931 to 1932 by George Power Williams. It is also known as HACBS Hall. It was added to the Queensland Heritage Register on 27 April 2001.

== History ==
The Hibernian Hall in Roma is a large, timber-framed hall-cum-picture theatre erected in 1932 for the Roma branch of the Hibernian Australasian Catholic Benefit Society. It was designed by Perth and Brisbane architects Cavanagh & Cavanagh.

Roma was the principal town of the Mount Abundance district, which was developed as a pastoral and agricultural region following exploration by Thomas Mitchell, Surveyor General of New South Wales in 1846. The township of Roma was proclaimed in September 1862, one of the earliest towns established in Queensland after separation from New South Wales in 1859, and was surveyed in 1863. It was named after Lady Bowen (the Countess Diamantina Georgina di Roma), daughter of a Governor of the Ionian Islands, and wife of the first Governor of Queensland, Sir George Ferguson Bowen. The town of Roma was declared a municipality in 1867 and grew slowly as a pastoral service centre and government administrative centre until the opening of the Western railway line in the 1880s, connecting the Maranoa to the coastal ports, after which the town flourished. In addition, the vast Great Artesian Basin was tapped in the late 1880s and early 1890s, securing an alternative water supply for cattle and sheep.

With the expansion of Roma's population in the 1880s, a branch of the Hibernian Australasian Catholic Benefit Society was established in the town in April 1886. At its peak, the society attracted nearly 180 members. "Hibernian" is defined as of or belonging to Ireland, or Irish. From the 1860s Irish immigration to Queensland was encouraged by the Catholic Church in Queensland. Thousands of Catholic Irish working-class emigrants were attracted to the colony, and although they settled widely, they tended to form enclaves within towns and districts, defined by their religion and their societies. Hibernian Associations flourished in late 19th/early 20th century Queensland, strongly supported by the Catholic Church, and attracted widespread Irish Catholic membership. They could be considered the voluntary social welfare extension of official Catholicism.

Benefit societies were popular in 19th century Australia, where self-help was the dominant philosophy and liberalism a principal ideology, and where colonial governments made little provision for public welfare benefits. Modelled on similar mutual benefit societies established in Britain, the Australian societies provided contributing members with access to financial assistance such as sickness benefits, life insurance, provision of funeral costs, and benefits to members' widows and families. Some societies lent money to their members to finance home construction. Benefit societies also operated as social clubs, organising events such as dances and sports days which played an important role in the social life of the community, particularly in country districts. Roma Hibernians organised sports days, campdrafts and rodeos until 1946.

The Roma HACBS acquired the site of the present hall late in 1899, and erected their first hall on this property in 1900. Later an open-air cinema was established beside the Hibernian Hall, on the south side, which was the venue for the first moving picture show exhibited at Roma.

This first hall was enlarged in the mid-1920s, to plans prepared by popular Perth and Brisbane architects Cavanagh & Cavanagh, who had designed several churches, convents, schools and presbyteries for the Catholic Church in Queensland. The extensions had been completed by May 1926, at which time the hall was described as a two-storeyed timber building with a gallery; it could seat 750, and could be used for a variety of public entertainments. This building was destroyed by fire on 22 July 1931, but almost immediately the HACBS commissioned Cavanagh & Cavanagh to prepare plans for a replacement hall-cum-picture theatre (the present building) by GP Williams. The architects called tenders in October–November 1931, with the contract let to Roma contractor GP Williams. The building was erected at a cost of £3,120, and was officially opened on 28 June 1932.

The double-storeyed facade of the new Hibernian Hall, with its stepped parapet and curved pediment, oriel window to the projection room above an ungated opening to the foyer and ticket-box, read more as a picture theatre than a community hall. The building demonstrated many of the principal elements of "tropical" picture theatre design of this era, including: panels of open timber lattice high along each side wall, just under the roofline and sheltered by the eaves, for cross-ventilation purposes; a row of large bi-fold doors along each side of the hall which could be opened in hot weather, those on the southern side opening to a covered promenade along the side of the building; pressed metal and fretwork panels in the auditorium ceiling, accommodating ventilation and acoustic requirements with decorative effect; a decorative pressed metal proscenium arch; a stage area which could accommodate live performance as well as film screenings; and the projection booth (or bio-box) located above the foyer and ticket box. Elements more characteristic of a hall than a picture theatre were the flat, sprung timber floor, the lack of a dress circle, the inclusion of a supper room beneath the stage, and the lack of a theatre cafe.

The Hibernian Hall screened films in competition with Roma's newly completed, 800 seat Capitol Theatre, likely designed by Brisbane cinema architect CE Humphreys. The Capitol, operated by RA Crawford, was erected c. 1932 and functioned as a cinema until destroyed by fire in 1989. That the town of Roma could support two picture theatres in the 1930s illustrates the popularity of film as family entertainment prior to the introduction of television.

The Hibernian Hall functioned as much more than a picture theatre. The scale and facilities of the new building guaranteed its popularity as the premier venue for community and social events in Roma, including balls, dances, fetes, choral and school concerts, protest meetings, farewell functions, election meetings, political speeches, religious festivals, art shows, and touring entertainment (everything from ballet, opera and theatre to vaudeville and pantomime). The Hibernian Hall also served as a temporary venue for services when the new Catholic Church was being built, and as the venue for sittings of the Supreme Court.

The hall was acquired by the Roma Town Council in 1976 and continues to be used for community and social activities, including regular roller skating. It no longer functions as a picture theatre.

== Description ==
The Hibernian Hall is a large, predominantly timber-framed building, rectangular in form, roofed in short-length corrugated iron sheeting. It has an entrance area with a bio-box over a large auditorium and a stage area. There are later skillion-roofed extensions to the rear (east) end and a large shed structure attached via a covered walkway to the south-east corner of the building.

The front (west) elevation comprises a two-storeyed decorative gable structure with asymmetric single-storeyed wing walls to the side. The ground floor and wing walls are of rendered masonry construction, while the first storey decorative gable is formed in pressed metal sheeting over timber. The ground floor has a centrally placed open entrance, over which is a cantilevered awning with pressed metal detailing. There are two symmetrically placed windows with decorative architraves. The window on the south side is a 6:9 pane timber vertical sliding sash, and the window on the north side is a 6:1 pane timber vertical sliding sash. The side wing walls are terminated by a pilaster with a decorative cap. The north wall which has a pair of vertical timber doors, acts purely as a screen wall with no building behind. The south wall has a 6:4 pane timber vertical sliding sash window and a timber door giving access to a store room.

The first storey facade, set between 2 pilasters with decorative caps, is based on the Dutch gable style. There is a centrally placed oriel window with a pressed metal base and corrugated iron hipped roof. The side lights are single 4:1 pane timber vertical sliding sashes and the front light is a pair of 6:1 pane timber vertical sliding sashes. There is a single 4:1 pane vertical sliding sash window placed symmetrically either side of the oriel. These windows have a hood supported on decorative brackets. Above the oriel there are the initials "H.A.C.B.S." in raised lettering inside a curved border. There is a single shamrock on the face of the pilasters.

The side elevations are of a similar design, with the south side having a single-storeyed skillion-roofed awning over a promenade or verandah. The walls comprise 9 bays, which reflect the internal layout of the building, with the bay at the western end for the 2 storey entrance/store/bio-box area, 7 bays to the auditorium, and 1 bay at the eastern end for the stage area. The walls are constructed of timber framing. There are 7 external concrete buttresses along each wall, between which there are 5 pairs of timber bi-fold doors with skylight over. On either side, beneath the roof line, there are 7 high level panels of later metal vertical louvres providing cross-ventilation to the auditorium, with remnant panels of timber lattice above, which have been sheeted from the inside of the auditorium. Above the doors on the north side there is horizontal boarding (chamfers). On the south side, beneath the verandah awning, there is exposed stud framing above the doors. The verandah has a store at the western end, is open for the length of the auditorium and has toilets at the eastern end. The walls to the stage area are clad in horizontal boarding. The rear (eastern) elevation is of timber framing clad in vertical sheets of corrugated iron. There are 2 windows at the northern end of this rear wall, one to the rear of the stage and another to a supper room located beneath the stage. There is also a fire-escape door to the sub-floor supper room. There is a modern lean-to extension at the southern end of the rear wall, clad in vertical metal sheeting, containing changing rooms.

Internally, inside the entrance there is a centrally placed 3-sided ticket booth. To the south side is a store room, and to the north a staircase to the first floor bio-box. The auditorium is accessed through 2 pairs of bi-fold doors either side of the ticket booth. There are also 3 single doors in the western wall providing access to the ticket box, a store room and the staircase. The bio-box window has been in-filled.

The auditorium has a seven bay canted ceiling comprising alternative bays of decorative pressed metal and open timber lattice. The floor is timber and level, suitable for dancing. The walls are of vertical timber with a dado rail running around. At the northern end is a raised stage area which projects into the auditorium. The proscenium arch is formed from decorative pressed metal sheeting. There are doors either side of the stage. The door at the south side is blocked by a single flight of metal stairs. The rear stage area has open stud timber framed walls and an exposed roof framing. There is no fly tower, but the roof over the stage is probably of sufficient height to accommodate some raised scenery. There is a supper room beneath the stage area.

The southern verandah opens onto a large courtyard, the site of the former open-air cinema, which is used now as a basketball court. At the rear of the courtyard is a substantial canteen and shelter shed, clad in vertical metal sheeting.

== Heritage listing ==
Hibernian Hall was listed on the Queensland Heritage Register on 27 April 2001 having satisfied the following criteria.

The place is important in demonstrating the evolution or pattern of Queensland's history.

The Hibernian Hall, 38–44 Hawthorne Street, Roma is important in illustrating the pattern of Queensland's history, the scale of the hall illustrating the importance of Roma as a regional and recreational centre for the surrounding pastoral and agricultural district, and the importance of community groups in maintaining the social fabric of rural communities in the first half of the 20th century. The place has a strong association with the work of the Roma branch of the Hibernian Australasian Catholic Benefit Society from the turn of the 20th century through to the 1970s.

The place is important in demonstrating the principal characteristics of a particular class of cultural places.

The Hibernian Hall remains highly intact, and is an excellent example of a large, purpose-designed hall-cum-picture theatre of the interwar period. It is important in demonstrating the principal characteristics of its type, including the "picture theatre" facade; the projection booth above the foyer and ticket-box; the large auditorium with its use of decorative pressed metal and timber lattice in the ceiling; the use of timber lattice panelling high in the side walls for cross-ventilation purposes; the stage which could accommodate both live-performance and film screenings; the large, sprung timber dance floor opening onto an external verandah promenade; and the inclusion of a supper room.

The place is important because of its aesthetic significance.

The place has aesthetic value, engendered by the two-storeyed, shaped-pediment facade with its pressed metal finish and oriel window above a central foyer opening and awning; and by the interior detailing, including the use of pressed metal and timber latticing. The Hibernian Hall is a substantial structure with a decorative front facade designed to impress, is prominently located on a major street, and in form, materials, scale and design, makes a strong contribution to the townscape of Roma.

The place has a strong or special association with a particular community or cultural group for social, cultural or spiritual reasons.

The place has social value, being the venue for a diversity of community, social and recreational events over many decades.

The place has a special association with the life or work of a particular person, group or organisation of importance in Queensland's history.

The place has a strong association with the work of the Roma branch of the Hibernian Australasian Catholic Benefit Society from the turn of the 20th century through to the 1970s.
