= Old Central Fire Station (Perth) =

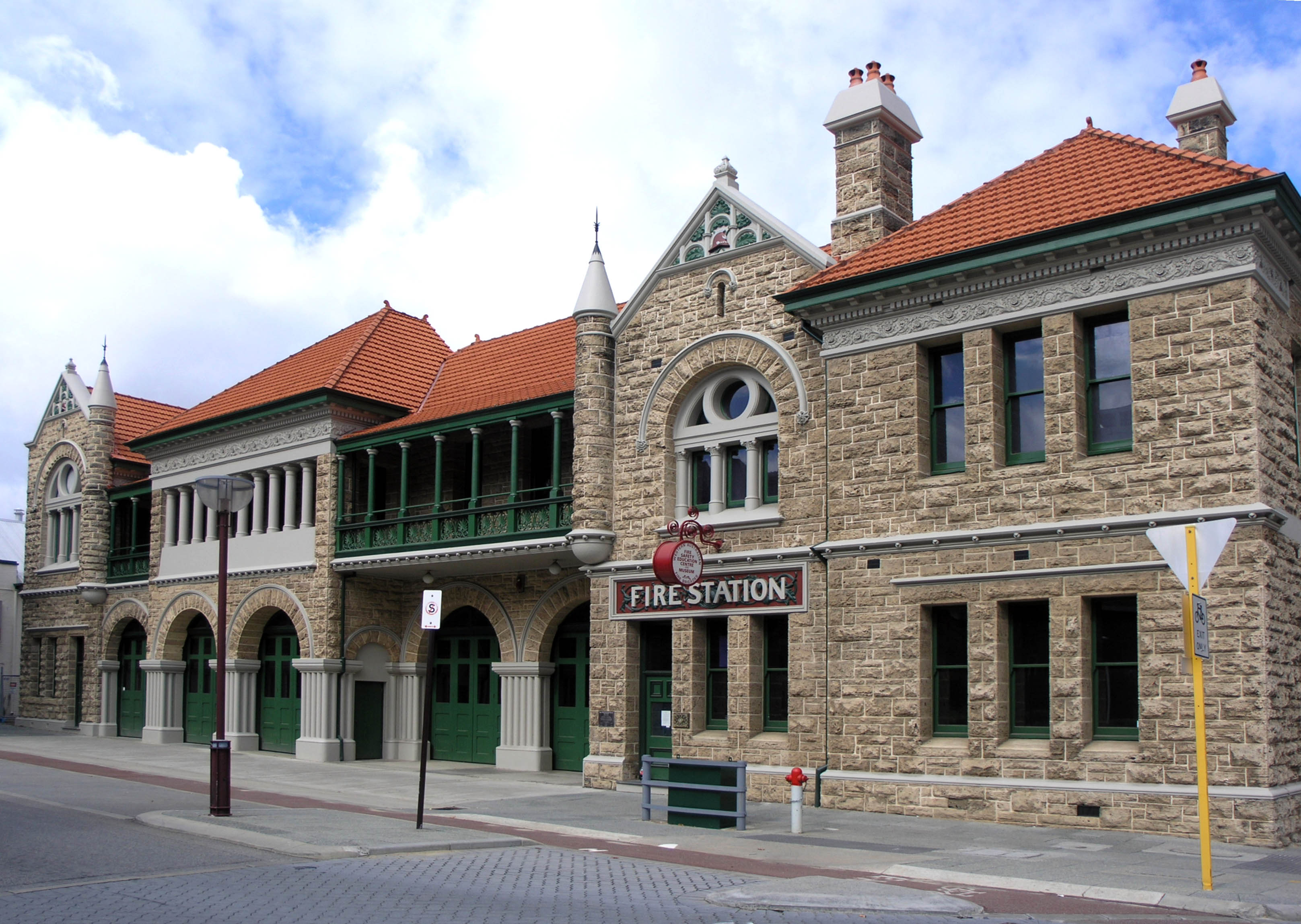
- Northern façade viewed from intersection of Murray and Irwin streets
- Former names: No. 1 Fire Station; Fire Brigade No. 1 Station; Central Fire Station; Perth City Fire Station

General information
- Type: Heritage listed building
- Location: Perth, Western Australia
- Coordinates: 31.954828°S 115.864288°E
- Completed: December 1900; 125 years ago

Western Australia Heritage Register
- Type: State Registered Place
- Designated: 18 November 2008
- Reference no.: 2051

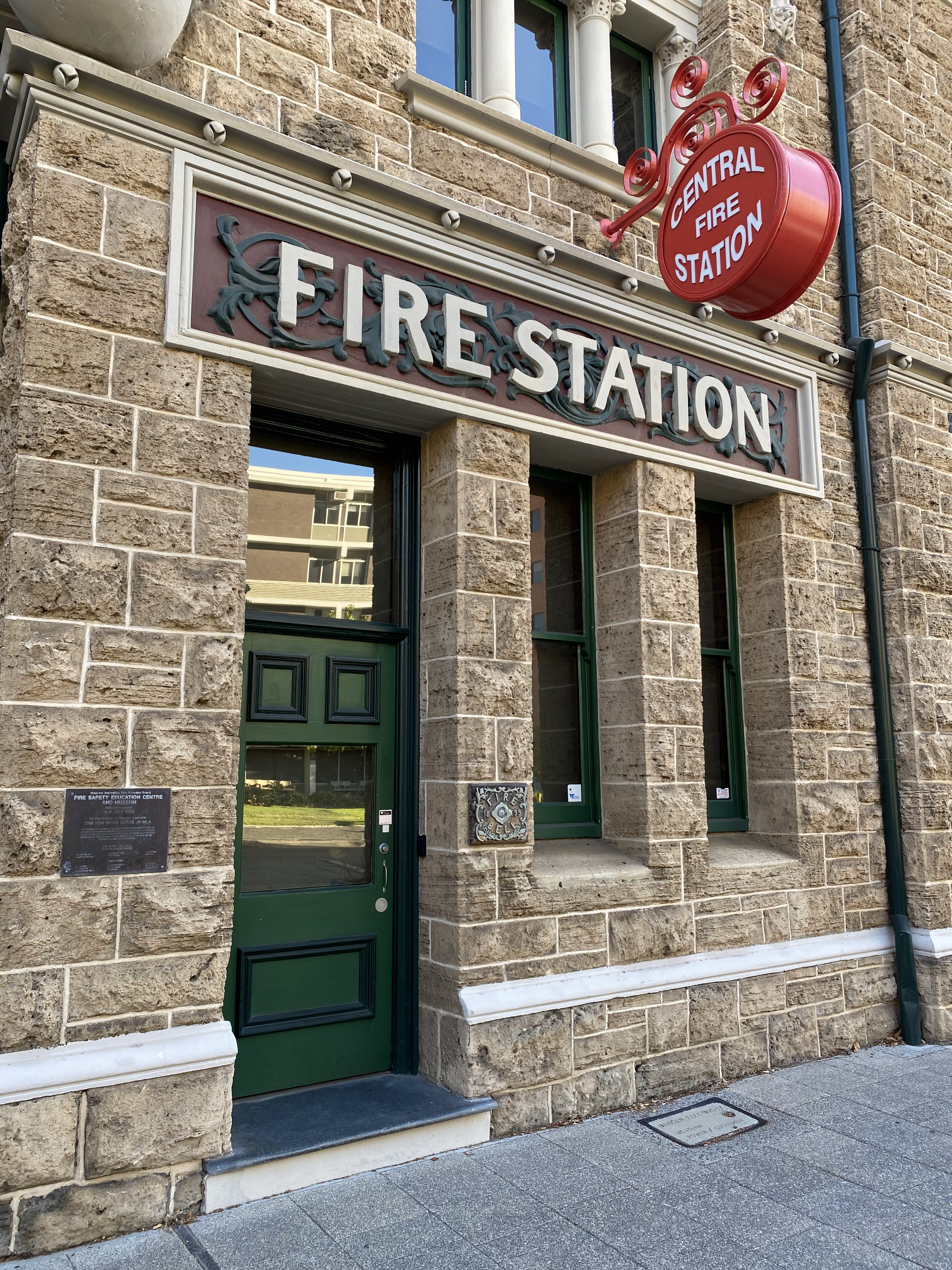
Entrance to the building

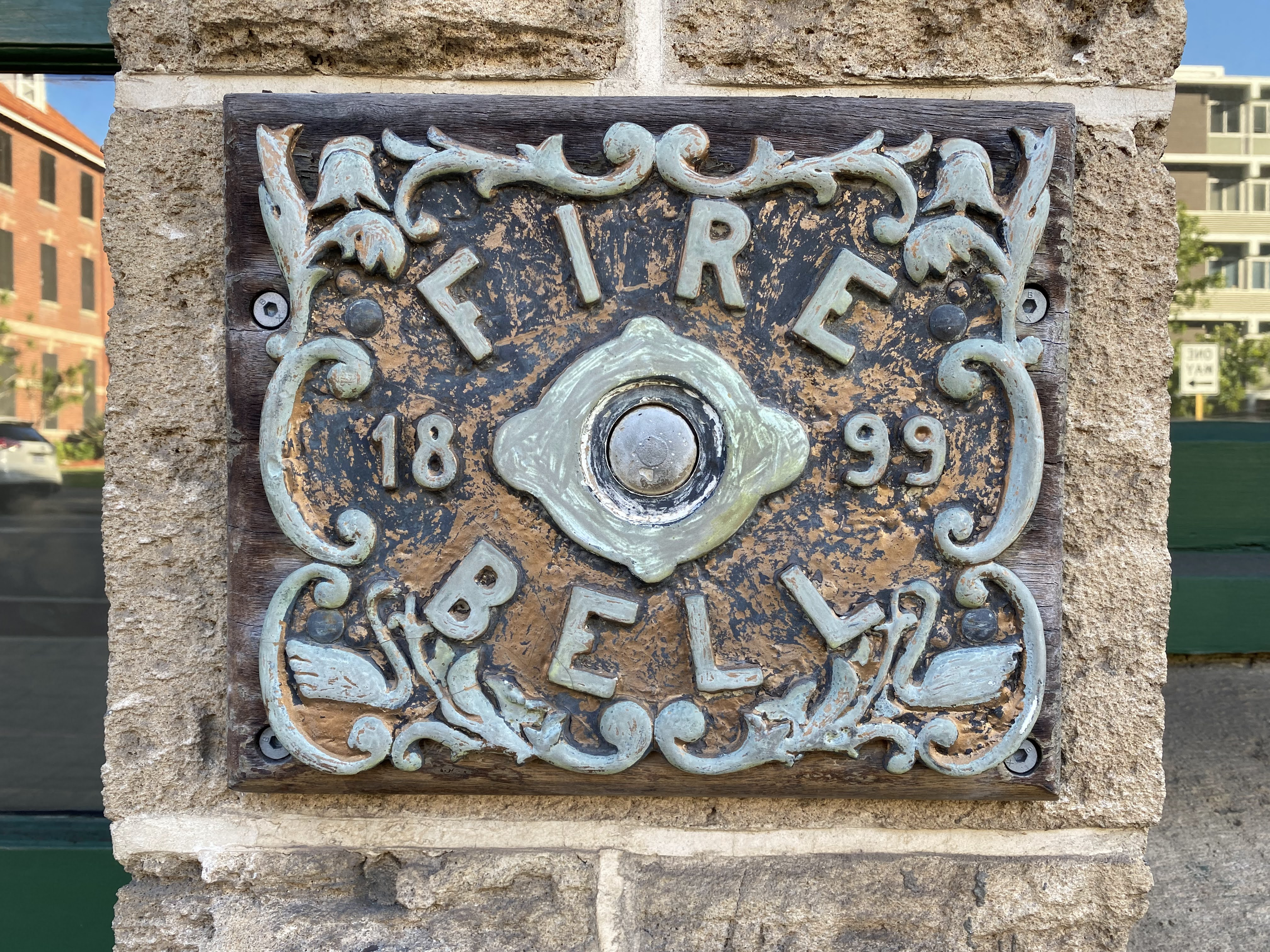
The fire bell

Old Central Fire Station is located at 25 Murray Street, at its intersection with Irwin Street, in Perth, Western Australia.

It was the first purpose-built fire station in Western Australia. Opened in 1901, the station remained in operation until 1979. The building now houses the Department of Fire and Emergency Services (DFES) Heritage Centre, a museum displaying historic documents and vintage vehicles from the emergency services' early days.

== Built form ==
The fire station was designed by Michael Cavanagh with Romanesque Revival stylistic influences and built around 1900. It is a two-storey rusticated limestone and tile roofed corner building, and has a diverse façade with arches, turrets and recessed colonnades.

== History ==
The fire brigade's original premises were located in the undercroft area of the Perth Town Hall, for which they paid a nominal rent. In 1899 the Fire Brigade Board proposed that land be bought in the proximity of the Perth Town Hall and a new station be built. In October 1899 it was reported that the Roman Catholic Bishop Gibney had offered some land at the intersection of Murray and Irwin streets, which was then purchased for £3,125, equivalent to A$563,400 in 2022. A list of architects was submitted to the board, which on 26 October 1899 selected Michael Cavanagh, with the stipulation that the building he design not exceed £4,000. Cavanagh was an architect who came from Adelaide to Perth in 1895, attracted by the gold boom prosperity in Western Australia. He formed his own architectural firm, Cavanagh & Cavanagh, with his brother James. Cavanagh also designed the Great Western Hotel (Brass Monkey Hotel), alterations to St Mary's Cathedral, Mount Hawthorn Hotel (Paddington Ale House), Fremantle Fire Station (1908), St Patrick's Basilica in Fremantle, Sisters of Mercy Convent in Bunbury and remodelled the Archbishop's Palace. In the early 1900s Cavanagh was a member of the Perth City Council and a member of the Perth Fire Brigade Board. The building was completed in December 1900 and the fire brigade moved into their new premises on 1 January 1901.

By 1910, the fire brigade was finding it necessary to expand and decided that the fire station would have to be extended in order to accommodate extra plant, extra workshop accommodation, a boardroom and officers' quarters. The block adjacent to the station in Irwin Street was purchased from the Roman Catholic Church and the board at a cost of £A 2,100. This block of land had a school building on it, so the building committee recommended that the fire brigade staff (many of whom were skilled tradesmen) "undertake the building of the workshops and lecture room with the old material available in the school". James (Jack) Learmonth Ochiltree was appointed as the architect for the additions. (Ochiltree's firm, Ochiltree & Hargrave, went on to design a number of Inter-War Art Deco buildings in Perth.) The additions to the building consisted of a new boardroom, offices, apparatus room, ambulance shed, store and chief officers' quarters, and was completed in 1914.

== Current use ==
In 1979, the fire brigade vacated the building, which was subsequently restored between 1983 and 1985. The external work involved re-roofing with terracotta tiles to match existing, reconstruction of a limestone arch that had been replaced with a concrete lintel to suit larger and higher engines, and replacement of columns, mouldings and original doors which had been removed. Internal work included new timber stairs, toilets and a theatrette. New ceiling cornices and ceiling roses were installed to match the period and the existing.

The building was reopened in 1985 as the Fire Safety Education Centre and Museum. In 2006 further refurbishment works were undertaken to address access by people with disabilities to the buildings and facilities. Now refurbished, the old station characterises both past and present emergency services through displays dedicated to the history of Western Australian fire services and a natural hazards and disasters education gallery.

== Heritage value ==
The Old Central Fire Station building was entered into the Register of the National Estate by the Australian Heritage Commission on 21 March 1978, and was classified by the National Trust (WA) on 1 December 1975. The proposal identified value in the architectural style, 'Federation Romanesque', the turreted entrance was an exceptional feature of the well known landmark. The building is also included on the City of Perth's municipal inventory and was interim listed on the State Register of Heritage Places on 13 March 1992. On 3 December 2008 the building was permanently listed on the Western Australian Heritage Register.
