= Michael Cavanagh (architect) =

Australian architect

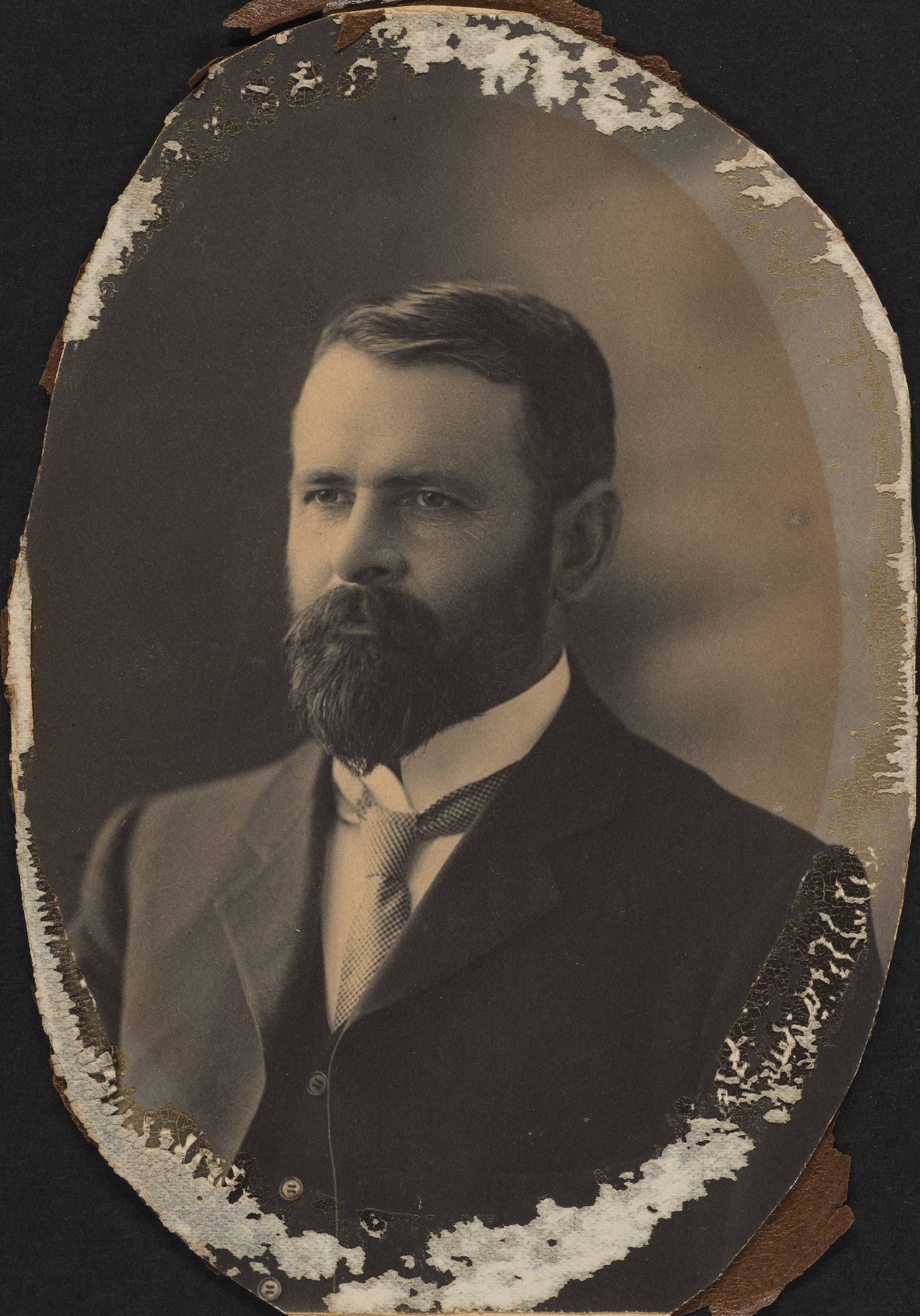
- Cavanagh c. 1903
- Born: Michael Francis Cavanagh; August 1860; Beechworth, Victoria
- Died: 29 May 1941 (aged 80); Subiaco, Western Australia
- Occupation: Architect
- Spouse: Dorothy Le Poer Trench
- Children: Dorothea Maria (1898); John "Jack" (1900); Brendan (1904)
- Parent(s): John Charles Cavanagh and Mary Josephine nee Lyons
- Relatives: son-in-law of Robert Le Poer Trench,

Michael Francis Cavanagh (August 1860 – 29 May 1941) was an Australian architect, primarily known for his work in Western Australia from 1895 to the late 1930s.

== Early life and education ==
Cavanagh was born in August 1860 near Beechworth, Victoria, the second son of an Irish born builder and contractor, John Cavanagh ( – 18 March 1895). In 1881 his family moved to Adelaide, South Australia, where his father took on a position as supervisor of public buildings in the Government Architect's Department. Cavanagh in his early teens first studied at the South Australian School of Art before entering the Government Architecture's Department, where he received architectural training (c. 1882 – 1886). In 1887 he left to study architecture in London, in the studio-offices of John Slater, and then with Frank Baggallay and Walter Millard, before entering the National Art Training School. In 1888 Cavanagh passed examinations obtaining an associateship with the Royal Institute of British Architects. He was also elected a Fellow of the Royal Historical Society for his studies in ancient and modern architecture and art.

He returned to South Australia and rejoined the Government Architect's Department, eventually reaching the position of Chief Draughtsman. In 1891 he established his own private practice, where he designed a number of buildings in Adelaide, Peterborough and Port Pirie, including the Barrier Hotel in Port Pirie. Cavanagh served on the board of the Art Gallery, Museum and Library and was a member of the Adelaide Art Circle and South Australian Society of Arts. He was also a councillor at the Adelaide City Council, the president of the South Australia Institute of Architects and a founding member of the South Australian branch of the Australian Natives' Association and the Wattle Day League.

== Western Australia works ==
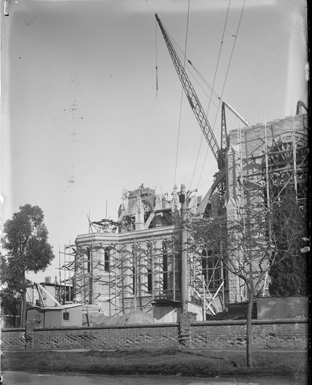
The expansion of St Mary's Cathedral in 1929

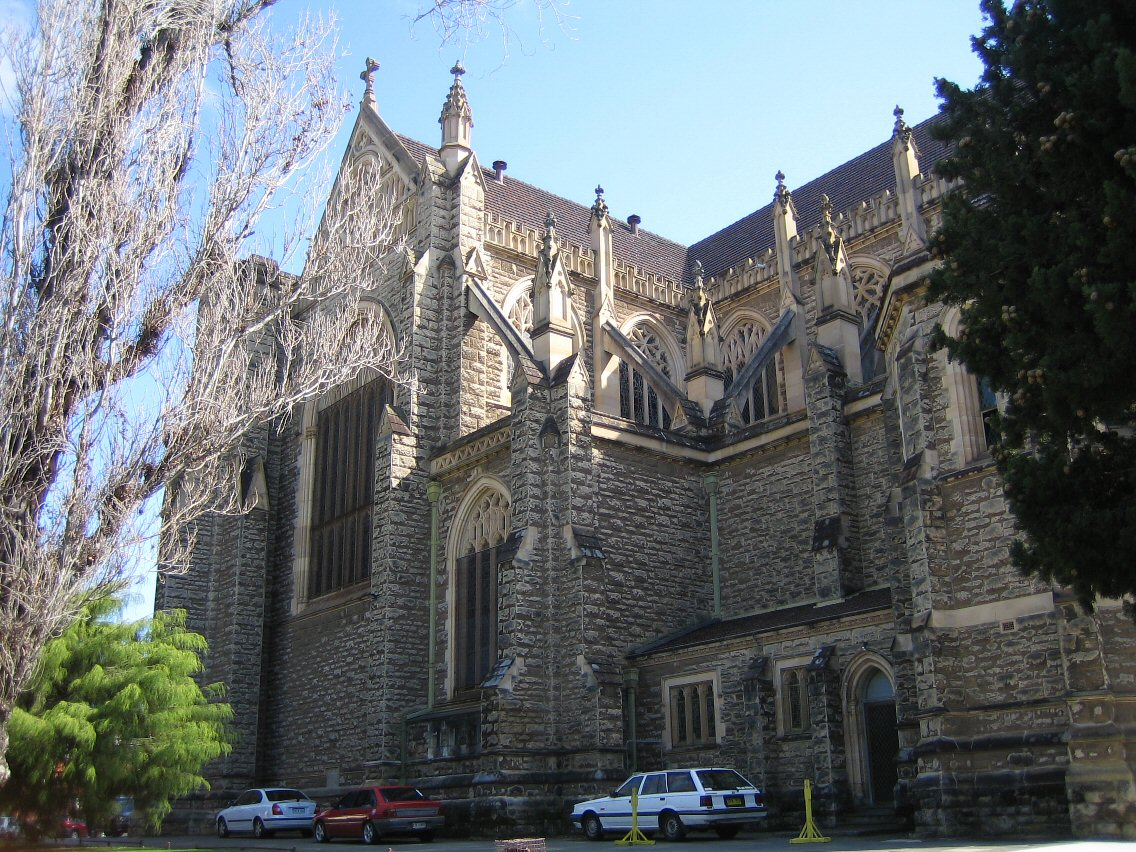
The apse and transept of the 1930 portion of St Mary's Cathedral

In 1895 he moved to Western Australia, with the objective of establishing a branch of his firm in Perth. In 1896 he designed the Great Western Hotel, a three-storey brick, stucco and iron roof hotel, on the corner of James and William Streets, Northbridge. Cavanagh designed the hotel in the Federation Filigree architectural style and it was one of the most lavish hotels constructed in Perth during the Western Australian gold boom.

On 11 May 1897 he married Dorothy Le Poer Trench, the third daughter of Hon. Judge Robert Le Poer Trench, QC, a County Court Judge of Ballarat, at St Mary's Cathedral, Perth.

In 1898 the Missionary Oblates of Mary Immaculate commissioned Cavanagh to design a new church on the site of a former Benedictine church in Fremantle. The church is an imposing limestone building in the Federation Gothic style with decorated Gothic detailing. St. Patrick's Basilica was consecrated in June 1900, with numerous dignitaries, including John Forrest, in attendance. It is one of five churches in Australia with minor basilica status.

In 1900 he was joined by his younger brother, James Charles, who became a partner in the architectural practice, Cavanagh and Cavanagh. The firm had a long association with the Catholic Church, designing a number of hospitals, schools and churches.

In 1924 the Roman Catholic Archbishop of Perth, Patrick Clune, commenced an appeal to fund the construction of a larger cathedral, to replace the original 1865 building (which was a simple two storey Norman Gothic style building), in his own words "building a Cathedral worthy of Almighty God, of the Archdiocese and of the City of Perth". Cavanagh was appointed architect for the project and he produced plans for a completely new limestone Academic Gothic Cathedral. Due to financial constraints, associated with the onset of the Great Depression, it was decided to utilise the existing building, which subsequently became the nave, and add only new transepts and a sanctuary. The expanded, but incomplete, St Mary's Cathedral opened on 4 May 1930.

Cavanagh died at a private hospital in Subiaco on 29 May 1941, following a two-month illness, and was buried in the Roman Catholic portion of Karrakatta Cemetery.

== Achievements ==
Cavanagh was the inaugural vice-president of the Western Australian Institute of Architects in 1896 and president of the Institute between 1903–05 and 1915–17. (The WA Institute merged with other states' institutes in 1930 to form the Australian Institute of Architects.)

At the 1897 colonial election Cavanagh unsuccessfully ran as an independent candidate for the seat of North Perth.

In November 1900 he was elected as the West Ward Councillor for the City of Perth.

In the 1901 federal election he ran as the Protectionist Party candidate in the newly created Perth electorate. He obtained 40.9% of the vote, losing to the Labour candidate, James Fowler. He also unsuccessfully stood for the Senate during the 1903 Federal election.

He was also a member of the Fire Brigade's Board and the Perth Hospital Board.

== Notable works ==
- Christian Brothers' College, Perth (1895)
- Alterations to the Roman Catholic Archbishop's Palace, Perth (1911)
- Redemptorist Monastery, North Perth (1903)
- Oblate Fathers' Industrial School for Boys, Glendalough (1897)
- St Joseph's Orphanage, Wembley
- St John of God Sisters' Hospital and Convent, Subiaco (1898)
- St Brigid's Convent and St Brigid's Church, Northbridge (1897 and 1904)
- St Anthony's Convent of Mercy, Kalgoorlie (1902)
- Sisters of Mercy's Mercedes College, Perth (1896)
- St Patrick's Church, Katanning (1923)
- St Patrick's Basilica, Fremantle (1898)
- Alterations to St Mary's Cathedral, Perth (1924)
- Convent of Mercy, Bunbury (1897)
- St Joseph's Orphanage (Clontarf) (1901)
- St Bernard's Church, Kojonup
- Star of the Sea Church, Cottesloe (1904 and 1929)
- Edmund Rice Administration Wing at Aquinas College, Perth (1937–38)
- Central Fire Station, Perth (1900)
- Fremantle Fire Station, Fremantle (1909)
- Victoria Hotel, Toodyay (1937)
- Great Western (Brass Monkey) Hotel, Perth (1896)
- Esplanade Hotel, Perth (1898)
- Orient Hotel, Fremantle (1902)
- P&O Hotel, Fremantle (1896)
- Melville Park (Majestic) Hotel, Applecross
- Newcastle Club (Newport) Hotel, Fremantle (1897)
- Tambellup Hotel, Tambellup
- Lexbourne House, West Perth (1911)
- Manning Buildings & Chambers, Fremantle (1902)
- Foy & Gibson's (David Jones) Department Store, Perth (1903)

== See also ==
- List of Australian architects
- List of heritage buildings in Perth, Western Australia
- History of Western Australia
- Architecture of Australia
