= St Patrick's Basilica, Fremantle =

Church in Fremantle, Western Australia

St Patrick's Basilica
- Basilica of St Patrick
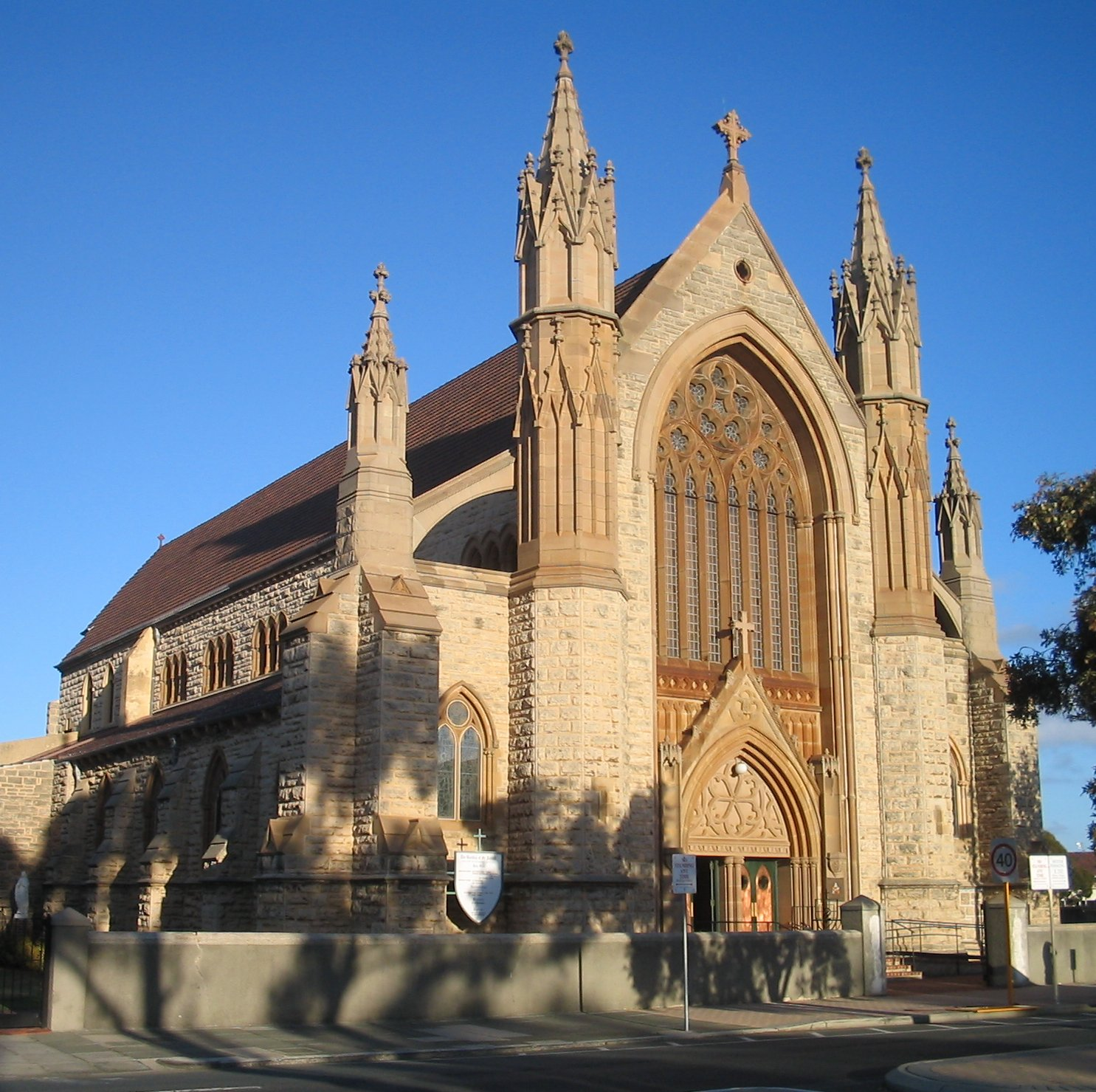
- Basilica of St Patrick's, Fremantle
- St Patrick's Basilica
- 32.0509°S 115.7500°E
- Address: Fremantle, Western Australia
- Country: Australia
- Denomination: Catholic Church
- Website: fremantlestpatricks.org.au

History
- Status: Minor Basilica
- Dedication: Saint Patrick

Architecture
- Functional status: Active
- Designated

Western Australia Heritage Register
- Type: State Registered Place
- Designated: 9 February 1996
- Reference no.: 845
- Architect: Michael Cavanagh
- Style: Federation Gothic

Clergy
- Priest: Father John Sebastian

The Basilica of Saint Patrick is a Roman Catholic church located on Adelaide Street in Fremantle, Western Australia.

Pope John Paul II raised the shrine to the status of Minor Basilica via his Pontifical decree Hoc Anno on 20 July 1994. The decree was signed and notarised by Cardinal Angelo Sodano.

== History ==
The parish of St Patrick Fremantle was created around 1850. In 1894, the Missionary Oblates of Mary Immaculate arrived in Australia from Ireland and the parish was given to their care. Here, they established their first community. In 1994, they celebrated a century of ministry to the church in Australia, and commissioned the current church as an icon in Fremantle as part of their celebrations.

Designed by Michael Cavanagh in a gothic revival style, the foundation stone was laid on St Patrick's Day, 17 March 1898 and the nave opened on 3 June 1900. The design incorporated a nave with aisles and clerestory, transepts, a wide and spacious apse, with a tower and spire supported by flying buttresses rising from the northern side. Only the nave was initially completed. A new sanctuary of equivalent scale was opened on 24 April 1960.

The building was raised to the status of a minor basilica in 1994. The basilica and adjacent presbytery are listed on the Western Australia Heritage Register.

== Blessing of the fleet ==
The parish is also linked into the annual blessing of the fleet in Fremantle.

== Pipe organ ==
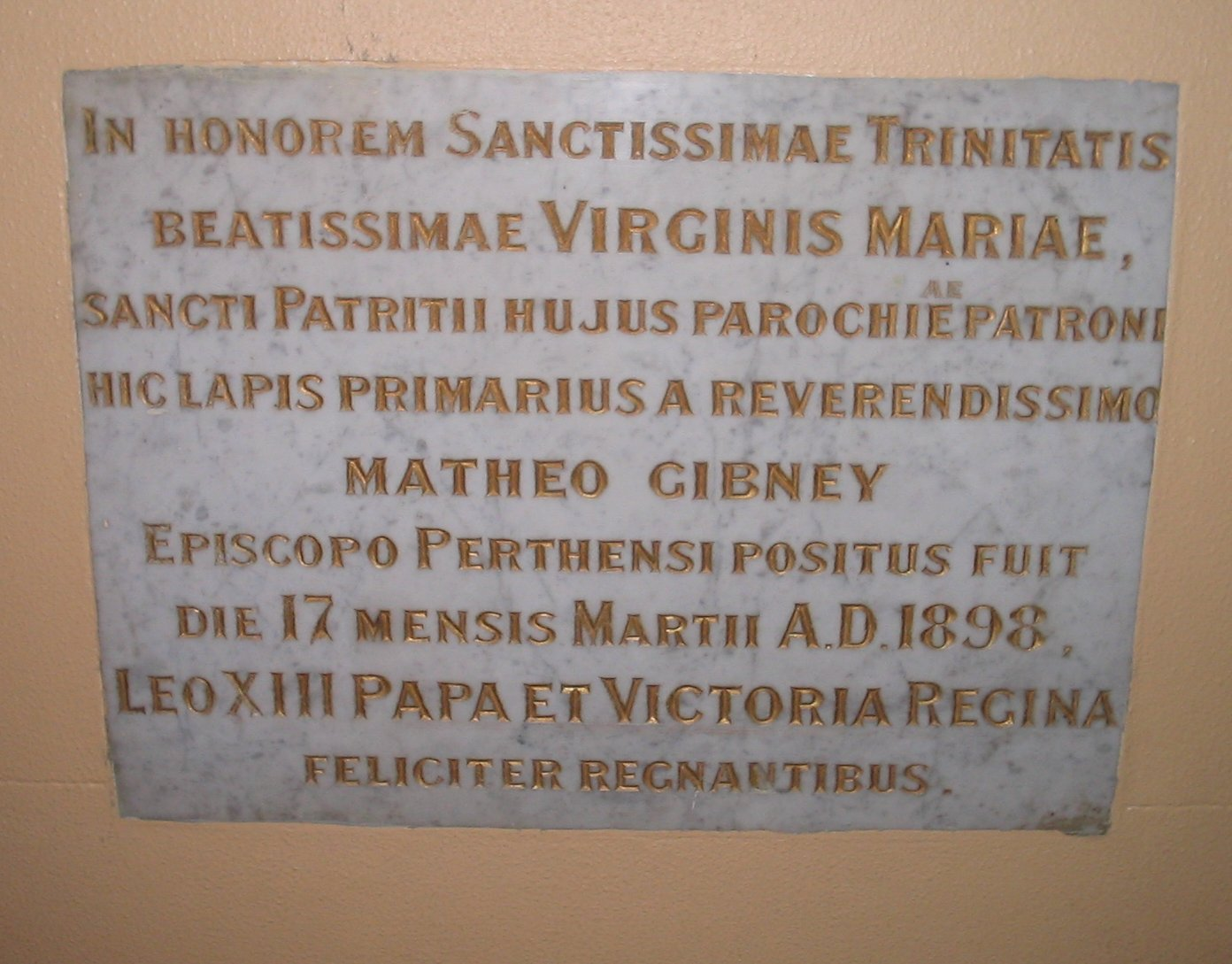
Foundation stone of St Patrick's

The original two manual organ was by Bishop & Son, of London, supplied in 1895. J.E. Dodd & Sons' Gunstar Organ Works electrified this organ in the 1960s and they divided the case and provided some extensions. The present organ dates from 1988 to 1990 and was built by Bellsham Pipe Organs (Aust.) Pty Ltd and incorporated some of the pipework and chests from the Bishop organ. Apart from the divided Grand Organ in the west gallery, it incorporated an interconnected two-manual organ in the south transept. The organs were given as a thanksgiving in memory of the many priests of the Congregation of Oblates of Mary Immaculate who have served the parish since their arrival from Ireland in 1894.

This instrument was extensively rebuilt and enlarged by the South Island Organ Company Ltd, of Timaru, New Zealand, with Rod Junor as consultant, and resulted from a private donation from the Hughes family in memory of Alice Hughes. The work was completed for Easter 1998 and represents the largest parish church organ in Australasia. The work carried out was extensive, involving the complete reorganisation and expansion of the internal layout, with several new divisions, additional pipework and complete revoicing, new winding system, new serial drive MIDI electrical and combination systems, made by Muldersoft of Auckland, and a new low profile transept console. The Grand Organ has four manuals and pedal, and 109 stops, while the Transept Organ has two manuals & pedal.

== See also ==
- Oblate Youth Australia
