= St. Alfred's Church =

Roman Catholic Church in Sha Tin, Hong Kong

Coordinates: 22°22′35″N 114°11′02″E

- 聖歐爾發堂
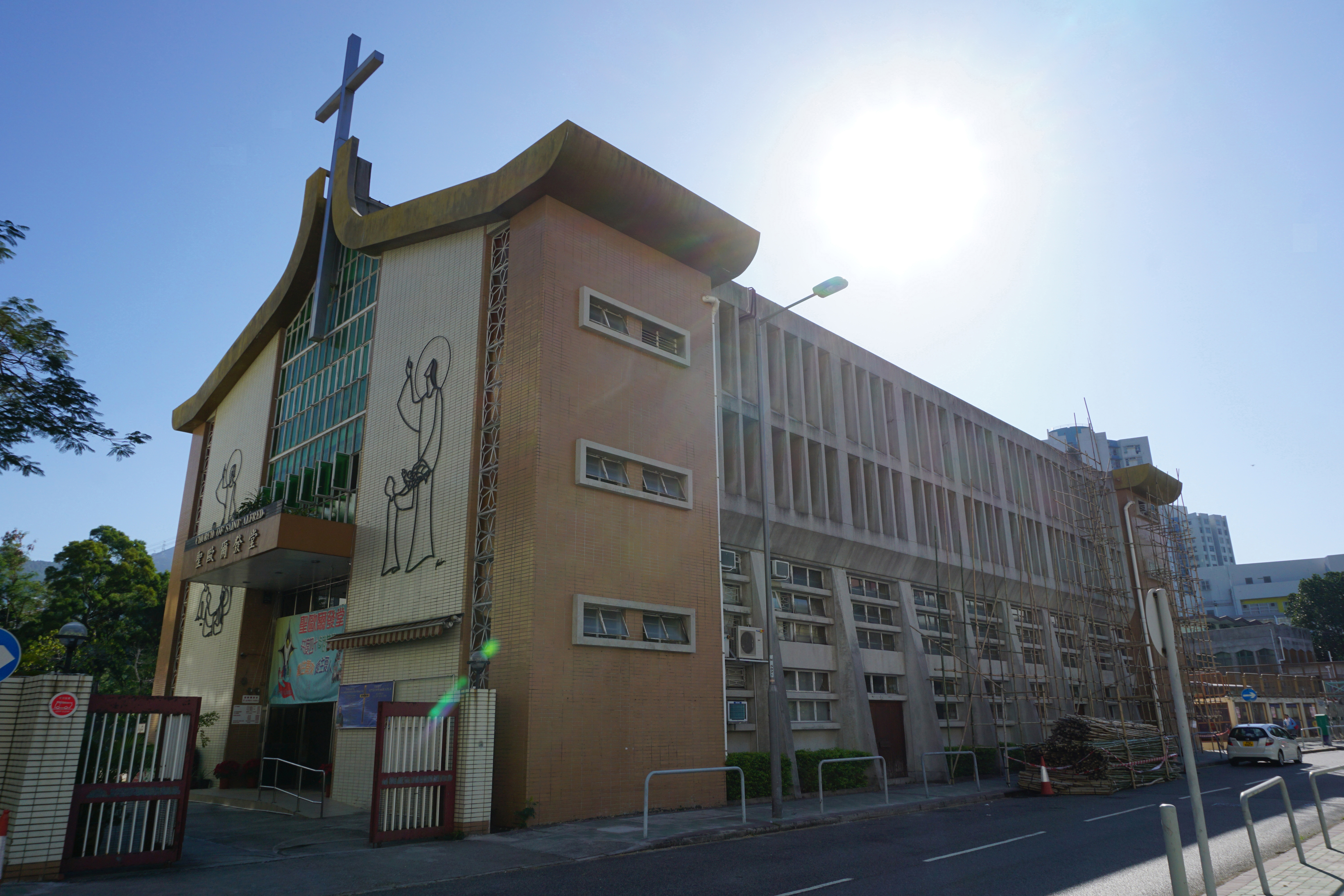
- St. Alfred's Church in Sha Tin.
- St. Alfred's Church
- Location: 19-21 Man Lai Road, Sha Tin, New Territories, Hong Kong
- Country: Hong Kong
- Denomination: Roman Catholic
- Website: stalfred.catholic.org.hk

History
- Status: Parish Church
- Founded: 1974; 52 years ago
- Consecrated: 27 March 1977; 49 years ago

Administration
- Diocese: Hong Kong

Clergy
- Bishop: Stephen Chow
- Priest: Luc Young Chen Yin OMI

St. Alfred's Church (Chinese: 聖歐爾發堂) is a Roman Catholic church located in Sha Tin, Hong Kong.

== History ==
St. Alfred's Church was established on 27 March 1977 with funds donated by the faithful in the Diocese of Essen, Germany. At the request of the benefactors, the church was dedicated to St. Alfred, a Benedictine monk who also served as Bishop of Hildesheim.

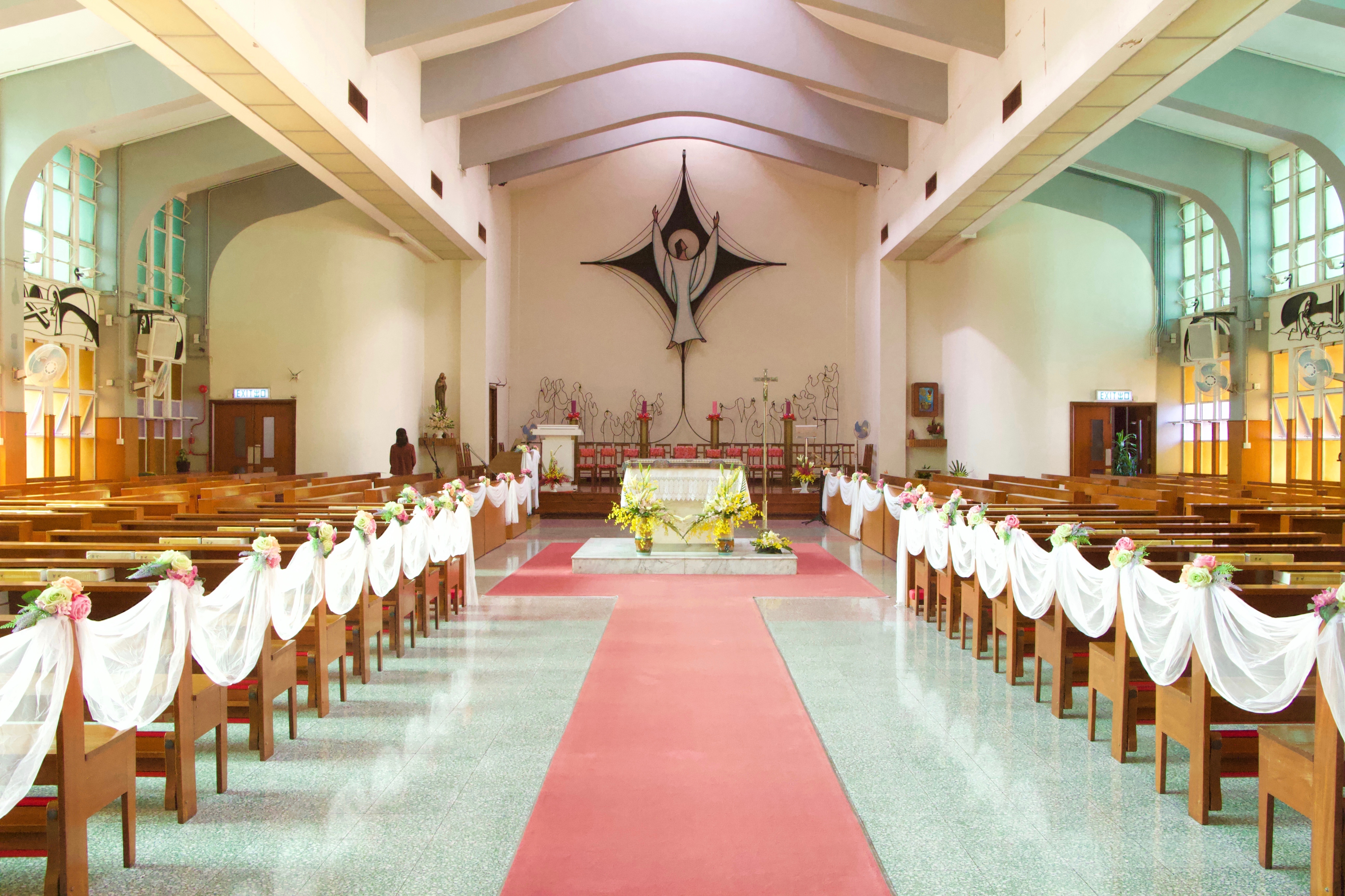
Church interior

== Clergy ==
Since 2006, St. Alfred's Church is now under the administration by the Fathers of the Missionary Oblates of Mary Immaculate.

- Parish Priest: Rev. Fr. Luc Young Chen Yin
- Assistant Priest: Rev. Fr. Dominic Fung King Ho
- Resident Priest: Rev. Fr. Stebin Thomas Kurisinkal

== See also ==
- List of Catholic churches in Hong Kong
