= Orient Hotel (Fremantle) =

Building in Fremantle, Western Australia

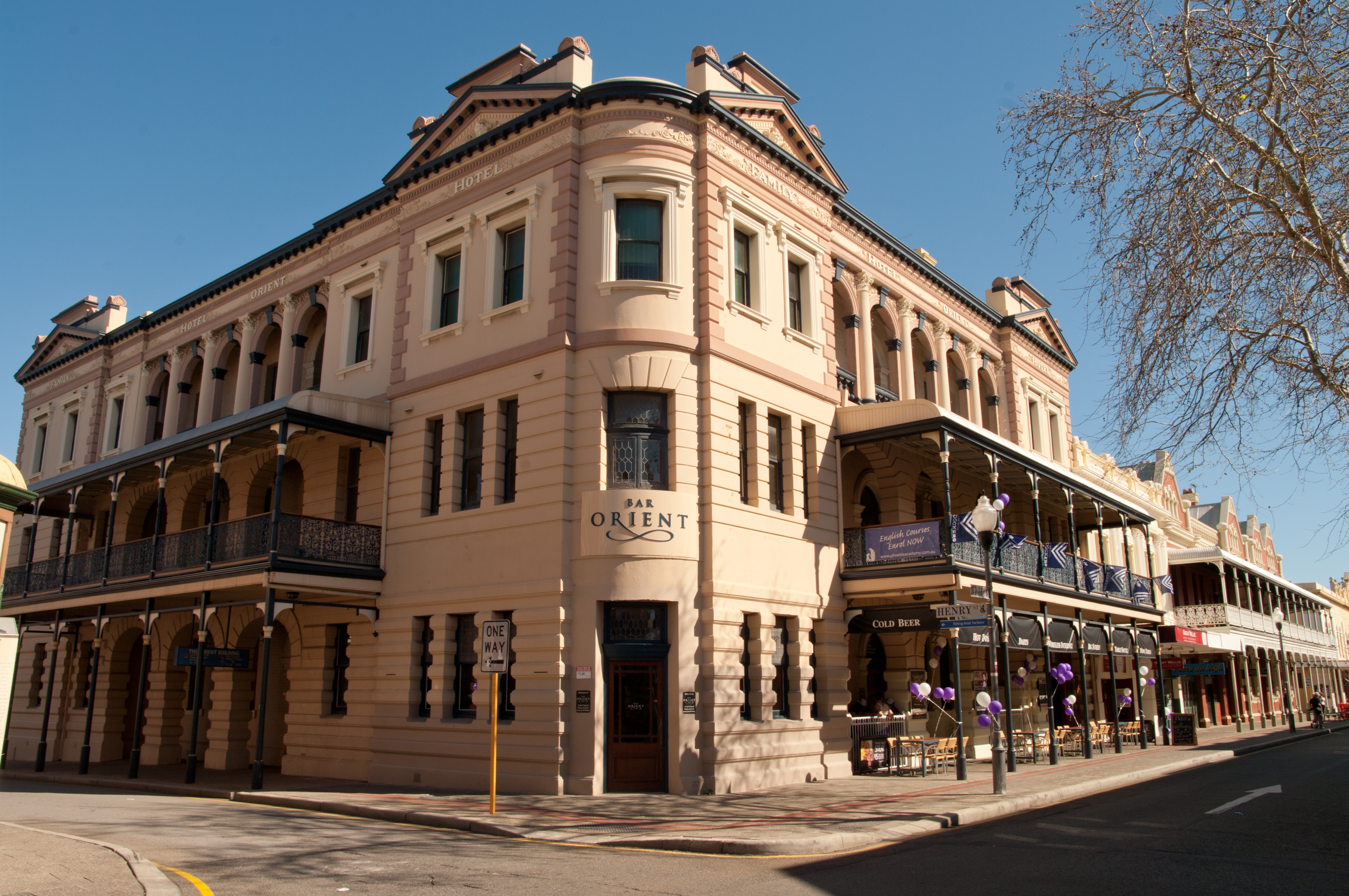
- Interactive map of the Orient Hotel area
- Former names: Blondies
- Alternative names: Bar Orient

General information
- Architectural style: Federation Academic Classical
- Location: Corner High and Henry streets, 39 High Street, Fremantle, Fremantle
- Coordinates: 32°3′19.47″S 115°44′38.45″E
- Construction started: 1902
- Completed: 1903
- Opened: 15 December 1902
- Renovated: 1971, 1976, 1982, 1995
- Cost: £8,000
- Renovation cost: $100,000(1971), $150,000(1982), $900,000(1995)

Technical details
- Floor count: 3

Design and construction
- Architect: Michael Cavanagh
- Main contractor: Atkin and Law

Renovating team
- Architects: LW Buckridge and Assoc. (1971)

Western Australia Heritage Register
- Type: State Registered Place
- Designated: 2 September 1997
- Part of: West End, Fremantle (25225)
- Reference no.: 914

The Orient Hotel is on the corner of High and Henry Streets in Fremantle, and was designed by Michael Cavanagh. Built by Atkin and Law in 1902/03, the building was owned by Thomas O'Beirne. Since it was built it has continued to be a hotel though it has had a number of proprietors including the Parry family from 1923 to 1971. Restoration works have been carried out on the building a number of times. Extensive works in 1995 included the replacement of the two story verandas.

Since 1849 the site had been the location of an inn known as "The Commercial", operated by Patrick Marmion. A subsequent refusal to renew the hotel license by the Fremantle Licensing Court saw that building demolished and replaced by the three storey building that now occupies the site.

During the 1950s and 1960s popular Fremantle politician Sir Frank Gibson and his wife resided in the Orient Hotel.
