= St Mary Star of the Sea, Peppermint Grove =

St Mary Star of the Sea
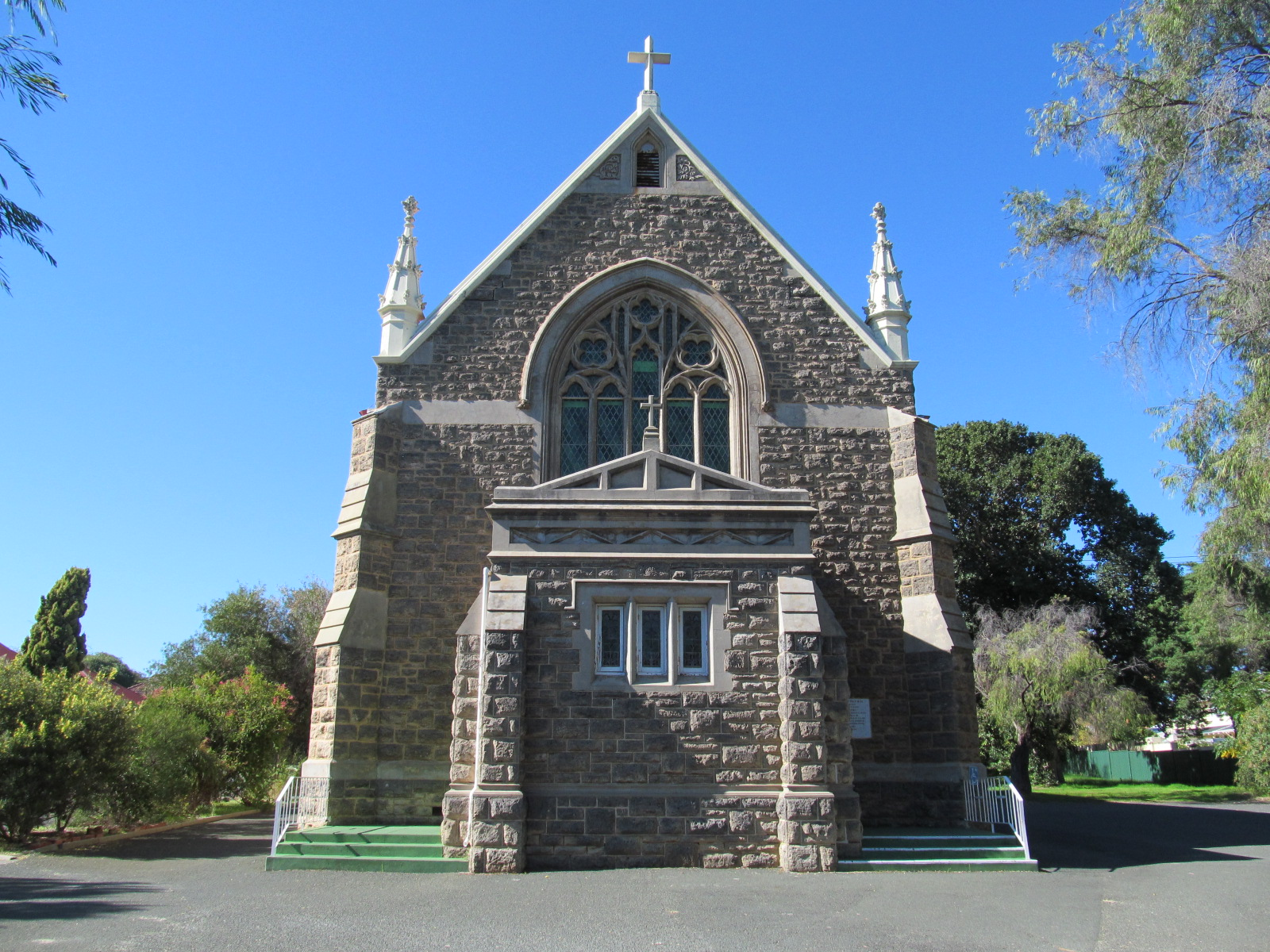
- St Mary Star of the Sea
- 31.9948°S 115.7655°E
- Location: 2 McNeil Street, Peppermint Grove, Western Australia
- Country: Australia
- Denomination: Roman Catholic
- Website: staroftheseachurch.org.au

History
- Status: Church
- Dedication: Our Lady, Star of the Sea
- Dedicated: 18 December 1904 by Bishop Matthew Gibney

Architecture
- Architect: Michael Cavanagh
- Architectural type: Gothic Revival architecture
- Completed: 1904
- Construction cost: £2,000

Administration
- Diocese: Perth

Clergy
- Priests: Marcelo Parra; Rodrigo da Costa Ponte

St Mary Star of the Sea is a parish of the Roman Catholic Church in Peppermint Grove, Western Australia. Located in the Archdiocese of Perth, it is dedicated to Our Lady, Star of the Sea.

== Location ==
The church building is located on Stirling Highway, between McNeil and Forrest streets in Peppermint Grove, a suburb of Perth in Western Australia. Given its proximity to Cottesloe, it is sometimes said to be in Cottesloe rather than Peppermint Grove. The Presbyterian Ladies' College is located behind the church.

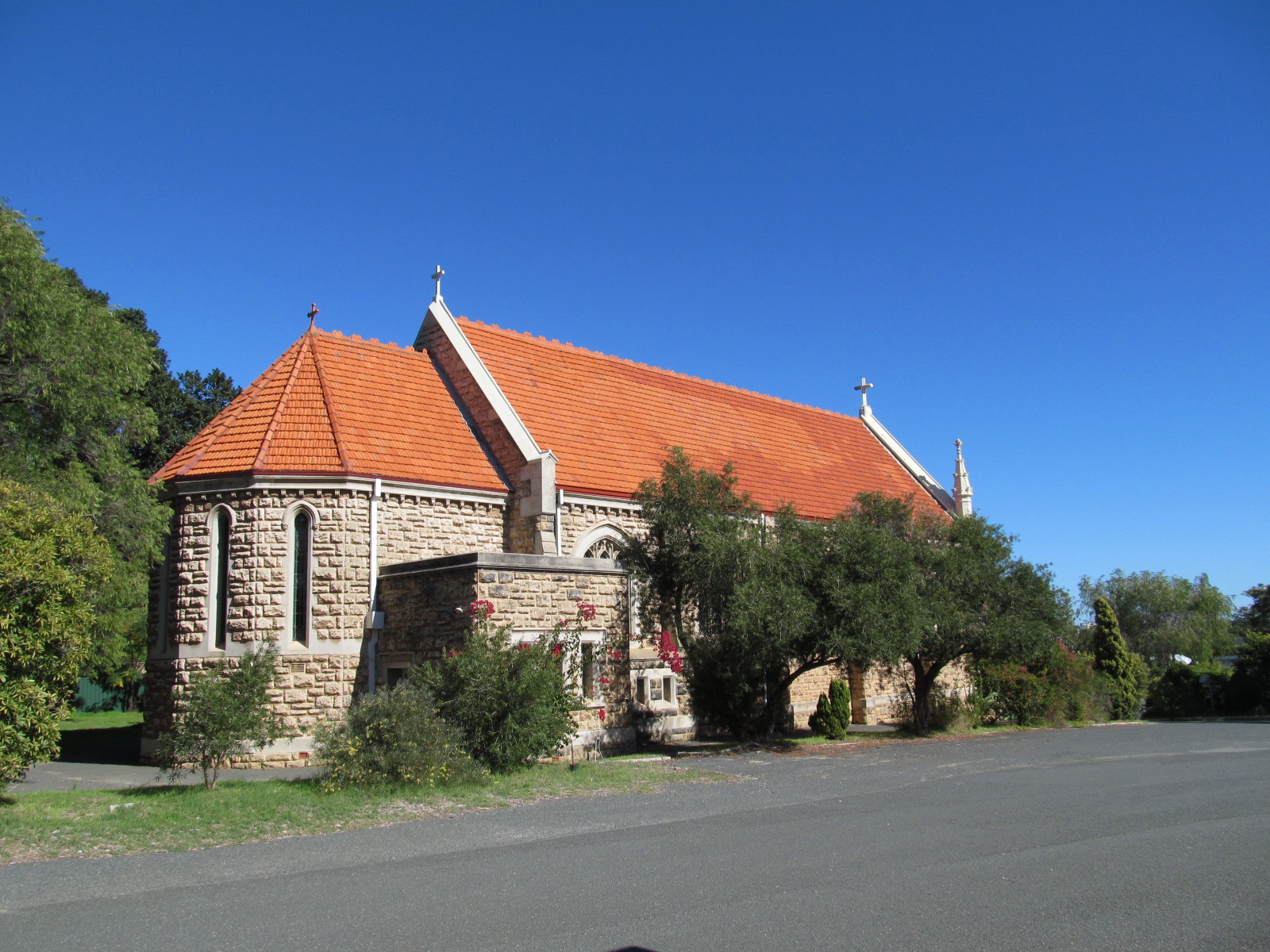
Side view of the church

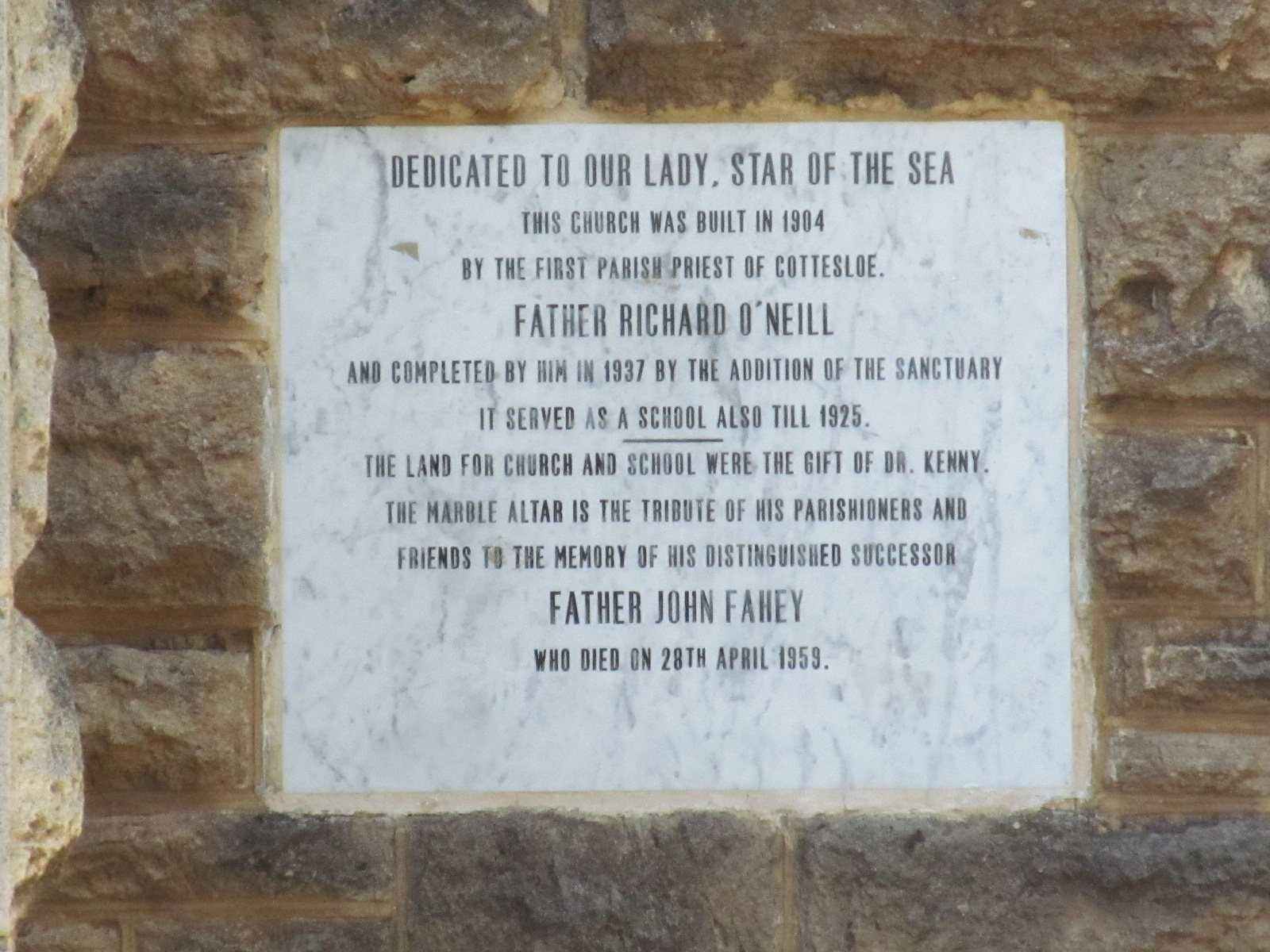
Plaque

== History ==
The church building was built in 1904 on land donated by Daniel Kenny (1860–1915). It was designed by Australian architect Michael Cavanagh (1860–1941) in the Gothic Revival style. The wrought iron fence and entrance gate, also designed by Michael Cavanagh, were added in 1937. It is made of local freestone and tiles from Marseille in France. It cost nearly £2,000 to build, equivalent to A$352,000 in 2022.

It was the second place of worship built in Peppermint Grove after St Columba's Presbyterian Church Hall, which was built on Venn Street in 1896 and later replaced by St Columba's Presbyterian Church on the corner of Venn and Keane Streets. The first service took place on 18 December 1904, when it was blessed by Bishop Matthew Gibney (1835–1925). In the beginning, the church building was used as a school on weekdays.

The church building was restored in 2013 for $120,000, equivalent to A$147,600 in 2022.

== Clergy ==
As of 13 October 2019, the parish priest is Marcelo Parra.

== Sources ==
- Biddle, Matthew (27 February 2013). "Unexpected Need Drives Cottesloe Fundraising". The Record.
- "Roman Catholic Church at Cottesloe". The West Australian. Vol. 20, no. 5854. Western Australia. 19 December 1904. p. 4 – via National Library of Australia.
