= Fremantle Fire Station =

Hostel, and former fire station building in Fremantle, Western Australia

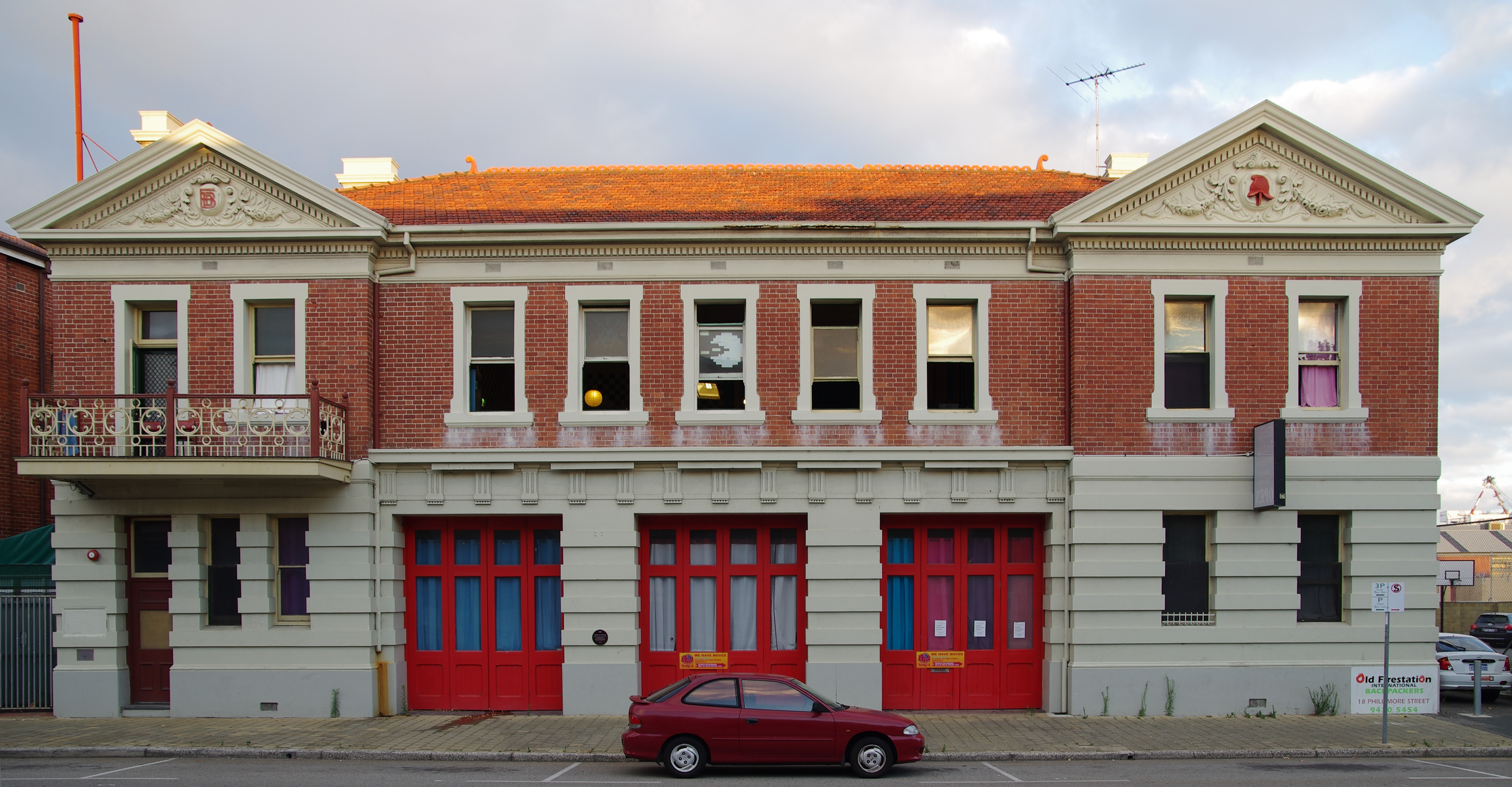
- Interactive map of the Fremantle Fire Station area

General information
- Location: Phillimore Street, Fremantle, Western Australia
- Coordinates: 32°03′15″S 115°44′36″E
- Current tenants: Old Firestation Backpackers
- Completed: 1909
- Client: Fremantle Fire Brigade
- Owner: City of Fremantle

Design and construction
- Architecture firm: Cavanagh and Cavanagh
- Main contractor: J Lake

Western Australia Heritage Register
- Type: State Registered Place
- Designated: 16 November 1993
- Part of: West End, Fremantle (25225)
- Reference no.: 982

Fremantle Fire Station, in Phillimore Street, Fremantle, Western Australia, was the second fire station built for the Fremantle Fire Brigade and was opened in 1909. It was designed by architectural firm Cavanagh and Cavanagh and constructed by J. Lake. The fire station was designed to house four horse-drawn vehicles, including the district's ambulance, which was also operated by the fire brigade. During World War II the building was taken over by the US military for use as Marine quarters.

In the early 1970s the accommodation at the fire station was inadequate and the Fire Brigade Board wanted to demolish the building, to allow the building of a larger station suitable for vehicles. This proposal was met with opposition from The Fremantle Society and the Fremantle Council. In 1975 the Fire Brigade built a new building on railway land next door, and in 1977 the old building vested in the City of Fremantle.

The building is listed on the Register of the National Estate.
