= Oblate Youth Australia =

Australian Catholic youth network

Logo of Oblate Youth Australia

Oblate Youth Australia (OYA) is a network of Catholic youth who identify with a particular Charism of the Religious order of The Missionary Oblates of Mary Immaculate. Created in 2000 by Fr. Christian Fini at St. John Vianney's Parish, the community has grown into a national group, gathering yearly at the National Oblate Youth Encounter and participating in a variety of youth ministry events within Australia and across the world.

== History ==
Created by Fr Christian Fini in mid 2000 after spending time in Italy on his pastoral year of learning, OYA was humble in its beginning. The first meeting was held at the Parish of St John Vianney in Mulgrave, Victoria, Melbourne. The group focused on the coming Sunday's gospel in reflection and prayer. As time went on the group went on a spiritual weekend, which was to be the first Oblate Youth Encounter, held in Dromana. Ten members of the youth group attended this weekend which was to set a series of events in motion. As time went on Fr Christian left Melbourne and travelled to Eaglevale, Sydney. There he resided at the parish of Mary Immaculate. A new youth group was started at that parish with a similar program and scheme. The participants of the youth group in Melbourne was left to its own devices and thrived under their own guidance

With a new location for the Encounter the numbers grew to an astounding 75 participants. This ushered in a new phase of the Oblate Youth Phenomenon.

A new focus has come into sight since World Youth Day 2005 in Cologne where it was announced that the next world youth day would be held in Sydney. As the Oblate Youth community in Australia it became the mission of the community to host a pre-world youth day event for the Oblate Youth of the World. The preparations for this have taken on a new level of involvement. The entire organisation of the event is being achieved by existing members of the community.

== Structure ==
=== Director ===
Fr Christian Fini OMI is the director of Oblate youth Australia. His role as director is one of direction and vision to the entire Oblate Youth community. Where possible he meets with the National Coordinators to work out a broader direction and then with Local (State) Coordinators to make the direction a reality.

=== National Coordinators ===
The National Coordinators of Oblate Youth Australia are Matthew Pilcher, Vanessa Ashokkumar, Hayley Chapman, Tishan Lokuge, Edward Bartels and Jason D'Rozario. Their role as National Coordinators is to implement the national direction and vision of Oblate Youth Australia, providing opportunities for the local Oblate communities to gather as a national community and to support local communities in their youth ministry.

=== Project Officer ===
The Project Officer for Oblate Youth Australia is Emma Rice. They work together with the Director and the National Coordinators to fulfil the vision of Oblate Youth Australia.

=== Oblateyouth.com ===
Launched on the first of March 2003 the Oblate Youth Australia website is a place for the youth who associate with the Missionary Oblates of Mary Immaculate in Australia to meet and be active on the World Wide Web.

Currently, oblateyouth.com is undergoing a redevelopment, expected to launch in 2018.

== Events ==
=== National 3Oblate Youth Encounter ===
In 2000, a student at St Mary's seminary, none other than Christian Fini, was asked to work with the youth at the parish of Saint John Vianney's Parish in Springvale, Victoria. He established a youth group which became known as Youth Coming Together. Inspired by his recent travels to Italy, Christian Fini worked on a number of missions and youth camps. Following this experience, Christian took a small group of twelve young people away on a three-day camp in Dromana, Victoria.

In 2001, Father Christian was ordained and sent to work in Mary Immaculate Parish, Sydney, where he established another similar youth group. With the help of Loretta Brinkman from Sydney, and Daniel Kelly from Melbourne, Father Christian organized yet another end of year camp involving the youth from the two parishes. The 2001 camp had now increased to 26 young people with youth attending from St John Vianneys, Victoria and from Mary Immaculate Parish, Sefton and Eaglevale, NSW. This experience, known again as Youth Coming Together was held in Gerroa, NSW.

The success of the camp in 2001 meant that Youth Coming Together Camp in 2002, had now increased to 40 youth attending with a further two Oblate parishes joining the experience. These two oblate parishes being Immaculate Conception, Sunshine, Victoria and Saint David's, Tea Tree Gully, South Australia. Unbeknown to the group, this would be the last camp held at Gerroa as the group would grow so large it was time to move to a different location.

In 2003, the difficult and risky decision to move the camp location up the mountains ofo Fitzroy Falls, NSW, proved to be the right one. With 70 young people and 4 Oblates now attending, a move of location proved to benefit the group of such a large size. From this time on, this camp was now called the National Oblate Youth Encounter.

The news spread rapidly throughout the Oblate world, in 2004 over 100 youth attended the National Oblate Youth Encounter held once again in Fitzroy Falls, NSW. Students from Iona College in Queensland joined this encounter, as well as members from Rosies located in Brisbane. Another Oblate group in Fremantle, Western Australia joined, again adding to this National experience.

The next National Oblate Youth Encounter would bring forth some changes. A decision was made to move the camps to the start of the scholastic year, in January, as it became difficult for some youth to attend the camps on the previous date of December due to school commitments. The 2006 Encounter was moved down south to the Gippsland area of Victoria, where the camp facilities were appropriate for a growing group of young people, and it was a lot closer to Oblate Youth Central (located in Saint Mary's Seminary, Mulgrave, Victoria). Following World Youth Day in 2005, a larger interest in the National Oblate Youth Encounter was recorded, with at least 120 young people attended with the Coonawarra Farm Resort bursting at the seams in 2006. Students from Mazenod College, Victoria, attended this year following the hype of World Youth Day. Again, a new batch of students from Iona College, Brisbane, attended, with two of these returning again from the previous year. There were also a number of Mazenod College students from Western Australia attending, along with the Oblate Youth members attending from the Fremantle parish. There were record numbers attending from the South Australia, Victoria and New South Wales Oblate parishes as usual, with at least 20 from each state attending.

The most recent camp held again at the Coonawarra Farm Resort, was much the same size as the year previous, but heading in a different direction. Father Christian, still heavily involved with the group, announced the theme of this year's Encounter as "ACT1V8 The Power", referring to the bible verse Acts 1:8 – "You will receive power when the Holy Spirit has come upon you, and you will be my witnesses". This bible verse directly links to the International Oblate Youth Encounter's theme of "Witness to the World", which will be held in Melbourne, 2008, leading up to World Youth Day. This camp conveyed a powerful message to the young people this year, to ACT1V8 their own power, in whichever talent they have, to assist in hosting an International Oblate Youth Encounter in 2008.

=== International Oblate Youth Encounter ===
Preceding the celebrations of World Youth Day 2008 in Sydney, the first International Oblate Youth Encounter will be held on 9–12 July 2008, in Melbourne, Australia.
