= Brass Monkey Hotel =

Bar in Perth, Western Australia

- The Brass Monkey

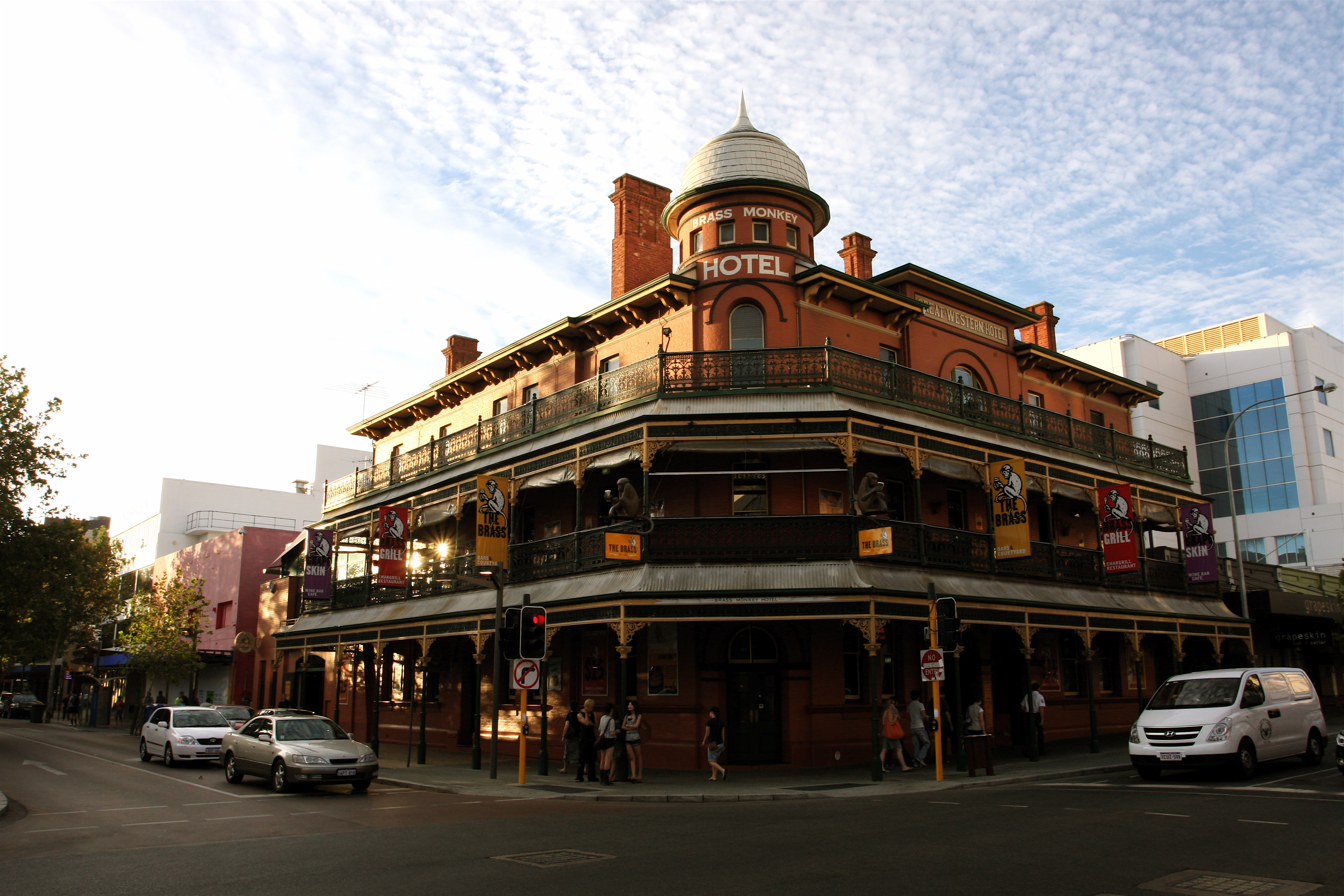
- Front of building from across intersection
- Interactive map of Brass Monkey Hotel
- Address: Intersection of William and James streets, Northbridge; Perth; Australia
- Coordinates: 31.948812°S 115.859237°E
- Type: Bar, music venue

Website
- www.thebrassmonkey.com.au

The Brass Monkey Hotel is a pub located at the intersection of James and William streets in Northbridge, a suburb of Perth in Western Australia.

== Description ==
The venue consists of three storeys and a part basement. It is a brick and iron building, at the north-west corner of the intersection of William and James streets. It has verandahs on all floors, with decorative metal filigree. Much of its original features from its 1896 construction have been retained, including its stained glass windows, timber staircases and joinery.

The venue contains a function space, an upstairs bar, and a balcony. The neighbouring Patriots Sports Bar is connected to the venue. The original accommodation spaces are still on the second floor, and are used as administrative and staff spaces.

In its early 20th century period, the bar contained "a large billiard room, a magnificent saloon, and front bar, the fittings of which are equal to anything in the city, where patrons are served with courtesy and despatch."

== History and operations ==
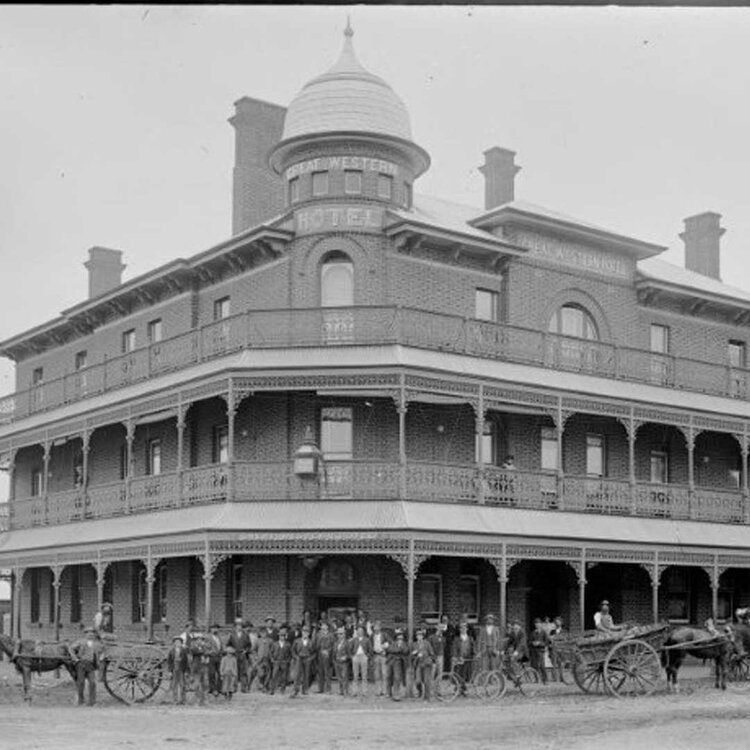
The Great Western Hotel (1900)

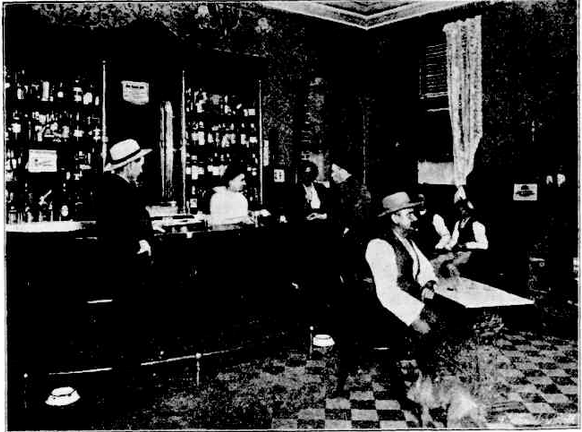
Saloon bar, 1906

The hotel was built on a plot of valuable, strategically located land owned by Mrs Davies, a widow. She commissioned Michael Cavanagh to design a three-story hotel for the site. Its design is now regarded as an example of the Federation Filigree style. It was one of the more lavish hotels constructed in Perth during the gold boom period.

The venue was constructed in 1896 and initially named the Great Western Hotel. Its first publican was Myer Rosenweig. By 1899 the licensee was with Mr George West, an altercation that year made local headlines after he was charged with obstructing police from arresting patrons. In 1906 it was in the hands of Mr Chas Brewer, and in 1907 in the hands of Mr Bert Porter.

In 1913 the venue was acquired by George H Kentish, a well-known publican of the Goldfields who had previously managed the Tivoli, Oriental, and Shamrock hotels in Kalgoorlie. In its early days the venue was renowned as a "free house" (that is, not tied by contract to selling any particular brand of liquor).

The venue appears multiple times in newspaper records in matters including lawsuits over staff pay disputes, violent disturbances, foul language, brawls, pickpocketing, and robberies.

=== Modern period ===
The venue was significantly refurbished in 1988–1989, and was renamed the Brass Monkey. In 2007 the venue was purchased by Ale Property Group.

The venue has continued to be a source of local headlines for disturbances, and announced a change in style in 2022, stating that it would be attempting to operate as an ordinary worker's pub, rather than as a nightclub.

== Reception ==
Decisions of the hotel's management have resulted in public criticism and attention in local headlines: an Anzac Day event in 2017 was described as "disgusting" and "tasteless", and in 2016 the venue was criticised for displaying sexist banners in promotion of a fraternity themed party being hosted, for which it subsequently apologised.

== See also ==
- Court Hotel
- Federal Hotel
- Raffles Hotel
- Rosemount Hotel
- Royal Hotel
