= Missionary Oblates of Mary Immaculate =

Catholic missionary order

- Missionariorum Oblatorum Beatae Mariae Virginis Immaculatae
- Abbreviation: Post-nominal letters OMI
- Established: 25 January 1816; 210 years ago
- Founder: Charles Joseph Eugène de Mazenod
- Founded at: Aix-en-Provence, France
- Type: Clerical Religious Congregation of Pontifical Right (for Men)
- Headquarters: General House, Via Aurelia 290 Rome, Italy
- Region served: Worldwide 2020
- Members: 3,786 (2,741 priests) (2020)
- Superior General: Luis Ignacio Rois Alonso
- Affiliations: Roman Catholic Church
- Website: OMI
- Remarks: Motto: Latin: Evangelizare pauperibus misit me. Pauperes evangelizantur(English: 'He has sent me to bring the Good News to the poor. The poor have received the Good News.'); Mission: To bring the Good News of Christ to the Poor; Ministry: Parochial, foreign mission, educational work
- Formerly called: Missionaries of Provence

The Missionary Oblates of Mary Immaculate (OMI) (Note: An oblate is a person dedicated to God or God's service.) is a missionary religious congregation in the Catholic Church. It was founded on January 25, 1816, by Eugène de Mazenod, a French priest later recognized as a Catholic saint. The congregation was given recognition by Pope Leo XII on February 17, 1826. As of January 2020, the congregation was composed of 3,631 priests and lay brothers usually living in community. Their traditional salutation is Laudetur Iesus Christus ('Praised be Jesus Christ'), to which the response is Et Maria Immaculata ('And Mary Immaculate'). Members use the post-nominal letters "OMI".

As part of its mission to evangelize the "abandoned poor", OMI are known for their mission among the Indigenous peoples of Canada, and their historic administration of at least 57 schools within the Canadian Indian residential school system. Some of those schools have been associated with cases of child abuse by Oblate clergy and staff.

== Foundation ==
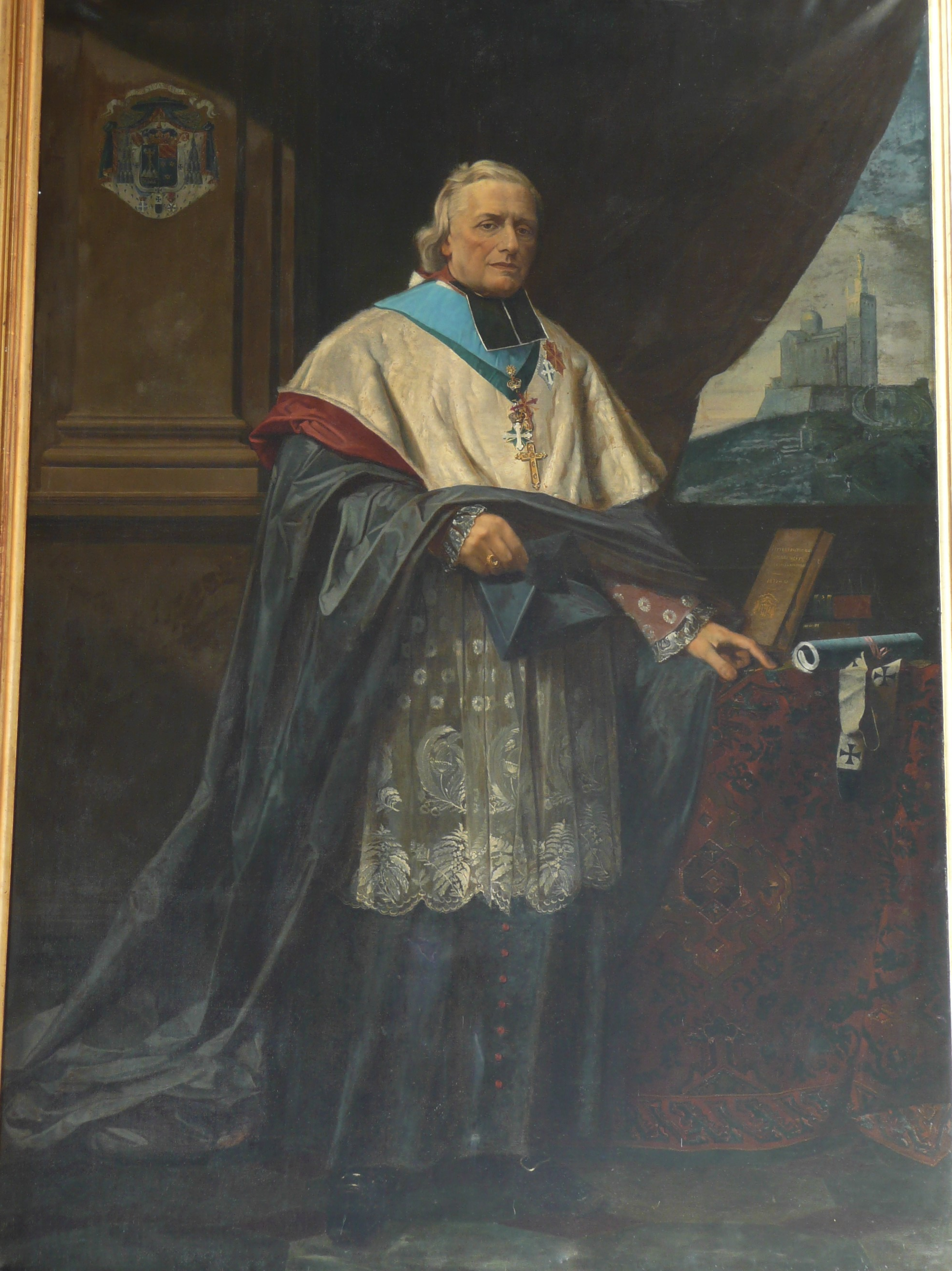
St. Eugène de Mazenod

The "Society of Missionaries of Provence" was founded on January 25, 1816, in Aix-en-Provence when Eugene de Mazenod and four companions came together to preach, first with missions in the Provençal dialect, speaking the everyday language of the community.

Born into French nobility in 1782, Eugene de Mazenod fled the French Revolution with his family in 1789. In 1798 in Naples, they were joined by his uncle, the future Bishop Fortuné de Mazenod. Returning to France in 1802, he entered the Seminary of St. Sulpice and was ordained in 1811.

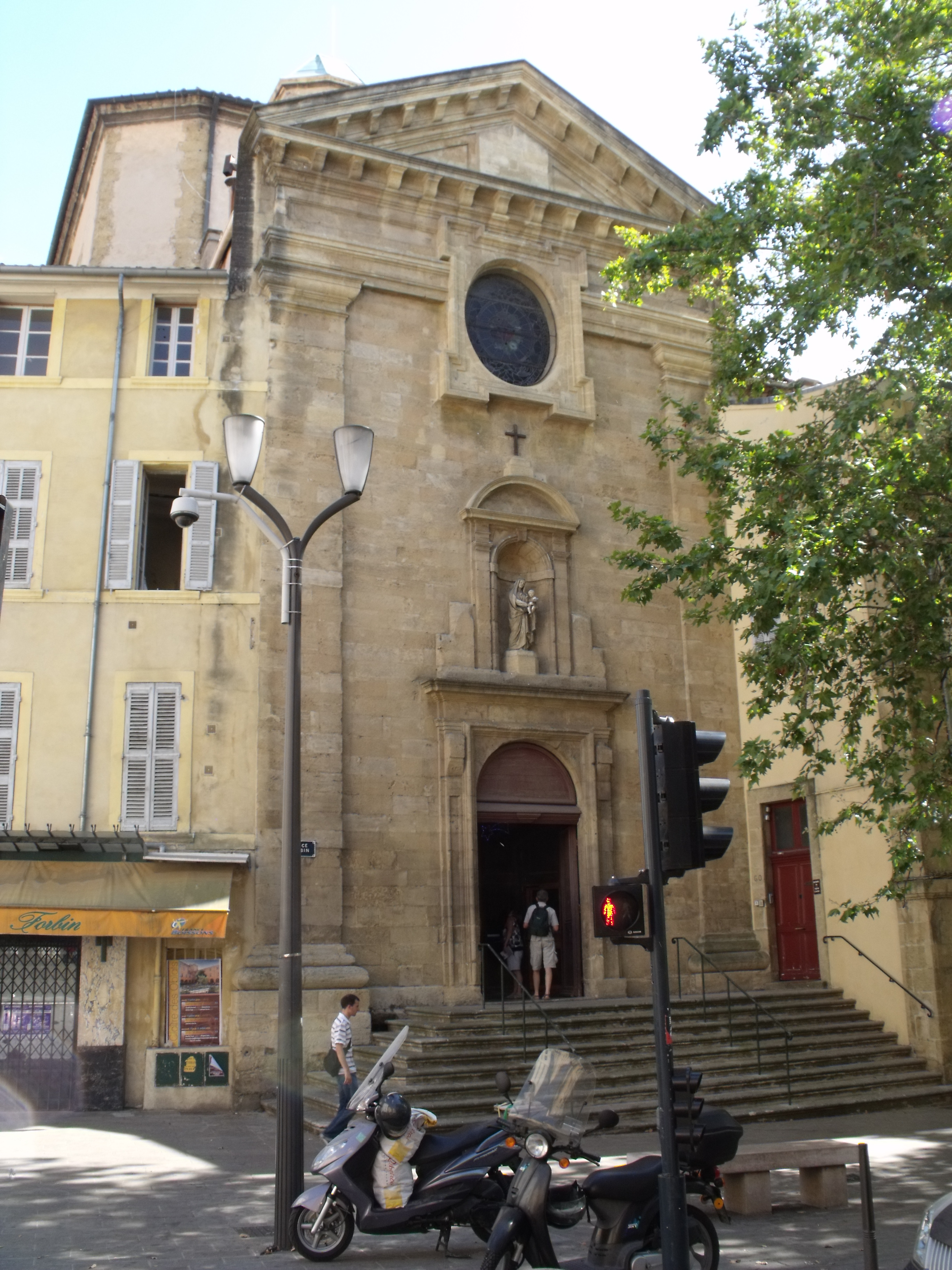
Chapelle des Oblats (Aix-en-Provence)

The character of de Mazenod's experience during the French Revolution formed his society's goals. Initially established to renew the Roman Catholic Church in France, the society opposed Napoleon's view of the Church, and focused its mission on the masses, believed to have abandoned the Church.

On 25 January 1816, Mazenod invited other priests to join him in his life of total oblation to God and to the most abandoned of Provence. Initially called "Missionaries of Provence," they dedicated themselves to evangelization through preaching parish missions in the poor villages, youth and prison ministry. In 1818 a second community was established at the Marian shrine of Notre Dame du Laus. This became the occasion for the missionaries to become a religious congregation, united through vows and the evangelical counsels.

On February 17, 1826, Pope Leo XII granted approbation of pontifical right to the congregation of the "Missionary Oblates of the Most Holy and Immaculate Virgin Mary" via papal brief.

Pope Pius XI (1857–1939) was so impressed by the courage of the Oblates that he referred to them as "specialists in the most difficult missions of the Church."

=== Charism ===
Missionaries first, OMI's decree, confirmed in 1982, is that they are "devoted principally to the evangelization of the poor", and their charism specifically aimed at people "whose condition cries out for salvation".

We fulfil our task in healing the world by understanding its evolutionary character, by critically engaging its contemporary spirit, and by meeting its new needs in new ways...With Gospel values we dialogue with peoples of different cultures, faiths, and religions, in the search for an integral transformation of society; we work with others to safeguard human dignity, nurture family, foster harmony, promote a culture of peace, and respond to the calls of justice and integrity of creation.

=== Rule and constitution ===
Eugene de Mazenod's initial text of the congregation's rule and constitution as approved by the Vatican has been modified both by himself, and subsequent meetings of the General Chapter.

We must lead men to act like human beings, first of all, and then like Christians, and, finally, we must help them to become saints.

— Eugene de Mazenod, Rule of 1818

=== Religious formation ===
Initially, those interested in joining the congregation have several meetings with an OMI priest, usually with visits to an Oblate community. Men aged 18 and over meet regularly to share their experiences of God and what God may be calling them to become, and the congregation shares what it is like to be a member. Potential members are encouraged to regularly attend Mass, read the Bible—especially the Gospel—and pray to discern their vocation.

==== Vows ====
As members of a religious congregation, Oblates embrace the evangelical counsels, taking three traditional religious vows of poverty, chastity, and obedience. Poverty means that all possessions are held in common and that no member may accumulate wealth. Chastity, abstaining from sexual activity, is intended to make the religious totally available for religious service. Additionally, Oblates vow "perseverance until death" as a sign of their commitment to the OMI mission of evangelism.

==== Postulancy/pre-novitiate ====
This is a 1-2-year experience of living in an OMI community, sharing in many aspects of the life of the congregation. During this time, the postulants participate in the prayer life of a community, share more deeply with others, and become involved in one or more of the congregation's apostolates. Essentially, it is an extended period of discernment for the postulants and an opportunity for the congregation to assess the strengths of the candidates and possible areas requiring growth. For those straight out of high school it is possible, in some provinces, to begin working on an undergraduate degree.

==== Novitiate ====
Next follows the novitiate which is the time for preparing to take the vows of poverty, chastity, and obedience. The novices are given the opportunity for longer periods of prayer and spiritual reading as well as silence in order to reflect on the vocation God is offering and nature of their response. The spiritual development of the novice is of particular focus, especially through spiritual direction. During the novitiate, the history and Constitutions of the Congregation are studied in depth. A simple profession is made at the end of the novitiate and the person officially becomes a member of the Congregation.

==== Post-novitiate/scholasticate ====
After the novitiate, the new members of the congregation continue their studies. In the Philippines this normally involves a 4-year theology degree, followed by a missionary year abroad, although a student may make a request to study at the Pontifical Gregorian University in Rome. The theologate in the United States is takes place in San Antonio, Texas, at Oblate School of Theology. In Canada, studies are undertaken at Saint Paul University in Ottawa, Ontario. Scholastics from four provinces in Southern Africa (Central, Lesotho, Natal, and Northern) study at the congregation's scholasticate in the small town of Hilton in KwaZulu-Natal or at the international scholasticate in Rome.

Vows are renewed annually; after three years a member may request final vows. According to canon law, temporary vows may be renewed for a longer period but not exceeding nine years.

=== The General Chapter ===
OMI conducts a General Chapter, or assembly, of its membership every six years. The assembly may take a month. Held in Rome, the assembly is the highest governing body of the OMI outside of the Holy See, and includes capitular fathers and representatives from OMI provinces worldwide. Called by the Superior General, the assembly determines mission strategy, policies and rules, organizational change, consults on emerging topics, and conducts elections of their administration. Crucially, the assembly also discusses spiritual concerns of their religious formation, community, identity, sets contemplative goals, and affirms its charism.

In October 2016, the General Chapter celebrated OMI's 200th year. The assembly focused on its mission and their motto: "Evangelizare pauperibus misit me. Pauperes evangelizantur—He has sent me to bring the Good News to the poor. The poor have received the Good News." Incumbent Superior General, Louie Lougen was re-elected to his post, as was incumbent Vicar General Paolo Archiati.

==== 37th General Chapter ====
In October 2022, the 37th General Chapter was called. The assembly focused on the theme of "Pilgrims of Hope in Communion." Luis Ignacio Rois Alonso was elected to the post of Superior General.

== Notable oblates ==
Members of the congregation have served in prominent clerical positions, including a number of cardinals, such as Thomas Cooray and Francis George. OMI candidates for sainthood include Józef Cebula, who died in Mauthausen concentration camp, and Joseph Gérard, a missionary to South Africa.

== Locations ==
The Oblates are active worldwide. They work in parishes, Catholic schools, retreat centres, and among Indigenous peoples, emphasizing issues of justice and peace.

=== Australia ===
Begun in 1894, OMI's Australian presence is currently administered in one geographic province based in Camberwell, Victoria and includes nine parishes and four schools. As of 2017, there were 42 Oblate priests working in Australia. Australia also administers OMI's delegation to China and Hong Kong.

- Iona College, Brisbane
- Mazenod College, Victoria
- Mazenod College, Western Australia
- St Eugene College, Brisbane, Queensland

=== Brazil ===
- The Escola Maria Imaculada (Chapel School) in São Paulo, Brazil, was founded in 1947 under the mandate issued by the OMI and is currently administered by laymen.

=== Canada ===
The Oblates are known for their mission among the Indigenous peoples of Canada, and their historic administration of at least 57 schools within the Canadian Indian residential school system. Some of those schools have been associated with cases of child abuse by Oblate clergy and staff.

=== Democratic Republic of the Congo ===
- Université De Mazenod, Kinshasa

=== France ===
The ancient sanctuary of St. Martin of Tours was re-excavated and revived by Oblate Fathers under Cardinal Joseph-Hippolyte Guibert in 1862.

The Oblates maintain a presence at a number of shrines to the Virgin Mary, including Lourdes and Notre-Dame de Pontmain.

=== Hong Kong ===
- St. Alfred's Church, Sha Tin
- Notre Dame College, Kowloon
- Primary School, Kowloon
- St Eugene de Mazenod Oblate Primary School, Kowloon
- Po Yan Oblate Primary School, Kowloon

=== Italy ===
The Oblates maintain a presence at a number of shrines to the Virgin Mary, including Loreto, Italy.

=== Mexico ===
- The Colegio Vista Hermosa in Mexico City and several missions in the area of Oaxaca.

=== Nigeria ===
- College De Mazenod Kihang, Bassa - Jos

=== Philippines ===
- Notre Dame University, Cotabato City
- Notre Dame of Midsayap College, North Cotabato
- Notre Dame of Greater Manila, Caloocan
- Notre Dame of Jolo College, Jolo, Sulu

=== Sri Lanka ===
Arriving in 1847, Oblates landed in Galle, British Ceylon. OMI's Sri Lankan mission is currently administered as Colombo Province and Jaffna Province. As of June 2021, there were 106 Oblates attached to Colombo's seven districts. Colombo also administers OMI's delegations to Japan, Korea, Bangladesh, and Pakistan.

=== South Africa ===
- St. Joseph's Theological Institute, Cedara

=== United Kingdom and Ireland ===
In the UK and Ireland, the Oblates work through parishes and Centres of Mission in London, Edinburgh, Anglesey, Offaly and Dublin.

=== United States ===
- The Tekakwitha Indian Orphanage in Sisseton, South Dakota. The school was later closed in the 1970s and demolished by the tribe in 2010
- The Oblate School of Theology, Our Lady of Lourdes Grotto & Tepeyac de San Antonio, in San Antonio, Texas,
- Formerly, they ran a seminary in Pass Christian, Mississippi.
- The National Shrine of Our Lady of the Snows in Belleville, Illinois, along with its nearby retreat centre, King's House.
- St. Joseph the Worker Shrine, in Lowell, Massachusetts

Zambia

- Our Lady of Assumption Parish, Mazabuka, Southern Province, Zambia.

== See also ==
- Oblate Youth Australia
- Notre Dame Broadcasting Corporation, a broadcasting network managed by the Philippine branch of the Oblates
- Cavalry of Christ
