= List of sites on the Queensland Heritage Register in Toowoomba =

There are a number of sites on the Queensland Heritage Register in Toowoomba, Queensland, Australia. These include:

- 24 Anzac Avenue, Newtown: Elphin (residence)
- 57 Brook Street, North Toowoomba: The Downs Co-operative Dairy Association Limited Factory

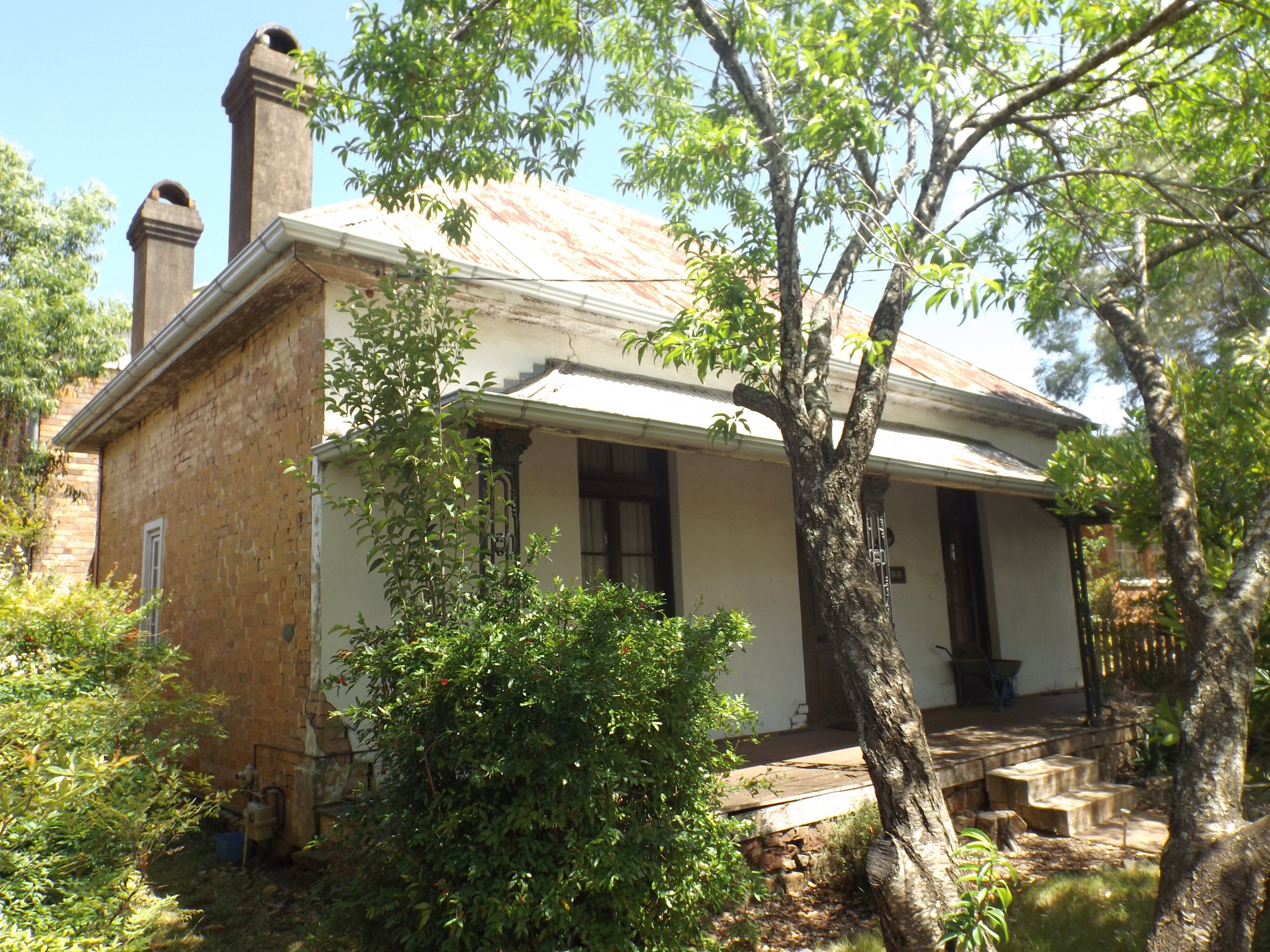
Tawa, 2014

- 9 Boulton Street, Toowoomba City: Tawa
- 80 Campbell Street, East Toowoomba: Whyembah
- 32–36 East Street, Redwood: Glen Alpine
- 4–6 Fernside Street, East Toowoomba: Fernside
- 1B–3 Gladstone Street, Newtown: Gladstone House and Cottage
- Herries Street, Toowoomba City: St Luke's Anglican Church
- 149 Herries Street, Toowoomba City: Soldiers Memorial Hall
- 152 Herries Street, Toowoomba City: St Luke's Church Hall
- 1 Hogg Street, Cranley: Baillie Henderson Hospital

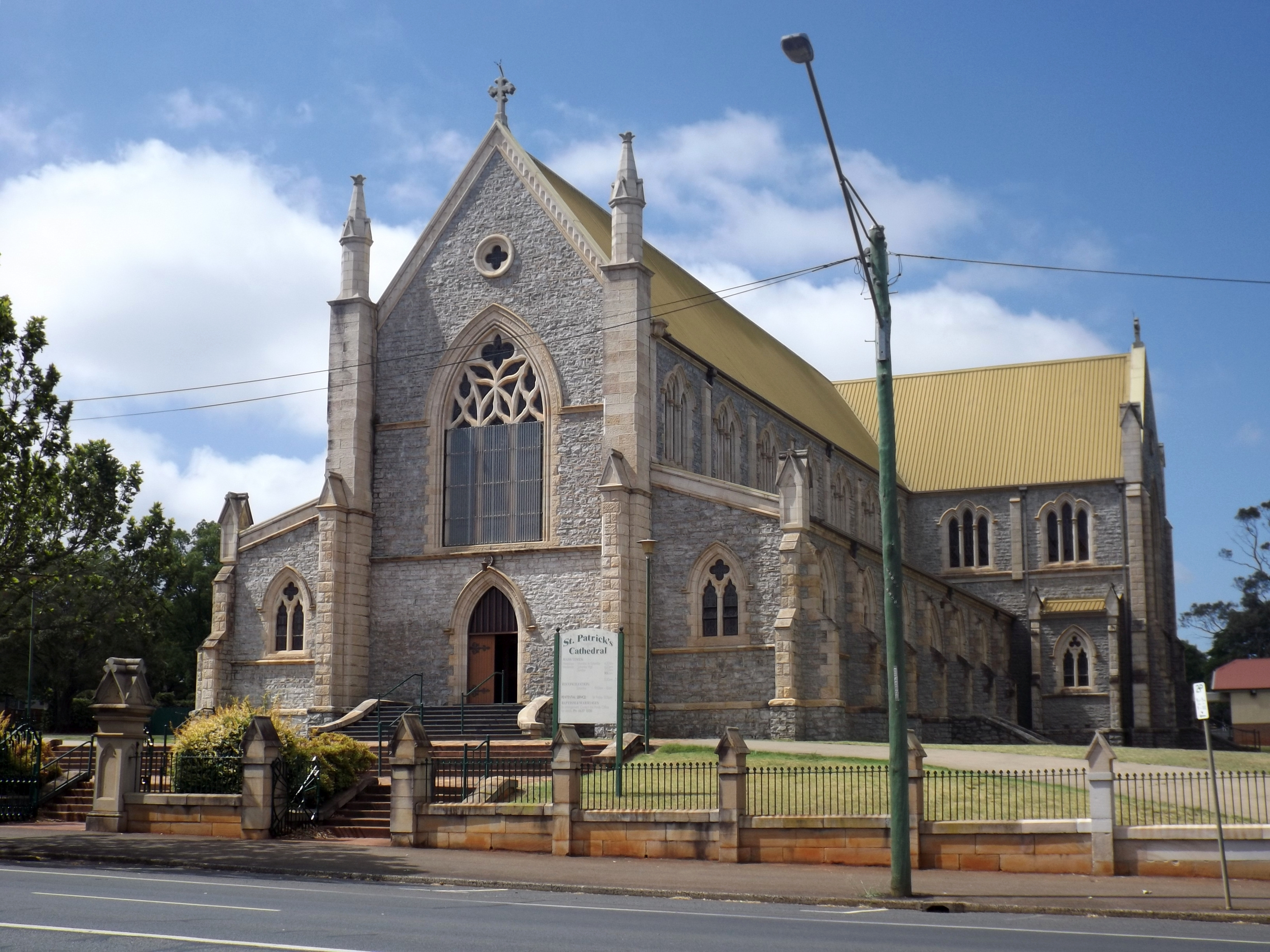
St Patrick's Cathedral, Toowoomba, 2014

- James Street, South Toowoomba: St Patricks Cathedral
- 158 James Street, South Toowoomba: Toowoomba South State School
- 43–79 Lindsay Street, East Toowoomba: Queens Park
- 24–60 Margaret Street, East Toowoomba: Toowoomba Grammar School
- 73 Margaret Street, East Toowoomba: Bishop's House
- 90 Margaret Street, East Toowoomba: Old Toowoomba Court House
- 124 Margaret Street, East Toowoomba: Toowoomba Technical College
- 136 Margaret Street, Toowoomba City: Toowoomba Post Office
- 159–167 Margaret Street, Toowoomba City: Strand Theatre
- 245–253 Margaret Street, Toowoomba City: Exchange Building
- 112 Mary Street, East Toowoomba: Gowrie House

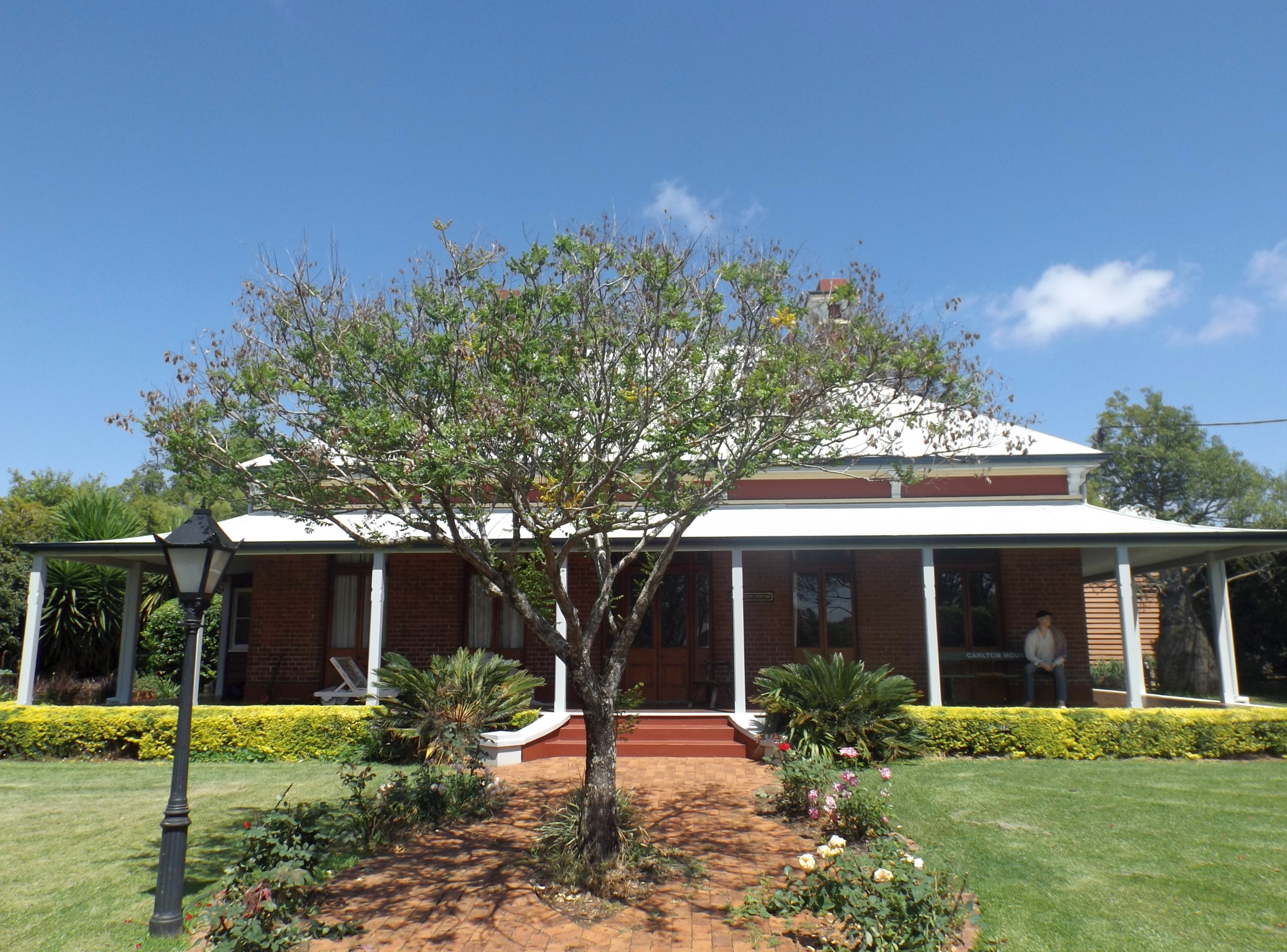
Carlton House, 2014

- 3 Mill Street, Toowoomba City: Carlton House
- 11 Mort Street, Newtown: Toowoomba Maltings
- 145 Mort Street, Toowoomba City: St James Church
- 6 Munro Street, Harlaxton: Harlaxton House
- 15 Mylne Street (27.5599°S 151.9491°E): The Downs Club
- 46 Neil Street, Toowoomba City: Toowoomba Court House
- 50–52 Neil Street, Toowoomba City: Toowoomba Police Station Complex
- 54 Neil Street, Toowoomba City: Wesley Uniting Church
- 56 & 56A Neil Street, Toowoomba City: Empire Theatre
- 15 Newmarket Street, Newtown: Ascot House
- 8 Panda Street, Harristown: Smithfield House
- Pechey Street, South Toowoomba: Toowoomba Hospital
- 9 Phillip Street, East Toowoomba: Millbrook
- 344–376 Ramsay Street, Middle Ridge: Gabbinbar
- 6 Range Street, Mount Lofty: Boyce Gardens
- Russell Street, Toowoomba City: Men's Toilet

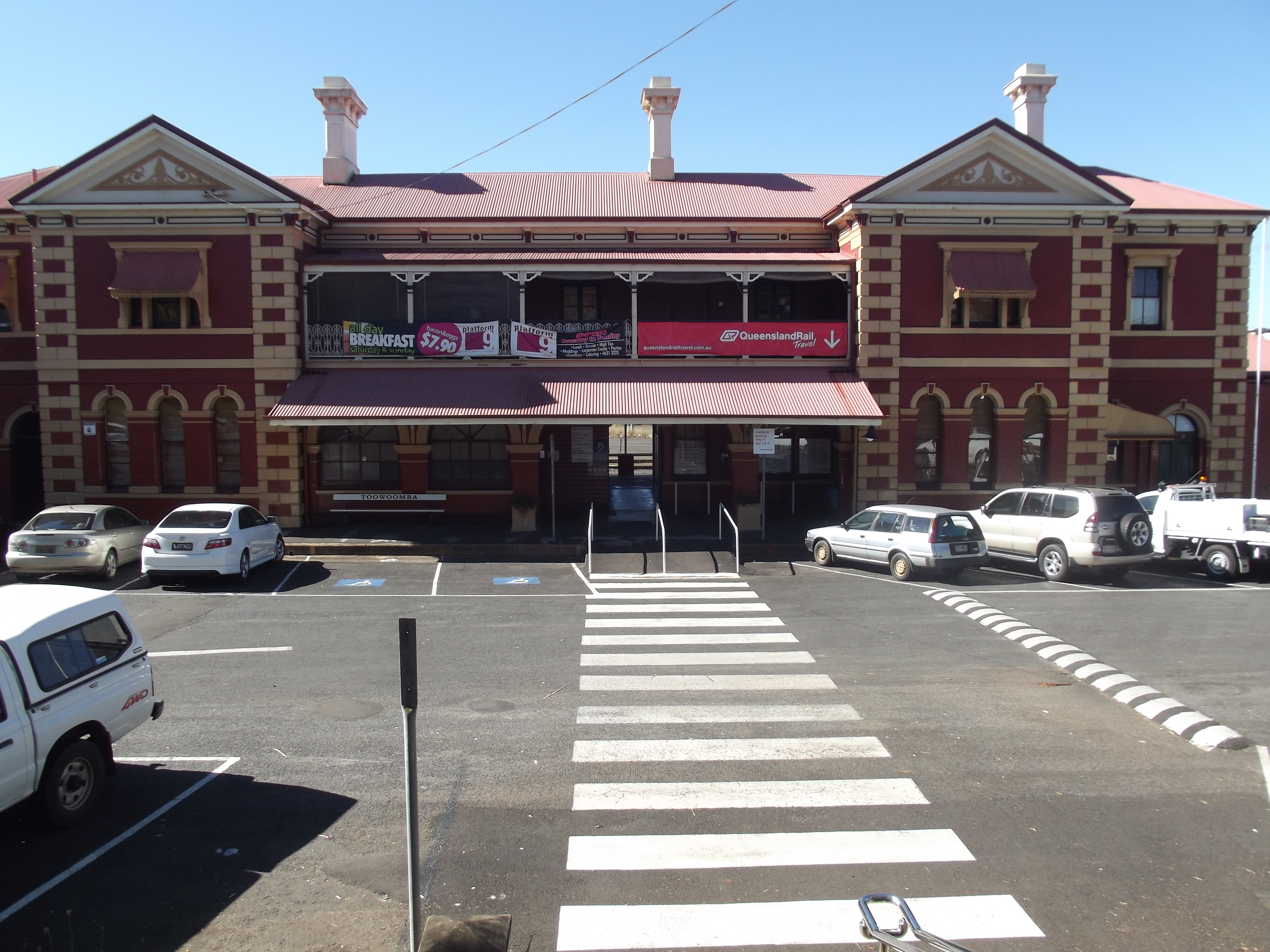
Toowoomba railway station, 2013

- Russell Street, Toowoomba City: Toowoomba railway station
- 2 Russell Street, Toowoomba City: Toowoomba Permanent Building Society
- 19A Russell Street, Toowoomba City: Toowoomba Trades Hall
- 112 Russell Street, Toowoomba City: St James Parish Hall
- 120 Russell Street, Toowoomba City: Clifford House
- 126 Russell Street, Toowoomba City: Kensington
- 127 Russell Street, Toowoomba City: Wislet

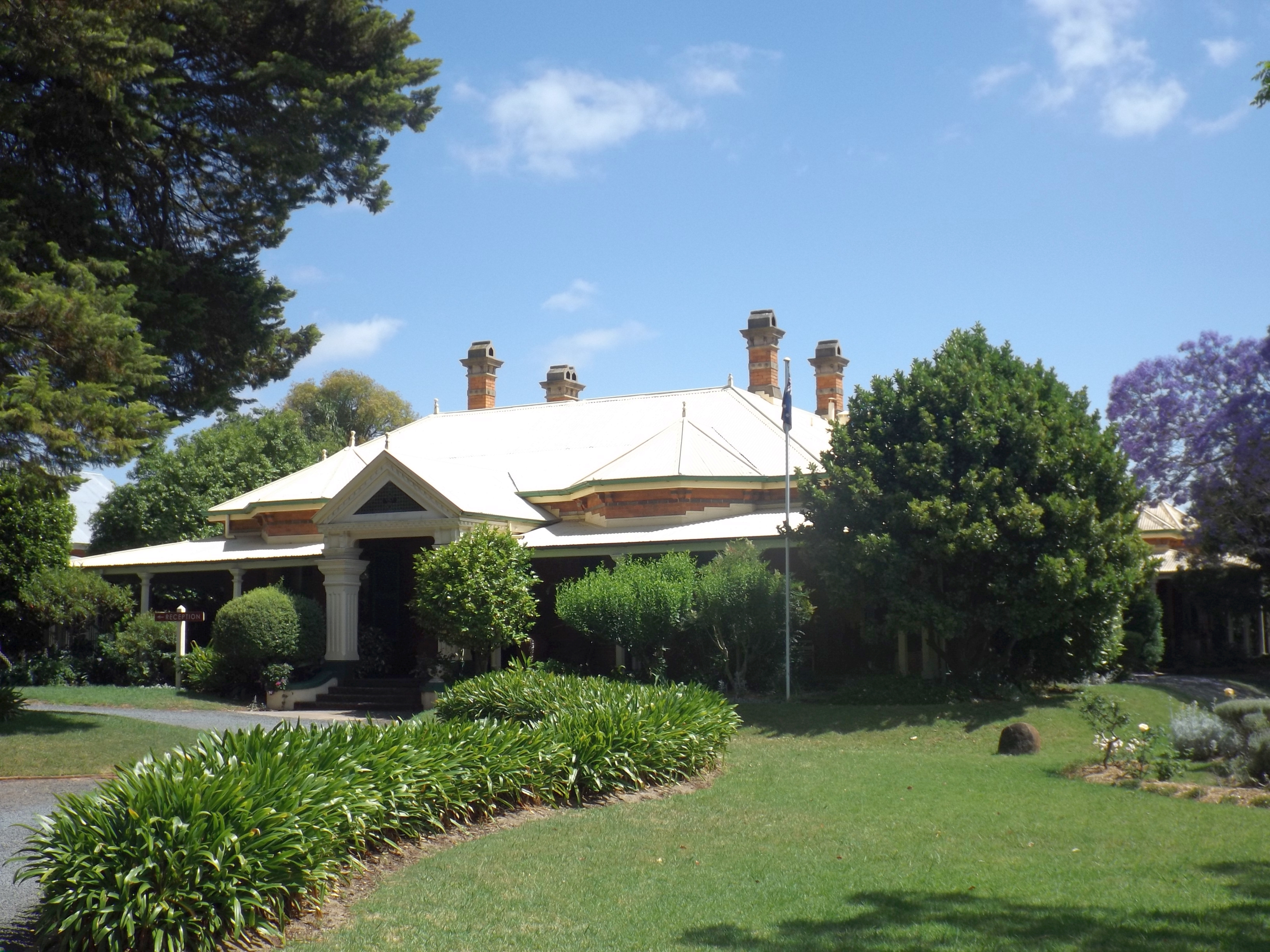
Vacy Hall, 2014

- 135 Russell Street, Toowoomba City: Vacy Hall

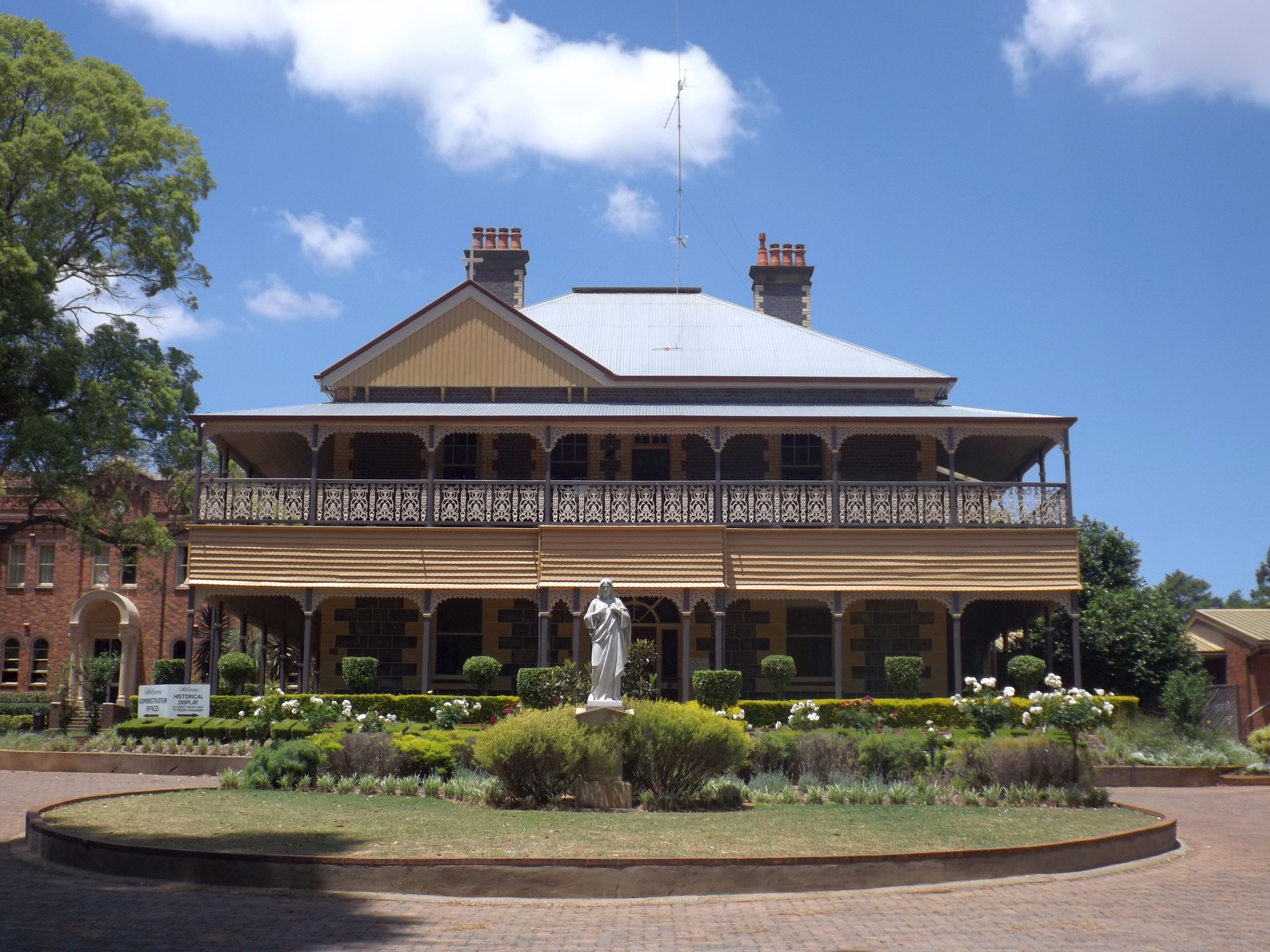
Tyson Manor, 2014

- Ruthven Street, Harlaxton: Tyson Manor
- 251–267 Ruthven Street, Toowoomba City: Toowoomba Foundry
- 269–291 Ruthven Street, Toowoomba City: Defiance Flour Mill
- 381–391 Ruthven Street, Toowoomba City: Pigott's Building
- 386–388 Ruthven Street, Toowoomba City: Karingal Chambers
- 451–455 Ruthven Street, Toowoomba City: Alexandra Building
- 456 Ruthven Street, Toowoomba City: White Horse Hotel
- 541 Ruthven Street, Toowoomba City: Toowoomba City Hall
- corner of South Street and Anzac Avenue, Harristown: Drayton and Toowoomba Cemetery
- 1 South Street, Rangeville: Geeumbi
- 2 South Street, Rangeville: Rodway (house)
- 68 Stephen Street, South Toowoomba: Cottage
- 154 Stephen Street, Harristown: Redlands
- 396 Tor Street, Newtown: Tor
- 427 Tor Street, Newtown: Weetwood
- 9–13 Tourist Road, East Toowoomba: Unara
- 168 Tourist Road, Rangeville: Picnic Point and adjacent Parkland
- 7 Warra Street & 30 Rome Street, Newtown: Oak Lodge and Spreydon

== See also ==
- History of Toowoomba, Queensland
