= History of Toowoomba, Queensland =

The modern history of Toowoomba begins in the 19th century. Europeans began exploring and settling in the area from 1816 on-wards. By the end of the 1840s the rich lands around Toowoomba were being used for agriculture. 12 suburban allotments at Drayton were surveyed in 1849. Small commercial settlements were growing with schools and churches also being built. The first council election took place in 1861 and the telegraph connection to Brisbane was established in 1862. Between 1868 and 1886, several new railway lines from Toowoomba were opened. Throughout the 21st century the city prospered with new hospitals, large industrial buildings and education facilities established. Toowoomba Wellcamp Airport was opened in 2014.

== Name ==
How the name Toowoomba was derived is still a point of argument. There are several theories, including:

- that it derived from the aboriginal word for swamp which is Tawampa as the Aboriginal peoples had no "s" in their language sound system.
- that the aboriginal interpretation for "reeds in the swamp" Woomba Woomba was used as the original source
- that the word Toowoomba was taken from the aboriginal term for a native melon "Toowoom" or "Choowoom" which grew plentifully in the township.

== 1800-1820 ==
In 1816 English botanist and explorer Allan Cunningham arrived in Australia from Brazil where he had been collecting botanical specimens for Joseph Banks. He was the first European to visit the land known as Toowoomba today.

== 1820-1840 ==
In June 1827, Cunningham was rewarded for his many explorations when he discovered 4 million acres (16,000 km²) of rich farming and grazing land bordered on the east by the Great Dividing Range and situated 100 miles (160 km) west of the settlement of Moreton Bay (later became Brisbane). Cunningham named his find Darling Downs after Ralph Darling (later Sir Ralph), then Governor of New South Wales.

It was not until 13 years later when George and Patrick Leslie established Toolburra Station 56 miles (90 km) south-west of Toowoomba that the first settlers arrived on the Downs. Other settlers such as Thomas Alford quickly followed and a few tradesmen and businessmen settled and established a township of bark-slab shops called The Springs which was soon renamed Drayton.

== 1840-1860 ==
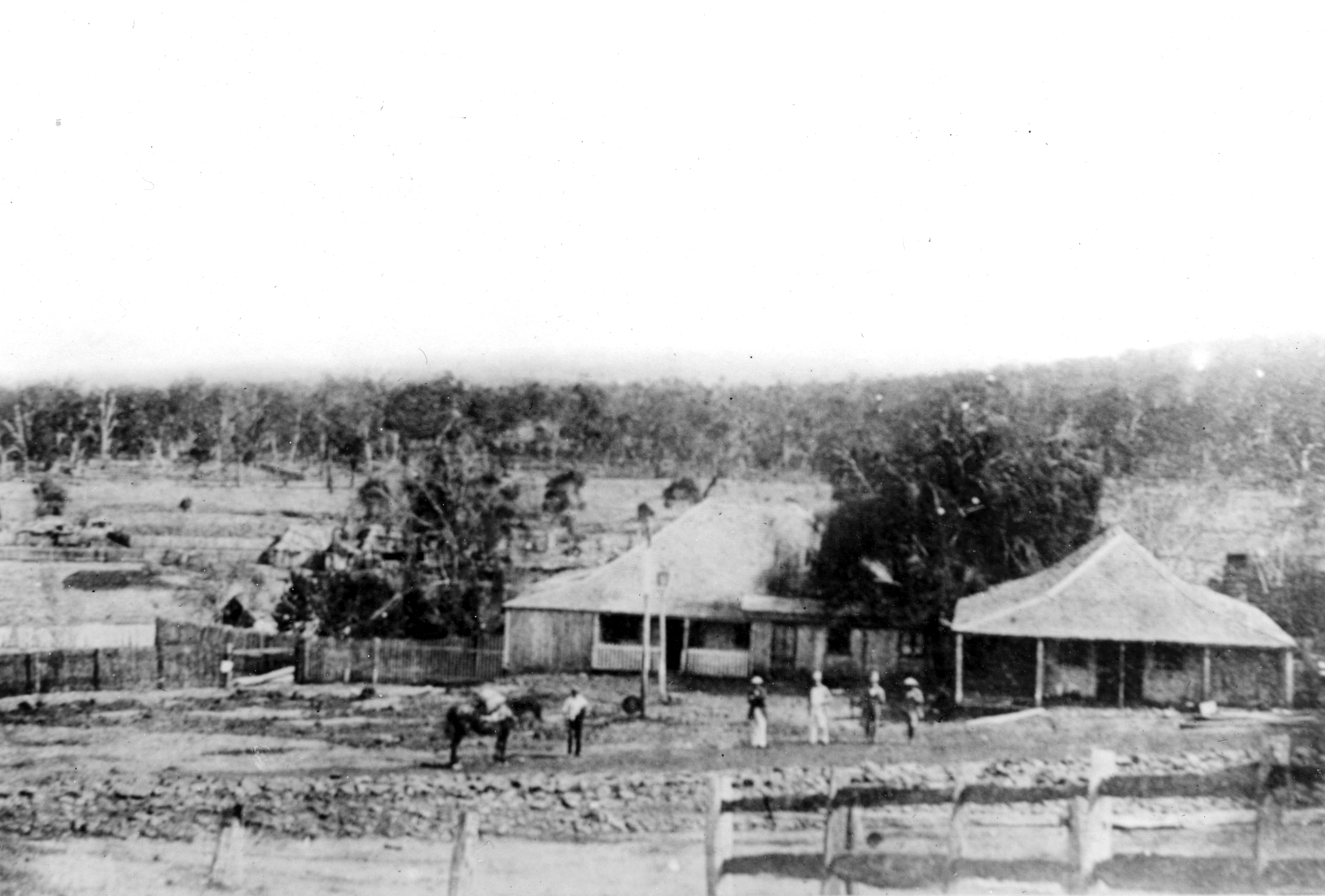
Darling Street Drayton, ~1856

Towards the end of the 1840s，Drayton had grown to the point where it had its own newspaper shop, general store, trading post and the Royal Bull's Head Inn which was built by William Horton and still stands today. Horton is regarded as the real founder of Toowoomba, although he was not the first European to live there.

Early in 1849 Horton sent two of his men, William Gurney and William Shuttlewood, a former convict, to cut away reeds in a marshy swampland area a few miles away that nobody from Drayton ever visited. When Gurney and Shuttlewood, a future Borough Alderman, arrived they were surprised to find a pitched tent among the reeds. The tent's owner was bush worker Josiah Dent who was the first man to live in "The Swamp". This extraordinary news was the main talking point in Drayton for weeks and people became interested in developing The Swamp as useful farming land. Plans were drawn for 12 to 20 acre (49,000 to 81,000 m²) farms in the swamp (later to be drained and become the foundation for the establishment of Toowoomba) in the hope of attracting more people to the area to support the land and build up the town. Two years later people began purchasing the land but not new settlers. The new farm holdings attracted buyers from Drayton.

In 1850 land was selling at £4 an acre (£988/km²). Drovers and wagon masters spread the news of the new settlement at Toowoomba. By 1858 Toowoomba was growing fast. It had a population of 700, three hotels and many stores. Land now £150 an acre (£37,000/km²).

1851 saw the establishment of a National School at Drayton, which later became Drayton State School. On 29 August 1852 the town's only churchman, the Rev. Benjamin Glennie who had lived in Drayton since 1848, christened both children at the Alford home. It was the first Church of England service held in Toowoomba and the first day the word "Toowoomba" was written on a public document.

In 1853 the Queensland Government granted 2 acres (0.81 ha) of Crown land for a Presbyterian church, school and manse on the south-west corner of James Street and Hume Street (27.5695°S 151.9560°E), now in East Toowooomba. In May 1858 tenders were called to erect a raised timber church of 20 by 30 feet (6.1 by 9.1 m). By September 1858 construction had commenced but halted due to insufficient funds to complete the building. In March 1859 the Presbyterian minister at Ipswich, William Lambie Nelson, visited Toowoomba, spending a week successfully collecting funds to finish the church. The church building was finally completed on 11 September 1859 and was used by visiting ministers. It was not until 1863 that the congregation of St Stephen's was officially established when Nelson decided to purchase a farm in Toowoomba (now Gabbinbar) and became the Presbyterian minister at Toowoomba, preaching the first service on 6 December 1863.

== 1860-1880 ==
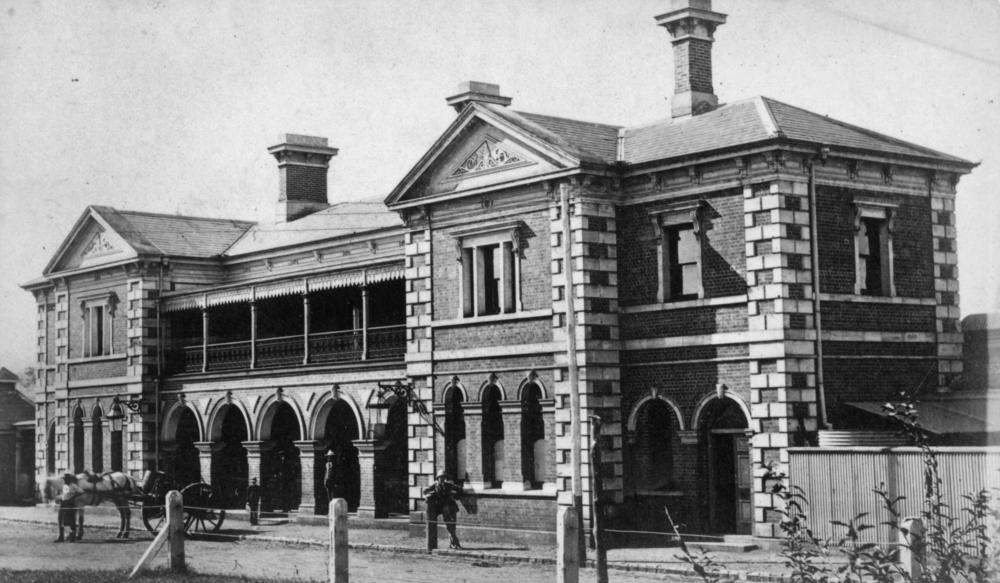
Toowoomba railway station opened in 1867

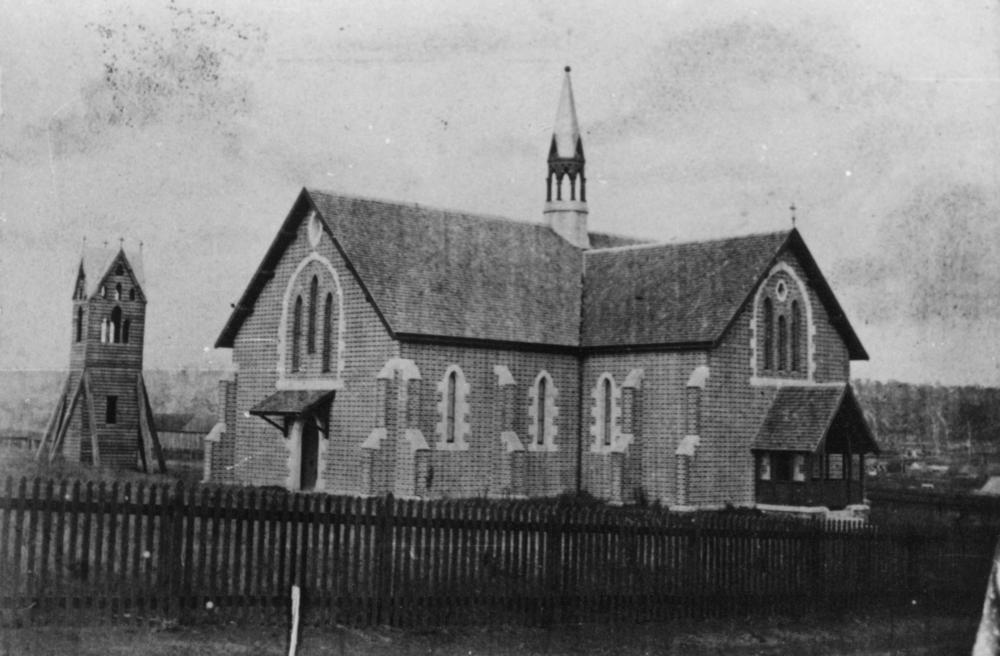
St. James Church of England during construction in 1869

On 30 June 1860 a petition of 100 names was sent to the Queensland Governor requesting that Toowoomba be declared a Municipality. Governor George Bowen granted their wish and a new municipality was proclaimed on 24 November 1860. The first town council election took place on 4 January 1861 and William Henry Groom, who had led Toowoomba people in their petition for recognition, polled the most votes. On 12 August 1862 Alderman Groom was elected to the Queensland Legislative Assembly as Member for Drayton and Toowoomba.

Also in August 1862, telegraphic communication was opened between Toowoomba and Brisbane.

In 1864 Toowoomba Gaol was opened. After closure in 1900, it became the site of the Austral Hall (1904), a woman's reformatory and laundry (1883–4), Rutlands Guest House, and various other modern sites, including a motel, a restaurant and a town house block.

In 1865 Toowoomba South State School opened, the first State School in Toowoomba itself.

In April, 1867 Toowoomba's rail link with Ipswich was opened.

In 1870 Alderman Spiro replaced William Henry Groom as Mayor. In 1873 Council was granted control of the swamp area and offered a prize of £100 for the best method of draining it.

The Toowoomba Gas and Coke Company was floated in 1875 and the Council pledged to erect street lamps to assist with the establishment of the fledgling company. Due to its financial situation Council leased part of the swamp to town brickmakers.

The Council approved the construction of the Toowoomba Grammar School. The school's foundation stone was laid in this year.

Railway lines from Toowoomba
To	Line	Opened	Closed
Dalby	Western	1868	-
Warwick	Southern	1871	-
Miles	Western	1878	-
Cabarlah	Crows Nest	1883	1961
Crows Nest	Crows Nest	1886	1961

== 1880-1900 ==
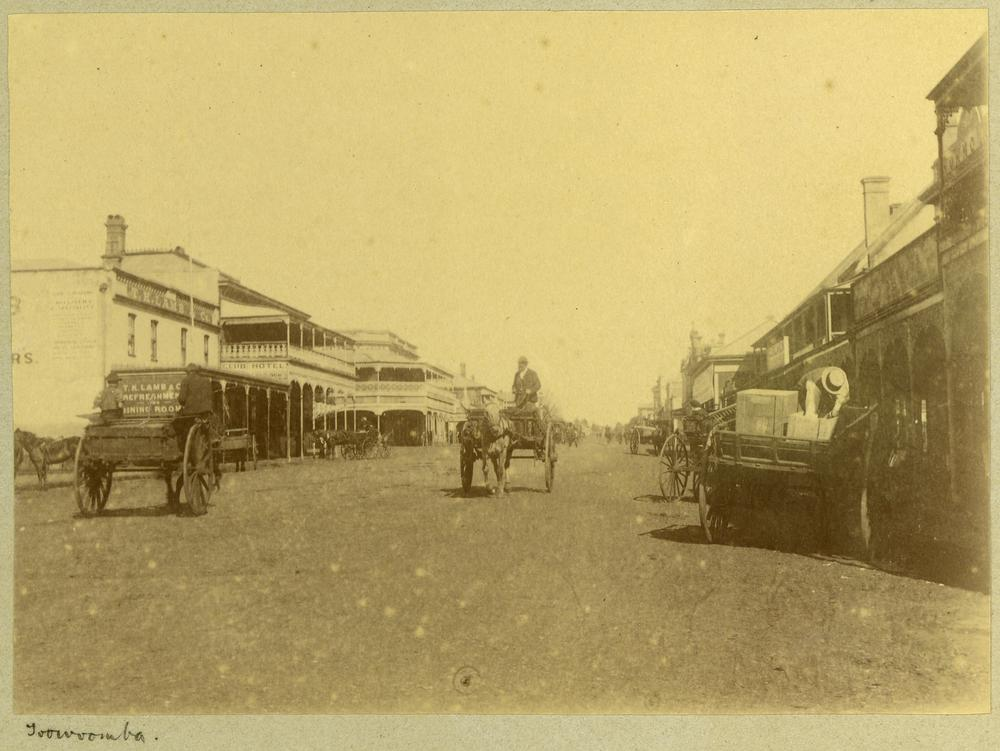
Main Street in 1897

In 1892 the Under Secretary of Public Land proclaimed Toowoomba and the surrounding areas as a township.

By 1898, the existing Town Hall was inadequate for the demands of a growing community. In July, Council agreed that new municipal buildings and a Town Hall should be constructed on the site of the School of Arts which had been destroyed by fire earlier that year, pending the sale of the old Town Hall for £2,000 to the Roman Catholic Church.

== 1900-1920 ==
Council offered a prize of 25 guineas for the best design. Architect Willoughby Powell's design was awarded first prize and the contract to erect the building at a cost of £10,000 went to Alexander Mayes who later was elected Mayor. The new building was opened in 1900 and still stands in Ruthven Street today. A refurbishment program was completed in 1996 at a cost of $3.4 million and Council meetings are once again held there.

The Trevethan, a single cylinder automobile was built in Toowoomba.

At noon on 20 October 1904 Toowoomba's status of a township was changed to a city and every bell and horn was sounded for half a minute to celebrate the event.

A suburban rail motor service commenced in May, 1917, running to Wyreema, 10 miles (16 km) away. It was extended to Cambooya and to Willowburn in 1918. They ceased around 1923.

In 1920, the Jewish synagogue in Toowoomba was targeted in an arson attack. The attackers reportedly entered the synagogue property, breaking down one of the doors, smashed a clock, and lit a fire which burned for three days causing considerable damage.

== 1920-1950 ==
Downlands College was opened in 1931.

World War II saw an influx of American and Australian troops who took over the parks and major buildings for recreational, hospital and training purposes.

== 1950-2010s ==
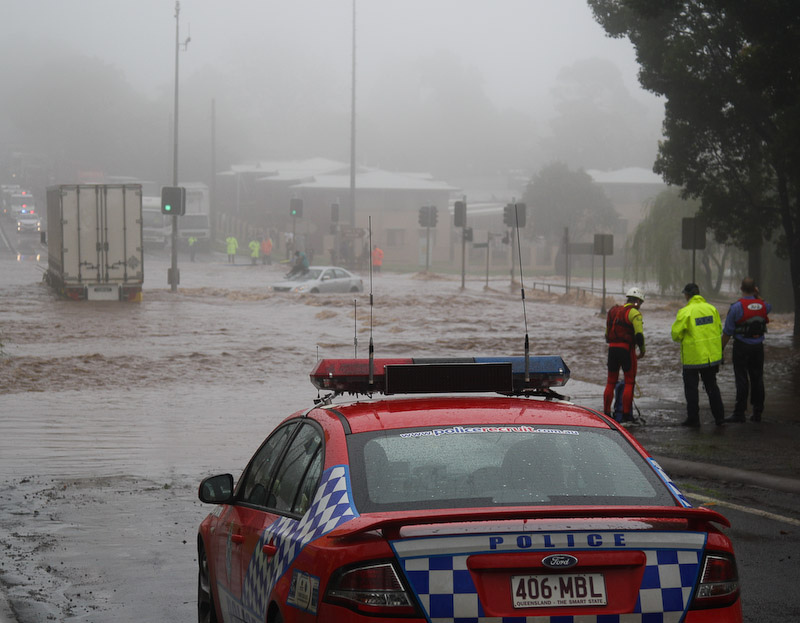
Emergency services attend to a trapped motorist during the January 2011 flash floods

Since the 1950s, Toowoomba has added the provision of tertiary services, military installations, public service departments to its traditional role as a commercial, agricultural and educational centre.

Queensland's first female mayor, Nellie E. Robinson, was elected to the City of Toowoomba in 1961.

A tertiary education centre, the QITDD, was established in Toowoomba in 1967. It became an autonomous college of advanced education, the Darling Downs Institute of Advanced Education (DDIAE) in 1971; a university college (UCSQ) in 1990 and subsequently the University of Southern Queensland (USQ).

In the ensuring years the first highrises in Toowoomba are built reflecting the population and economical growth of the City.

In January 2011, the city was severely affected by flash floods. Parts of the central business district along Gowrie Creek were particular hit and several people lost their lives.

In 2013, local construction company, Wagners, build Australia's first privately built jet-capable airport, and the first one in the city's history; Toowoomba Wellcamp Airport.

In 2014 the Federal Government announce the long-awaited Toowoomba Second Range Crossing, the largest regional infrastructure project in Queensland's history.

== See also ==
- History of Queensland
- List of sites on the Queensland Heritage Register in Toowoomba
