= Karingal Chambers =

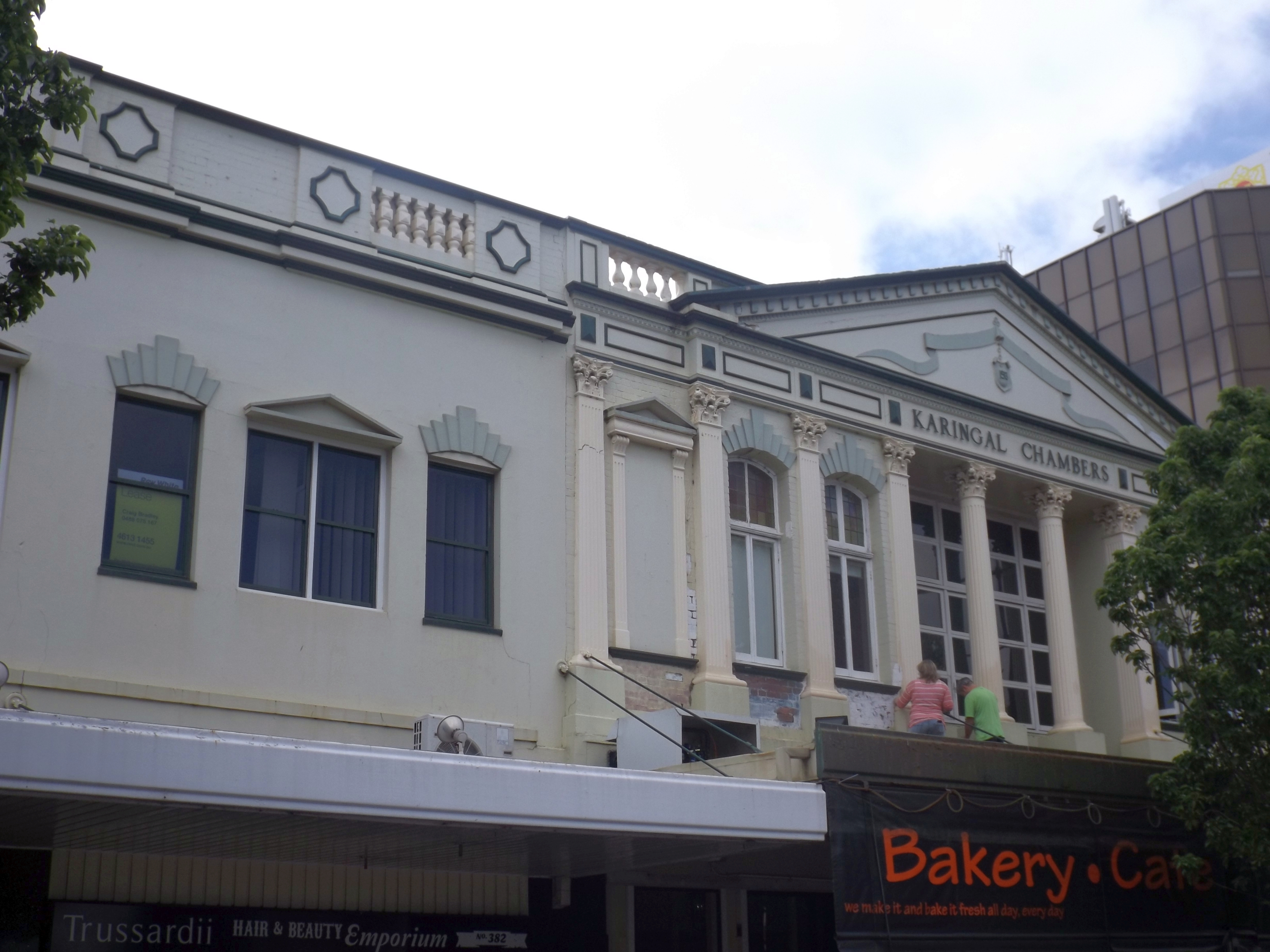
- Building facade, 2014

- Location within Queensland Location within Australia
- 27.5598°S 151.9539°E
- Location: 386–388 Ruthven Street, Toowoomba, Toowoomba Region, Queensland, Australia

History
- Design period: 1900–1914 (early 20th century)
- Built: c. 1913 – c. 1913

Site notes
- Architect: Henry James (Harry) Marks
- Architectural style: Classicism

Queensland Heritage Register
- Official name: Karingal Chambers, Krimmers Chambers, Rowbotham Chambers
- Type: state heritage (built)
- Designated: 28 April 1997
- Reference no.: 600862
- Significant period: 1910s (fabric) c. 1913–ongoing (historical use)

Karingal Chambers is a heritage-listed shopping centre at 386–388 Ruthven Street, Toowoomba, Toowoomba Region, Queensland, Australia. It was designed by Henry James (Harry) Marks and built from c. 1913 to c. 1913. It is also known as Krimmers Chambers and Rowbotham Chambers. It was added to the Queensland Heritage Register on 28 April 1997.

== History ==
Karingal Chambers is a two storeyed rendered masonry building erected c. 1913 on the corner of Ruthven and Bell Streets for Charles Rowbotham. It is attributed to Toowoomba architects, James Marks and Sons.

Rowbotham was a business man, whose family manufactured and imported all classes of shoes. For some years he was a Toowoomba councillor and was Mayor from 1901 to 1902. He acquired the Ruthven Street site, on which a building apparently already existed, in 1906 and mortgaged the property to the Bank of New South Wales for £5,000. The first recording of the name, Rowbotham Chambers, occurs in 1910, however according to the facade the date of the building is 1913. It is believed that Harry Marks, who used the distinctive triangular bay window on his own home erected in 1906, St Rest (now known as Gladstone House), was responsible for the design of the building. Additions along Bell Street may have been added after 1913.

The ground floor contained shops whose tenants included the Frankfort Sausage Co and baker and confectioner, David Webster and later Toowoomba confectioners, caterers, and pastrycooks, TK Lamb and Co Ltd, who operated tea rooms there. The first floor contained offices, including for a number of years, dressmaker, Miss E Rynne and dancing and physical culture teacher, Miss C Marson.

In 1925, the property was acquired by William Charles Krimmer and the building became known as Krimmer's Chambers. It remained in the Krimmer family until 1974, when it was transferred to members of the Sklavos family and later to Western Properties Pty Ltd. In c. 1987, alterations were undertaken which involved work to the ground floor of Karingal Chambers so as to form an arcade with the adjoining property, which became known as Karingal Arcade. In 1991 the property was acquired by the current owners. The ground floor is leased to a number of shops owners and the upper floor to a women's clothing manufacturer.

== Description ==
Karingal Chambers is a two-storeyed rendered masonry building with a pitched corrugated iron roof which occupies a corner site bound by Ruthven Street, Bell Street Mall and Bank Lane. The Ruthven Street facade is parapeted, and decorated with classical elements. The building has a long rectangular C-shaped plan running east–west, which wraps around a centrally located service core of toilets, corridor and stairs. A passageway bisecting the eastern end of the building links to the adjacent Karingal Arcade, and gives access to the service core. The ground floor has been extensively refurbished (c. 1987), and contains six shops. The upper floor contains offices, workshop and storage areas. Changes in brickwork, roofline, lintels and internal linings suggest that the building was built in three stages extending to the east.

The western end of the upper floor consists of a series of offices (some now used for storage) surrounding a large central storage area which are lined with thin VJ timbers, fine picture rails and timber trims forming panels. The rooms overlooking Ruthven Street have arched timber-framed windows with coloured glass in gridded panes to the upper lights, except the centre room which sits behind a recess in the facade which has new aluminium windows. An office overlooking Bell Street Mall has a triangular shaped bay window which also has coloured glass in gridded panes.

The central storage area has a substantial skylight with clerestory lighting, and a smaller, chimney-like skylight. These skylights appear to be unrelated to the organisation of the rooms below them, suggesting that the timber walls are part of an early twentieth century refurbishment. Two larger workrooms extending further to the east are lined with sheeting and coverstrips, and a large workroom to the rear appears to have been refitted c. 1970s.

The elevation to Ruthven St is a symmetrical composition with a central trabeated alcove flanked by tall windows and pilasters, and spanned by a pediment set in a parapet with a balustrade. The pediment has a cornice with dentils, and a ribbon in relief, framing a badge with "1913" on it. The columns and pilasters have corinthian capitals, and meet a substantial cornice decorated with square and rectangular motifs, which is inscribed with the words "Karingal Chambers". The four central windows are arched, with exaggerated voussoirs, while the two outermost windows are surmounted with small pediments.

The Bell Street Mall elevation is divided into three by changes in the detailing, brickwork and roofline. The western end has arched doorways with keystones to its base, and flat arched windows with exaggerated voussoirs either side of the triangular bay window above. The rest of the facade has more modest flat arched windows.

The building contains some fine interior features, in particular the windows and VJ linings and panels to the western end of the building. The Ruthven Street frontage contributes to streetscape in scale and detail as one of a series of decorative early twentieth century facades on Toowoomba's main street.

== Heritage listing ==
Karingal Chambers was listed on the Queensland Heritage Register on 28 April 1997 having satisfied the following criteria.

The place is important in demonstrating the evolution or pattern of Queensland's history.

The place is one of a number of buildings, including Pigott's Building and White Horse Hotel contributing to the streetscape of Ruthven Street and demonstrating the development and continuing importance of Ruthven Street.

The place is important because of its aesthetic significance.

Karingal Chambers in Toowoomba is important in exhibiting a range of aesthetic characteristics valued by the community, in particular the contribution in scale and detail of the Ruthven Street frontage to the streetscape; and the interior which contains some fine decorative elements, including the windows and VJ linings and panels to the western end of the building. In addition, Karingal Chambers forms an important townscape element of the Bell Street Mall.

The place has a special association with the life or work of a particular person, group or organisation of importance in Queensland's history.

It is an example of the eclectic range of the commercial work of Toowoomba architects, James Marks and Sons.
