= Trevethan (automobile) =

Early Australian automobile

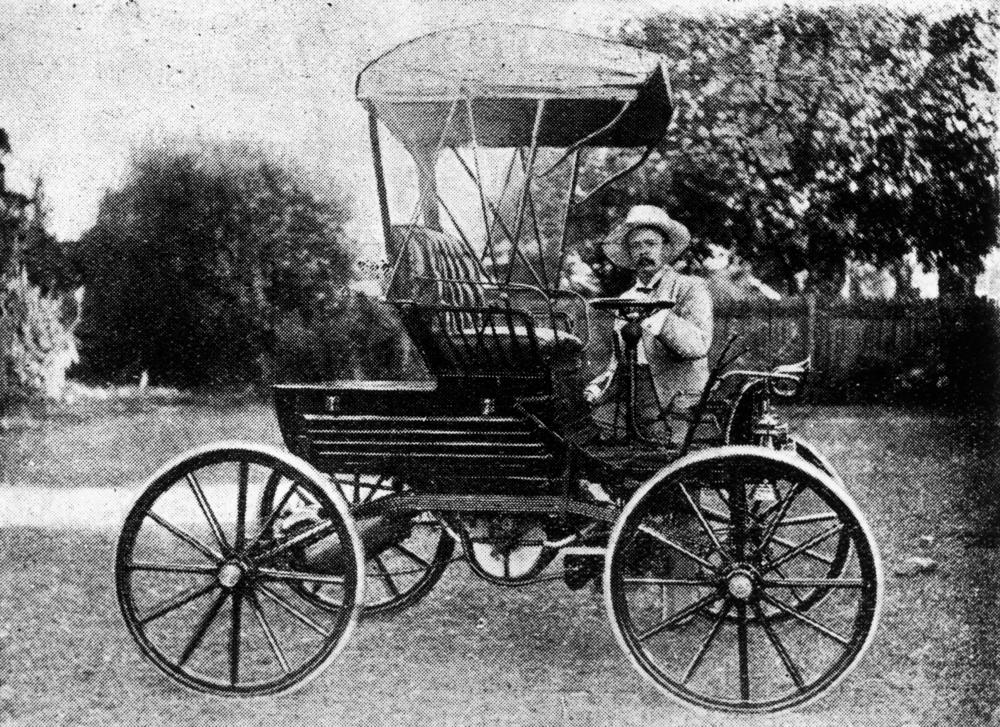
The single cylinder 1902 Trevethan

The Trevethan was an Australian automobile built in Toowoomba, Queensland by the Thomas and Walter Trevethan carriage building company. The vehicle had chain-drive and solid rubber tyres.
