= The Downs Club =

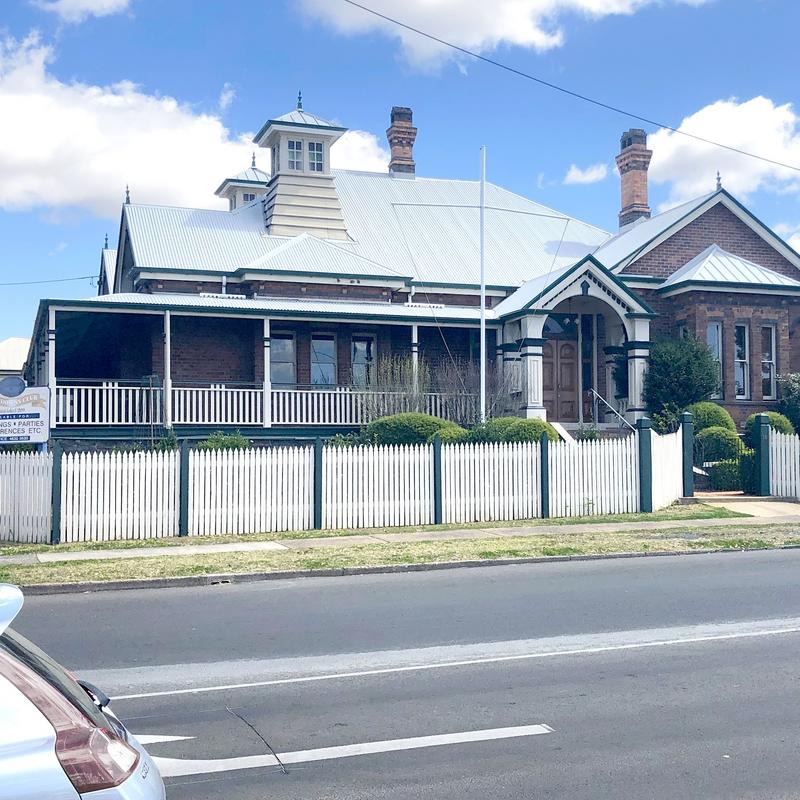
- The Downs Club, Mylne Street, 2020

- Location within Queensland
- 27.5599°S 151.9491°E
- Location: 15 Mylne Street, Toowoomba, Toowoomba Region, Queensland, Australia

History
- Design period: 1900-1914 Early 20th century
- Built: 1900,1900,1909,1912,1972,1989,1989

Site notes
- Architect: James Marks and Son

Queensland Heritage Register
- Official name: The Downs Club; Downs Club Inc
- Type: state heritage
- Designated: 4 December 2020
- Reference no.: 650257
- Type: Social and Community: Clubrooms - gentlemen's
- Theme: Creating social and cultural institutions: Organisations and societies

The Downs Club is a heritage-listed gentlemen's club at 15 Mylne Street, Toowoomba, Toowoomba Region, Queensland, Australia. It was designed by James Marks and Son and built in 1900. It was added to the Queensland Heritage Register on 4 December 2020.

== History ==
The Downs Club is situated in a central location in Toowoomba on the corners of Margaret, Mylne and Isabel streets. Constructed in 1900 as the second clubhouse for the exclusive gentlemen's club, the Downs Club (established in 1889), the stately brick building with generous grounds and gardens, reflects the members' desire to convey a sense of prestige, exclusivity, and privacy. Designed by prominent and innovative Toowoomba architecture firm, James Marks and Son, the club was modelled on the principles of 19th century British gentlemen's clubs and showcases the firm's characteristic architectural features. Within the grounds is an original stable (1900) and a detached steward's room (1909). As at 2020, the Downs Club continues its tradition as a gentlemen's club.

European settlement of the Toowoomba area, traditional country of the Giabal and Jarowair people, commenced in 1840 when squatters occupied pastoral runs on the Darling Downs. The small settlement of Drayton evolved from 1842, but was soon surpassed by a more desirable location six kilometres to the northeast, known as Toowoomba from the 1850s. Better suited to market gardening, with a more reliable water supply, and supported by squatters and land speculators, Toowoomba was incorporated as a municipality in 1860. Its rapid economic and social development was influenced by local residents who strongly promoted the prospects of the town, and political representatives who successfully lobbied for government funding for civic improvements.

As Toowoomba progressed in the 1870–80s, a commercial centre emerged. The construction of a police station and post office near the courthouse firmly established the upper (eastern) end of Margaret Street as a government precinct. By the 1880s the Russell, Ruthven, and Margaret Street block (western end) was pre-eminent as the commercial centre of Toowoomba. Banks, retail stores, hotels, and commercial businesses flourished as the population of the town increased. The surrounding pastoral properties depended on these businesses to provide services and products. Visits to town often became social occasions.

The first gentlemen's club in Toowoomba was established by a group of wealthy squatters (pastoralists with large holdings often termed 'Pure Merinos') in the early 1860s, eager to have their own private club in town, where they could stay overnight and socialise with other men of similar social standing. Just prior to this, in 1859 the prestigious Queensland Club had been founded in Brisbane. Once established, the new Toowoomba club became known as "The Union Club", with a stately clubhouse constructed on Russell Street (as at 2020, known as Clifford House). Only the wealthy could afford membership fees, ensuring the club's exclusivity. This was, however, short-lived, and by 1870 the building had been sold and the club dissolved.

By the 1880s in Toowoomba, the dominance of the squattocracy in Darling Downs society had been supplemented by a wealthy and influential professional and business class. A desire emerged amongst men in both the town and pastoral districts, for the establishment of a new gentlemen's club. At a meeting held 20 July 1889 in the Club Hotel (on the corner of Margaret and Ruthven streets), the decision was made to form such an association. The club was to base their rules on those of the Queensland Club and membership would consist of a four guinea entrance fee (just over £4) and an annual subscription of two guineas for town members, with country members (those who lived more than 10 miles (16 km) from Toowoomba) to pay approximately half this amount. Although not as expensive as the Queensland Club's membership at the time, which was £12 per year, it was still a considerable sum. The club was a private club for men of distinction and provided a social and recreational venue for those with common interests and socio-economic backgrounds. Initially called the "Darling Downs Club", it began with a membership of 44. By July 1890, this had increased to 66. One could only become a member if voted in by the members, thus ensuring exclusivity. The first president of the club was William Alexander Jenyns Boyd, headmaster of the Toowoomba Grammar School. Members included "Pure Merinos" such as Robert Ramsay of Eton Vale Homestead and William Ball Slade of Glengallan Homestead. Several doctors, solicitors and politicians were also amongst the first club members, including the Minister for Railways at the time, Hon. Hugh Nelson.

The Darling Downs Club's first club rooms were within the Club Hotel. These were specially built for them, to a design by Toowoomba architect James Marks, described at the first annual meeting as "the billiard room, card-room, and general room", with all the furniture, including a Burroughes and Watts' of London billiard table, paid for by club funds; the Queensland Club also had this make of billiard table. These club rooms were later demolished as was the hotel. By the mid-1890s the club was better known as the "Downs Club". As membership continued to increase, the club's accommodation proved inadequate. Problems had also arisen when members did not receive adequate service from the hotel staff.

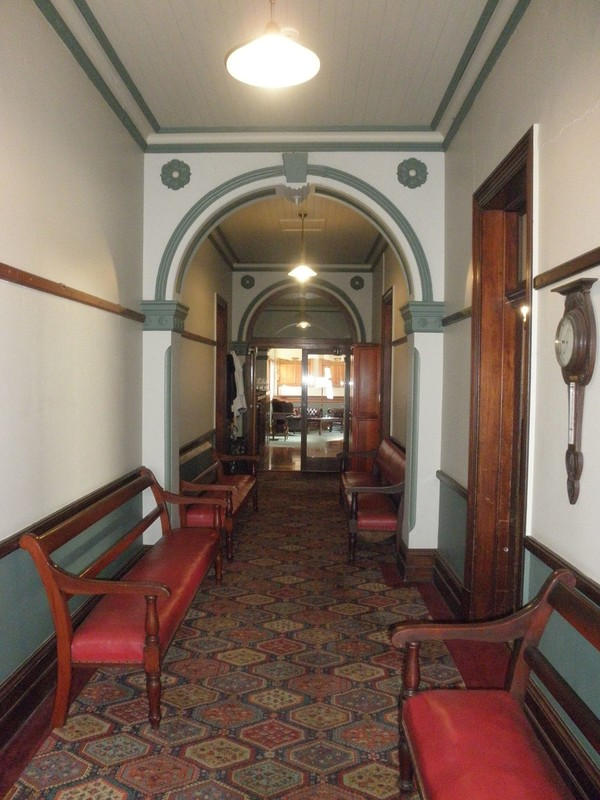
Hall looking toward the Members' Bar at the west, 2020

The construction of a new clubhouse was deemed essential and in January 1900 a property on the corner of Margaret and Mylne streets was purchased from James Taylor jnr, a founding member of the club and the son of prominent Toowoomba resident, James Taylor. The property totalled 2 roods (2,000 m^{2}), consisted of 5 lots (L16-20 RP16262 in 2020) and cost £500. Architects were invited to submit designs in early 1899, for a brick clubhouse that would not cost more than £1000, with a five guinea prize for the successful firm. Two Toowoomba-based architecture firms, James Marks and Son and William Hodgen, submitted designs, the former becoming the winner.

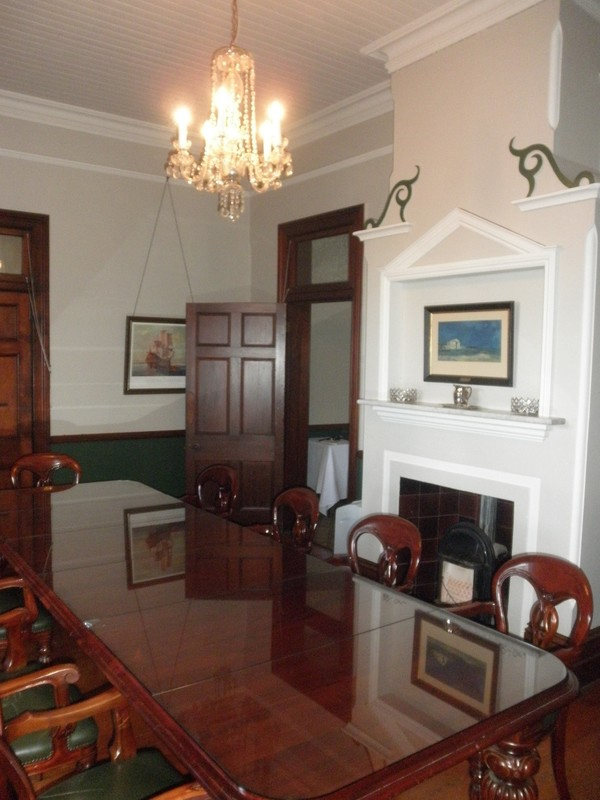
Strangers' Room, 2020

On 26 August 1899, James Marks and Son called for tenders "for the erection of a Club Building in Margaret street, for the Downs Club". The contractor was Harry Andrews. Funds were raised for the £1526 clubhouse through a debenture scheme, with each member offered £5 debentures. Work on the new clubhouse commenced swiftly and by May 1900 the building had been completed. To celebrate the opening of the clubhouse, a ball was held. The event was featured in the social pages of the newspapers, "The Downs Club ball on Thursday evening was a brilliant one ... The reception rooms were beautifully decorated".

The Downs Club was modelled of a 19th-century British gentlemen's club, as was the 1884 Queensland Club building in Brisbane. Clubs were established throughout the British Empire at this time in an attempt to affirm members' affiliations (perceived or actual) with Britain, through the social and recreational traditions held by the club. Food, drink, and convivial company with like-minded gentlemen attracted members. Many clubs also offered overnight accommodation. Of utmost importance in the design was the provision of members' privacy, exclusivity, and prestige. Only members were permitted into the "inner sanctum" of the club rooms, which generally included a reading room, smoking room, card room, billiard room, club room, and dining room; guests were known as "strangers" and relegated to a strangers' room close to the entrance, but apart from the main club rooms, ensuring members' privacy. If guests were allowed into the club proper, they were required to sign a book and were allowed only limited access. Stewards were employed to police this tradition and to provide service to members. Clubs also offered their members recreational activities including team sports.

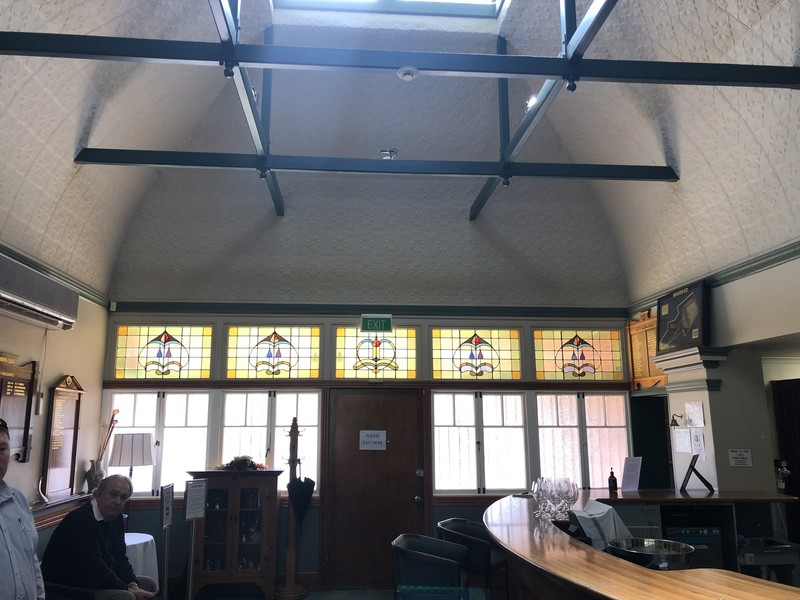
Members' Bar, 2020

When first completed, the one-story brick Federation era-style clubhouse, situated on the rise of the hill on the corner of Margaret and Mylne streets, conveyed a sense of prestige and distinction, which followed the tradition of gentlemen's clubs both in England (in particular London) and colonial clubs throughout the British Empire. The layout of the club ensured control of the members' and non-members' spaces from inside and privacy from outside. An entrance vestibule separated the clubhouse from the outside world, and connected separately to a strangers' room at the front of the building. Heavy double doors led into the club rooms via a stately central hall. The luxuriously appointed rooms included the reading room, billiards room, small washroom, and banquet room. To the rear of the clubhouse was a detached timber auxiliary building with the kitchen, a (steward's) bedroom, and storeroom. There was also a modest timber stable at the rear. The club did not offer overnight accommodation to its members.

In February 1909, a large fire broke out at the rear of the clubhouse which destroyed the timber auxiliary building, the "flames quickly got hold of the back rooms, built of wood, comprising a kitchen, bedroom, and a storeroom....Luckily the wind was blowing strongly from the east, and assisted in keeping the flames entering the main building". The brick clubhouse was not damaged, nor was the stable. Following the fire, the club purchased a 16 perch (405 m^{2}) block to the rear of the clubhouse (as at 2020, the land parcel L31 RP16276) from James Taylor. On 13 March 1909, tenders were called by architecture firm HJ Marks and Lane, for "Additions and Alterations to the Downs Club". Costing £455, the work included the relocation of the stable to the newly purchased rear lot and the construction of a separate timber steward's room, with its own small cellar, beside the stable. A cellar was also constructed beneath the brick clubhouse. It is likely that the members' bar at the rear of the club was constructed at this time. Also in this year, camphor laurel trees (Cinnamomum camphora) were planted along the fence line, and would be manicured to become a hedge. A timber fence was constructed at this time to replace an earlier one.

The architecture firm James Marks and Son, responsible for the design of the clubhouse, comprised father and son architects James Marks (1834–1915) and Henry (Harry) James Marks (1871–1939). It operated from 1892 until 1910. James had commenced practice as James Marks, Architect in Toowoomba by the early 1880s and was successful, being responsible for notable and high-profile buildings in the Downs region. Born and trained in Toowoomba, his son Harry was a highly creative and inventive designer, and together, the practice continued James' success and was responsible for a variety of further impressive buildings. These included the house Rodway, St James Parish Hall, St Luke's Church Hall, additions to the Toowoomba Maltings, and Harry's own family home "St Rest" (as at 2020, known as Gladstone House). James retired in 1906, and Harry briefly practiced as HJ Marks and Lane (1909–10), calling tenders for the 1909 additions to the Downs Club. The practice under its various names has been described as dominating the architectural profession in Toowoomba for more than half a century. James' second son, Reginald Marks, formally joined the practice in 1910 and it was renamed James Marks and Sons and after James' death in 1915 it operated as such until 1917, when Reginald left to work in Sydney. Harry's practice recommenced in 1925 as Harry J Marks and Son (with Harry's son Charles) until Harry's death in 1939.

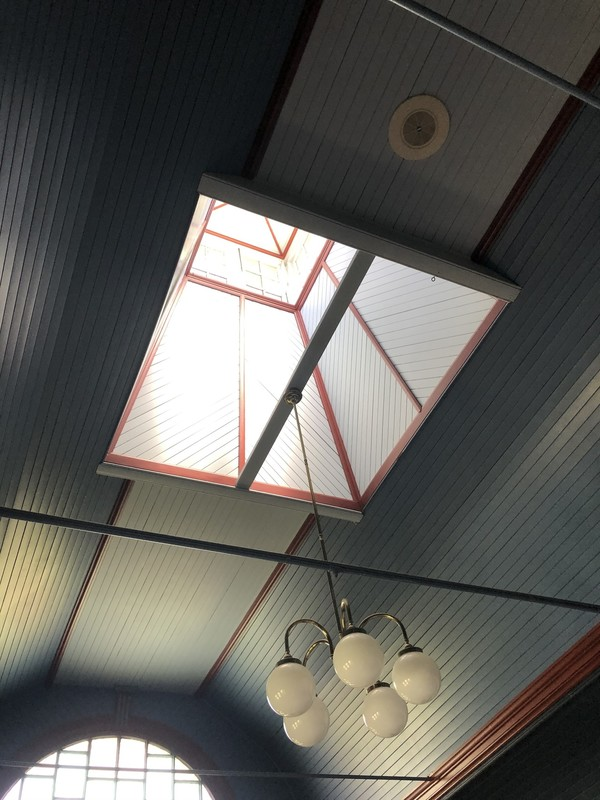
The roof lantern in the reading room, 2020

Harry Marks was also described as being gifted with inventive genius. He devised and patented a number of architectural elements, including roof ventilators, windows and a method of stucco wall construction. His designs included many of his patented inventions and other architectural devices such as roof lanterns and high ceilings that focused on the provision of natural light and ventilation to the interior. His architectural style has been described as "stylish exaggeration" with "little surface decoration" relying more on the "proportions and massing of the roofs and rooms".

The Downs Club exemplifies James Marks and Sons' work and in particular, Harry Marks' design influence. Privacy was foremost, and windows in the clubhouse at eye level were few and relatively small. Additionally, there were no French doors on the verandah, limiting access. This possible lack of light and ventilation was countered by including impressive double barrel-vaulted ceilings with tall lanterns and brightly lit voids, high-level semi-circular windows, fanlights above internal doors, Harry's patented pot-bellied flues for ventilation, and his patented pivoting casement sash windows, obscured with textured glass. The flues were pot-bellied to include a V-shaped cup that caught any rain that might enter the flue's top, while the windows swung out as regular casements but were not hinged at one edge but when opened they pivoted 360 degrees on a vertical centre axis to catch the breeze regardless of direction.

In the 1910s, the club expanded by purchasing four adjoining vacant lots, totalling 1 rood 24 perches (1,600 m^{2}) to the north on the corner of Mylne and Isabel streets, from James Taylor. In October 1914 tenders were called for "the laying down of two ant-bed tennis courts at the Downs Club" on these lots. Once complete, the tennis courts were made available to associates of members, including females, with the proviso that they "not use any of the Downs Club premises, or any part thereof with the exception of the tennis court proper and the approaches thereto". Camphor laurels were planted along the boundary of the newly acquired property, again manicured as hedges. The stable was extended at this time to include a garage for cars and in 1916 a cricket bowling green was laid.

Throughout the club's history, cricket matches had been held between other gentlemen's clubs, including the Queensland Club and the Warwick Club (established in 1896). Bridge games and billiards tournaments were also held, usually ending with a club dinner.

In the 1920s, further improvements were made to the clubhouse, including replacing the front timber entrance stairs with brick ones. The stable/garage was also extended at this time, reflecting the growing use of motor vehicles in the 1920s. In May 1928 the club held a lavish ball attended by 200 guests. The clubhouse was described at the time:

"In the card and reading rooms, which are connected with folding doors, bowls of beautiful gladioli were used ... in the large lounge, with its high domed roof, there was a wreath of lovely roses ... the spacious hall was grouped with palms ... and in the billiard room, where there was a big cosy fire, the mantel was massed with ... dahlias"

In the 1950s, minor changes were made to the club interior, including painting, kitchen upgrades and an extension to the bar in the members' bar. It was not until 1972, however, that any major changes were made to the clubhouse when a large addition was constructed along its northern side to accommodate a new function room and kitchen. This new wing was designed with a parapet and bay window on the Mylne Street side, copying those of the original building. Changes to the club rules at this time allowed members to invite female guests for lunch in the new functions room and the extension included a ladies' toilet. In 1985, the tennis courts were removed to accommodate a function lawn, and entrance pillars were erected at driveway from Isabel Street. The Downs Club became an incorporated association in 1988.

As the club approached its centenary celebrations in 1989, a new garden room was constructed to the north of the 1972 function room, known as the Centenary Room. This enlarged the function space considerably and a locally designed and locally made leadlight window, bearing the club's name, was installed in the front wall, to commemorate the occasion.

The Downs Club, established in 1889, continues its original use as a private gentlemen's club. The 1900 brick clubhouse, designed by James Marks and Son, incorporating Harry Marks' innovative architectural features, set in generous grounds, has played a role in its successive members' social and recreational lives since the late 19th century. Although still a private club, in recent years the Downs Club has opened some of its facilities for venue hire to the public for occasions such as weddings.

== Description ==
The Downs Club is a highly-intact, purpose-built private men's clubhouse standing prominently on a generous site immediately west of the Toowoomba CBD. The site has streets on three sides - Margaret Street to its south, Mylne on its east, and Isabel on its north. Still used for its original purpose, the clubhouse stands at the southern end of the rectangular site with an attractive garden setting. It has had two extensions on its northern side (1972 and 1989) and a function aawn (1989) is to its north. Two small outbuildings are to the rear (west) of the clubhouse, the steward's room (1909) and the former stable (1900) with its garage extension (from c. 1912).

=== Clubhouse (1900) and its two extensions (1972 and 1989) ===
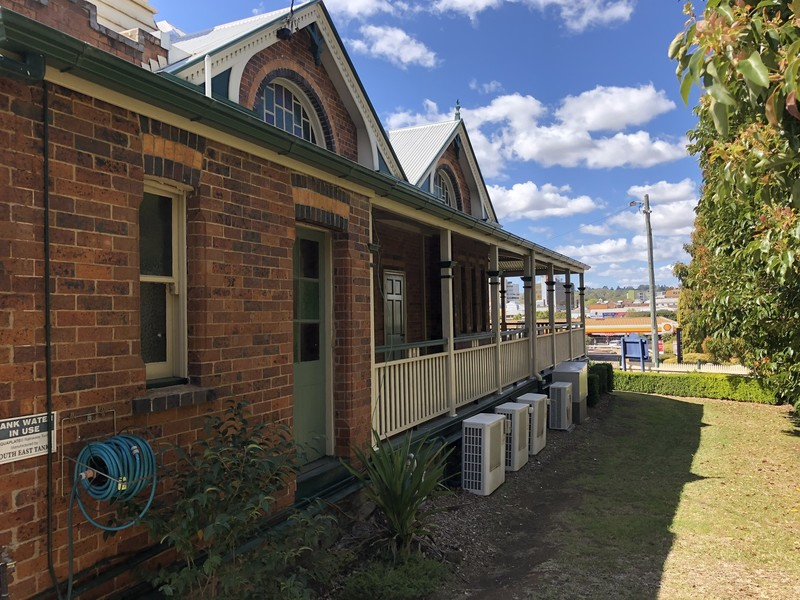
Side of the Clubhouse, as seen from Margaret Street, 2020

Highly intact, the original section of the clubhouse is an impressive single-storey building in a Federation-era style with asymmetrical massing and form. It is a loadbearing brick structure with timber-framed floors and roof, and the exterior walls and tall chimneys are face brick. It faces east, has an L-shaped timber verandah on its front and southern side, and a complex main roof of projecting hips and gables and two tall spire-like lanterns. Attached at the rear is a rectangular room (the members' bar), which has a separate hip roof with lantern and overhanging awnings on its north and south sides.

The front entrance is via a wide brick-lined stair, through an arched entrance porch with a gable roof, into a small square vestibule. The vestibule has doors into various parts of the clubhouse, controlling access depending on member status. A secondary entrance to the site is via a small side gate from Margaret Street which leads directly to the washroom on the end of the southern verandah, which also controls access.

The internal layout comprises a central hall with rooms either side. On the south are the two largest rooms: the reading room and the billiards room, which can be combined via a folding partition. On the north is the small stranger's room at the front (for non-members), and a large banquet room, comprising two joined rooms. At the rear is the members' bar.

The original section's windows, doors, and circulation routes are noticeably designed for privacy control, reflecting its original private club use. Its interior decorative treatments are relatively restrained, although this is amplified by the rooms' complex spatial forms.

=== Gents' toilets extension ===
Doors from the billiards room and the members' bar lead to a small gents' toilets extension. It is an early addition built to the rear of the building, with entrance doors that match the original section. Its exterior is face brick and it has timber-framed double-hung windows and a flat roof.

=== Function room extension (1972) ===
Attached along the northern side of the original section of the clubhouse is the function room extension (1972), a single-storey structure with a cellar and a flat roof. Its exterior is face brick and combines architectural details that mimic the original section as well as details contemporary with its construction. It is accessed from the clubhouse's northern rooms, and from the exterior (west and north) for loading and staff entrances. It accommodates a large function room to the front (east) and to the rear of this is a ladies' toilets, kitchen, storeroom, and office (with stair to cellar).

=== Centenary Room extension (1989) ===
The Centenary Room extension (1989) is a single-storey structure attached to the north side of the function foom extension. It is a face brick building with flat roof. It accommodates a single large function room, the entire north wall of which projects out as a bay window with a conservatory roof. Access into the room is from a large opening in the function room extension and from the exterior through large sliding doors in the bay window. These doors lead out the long expanse of the function lawn, which forms the backdrop of the Centenary Room.

=== Steward's room (1909) ===
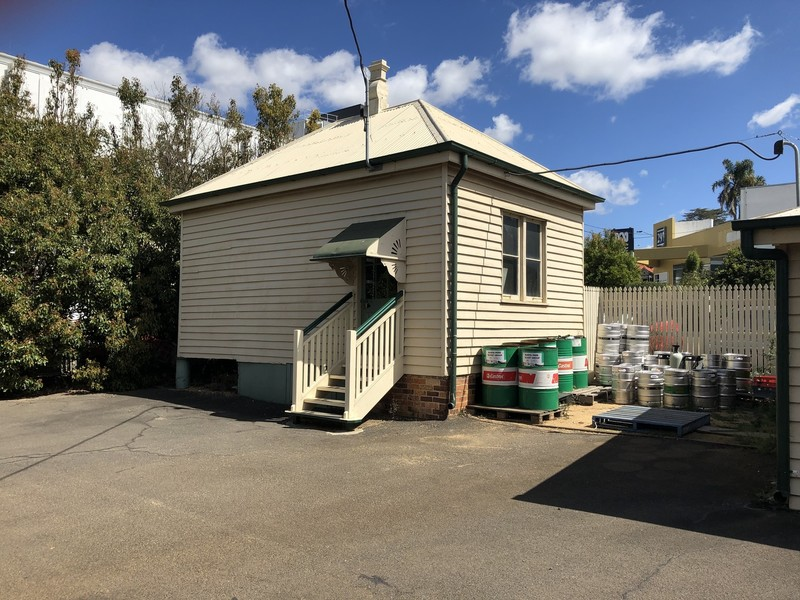
Steward's room, 2020

The steward's room (1909) is a small, single-storey timber-framed and -clad building standing to the rear of the clubhouse near Margaret Street. It is elevated from the ground and has a small brick enclosure to its understorey. It has a hip roof clad and a central metal pot-bellied flue (Marks patent). Its two windows facing Margaret Street have been sheeted over. A window on the opposite (north) side has two pivoting casement sashes (Marks patent). Entrance to the building is via a door on the east side and the west side is blank.

=== Former stable (1900, moved 1909) and garage extension (c. 1912) ===
The former stable and its garage extension stands to the rear (west) of the clubhouse, near and north of the steward's room. It is a small single-storey building built on the ground. It comprises two sections - the original stable, and later extension discernible by joins in the timber members.

The original skillion-roofed timber-framed stable comprises the rear (west) half of the building. Its western wall has been partially demolished and replaced with a concrete block wall and a large caged opening has been made in the southern wall.

The garage extension is the eastern half and continues the skillion roof line to double it in size and accommodate vehicles. The extension is part timber-framed and part face brick, suggesting it may have occurred in two stages.

=== Grounds and garden setting ===
The clubhouse has a manicured garden on its Mylne and Margaret Street sides, providing an attractive setting. To the north of the site is the functionlawn, a lawn for garden functions. To the west of this is a large bitumen car park, accessed from Isabel Street. Parts of the boundary are lined with a mature camphor laurel (Cinnamomum camphora) hedge.

=== Views ===
From Margaret and Mylne streets, The Downs Club is highly visible and its prominence is emphasised by its striking architecture.

== Heritage listing ==
The Downs Club was listed on the Queensland Heritage Register on 4 December 2020 having satisfied the following criteria.

The place is important in demonstrating the evolution or pattern of Queensland's history.

The Downs Club (1900) is important in demonstrating the establishment of exclusive social institutions for wealthy males in colonial Queensland, based on British cultural traditions. Its origins and continued use as a traditional gentlemen's club are illustrated in its form, materials and layout.

Later extensions to the clubhouse in 1972 and then in 1989 (to mark the club's centenary) illustrate the continued operation of the club into the late 20th century and reflects its expanded use and access.

The place is important in demonstrating the principal characteristics of a particular class of cultural places.

In its form, fabric, materials and layout, the Downs Club is important in demonstrating the principal characteristics of a purpose-built gentlemen's club of the late 19th and early 20th centuries. Highly intact, these principal characteristics include its: central location with dignified street appearance; privacy control measures (hedged garden setting and floor plan arrangement separating members and non-members); high quality design, construction, and furnishings; and provision of strangers' room, leisure and games rooms (reading, billiards), rooms for shared drinking and dining (bar and banquet rooms), facilities for members from "out of town" (washroom, stable/garage), and service facilities (steward's room).

Designed by James Marks and Son, the Downs Club is important in demonstrating the principal characteristics of the work of this important Toowoomba architecture firm, notable for its prolific and high quality body of work in Queensland. Many of the firm's principal characteristics are demonstrated at the Downs Club including its: skilful and creative architectural design; emphasis on natural daylight and abundant ventilation to the interior; complex interior spatial forms; and use of Harry Marks' patent windows and flues. Highly intact, the Downs Club is an excellent example of the firm's work.

The place is important because of its aesthetic significance.

The Downs Club is important for its aesthetic significance. Viewed from Margaret and Mylne streets, it has a dignified street presence, standing prominently in a hedged garden setting in central Toowoomba. It displays beautiful attributes through its: well-composed design in an expressive Federation-era style; complex asymmetrical roof form punctuated by gables, chimneys, and roof lanterns; striking internal spatial forms with vaulted ceilings and interconnected rooms; and cohesive use of high-quality materials, finishes, and decorative treatments.

The place is important in demonstrating a high degree of creative or technical achievement at a particular period.

The Downs Club is important in demonstrating a high degree of creative achievement in architecture. As an excellent and highly-intact example of James Marks and Son's work, a firm renowned for its design and technical expertise and innovation, the clubhouse demonstrates a skilful use of Federation-era style, with striking internal spatial forms, and the firm's own patented windows and flues.

The place has a strong or special association with a particular community or cultural group for social, cultural or spiritual reasons.

The place has a special association with past and present members of the Downs Club as the organisation's headquarters and the principal venue for its social and recreational activities continuously for more than 120 years.
