= Tawa, Toowoomba =

Tawa
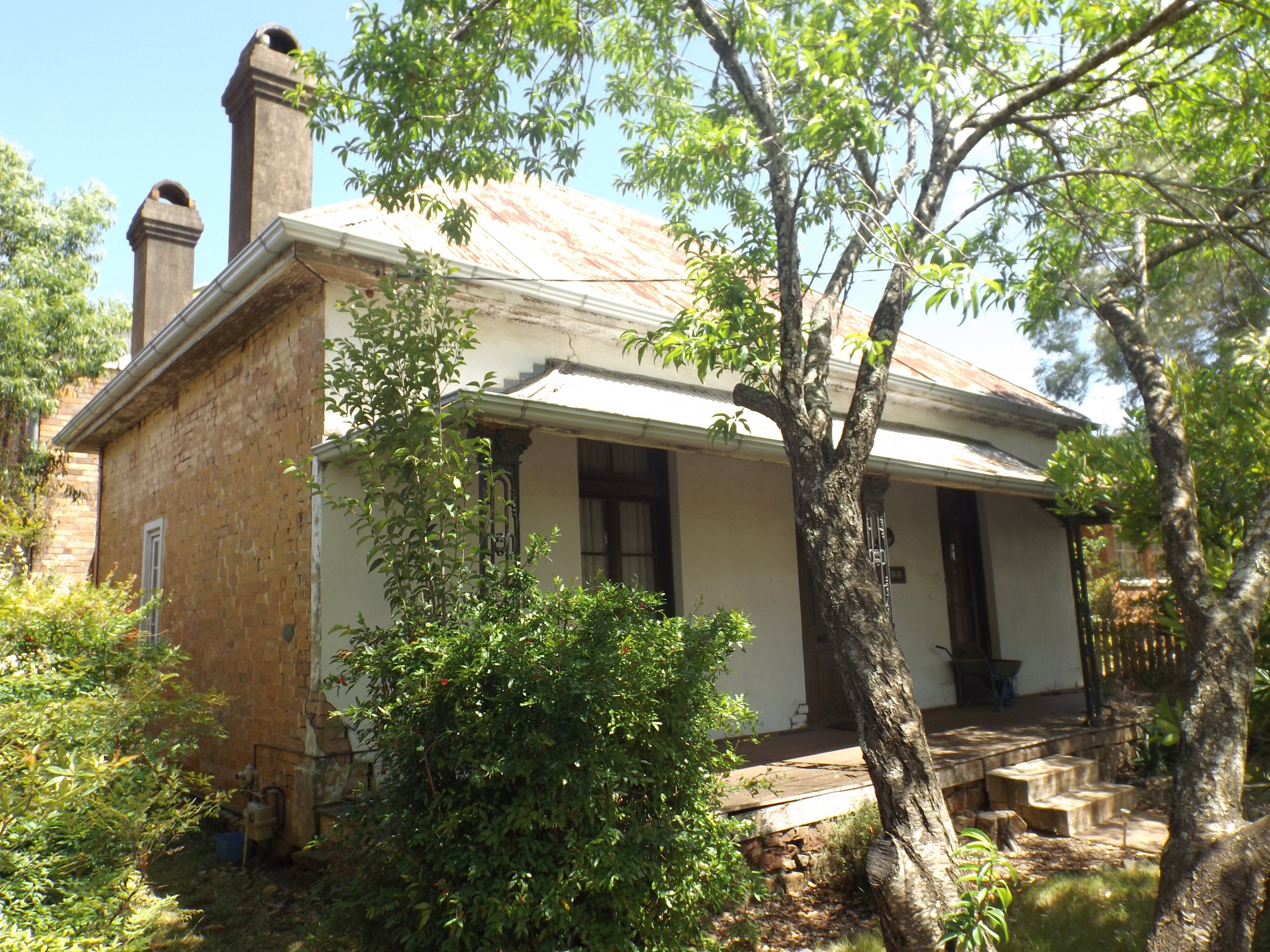
- Front of the residence, 2014

- Location within Queensland Location within Australia
- 27.5532°S 151.9454°E
- Location: 9 Boulton Street, Toowoomba City, Toowoomba, Toowoomba Region, Queensland, Australia

History
- Design period: 1840s–1860s (mid-19th century)
- Built: circa 1860s

Queensland Heritage Register
- Official name: Tawa
- Type: state heritage (built)
- Designated: 31 October 1994
- Reference no.: 601301
- Significant period: 1860s (fabric, historical)
- Significant components: residential accommodation – main house

Tawa is a heritage-listed cottage at 9 Boulton Street, Toowoomba City, Toowoomba, Toowoomba Region, Queensland, Australia. It was built circa 1860s. It was added to the Queensland Heritage Register on 31 October 1994.

== History ==
Erected reputedly during the mid 1850s, this single storey brick cottage survives as one of the earliest dwellings in Toowoomba.

In April 1849, Surveyor JC Burnett laid out 12 allotments on the left bank of the West Swamp. The allotments ranged in size from 27 to 40 acres, and were known as the Drayton Swamp Agricultural Reserve. Six of these "Swamp allotments" were offered at auction in November 1849. As there were no bidders for these allotments, they were resubmitted to auction in October 1850, at which time William Horton, a publican of Drayton, acquired allotments five and six. Allotments one to four and the remaining six allotments were auctioned in March 1851; allotments seven to nine were acquired by Horton and allotments 10–12 were purchased by Sydney businessmen Thomas Sutcliffe Mort and Alexander Campbell Brown, and their Toowoomba partner Thomas Ayerst. The remaining allotments one to four were sold in July 1857.

Tawa is located on part of allotment 11 acquired by Mort, Brown and Ayerst. By 1855, Mort had acquired the three allotments in his own name; this area of Toowoomba came to be known as the Mort Estate.

Mort had arrived in Sydney in 1838, and during the early 1840s, proceeded to establish his reputation as an auctioneer, and was particularly involved in wool sales. From 1850–51, Mort, who by this time was considered the premier auctioneer in Sydney, entered into a business partnership with Brown, as Mort and Brown. Mort's wealth multiplied during the 1850s as a result of successful speculation in pastoral properties. Mort's later business ventures were undertaken through Mort and Co, established in 1855, and which included Mort's brother, Henry.

In December 1862, Martin Boulton of Toowoomba acquired subdivisions 21–24 of allotment 11. Prior to moving to Toowoomba, Boulton had operated a General Store in Leyburn. Boulton, a brother-in-law of prominent Toowoomba businessmen Thomas Alford, Joseph King and James Taylor, was actively involved in the granting of municipality status to Toowoomba (1860) and was elected as a member of the first Toowoomba Town Council.

Boulton had commenced subdividing the land by 1864, and established a row of terrace cottages on the Mort Estate which came to be known as Boulton Terrace. Boulton took out a mortgage on the land in 1866, increasing his borrowing the following year. Boulton was declared insolvent later in 1867, and the property taken over by the Bank of New South Wales.

An application for the land to be bought under the Real Property system in 1881, mentioned Boulton, Alfred Smith, George Weale and Stephen H Wichello as tenants of the land. A lease was issued to Wichello, a Toowoomba tanner, from July 1882.

The property was progressively subdivided from November 1891 and changed hands a number of times. By 1970 the front of Tawa had been enclosed with fibro. Tawa was renovated in 1971, at which time the fibro was removed, and wallpaper replaced with paper to match the original wallpaper. Norman and Elizabeth Oliver, owners of Tawa from 1971 to 1974, opened Tawa to the public.

Tawa was acquired by the present owners in 1979. A two-storeyed extension to the rear of Tawa was completed in 1983, and constructed of brick recycled from the old Toowoomba General Hospital.

== Description ==
Tawa, a small single-storeyed brick residence with a steeply pitched hipped corrugated iron roof, is located fronting Boulton Street to the east.

The building has a verandah to the east with a concave corrugated iron awning supported by cast iron columns, stamped BUBB & SON, and a timber floor. The central entry has a panelled timber door with fanlight, and is flanked by a French door to either side. There are two rendered chimney stacks on the southern side, and the building has timber sash windows with arched headers. The northern and southern elevations are face brick, the eastern is rendered, and the western is partly rendered showing evidence of earlier additions which have been removed. A timber passage with a corrugated iron gable roof connects to a recent free standing structure to the west.

Internally, the plan consists of four rooms with a central rear foyer. Walls are rendered brick with wallpaper (with some evidence of earlier wallpaper), ceilings are hardboard with timber cover strips below early plaster and lathe, and cedar joinery includes panelled doors, architraves and skirtings. The two fireplaces have timber surrounds, and the floors consist of pitsawn boards with carpet over.

A narrow driveway is located on the northern side of the house, accessing the rear of the property, and an iron fence consisting of security grilles from the Baillie Henderson Hospital in Toowoomba is a recent addition to the eastern boundary.

== Heritage listing ==
Tawa was listed on the Queensland Heritage Register on 31 October 1994 having satisfied the following criteria.

The place is important in demonstrating the evolution or pattern of Queensland's history.

Tawa survives as one of the earliest dwellings in Toowoomba, and is important in demonstrating the pattern of development of Toowoomba as a residential location from the 1850s.

The place is important in demonstrating the principal characteristics of a particular class of cultural places.

The building, located in one of Toowoomba's earliest residential subdivisions, is important in demonstrating 1860s methods of design and construction and makes a strong aesthetic contribution to the Boulton Street streetscape.

The place is important because of its aesthetic significance.

The building, located in one of Toowoomba's earliest residential subdivisions, is important in demonstrating 1860s methods of design and construction and makes a strong aesthetic contribution to the Boulton Street streetscape.

The place has a special association with the life or work of a particular person, group or organisation of importance in Queensland's history.

Located in Boulton Street, Tawa maintains an association with Martin Boulton, a prominent Toowoomba businessman. Tawa is also associated with Thomas Sutcliffe Mort, one of the land speculators in Toowoomba during the 1850s.
