= Carlton House, Toowoomba =

Carlton House
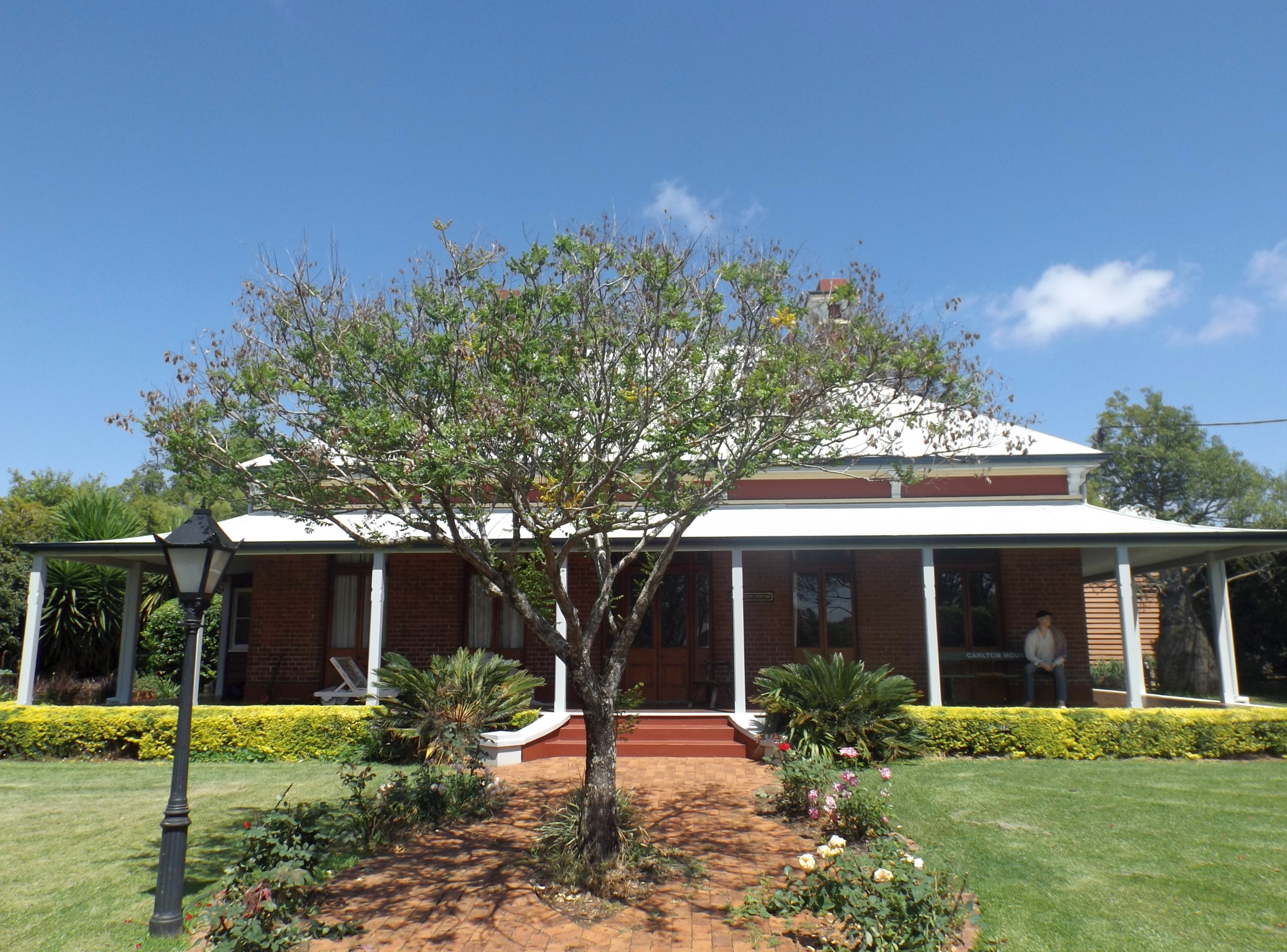
- Front entrance, 2014

- Location within Queensland Location within Australia
- 27.5558°S 151.9505°E
- Location: 3 Mill Street, Toowoomba, Toowoomba Region, Queensland, Australia

History
- Design period: 1870s–1890s (late 19th century)
- Built: c. 1875–1900s

Queensland Heritage Register
- Official name: Carlton House
- Type: state heritage (built, landscape)
- Designated: 31 October 1994
- Reference no.: 601308
- Significant period: 1870s, 1900s, 1920s/1930s (fabric); 1870s–1920s (historical)
- Significant components: paving, attic, garden/grounds, furniture/fittings, stables, trees/plantings, residential accommodation – staff quarters, residential accommodation – main house, tank stand, kitchen/kitchen house

Carlton House is a heritage-listed boarding house at 3 Mill Street, Toowoomba, Toowoomba Region, Queensland, Australia. It was built from c. 1875 to 1900s. It was added to the Queensland Heritage Register on 31 October 1994.

== History ==
Carlton House, which overlooks the Toowoomba Railway yards to the east, was erected by 1877 for James Augustus Pearson.

Carlton House is located on allotment 10, part of the first subdivision of land in Toowoomba, surveyed by JC Burnett in 1849. Allotments 10–12 were purchased in March 1851, by Sydney businessmen Thomas Sutcliffe Mort and Alexander Campbell Brown, and their Toowoomba partner Thomas Ayerst

Allotment 10 was acquired by James Taylor in 1862, then by Robert Anthony in 1874. Later in 1874, part of the allotment was acquired by Pearson, recorded in the conveyancing documents as a Toowoomba Storekeeper.

Given the proximity of Carlton House to the Toowoomba Railway Station it has been suggested that Carlton House was erected by Pearson as a guest house for incoming railway passengers. The railway line to Toowoomba was completed in 1867, and a railway station subsequently erected. This station outgrew its usefulness, and in 1871 the decision was taken to construct a new station. The new building was completed in 1874.

In December 1877, Pearson advertised Carlton House in the Toowoomba Chronicle, stating that Families, Ladies or Gentlemen visiting Toowoomba for a few days [would] find superior accommodation at Carlton House, Mort Estate.

Carlton House was acquired by Jane Thomas in 1894. An auction notice for Carlton House in 1899 described it as being well built, and contains in the main building, Drawing and Dining rooms, 5 Bedrooms and Bath room; Kitchen and Servant's room detached. Good brick stable and buggy house... . It appears that additional accommodation for servants was erected during the early 1900s. Carlton House was acquired by Bridget Horan in 1909, then by John Luddy, a Toowoomba victualler in 1917, and by William Glover of Toowoomba in 1924. Post Office Directories suggest that Carlton House operated as a boarding house during the late nineteenth and early twentieth centuries.

William Glover rented Carlton House to his brother-in-law, Colin G Burn, a pawnbroker trading in second hand furniture, in 1924. Shortly after Glover had purchased the House, he left Toowoomba to join his wife in Sydney.

A drainage plan of Carlton House prepared in 1928 indicates a number of proposed plumbing connections. It is understood that half of Carlton House and some of the outbuildings were converted into flats during the 1930s.

Colin Burn purchased Carlton House in 1937 and remained there until his death in 1965. The property was transferred to Burn's 3 children, Gordon, Mavis and Eric, as trustees for Burn, and was later acquired by Eric Burn in 1991. Eric Burn died in 1994, bequeathing the property to Geoffrey Hicks.

In 1998, Carlton House was purchased in a poor condition by Daniel Dusza. Daniel, whom was an Engineer at the University of Southern Queensland at that time, had the intention to restore the residence and its surrounds to their former glory and function. After a few years, he employed the help of Heritage Conservation Management Planners to promulgate and publish a conservation management plan. With this plan, the property was subsequently passed on to Mr. Barron in July 2003, who has completed the work of restoring the property to its present grandeur.

== Description ==
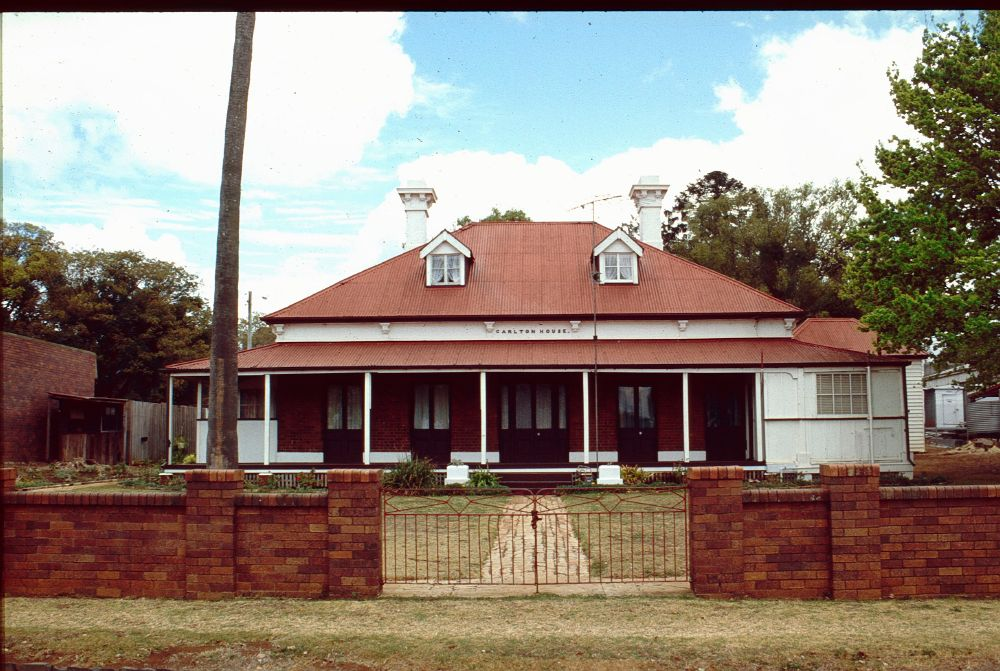
Carlton House, 1994

Carlton House, a single-storeyed with attic brick residence with a hipped corrugated iron roof, is located fronting Mill Street to the east with access from Beech Lane at the rear. The grounds contain the former kitchen house, stables and servants cottage.

The house is symmetrical to Mill Street, and is constructed of Flemish bond face brickwork, with chamfered corners to openings and rendered courses at the base and above door heads. The building has verandahs to four sides, with the northern side and most of the southern side being enclosed, and the brickwork at the rear being painted. Verandahs have unlined corrugated iron skillion roofs and square posts, with some early chamfered posts with curved brackets surviving. French doors with fanlights open from most rooms, and the central main and rear entries consist of French doors with sidelights and fanlight.

Two dormer casement windows are located on the east and west, the sides of which are sheeted with corrugated iron. Moulded rendered eave brackets feature above the verandah roof, with the name CARLTON HOUSE in relief placed centrally on the east between brackets. Two rendered chimney stacks with similar bracket design are located within the hip on either side of the building.

Internally, the building has rendered masonry walls with a central hall from the front to the rear, a large room to either side on the east, and smaller rooms on the west. The main rooms have cedar joinery, including panelled doors with fanlights, architraves and skirtings, most of which has been painted. The building appears to have been substantially redecorated in the interwar period, with ornate light fixtures and pressed metal ceilings located in each room, and wallpaper with a hand-cut frieze in the hall and eastern rooms. Each eastern room has a marble fireplace surround which supports a decorative timber panel surrounding a mirror.

The western rooms have corner fireplaces, with a timber surround in the kitchen. A small bathroom has been inserted into a room under a stair, and has pressed metal ceilings and sheet metal shower surrounds. The stair is entered through an arch from the hall, and accesses the two attic bedrooms. These have timber boarding to the walls and ceilings, and timber fireplace surrounds. A bathroom is located in the northeast, and a kitchen in the southwest verandah enclosures.

Located to the west of the Carlton House, across a brick paved courtyard, is the former kitchen house. This single-storeyed, Flemish bond brick building has a gable and hipped corrugated iron roof and sash windows. The western side has a skillion roof verandah with brick floor, and is enclosed with a variety of materials including lattice, hardboard, chamferboard and glazing. The northern wall is of hardboard. Internally, the building is used as a self-contained flat, with hardboard lining and partition walls.

On the northern side of the courtyard space, at the rear of Carlton House, is the former servants cottage. This single-storeyed weatherboard building, with a hipped corrugated iron roof and timber stumps, has an enclosed southern verandah and small, western lean-to addition. The building has sash windows with curved metal window hoods.

To the west of the former kitchen house, and adjoining the western property boundary, is the former stables building. This corrugated iron gable roofed structure is constructed of brickwork to three sides, with the eastern side enclosed with corrugated iron and two narrow timber doors. The floor consists of stone flagging, and each wall has deep timber shelving. A corrugated iron lean-to garage is attached at the southern end.

A tank stand constructed of tree trunk posts is located on the southwestern side of Carlton House. A large deciduous tree is located to the north of Carlton House, and a tall palm is located near the eastern boundary.

== Heritage listing ==
Carlton House was listed on the Queensland Heritage Register on 31 October 1994 having satisfied the following criteria.

The place is important in demonstrating the evolution or pattern of Queensland's history.

Carlton House survives as an example of the pattern of the urban development of Toowoomba during the 1870s, in particular the development of the area adjacent to the railway yards.

The place is important in demonstrating the principal characteristics of a particular class of cultural places.

The building, with its former kitchen house and stables, is a substantially intact group which date from the 1870s and exhibit design and construction of that time. The main house includes intact interwar interior finishes and fittings.
