= Pigott's Building =

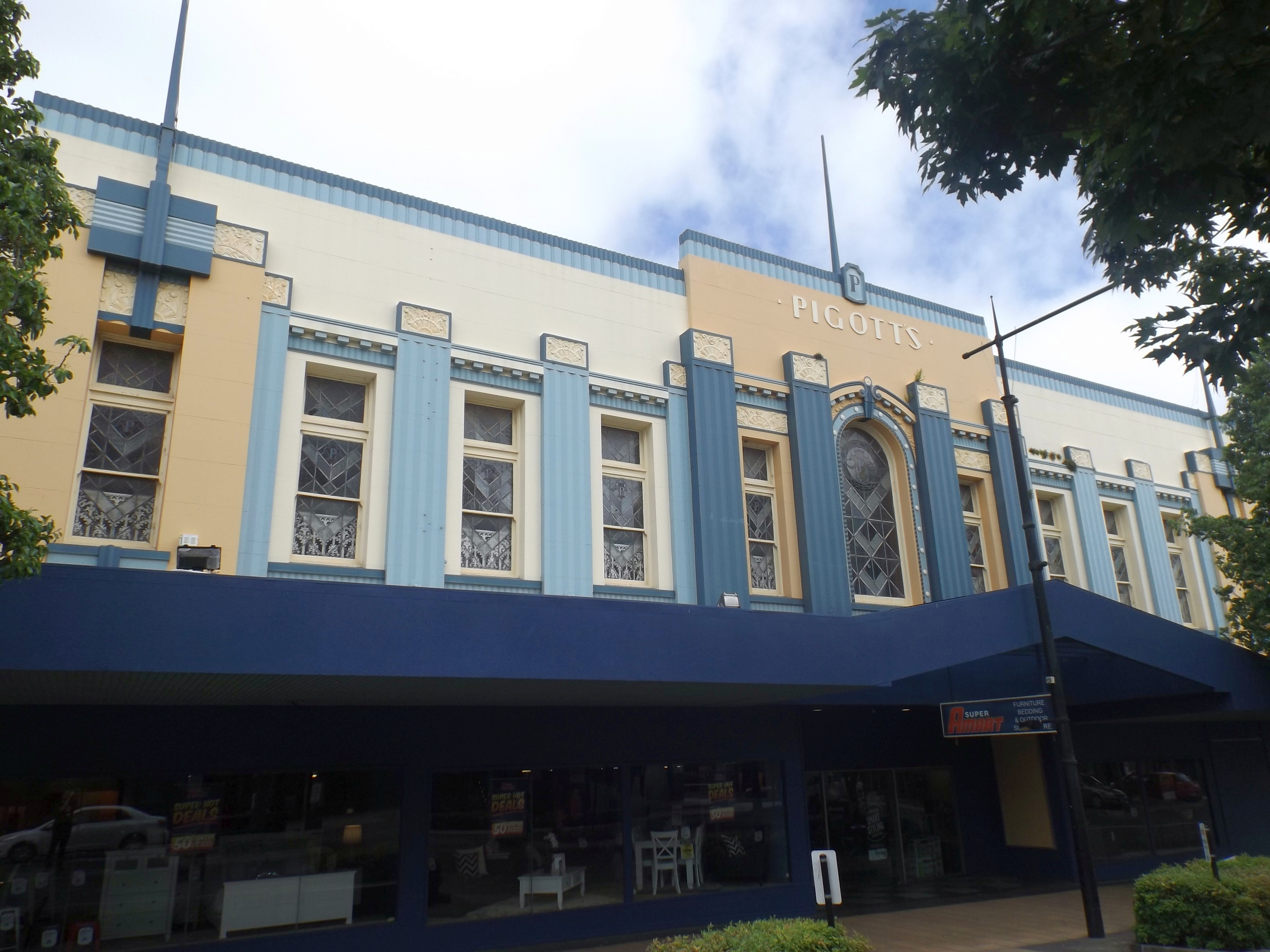
- Front of building from Ruthven Street, 2014

- Location within Queensland Location within Australia
- 27.56°S 151.9529°E
- Location: 381–391 Ruthven Street, Toowoomba, Queensland, Australia

History
- Design period: 1900–1914 (early 20th century)
- Built: 1910–1956

Site notes
- Architect: James Marks and Son

Queensland Heritage Register
- Official name: Pigott's Building, McDonnell and East, Piggott and Co
- Type: state heritage (built)
- Designated: 21 October 1992
- Reference no.: 600861
- Significant period: 1910s–1950s (fabric); 1902–1983 (historical use of site by Pigott & Co)
- Significant components: basement / sub-floor, elevator, furniture/fittings

Pigott's Building is a heritage-listed commercial building and former department store at 381–391 Ruthven Street, Toowoomba, Queensland, Australia. It was designed by Toowoomba firm James Marks and Son, and built in 1910 as the principal store of the Pigott & Co. department store chain, replacing an earlier 1902 store on the site that had burned down in 1909. The store was extended in 1914, 1935, 1956, and again in the 1960s.

The Pigott & Co. department store was Toowoomba's largest retail store by the 1950s, and expanded into foodstuff sales and a coffee lounge after the purchase of two adjacent properties in the 1960s. Pigott & Co. was sold to the Brisbane-based chain McDonnell and East in 1983, and operated as a department store under that name until they vacated the site in 1990. As of February 2013, the building was occupied by discount furniture and bedding store Super A-Mart. It was added to the Queensland Heritage Register on 21 October 1992.

== History ==
This two storeyed brick store was erected in several stages, the first in 1909–10, for MD Pigott, a successful Toowoomba draper.

The first Pigott's store was established by Michael Daniel Pigott at South Brisbane in 1886 and was run in partnership with TC Beirne. After the dissolution of the partnership, the two Irishmen opened rival drapery stores in Fortitude Valley. In 1896, Pigott opened a branch store in Russell Street, Toowoomba, which, after the sale of the Valley store to James McWhirter, in 1898, became his principal store. Branches were also opened at Warwick and other Darling Downs towns.

In 1902, Pigott and Co moved to rented premises on the present Ruthven Street site and extensive alterations and additions costing some £2,000 were carried out by local architects J Marks and Son in 1908. Following the fire on 8 July 1909, which substantially destroyed the two storeyed building, Pigott's was rebuilt with double the floor space and the Ruthven Street facade reinstated. The works, again carried out by J Marks and Son, included two light wells sited beneath roof skylights at the back and front of the store as well as roof ventilators patented by Harry Marks.

The site was purchased by Pigott and Co in 1914 and extensive additions by J Marks and Son were commenced. Three floors, connected by electric elevator, were added by contractor A Mayes to the southern side of the building enabling, on the ground floor, the extension of the manchester and dress departments, general office, and mail order department. The first floor contained the furniture department and tailoring and dress making work rooms; the smaller second floor was used as a bulk store room. A pneumatic cash cashier system, reputedly the first in Australia, and a complete sanitary system were installed.

In 1934 Pigott's acquired the adjoining block of land on Ruthven Street housing the Queen's Hotel. Part of the land was sold and on the remaining frontage to Ruthven Street was erected a two story addition with a new facade unifying the new work with the 1910/1914 building. The work was completed in 1936 at a cost of £16,000 included the installation of island windows and a Lamson pneumatic tube cash service. Architects were Brisbane firm, Hall and Phillips, who were prominent in department store design in the 1920s and 1930s, and builders Kell & Rigby.

By the 1950s the family business had become Toowoomba's largest retail store. Country clients remained a major part of the store's business with regular mail order catalogues published until this time. In 1950, interior remodelling was carried out and in 1956, Pigott's diamond jubilee year, a four storey extension costing some £100,000 was added to the rear of the building, allowing the department store to expand into new areas of merchandising.

In the 1960s, as part of a strategy to compete with changes in local retailing, Pigott's purchased the former Gordon Motors site, and later the adjoining Palmer's Garage, enabling the store to not only expand into other activities, such as the sale of foodstuffs and the opening of a coffee lounge but also giving access to Margaret Street, becoming Toowoomba's first three street store.

The store was leased in 1983 to McDonnell and East, who vacated it in 1990. The property was sold by Pigott and Co Pty Ltd in 1988.

== Description ==
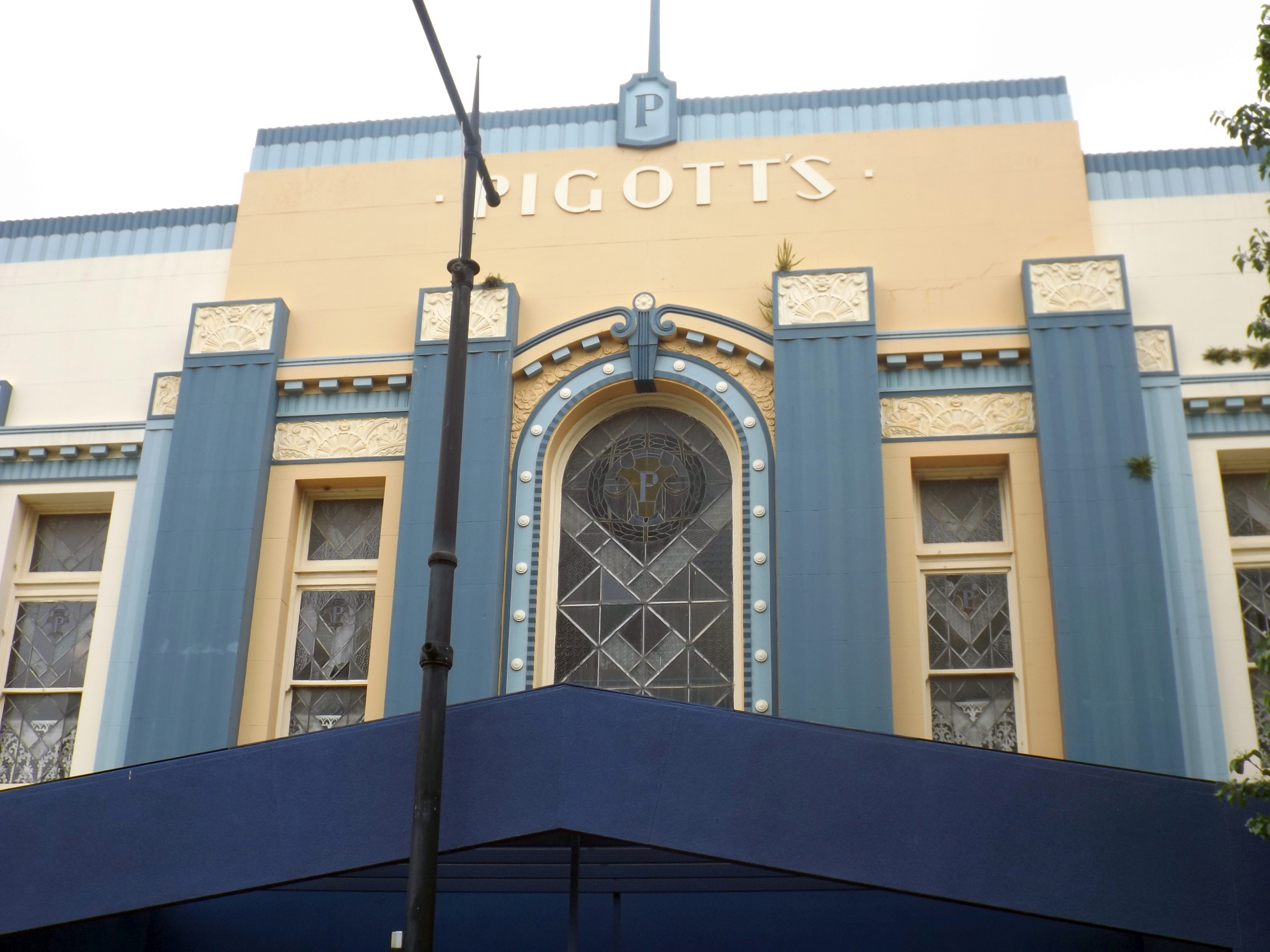
Building facade, 2014

Pigott's Building consists of two connected buildings, an older two-storeyed structure which fronts onto Ruthven Street and a single storeyed brick building on Margaret Street. Rear entry to both buildings is via a carpark to the west accessed from Victoria Street. The Ruthven Street building, a large rectangle in plan of approximately 30 by 82 metres (98 ft × 269 ft), is built to the site boundary on the street frontage and on the north and south alignments where it abuts the neighbouring buildings. The present structure is an agglomeration of the surviving parts of the first Pigotts Store built on the site and extensive additions and renovations carried out at various times.

The Ruthven Street building consists of two main storeys, a basement in the northeast corner and a smaller third storey at the rear. A predominantly masonry structure with parapet walls the building is roofed by a series of hipped corrugated iron or asbestos cement roofs with numerous skylights and sheet metal ventilators mounted along the ridges.

The symmetrical two-storeyed Ruthven Street facade retains the 1935 remodelling above the pavement awning. This painted and rendered masonry wall with stepped parapet and coloured leadlight windows features pilasters and mouldings embellished with floral and geometric patterns. The name of the store in plaster relief is positioned above a central arched window. Other first floor windows are rectangular sash windows with transom lights. Emblems ornamenting the facade advertise the Pigott's enterprise. The window glazing incorporates a decorative "P" for Pigotts insignia in a diagonal leaded pattern. The "P" also appears in the parapet and was once flown from the facade's three flagpoles. The modernised ground floor of the facade has a wide central entry with plate glass shop windows on either side.

The oldest part of the building is the southeast corner facing Ruthven Street with subsequent extensions made to the west and the north. The ground floor of this southeast section has been extensively remodelled with most decorative features removed and original columns replaced by round steel columns. The first floor retains much of the 1910 interior including timber posts and an elaborate pressed metal ceiling. This coved ceiling is divided into three vaulted bays which run east to west. Each vault is roofed by a corrugated iron hip roof and illuminated by skylights with rolled corrugated iron roofs.

An area of a similar size to the west of the southeast section is independently roofed with similar triple hip roofs with box gutters and skylights. The first floor in this area has a boarded timber ceiling which rakes up around the skylights. A further area to the west retains, on the ground floor, the original columns and pressed metal ceiling in a wide variety of patterns and has a diagonal boarded ceiling on the first floor.

A 1935 extension to the north has been modified by the addition of a mezzanine to the ground floor and the removal of much of the previously external wall to create a more open plan. The two-storeyed extension has a corrugated asbestos cement hip roof and four hipped roofed skylights. Plaster ceilings with art deco cornices are raked up around the skylights on the first floor.

A 1956 extension to the rear of the 1935 extension incorporates a basement floor and roof level. A concrete staircase with a metal balustrade that connects the four floors is lit via a recessed window wall. The building is serviced by two lifts, one on the north wall adjacent to the stair and one on the southern wall, and two centrally located escalators. A distinctive curved desk providing complex storage facilities is located at the front of the General Office on the first floor.

A two-storeyed brick addition to the northwest corner contains toilets and a staircase and connects the Ruthven Street building to the Margaret Street building.

== Heritage listing ==
Pigott's Building was listed on the Queensland Heritage Register on 21 October 1992 having satisfied the following criteria.

The place is important in demonstrating the evolution or pattern of Queensland's history.

Pigott's Building, Toowoomba, constructed in a number of stages between 1910 and 1956, is important in demonstrating the pattern of Queensland's history, with the growth of the store reflecting the development of Toowoomba as a major commercial centre.

The place demonstrates rare, uncommon or endangered aspects of Queensland's cultural heritage.

As a surviving example of an early 20th century department store interior with intact lighting and ventilation systems, it demonstrates a rare aspect of Queensland's cultural heritage.

The place is important in demonstrating the principal characteristics of a particular class of cultural places.

It is important in demonstrating the principal characteristics of a developing department store, in particular: the 1910, 1914, 1935 and 1956 fabric demonstrates changes in retail practice from compartmentalised department store to open plan trading; and the facade is an example in both the detailed ornament and overall image of the 1930s strategy of the department store facade as advertising emblem. It is important in demonstrating the principal characteristics of the commercial work of Toowoomba architects James Marks & Son and of Brisbane architects Hall and Phillips.

The place has a strong or special association with a particular community or cultural group for social, cultural or spiritual reasons.

The place has a strong and special association with Toowoomba and the Darling Downs, with Pigott and Co servicing both the town and country communities, via the mail order service.
