= White Horse Hotel, Toowoomba =

White Horse Hotel
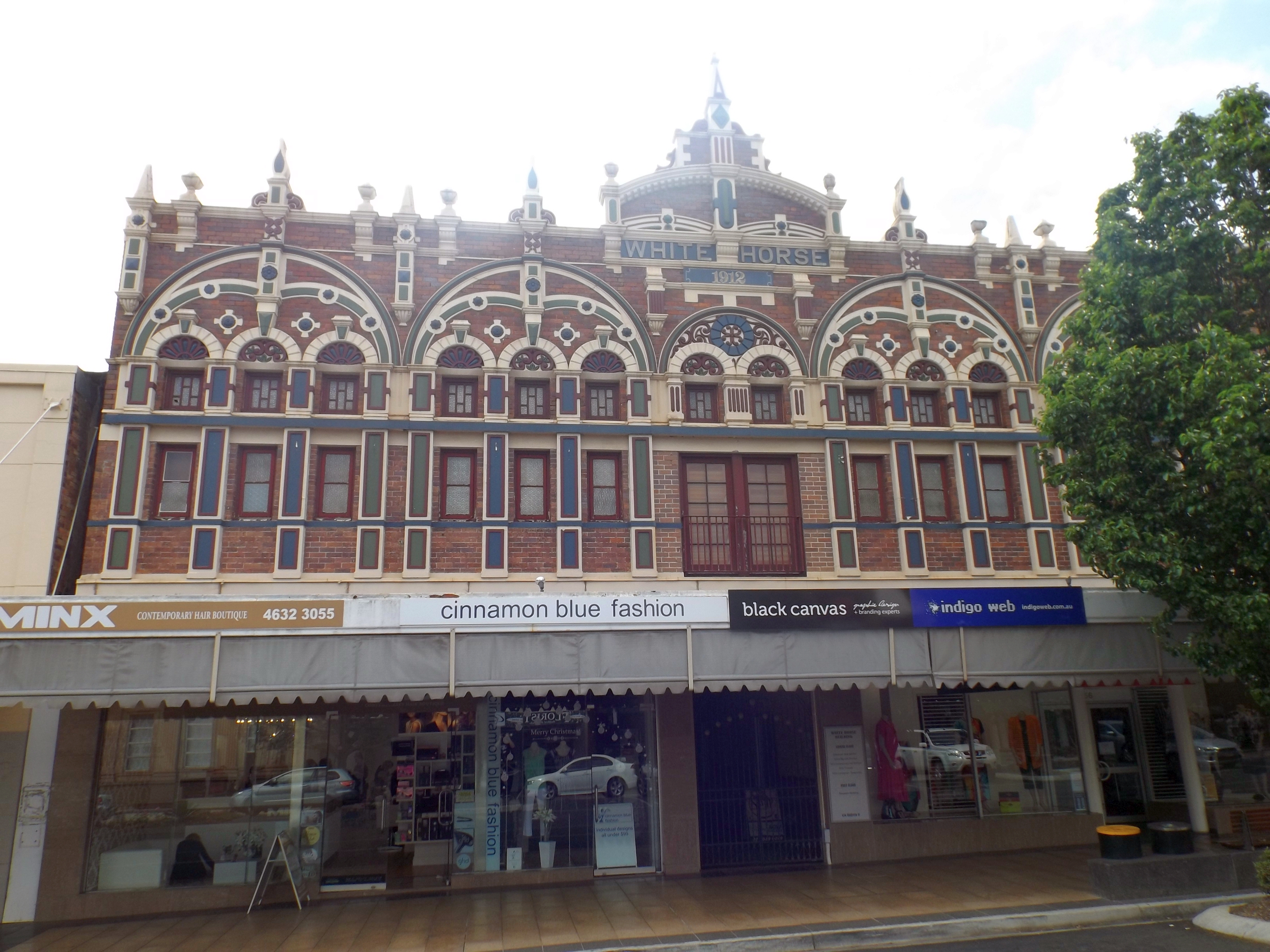
- Building exterior, 2014

- Location within Queensland Location within Australia
- 27.5615°S 151.9536°E
- Location: 456 Ruthven Street, Toowoomba, Queensland, Australia

History
- Design period: 1900–1914 (early 20th century)
- Built: c. 1900 – c. 1912

Queensland Heritage Register
- Official name: White Horse Hotel
- Type: state heritage (built)
- Designated: 17 December 1993
- Reference no.: 600863
- Significant period: 1900s, 1910s (fabric); 1866–1986 (historical operation of a White Horse Hotel)
- Significant components: fireplace

The White Horse Hotel is a heritage-listed former hotel at 456 Ruthven Street, Toowoomba, Queensland, Australia. A hotel known as the White Horse Hotel is known to have existed since 1866. The current two-storey building was built in stages, with much of the current fabric dating from renovations c. 1912, which included a new facade and the remodelling of both wings. The verandah overlooking Ruthven Street had been removed by 1978, and an additional room was built about this time.

The hotel closed in 1986, and the building was subsequently converted into shops and offices in major renovations in 1988. It was added to the Queensland Heritage Register on 17 December 1993. As of November 2009, the former hotel was occupied by two clothing stores and a hairdressing salon facing Ruthven Street, and an accountant's office elsewhere in the building.

== History ==
The White Horse Hotel is a two storeyed brick building on Toowoomba's main street, Ruthven Street. It was erected in several phases with major alterations c. 1912, including a new facade and internal refurbishing, attributed to Toowoomba architects, James Marks and Sons.

A hotel known as the White Horse Hotel is known to have existed on the site since 1866 when it was operated by Daniel Donovan. It was a two storeyed brick building with verandahs to Ruthven Street. In 1873, the property was acquired by Toowoomba storekeeper James Tant. After Tant's death, the hotel passed to his family and was operated by a number of licensees. In 1878, Louis Phillips is reported as running the White Horse Hotel, described as a well known and centrally located Hostelry with commercial rooms fitted with every convenience. Later licensees included John Long, who later built the Imperial Hotel, Daniel Schultz, and Edward Brosnan. In 1897, works costing £200 were undertaken by Toowoomba architect, William Hodgen and in 1906, tenders were called by James Marks and Son for improvements to the hotel.

The c. 1912 work is thought to be that of Reginald Marks, who from 1910–1917 worked with his father, James and brother, Harry. Reginald Marks is believed to have been responsible for the Taylor Building and Gaydon's Building in Toowoomba. Marks's building had a deep covered verandah which ran the length of the Ruthven Street elevation. Similar to the facade, it was ornately detailed. In common with many other Marks buildings it used ventilators designed by Harry Marks. Other substantial alterations to an earlier building appear to have been undertaken contemporaneously with the facade. Differences in ceiling treatments, some windows, chimneys, and detailing suggest that both wings of the hotel were remodelled at this time.

In 1914, the hotel was leased to William Hart, who advertised the hotel as the most central and comfortable hotel in the Queen City of Queensland with hot and cold baths and first class cuisine. In 1925, the hotel was acquired by John Donaghue. From 1924–1930 the hotel was leased to Albert George Callaghan. After Donaghue's death in 1930, the pub was run by his family.

By 1978, the verandah overlooking Ruthven Street had been removed and an awning was in place. About this time an extra ground floor room was created by enclosing the space between the Ruthven Street wing and the kitchen wing onto the rear lane, Jessie Street. In 1986, the hotel was closed. Extensive work was undertaken by the new owners to turn the pub into office and retail facilities. Work included the building of shops at ground level. The current owners acquired the property in 1988. Two ground floor shops fronting Ruthven Street are leased as clothing stores, whilst the rear kitchen area is used as a hairdressing salon.

== Description ==
The White Horse Hotel is a double storeyed parapeted brick building with a street facade which is richly decorated with white cement render trim. It consists of two wings which form a T shape; a north-south running wing which fronts onto Ruthven Street, with an adjoining east-west wing extending to the rear. The roof is corrugated iron, made up of a combination of gabled and hipped roofs, with pot-bellied shaped ornamental chimneys and ventilators. The ground floor has been extensively refurbished (c. 1988) and contains two shops either side of a central entrance, a shop to the rear, and a now disused annex in the south east corner. The upper floor contains now mostly unused hotel rooms and offices.

On the ground floor, a central entrance passage leads to an entrance hall containing a finely turned and carved silky oak staircase. Both the passage and the entrance hall have pressed metal ceilings, and the stair soffit is decorated with a pressed metal panel. The shop at the rear contains a carved timber fireplace, and to its southwest corner, a room with a large fireplace recess and a pressed metal ceiling.

The stairs lead to a generous foyer on the upper floor which links the two wings of rooms, and has pressed metal ceilings. Arched timber double doors to the south of the foyer lead to a corridor with a delicately patterned plaster ceiling. The corridor gives access to small rooms, each with similar ceilings to the corridor, and metal ceiling roses.

The northern wing contains substantially larger rooms accessed by an east-west corridor which also has delicate decorative plaster detailing. The doorways to the corridors are framed in rendered masonry with cement scrolls. The rooms to the north retain their fine plaster decoration and metal ceiling roses, and are well lit with rectangular casement windows with square fixed-light timber windows above them. The southern rooms retain none of these features. The south and northern rooms are linked by a small entry hall with timber French doors opening onto a balconette, and square timber windows above.

The white cement render elements to the facade form a rich tracery over the brickwork. Pilasters rise above the street awnings, finishing in small arches over square windows. These are spanned in groups of three by larger arches bisected with finial-like pilasters. Central paired windows are surmounted by a curved pediment which also has a finial-like projection, and the words "White Horse 1912" inscribed upon it. The white render pattern is elaborated with curls, scrolls and floral motifs, and the parapet is decorated with varied acroteria. The facade makes a picturesque aesthetic contribution to Ruthven Street.

== Heritage listing ==
White Horse Hotel was listed on the Queensland Heritage Register on 17 December 1993 having satisfied the following criteria.

The place is important in demonstrating the evolution or pattern of Queensland's history.

There has been a White Horse Hotel on this site since 1866, and the place is significant historically for its association with the growth of Toowoomba as a regional rural centre since that time.

The place is important in demonstrating the principal characteristics of a particular class of cultural places.

It is important in demonstrating the principal characteristics of an early 20th century hotel, in particular the flamboyant facade and interior elements such as the main stair, pressed metal ceilings, doorways, and fanlights.

The place is important because of its aesthetic significance.

It is important in exhibiting a range of aesthetic characteristics valued by the community, in particular the rich decorative detail of the facade makes a picturesque contribution to Ruthven Street; it also contains some fine decorative elements, in particular the pressed metal and plaster ceilings and silky oak staircase.

The place has a special association with the life or work of a particular person, group or organisation of importance in Queensland's history.

It has a special association with the work of Toowoomba architects James Marks and Sons, as a good example of their commercial work.
