= Elphin, Toowoomba =

Elphin
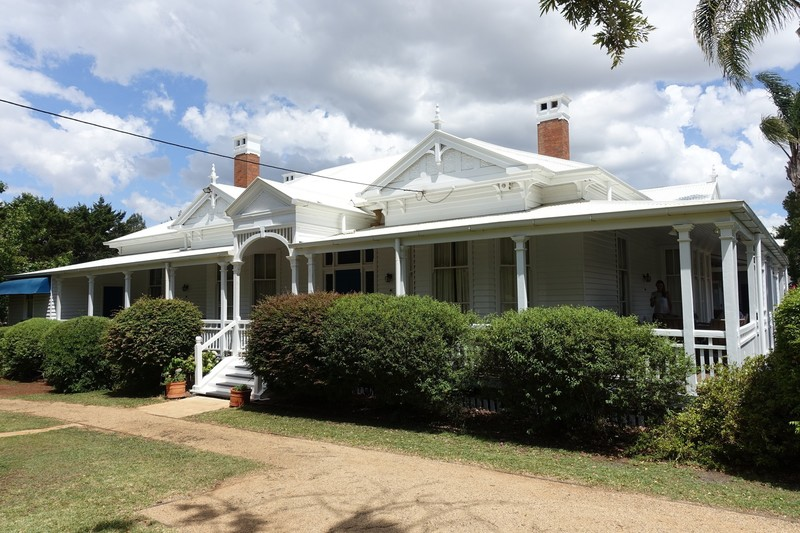
- Elphin, 2018

- Location within Queensland Location within Australia
- 27.559°S 151.9415°E
- Location: 24 Anzac Avenue, Newtown, Toowoomba, Toowoomba Region, Queensland, Australia

History
- Design period: 1900–1914 (early 20th century)
- Built: 1907

Site notes
- Architect: William Hodgen

Queensland Heritage Register
- Official name: Elphin
- Type: state heritage (landscape, built)
- Designated: 28 July 2000
- Reference no.: 601326
- Significant period: 1900s (fabric, historical)
- Significant components: garden/grounds, garage, service wing, lead light/s, driveway, shed – storage, residential accommodation – main house

Elphin is a heritage-listed villa at 24 Anzac Avenue, Newtown, Toowoomba, Toowoomba Region, Queensland, Australia. It was designed by William Hodgen and built in 1907. It was added to the Queensland Heritage Register on 28 July 2000.

== History ==
Elphin on tree lined Anzac Avenue, Toowoomba, is large low-set single storey residence designed by prolific Toowoomba architect William Hodgen for Longreach pastoralist Andrew Crombie and his wife Ellen in 1907.

William Hodgen established his Toowoomba practice with an advertisement in the Darling Downs Gazette of 6 February 1897 announcing he was a new architect for Toowoomba. Growth and development in both Toowoomba and the Downs and his own efficient work meant he soon had a busy and successful practice. While trained in Queensland, his London experiences and knowledge of the Arts and Crafts and Edwardian Classicism were expressed in some of his buildings. However, he tended to employ a Free style, modifying the prevailing Queensland vernacular by introducing individualist elements. His English experiences are reflected in the classicist detailing of entrance pediments using timber, joinery and internal fittings. His Toowoomba works include Kensington, Tor, Austral Hall, Glennie School, Ascot House and Defiance Flour Mill. He was also responsible for buildings in Brisbane and other parts of the state such as the Allora grandstand, Oakey Post Office, Jondaryn Queensland National Bank, and the Hotel Corones, Charleville.

For Elphin, Hodgen designed an L-shaped house; the front core had a 9-foot-6-inch (2.90 m) wide veranda on three sides. Either side of the 8-foot (2.4 m) entrance hall was the main bedroom and drawing room. The drawing room and dining room shared a fireplace as did the master and second bedroom. Between the second and third bedrooms was a bay-windowed workroom, these rooms overlooked the side garden. Another bedroom, bathroom and boxroom were at the rear and opened off an internal central passageway. The 15-foot (4.6 m) wide service wing stretching out behind the house contained the pantry, kitchen and laundry, extending of this was a storeroom and servant's room. The house cost £1,236/19/3.

Hodgen also designed stables at the rear of the property for Crombie's Drayton Road property that cost £133. This weatherboard building had corrugated iron roof and gables and included a main room, coach house, harness room, feed room, workshop and cow shed.

Both Andrew and Ellen Crombie were born in Tasmania, however, they started married life in New South Wales in October 1874, where he was managing a large property. In 1882 he and his partners purchased Strathdarr Station near Longreach. With his wife, governess, maid, two daughters and son, Crombie moved north to manage this new enterprise. While Longreach pastoral life was not easy with floods, droughts and bushfires he was very successful. Crombie in his book, After sixty years, or, Recollections of an Australian bushman, mentioned that he and CW Little of Coreena Station were the first to ship frozen sheep from Queensland to London on the owner's account. Crombie, in 1889, was a founder of the first graziers association of Queensland, the Pastoral Employer's Association of Queensland. Moreover, Crombie who was involved in the life of his locality also served on the local Aramac Divisional Board.

Andrew Crombie believed in preserving buildings from the past for future generations. In his book he reminisced that he was quite devastated when a pioneers' hut was needlessly destroyed by a property manager "who was utterly devoid of sentiment in connection with pioneers and their great achievements".

While Andrew Crombie retained his pastoral properties until the mid-1910s the family also had a town house in Toowoomba by the early 1900s. It was in 1907 that they acquired land on Drayton Road, Newtown, to build their own large home on over 3 acres (1.2 ha) of land. The house was named after Elphin near Launceston, where Ellen Crombie (née Richardson) was born in 1849. The Crombies were part of Toowoomba's society and the house was eminently suitable for entertaining and for Mrs Crombie to hold her regular "at homes".

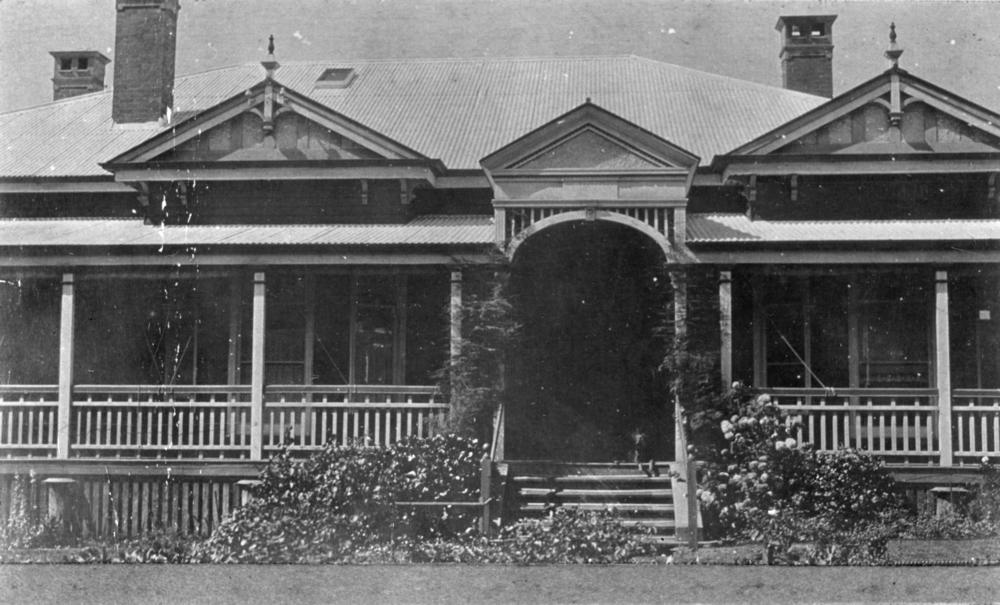
Elphin residence on Anzac Avenue, Toowoomba, 1924

It was during his retirement that Andrew Crombie wrote his reminiscences which were published in serial form under the title of "Pioneering days" in The Queenslander during 1924 and 1925. Subsequently, Watson Ferguson published his work in book form, as After sixty years, or, Recollections of an Australian bushman in 1927.

Bottle merchant and sports enthusiast Ernest James (Jim) Busby became the owner/occupant in April 1937. He used the extensive back yard for his business. He developed facilities included an office and a bottle washing shed, while in the fenced-off bottle yard were extensive racks for bottles and a boiler shed.

During World War II the house was the home of James (Jim) Busby and became a second home to US servicemen with frequent social events.

Elphin was converted into four flats by 1952, two of which were occupied by Jim and one by his son Ernest Busby, while the fourth was occupied by the family housekeeper. The family converted the property to a rental property over the years 1949–1952 as the son then father moved to new modern homes. When Jim Busby died in 1953 he was living in James Street and his children did not sell this revenue-producing property until 1988. Because Elphin was put up for auction, various articles were published in The Chronicle during January 1988, most called it a "homestead". The bottle business which serviced western Queensland continued at the property for another year after its sale. Ernest Thomas Busby (son of Jim) continued his business at Elphin until the business was sold prior to his death in 1985.

According to The Chronicle of 16 January 1988 the house had 15 rooms, including four main bedrooms, two servants' bedrooms plus a guest room. Features included leadlight fanlights and windows, pressed metal ceilings and nine fireplaces. An extensive electronic maid call system was still in working order in the early 50s. It was very advanced for the time identifying the calling room.

The house was sold before auction to a local businessman and his wife who refurbished it as a family home. Elphin was selected to be on the 1993 Heritage Building Society calendar because the society's chairman claimed, in The Chronicle of 25 November 1992, that they only desired "those buildings which are examples of rich history of imaginative architecture for which Queensland is known".

== Description ==
Elphin is a large low-set single-storey weatherboard home, set well back from the road and located on a large block on Anzac Avenue, Newtown, Toowoomba.

Elphin is L-shaped in plan and asymmetrical on all elevations. A classical gable pediment in timber over the front steps separates a pair of gables that project from the medium-pitched corrugated iron hip core roof. The pair of gables have the 1920s half-timbered appearance, and both are enhanced with a turned-timber finial and pendant. There are four brick chimneys with double rendered tops.

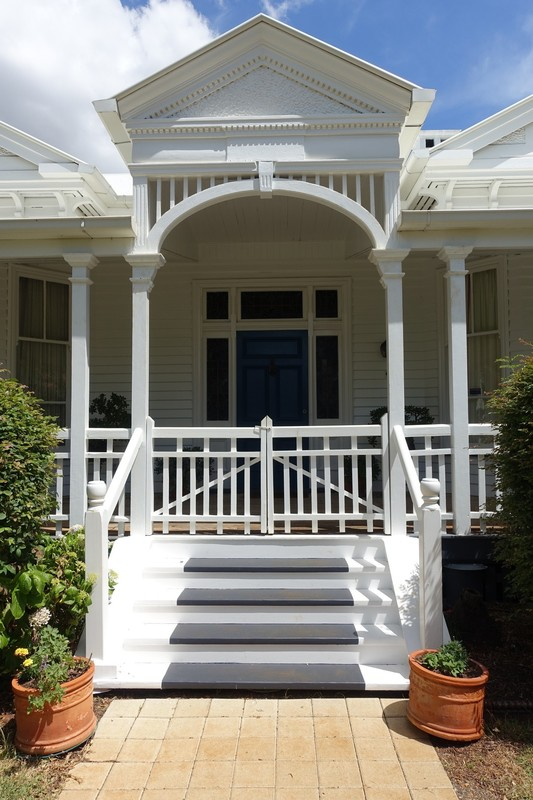
Entrance, 2018

The front of the house is nine veranda bays long. To the right of the entrance is it three bays in width and there are five bays on the other side. Simple posts with astragal and capitals support the skillion verandah roof which is stepped down from the main roof. The verandah is edged with a triple rail dowel balustrade and is open except for the end bay on the left side. This pavilioned room still has a type of metal sunhood. The entry has a five-panelled front door with fanlight and is flanked by sidelights above a timber panel. All windows opening onto the encircling veranda have step-through windows.

There are gables projecting from the core on both side elevations and these repeat the front gable's decorative features.

The large front garden contains a mixture of mature and recent plantings. A long paved drive down the right hand side leads to the old garage and shed at the very rear of the property.

A bore was present approximately 15 metres (49 ft) to the north east of the building which continued to be utilised in the 1940s to 60s. Pumping was by a large windmill. During WWII a large underground air raid shelter was constructed to the east of the main house. To the south (eastern end) of the house was a large glass plant conservatorium. Two large elevated water tanks were sited to the rear of the house.

The office and storage room, and bottle washing facility were sited in the original stables to the rear of the property. The bottle washing plant included an extremely early automatic steam driven bottle washer and steriliser.

== Heritage listing ==
Elphin was listed on the Queensland Heritage Register on 28 July 2000 having satisfied the following criteria.

The place is important in demonstrating the evolution or pattern of Queensland's history.

Andrew Crombie was a progressive pastoralist involved in promoting the export of frozen lamb and establishing the first graziers association. Elphin was built as the town house for his wife and family and was primarily entertainment. For pastoralists and other rural people Toowoomba was important as social and education centre and place to move to when retiring from the land.

That Elphin has been the large home of a wealthy pastoralist, home and business premises of a bottle merchant, used as flats and is again a home, demonstrates the changing usages of residential properties.

The place is important in demonstrating the principal characteristics of a particular class of cultural places.

Elphin is a large low-set timber house designed by Toowoomba architect William Hodgen in 1907 for Andrew Crombie. Elphin is an excellent example of a large Toowoomba timber home that was designed by prominent architect William Hodgen.

The place is important because of its aesthetic significance.

The siting of the house, the design of the building, its fine classical detailing and layout of the garden with its mature plantings exhibited aesthetic characteristics of the early 1900s that are still valued by the community.
