= Wislet =

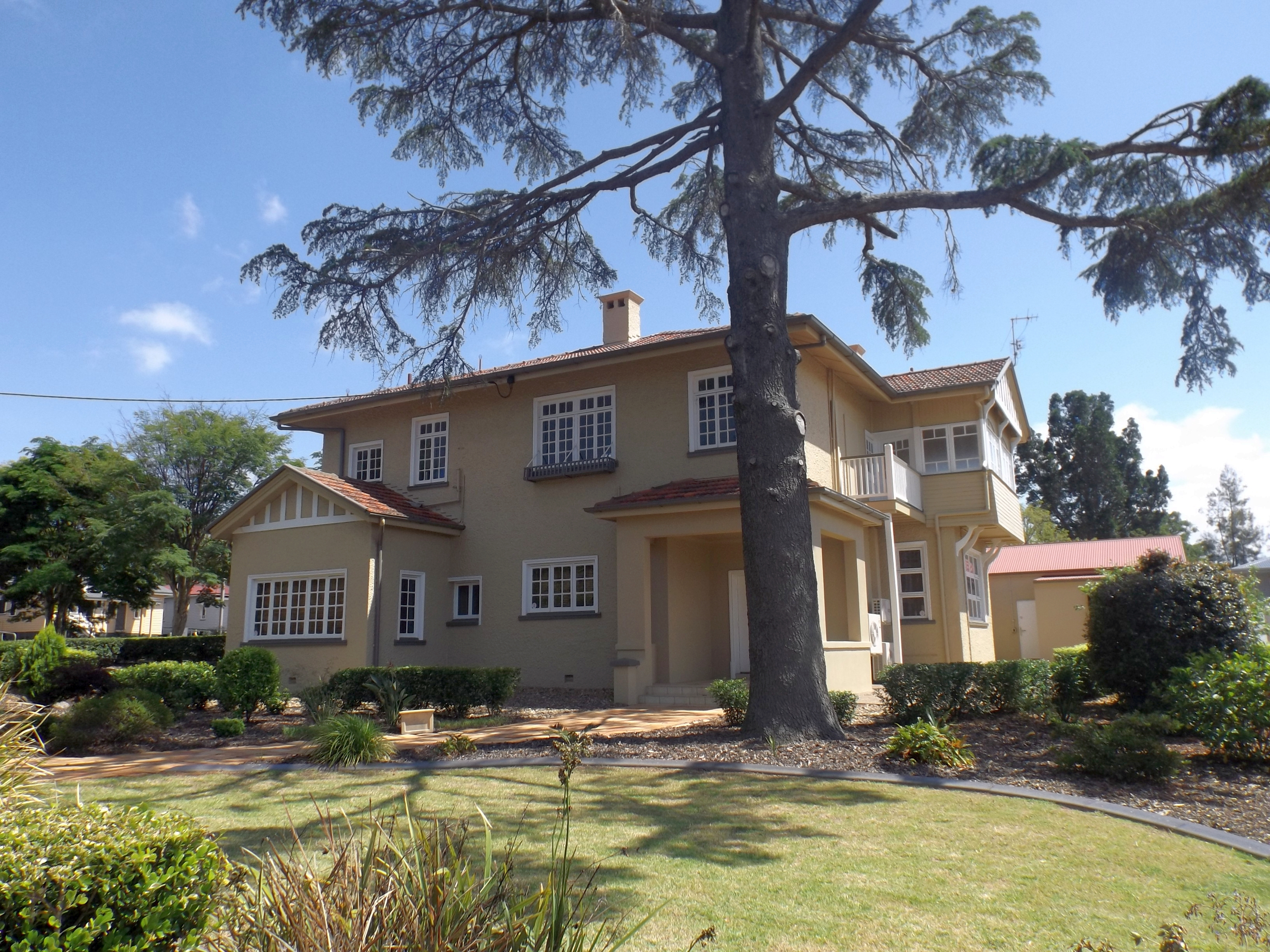
- As seen from Russell Street, 2014

- Location within Queensland Location within Australia
- 27.5579°S 151.9479°E
- Location: 127 Russell Street, Toowoomba, Toowoomba Region, Queensland, Australia

History
- Design period: 1900–1914 (early 20th century)
- Built: 1908–1930s?

Site notes
- Architect: William Hodgen

Queensland Heritage Register
- Official name: Wislet (Former Wesley Hospital), Drynane, Wislet
- Type: state heritage (landscape, built)
- Designated: 30 May 2003
- Reference no.: 601324
- Significant period: 1900s–1930s circa (fabric); 1908–1998 (historical, social)
- Significant components: lawn/s, trees/plantings, residential accommodation – staff quarters, hall, garage, consulting rooms, lead light/s, garden – bed/s, residential accommodation – main house, service wing

Wislet is a heritage-listed detached house and former hospital at 127 Russell Street, Toowoomba, Toowoomba Region, Queensland, Australia. It was designed by William Hodgen junior and was built in 1908 for Dr Freidrich Hinrichsen and his wife, Dori, in 1908, as a large two-story building combining a residence and medical suite. It was thereafter sold to two other Toowoomba doctors: Thomas Connolly in 1910, who renamed the property Drynane, and John Hulme in 1948.

In 1963, the property was sold to the Methodist Church, who established the Wesley Hospital in the building. The ownership of the hospital passed to the Uniting Church in Australia in 1980, and it operated until 1998, when the church deemed it no longer viable. It was added to the Queensland Heritage Register on 30 May 2003.

== History ==
Wislet is a large, two storey, rendered masonry building designed by architect William Hodgen jnr. and located in Russell Street, Toowoomba. It is situated on a large block, originally part of suburban allotment 9 "at the swamp near Drayton". This parcel of land of twenty three acres, two roods and thirty six perches was purchased by James Taylor in 1868 from William Horton who held the original deed of grant from 1852. James Taylor began to subdivide the land and the blocks passed through the hands of several owners.

In April 1908, the Certificate of Title was transferred to Dori Helene Hinrichsen, wife of Dr Freidrich Hinrichsen. At the same time, the Hinrichsens purchased an adjoining easement of 3.3 perches. At the beginning of 1908, the Hinrichsens commissioned Toowoomba architect William Hodgen jnr. to design a combined residence and surgery. The tender amount was £2125 and the building contractor was Henry Andrews. The house was adjacent to a house known as "The Rosery" which was owned by Dr Freshney, medical superintendent of Toowoomba Hospital 1892–1927, and it appears that the Hinrichsens built their house on the rose garden of this house.

Hodgen's original drawings show that the house was carefully designed to accommodate both Dr Hinrichsen's medical practice and the family's residence. The medical suite comprised three rooms – a waiting room, consulting room and operating room and had its own entrance on the western side of the front elevation. A large, arched porch on the eastern side marked the entrance to the residence. This leads into a vestibule that linked together the medical suite and residence. A grand, central "hall dominated the ground floor of the residence. The hall measured 22 by 16 feet with a raised platform of 14 by 6 feet at one end. This platform was enclosed with leadlight windows to the east. Extensive servants quarters and service areas were also located on the ground floor, including a servant's hall, bedroom and bathroom as well as kitchen, laundry, pantry and store. A stable building and wood-house to the back of the block were part of the original design.

The upper floor accommodated the family's living spaces. The southern side was occupied by a large bedroom, dressing room and bathroom. The northern side had another bedroom and night and day nurseries. The night nursery had a small balcony perched over the roof of the ground floor and the day nursery is connected to a large north-east facing porch. Both these spaces demonstrate the emphasis that was then placed on fresh air for good health.

The Toowoomba Chronicle reported in 1973 that the Hinrichsens had designed their home to resemble their former home in Germany and that the Toowoomba residence was "a stately 22 room house... ...In what was once the drawing room of the old home is still to be found a coat of arms depicting a hunting party scene with lean hounds on leashes. The crest of blue-green mosaic tiles stands above a marble fireplace and includes the initials F.J.H. The marble for the fireplace was quarried from Dr Henrickson's (sic) family estate in Germany... ...Dr and Mrs Henrickson were reputed to be very talented musically and were devotees of the arts."

It is not known when Dr Hinrichsen arrived in Australia, however, it appears that he was first registered as a doctor in Queensland in 1904. He was a well qualified man. The Medical Board of Queensland's registration records show that he passed the Staats Examen in Germany in 1897 and obtained his MD from the University of Rostock, Mecklenburg in 1899. He was formerly known by the name of Cohen. He worked as a surgeon in Munich, Leipzig, Rostock and Berlin. He is listed as Honorary Surgeon to the Toowoomba General Hospital and presented a paper at the Australian Medical Congress in Melbourne in 1908. In 1911, Loxton's Medical Directory listed Dr Hinrichsen in practice in Roma. In November 1914, he was struck off the roll by order of the Medical Board, which lends credibility to local stories that he had been forced out of Toowoomba as a result of anti-German feeling during the time of the First World War.

William Hodgen jnr had a long and prolific architectural career in Toowoomba. The son of a building contractor, Hodgen became a cadet in the Colonial Architect's Office in 1886. In 1891, he resigned and travelled to London to broaden his experience. He enrolled at the Architectural Association and worked for a variety of architects in London, becoming an Associate of the Royal Institute of British Architects in 1895. He returned to Queensland in December 1896 and opened his practice in February 1897, remaining in practice with his sons until his death in 1943. Hodgen's time in London coincided with a period of intense creativity and originality in English architecture, with the likes of Charles Voysey, William Lethaby and Edward Schroeder Prior designing key works of Arts and Crafts architecture. Although Hodgen's work reflects more fully the influence of his Queensland training and the local timber tradition, he does integrate up-to-date Arts and Crafts features and details into his work, some of which can be seen in the house in Russell Street. His unbuilt work is more strident in its application of English styles of the 1890s. An unrealised design of 1897 for a theatre in Toowoomba has typical Arts and Crafts elements such as asymmetrical planning and massing, "green slate" roof, centrally located roof lantern and facade treatments such as stone dressing and carved stone decoration at first level.

In January 1910 the house was purchased by Thomas Connolly, also a medical practitioner. He named it "Drynane" after his birthplace in County Armagh in Ireland. The Connolly family held the title until 1948 when the house was sold to Dr John Hulme, a colleague of Dr Connolly's, who resided and operated his medical practice there until 1963. In 1963, the property was sold to the Methodist Church who initially established an acute care hospital. The title transferred to the Uniting Church in Australia in 1980. From 1979–1984, the Uniting Church purchased many of the properties around the site of the hospital. The Wesley Hospital operated until July 1998 when the Uniting Church announced that they could no longer operate the hospital as "there is little chance that the hospital could be viable in today's market". The Toowoomba Chronicle reported that some staff members had been at the hospital for more than 25 years.

== Description ==
Wislet is a two storeyed rendered masonry building originally designed as a residence and surgery, located on Russell Street to the north of the rail line through Toowoomba. The house stands on a large allotment of about half an acre and is set back from Russell Street with an established garden. A large pine tree dominates the Russell Street frontage of the former residence.

The house is an imposing and stark addition to the Russell Street precinct which, in this area to the north of the business district, is characterised by more ornate residences. The more contemporary house on the eastern side of the former Hospital has been designed to complement the former hospital.

The floor plan of the original part of the former residence was rectangular with a one storeyed rectangular wing to the rear, with projecting windows and entrance vestibules from most of the facades. To the rear of the ground floor of the original footprint of the building, additions have been made over time and this wing is now an amalgam of differently aged and constructed sections.

The building is of loadbearing masonry construction, rendered with roughcast stucco. The openings of the building are generally timber framed casement windows, occasionally filled with leadlight or coloured glass. The window openings generally have face brick sills. The hipped and gabled roof of the two storeyed part of the building is clad with red terracotta tiles and is punctuated by a number of chimney stacks. The rear one storeyed wing is clad with corrugated iron. The chimney stacks are rough cast, to complement the render of the facades of the building, and are evocative of Art Nouveau elongated chimneys with narrow cornices and high level square openings beneath the cornice.

The principal facade of the former Hospital, facing southward to Russell Street, is unusual in the asymmetry and loose control of the fenestration and projecting features. The facade addresses Clifford House on the opposite side of Russell Street and is similar in massing. The facade of the building has two ground floor projecting features; a gabled roofed projection housing a four panel casement window on the western end and a smaller hipped roofed, enclosed entrance porch on the eastern end. Between these elements on the ground floor is a three panel casement window and a smaller, more recent sliding window. The first floor is lined with a number of variously sized and placed windows on the principal facade, including a central four panel casement decorated with a window planter box.

The eastern, side facade of the building is dominated by a projecting oriel window of German influence at the northern end. The window sits above a ground floor projecting bay which features a large 3 by 4 panel of timber framed leadlight window on the face of the projection and similar panels on the returns. The leadlight panels in blue and warm grey shades demonstrate Art Nouveau influence. Some of the glazed panels have been replaced in plate glass. Surmounting this projection is the timber framed and horizontal boarded rectangular planned oriel window supported on large curved timber brackets. The timber element is lined with timber framed casement windows filled with arctic glass and, seemingly, later than the other window openings of the building. The oriel window is roofed under the main gabled roof which terminates at the window and has a stuccoed and battened gable end slightly projecting from the face of the projecting window bay and again, supported on curved timber brackets. The boarding and glazing may date from a more recent renovation. Extending from the southern side of the oriel window is a small timber balcony supported on a single timber column and surrounded on its open sides with a timber battened balustrade. An external narrow metal stair from the ground level terminates at this small balcony.

The western face of the building is almost devoid of openings, except for two square openings filled with coloured glass giving external expression to the stair hall. The one storeyed wing at the rear of the western side is lined on the northern and eastern sides with wide verandahs which have been enclosed and now form internal rooms. The rear, northern facade of the building has a hipped projection at the western end and is lined on the first floor with variously sized casement window openings.

Generally, the interior has a mixture of timber boarded and concrete floors on the ground floor and timber boarded floors on the first floor. The interior walls of the ground floor are rendered masonry and the internal walls of the first floor are mostly rendered masonry with some timber boarded partitioning. The ceilings of the ground floor are rendered plaster and plasterboard and the ceilings on the first floor are timber boarded. Generally, the interior of the ground floor has been altered both in finish and planning and the interior of the first floor is more intact. Features such as the ground floor fireplaces, coat of arms and the platform in the hall are no longer there.

The first floor is accessed internally via a stair on the western side of the building which is housed in a hall lit by two square stair hall windows, filled with orange and yellow leadlight panels. The dog leg timber stair has a timber battened balustrade with square timber newel and turning posts which are decorated with a simple carved border detail at the top. The stair terminates at the western end of a transverse hall on the first floor, from which the major first floor rooms are accessed. A section of the partitioning of this hall, adjacent to the stair is constructed from timber boarding. The first floor of the building houses a number of large rooms with intact joinery, including a simple skirting board, picture rail, high mid-railed timber doors with brass hardware and a number of fireplaces. The design of the fireplaces is clearly influenced by Art Nouveau, with elongated vertical proportions, simple detailing and oversized bracket elements.

The garden surrounding the building contributes to its setting, and in the case of the front garden reinforces the German influence. A large pine tree dominates the front garden and partially conceals the house from the street. Other features in the front and eastern garden include hedges and garden beds with shrubbery. The western garden comprises a large flat lawned area, possibly the remnants of an early tennis court.

To the rear of the house is a one storeyed timber framed and clad shed with simple gabled corrugated iron roof and several timber boarded doors and a large timber garage door.

== Heritage listing ==
Wislet (Former Wesley Hospital) was listed on the Queensland Heritage Register on 30 May 2003 having satisfied the following criteria.

The place is important in demonstrating the evolution or pattern of Queensland's history.

The former Wesley Hospital is important in demonstrating the development of Toowoomba, in particular the development of the district to the north of the central business district where a number of doctor's residences and private hospitals were located in the first half of the century.

The former Wesley Hospital has a strong association with the medical profession in Toowoomba. A succession of local doctors operated their practices and resided in the house from 1908. As the Wesley Hospital, the building provided medical care to the Toowoomba community for 35 years.

The place has a special association with the life or work of a particular person, group or organisation of importance in Queensland's history.

The former Wesley Hospital has a strong association with the medical profession in Toowoomba. A succession of local doctors operated their practices and resided in the house from 1908. As the Wesley Hospital, the building provided medical care to the Toowoomba community for 35 years.
