= Hotel Corones =

Hotel Corones, Charleville
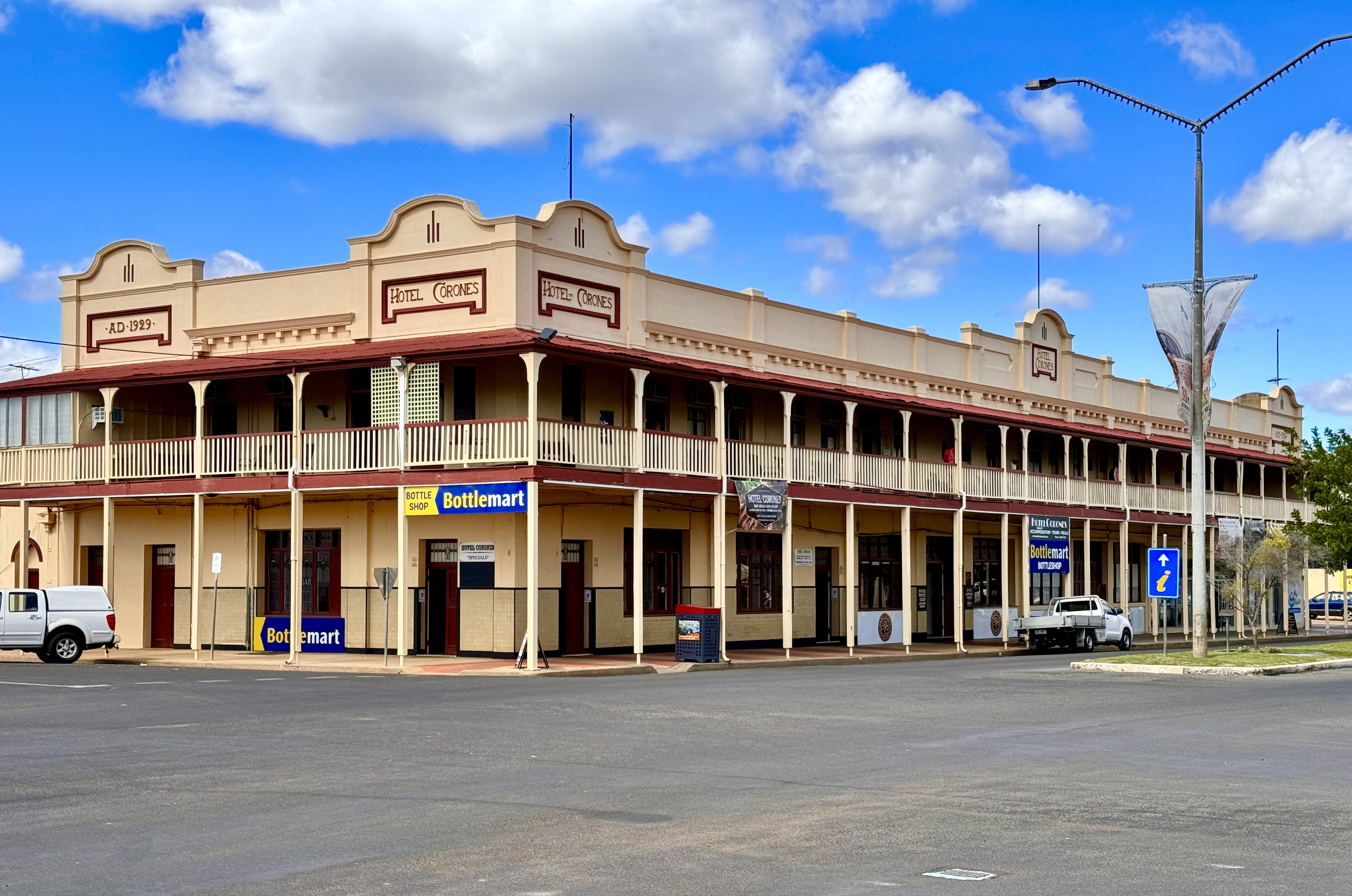
- Hotel Corones, 2024

- Location within Queensland
- 26.4025°S 146.2411°E
- Location: 33 Wills Street, Charleville, Shire of Murweh, Queensland, Australia

History
- Design period: 1919–1930s (interwar period)
- Built: 1924–1929

Site notes
- Architect: William Hodgen junior

Queensland Heritage Register
- Official name: Hotel Corones, Charleville, Corones Hotel Norman
- Type: state heritage (built)
- Designated: 1 July 1997
- Reference no.: 601282
- Significant period: 1920s (fabric); 1924–ongoing (historical, social use)
- Significant components: hall, ballroom, lead light/s, furniture/fittings
- Builders: Day labour

Hotel Corones is a heritage-listed hotel at 33 Wills Street, Charleville, Shire of Murweh, Queensland, Australia. It was designed by William Hodgen junior and built from 1924 to 1929 by day labour. It is also known as Corones Hotel Norman. It was added to the Queensland Heritage Register on 1 July 1997.

== History ==
The town of Charleville was surveyed in 1867 following the surveying of a number of pastoral runs in the district in 1863. Sited on the banks of the Warrego River along a natural stock route from New South Wales to Western Queensland, the town was to develop as the major service centre for the surrounding pastoral industry. Bullock teams passed through the town, Cobb & Co established stables (as well as a factory for the construction of mail coaches and buggies and an associated sawmill) and in 1888 Charleville's position as a strategic transport node for the south west was confirmed when it became the terminus for the Western railway line (extended south to Cunnamulla in 1898 and west to Quilpie in 1917).

The first half of the 1920s was a time of economic prosperity in Queensland unrivalled for three decades. The boom was sustained longer in the building sector than in others; and in Brisbane the transformation of the city's central business district was a tangible legacy of the boom. In Charleville the main streets gave an air of solid prosperity to this centre of one of the richest areas of western Queensland:

... it has fine hotels, stores, offices of the leading pastoral firms, and a full complement of general business concerns. There is a most attractive School of Arts, Town Hall, [and] three churches ... There is a most excellent club, the "Warrego" ...

The fledgling Qantas commenced their first commercial services from the town in 1922 ("replacing" the last Cobb & Co coach which ran in 1920); in 1924 the town turned on electric lights; and in 1926 a new Town Hall was completed. However a severe drought in 1926 described by the Charleville Chamber of Commerce as the worst season known by black or white man with losses of sheep to the enormous extent of eleven millions was to bring the state's pastoral and agricultural sectors to collapse and many rural towns entered a slow decline into the worldwide depression of the 1930s.

On the cusp of the boom/bust, Harry Corones was to commence building his grand vision of hospitality for the west to rival the capital's best hotels. Born on the Greek island of Kythera, Harry "Poppa" Corones arrived in Australia in the early 1900s coming to Charleville by 1909 when he was recorded in the Post Office Directories as a "fruiterer". Reputedly on the encouragement of a brewing company representative, Corones became in 1912 the licensee of the Hotel Charleville, which he operated until 1924.

In 1926 Corones became the registered owner of the Hotel Norman, a single storeyed hotel established c. 1895 located a block south of the Hotel Charleville on the corner of Wills and Galatea Street. In an advertisement in Pugh's Almanac for 1905, proprietor DC McDonald claimed the hotel as:

the leading hotel of the southern western line ... the home of the pastoralist, agriculturalist and tourist with lofty cool bedrooms, hot and cold baths, and good paddocking ...

Such claims would be later repeated and amplified by Corones regarding his own hotel. Construction of Corones Hotel Norman (as it was then called) commenced in 1924. Rising phoenix-like on the site of the old Norman Hotel, the ambitious scheme was built in four stages from the south to the north to enable continuation of trade; the construction dates displayed at either end of the building testifying to the five year enterprise. Significantly, given the number of (timber) buildings in the town destroyed by fire including Corones' former hotel the Charleville (actually destroyed by fire twice), Harry Corones' new hotel was a masonry building. The first two stages were of reinforced concrete, the third including the ballroom and final stages of brick. Costing some £50,000 the hotel was built by day labour with preference given to men of the district. By the end of 1926 the new hotel was two thirds complete; only the bar area of the Norman Hotel remained. The mythology of Corones was also well advanced. According to the Australian Pastoralist, Grazing Farmers' and Selectors Gazette the hotel was the topic of conversation from Roma to Eulo, and out to the far west and north:

... In every way the new Hotel Corones will be an example of hotel architecture and comfort scarce equalled in the Southern Hemisphere, and will undoubtedly be a great centre for all western men.

The final stage of building was completed in 1929. The hotel now stretched almost an entire block of Charleville's main street. According to the Architectural and Building Journal of Queensland it was:

"a magnificent white building ... an outstanding feature in a progressive town ... the best equipped and most up-to-date hotel outside the metropolis ... generally acknowledged as the calling-place of all distinguished tourists and travellers..."

The hotel itself produced a 12-page brochure about this time which included black-and-white photographs of the interior: on the ground floor the lounge had gleaming copper-topped tables, deep leather lounges and chairs and led to a writing room and telephone booth; the dining room, enticing in its cleanliness, was capable of seating 150; the private bar which gave exclusive service amidst convivial surroundings was screened from the public bar by an ingenious arrangement a French polished oak partition with mirrors; the public bar was very modern and luxurious and a cool cement court-yard formed an entrance to the ball-room. Upstairs all accommodation rooms opened onto the verandah – some were equipped with their own bathrooms designed to please the most fastidious, and the upstairs lounge was just the place for a real restful smoke. Corones Hall located on Galatea Street had a floor unexcelled outside Brisbane and was largely in demand for exclusive balls, parties, and banquets. Capable of seating 320 at dinner, the hall was built for coolness with a number of high-set windows and electric ceiling fans. The lights with Venetian shades of various hues were adjustable either to dimness or the reverse, and an orchestra platform added to its popularity and beauty.

Furnishings throughout, including the bedroom furniture, dining room, lounge room, chairs, settees, sideboards, etc., were designed and manufactured by the well-known Queensland home furnisher F Tritton Ltd of George Street Brisbane using beautiful Queensland wood, the Queensland maple. Carpets, linoleums, floor coverings, curtains, etc. (British throughout) were all laid and fitted by Trittons. The furniture designed by the Trittons is still being used by the hotel, with the current owner retrieving subsequent furniture from storage.

The architect of this magnificent modern hotel was William Hodgen jnr (1867–1943). The son of pioneer Toowoomba building contractor William Hodgen, in 1886 he became a cadet in the Colonial Architect's Office and in 1891 enrolled at the Architectural Association School of Architecture in London whilst working with a number of prominent London architects. In December 1896 he returned to Queensland commencing practice the following year in Toowoomba when he immediately received a substantial commission from retailer TC Beirne for works to his newly established Fortitude Valley premises as well as winning a competition for a new wing to the Toowoomba Hospital (the Victoria Wing). In practice until his death in 1943 (from 1935 in partnership with his sons as W Hodgen and Hodgen), Hodgen's practice, like that of contemporary Harry Marks (1871–1939) (who also was a member of one of Queensland's architectural family dynasties) was both extensive and broadranging from domestic (e.g. the Toowoomba residences "Tor" (1904) and Tyson Manor (1905), institutional (e.g. Glennie Memorial School (1914), to industrial (e.g. flour mill and wheat and flour stores for Crisp O'Brien 1911) and a number of hotels in western towns including in Charleville, the Hotel Charleville (1913; rebuilt again after a second fire 1931). Hodgen's second Hotel Charleville was similar but of a smaller scale to the Hotel Corones - both had lost the classical and arts and crafts elements typical of his early hotels, and instead adapted simplified Art Deco decoration on the facade. Both hotels are a dominant presence in Charleville's main street; but it is the Hotel Corones which is regarded as Hodgen's major single work and the highlight of his career.

For over thirty years the Hotel Corones ("The Leading Hotel of the West") flourished as a tourist, pastoral and CTA (Commercial Travellers Association) House. Harry Corones' advertisements and stationery proclaimed vice-regal patronage; and in addition to wealthy local graziers, celebrities such as Amy Johnson, Gracie Fields, and the Duke and Duchess of Gloucester were guests at the hotel. In 1936 there were on average 133 guests per week and during World War II when American servicemen occupied the local aerodrome and hospital, "Poppa" Corones did a roaring trade with dances held "every night" in Corones Hall. In 1959, the state's centenary year, Charleville's civic welcome to its Royal visitor, HRH Princess Alexandra took place in front of the hotel and Corones' advertisement in the town's centenary souvenir book could still proclaim that:

Charleville Means CORONES because Corones is the centre of Charleville's social activities and the rendezvous where business agreements can be made in surroundings which, by their comfort and restfulness, provide the perfect setting for quiet consideration. People who insist on the best in fine living invariably made Corones their home while in Charleville.

Just a few years later, however, a Licensing Commission Report described the Hotel Corones as being overtaken by a new type of hospitality accommodation, the motel in the shape of the newly rebuilt Victoria Hotel-Motel. Drought in the 1960s was also to severely impact on the local (including Corones') economy; the heyday of both the town and the Hotel was over.

In 1972 Harry Corones died; his elder son, Peter and wife Mary who had operated the hotel for some time prior to Harry Corones' death continued its stewardship. In 1982 the hotel was acquired by Doreen and Bob Bishop. It changed hands again in 1989. In 1990 a motel was erected to the rear of the hotel: in April of that year, the disastrous flood which covered much of the town, entered the ground floor of the hotel. As a result, substantial works including the restoration of the main stair were carried out; about this time some bedrooms on the upper floor were also converted into bathrooms and what are believed to be the former Commercial Travellers' sample rooms on Galatea Street were converted into a shop and motel style accommodation. In 1993, the hotel was listed by the National Trust of Queensland. The Hotel Corones is now operated by Gordon and Frances Harding as both a local pub and (in recognition of the hotel's iconic status) a cultural tourist attraction in the state's south west: Corones Hall is regularly used for functions such as weddings and balls, daily tours of the hotel are conducted by Mrs Harding, and the mythology of both the man and his hotel continues.

The hotel was sold in February 2014 to ERI Partners which planned to expand the range of the hotel's dining and entertainment options.

In September 2023, the hotel sold to Australian Motel Group Pty Ltd, owned by sole shareholder Neil Robert Langton and Company Director, Marcus Thomas Shaw.

== Description ==
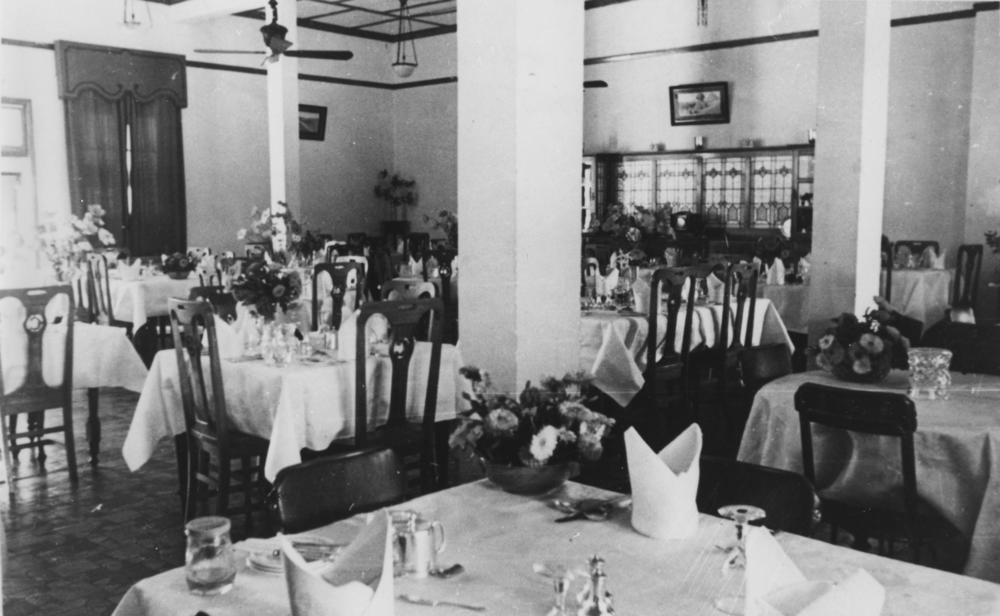
Dining room, circa 1930

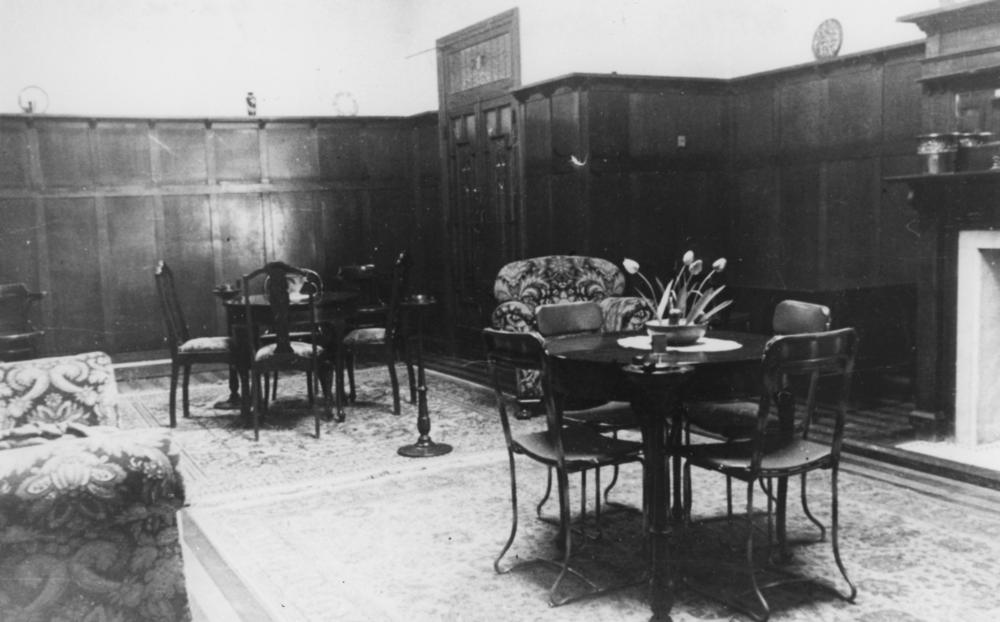
Sitting room, circa 1930

Corones Hotel is a two storey rendered brick and re-inforced concrete building running on a north–south axis along Wills Street (Charleville's main street and part of the Warrego Highway) between Galatea and Edward Streets, Charleville. It has an adjoining single storey ballroom and a hall running to the east along Galatea Street. A bar, foyer, dining room, kitchen, shops, ballroom, hall and toilets and three shops occupy the ground floor; accommodation rooms and a guest lounge are located on the first floor. There are single storey contemporary motel units in the south east corner of the site which are not considered of cultural heritage significance. A double story building, including staff quarters on the upper level and garages below, is located behind the motel units.

The building has a wide two-storey verandah which extends over the footpath running down Wills Street and returning along Galatea Street. The verandah has a straight roof and is constructed of timber supported by timber posts with brackets at their tops. There is a simple timber battened balustrade at the first floor.

A high parapet with projecting piers sits above the verandah along Galatea and Wills Streets and returns along the southern elevation from Wills Street and runs south back from Galatea Street. The parapet is accentuated with shaped gable sections at each end and centrally along Wills Street and at the Galatea Street and south ends. A small cornice runs along the top of the parapet and the name HOTEL CORONES is cast in relief with a surrounding border on the south and north ends and centrally along Wills Street. Construction dates AD 1924 and AD 1929 are on the south and north ends of the building respectively. A heavy cornice with supporting dentils runs above the verandah roof between the shaped gables along Wills and Galatea Streets.

The main roof is a skillion form and is clad in corrugated iron.

A rear verandah is situated on the south eastern corner of the building and the kitchen wing with two prominent attached fireplaces extends at right angles from the rear of the building.

The exterior to the ground floor is punctuated with doors to the main entrance foyer from Wills Street and entrances to the bar from both Wills and Galatea Street. Deep casement windows, some of which have leadlight designs, are regularly positioned along both street frontages. A tiled dado runs along the walls to the bar and to the three shops on the southern end of the building where aluminium windows have been installed. At first floor level accommodation rooms open onto verandahs through French doors.

Adjoining the hotel to the east is a single storey ballroom with a central door and two symmetrically positioned windows with semi circular heads either side. The facade of this part of the building is plain with a simple cornice that forms a parapet to the flat roof over. Adjoining this area is Corones Hall. The Hall is set back from Galatea Street and is entered from a centrally positioned set of heavy wooden doors. The facade is rendered to the height of the adjoining ballroom roof and has piers supporting a dentilled cornice which rises over the entrance in a semicircular pediment. Above this is a brick gabled stepped parapet with projecting piers and plaster coping. The brick work has decorative diamond patterning at the apex of the gable and at each side above the cornice. The name CORONES' HALL is inscribed in plaster relief on a plaster tablet on the gable above the entrance door.

The interior of the hotel retains its original detailing. The foyer has silky oak panelling, decorated plaster ceilings, and leadlight windows. The main stair is silky oak. Many original furnishings remain.

== Heritage listing ==
The Hotel Corones in Charleville was listed on the Queensland Heritage Register on 1 July 1997 having satisfied the following criteria.

The place is important in demonstrating the evolution or pattern of Queensland's history.

Riding on the statewide economic boom of the 1920s, Harry "Poppa" Corones built his hotel which was to become a byword for hospitality in the west. Spanning nearly a block of Charleville's main street, the Hotel Corones was also to become in the succeeding decades, a symbol of both the prosperity and the changing fortunes of the town and the pastoral industry of south west Queensland, which it served.

The place demonstrates rare, uncommon or endangered aspects of Queensland's cultural heritage.

The man and his hotel became synonymous: the use of the Corones name as the hotel name represented a significant break in the English tradition of the naming of hotels within an accepted nomenclature, a marketing strategy which was to see both the man and his hotel achieve (a joint and severable) iconic status in the west. That this icon was also of Greek origin was even more singular: Greek migration to Queensland in this century was most visible in the small business sector; the Greek cafe and green grocer became standard fixtures in the state's cities and throughout rural Queensland. Harry Corones' move into the hotel industry and the scale in which it was undertaken (uncompromisingly proclaimed by his ambitious plans for the Hotel Corones) represented a significant leap. Moreover, in the (predominantly British) mythology of the (Queensland) west, the Greek hero was (and is) a rarity.

The place is important in demonstrating the principal characteristics of a particular class of cultural places.

The Hotel Corones is the major work of architect William Hodgen whose Toowoomba practice extended throughout the west including a number of country hotels including others in Charleville (Hotel Charleville 1912; and the Hotel Corone's close relative the Hotel Charleville as rebuilt (again) 1931). A dominant landmark in the Charleville townscape, the quality and intactness of the hotel in particular the interiors (including not only the accommodation areas of the hotel, foyer, and dining room, but also uncommonly, a substantially intact bar area) as well as furnishings and fittings make the Hotel Corones an exceptional example of an intact interwar hotel (albeit one conceived on a grand scale).

The place is important because of its aesthetic significance.

In common with so many Queensland country towns, a number of timber buildings in Charleville (including the hotel previously leased by Harry Corones, the Hotel Charleville) had been destroyed by fire. The Hotel Corones was one of several substantial masonry buildings erected in Charleville during the 1920s and 1930s: particularly given that so few of the earlier major buildings of the town remain these buildings are an important part of the built fabric of the town as well as a demonstrable attempt to break with a rather bleak tradition associated with the use of timber as a building material in the hot dry climate of the west.

The place has a strong or special association with a particular community or cultural group for social, cultural or spiritual reasons.

Riding on the statewide economic boom of the 1920s, Harry "Poppa" Corones built his hotel which was to become a byword for hospitality in the west. Spanning nearly a block of Charleville's main street, the Hotel Corones was also to become in the succeeding decades, a symbol of both the prosperity and the changing fortunes of the town and the pastoral industry of south west Queensland, which it served.

The place has a special association with the life or work of a particular person, group or organisation of importance in Queensland's history.

The man and his hotel became synonymous: the use of the Corones name as the hotel name represented a significant break in the English tradition of the naming of hotels within an accepted nomenclature, a marketing strategy which was to see both the man and his hotel achieve (a joint and severable) iconic status in the west. That this icon was also of Greek origin was even more singular: Greek migration to Queensland in this century was most visible in the small business sector; the Greek cafe and green grocer became standard fixtures in the state's cities and throughout rural Queensland. Harry Corones' move into the hotel industry and the scale in which it was undertaken (uncompromisingly proclaimed by his ambitious plans for the Hotel Corones) represented a significant leap. Moreover, in the (predominantly British) mythology of the (Queensland) west, the Greek hero was (and is) a rarity.
