= Boer War Memorial, Gatton =

War memorial in Queensland, Australia

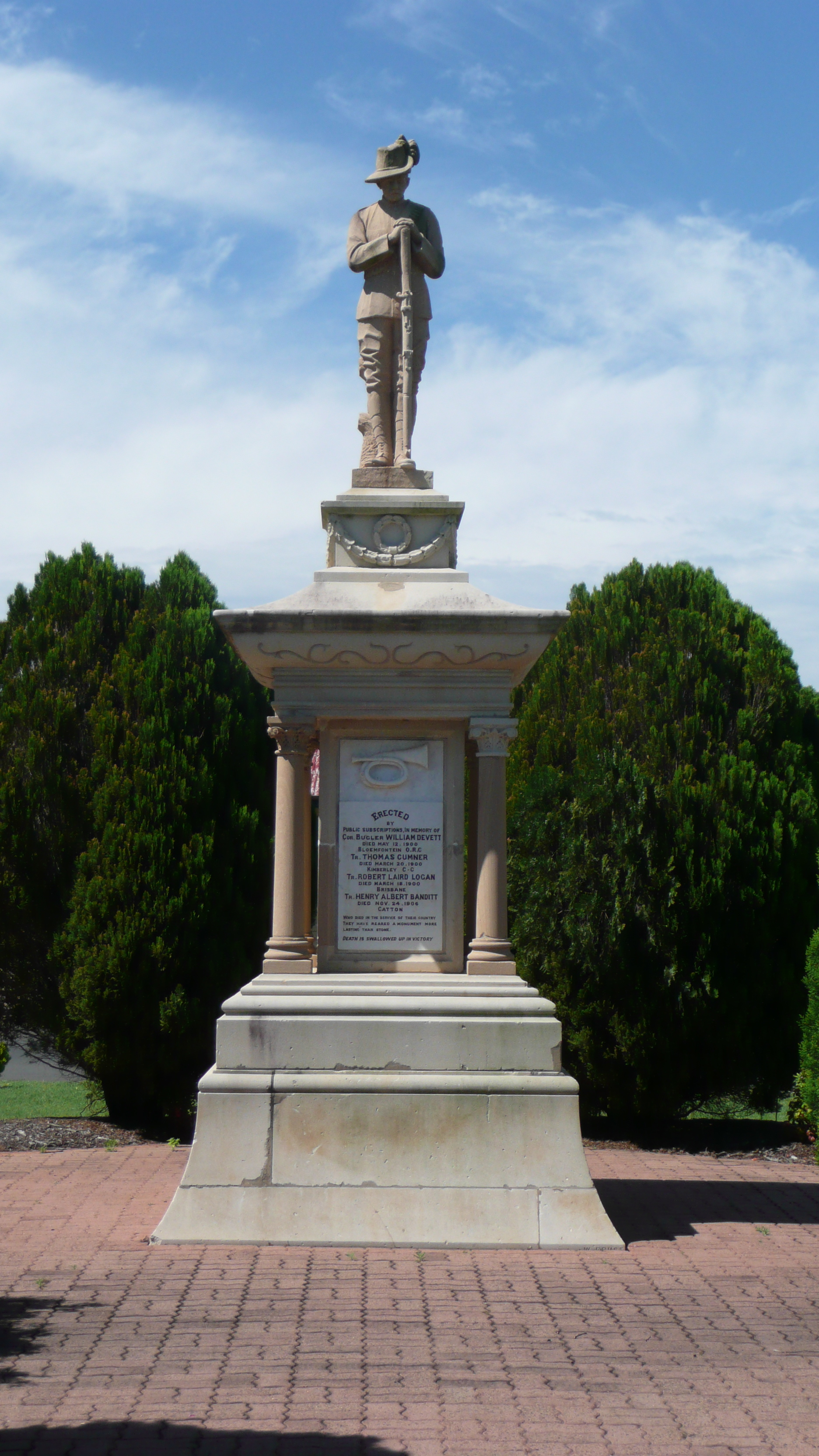
- Gatton Boer War Memorial

- Location within Queensland Location within Australia
- 27.5547°S 152.2773°E
- Location: Crescent Street, Gatton, Queensland, Australia

History
- Design period: 1900–1914 (early 20th century)
- Built: 1908–1908

Site notes
- Architect: William Hodgen

Queensland Heritage Register
- Official name: Boer War Memorial, Fallen Soldiers Memorial, South African War Memorial
- Type: state heritage (built)
- Designated: 21 October 1992
- Reference no.: 600510
- Significant period: 1908– (social); 1908–1970s (historical, fabric)
- Significant components: memorial – soldier statue
- Builders: Walter Bruce

Boer War Memorial is a heritage-listed war memorial at Crescent Street, Gatton, Queensland, Australia. It was designed by William Hodgen and produced by Toowoomba mason William Bruce. It was built in 1908, and was unveiled on 3 August by Governor of Queensland, Lord Chelmsford. The memorial honours four local men who died in or as a result of the Boer War, and is one of only three known Boer War memorials in Queensland. It is also known as the Fallen Soldiers Memorial and the South African War Memorial.

The memorial consists of a life-size statue of a digger, atop a pedestal with marble plaques stating the names and ranks of the men who died. The memorial was originally located in the intersection of Railway and Crescent Streets and was moved to its current location in the late 1970s. In 1984 the monument was sandblasted to remove layers of paint. The original statue had been made of Italian marble; it was replaced at some stage by the current sandstone statue, and when or for what reason is unknown. The memorial was added to the Queensland Heritage Register on 21 October 1992.

== History ==
In April 1907, a public meeting was held at which it was decided to erect a memorial. A design competition was announced and was won by Toowoomba architect, William Hodgen.

William Hodgen was born in Toowoomba in 1866. He was employed by the Queensland Colonial Architect's Office in Brisbane from 1886 to 1891 when he left for London. On his return to Queensland in 1896 he established a private practice in Toowoomba and designed buildings throughout Queensland. The Gatton Boer War Memorial is an unusual example of his work.

The pedestal was produced by Toowoomba monumental mason, Walter Bruce and the statue was imported from Italy. The total cost of the monument was £200.

The Gatton memorial was constructed at an early phase of the history of war memorials in the state. After World War I, the construction of war memorials was prolific. In 1908, when this memorial was unveiled, they were still quite rare.

Australian war memorials are valuable evidence of imperial and national loyalties, at the time not seen as conflicting; the skills of local stonemasons, metalworkers and architects; and of popular taste. In Queensland, the soldier statue, which was first used to commemorate those died in the Boer War, became the popular choice of memorial for the First World War. This was in contrast to the southern states where the obelisk predominated.

The digger statue later embodied the ANZAC Spirit, representing the qualities of the ideal Australian - loyalty, courage, youth, innocence and masculinity. The digger was a phenomenon peculiar to Queensland, perhaps due to the fact that other states had followed Britain's lead and established Advisory Boards made up of architects and artists, prior to the erection of war memorials. The digger statue was not highly regarded by artists and architects who were involved in the design of relatively few Queensland memorials

Most statues were constructed by local masonry firms, although some were by artists or imported.

There are only three known Boer War memorials in Queensland in the form of the digger. Of these only two were erected shortly after the war. These are the Allora Memorial, erected in 1904 and the Gatton Memorial, erected in 1908. The third Boer memorial, in Brisbane, was not unveiled until 1919.

This memorial was originally located in the intersection of Railway and Crescent Streets and was moved in the late 1970s. It originally stood on a stepped base, which was lost in the relocation. In 1984 the monument was sandblasted to remove layers of paint. The original Italian marble digger statue, which was said to be very realistic, was replaced by the current sandstone statue. When this occurred, or for what reason is unknown.

== Description ==
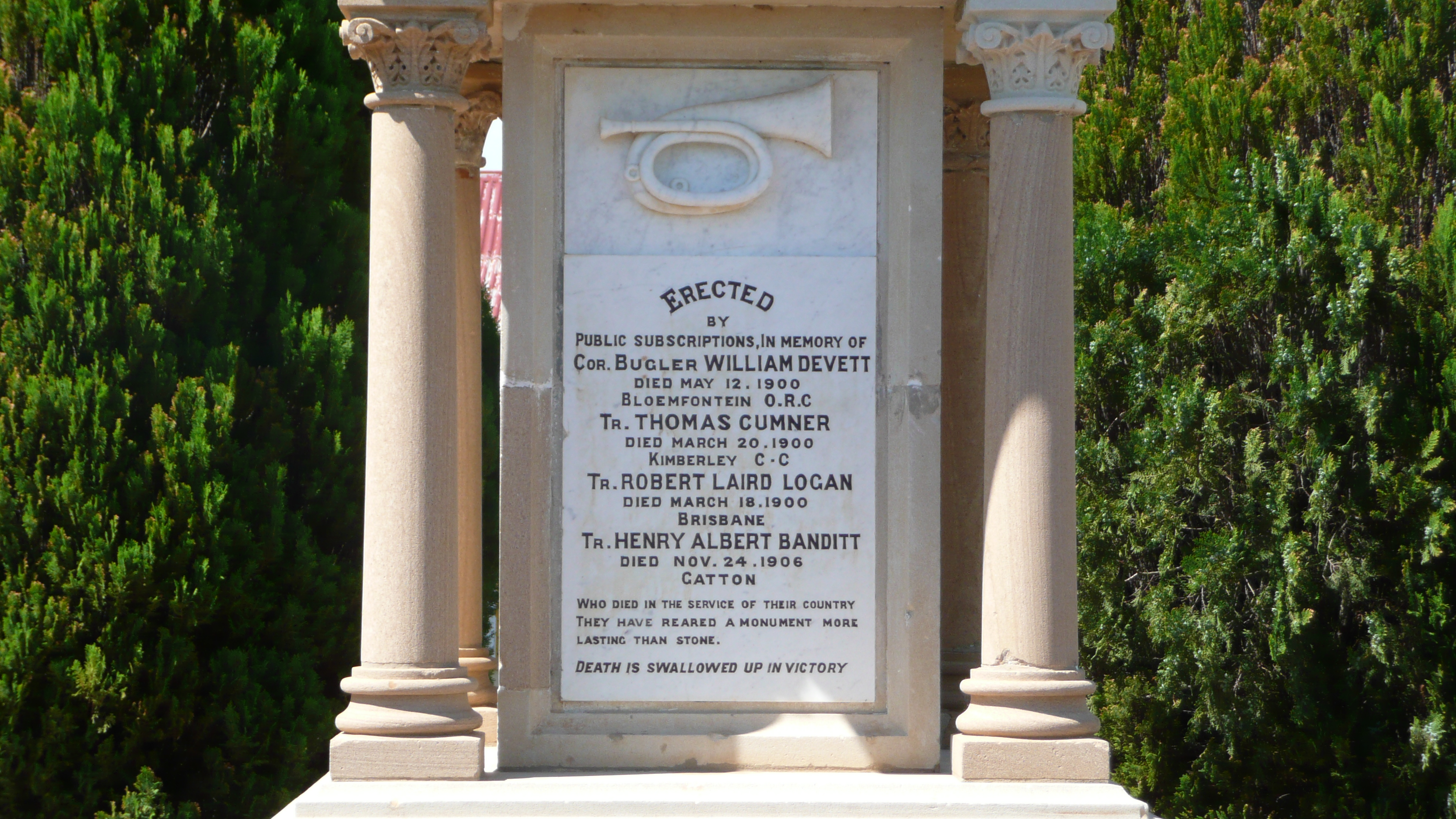
Marble plaque with carved bugle

The Boer Memorial is situated in a small park in Gatton in front of the railway station. The monument is centrally located in a paved area in the centre of the park and is flanked by two large fig trees.

The paved area consists of a short path at the front which divides into curved paths around the memorial and rejoins at the rear to continue in a short, straight path. Comparatively new planting is contained in beds on either side of the paving.

The Helidon sandstone Boer Memorial comprises a pedestal surmounted by a digger statue.

It sits on a slightly concave base constructed of sandstone blocks. This is surmounted by a curved moulding and a smooth-faced step which is capped by a series of curved mouldings with shadow reveals between.

The pedestal comprises a recessed square section with freestanding columns at each corner. Leaded marble plaques are located on the front and rear faces stating the names and ranks of the four local men who died as a result of the Boer War. One of the men was a bugler, and the front face has a relief carved bugle above the plaque. The insignia of the Australian Light Horse is located above the plaque on the rear face.

The columns have Corinthian order capitals and bases and support a large frieze and cornice. The cornice has a large central convex surface on which is a simple, deeply carved curvilinear pattern.

Surmounting the pedestal is the digger statue which is life-sized. The soldier stands on a square plinth decorated on all faces with relief carved wreaths and festoons. His head is bowed and hands are resting on his reversed rifle. A supporting tree stump is located at the rear of the statue.

== Heritage listing ==
Boer War Memorial was listed on the Queensland Heritage Register on 21 October 1992 having satisfied the following criteria.

The place is important in demonstrating the evolution or pattern of Queensland's history.

War Memorials are important in demonstrating the pattern of Queensland's history as they are representative of a recurrent theme that involved most communities throughout the state. They provide evidence of an era of widespread Australian patriotism and nationalism, particularly during and following the First World War.

It was constructed at an early phase of the history of war memorials in the state, which became prolific after the First World War but in 1908 when this memorial was constructed were quite rare.

The Boer War Memorial at Gatton is an immensely important Queensland monument.

The place demonstrates rare, uncommon or endangered aspects of Queensland's cultural heritage.

It is one of only two known digger statues built to commemorate the involvement and death of Queensland soldiers in the Boer War of 1899–1902. A third Boer War Memorial was unveiled in Brisbane at a much later date.

The place is important in demonstrating the principal characteristics of a particular class of cultural places.

The monuments manifest a unique documentary record and are demonstrative of popular taste.

The Gatton Boer War Memorial demonstrates the principal characteristics of a commemorative structure erected as an enduring record of a major historical event. This is achieved through the use of appropriate materials and design elements.

The place is important because of its aesthetic significance.

It is of aesthetic significance, both as a landmark within the streetscape and for its high level of workmanship and design.

The place has a strong or special association with a particular community or cultural group for social, cultural or spiritual reasons.

It has a strong association with the community as evidence of the impact of a major historic event and with Toowoomba architect, William Hodgen as an unusual example of his work.

The place has a special association with the life or work of a particular person, group or organisation of importance in Queensland's history.

It has a strong association with the community as evidence of the impact of a major historic event and with Toowoomba architect, William Hodgen as an unusual example of his work.
