= William Hodgen =

William Hodgen (1866–1943) was an architect in Queensland, Australia. Many of his works are now heritage-listed. He is also known as William Hodgen, junior.

== Early life ==
William Hodgen was born in Toowoomba on 9 September 1866, the son of pioneer building contractor William Hodgen and his wife Eliza (née Nelson).

== Architectural career ==
From 1886 to 1891, Hodgen was a cadet in the Queensland Colonial Architect's Office in Brisbane from 1886 to 1891. In 1891, he left for London, where he studied at the Royal Institute of British Architects, whilst working with a number of prominent London architects. He passed his examinations with honours in 1893 and was elected an Associate of the Institute.

Hodgen returned to Queensland in December 1896. Hodgen established a private practice in Toowoomba with an advertisement in the Darling Downs Gazette of 6 February 1897 announcing he was a new Toowoomba architect. He immediately received a substantial commission from retailer T.C. Beirne for works to his newly established Fortitude Valley premises as well as winning a competition for the new Victoria Wing of the Toowoomba Hospital.

Growth and development in both Toowoomba and the Downs and his own efficient work meant he soon had a busy and successful practice. While trained in Queensland, his London experiences and knowledge of the Arts and Crafts movement and Edwardian Classicism were expressed in some of his buildings. However, he tended to employ a Free style, modifying the prevailing Queensland vernacular by introducing individualist elements. His English experiences are reflected in the classicist detailing of entrance pediments using timber, joinery and internal fittings. Hodgen was in practice for 43 years and he designed a large number of buildings varying from small cottages to sporting facilities, halls and large complex hotels in Toowoomba and on the Darling Downs.

In April 1907, a public meeting was held in Gatton at which it was decided to erect a memorial. A design competition was announced and it was won by William Hodgen.

From 1935 he worked in partnership with his sons as W Hodgen and Hodgen, but practised until his death. His portfolio of work was both extensive and broadranging, encompassing homes, institutions, commercial and industrial buildings.

== Later life ==
Hodgen died on 29 June 1943. He left an estate valued at £31,092. He founded a dynasty of architects in Toowoomba; in addition to sons, his grandson Brian Hodgen and his great-grandson practised as architects in Toowoomba.

== Notable works ==
His notable works include:

- 1897: Kensington (residence), Toowoomba
- 1899: Victory Wing at Toowoomba Hospital
- 1901: Extensions to Wesleyan Methodist Church, Toowoomba
- 1903: Rectory at St Matthew's Anglican Church, Drayton
- 1904: Conversion of Old Toowoomba Court House into Austral Hall, Toowoomba
- 1904: Tor (residence), Toowoomba
- 1905: Tyson Manor, Toowoomba
- 1907: Elphin (residence), Toowoomba
- 1907: Boer War Memorial, Gatton
- 1908: Wislet (house and hospital), Toowoomba
- 1911: Conversion of residence Dalmally into Bishop's House, Toowoomba
- 1912: Freshney House (nurses' quarters), Toowoomba Hospital
- 1913: Hotel Charleville, Charleville
- 1914: Glennie Memorial School, Toowoomba
- 1923: Soldiers Memorial Hall, Toowoomba
- 1924: Hotel Corones, Charleville
- 1931: Swimming pool at Glen Alpine, Toowoomba (one of first domestic swimming pools in Toowoomba)
- 1934: Toowoomba Permanent Building Society
