= Soldiers Memorial Hall, Toowoomba =

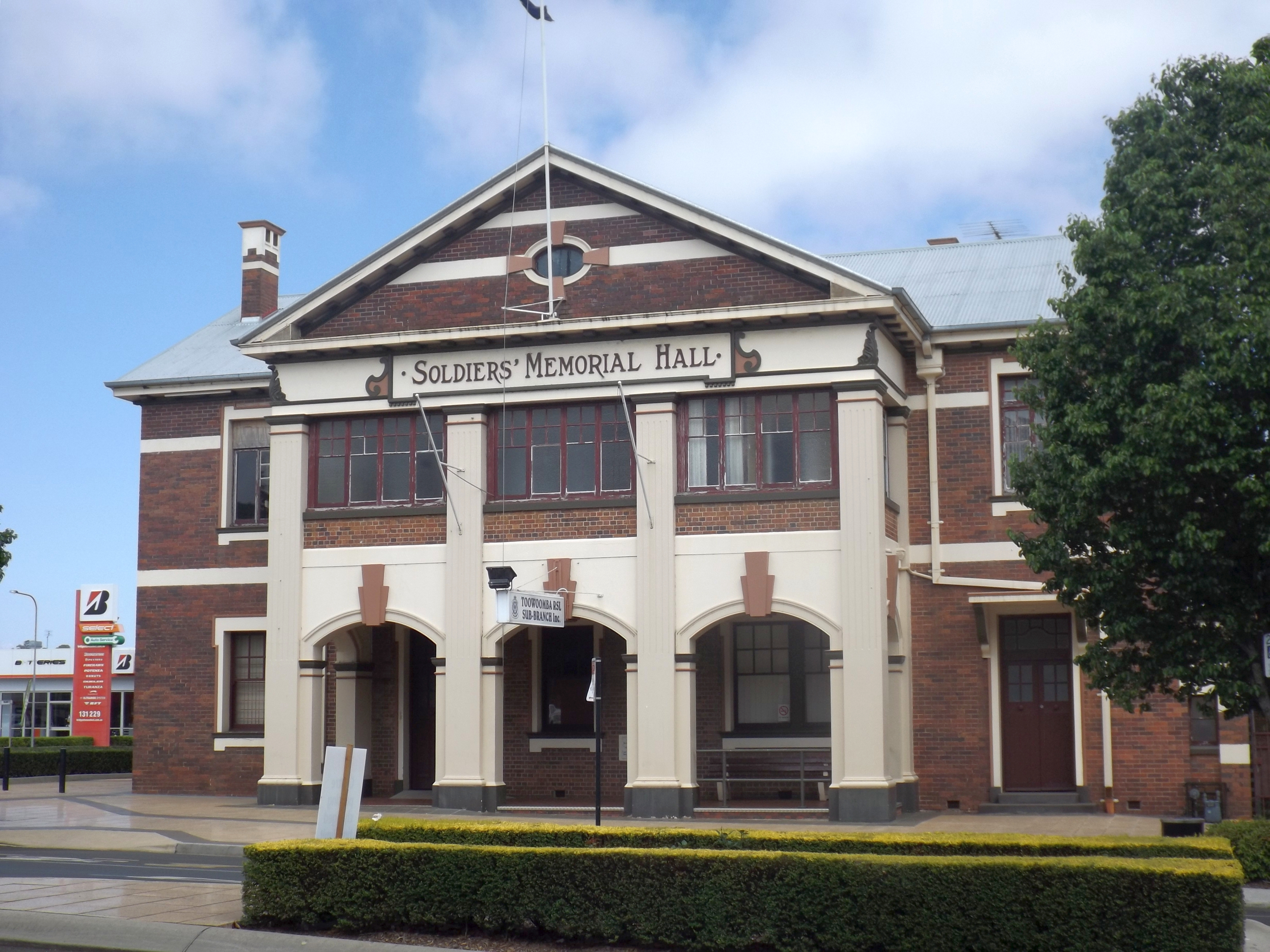
- View from Ruthven Street, 2014

- Location within Queensland Location within Australia
- 27.5646°S 151.9523°E
- Location: 149 Herries Street, Toowoomba City, Queensland, Australia

History
- Design period: 1919–1930s (interwar period)
- Built: 1923–1959

Site notes
- Architect: Hodgen & Hodgen (Toowoomba)
- Architectural style: Classicism

Queensland Heritage Register
- Official name: Soldiers Memorial Hall
- Type: state heritage (built)
- Designated: 17 December 1999
- Reference no.: 601297
- Significant period: 1923–24, 1930–31, 1957–59 (fabric, historical); 1923– (social)
- Significant components: memorial – war, memorial – hall
- Builders: Smith Bros (Toowoomba)

Soldiers Memorial Hall is a heritage-listed memorial at 149 Herries Street, Toowoomba City, Queensland, Australia. It was designed by Hodgen & Hodgen (Toowoomba) and built from 1923 to 1959 by Smith Bros (Toowoomba). It was added to the Queensland Heritage Register on 17 December 1999.

== History ==
The Soldiers' Memorial Hall, Toowoomba was erected in three stages: 1923–1924, 1930–1931, and 1957–1959, as a tribute to all those from Toowoomba and district who had served in the First World War, many of whom did not return, and for the use of returned servicemen and the citizens of Toowoomba. Local architect and Alderman William Hodgen junior and his firm designed all three stages of the hall.

The First World War (1914–1918), although fought in Europe, North Africa and the Middle East, had a profound impact on Australia. At the outbreak of war Australia, as a former (and recent) British colony with strong ties still to the "motherland", immediately entered the war in support of Britain and her allies. Over 300,000 Australians out of a population of 4 million volunteered for service overseas, with approximately 60,000 of these making the supreme sacrifice. Virtually every community in every Australian state lost young men in this war.

The idea of erecting a memorial hall in Toowoomba was first mooted at a meeting of citizens and returned soldiers held at the Toowoomba Town Hall in 1918. A committee to coordinate fund raising and the construction of the hall was appointed in 1919. The Citizens' Memorial Hall Committee purchased land for the hall in 1919 in Ruthven Street for £500, on the understanding that the Town Council acquired adjoining land at the corner of Herries Street. It was anticipated that the committee would facilitate construction and furnishing of the hall, which would then be handed to the Town Council, for lease to the Toowoomba Branch of the Returned Sailors and Soldiers Imperial League of Australia (R.S.S.I.L.A.) – more commonly known as the RSL.

By November 1921 the Citizen's Committee was planning to invite competitive designs for club rooms and assembly hall, the price not to exceed £5000. Highly respected Sydney architect John Sulman was appointed as sole adjudicator of the competition in February 1922, but it is unclear whether the competition eventuated. By mid-1922, plans for a two-storeyed brick clubrooms with large assembly hall at the rear had been prepared by Toowoomba architect and Alderman William Hodgen junior. Tenders were called and in January 1923 a contract was let to Smith Brothers of Toowoomba for the front section only, the clubrooms fronting Ruthven Street. The Citizen's Committee planned to erect the second section of Hodgen's design, the assembly hall at the rear, as soon as sufficient funds had been raised. The assembly hall was to be used for large social functions, lectures, and public meetings, and was intended as much for the citizens of Toowoomba and district as for returned servicemen.

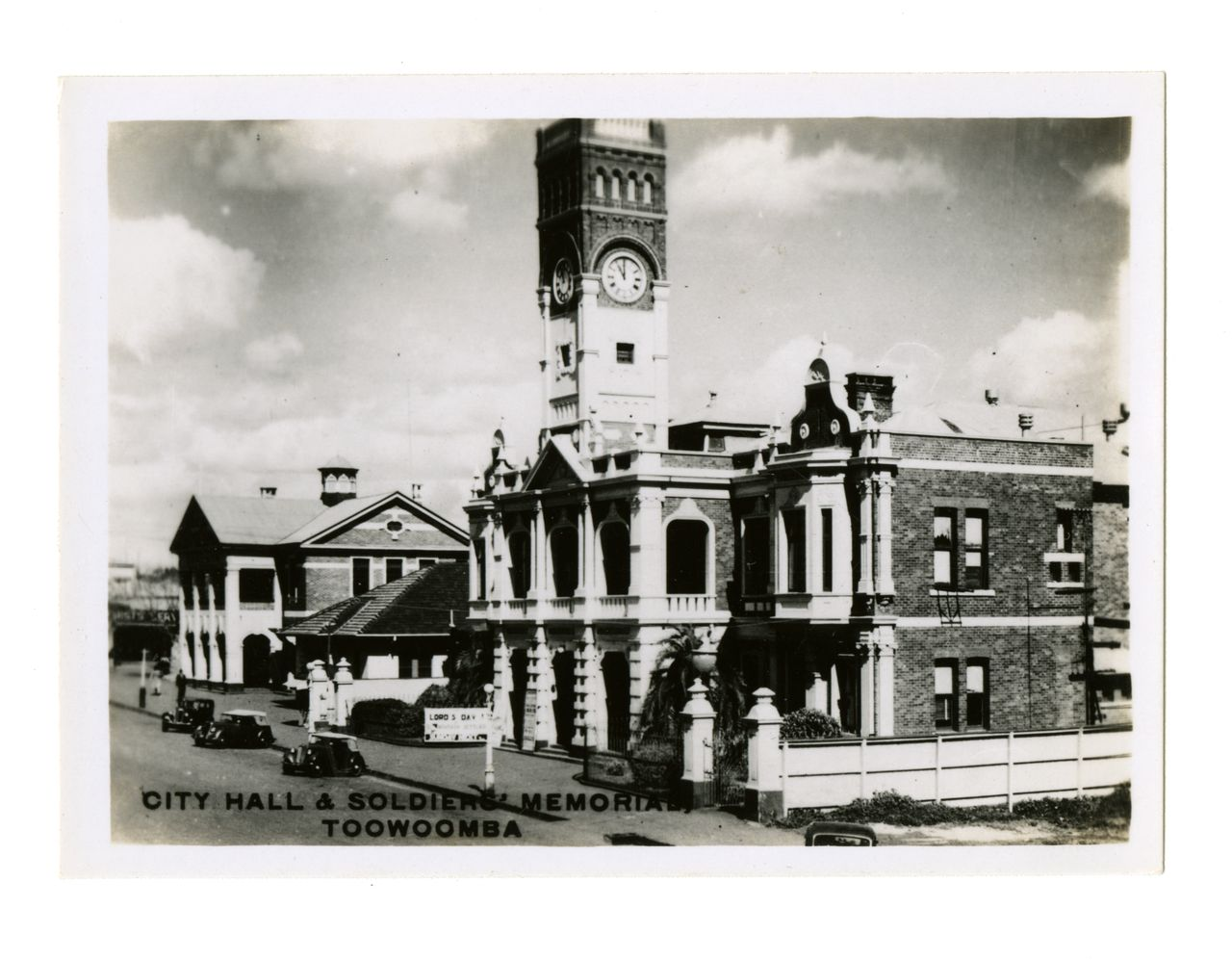
City Hall and Soldier Memorial, Toowoomba, c1920

The foundation stone was laid on Anzac Day, 25 April 1923, by Major-General Sir Thomas William Glasgow, who reflected the patriotic fervour that still gripped Australia when he said of the intended memorial hall: "May it forever remind us of the duty we all owe to our country and to the Empire to which we are all proud to belong". By this date the Citizens' Committee had raised in cash and promises, between £5000 and £6000, and another £1500 was required to finish and furnish the first section of the building.

The Soldiers' Memorial Hall was officially opened by the Queensland Governor, Sir Matthew Nathan, on 5 September 1924 in the presence of a large gathering. Earlier on the same day, the Citizen's Committee had vested the property in the Town Council, and the RSL was granted a 99-year lease at a "peppercorn" rent of a shilling a year, if demanded. A provision in the lease allowed that should the hall not be required by the soldiers in the future, the use and control of the hall was to revert to the Council for the general use of all the citizens.

At the time of the opening, the building comprised two storeys, with a single gable to each side of the roof and an open, gabled colonnade across the Ruthven Street elevation. A narrow, single-storeyed brick section at the rear appears to have been erected at this time also, (possibly containing additional storerooms and public lavatories); as was a pair of brick pillars, wrought-iron gate and small brick fence along Ruthven Street, between the club building and the adjacent Commonwealth Research Laboratory, also erected in 1923.

The top floor of the Soldiers' Memorial Hall, used exclusively by returned soldiers as a club, contained a club room, billiards room, card room and lavatories. The ground floor comprised an entrance vestibule, office, restaurant, kitchen and cloakrooms. The RSL utilised the downstairs office, but also let parts of the ground floor to the Country Women's Association and the Theosophical Society for their meetings. The hall was fitted with all modern conveniences, including a septic tank system, electric light, and telephone. Furniture was of maple, and situated in a prominent position in the club room was a writing desk presented to the club by the Mothers' Memorial Committee.

Use of the club rooms was open to all returned soldiers, with membership fees set at 5/- for League members and 7/6 for non-members. Visiting ex-soldiers were admitted as honorary members.

The Soldiers' Memorial Hall was built to serve a number of purposes: as a war memorial; to provide administrative facilities to assist returned soldiers with employment and welfare services; to provide an institute with library, reading room and recreation facilities for returned servicemen; and as a locale where the comradeship of the returned servicemen could find expression, and where all who were suffering from the war could find relief. The building was considered a handsome attraction to the Toowoomba townscape, and the planned hall was seen as being of benefit to the whole of the community.

In 1927–28 the Toowoomba Town Council acquired a fourth parcel of land at the rear of the site, with a 54-foot (16 m) frontage to Herries Street, which was leased to the RSL for memorial hall purposes, enabling them to proceed with construction of the assembly hall. Hodgen's initial design, which was for an enormous hall of two storeys in height with a verandah on the north side and a gallery at the eastern end, proved too expensive an undertaking. Plans were prepared (apparently by Hodgen) for a smaller, single-storeyed, pavilion-style hall, which was erected in 1930–31. It was built to the same width as the front section of the building, and internally contained a dais along the western end and another along the northern side of the dance floor. On the northern side of the dance hall was an external entrance, accessed from Ruthven Street via the side gate erected in 1923. A brick portico was added above this entrance gate, and the c. 1923 single-storeyed section of the building was remodelled to provide internal access from the front section of the building through to the dance floor behind. At this period also the single-storeyed rear section was raised to two storeys, with a separate gabled roof. The new upper storey of this section contained a lounge, bar and card room.

In the early 1950s, renewed interest in the RSL as an institution – following Australian involvement in the Second World War (1939–45), Korean War (1950–53) and Malayan communist insurgency of 1954 – encouraged the idea of extending Toowoomba's Soldiers' Memorial Hall to provide improved club facilities for members, and a larger dance hall for the citizens of Toowoomba and district. The firm of Hodgen & Hodgen was once again asked to prepare plans, c. 1954. The proposed scheme was for the 1930–31 hall to be replaced with a larger, two-storeyed building with partial basement and roof garden – the basement to contain kitchen and supper room; the ground floor to contain the dance floor; and the upper floor to contain a cafeteria and bar. Tender prices proved prohibitive, so the extensions were modified to contain only a single-storeyed dance hall with basement kitchen and supper room, omitting any new facilities for RSL members. In negotiations with the Toowoomba City Council on this matter in March 1956, Dr Furness, President of the Toowoomba Sub-branch of the RSL, explained that the modified plan was intended for the citizens of Toowoomba, to provide a centrally located dance floor which could be used for a variety of public functions. The RSL believed that they should build for the whole community, not just for returned servicemen.

After some difficulties experienced in the raising of a loan and the letting of the contract, Toowoomba architect Malcolm Just was appointed supervising architect of the revised extension, based on the Hodgen and Hodgen scheme, in April 1957. The new dance hall and basement supper room was opened in the second half of 1959. At the time it was the largest dance hall in Toowoomba, with an excellent suspended timber floor, attracting most of the principal dance events in Toowoomba, including the annual Piggots, Toowoomba Foundry, Defiance Flour Mill, Masonic, Post Office and RSL balls.

Unfortunately for the aspirations of the RSL, the advent of television in the late 1950s changed social habits significantly, and from the early 1960s public dances and balls declined. In 1964, the RSL applied to the Toowoomba City Council to convert the dance hall into club rooms, and to raise revenue by sub-leasing the existing clubrooms in the 1923–24 building to other community groups. Despite community disappointment, conversion was proceeded with in the mid-1960s. The dance floor was converted into three principal areas: a bar and dining room along the northern wall, a games room at the western end, and a billiards room and library at the eastern end. An additional office appears also to have been created at this time, and it is understood that the false ceilings were installed at this time.

At present the dance hall remains partitioned, but the billiard room and library are now one large space, still utilised for dances, dancing classes, and weekly Bingo, and the small dining area on the north side of the building now houses gaming machines. In 1993 the band shell at the western end of the dance floor was converted into a kitchen, and the games room into a dining room.

The building is still utilised by a large number of community organisations: besides several branches of the RSL, the local Veteran's Advisory Service, the Light Horse Association, the British Commonwealth Occupation Forces, and the War Widows utilising the main sections of the building, five Rotary clubs and Toowoomba Lions Club occupy the basement.

== Description ==
The Soldiers' Memorial Hall is prominently located in Toowoomba's central business district, on the corner of Ruthven and Herries streets and adjacent to the Toowoomba City Council Chambers.

The Soldiers' Memorial Hall comprises two sections: a substantial, two-storeyed, face and rendered brick building whose principal facade addresses Ruthven Street (1923–24 building with 1930–31 extensions); and a large, single-storeyed brick section with partial basement, addressing Herries Street (1957–59 extension). The commemorative and formal functions of the RSL are housed in the front section; a dance hall, function and club facilities are housed in the rear.

The design of the front section of the Soldiers' Memorial Hall employs classical elements to reinforce its commemorative and traditional function. The symmetrically composed principal facade is dominated by a large central projecting gabled bay which is arcaded on street level and forms the principal entrance to the building. The ground floor arcade comprises three segmented archways to Ruthven Street and an archway on the returns. The archways, which are moulded with traditional keystone and corbel detail, are separated by square planned, partially reeded, columns which extend to the second floor of the building supporting an entablature beneath the pediment of the triangular gabled end section. The gable end is facebrick and decorated with rendered banding and a central ovolo opening with rendered surround from which four evenly spaced corbels emanate. Above the spandrel of the ground floor arches are face brick panels fitted between the columns. Above the face brick panels early openings have been enclosed with arctic glass window panels in timber frames. The entablature features lettering "SOLDIERS' MEMORIAL HALL" in relief and painted. The gable end projects from the face of this section and regularly spaced dentils line the eaves, this detail continues throughout the earliest part of the Soldiers' Hall. Flanking the projecting bay, on the facebrick face of the Hall is rendered banding at first floor and cornice level and sash windows on both the ground and first floor. The banding and window openings continue around the Herries Street facade of the building and define the earliest part of the Hall. The window openings are surrounded with rendered surrounds, with moulded sills and heads.

The building is of loadbearing construction. The hipped and gabled roof of the Memorial Hall is clad with corrugated iron and is penetrated by several slender face brick chimneys with rendered caps and decorative banding.

The Herries Street facade of the first section continues the detailing of the Ruthven Street facade, with two gables, a repeat of the Ruthven Street gable toward the corner of the building, and a smaller version over a doorway at the Herries Street end of the front section. To the west of this is a face brick extension with parapet walls concealing a hipped roof and dominated by large steel-framed 4x4 window panels providing natural lighting to the dance floor and the club beyond.

The principal entrance to the Soldiers' Memorial Hall is through the arcade of the projecting bay on Ruthven Street which aligns with the projecting entrance bay of the City Hall. On the face of the Soldiers' Memorial Hall, under the arched entrance are three openings, a double half glazed door at the southern end and two window openings. On the wall to the right of the entrance door is a plaque with the inscription:

This stone was laid by MAJOR-GENERAL SIR T.W. GLASGOW, K.C.B., C.M.G., D.S.O., V.D., K.C.B., Anzac Day, April 25, 1923. In Memory of the Fallen, And in appreciation of the living who took part in the great War, 1914–1918.

The entrance door provides access to a Memorial vestibule which is lined on the northern and southern walls with large timber Honour Rolls; that on the southern wall lists participation in the Second World War and that on the northern wall lists participation in the First World War. The Honour Rolls comprise a number of timber panels within frames on which is written in gold lettering the name of each soldier. The panels are framed with a moulded timber surround and surmounted by a broken pediment detail. The floor of the Memorial room is covered with fine grey terrazzo divided into panels with brass strips and featuring centrally located brass lettering "RSL". A large four panelled doorway provides access into the foyer beyond this room. The doors have high mid rails and are glazed above with a combination of arctic and clear glass. Surmounting the doors are transom lights, again with a combination of arctic and clear glass arranged in square and rectangular panels and with a central circular motif, recalling the circular motif of the Ruthven Street gable end. This timber glazed detail is repeated throughout the early part of the building. The walls of the Memorial room are lined with a flocked wallpaper with a design of Gothic inspiration.

The foyer and offices accessed from the foyer, beyond the Memorial room, have more simple detailing with timber skirting and picture rail. The ceilings throughout the ground floor have been covered with suspended ceiling systems.

The stair to the upper level is at the south end of the first section of the building, and comprises a large hall and a substantial timber staircase. The staircase has a heavy unpainted timber battened balustrade with simple art deco inspired newel posts. The underside of the stair is enclosed with fibrous cement sheeting.

The stair arrives at the first floor in a foyer which provides access to the major rooms of the upper floor. Along the Ruthven Street side of this floor is a large meeting room at the southern end and a former billiards room (now another large meeting room) at the northern end. Both rooms have French doors opening onto an enclosed verandah space, and each contains a fireplace. Generally the first floor rooms have plastered rendered walls, simple skirting boards and picture rails and ceilings sheeted with fibrous cement sheeting arranged into rectilinear patterns with simple timber moulded strips.

A change in level at the rear of the front section of the building marks the 1957–59 extension, which comprises a large timber boarded dance floor and club facilities on this level, and below this a partial basement with kitchen and supper/function rooms, accessed from Herries Street at the western end of the building. A feature of the bar area along the north wall of the upper floor of the extension is the use of several small leadlight windows depicting images or sentiments associated with returned soldiers and the war.

== Heritage listing ==
Soldiers Memorial Hall was listed on the Queensland Heritage Register on 17 December 1999 having satisfied the following criteria.

The place is important in demonstrating the evolution or pattern of Queensland's history.

The Soldiers' Memorial Hall, Toowoomba, erected in several stages between 1923 and 1959, is important is demonstrating the pattern and evolution of Queensland's history, as a memorial to the participation, and loss of, members of the Toowoomba community in the First World War and later wars.

The place demonstrates rare, uncommon or endangered aspects of Queensland's cultural heritage.

The Soldiers' Memorial Hall is a rare example of an elaborate soldiers' hall in Queensland. While a number of halls were built for this purpose in the period after the First World War, very few were as substantial as this.

The place is important in demonstrating the principal characteristics of a particular class of cultural places.

The Soldiers' Memorial Hall demonstrates the principal characteristics of a building designed for the use, both recreational and administrative, of returned soldiers and their families, with its memorial vestibule, honour rolls, offices, meeting rooms, recreation rooms, dining rooms, and dance hall. The former large dance hall, although now partitioned into several public spaces, remains important in demonstrating the principal characteristics of its type, with original timber flooring, original ceiling, and large banks of hopper windows to the street elevation.

The place is important because of its aesthetic significance.

The Soldiers' Memorial Hall has aesthetic value and makes a strong contribution to the civic streetscape of this part of Ruthven Street. The form and massing of the front section of the building reflect the adjacent 1900 Toowoomba City Council Chambers.

The place has a strong or special association with a particular community or cultural group for social, cultural or spiritual reasons.

Construction of the hall is also illustrative of the patriotic fervour associated with the First World War, and the community's identification with the British Empire at this period in Queensland's history.

The Soldiers' Memorial Hall has a special association with the Returned Services League and with other allied groups. It has a strong spiritual and social association with returned service personnel, and the general community, as a focal point for Anzac and Remembrance Day commemorations. It also has a special association with the Toowoomba community because of its use by a variety of community organisations, most noticeably Rotary, and for many social functions, including many of Toowoomba's principal balls and dances until at least the mid-1960s.
