= Kensington, Toowoomba =

Kensington
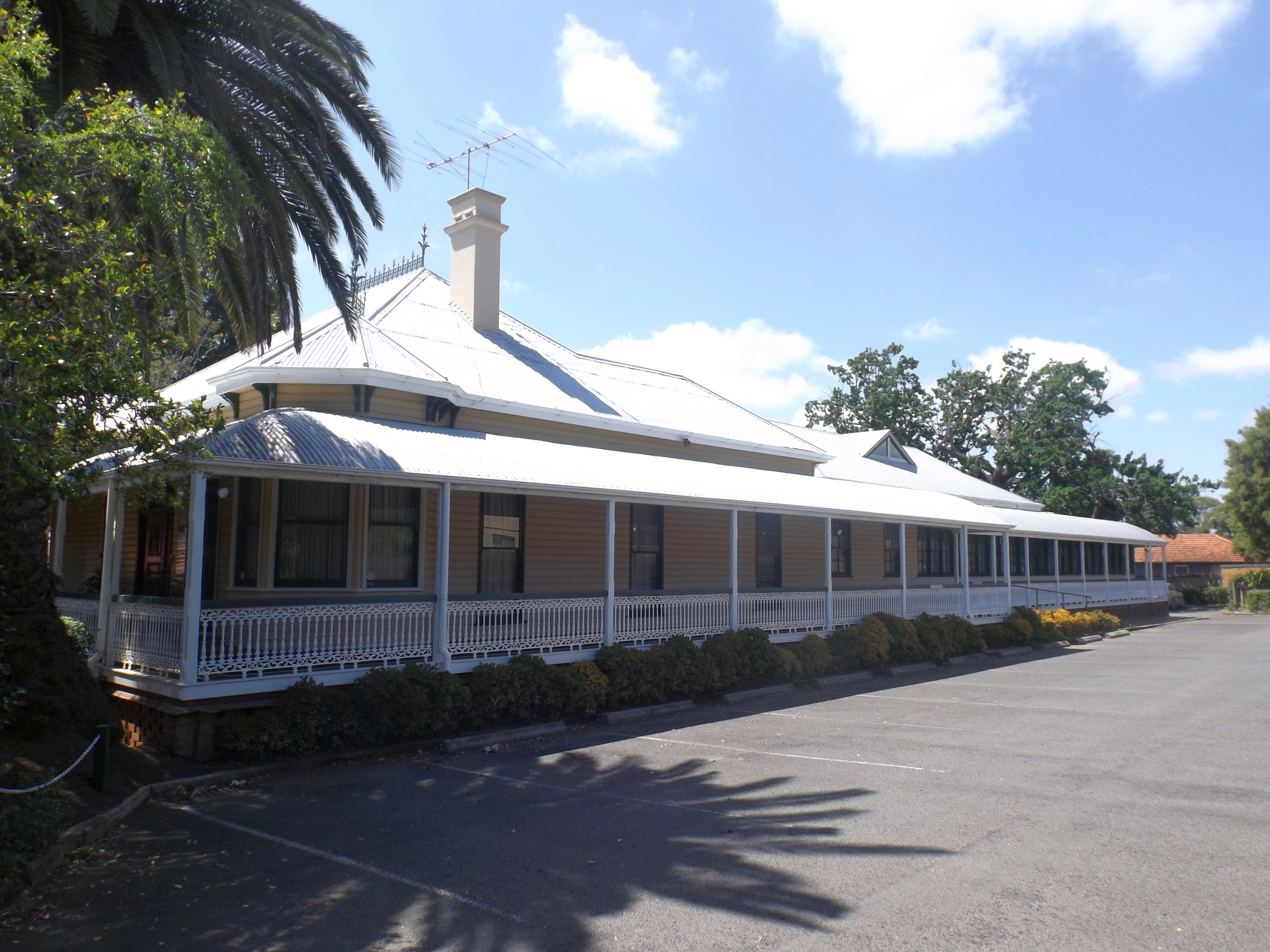
- Building and car park, 2014

- Location within Queensland Location within Australia
- 27.5584°S 151.9458°E
- Location: 126 Russell Street, Toowoomba, Toowoomba Region, Queensland, Australia

History
- Design period: 1870s–1890s (late 19th century)
- Built: 1897

Site notes
- Architect: William Hodgen Junior

Queensland Heritage Register
- Official name: Kensington
- Type: state heritage (built, landscape)
- Designated: 28 July 2000
- Reference no.: 601322
- Significant period: 1890s (fabric, historical)
- Significant components: garden/grounds, driveway, residential accommodation – main house, trees/plantings, steps/stairway

Kensington is a heritage-listed villa at 126 Russell Street, Toowoomba, Toowoomba Region, Queensland, Australia. It was designed by William Hodgen Junior and built in 1897. It was added to the Queensland Heritage Register on 28 July 2000.

== History ==
Kensington is a large, low-set, timber building at 126 Russell Street, Toowoomba. Toowoomba architect William Hodgen Junior designed Kensington in 1897 for successful draper George Pitlow Merry. Purchased in the early 1990s by a legal firm, Victorian architect Jack Clark was responsible for the refurbishment of the house and extension at the rear to create a building suitable for usage as a professional office.

William Hodgen established his Toowoomba practice with an advertisement in the Darling Downs Gazette of 6 February 1897 announcing he was a new Toowoomba architect. Growth and development in both Toowoomba and the Downs and his own efficient work meant he soon had a busy and successful practice. While trained in Queensland, his London experiences and knowledge of the Arts and Crafts movement and Edwardian Classicism were expressed in some of his buildings. However, he tended to employ a Free style, modifying the prevailing Queensland vernacular by introducing individualist elements. His English experiences are reflected in the classicist detailing of entrance pediments using timber, joinery and internal fittings. Hodgen was in practice for 43 years and he designed a large number of buildings varying from small cottages to sporting facilities, halls and large complex hotels in Toowoomba and on the Darling Downs.

Hodgen designed Kensington as a large timber residence of eight rooms costing £1,035. It was a variation on Hodgen's standard cottage plan with corner bay windows that were articulated in the form of the roof, the side elevations with a gable over the dining room bay window and secondary entrance and a box roof over the core. His design also included a butler's pantry, servery and outbuildings.

GP Merry established his millinery and dressmaking business in Ruthven Street in 1894. The Darling Downs Gazette and Toowoomba Telegraph of 22 December 1894 in an evaluation of Christmas offerings remarked that Merry had decorated his two windows in the Toowoomba Exchange for his first Christmas in Toowoomba. While he catered for men and women, his windows displayed millinery, dress material and all those articles necessary to complete a lady's toilet.

Merry took the opportunity of acquiring a large allotment when Kensington Estate with 38 cleared allotments between Russell, Margaret, West and Cecil Streets and close to the city, railway station, churches and schools was auctioned 25 March 1897. In his wife Sophia's name he acquired land adjoining the late James Taylor's Clifford House fence. While GP Merry was in trade, the Merrys were part of the Toowoomba social scene and used their home for entertaining friends. Irish born Mrs Merry a staunch member of the Methodist church was involved in various philanthropic work such as the Ladies Benevolent Society and Brodribb Home. GP Merry sold his business in 1905 and he and his wife took the opportunity to go "home" (England) for a visit.

Dr David Horn and his wife Amelia moved into Kensington in 1912. Scottish born David and his brother Alexander established Carlton High School in Christmas Street, Toowoomba, in 1897, but in 1901 the brothers decided to return to Scotland and study medicine at Aberdeen University. On their return in 1907 both established medical practices in Toowoomba.

Between February 1919 and August 1922 two different families occupied Kensington. Firstly Mrs Edith Pauline Brasnett wife of William Leslie Brasnett of Murwillumbah then George Harcourt Crowther.

Solicitor Arnold E Lavers, his wife Ruby (née Wilcox) and family moved into Kensington in 1922. Arnold Lavers resigned his position of First Clerk in the Crown Solicitor's Office moving to Toowoomba to become a partner in Groom and Lavers in 1909. He was a prominent member of the Queensland legal profession and in 1977 celebrated 60 years as a solicitor. Lavers, a founding member of the Toowoomba Rotary Club, was actively involved with the community and served on the Toowoomba Ambulance Brigade, Toowoomba Choral Society, Toowoomba Grammar School Trustees as well as being busy with the legal profession. After his death on 9 December 1968, tribute was paid to his long legal service to the Toowoomba City Council and the community. A former chairman of the Downs and South-Western Law Association Lavers was held in high esteem by the legal profession. A friend of George Essex Evans and Hoey "Steele Rudd", he supported the Ladies Literary Society and was well known for his love of poetry.

In 1972, Nancy Rae (nee Watson - formerly of Tandawanna and Surry in the Goondiwindi district and Pikes Creek near Stanthorpe) purchased the property after selling her Sydney retirement home. So commenced a painstaking renovation with a team of talented Toowoomba craftsmen. When Mrs Rae bought the property, there was still a WW2 air raid shelter in the back yard and a large timber coachhouse at the rear of the sprawling property. By 1973, the restoration was complete and Mrs Rae and her daughter Sue moved in. It was much loved by the extended family for a few good years before it became too big to manage and was sold again in 1977.

The house then became a family residence and doctors surgery. Kensington was up for auction in 1984 and an article "Links with past" in Queensland Grain Grower of 15 February 1984 stated that Kensington had been skillfully refurbished. While upgraded for modern living it retained its cedar doors and archways, marble, ebony and cedar fireplaces, and wide verandahs trimmed with lace panels, however, the kitchen had been modernised. The large master bedroom featured built-in robes and ensuite, the drawing room had a parquetry floor and was large enough for a grand piano. The large garden had exotic shrubs and native trees, while a mature oak tree provided privacy for the swimming pool.

Kensington opened as one of Toowoomba's superior restaurants in 1987. Features of this new restaurant were the entrance with intricate stained glass panels, original cedar doors, windows, architraves and skirting boards, but alterations involved removing a wall and fireplace to create a dining room that could seat 70 comfortably. The size of the house meant the use of the back of house for three bedrooms for the owner/manager and family, with family room, study, rear garden and swimming pool for private use.

In 1990 two law firms who combined to become one of the largest in Toowoomba purchased Kensington. They spent over $1,000,000 on restoration, expansion and landscaping using Melbourne architect Jack Clark. The firm moved into the 300 square metre house and rear extension of 450 square metres in July 1991, with the new premises officially opened by Governor-General Bill Hayden on 28 August 1991.

In 2017, Kensington is occupied by the Toowoomba-based law firm Hede Byrne and Hall Solicitors.

== Description ==
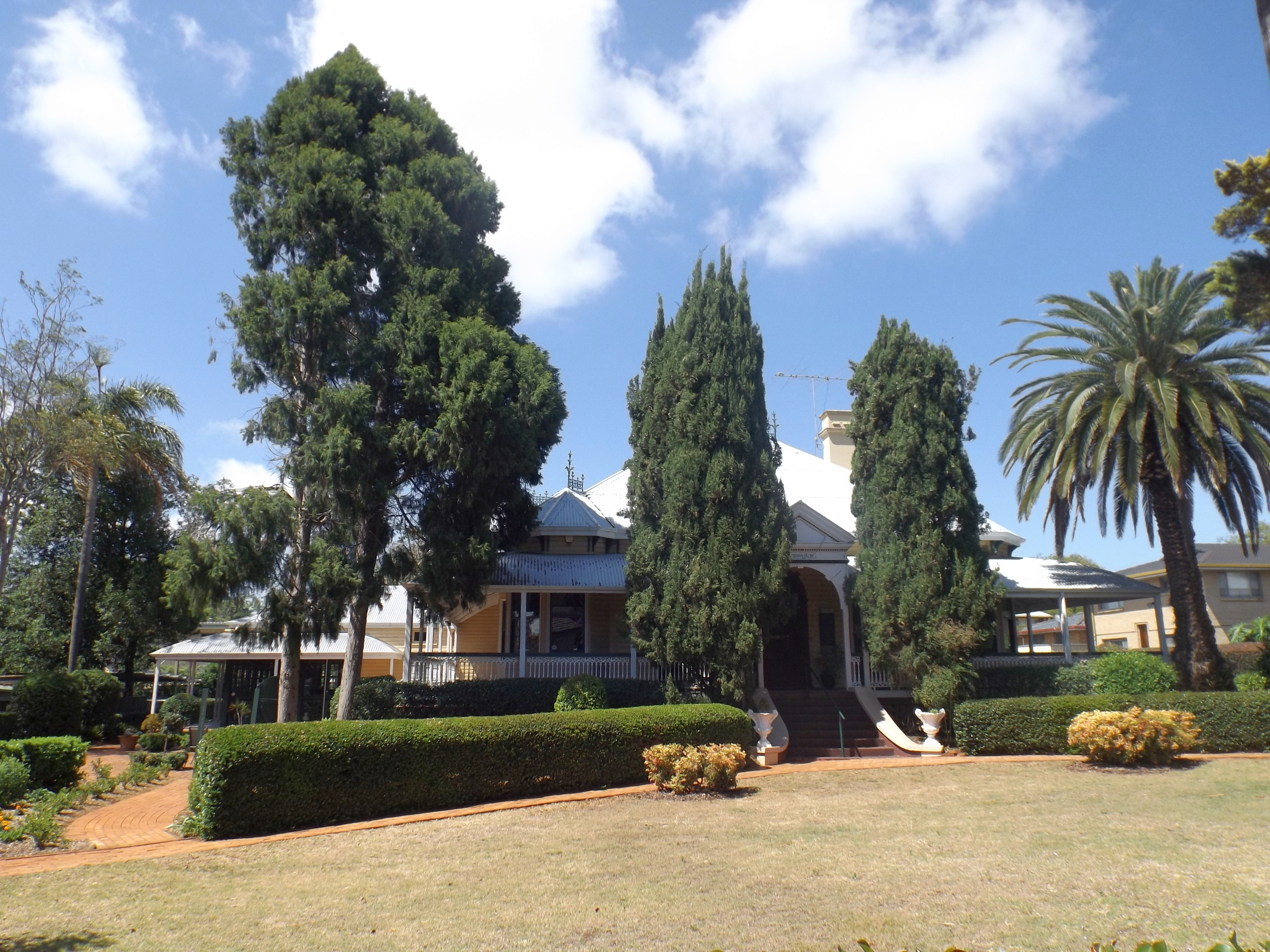
Garden and front entrance, 2014

Kensington is a single storey timber building located on a large block of land facing Russell Street, Toowoomba.

Kensington has a symmetrical front facade that combines Classical Revival and Arts and Crafts motifs. A central gabled entrance separates a pair of semi-octagonal corner bay windows that project above the roof. The steeply pitched corrugated iron hip roof rises to a widow's walk which features a finial at corners and cast iron lace. This roof capping is repeated for bays and side gable. Tall chimneys are symmetrically placed. While low-set it has a "hit-and-miss" brick subfloor.

Simple wide concrete steps lead up to a carefully detailed entrance bay, with the classical-style pediment resting on an arch supported by posts. The wide verandah, which wraps around to both sides, is edged with cast iron lace. Simple unadorned posts support the convex verandah roof that is stepped down from the superior roof with its pairs of brackets supporting the guttering. The eastern elevation has a projecting gable for the side entrance.

Connected to the house on the eastern elevation is the modern staff area which has a low-pitch hip roof. The extension at the rear of the house is a long rectangular building capped by a low-pitched roof. The encircling verandah employs the same decorative features as used on the older parts.

The front and side garden is landscaped and contains mature camellias, pines, palms and other trees, while low hedges edge paths. The long tree-lined drive on the eastern side leads to parking at the sides and rear of the property.

== Heritage listing ==
Kensington was listed on the Queensland Heritage Register on 28 July 2000 having satisfied the following criteria.

The place is important in demonstrating the evolution or pattern of Queensland's history.

Kensington a large timber dwelling was designed in 1897 by prominent architect William Hodgen as a private residence for successful draper GP Merry. Its usage as a family home for prominent Toowoomba identities such as solicitor Arnold Lavers, 1980s conversion to a restaurant and refurbished and extended in the early 1990s by Victorian architect Jack Clark for use as professional offices demonstrates the evolution of usage and form that occurs with Queensland houses.

Erected in the late 1890s Kensington, illustrates the pattern of Toowoomba's development as a regional centre for southern Queensland and demonstrates the principal characteristics of an 1890s ornate timber Toowoomba house.

The place is important in demonstrating the principal characteristics of a particular class of cultural places.

Kensington is a well designed and finely detailed house. It is an excellent example of a large timber home designed by prominent architect William Hodgen which contributes to the architectural character of Toowoomba.

Erected in the late 1890s Kensington, illustrates the pattern of Toowoomba's development as a regional centre for southern Queensland and demonstrates the principal characteristics of an 1890s ornate timber Toowoomba house.

The place is important because of its aesthetic significance.

It is an excellent example of a large timber home designed by prominent architect William Hodgen which contributes to the architectural character of Toowoomba.

The place has a special association with the life or work of a particular person, group or organisation of importance in Queensland's history.

It is an excellent example of a large timber home designed by prominent architect William Hodgen which contributes to the architectural character of Toowoomba.
