= Tor, Toowoomba =

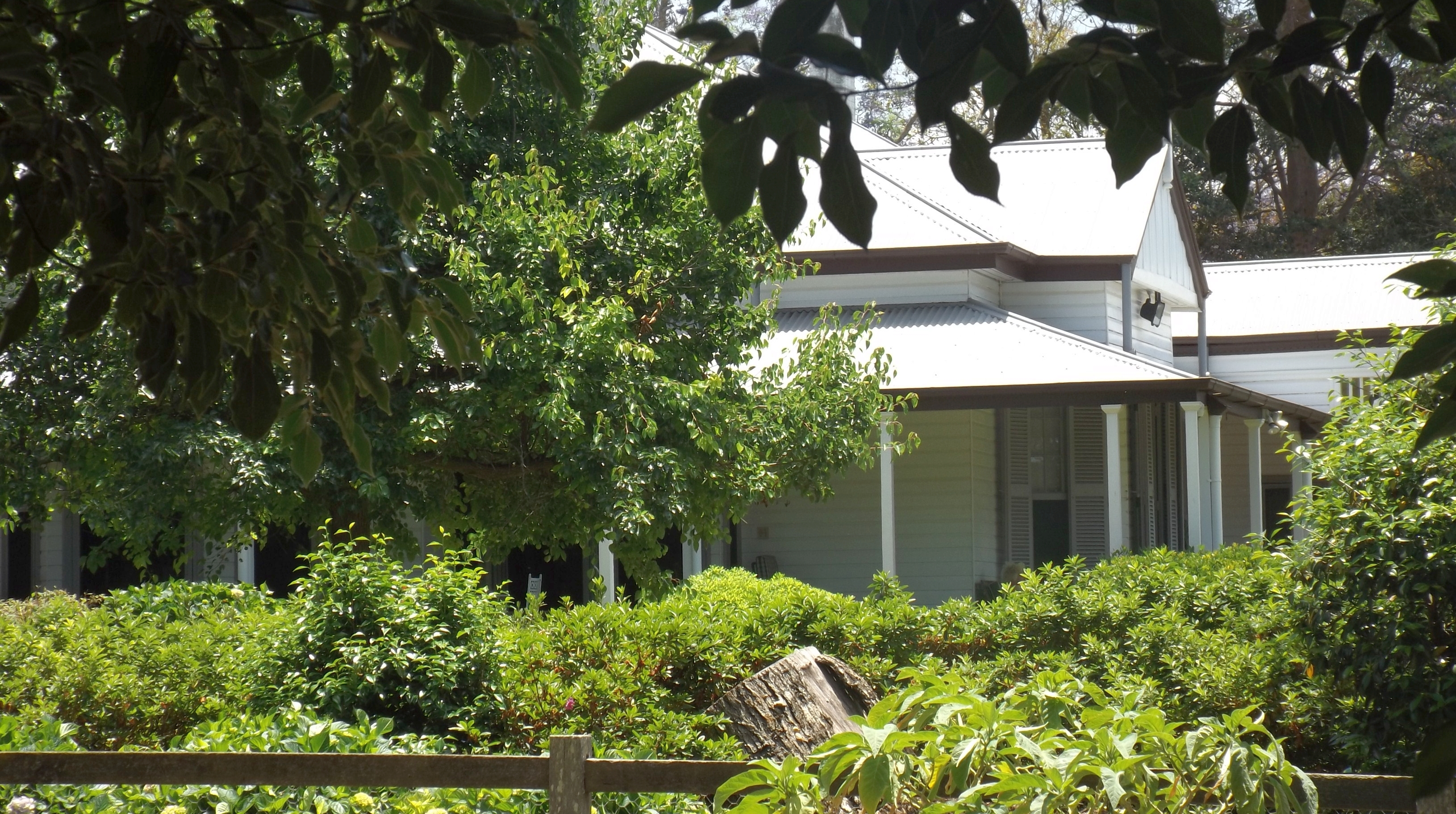
- Tor residence and garden, 2014

- Location within Queensland Location within Australia
- 27.5603°S 151.9287°E
- Location: 396 Tor Street, Newtown, Toowoomba, Toowoomba Region, Queensland, Australia

History
- Design period: 1900–1914 (early 20th century)
- Built: 1904

Site notes
- Architect: William Hodgen

Queensland Heritage Register
- Official name: Tor
- Type: state heritage (landscape, built)
- Designated: 28 May 1999
- Reference no.: 601325
- Significant period: 1900s (fabric, historical)
- Significant components: garden/grounds, tennis court, carriage way/drive, residential accommodation – main house, stables, service wing

Tor is a heritage-listed villa at 396 Tor Street, Newtown, Toowoomba, Toowoomba Region, Queensland, Australia. It was designed by William Hodgen and built in 1904. It was added to the Queensland Heritage Register on 28 May 1999.

== History ==
Tor, a single storey timber residence, was constructed in 1904 for Mrs Frederick Hurrell Holberton. The residence was designed by Toowoomba architect, William Hodgen, Mrs Holberton's nephew and built by John Sweeney.

The Deed of Grant for the land on which Tor was to be built was issued to Lucy Harriet Fletcher on 19 November 1860. The grant comprised Portions 155 and 156, an area of just over 60 acres. Title passed to William Lord in October 1861 who later subdivided the property in 1877. James Williams purchased subs 21–23 of section two of portion 155, in March 1877, which comprised just over eight acres. Title for the eight acres was transferred to Frederick Hurrell Holberton on 30 November 1888. The Holbertons subdivided their property again in 1915. John Mundell purchased three acres, on which stood the residence. Sophia Holberton held title to the remaining two acres, which passed to Edwin Chisholm Bernays in 1916, following her death.

Hodgen's first work on the site was in April 1903 when tenders were called for fencing. Sketch plans were prepared for the house before the end of February 1904 and tenders closed a fortnight later. John Sweeney's tender for £1,095 was accepted and a contract signed on 7 April 1904. Subsequent changes were made and further sketches were drawn. The extras for the changes (£53.4.0) was accepted on 6 June 1904 and the alterations added to the original contract drawings. By July, the roof framing was fixed.

While construction was proceeding, Hodgen had continued negotiations with his Aunt regarding many aspects of the house including, colour schemes and wall paper, as well as her requests for changes in window placements, verandah posts and mantles. At one point in a letter on 1 July 1904, Hodgen requests that his Aunt "...leave this to me to choose the best design I can for the money...". Despite his efforts to please his Aunt, Hodgen was unsuccessful. At the end of August 1904, she humiliated him on the site and he requested that someone else supervise the completion of the house. Their dispute may have been resolved as she paid full fees for his services in December that year (5% on the contract sum of £1020.18.0).

The dining room, drawing room and hall were all built with tongue and groove pine boarding which was then stamped with pressed metal ceilings. A pressed metal ceiling was also placed in the first bedroom. The foundations of the chimneys and hearths, carried up to the underscore of the metal plates, were constructed using blue stone set with lime mortar. The inner and outer hearths of all the fireplaces were laid with salt glazed bricks. Hodgen also designed the stable buildings which are still extant. The specifications book provides details about stumps, floors, walls and ceilings, fascia boards, windows, the coach house doors and the stable doors.

Frederick Hurrell Holberton died less than three years after the construction of Tor, however, title for the property had passed to Sophia in May 1902. On 4 June 1915, Tor was sold to John Mundell, covering an area of just over three acres. At around the same time Sophia purchased land in Campbell Street and again had Hodgen design a new residence. A small part of the property was subdivided in October 1959 for road purposes. The property was sold and subdivided again 1960 and the area of land was reduced from three acres to its current area of just over two acres. The present owners of Tor purchased the property in April 1966.

Later renovations to the building include altering the south-western wing to allow a kitchen to be built in the mid-1960s. The north-eastern and western verandahs were enclosed during the 1960s and early 1970s. Other changes include approval which was given in 1985 for the owners to build a garage at the southern end of the house.

In a study of the Toowoomba inner residential area prepared for the Toowoomba City Council in 1995, Tor was included in the section titled Places and Characteristics Valued by the Community.1

== Description ==
Tor is a low set timber residence bounded on the west by Tor Street, the east by Devon Street and on the north by Wombyra Street. The U-shaped residence is sheeted in chamferboard and has a corrugated iron roof. The house has a ridge roof extension above the dining room and a gabled roof kitchen extension at the rear. Verandahs enclose the house on three sides and the verandah roof is supported on timber posts. The rear (western) verandah has been enclosed. A section of the front verandah on the north-eastern side has also been enclosed. The entrance is centrally located under a projecting portico with gable. A staircase is positioned on the southern side of the entrance portico. A second staircase is located in the south-western corner of the verandah and a third along the western side. A timber finial and timber bargeboards decorate the portico, which has a pressed metal ceiling.

Internally, Tor contains a centrally located hall with rooms opening off from both the western and eastern sides. Similar to other rooms in the house, the hall has a pressed metal ceiling and extant cedar joinery. The hall has timber skirting timber cornices. The living room is located on the south-eastern side. The room has a bay window and an ornate pressed metal ceiling, with a recess located in the south-eastern corner. The recess also has a pressed metal ceiling. The room has two decorative moulded arches with moulded architraves and keystones. Originally enclosed, one of the archways has been opened up and is now a doorway.

A bedroom is located on the northern side of the entrance, the room has French doors opening to the northern end of the eastern verandah. This section of the verandah has been enclosed. The verandah returns on the northern side with French doors opening to the main bedroom. The bedroom has a high timber ceiling and fireplace with tiled surrounds. A walk-in wardrobe is located along the western side of the room. The pressed metal ceiling in the bedroom has been replaced with timber. On the northern side of the hall are located two bathrooms and a bedroom. The bedroom has a bay window opening to the enclosed western verandah.

The dining room, on the southern side of the building, opening from the hall, has an ornate pressed metal ceiling with a ceiling rose. The brick fireplace has a timber surrounds with decorative timber dentils. A bay window is located along the southern side of the wall. A door opens to the south-eastern corner of the verandah.

The kitchen, located in the south-western wing of the residence, was created when two smaller rooms were combined to become one large area in the late 1960s. A doorway in the north-western corner of the kitchen opens to the rear, or western, verandah. The verandah has been enclosed and contains a family room and bar area. This was closed over in the 1970s. Located in the north-western wing of the residence are four rooms. One larger room has been divided into three rooms and there is a bedroom located to the west of the three rooms.

Externally, Tor is located on top of a small elevation and is surrounded by a well-established garden containing mature boundary plantings. A carriage-drive beginning at the south-eastern corner, sweeps around past the entrance and finishes at the north-eastern corner. The driveway extends around past the southern side of the building leading to the modern garage and also to the original timber single-storey stable buildings, located in the south-western corner of the property. The front (eastern) elevation has views to the tennis court located in the south-eastern corner.

== Heritage listing ==
Tor was listed on the Queensland Heritage Register on 28 May 1999 having satisfied the following criteria.

The place is important in demonstrating the evolution or pattern of Queensland's history.

The architectural plans for Tor reveal the extent to which architects detailed their works c. 1900.

The place demonstrates rare, uncommon or endangered aspects of Queensland's cultural heritage.

Of particular importance are the stable buildings located in the grounds. Extant stable buildings forming part of the original layout of the property are rare and add to Tor's significance.

Extant architectural plans and documentation for domestic buildings from the early twentieth century are rare and add to the significance of the place. The material provides first hand information about the original design of the residence and its finishings and the stable buildings.

The place is important in demonstrating the principal characteristics of a particular class of cultural places.

Tor is significant as an example of well-to-do domestic building from the early twentieth century, reflecting the wealth and status of a public servant and his wife in Toowoomba, a major regional centre in Queensland. The residence is built in similar style to a number of other Toowoomba houses including Gabbinbar, Fernside and Harlaxton House, combining large, low-set homes often surrounded by extensive landscaped areas.

The place is important because of its aesthetic significance.

Tor is significant for its strong streestcape, forming part of a group of similar houses in the area including Weetwood and Ascot House. An elegant residence set on an elevation in a large garden with boundary plantings, tennis court and a sweeping carriage-drive, Tor has a high level of aesthetic significance.

The place has a strong or special association with a particular community or cultural group for social, cultural or spiritual reasons.

Tor holds strong social significance for Toowoomba residents and is highly valued by the community.

The place has a special association with the life or work of a particular person, group or organisation of importance in Queensland's history.

Tor is significant for its association with William Hodgen, a prominent Toowoomba architect, who designed the residence for his Aunt, Sophia Hope Holberton, wife of Frederick Hurrell Holberton. William Hodgen was the founder of a Toowoomba architectural firm which continues to the present.
