= Toowoomba Hospital =

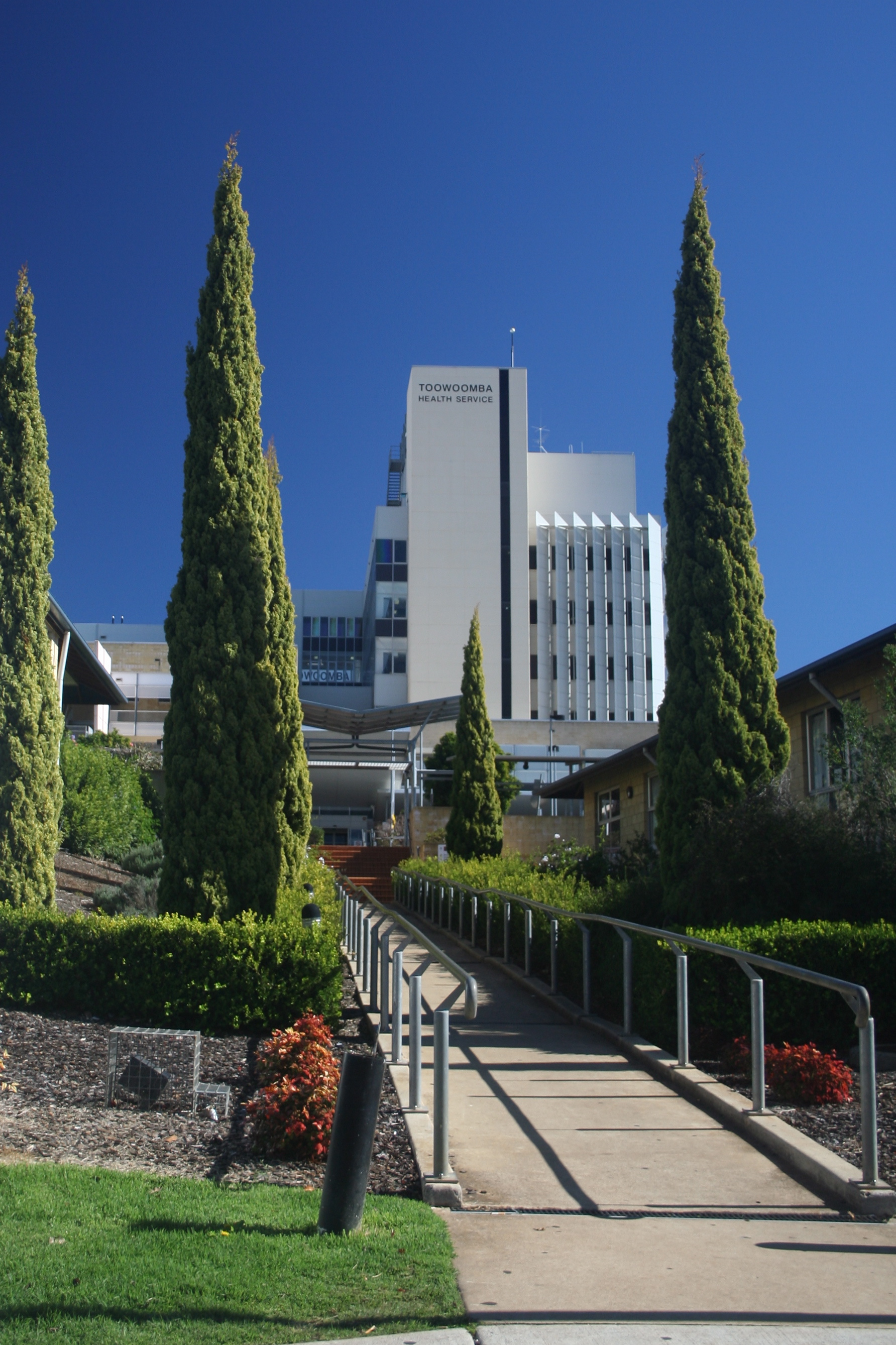

- Location within Queensland Location within Australia
- 27.56992°S 151.94555°E
- Location: Pechey Street, Toowoomba, Toowoomba Region, Queensland, Australia

History
- Design period: 1870s–1890s (late 19th century)
- Built: c. 1880–c. 1927

Queensland Heritage Register
- Official name: Toowoomba Hospital
- Type: state heritage (built)
- Designated: 28 July 2000
- Reference no.: 601296
- Significant period: 1880s–1920s (fabric); 1880s–1940s (historical, social)
- Significant components: fence/wall – perimeter, mortuary, pipeline – steam, ward – open air, gate – entrance, kitchen/kitchen house, trees/plantings, residential accommodation – quarters

Toowoomba Hospital is a heritage-listed hospital at Pechey Street, Toowoomba, Toowoomba Region, Queensland, Australia. It was built from c. 1880 to c. 1927. It is colloquially known as Toowoomba Base Hospital. It was added to the Queensland Heritage Register on 28 July 2000.

== History ==
The Toowoomba General Hospital was established on its present James Street site in 1880 as the third site of a public hospital in the city and its second permanent home. The hospital has been altered since its establishment with major phases of development in the 1890s–1910s; 1950s–1960s and more recently in the late 1990s. Two buildings remain extant from the 19th century and several remain from the early part of this century. It is these earlier buildings that comprise the focus of this report.

Early public hospitals were established for the provision of health care services for those people who could not afford private medical attention in their homes or in private institutions. Nineteenth-century Queensland hospitals were established by local voluntary hospital committees, which usually experienced some difficulty raising funds for both the establishment and running of the hospitals. Government grants were commonly available for the construction of hospital buildings. It was not until the Hospitals Act of 1923 that hospitals and public health became basic responsibilities of the government, resulting in the creation of hospital boards throughout the state who assumed control of local hospitals. Toowoomba Hospital was established during the voluntary committee period and was taken over by the Hospital Board following the introduction of the 1923 Act. From that time, development of the site was largely controlled by the Board.

The idea of erecting a hospital in Toowoomba was discussed with the very early services to be provided in the town –reflecting the importance of a local health service for the early town. Discussions began in 1856 in the nearby town of Drayton which was soon overshadowed in development by the more dramatic growth of Toowoomba and therefore, by June 1859 a small house was rented in Russell Street for the purpose of providing hospital services. By 1864 a timber hospital was constructed at the corner of James and Ruthven Street on land granted by the Colonial Government. This building was destroyed by fire on 25 December 1867, and plans for a brick building on the same site were drawn up by Richard George Suter, a Brisbane architect influential in hospital design in the late 1860s. Suter was an advocate for hospitals based on the pavilion plan principle, which maximized light and ventilation to all patients, and this early Toowoomba Hospital was one of the first examples of this principle, which was to remain current for the design of hospital buildings through to the 1930s.

For many years discussions were held about the inappropriateness of the hospital site, thought to be too close to the centre of the growing city. Ideally, 19th-century hospitals were sited away from the town or city centre on an elevated site which allowed enhanced ventilation of all buildings. The present James Street site was acquired in 1878, by which time Toowoomba was a large regional centre, servicing the requirements of a rich and fertile farming hinterland. The local Hospital Committee paid £870 for 29 acres of land on the present hospital site at the corner of James and Pechey Streets. £10000 was provided by the Colonial Government for the erection of buildings at this time.

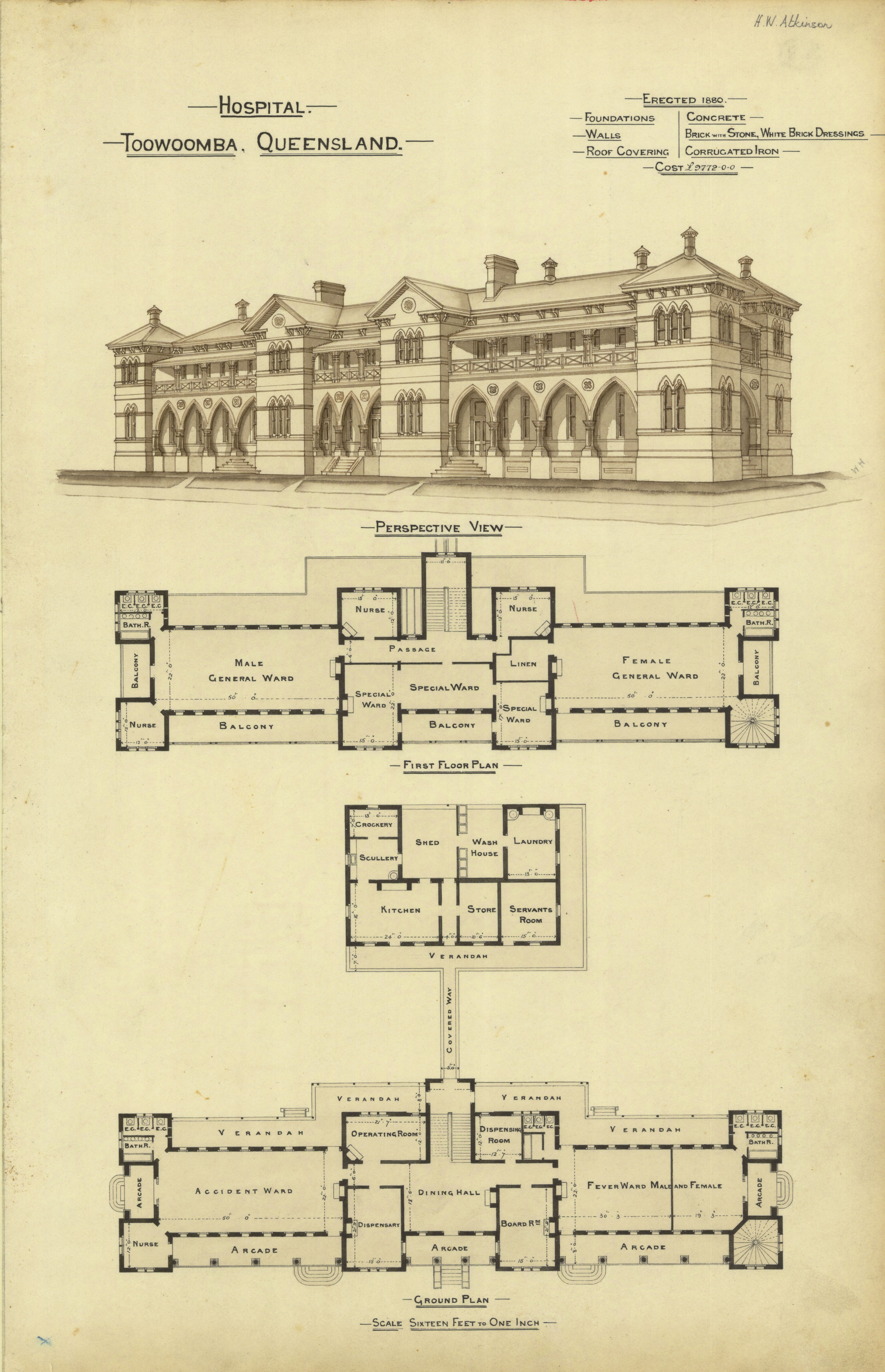
Architectural plans for the hospital erected in 1880 (now demolished)

The early buildings on the site were designed by Queensland Colonial Architect, FDG Stanley and included a large, two-storeyed complex with four wards each containing 16 beds. Attached to this main block by covered ways was a two-storeyed kitchen and laundry wing. The buildings constructed at this time were face brick with pointed-arched sandstone detailing, in the manner of many of Stanley's other large public buildings, including the Roma Street railway station and the Queensland Government Printing Office in William Street, Brisbane. Of the buildings designed by Stanley at the Toowoomba Hospital, only the kitchen wing remains. The hospital was ready for opening in 1880.

Staff accommodation and a medical superintendent's residence was erected in 1889, and a Victoria Wing was added to the principal ward building in 1899 for a cost of £2250, designed by local architect William Hodgen. An operating theatre designed by James Marks and Son was added in 1907. These buildings are not extant.

Harry Marks, from James Marks and Son also designed a small, decorative morgue at the western end of the hospital in 1896. it was not until the construction of this building that the morgue services were removed from the original hospital site in Ruthven Street. The morgue is a one-roomed building which was built for £158. Unlike the functional design of most morgues, the Marks designed morgue was richly decorated with timber fretwork on bargeboards, timber eaves brackets and roof detailing. This building remained in use until a new adjacent morgue was constructed in 1940. The 1896 morgue is now used as a store.

On 24 April 1912, Lady William MacGregor laid the foundation stone for a new nurses' quarters facing West Street, at what was originally adjacent to the entrance of the hospital. Now known as Freshney House and used as education and administration facility, this building was constructed for £5180 and designed by William Hodgen. Hodgen was born in Toowoomba and went to London to study architecture, returning in 1897 when he established private practice. He designed many fine Toowoomba buildings, mostly residences – integrating English-derived Arts and Crafts motif with Queensland building traditions. The design of Freshney House follows this trend, integrating a traditional Queensland two-storeyed building lined with deep double-storeyed verandahs, with Arts and Crafts motifs including art nouveau column and balustrade details, half-timbered gablets on the steeply pitched roof, and a pronounced entrance projection with over scaled classical detailing. Freshney House was constructed as a nurses' quarters and provided not only cellular accommodation, bathrooms and a dining room for nurses but also training facilities.

The open-air isolation ward was constructed in 1916. This building was constructed for the care of those with infectious diseases, on the principles of the miasma theory which suggested that because the germs were thought to be circulating in the air, health service accommodation should be isolated and maintained to allow the maximum flow of the air through the building, dispersing germs. A report in the Darling Downs Gazette, of 1921 describes the isolation ward as being in a distant corner and under the shade of several large trees. Several similar wards were constructed at hospitals throughout Queensland, but very few survive. The buildings were a Queensland innovation. The building was designed to have a ward which be open to the weather and was protected by canvas blinds rolled down from the eaves. The blinds were replaced by timber-framed walls due to the cold weather. A new open-air ward, closer to the main building, was constructed by the Commonwealth Government in 1921. This building does not survive.

By the 1920s the Toowoomba Hospital was one of the biggest and best-equipped in the state. Reflecting government reform and spending in the area of maternity and child welfare, a maternity wing was constructed in 1926. This building does not remain on the site and was replaced by a new maternity wing in the 1950s which is now used for the care of acute psychiatric patients.

In 1927 another nurses' quarters was constructed. This large, brick building now known as Cossart House, was designed to supplement the nurses' accommodation at Freshney House. The building was constructed like many hospital buildings during this time which, following the introduction of the Hospitals Act of 1923 which caused the establishment of many new hospitals and the augmentation of many existing hospitals. In addition the introduction of the Hospital Nurses Award of 1921 initiated a statewide project upgrading nurses' quarters, regulating standards of accommodation and working hours. Nurses' quarters were constructed all over the state in response to this Award. The building was renamed Cossart House, in commemoration of a matron, Ethel Beatrice Cossart in the 1940s. With the construction of a new nurses' quarters in the 1960s, Cossart House was used for other purposes and now houses educational and administrative facilities. Alterations have been made to the ground floor to accommodate new services.

By the 1950s advances in medical technology and an increasing Toowoomba population saw additional demand for hospital services, and the Toowoomba Hospital underwent major alterations, with the removal of early buildings and the construction of a number of substantial brick buildings. The buildings removed included the original 1880 hospital building and the 1926 maternity ward. The buildings were based on the multi-storeyed hospital building principle and included a maternity hospital in 1955 (now the acute psychiatric ward); a thoracic wing in 1956; nurses' quarters in 1960; new boiler house; steam laundry; kitchen and a surgical wing in 1960. Much of this phase of the building work was designed by Brisbane architects, Donoghue, Cusick and Edwards.

During the late 1990s another major building and development phase saw the construction of a breast screening clinic, a major new entrance wing to the medical block, multi-storeyed carpark and medical village to the east of the site. The medical village provides private consulting rooms for medical and associated para-medical practitioners. This new construction concentrates services and facilities on the eastern end of the site, in contrast to the early hospital, which was mostly at the western end. In 1994, oral histories were recorded at the hospital with its staff members. These oral histories have been kept in the State Library of Queensland

== Description ==
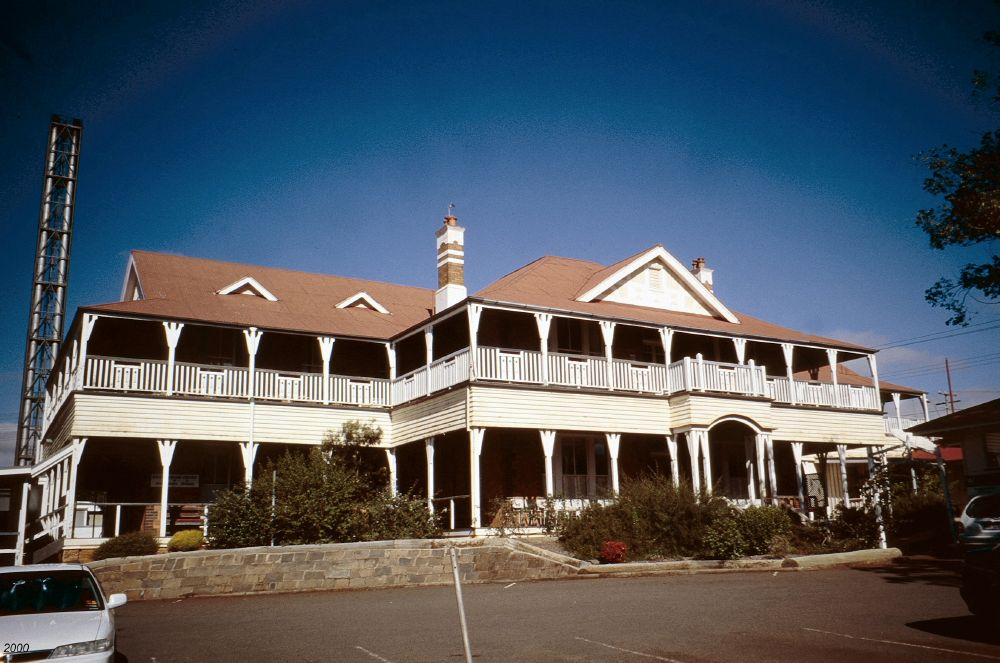
Toowoomba Hospital, 2000

The Toowoomba Hospital is situated on an 11.3-hectare site bounded by residences and facilities to the north, Pechey Street to the east, West Street to the west and the rear of residences along Joyce Street to the south. The site is 2 kilometres (1.2 mi) from the central business district of Toowoomba and is elevated, making it visible from a distance. The site contains about 25 buildings, most of which date from the 1950s onward. Most of the early buildings are located at the south-west corner of the site, and it is in this area that the heritage register boundary is located.

=== Freshney House (1912–13 Nurses' Quarters) ===
Freshney House is a symmetrically arranged two-storeyed face brick building lined on both storeys with wide, timber-framed verandahs. The building is located on the western boundary of the Toowoomba Hospital site, facing West Street, adjacent to the original entrance to the hospital. The building has a rectangular plan with central projecting bays on the northern and southern facades. Later additions have seen the floor plan further extended, but these are distinct from the original building.

The steeply pitched hipped roof of Freshney House is clad with corrugated iron and is half-gabled over the eastern and western ends and has projecting bays over the northern entrance wing. The entrance is emphasized on the roof with a large, half-timbered gablet with central ventilation panel. This gable detail is repeated at the half-gabled ends of the building. Smaller ventilation gablets line the main hipped roof of the building. Two face brick chimneys project symmetrically from the roof over the entrance wing. The roof encompasses the upper-storey verandah awning, which is supported on timber columns with elongated art nouveau brackets. These columns are repeated on the ground level. Lining the first floor verandah is a timber balustrade of battened timber with central decorative timber panels within each verandah bay, featuring an art nouveau motif. Forming the valance of the ground floor verandah and visually separating the two storeys is a wide fascia board clad with horizontal timber boarding which curves outwards, forming a skirt around the building.

Beneath the generous verandahs, Freshney House is a face brick building with stone quoining and rendered window and door surrounds. The building is lined with French doors, reflecting its original internal layout as separate bedrooms. The principal entrance to the building off West Street is expressed by a small balcony like projection in the first-storey verandah supported on paired timber columns, and featuring a segmental arched opening in the fascia skirt, lined with dentils. Smaller entrances of this type are found on the other facades of the building.

The ground-floor interior has been altered with the removal of original partitioning in the replanning of the floor. The first floor remains substantially intact, with original planning, and finishes including pressed metal ceilings.

There is a c. 1930s, timber-framed and fibrous sheeting-clad extension to the rear of Freshney House. Another, later annexe is found to the west of the building.

=== Cossart House (1927 Nurses' Quarters) ===
Cossart House is a large, square-planned, two-storeyed, face brick building with a large central open courtyard. The building is lined on all external and courtyard facing facades with double-storeyed verandahs. The hipped roof of the building is clad with corrugated iron and features eight large metal vents, one on each corner of the building and one at the midpoint of each wing. The vents are distinguished by their large size and number and have pyramidal roofs and corrugated iron-clad faces. The roofs of the building encompass the verandahs which are supported on timber columns on the first floor and brick piers separated by a deep, arched timber valance on the ground floor. The upper-storey verandah is lined with timber-battened balustrade.

The face brick faces of the building are lined with French doors, originally giving access to the individual bedrooms. The planning of the building is typical of accommodation, with central halls from which small bedroom were accessed. All of the rooms had further access to the encircling verandahs. Within the courtyard at ground-floor level is a covered walkway joining the northern and southern wings.

=== 1880 Kitchen (now specialist private clinic) ===
This is a two-storeyed, face brick structure, with hipped corrugated iron-clad roof and lined on all faces with square arched windows with rendered sills and heads. The building is sited at the rear of Freshney House and is linked via a series of covered walkways. This is the oldest building on the site and the only building remaining from the original complex. The building has been altered internally, but retains much of its external form and fabric, with the exception of verandahs which have been removed.

Extending from the eastern side of the original kitchen is an early covered walkway, supported on a variety of columns, including two large masonry columns with moulded caps and bases which may have been part of the original 1880 hospital. The ceiling of the walkway is clad with fibrous cement sheeting.

=== 1896 Morgue ===
A small, unusually richly decorated building on the southern end of the site, adjacent to Freshney House is an 1896 morgue designed by Henry Marks. The corrugated iron-clad, truncated hipped roof of the morgue is lined with decorative barge board details. The building is situated at the western end of the site, near to a 1940 morgue. This building is now used as a store.

=== 1916 Open Air Ward (now gardener's accommodation) ===
In the south west corner of the site is what was an open air ward comprising a small timber-framed building on a concrete slab. The building is lined with fibrous sheeting and the hipped roof is clad with corrugated iron. The former ward is set diagonally on the most elevated corner of the site and comprises a T-shaped plan. It is thought that the part of the building forming the upright of the T-shape was open to the weather and could be protected from the weather by canvas blinds lining the eaves of that section. Timber-framed walls have been constructed replacing the blinds. The other part of the building was built in and provided bathroom facilities, and other ancillary facilities. The building remains substantially intact, with the erection of external walls the major alteration.

=== Grounds ===
Within the area defined by the heritage register boundary there are several features which contribute to the significance of the site. These features include the large established trees, fence along West Street and rendered masonry gates from West Street and the steam reticulation service. This, like many other hospital sites is characterised as a hospital by the extensive network of metal reticulated steam pipes, elevated from ground level on a series of metal columns.

=== 1950s buildings ===
The 1950s buildings on the site are all two to four storeyed face brick modern structures, characterised by long thin plans, horizontal window bands, rendered concrete awnings, and flat concealed roofs. These buildings are not included within the heritage register boundary.

The largest 1950s building is located centrally on the site running from a medical block at the eastern end, with major extension housing surgery toward the western end. The 1955 maternity wing is a two storeyed face brick building in the south east corner of the site. The building is lined with horizontal window banks with cantilevered concrete awnings. A former thoracic block dating from 1957 sits on the north east corner of the site.

=== New work ===
The Toowoomba Hospital has recently been expanded to include a large new entrance and wards building, housing maternity and surgical services, a medical village for private practise and large administration and research buildings. Most of this development is at the eastern end of the site and is not included within the heritage register boundary.

== Heritage listing ==
Toowoomba Hospital was listed on the Queensland Heritage Register on 28 July 2000 having satisfied the following criteria.

The place is important in demonstrating the evolution or pattern of Queensland's history.

Toowoomba Hospital has historical significance as a good example of an operating public hospital dating from the 1880s, demonstrating phases of development reflecting changes in health care technology and public health conceptions. Freshney House and Cossart House, both former nurses' quarters are of particular historical interest in demonstrating the development of nursing education and the nursing profession in the state.

The place demonstrates rare, uncommon or endangered aspects of Queensland's cultural heritage.

The hospital has two 19th-century buildings, one from the original complex which are rare in Queensland. The former open air ward in the north-west corner of the site is a rare surviving example of this type of building demonstrating the early treatment of contagious diseases. The former 1896 morgue is a rare surviving 19th-century morgue and an unusually decorative example of this building type.

The place is important in demonstrating the principal characteristics of a particular class of cultural places.

Individual buildings on the hospital site have architectural significance, in particular the 1912 Freshney House integrating Arts and Crafts detailing with traditional Queensland building characteristics; the c. 1927 Cossart House, a classically inspired residential building with large central courtyard and a hipped roof capped at regular intervals with unusual ventilation towers and the 1896 morgue, a small unusually decorative structure.

The place is important because of its aesthetic significance.

Individual buildings on the hospital site have architectural significance, in particular the 1912 Freshney House integrating Arts and Crafts detailing with traditional Queensland building characteristics; the c. 1927 Cossart House, a classically inspired residential building with large central courtyard and a hipped roof capped at regular intervals with unusual ventilation towers and the 1896 morgue, a small unusually decorative structure.
