= Toowoomba City, Queensland =

Toowoomba City
- Suburb
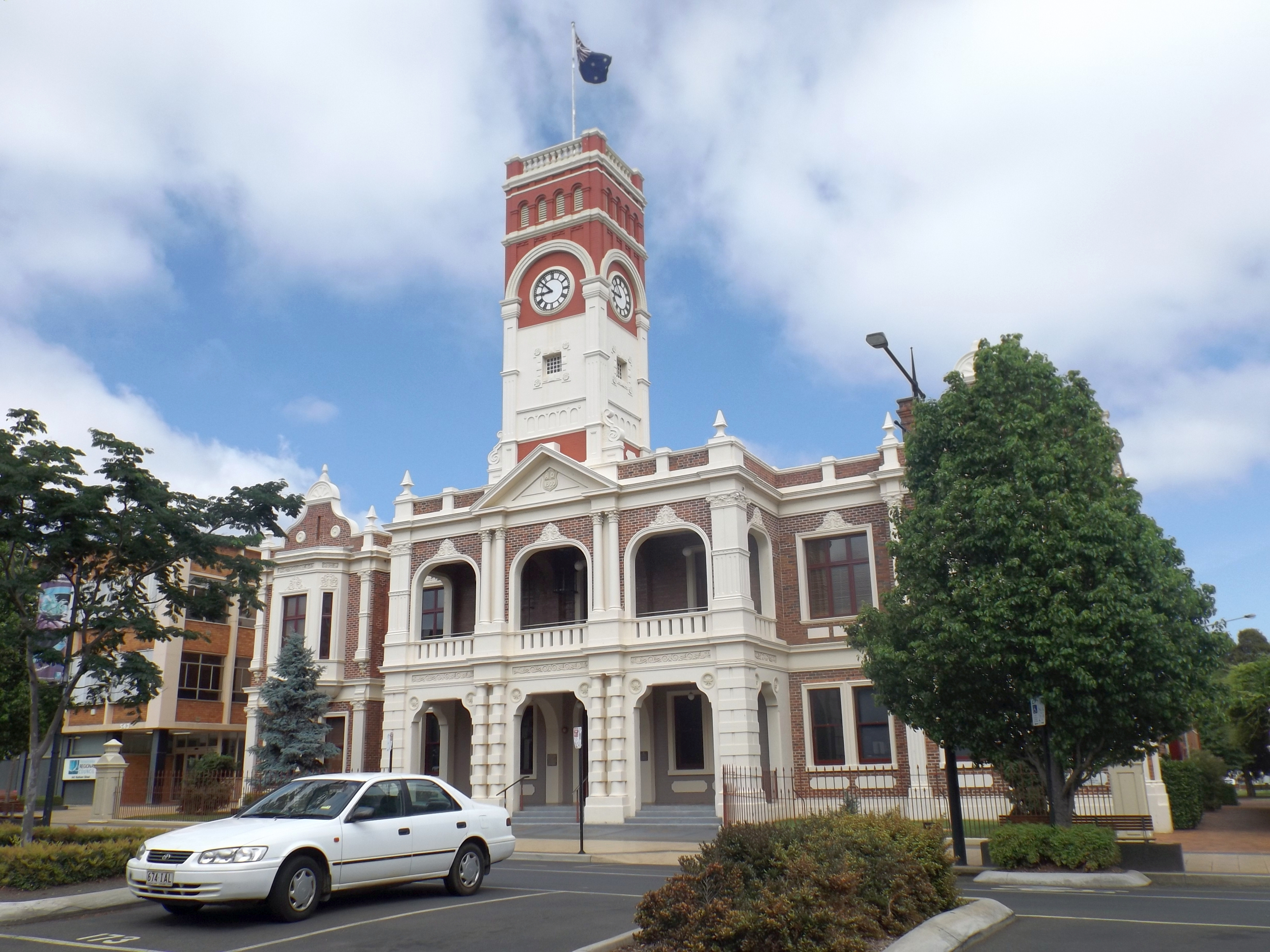
- Toowoomba City Hall in Ruthven Street

- Interactive map of Toowoomba City
- Coordinates: 27.5597°S 151.9508°E
- Country: Australia
- State: Queensland
- City: Toowoomba
- LGA: Toowoomba Region
- Location: 126 km (78 mi) W of Brisbane

Government
  - State electorate: Toowoomba North
  - Federal division: Groom

Area
  - Total: 2.7 km^{2} (1.0 sq mi)

Population
  - Total: 2,321 (2021 census)
  - Density: 860/km^{2} (2,230/sq mi)
- Time zone: UTC+10:00 (AEST)
- Postcode: 4350
Suburbs around Toowoomba City
Newtown	North Toowoomba	North Toowoomba
Newtown	Toowoomba City	East Toowoomba
Harristown	South Toowoomba	South Toowoomba

Toowoomba City is an urban locality in the Toowoomba Region, Queensland, Australia.

It is the central suburb of Toowoomba, containing its central business district and informally known as the Toowoomba CBD. In the 2021 census, Toowoomba City had a population of 2,321 people.

== Geography ==
The suburb is roughly rectangular, bounded to the north by Bridge Street, to the east by Hume Street, to the south by James Street, and to the west by West Street.

Toowoomba railway station is in Russell Street (27.5572°S 151.9519°E). It serves the city of Toowoomba, and is the junction and terminus for the Main Line railway from Brisbane, the Western railway from Cunnamulla, and Southern railway from Wallangarra on the Queensland – New South Wales border.

Mort Estate is a neighbourhood in the north-west of the suburb (27.5525°S 151.9469°E). It takes its name from an 1862 land sale by Thomas Sutcliffe Mort and Henry Mort.

== History ==
Toowoomba North Boys State School and Toowoomba North Girls and Infants State School both opened in 1869. In 1937, the two schools were combined to form Toowoomba North State School.

In 1881, a Baptist church opened in Toowoomba.

The Holy Name Primary School was opened on 23 January 1905 by the Sisters of Mercy who were already operating the school at St Patrick's Church (the church is now St Patrick's Cathedral and the St Patrick's school is now known as St Saviours School & College). The Holy Name school was burned down on 4 August 1919, so the school operated from the Mr and Mrs Hannant on the corner of West and Norwood Streets, until the school was rebuilt. Archbishop James Duhig laid the foundation school for the new church and school on 23 November 1919 and officially opened it on 23 January 1921.

The Toowoomba City library opened in 2016. The Toowoomba local history library opened in 1999 with a major refurbishment in 2016.

== Demographics ==
In the 2006 census, Toowoomba City had a population of 2,281 people.

In the 2016 census, Toowoomba City had a population of 2,088 people.

In the 2021 census, Toowoomba City had a population of 2,321 people.

== Heritage listings ==
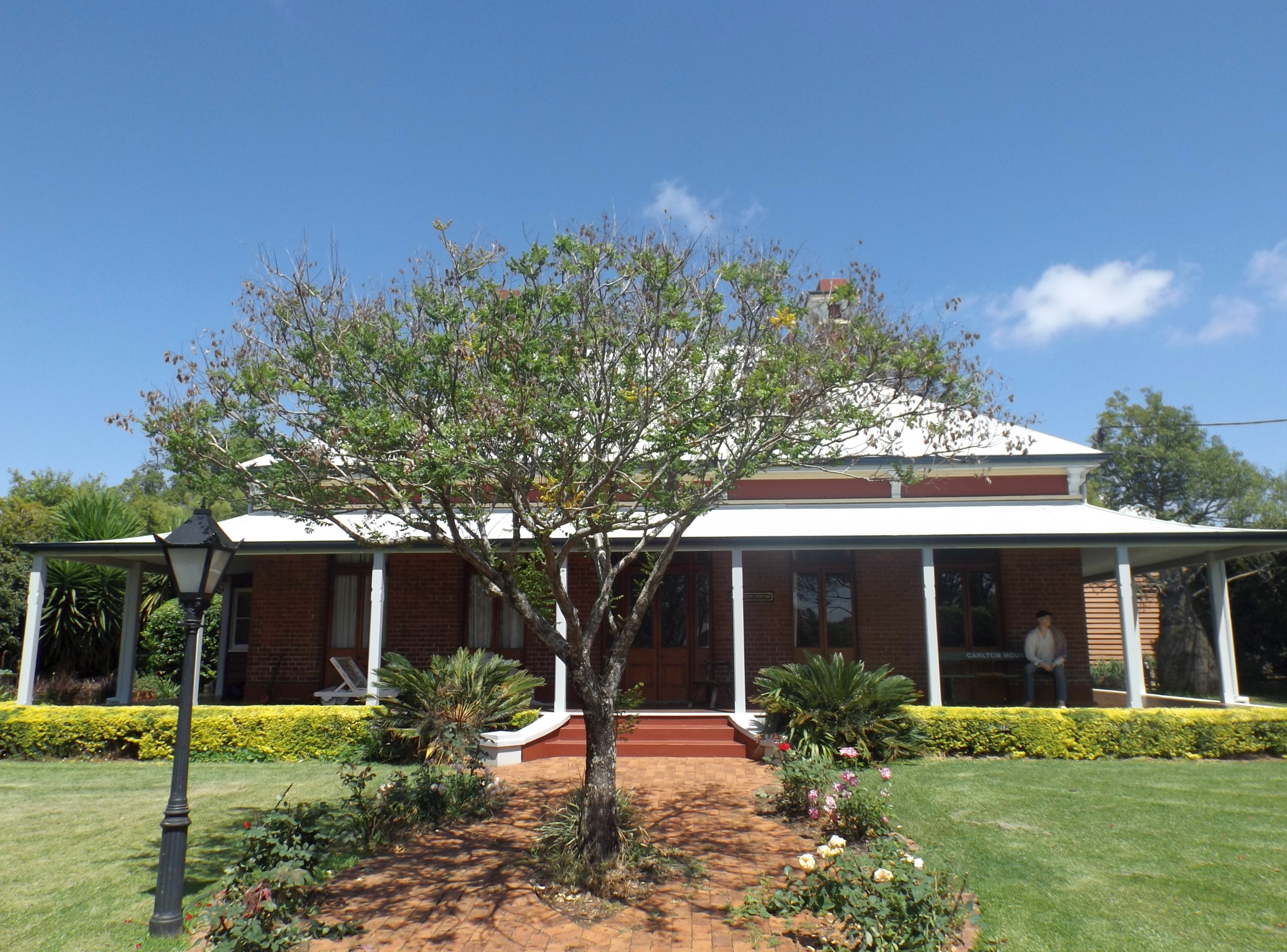
Carlton House, 2014

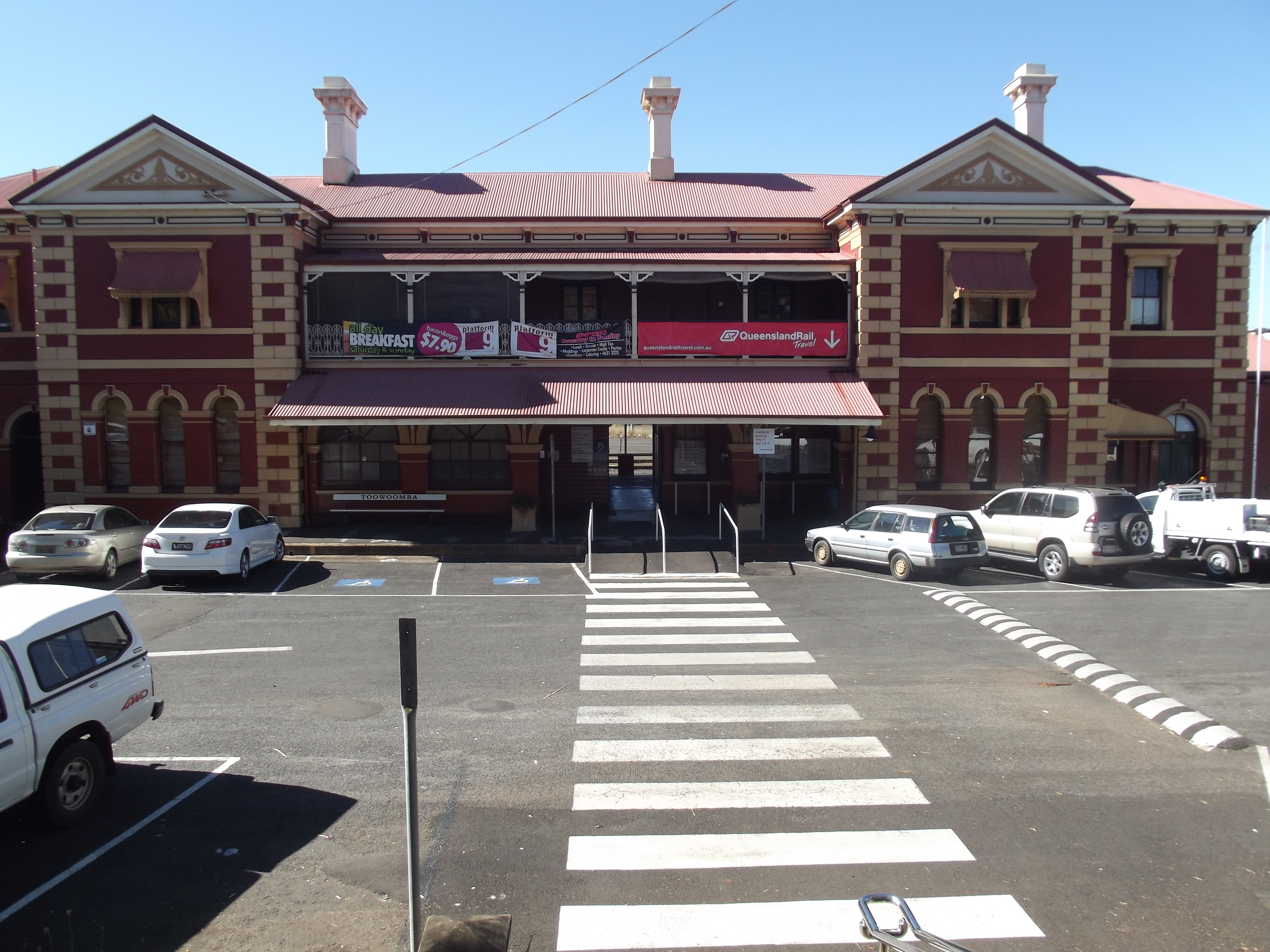
Toowoomba railway station, 2013

There are many heritage-listed sites in Toowoomba City, including:

- Tawa, 9 Boulton Street
- Harris House, 1 Clifford Street (27.5604°S 151.9471°E)
- St Luke's Anglican Church, Herries Street
- Soldiers Memorial Hall, 149 Herries Street
- St Luke's Church Hall, 152 Herries Street
- Toowoomba Post Office, 136 Margaret Street
- Strand Theatre, 159–167 Margaret Street
- Exchange Building, 245–253 Margaret Street
- Carlton House, 3 Mill Street
- Toowoomba North State School, 139 Mort Street
- St James Church, 145 Mort Street
- Toowoomba Court House, 46 Neil Street
- Toowoomba Police Station Complex, 50–52 Neil Street
- Wesley Uniting Church, 54 Neil Street
- Empire Theatre, 56 & 56A Neil Street (27.5631°S 151.9558°E)
- Men's Toilet, Russell Street
- Toowoomba railway station, Russell Street
- Toowoomba Permanent Building Society, 2 Russell Street
- Toowoomba Trades Hall, 19A Russell Street
- St James Parish Hall, 112 Russell Street
- Clifford House, 120 Russell Street
- Kensington, 126 Russell Street
- Wislet, 127 Russell Street
- Vacy Hall, 135 Russell Street:
- Toowoomba Foundry, 251–267 Ruthven Street
- Defiance Flour Mill, 269–291 Ruthven Street
- Pigott's Building, 381–391 Ruthven Street
- Karingal Chambers, 386–388 Ruthven Street
- Alexandra Building, 451–455 Ruthven Street
- White Horse Hotel, 456 Ruthven Street
- Toowoomba City Hall, 541 Ruthven Street
- Laurel Bank Park, corner of West Street, Hill Street and Herries Street (27.5624°S 151.9442°E)

== Shopping ==
Toowoomba City contains two significant shopping centres, presently under the same ownership. Grand Central Shopping Centre, with a GLA of 46,000 square metres (500,000 sq ft), contains the region's only Myer store, as well as a Coles, Target and 145 specialty stores. Garden Town Shopping Centre, across Gowrie Creek and containing a GLA of 12,434 square metres (133,840 sq ft) (2009), contains a Supa IGA supermarket, Best & Less and Lincraft along with 40 other stores. Both are currently owned by QIC, following its acquisition of Garden Town in January 2009 from Aspen Group, they are now being redeveloped to join via a two level galleria to form one shopping centre.

Two smaller centres, the Hooper Centre and a homeware centre, and street shopping along Ruthven Street round out the city centre's retail offerings. There is also a small shopping area on the corner of Ramsay and South streets called Southtown. It contains several eating places, supermarket, newsagent and Post Office.

== Transport ==
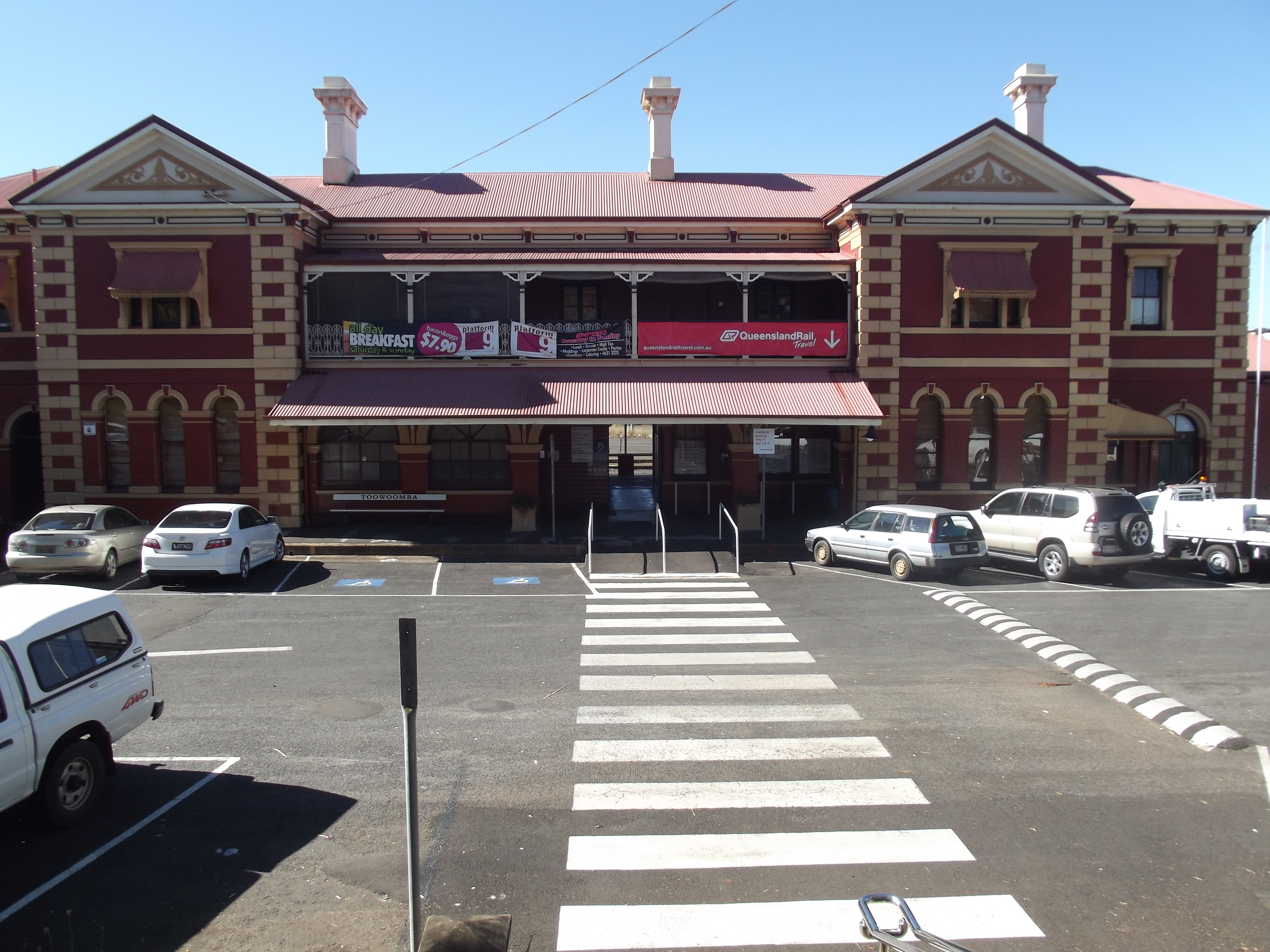
Toowoomba railway station, 2013

Toowoomba City is situated at the intersection of the New England Highway and Warrego Highway, and contains Toowoomba railway station (the terminus of the Westlander service). The city's bus interchange is on Neil Street, from which various buses depart for the suburbs. Toowoomba also has a taxi facility available.

== Education ==
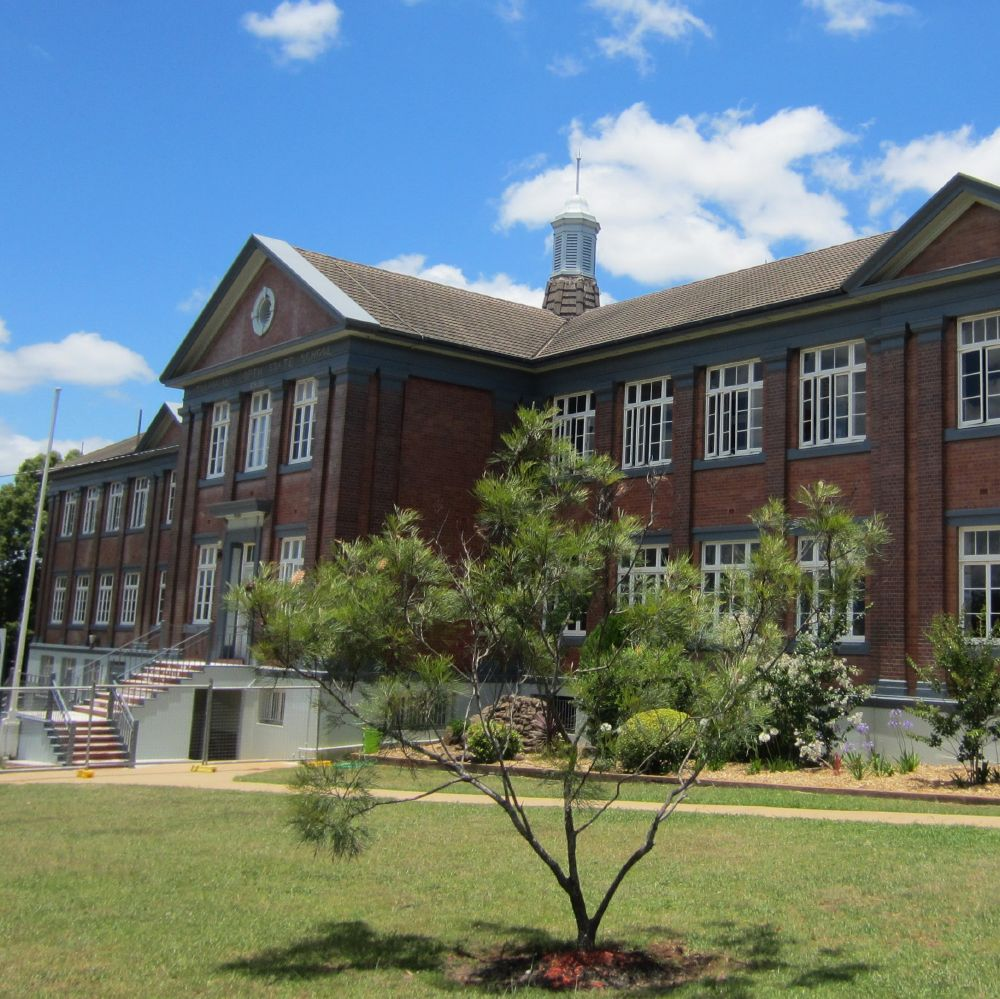
Toowoomba North State School, circa 2016

Toowoomba North State School is a government primary (Prep–6) school for boys and girls at 139 Mort Street (south-west corner with Taylor Street, 27.5565°S 151.9487°E). It includes a special education program. In 2015, the school had an enrolment of 157 students with 12 teachers (11 full-time equivalent). In 2018, the school had an enrolment of 142 students with 11 teachers (10 full-time equivalent) and 15 non-teaching staff (9 full-time equivalent).

Holy Name Primary School is a Catholic primary (Prep–6) school for boys and girls at 188 Bridge Street (27.5506°S 151.9467°E). It is a Mercy tradition school. In 2016, the school had an enrolment of 154 students with 12 teachers (10.3 full-time equivalent) and 8 non-teaching staff (5 full-time equivalent). In 2018, the school had an enrolment of 140 students with 11 teachers (10 full-time equivalent) and 9 non-teaching staff (5 full-time equivalent).

There are no secondary schools in Toowoomba City. The nearest government secondary schools are:

- Toowoomba State High School in Mount Lofty to the north-east
- Centenary Heights State High School in Centenary Heights to the south-east
- Harristown State High School in neighbouring Harristown to the south-west

== Libraries ==
The Tooowoomba City library is located at 155 Herries Street. The library is open seven days a week.

The local history library is located at 155 Herries Street. The local history library has a comprehensive archival collection that is of local, state and national significance, including the Robinson Collection named after Toowoomba's first female mayor Nellie E. Robinson. This comprehensive collection contains records from local personalities, businesses and community organizations.

Both libraries are operated by the Toowoomba Regional Council.

== Community groups ==
The Toowoomba branch of the Queensland Country Women's Association meets at 263 Margaret Street and the Toowoomba City Business Women's branch meets at 161 Margaret Street.
