= Exchange Building, Toowoomba =

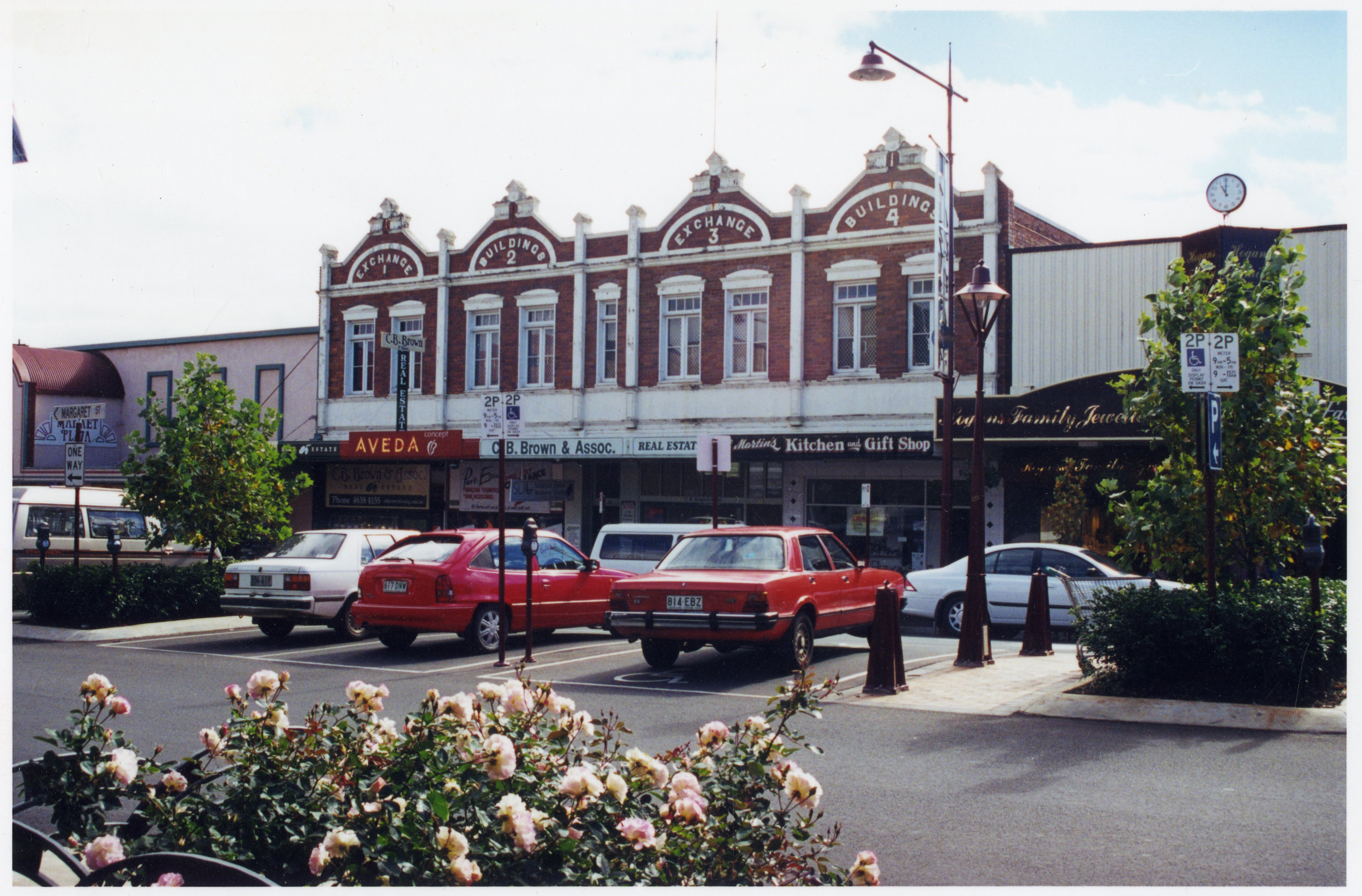
- Exchange Building, 1999

- Location within Queensland Location within Australia
- 27.5606°S 151.9525°E
- Location: 245–253 Margaret Street, Toowoomba City, Toowoomba, Toowoomba Region, Queensland, Australia

History
- Design period: 1900–1914 (early 20th century)
- Built: c. 1905

Site notes
- Architect: Henry James (Harry) Marks

Queensland Heritage Register
- Official name: Exchange Building
- Type: state heritage (built)
- Designated: 27 October 2000
- Reference no.: 601319
- Significant period: 1900s (fabric) c. 1905–ongoing (historical use)

The Exchange Building is a heritage-listed commercial building at 245–253 Margaret Street, Toowoomba City, Toowoomba, Toowoomba Region, Queensland, Australia. It consists of two storeys, with a row of four shops on the first floor with office space above. It was built by 1905, and designed by Toowoomba architect Harry Marks. It was added to the Queensland Heritage Register on 27 October 2000, and is considered significant for its aesthetic contribution to the streetscape of Margaret Street, for its status as surviving evidence of the early development of the commercial centre of Toowoomba, and for its association with Marks. As of February 2013, it was tenanted by a number of shops facing Margaret Street, with offices on the second floor.

== History ==
The Exchange Building is a two storeyed row of 4 brick shops, constructed by at least July 1905 to a design by prominent Toowoomba architectural firm, J Marks and Son.

The Darling Downs was settled by European pastoralists in search of rich grazing land and by the 1840s. The first township which evolved to support these stations was Drayton, west of Toowoomba. However the success of Drayton did not last. The site now known as Toowoomba was eventually considered to be in a more suitable location for access down the range and in 1852, a town survey was secured. The establishment of a new town was strongly supported by the squatters and Toowoomba challenged Brisbane as the new capital of Queensland. Although this status was not achieved, the town rapidly developed and by the 1860s had become the centre of pastoral development on the Downs.

As Toowoomba developed a commercial centre emerged in the blocks bounded by Russell, Ruthven and Margaret Streets and the construction of a police station and post office near the Toowoomba Court House (1877) firmly established the upper end of Margaret Street as a government precinct. By the 1890s the Russell, Ruthven, and Margaret Street block was pre-eminent as the commercial centre of Toowoomba.

Born and trained in Toowoomba, Harry Marks had entered into partnership with his father James, in 1892. James had commenced practice as an architect in Toowoomba by the early 1880s, and he and Harry have been described as dominating the architectural profession for more than half a century. Although Harry Marks was responsible for designing a number of buildings on both the Darling Downs and in Brisbane, much of his work was in Toowoomba where he designed a variety of buildings including Rodway, St James Parish Hall, and St Luke's Church Hall, additions to the Toowoomba Maltings, and the Darling Downs Co-operative Bacon Factory. Marks was also described as being gifted with inventive genius, and he devised and patented a number of architectural elements, including roof ventilators, windows and a method of stucco wall construction.

The Deed of Grant for the land on which the Exchange Building was to be constructed was issued to William Handcock on 11 May 1854. Title to the property was transferred to Thomas George Robinson in April 1877. T. G. Robinson arrived in Toowoomba in 1859. He established himself as a stock and land salesman in 1860 under the firm name of T. G. Robinson and Co. He was elected as a local alderman at a by-election in 1864 and served as Mayor of Toowoomba in 1865, but did not seek re-election. T. G. Robinson was connected with various progressive movements for advancement of the town and was instrumental in introducing stud stock to the town. T. G. Robinson's son, William Richard, was also involved with his father's business, taking over as sole proprietor following his father's death.

Following T. G. Robinson's death in 1883, title passed to Frederick Hurrell Holberton in August 1884. Holberton's wife was the aunt of prominent Toowoomba architect, William Hodgen. Hodgen designed the Holberton's residence, "Tor"), in 1904. Title transferred to James Holmes Robertson in December 1897 and, following his death in July 1904, Transmission by Death was issued to James Campbell Robertson, the third surviving child of James Holmes Robertson, Gordon Holmes Robertson, a minor born on 20 February 1885 and Robert George Wonderly, on 15 July 1904. Robert George Wonderly was the son of Joseph Wonderly, Mayor of Toowoomba from 1868–1869.

It was during the time of James Campbell Robertson's ownership, that the Exchange Building was extended. It was built by at least July 1905, as, at this time, J. Marks and Son, called for tenders for additions to No. 1 Exchange Buildings, Margaret Street.

James Campbell Robertson, stockbroker and soldier was born in Toowoomba in 1878. Following a distinguished military career, Robertson returned to Toowoomba where he set up a very successful stockbroking business. In 1936 he passed over the management of the firm to his son, Aylmer, resuming control again in 1939, when Aylmer was appointed to the 2/25th Battalion, AIF. Robertson died in Toowoomba in January 1951.

J. C. Robertson first appears in the Post Office Directories in 1929. He is listed as "JC Robertson, Stock and Share Broker". Street numbering appears in Margaret Street in 1931. At this time those listed at 249 Margaret Street are Hertzberg & Co (AM) Merchants; Downs Mercantile Finance Company Ltd; JC Robertson; Ocean Acct Corporate Ltd and GP Jackson, a jeweller and ironmonger.

Title for the property passed to Isabella Wonderly, wife of Robert George Wonderly, on 10 December 1905. Isabella held title to the property until her death in August 1956. Isabella leased the site to Robertson & Provan Pty Ltd. The terms were for five years from 2 June 1941. Provan & Co were booksellers in Toowoomba. However, Provan & Co remained at their offices at 403 Ruthven Street from 1942 until at least 1949.

The Exchange Building continues to be utilised for commercial shops and offices.

== Description ==
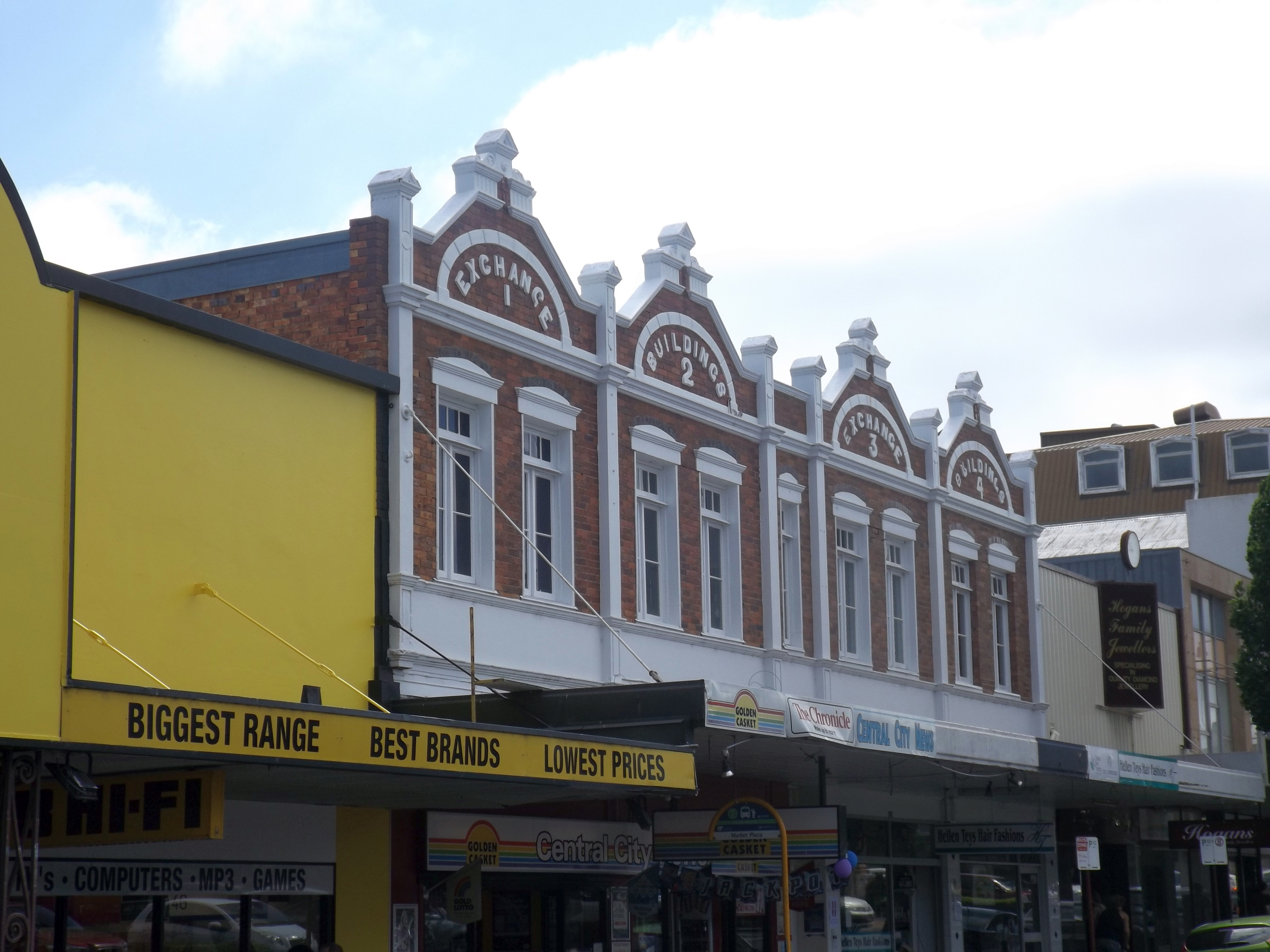
Building facade, 2014

The Exchange Building is a two-storeyed building consisting of a row of four brick shops at street level with offices above. The facade is red brick with contrasting white rendered detailing to the windows and parapets. The upper facade is divided into four with a central section that indicates the central staircase. Each of the individual tenancies is marked by a pair of pedimented casement windows and a triangular pediment in the parapet. The parapet has EXCHANGE BUILDINGS 1, 2, 3, 4 in raised lettering. The pattern of the paired windows, the pediments and interplay between the red brickwork and rendered architectural detailing results in a pleasing and economical composition for a commercial building.

Paired, timber, panelled doors lead to the central staircase which leads to offices on the first floor.

== Heritage listing ==
Exchange Building was listed on the Queensland Heritage Register on 27 October 2000 having satisfied the following criteria.

The place is important in demonstrating the evolution or pattern of Queensland's history.

Erected in the period at the turn of the century when Russell, Ruthven and Margaret Streets were being consolidated as the commercial centre of Toowoomba. The Exchange Building survives as evidence of the pattern of development of Toowoomba.

The place is important in demonstrating the principal characteristics of a particular class of cultural places.

Designed by prominent Toowoomba architect H. J. Marks the Exchange Building displays architectural finesse typical of Marks' design work.

The place is important because of its aesthetic significance.

The building has a decorative rhythmic facade which makes is a substantial aesthetic contribution to the streetscape of Margaret Street. It is one of a number of extant commercial buildings designed by the Mark's family that contribute to the architectural character of Toowoomba.

The place has a strong or special association with a particular community or cultural group for social, cultural or spiritual reasons.

The Exchange Building is significant for its association with the Marks family, a prominent architectural firm.
