= St Luke's Church Hall, Toowoomba =

St Lukes Church Hall, Toowoomba
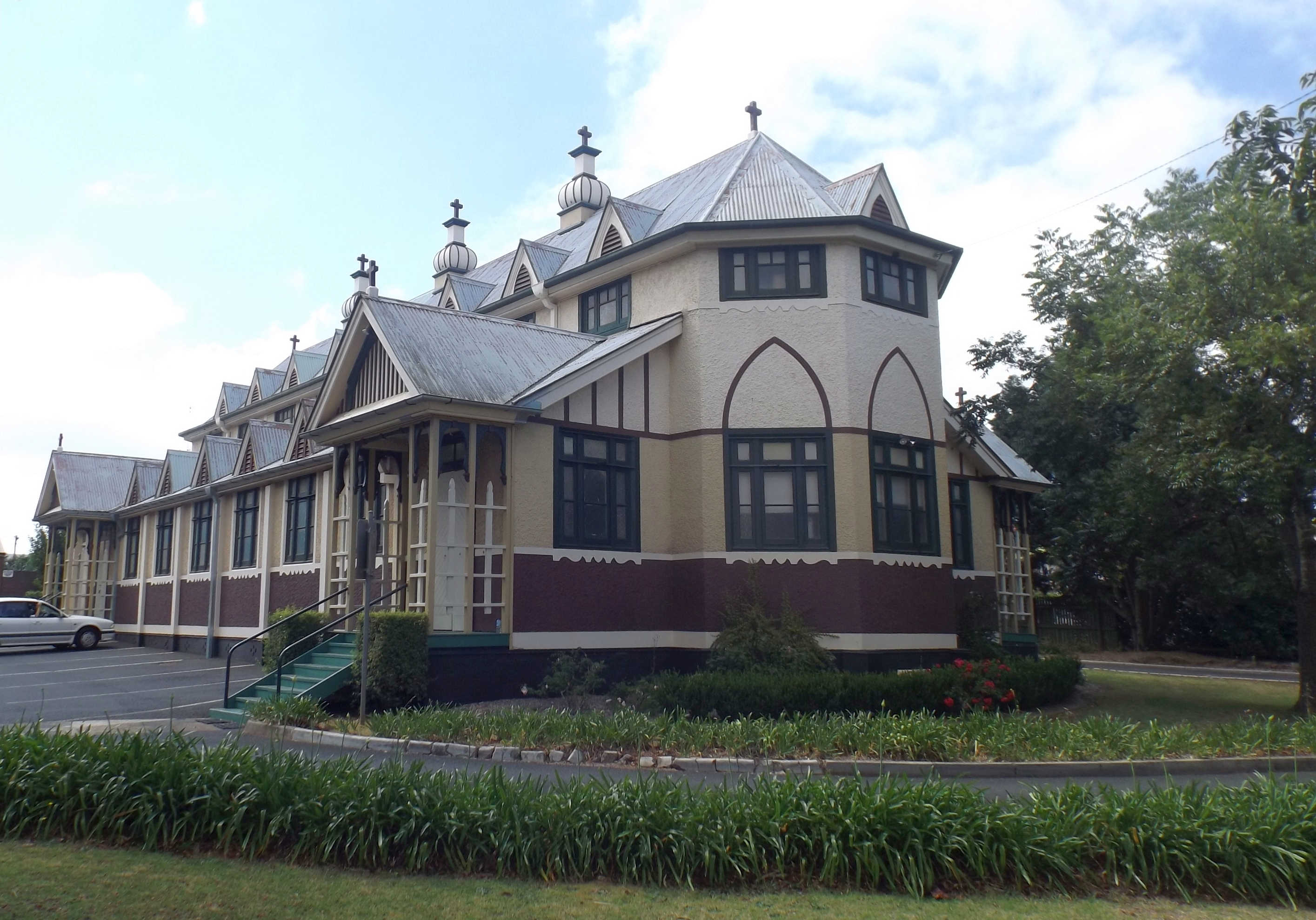
- Building exterior, 2014

- Location within Queensland Location within Australia
- 27.5657°S 151.9531°E
- Location: 152 Herries Street, Toowoomba City, Toowoomba, Toowoomba Region, Queensland, Australia

History
- Design period: 1900–1914 (early 20th century)
- Built: 1910–1911

Site notes
- Architect: Henry James (Harry) Marks
- Architectural style: Arts & Crafts

Queensland Heritage Register
- Official name: St Lukes Church Hall, St Lukes School and Parish Hall
- Type: state heritage (built)
- Designated: 21 October 1992
- Reference no.: 600866
- Significant period: 1910s (historical); 1910s (fabric) ongoing (social)
- Significant components: roof/ridge ventilator/s / fleche/s, views to, church hall/sunday school hall
- Builders: H. Andrews

St Lukes Church Hall is a heritage-listed church hall of St Luke's Anglican Church at 152 Herries Street, Toowoomba City, Toowoomba, Toowoomba Region, Queensland, Australia. It was designed by Henry James (Harry) Marks and built from 1910 to 1911 by H. Andrews. It is also known as St Lukes School & Parish Hall. It was added to the Queensland Heritage Register on 21 October 1992.

== History ==
St Luke's Church Hall, constructed in 1911, is a large, single-storey building, designed by H.J. (Harry) Marks of the prominent family of Toowoomba architects. It forms part of St Luke's church precinct at the corner of Herries and Ruthven Street.

The site is part of a continuing tradition of Anglican worship established during the first years of European settlement on the Darling Downs. Until the separation of Queensland in 1859, the Darling Downs were part of New South Wales and fell within the Diocese of Newcastle. The Reverend John Gregor visited the area, holding services in camps and private homes from 1840 until his death in 1848. The energetic Reverend Benjamin Glennie succeeded him and was appointed the first Incumbent for the Darling Downs in 1850. A parsonage was built at the "Springs" (Drayton) in 1851 but by then the focal point of activity on the Downs had swung some six kilometres northwards to an area known as "The Swamp", later to become Toowoomba. Glennie approached his Bishop for permission to buy land for a church there. He envisioned four churches, each dedicated to one of the evangelists, in the four major towns of the Downs, St Matthew's at Drayton, St Mark's at Warwick, St Luke's at Toowoomba and St John's in Dalby. In 1854 he purchased two acres of land in Ruthven Street for £8/4/- at one of the first land sales held for St Luke's.

In 1856 a 2-room schoolmaster's house was built on the land, followed soon afterwards by a slab building which combined the functions of church and school. The first service was held in March 1857. The building was soon inadequate and was extended, but a new and larger church, named St James, was built on land donated at Mort Street in 1869 and became the main Toowoomba church by default, although St Luke's had been intended as the parish church. Services were conducted alternately at the two churches and St Luke's was used for the Sunday School until 1883 when weekly services were recommenced and the church was again extended. The school function ceased in 1880 when state aid to denominational schools ceased.

In 1891, because of the growth of Toowoomba, St Luke's was established as a Parochial District and a new incumbent was appointed by the Bishop. The Reverend Thomas St. John Parry Pughe immediately set out to raise funds for a more suitable church. Plans were commissioned from Diocesan Architect John Hingeston Buckeridge for a stone church in 1892 and the new building was dedicated in February 1897. The old St Luke's continued in use as the parish hall, but must have seemed inappropriate to the enhanced status of St Luke's as well being inadequate in size.

The need for a new parish hall had become urgent by 1908 and a venue to conduct classes for primary school children was also needed. A building committee was appointed and by August 1909, architect Harry Marks had submitted plans for a building which would act as both a hall and primary school, the drawings for which were carried in the October Parish Paper. Tenders were called in January 1910 and subsequently, a contract was signed by H. Andrews for the sum of £1436.

H.J. (Harry) Marks was one of a remarkable family firm of architects which had a lasting effect on the appearance of Toowoomba, being responsible for a large number of public, private and commercial buildings. James Marks arrived in Queensland in 1866 and first set up in practice in Dalby, moving to Toowoomba in 1874. He entered into partnership as James Marks and Son with his eldest son Harry, who joined his father's practice in 1903, and Reginald who joined in 1910. Charles Beresford Marks, James grandson was also an architect working in Toowoomba and died in 1966. Harry Marks was innovative in his approach to design and patented several ideas for building systems and components. He was interesting in providing good ventilation and natural lighting and these are features buildings designed by him.

The foundation stone for St Luke's hall was laid by the Archdeacon of Brisbane Henry le Fanu on 28 May 1910 in the presence of a large and representative assembly of people and is inscribed "To the Glory of God and in memory of Benjamin Glennie, B.A., sometime Rector of Toowoomba." The Rector's Warden, Mr Frank Hooper, referred to the devotion of Canon Glennie who was virtually the founder of St Luke's from a material and temporal point of view. The late Canon Glennie had, he said, 54 years before purchased for £8 the two acres of land, and that day they saw the outcome of his foresight. The completed hall was opened on 11 April and dedicated on 15 May 1911 by the Archbishop of Brisbane St Clair Donaldson at a cost of £1554.

== Description ==
St Luke's hall stands at the corner of Herries and Ruthven Street to the south of the church and parallel to it. It is an unusual building and has a number of Marks trademark features and innovations including the use of extensive provision for light and ventilation, a patented construction method and flamboyant decoration.

The hall is single storey and is 80 feet (24 m) long and 40 feet (12 m) wide with a plan suggestive of that of a church, having a nave and side aisles. There are bays at each end which are flanked by pairs of gable roofed porches. The foundations are brick and the building is constructed of cement applied over chicken wire on a timber framework. This technique was also used by Marks for the Taylor Memorial Institute at St James' Church and the main building at The Glennie School, both contemporary with this hall. The main roof is hipped, clad with corrugated iron and has ventilating gables spaced right around the roof edge and along the side aisles. The ridge of the roof is capped with unusual ventilators reminiscent of Byzantine cupolas surmounted by crosses. Shallow triple casement windows are placed under the eaves beneath the gables forming a clerestory and larger sets of triple casements line the side aisles. Those in the western bay have flat heads with arched mouldings above them. The eastern bay has been extended to incorporate toilet facilities and a store. The four entry porches are supported on timber columns with elaborate capitals and are reached by low steps.

The interior of the hall is a large and well lit space with a timber floor and vaulted ceiling lined with timber. The nave has square timber posts on each side supporting the clerestory and is continuously arcaded. There is a modern kitchen in the western end and a stage at the other.

== Heritage listing ==
St Lukes Church Hall was listed on the Queensland Heritage Register on 21 October 1992 having satisfied the following criteria.

The place is important in demonstrating the evolution or pattern of Queensland's history.

As a large and elaborate Parish Hall designed by Toowoomba's most distinguished architectural firm, St Luke's Hall is a demonstration the development of the Anglican Church on the Downs and the importance of Toowoomba in the early twentieth century.

The place is important because of its aesthetic significance.

The hall forms part of the St. Luke's church group consisting of St. Luke's Church, the Hall, Rectory and Bell Tower and has high aesthetic value in its own right, making an important contribution to the character of the city of Toowoomba.

The place is important in demonstrating a high degree of creative or technical achievement at a particular period.

The hall features a number of Harry Marks innovative and patented design features from its basic construction method to finishing details such as ventilators.

The place has a strong or special association with a particular community or cultural group for social, cultural or spiritual reasons.

It has strong social links to the Anglican community in Toowoomba as the venue for many functions over the years.

The place has a special association with the life or work of a particular person, group or organisation of importance in Queensland's history.

St Luke's Hall has strong associations with the life and work of Harry Marks, one of a family of prominent architects in Toowoomba, and is also an outcome of the work of the Reverend Benjamin Glennie, an important figure in history of Drayton/Toowoomba who laid the foundations for the development of the Church on the Darling Downs.
