= Alexandra Building =

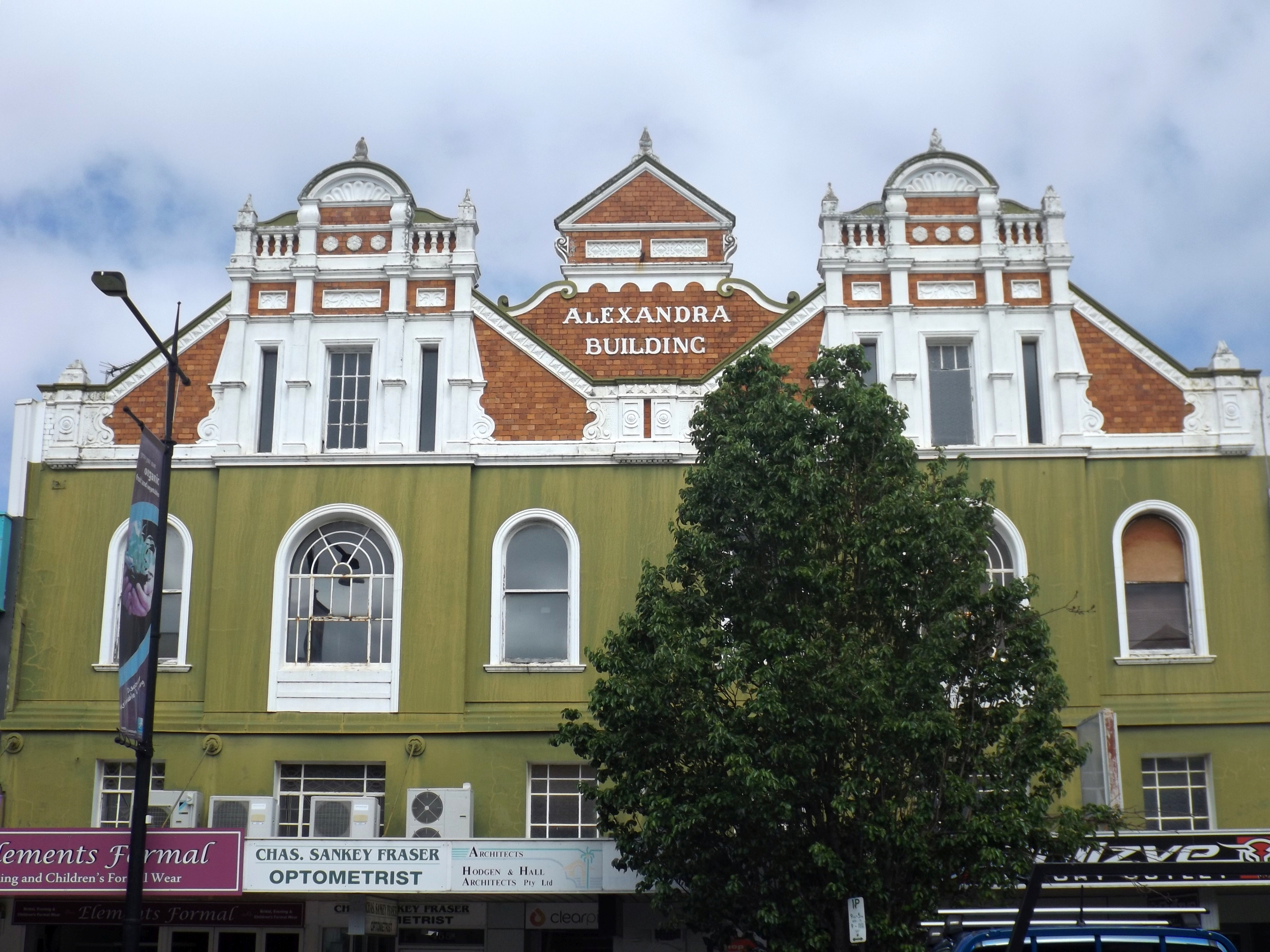
- Building facade, 2014

- Location within Queensland Location within Australia
- 27.5617°S 151.9528°E
- Location: 451–455 Ruthven Street, Toowoomba, Queensland, Australia

History
- Built: 1902

Site notes
- Architect: Henry James (Harry) Marks

Queensland Heritage Register
- Official name: Alexandra Building
- Type: state heritage (built)
- Designated: 16 October 2008
- Reference no.: 601317
- Significant period: 1900s
- Builders: James Renwick

Alexandra Building is a heritage-listed commercial building at 451–455 Ruthven Street, Toowoomba, Queensland, Australia. It was designed by Toowoomba architect Henry James (Harry) Marks and built in 1902 by James Renwick. It was added to the Queensland Heritage Register on 16 October 2008.

== History ==
The Alexandra Building, a two-storeyed masonry building in Ruthven Street, Toowoomba, was constructed in 1902 to a design by prominent Toowoomba architect Henry James (Harry) Marks (1871–1939) for local businessman Thomas Kelsall Lamb. Marks also designed a 1905 extension at the rear of the building. The building originally comprised a banquet/concert hall on the upper floor and two retail spaces on the lower floor.

By the end of the nineteenth century, Toowoomba had established its position as the administrative and commercial centre of the Darling Downs, one of the first regions to be settled in Queensland. Squatters entered the rich pastoral region even before Moreton Bay was opened for free settlement in 1842 and by the mid-1860s Toowoomba had eclipsed its main rival, Warwick, as the largest town on the Darlineg Downs. Located on the main route to Brisbane, it was a conduit for produce being hauled to the coast and the main source of supplies for the western pastoralists. By 1891, Toowoomba contained nearly twenty per cent of the population of the Darling Downs.

As Toowoomba developed, a commercial centre emerged in the blocks bounded by Russell, Ruthven and Margaret Streets. In the late nineteenth century and early twentieth century Ruthven Street was redeveloped with substantial masonry buildings and its pre-eminence as the centre of the city was confirmed with the construction of the third Town Hall (now known as Toowoomba City Hall) in Ruthven Street in 1900. The Alexandra Building, erected in Ruthven Street between Russell and Margaret Streets in 1902, contributed to the consolidation of this street as the city centre.

The Alexandra Building was constructed for TK Lamb and Co., a well-established Toowoomba firm of confectioners and pastry cooks. Lamb had operated from at least two previous premises in Ruthven Street as a confectioner, baker and caterer with associated refreshment rooms, since 1885. Lamb also had a separate bake-house in Bell Street and a second confectionery shop in another part of Toowoomba. Like many merchants in Toowoomba, TK Lamb and Co. supplied not only the town of Toowoomba but the Downs and many other parts of western Queensland through a very successful mail-order business selling hams, small goods, dressed poultry and Christmas cakes. In the 1890s and early 1900s he also conducted a drapery business - TK Lamb & Co. (The Busy Drapers) - in addition to his catering, confectionery and baking concerns.

In 1901 TK Lamb acquired title to the Ruthven Street site of the future Alexandra Building and engaged HJ (Harry) Marks to design a building incorporating street-level shops and a hire-hall for balls, banquets and other large public functions such as public meetings, wedding receptions, parties and concerts. In addition he planned to build a new, modern cake factory and bakery at the rear of the building.

Harry Marks was one of a family firm of architects which had a lasting effect on the appearance of Toowoomba, being responsible for a large number of the city's public, private and commercial buildings. Born and trained in Toowoomba, he entered into partnership with his father James, in 1892. James Marks arrived in Queensland in 1866 and first set up in practice in Dalby, moving to Toowoomba in 1874. As James Marks and Son, Harry and his father dominated the architectural profession for more than half a century. Though Harry spent his entire career in Toowoomba and was responsible for designing many buildings on the Darling Downs including Rodway and St Luke's Church Hall, he also designed St James Parish Hall at Coorparoo and another Roman Catholic Church at Bulimba in Brisbane. His brother Reginald joined the practice in 1910. Harry was made an associate of the Queensland Institute of Architects in 1925 and a Fellow in 1929. His son, Charles Beresford Marks, became a partner in 1925.

Harry Marks was described as being "gifted with inventive genius". He was particularly interested in providing good ventilation and natural lighting and these are features of buildings designed by him. He devised and patented a number of architectural elements, including roof ventilators, a reversible casement window which provides optimum directional ventilation and a method of stucco wall construction using a hollow wall to give the appearance of a solid wall, but cheaper to construct than brickwork.

The Alexandra Building was completed in 1902 by Toowoomba builder James Renwick. Various sub-contractors worked on the building including Wheatcroft and Co. (painters), TS Burstow (fittings) and Keogh and Co. (suppliers of the dining tables and other furniture). Its construction reflected local confidence in the continued prosperity of Toowoomba and the surrounding district during a period of widespread drought. It spanned two allotments and had a prominent two-storeyed frontage to Ruthven Street - considered "uncommon, and particularly striking" at the time - with an upper floor verandah with cast-iron balustrade, over the street pavement, and a decorative three-gabled face-brick parapet with the words "Alexandra Hall" in relief on the middle gable. The building was named in honour of Queen Alexandra, wife of Edward VII of Britain and of Australia. Edward had succeeded to the throne following the death of his mother, Queen Victoria, in January 1901 and the coronation of Edward and Alexandra was conducted in August 1902 around the time that TK Lamb's new building was opened.

The ground floor was divided into two shops, each 100 feet (30 m) long by 30 feet (9.1 m) wide, with plate-glass front display windows. The ceilings were high, and additional natural lighting was provided from high-level windows in the front and rear elevations. The northern shop was occupied initially by GP Merry's Drapery Emporium. The southern shop was occupied by TK Lamb and Co.'s Cafe Alexandra, which had counters and fittings in oak-grained pine, including a timber screen which separated the shop at the front from a dining room, 63 by 30 feet (19.2 m × 9.1 m), at the rear, capable of seating 180–200 persons. Kitchens, pantries, storehouses and outbuildings were located beyond the dining room.

The Alexandra Hall, which occupied the entire first floor, was accessed via a 7 feet (2.1 m) wide timber staircase from a separate entrance off Ruthven Street, located between the two shop fronts. It was a high space, 60 feet (18 m) wide by 100 feet (30 m) deep, lit by windows in the Ruthven street and rear elevations, and from six large lantern lights in the roof. At night the hall was lit by gaslights with "beautiful multi-coloured globes". Reputedly the hall was capable of seating 900 persons, and, when first opened, seats for 600 were provided. Facilities included cloakrooms, dressing rooms and water closets.

Four staircases led from the hall to front and rear verandahs, 12 feet (3.7 m) and 8 feet (2.4 m) wide respectively. These were located 4 feet (1.2 m) below the level of the hall, so that the retail spaces below were lit from windows front and rear, between the floor levels of the hall and verandahs. Another staircase led directly to the Cafe Alexandra dining room below, which could function as a supper room during concerts or other entertainments.

According to The Queenslander of 20 December 1902 construction of the hall supplied a much-felt want in Toowoomba, demonstrated by the almost continuous use of the hall in the first few months of opening. Toowoomba had lacked a large public assembly hall, and the Alexandra Hall's Ruthven Street location, in the centre of Toowoomba, made it especially attractive as a venue. The Alexandra Hall post-dated Toowoomba's third Toowoomba City Hall, constructed in 1900 in Ruthven Street on the site of the former Toowoomba School of Arts (destroyed by fire in 1898), but the City Hall theatre, with a seating capacity of 789, had a raked floor and could not accommodate banquets or dances. The Alexandra Hall pre-dated Toowoomba's Austral Hall, a large structure erected in 1904 by the Austral Association on the site of the Old Toowoomba Gaol in Margaret Street. It also pre-dated the Empire Theatre in Neil Street, which opened in June 1911 with a seating capacity of 2,200.

The Cafe Alexandra was said to be a great success and the Alexandra Hall was popular for dances, concerts and banquets. According to the Darling Downs Gazette rarely a night passed that it was not occupied. The venture proved so successful that in 1905 TK Lamb & Co. erected additions to the rear of the building, comprising a pavilion 32 by 26 feet (9.8 by 7.9 m) and promenade balcony. The pavilion was accessed via a flight of stairs from the Cafe Alexandra on the ground floor, and could be used as a supper-room, banquet hall, or meeting room. The ceiling was of pressed metal and the room was lit by reversible casements (recently patently by Harry Marks). The promenade balcony was located at the rear of the pavilion.

In 1913 Thomas Kelsall Lamb died, and the title to the property was transferred to trustees: Queensland Trustees Ltd and Lamb's two sons, Arthur Kelsall Lamb and Herbert William Lamb. In 1947 title was transferred to TK Lamb & Co. Pty Ltd (TK Lamb Estates Pty Ltd from 1949).

A number of long-term tenants occupied the building. JM Harris (draper) occupied the northern shop from 1906 until 1935. In 1938 Gold Radio Service and 4GR broadcasting moved into the building, where they remained until 197X. The upstairs hall appears to have been sub-divided and used for offices by the late 1930s, but the Cafe Alexandra continued to operate on the lower floor.

Sometime between 1937 and 1943 the front verandah was removed and replaced by a cantilevered street awning, in line with a municipal policy that verandahs and street awnings supported on posts be removed as a road safety measure. Below the parapet the front of the building was rendered and painted when the verandah was removed. About this time the lettering on the building appears to have changed from "Alexandra Hall" to the "Alexandra Building".

In 1973 title to the property was transferred from TK Lamb Estates Pty Ltd to the Master Builders Permanent Building and Bowkett Society. The Cafe Alexandra appears to have closed about this time.

When Brian Hodgen, grandson of well-known Toowoomba architect William Hodgen, purchased the building at auction in 1976 it housed Palmers Silk Centre, McKinstry and Somerville trading as Chas Sankey Fraser (optometrists), and Music Houses of Australia trading as Palings on the ground floor. The first floor was unoccupied. Brian Hodgen conducted his architectural practice, Hodgen & Hall, from the first floor space, later practicing with his son as Hodgen and Hodgen Architects.

== Description ==
The Alexandra Building is a two-storeyed masonry building with an elegant street facade on the western side of Ruthven Street in Toowoomba. It is located on a long and narrow site and consists of a 1902 building (hall and two retail spaces) with 1905 rear addition (former pavilion). Ancillary outbuildings and decks, and an adjoining c. 1930s-1940s buildings are located at the rear of the site.

The c. 1902 building consists of shops on the ground floor and lofty, open-plan office spaces on the upper floor. It has two long gable roofs (concealed behind a brick parapet) which extend from the Ruthven Street boundary about halfway back on the site. The two roofs are joined by a box gutter and each has three lantern lights along the ridge. External walls are smooth rendered brick and the roofs and floors are timber-framed. Behind the southernmost roof is the 1905 former Pavilion which has a simple hipped roof and external walls of rendered brick and corrugated iron. To the north of this structure (and immediately behind the northern gable) is a two-storeyed face-brick building (c. 1930s-1940s) with a parapet roof which faces on to Duggan Street and Lamb Lane at the rear.

The Ruthven Street facade of the Alexandra Building is a composition of red brickwork and contrasting rendered brick decoration which emphasizes the windows and other decorative elements. The parapet is the most ornate part of the facade and is divided into three pediments that reflect the internal design of the upper floor - two large triangular pediments concealing the gabled roofs each with three tall glazed openings either side of a smaller central pediment to which the words "Alexandra Building" is applied. Arched steel-framed windows light the upper floor and rectangular windows are located above a c. 1930s cantilevered street awning allowing light into the ground floor shops. Below the parapet, the exterior has been rendered and painted where a former two-storeyed verandah was located. Shop fronts have been recently fitted out.

Apart from the street facade only small sections of the exterior of the 1902 buildings are visible. At the rear the twin gable ends are visible and consist of smooth-rendered brick walls with three high-level windows matching those on the front elevation. Recent gable flashings have been added. A lean-to structure (post 1930s) has been added to the rear of the northernmost gable end which opens out on to the roof of the c. 1930s-1940s building which forms an open deck space. Side elevations are not visible, being concealed by adjacent buildings.

The lantern lights running along the ridge line of each gabled roof consist of box-like structures with curved roofs of corrugated iron. Three reversible casement windows face both north and south on each lantern. Walls to the east and west are clad in ripple iron. Gutters are quad-profile.

The 1905 former pavilion to the rear of the main building has a timber framed roof and floor. Walls to the north and the rear are of smooth rendered masonry. Other external walls (south and west) are timber framed and clad in vertically fixed corrugated iron. Three sets of high level timber framed, reversible casement windows run along both the northern and southern elevations. A small deck-like balcony (date unknown) has been added to the rear of the former Pavilion and a steel framed staircase leads to outbuildings at the rear of the southern side of the 1902 building.

The frontage of the ground floor of the 1902 building is divided into two shops which have again been subdivided forming four separate tenancies. All of these have been recently fitted out. An ornate and colourful leadlight window formed from steel encompassing the letter "A" is visible above the level of the street awning within the southernmost tenancy. Similar steel-framed windows with clear cathedral-patterned glass are located above a recess in front of the northernmost tenancy the shopfront of which is set back from the street. A central staircase formed in timber with timber wall linings opens on to the street and leads to a foyer space accessing the first floor offices.

Early internal fabric remains where later fit-outs have been inserted into the former Cafe Alexandra space on the ground floor including wall-paper, timber stairs, posts and balusters, timber wall linings and decorative cornices.

The first floor space, formerly the hall, has been divided in half along its length. Each space has a high vaulted ceiling. The space to the north remains an open plan area with the lantern lights running centrally along its length. Low level partition walls form office spaces. The space to the south has been partitioned with walls and glazing from floor to ceiling forming two separate tenancies. The vaulted ceilings though divided by the recent walls are still readable.

Much of the early internal fabric on the upper floor remains despite the southern side of this floor being subdivided into smaller tenancies with service areas. The ceilings, the internal walls of the lantern lights and high level walls on the upper floor are lined with v-jointed boards. Lower walls and the flat ceiling below the box gutter have been recently lined with plasterboard. Early timber posts and beams with arrissed edge details and which form buttress-like structures are visible along the length of the external walls which support the arched roof. Tenon joints showing the location of supporting timber brackets (removed) are visible on the posts. Metal stays brace the roof and are located at regular intervals within the open ceiling space. Timber stays are visible within the lantern light spaces. Early timber-framed stairs which access the street below have timber treads, risers and stringers all of which are clear finished. Timber newels with rebate details are located at the top of the stairs.

The former pavilion is a large, open room with high ceilings. It is accessed via stairs from one of the tenancies on the ground level. Walls have a smooth rendered finish to the north and part of the walls to the west. Other walls are lined in v-jointed boards. The lower sections of the internal walls are lined with plywood and timber battened sheeting. The ceiling is lined with decorative pressed metal sheeting with large pressed metal cornices finished with leaf-shaped cornice mitres in the internal corners. Two decorative circular pressed metal ceiling vents are located on the ceiling. Metal ceiling roses (former pendant fittings have been removed) are also located on the ceiling. Wall and window trims are clear finished timber. Floors are timber tongue and groove boards. A door formerly accessing a dumbwaiter is located in a small alcove on the southern side of the room. A concrete wash tub is located in the north-west corner of the room.

The stairs accessing the former pavilion are timber framed with treads lined with early linoleum. Handrails and balusters are both turned timber with a clear finish. Part of former balcony space with fretwork balusters is also accessed from the stairs. Stair walls are lined with plywood and v-jointed boards. The early ceiling fabric of the former cafe is visible from the stairwell space. Ornate timber posts and brackets, timber and sheet metal cornices, wallpaper, friezes and diagonally laid v-jointed ceiling boards are visible of the former above the suspended ceiling of the northernmost tenancies.

Other structures are located below the former pavilion building at the rear. These include an extension to the southernmost tenancy to form a larger shop space and an early amenities block formed in brickwork. To the north of these structures are extensions to the northernmost ground-floor tenancy (c. 1930s) as well as a c. 1930s masonry lean-to building housing amenities for the upper floor. A flat-roofed two-storeyed c. 1930s-1940s face-brick and concrete building is located in the north-west corner of the site. It has steel-framed windows on the upper floor and recent timber-framed windows on the lower floor. The interior of this building has not been inspected. The building's flat roof forms an open balcony space accessed from the lean-to addition above. Another timber-framed balcony structure is located behind the former Pavilion.

A recent courtyard and service driveway are also located at the rear of the site.

== Heritage listing ==
Alexandra Building was listed on the Queensland Heritage Register on 16 October 2008 having satisfied the following criteria.

The place is important in demonstrating the evolution or pattern of Queensland's history.

The Alexandra Building, erected in 1902 and extended in 1905, was constructed for successful Toowoomba confectioners and caterers TK Lamb & Co. Comprising a large former public hire-hall on the upper floor and shops on the ground floor, it is important in illustrating the consolidation of Ruthven Street as the commercial and social hub of Toowoomba, one of Queensland's principal regional centres, around the turn of the nineteenth and twentieth centuries.

Although intimately connected with the business of TK Lamb & Co., the Alexandra Hall also was one of the earliest large public assembly rooms erected in Toowoomba, pre-dating the Austral Hall (1904). It was popular for a variety of social functions including concerts, banquets, wedding receptions, dances and other public entertainments and meetings.

The place is important in demonstrating the principal characteristics of a particular class of cultural places.

The Alexandra Building remains substantially intact and is important in demonstrating the principal characteristics of an early twentieth century main-street commercial building incorporating a large hire-hall. These characteristics include: the imposing and decorative street facade; retail spaces on the ground floor; a large upper-floor hall with separate street entrance; the vaulted ceiling and decorative street-facing windows to the hall; and an attached former supper room with decorative pressed metal ceilings.

The building forms part of the body of the work of prominent Toowoomba architect HJ Marks and displays the inventiveness and creativity typical of Marks' design work. His concern for natural light and ventilation in his buildings is demonstrated in the Alexandra Building through the use of his inventive, and later patented, window design together with the placement of windows above street awning level to allow natural light into the ground floor shops and the use of lantern lights on the first floor.

The place is important because of its aesthetic significance.

The Alexandra Building with its highly decorated and articulated facade makes a substantial aesthetic contribution to the streetscape of Ruthven Street. Rising majestically above adjacent buildings it has a landmark quality generated by the imposing and ornate brickwork parapet facing Ruthven Street, and is one of a number of extant buildings designed by the Mark's family that contribute to the architectural character of Toowoomba. Interior spaces, designed to harness natural light and ventilation, are particularly fine.
