= Harry Marks (architect) =

Australian architect (1871–1939)

Henry (Harry) James Marks (1871–1939) was an architect in Toowoomba, Queensland, Australia. He was the architect of numerous buildings, many now listed on the Queensland Heritage Register.

== Early life ==
Henry James Marks was born in Toowoomba in 1871.

== Architecture ==
After training with his father James Marks, also an architect, he entered into partnership with him in 1892 as James Marks and Son. Harry Marks was considered a creative designer and was responsible for many buildings on the Darling Downs as well as two Roman Catholic Churches in Brisbane. During his career he invented and patented numerous ventilators, reversible casement windows and a method of stucco construction. He continued the practice into the 20th century and his son Charles Beresford Marks became a partner in 1925. In 1925 he became an Associate of the Queensland Institute of Architects, becoming a Fellow 1929.

== Later life ==
On 1 March 1939 while walking home for lunch, Harry Marks collapsed and died at the corner of Ruthven and Margaret Streets in Toowooomba. His funeral was held at St James Church of England in Toowoomba on 2 March 1939 and he was buried that same day in the Drayton and Toowoomba Cemetery.

== Works ==
- c. 1890: the extension ("folly") at Ascot House
- c. 1901: Gowrie House
- c. 1902: Alexandra Building
- c. 1904: Rodway, Toowoomba
- c. 1905: Exchange Building, Toowoomba
- c. 1910 Bishop's House, Toowoomba
- c. 1912: St James Parish Hall, Toowoomba
- c. 1916: Glen Alpine
- 1919: Goombungee War Memorial
- 1932: St John's Anglican Church, Dalby (3rd and current building)
