= Ascot House =

Ascot House, Toowoomba
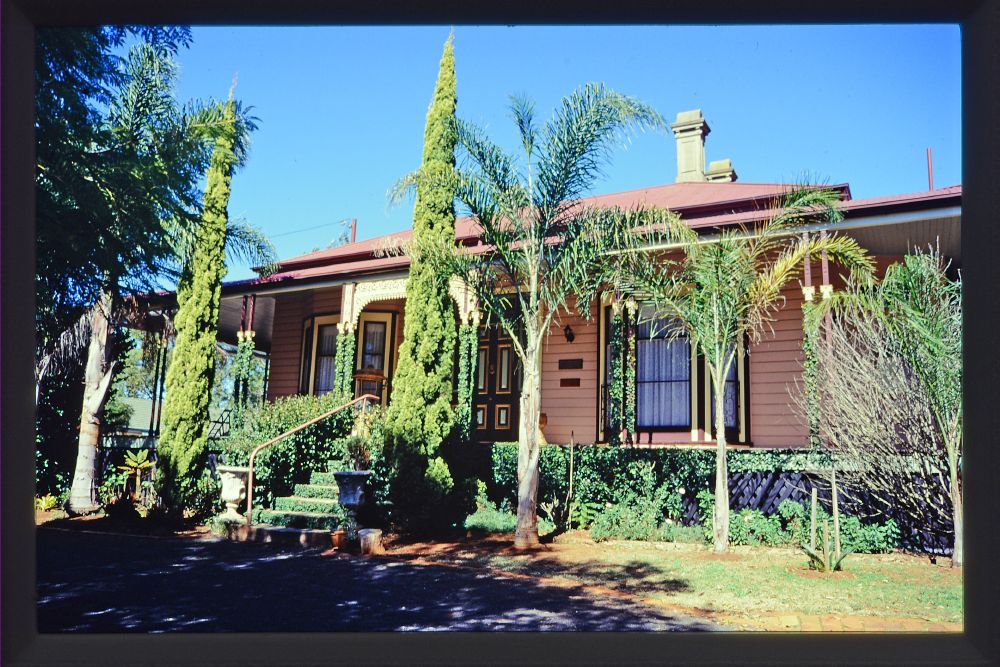
- Ascot House, front view

- Location within Queensland Location within Australia
- 27.5583°S 151.9293°E
- Location: 15 Newmarket Street, Newtown, Toowoomba, Toowoomba Region, Queensland, Australia

History
- Design period: 1870s–1890s (late 19th century)
- Built: 1870s–1890s

Site notes
- Architect(s): James Marks, Harry Marks

Queensland Heritage Register
- Official name: Ascot House
- Type: state heritage (built, landscape)
- Designated: 21 October 1992
- Reference no.: 600853
- Significant period: 1870s, 1890s (fabric); 1870s–1910s; possibly 1940s (historical)
- Significant components: pathway/walkway, ballroom, trees/plantings, pond/s – garden, service wing, garden/grounds, billiards room, residential accommodation – main house

Ascot House is a heritage-listed villa at 15 Newmarket Street, Newtown, Toowoomba, Toowoomba Region, Queensland, Australia. It was built from 1870s to 1890s. It was added to the Queensland Heritage Register on 21 October 1992.

== History ==
Ascot House, a single-storey timber residence with an attached two-storeyed timber extension, referred to as a folly, has been called the largest and most extensive of the grand Toowoomba residences. While the exact construction date is unknown, Ascot was possibly built in the 1870s as a private residence for Frederick Hurrell Holberton, a Toowoomba storekeeper and later Member of the Queensland Legislative Council. The architect of Ascot house remains unknown. When built, the house stood on about 32 acres (13 ha) of land near the Toowoomba racecourse. The grounds of Ascot contained a glasshouse, stables, croquet greens, tennis courts and extensive gardens, which included trees and shrubs bought from overseas.

Holberton sold the property to William Beit Jnr in 1894. William Beit Snr died suddenly in July 1872 before the birth of his son. The Register of the Queensland Parliament, 1860–1927 states that Francis Gregory, the owner of Harlaxton House, resigned as Mining Commissioner for Stanthorpe in November 1872 to take over the administration of the estate of his late friend William Beit, and the family moved to Westbrook. Gregory appears in the Post Office Directories as Station Manager, Westbrook, Toowoomba by 1874. By 1876, however, he is not listed as such. The Toowoomba Chronicle, on 30 November 1875, reported a court case between Sarah Beit, as plaintiff and a number of defendants including, Henry Beit (William Beit's brother) and Francis Thomas Gregory (as Trustees) as the defendants.

It is thought that William Beit named the house Ascot, reputedly because of his interest in horse racing. In the 1890s, Beit added a two-storeyed extension with a large billiard room, designed by Harry Marks to the original U-shaped house. The extension was a very elaborate design, suggestive of the superstructure of a ship, and was known as Beit's Folly. Beit was reputed to have had a distinctly artistic temperament which was reflected in the buildings he owned. The folly has become the distinctive architectural characteristic associated with Ascot House.

The architect of the "folly", Harry Marks, was a prominent Toowoomba architect noted for his highly creative work. Harry Marks was born in Toowoomba in 1871. After training under his father, architect James Marks, Harry entered into partnership with him in 1892 and spent his entire career in Toowoomba. During his career he invented and patented numerous ventilators, reversible casement windows and a method of stucco construction. He continued the practice into the 20th century and his son Charles Beresford Marks became a partner in 1925. Harry Marks became an Associate of the Queensland Institute of Architects in 1925 and Fellow in 1929. Harry Marks died on 1 March 1931.

Information from Anthony Battams thesis on William Hodgen states that, in 1899, plans were drawn by William Hodgen for extensions to the kitchen and stables. The builder for both of these projects was T. Olsen. There is also mention of a new cottage built for Beit in the same year, by G Gazzard and designed by Hodgen. It is not clear whether this cottage was built on the same property as Ascot House.

The Trustees Quarterly Review, April 1912 states that: Queensland Trustees Limited, as attorneys for Mr William Beit, also placed on the market the beautiful house and park lands known as "Ascot", and though the house property itself failed to find a purchase, the remainder of the estate found great favour with the public, and the whole lot was sold at the auction sale from £275 to £450 per acre.

Ownership passed to Frederick Ernest Bennett, a local Land, Estate, Stock and Station Agent, who bought it as a wedding gift in 1915 for his second wife Nancie Isabel Christoe Horwood. It remained a family residence for the Bennett family until it was requisitioned to station American troops during the Second World War.

The property was subsequently used for flats and has been progressively subdivided from the original 32 acres (13 ha) and it now stands on just over 2 acres (0.81 ha) of land. The house also suffered from the effects of vandalism during the 1970s. The current owner purchased Ascot House in 1984. Following extensive renovations, the two-storeyed extension of Ascot House, Beits' Folly, was opened as a tea room and house museum in 1994.

== Description ==
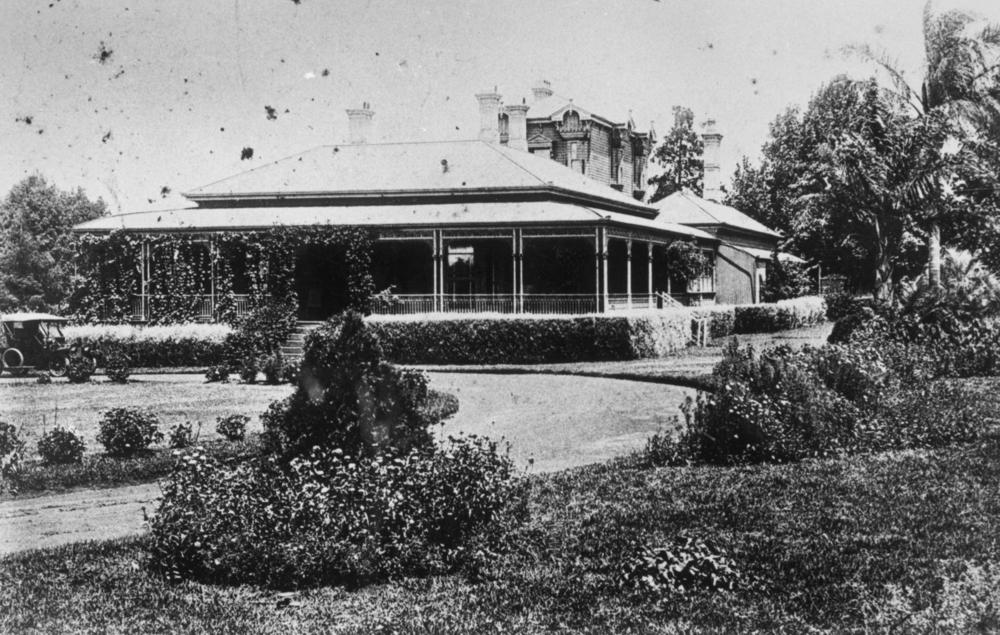
Ascot House, circa 1876

Ascot House is a single-storey timber residence with an attached two-storey timber extension, referred to as a folly. The house has a verandah around three sides under a separate roof, supported by slender double columns with decorative cast-iron capitals. Parts of the verandah have been enclosed.

The original section of the house is a simple U-shaped plan with verandahs extending beyond the length of the house. The folly stands within the central space created by the plan of the house, protected on each side by the enclosed verandahs and has external access at the rear of the house. Internal access to the folly is gained from the end of the large central hallway in the old house.

The folly is of a unique design with an intricately modelled facade of eclectic styles. The external timber features are reminiscent of neo-classical, neo-gothic and Dutch design. The folly is a tall narrow structure with layers of pediments, window and door frames, trimmings and brackets giving the facade a textured appearance.

The top of the facade is marked by two flying gables with triangular pediments and semi-circular valances with a central finial. The gables are supported by decorative timber brackets and they frame vertical timber panelling on the face of the building. The gables surmount small, elongated oriel windows with narrow rectangular glass panels. In the centre of the facade is a neo-classical triangular pediment which surmounts a Dutch-style pediment with a decorative timber "heart" motif in the centre. On ground level, a protruding set of doors framed in Gothic style arches are protected by a double awning, the top layer convex and the bottom layer concave. The two awnings are separated by a large fascia board decorated by rectangular panels.

The house is set on a large piece of land extending from the western side of the house towards Tor Street. The grounds contain mature trees, walking paths and fish ponds. A large palm on the north-west corner of the house is an original planting.

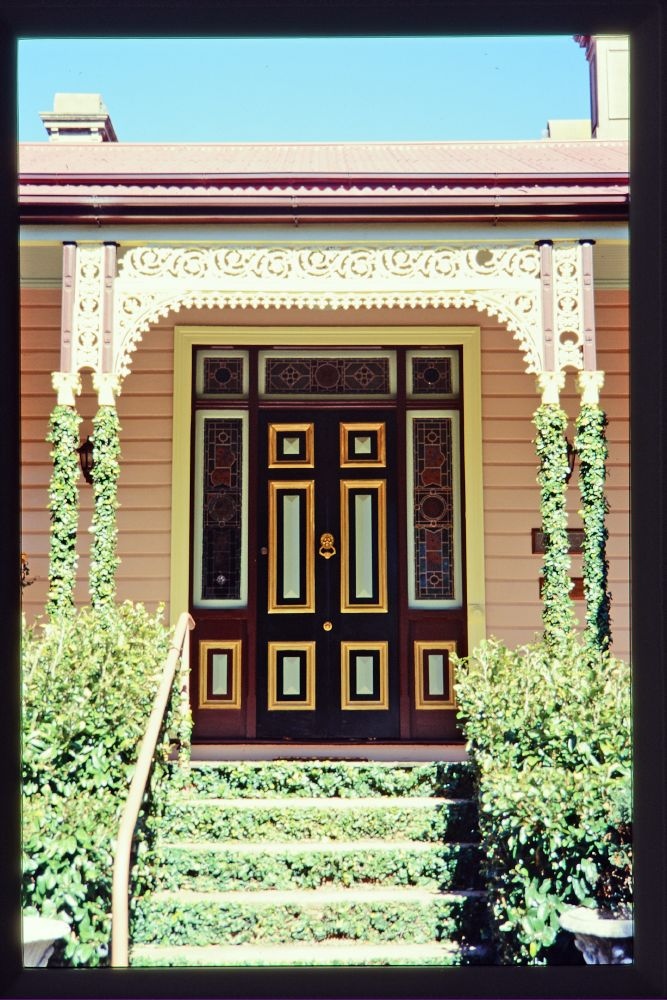
Front door

The front door to the house is surmounted by a fanlight with coloured glass and displays the initials "WB" in the central panel (WB stands for William Beit, a previous owner and builder of the folly). The front door is flanked on either side by large step-down bay windows which are repeated along the sides of the verandahs.

The floors are carpeted internally except for the front living room and the dining room where the timber boards are exposed and polished and a decorative border design has been painted on the floor. The front door accesses a long and wide hallway which leads off to bedrooms and formal rooms. At the end of the hall the ballroom of the folly extends perpendicular to the hall. It is a large room with timber vaulted ceiling. The original decorative painted stencils are still visible on the ballroom ceiling. On the eastern side of the ballroom is a guest bedroom built in an enclosed section of the original verandah. On the western side is the kitchen also in an enclosed part of the verandah. Directly behind the ballroom is the former billiard room, now a public tea room, which is oval-shaped and features heavily panelled ceilings including square panels on the top of the ceilings and gothic arches around the cornices. On the eastern side of the tea room is the former maids' quarters accessed by a small set of steps. This area originally featured three very small bedrooms built into the enclosed verandah. The area has now been opened into one space but still demonstrates timber VJs and joinery. On the western side of the tea room also accessed by some steps through a gothic arch way is the commercial kitchen situated in what was originally the scullery.

The second storey of the folly rises only above the former billiard room area and is accessed by a curved timber stairway from the ballroom. This upper level contains two bedrooms with fireplaces and views to the surrounding area from the oriel windows.

== Heritage listing ==
Ascot House was listed on the Queensland Heritage Register on 21 October 1992 having satisfied the following criteria.

The place is important in demonstrating the evolution or pattern of Queensland's history.

Ascot House is significant as one of the largest and most elaborate of all the grand residences of Toowoomba. Ascot follows the pattern of the construction of substantial houses on the Downs, demonstrating the development of the Darling Downs from a sparsely populated pastoral region to one of prosperity.

Ascot House is significant for its association with American troops stationed at the house in World War Two.

The place demonstrates rare, uncommon or endangered aspects of Queensland's cultural heritage.

Ascot House is also associated with the work of Harry Marks, who designed the 1890s folly, probably the most recognised architectural feature of the house and significant for its rarity amongst such residences.

The place is important because of its aesthetic significance.

As one of the largest and most extensive of the grand Toowoomba residences, Ascot House high aesthetic value. The ornate decoration of the folly contributes significantly to this aesthetic value.

The place has a special association with the life or work of a particular person, group or organisation of importance in Queensland's history.

Ascot House is significant for its association with prominent Toowoomba architect William Hodgen, who designed 1899 alterations to the stable and kitchen. Ascot House is associated with Frederick Holberton and William Beit Jnr, son of William Beit Snr, the Westbrook squatter.

Ascot House is also associated with the work of Harry Marks, who designed the 1890s folly, probably the most recognised architectural feature of the house and significant for its rarity amongst such residences.
