= Harlaxton House =

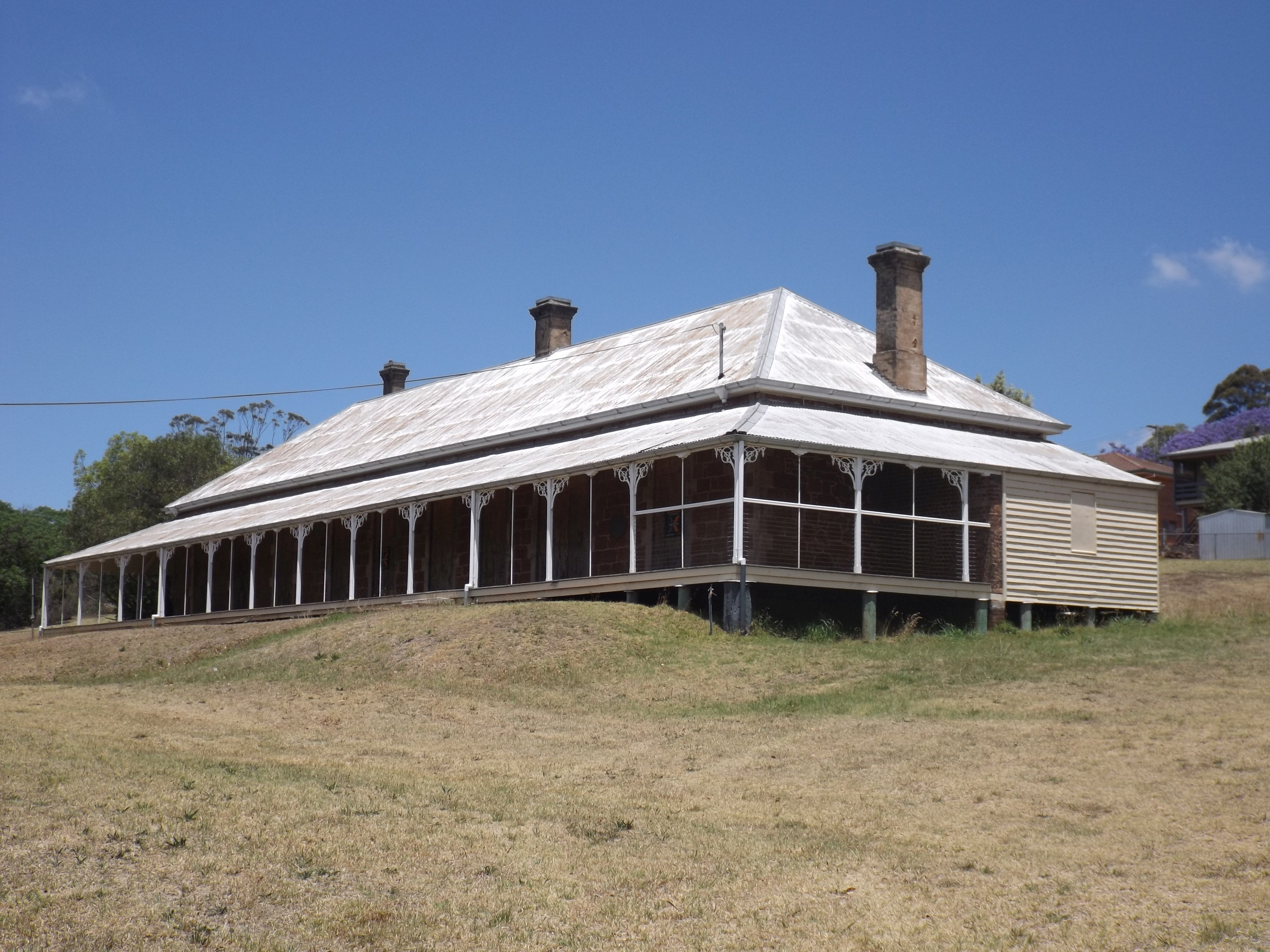
- 2014

- Location within Queensland Location within Australia
- 27.5299°S 151.96°E
- Location: 6 Munro Street, Harlaxton, Queensland, Australia

History
- Design period: 1840s–1860s (mid-19th century)
- Built: 1869–1870 – 1910s circa

Queensland Heritage Register
- Official name: Harlaxton House
- Type: state heritage (built, landscape)
- Designated: 21 October 1992
- Reference no.: 600839
- Significant period: 1860s–1910s (fabric, historical)
- Significant components: service wing, attic, views from, residential accommodation – main house, views to, carriage way/drive, trees/plantings, terracing

Harlaxton House is a heritage-listed villa at 6 Munro Street, Harlaxton, Queensland, Australia. It was built from 1869 to 1870 to 1910s circa. It was added to the Queensland Heritage Register on 21 October 1992.

== History ==
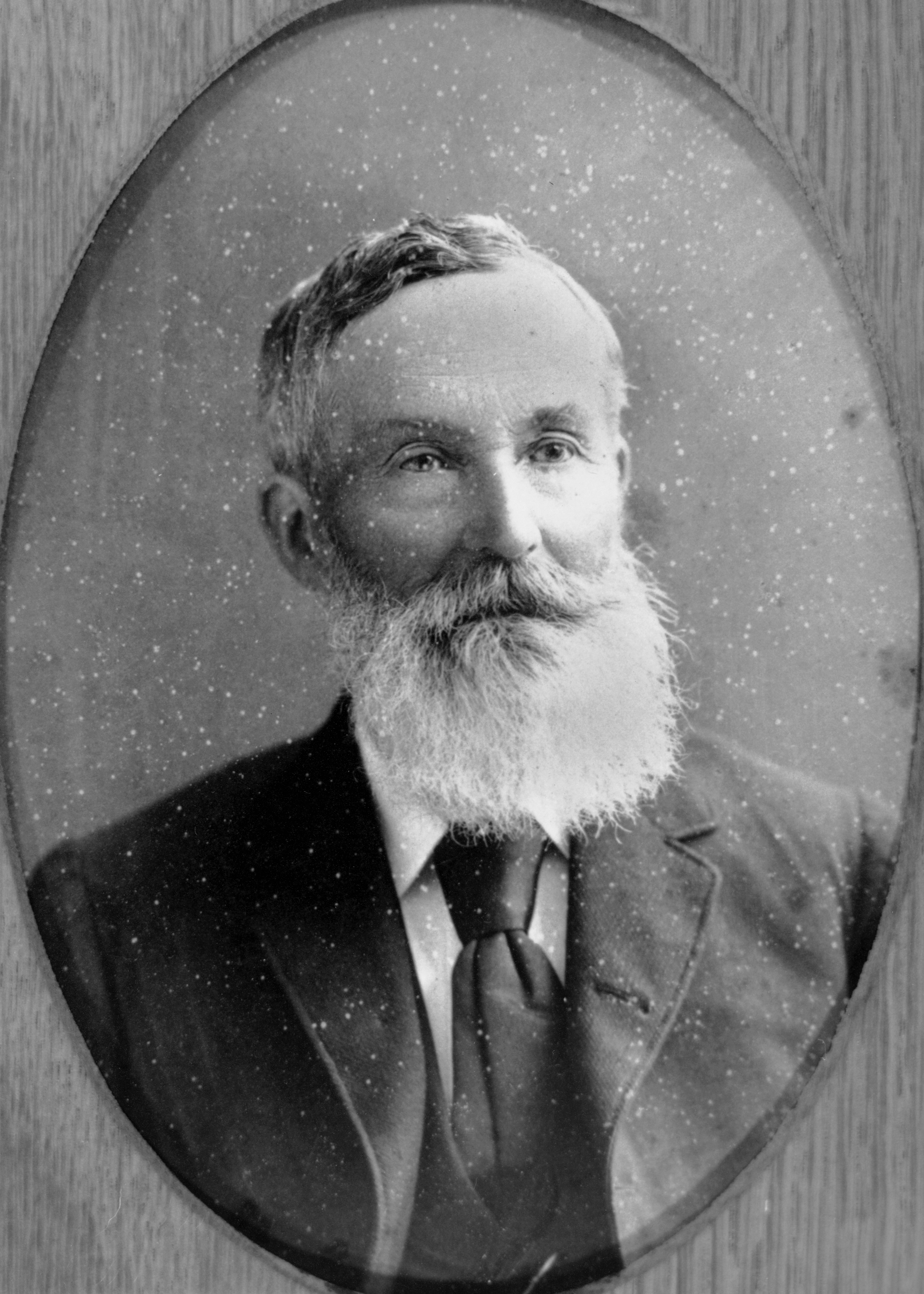
Francis Thomas Gregory (1821-1888)

Harlaxton House is a low-set, single-storey stone residence built for Francis Thomas Gregory, and his wife Marion Scott Gregory, née Hume, in the 1870s. A letter to the editor of the Toowoomba Chronicle dated 19 June 1979, suggests that Harlaxton House was named after Harlaxton Manor, relatively near the home of the Gregorys at Farnsfield, Nottinghamshire. The architect of Harlaxton House is unknown.

The date of completion of Harlaxton House is uncertain but in a letter written to Katie Hume, dated 23 November 1869, Mrs Gregory refers to "The Hermitage", presumably where she was writing, as being "within a mile of the house Frank Gregory is building on the Range and which they are to occupy next March". On 28 January 1871, Mrs Gregory had a son "at Harlaxton House near Toowoomba." Mrs Gregory was the sister of Walter Hume who later became the Commissioner of Crown Lands on the Darling Downs. (Walter Hume was the husband of Katie Hume, née Fowler, who is the subject of the publication Katie Hume on the Darling Downs: A Colonial Marriage, edited by Nancy Bonnin.)

On 7 August 1862, Martin Meldon took up 53 hectares (130 acres) of land extending back to where Downlands College now stands (On Deed of Grant information, land area is given as 43 acres (17 ha) and 3 roods (33,000 sq ft; 3,000 m^{2})). On 18 December 1869, it was purchased by Frances Thomas Gregory, later Hon. F.T. Gregory, M.L.C, gold medallist of the Royal Geographical Society, explorer, geologist and botanist. He was the son of Captain Joshua Gregory of the 78th Highlanders and brother of Sir Augustus Charles Gregory, first Surveyor-General of Queensland. Gregory was born on 19 October 1821, in Farnsfield, Nottinghamshire, and came to Australia in 1829 in the ship Loftus.

Gregory married Marion Scott Hume in 1864. The Register of the Queensland Parliament, 1860–1927 states that Gregory resigned as mining Commissioner for Stanthorpe in November 1872 to take over the administration on the Estate of his late friend William Beit, and the family moved to Westbrook. William Beit was the father of William Beit Jnr, the builder of Ascot House in Toowoomba. In 1874 Gregory entered the Queensland Legislative Council and the family moved back to Harlaxton. In 1874 Francis Thomas Gregory was listed in the Post Office Directory as a Justice of the Peace, Darling Downs. From information available in the Post Office Directory, 1883–84, Gregory is listed as Vice-President of Horticultural Association, Chairman of Highfields Divisional Board and Chairman and Treasurer of the Toowoomba Grammar School. Information in files of the National Trust of Queensland claim that, in 1877, Gregory was the financial agent for trustees of Beit (Westbrook) and Tooth (Clifton). He may still have been financial agent for trustees even though he may have moved back to Harlaxton. The exact dates of these occurrences remains unclear.

Harlaxton was originally known as Irishtown, as a number of Irish settlers stayed in the completing the new Main Line railway between Ipswich and Toowoomba. Railway line opened in Toowoomba on 1 May 1867, while the Brisbane link was not established until 14 June 1875.

Harlaxton House was rented by Lord Lamington, the eighth governor of Queensland (1896–1901). Harlaxton railway station (27.5289°S 151.9584°E) on the Main Line railway from Brisbane was established for the benefit of Governor Lamington, his guests and his staff. It is widely believed that the iconic Australian cake known as the Lamington was first created here. From 1906 to 1909, Gabbinbar was the summer residence of the Governor of Queensland, Lord Chelmsford and his family. The use of the residence as a summer retreat for the governor continued the trend of using several Toowoomba residences in this manner. Fernside was used as a place of summer residence by Sir Arthur Kennedy, Governor of Queensland from 1877 to 1883. Sir Arthur Kennedy, 5th Governor of Queensland, often visited Harlaxton. It is purported that Sir Arthur and Lady Kennedy were good friends with the Gregorys.

After the death of Gregory in Toowoomba on 23 October 1888, Harlaxton was sold to Anne and William Herbert Francis Perry in April 1891. The Perrys used the house as a summer residence. It was probably during the Perrys' residence that a sewerage system and hot and cold running water was installed. Mrs Perry died in 1911 and the house again was sold.

Information from Trustees Quarterly Review, April 1912 states that:

...A number of important property sales have taken place in Toowoomba during the last few months. One very important feature was the subdivision of the late Hon. W. Perry's Harlaxton Estate, comprising an area of about 150 acres within two miles (ca. 5 km) of the city. Under instructions from Queensland Trustees Limited, this property was subdivided into allotments ranging from a quarter to one acre, and at the two auction sales held, practically the whole of the property was disposed of at prices ranging from £43 to £220 per acre. Harlaxton was however, not sold and still remains open to a purchaser.

George and Dorothea Cook bought the property in 1914; however, according to Mrs Cook, the title deeds were held up due to World War I. The Cooks became the registered owners of Harlaxton House on 26 September 1916. The Cook's bought the property when Munro Street was named Herbert Street and what is now Prince Street was named George Street. Dorothea Cook died in 1982 and Harlaxton House has remained, for the most part, unoccupied since.

== Description ==
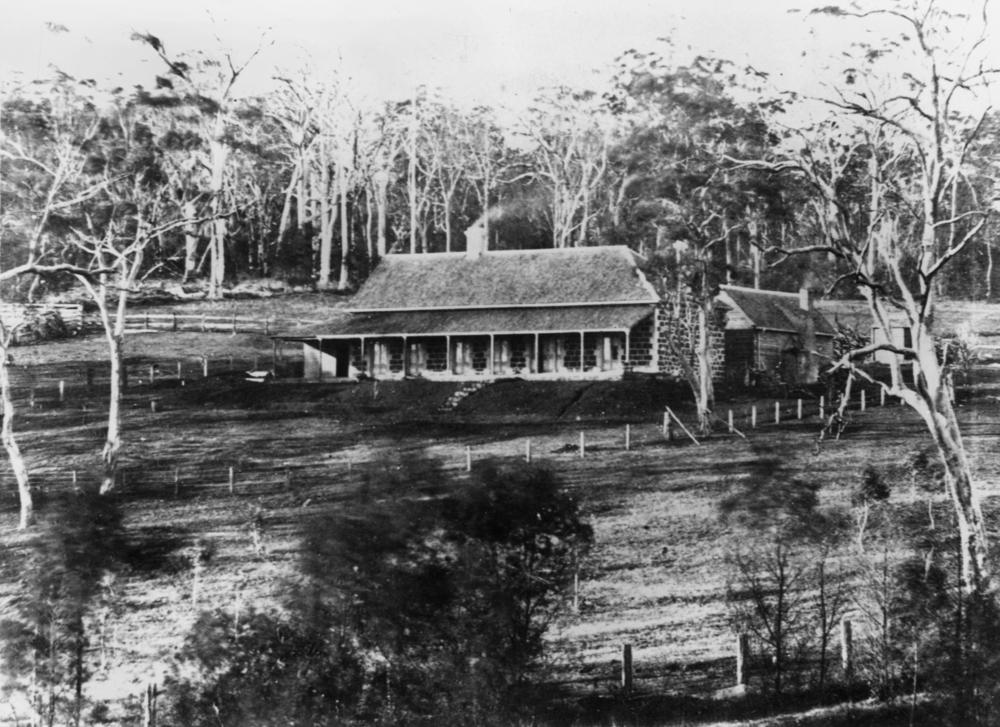
Harlaxton in Toowoomba, Queensland, ca. 1870

Harlaxton House is a low-set, single-storey stone residence built on a hill side with views overlooking the Toowoomba Range. It is a good example of the Victorian Georgian style of architecture popular from the 1840s to the 1890s. The style is noted for its gentle symmetry and simple rectangular shapes with conservative detailing. The residence was constructed from an unusual red stone quarried at Harlaxton which is known as "Laterite". The stone gets its strong dark red colouring and its unusual texture from the presence of iron-oxide and clay. The doors and windows are trimmed in Helidon sandstone.

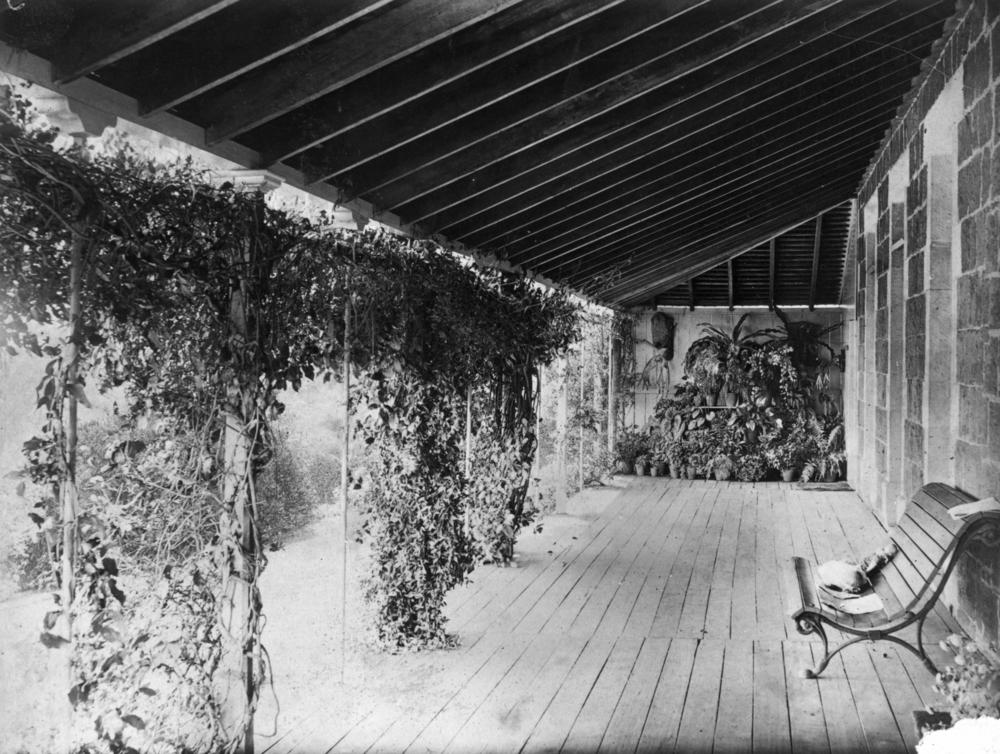
Verandah at Harlaxton, Toowoomba in the 1880s

The original section of the house is an L-shaped plan and is surrounded on two sides by a verandah with a separate roof, supported by slender timber posts with decorative cast iron brackets. The verandahs do not have any balustrades. The western side of the verandah has been enclosed in timber. Timber extensions have also occurred at the rear of the building. The hipped roof is of corrugated iron and is an elongated rectangle covering the front elevation. Two chimneys are visible, one on the south-east section and one on the north-west section. The shorter section of the roof which covers the foot of the "L" plan has a steep gable at the rear which houses an attic.

The interior of the original section of the house is intact with the original cedar joinery and room layout extant (with the exception of a superficial timber partition in one of the eastern rooms). The main entrance to the interior is via a timber door at the western end of the front verandah which leads to an entrance hall; however, panelled French doors line the front verandah gaining entrance to each of the formal rooms at the front of the house. There is also a side door on the easterly verandah.

The entrance hall is divided into two sections, one behind the other, and has doors in each section leading to other rooms. The interior is of a simple design with two large central rooms connected by doorways at the rear, both having two sets of French doors leading to the front verandah. A short hall-way on the eastern side of these rooms gains access to two more formal rooms at the front and two bedrooms at the rear and ultimately leads to the side door of the easterly verandah. There are four bedrooms, two in the north-west corner and two in the south-east corner of the house.

Each of the bedrooms has a fireplace and the two large central living rooms have a fireplace on either side of the dividing wall and there is one fireplace in the eastern formal room. The house has seven original fireplaces with mantles.

The external stone wall in the eastern formal room is exposed internally. Other walls are wallpapered or plastered. The interior walls display numerous cracks in the masonry. The largest cracks include one in the wall between the entrance hall and the adjacent formal room and one in the dividing wall between the bedrooms in the south-east corner. These cracks are quite substantial and are due to moving foundations.

The timber addition at the rear of the original house consists of two bedrooms, a kitchen, a bathroom with two external toilets, and a laundry. It has a hall which runs along the former external wall of the house. The red stone has been painted in this section.

The house is currently unused but basic maintenance has been carried out by the owners including new guttering, roof maintenance and drainage of the land to prevent any further damp problems.

Two corrugated iron sheds are on the property. One is in poor condition with a predominance of rust throughout; the other appears more recent and is in good condition. The exact construction dates of the sheds are unknown. A number of mature trees are extant to the rear of the house.

Remains of the carriage drive are still discernible. After entering the property via Munro Street, the drive loops around in front of the house on a wide terrace dug into the hill side. Part of the drive, on the Prince Street side, is no longer apparent due to the construction of a modern road. The steep slope in front of the house has another terrace below the driveway, reminiscent of former gardens, and the house is on flat land dug into the slope of the hill.

== Heritage listing ==
Harlaxton House was listed on the Queensland Heritage Register on 21 October 1992 having satisfied the following criteria.

The place is important in demonstrating the evolution or pattern of Queensland's history.

Harlaxton House follows the pattern of the construction of substantial houses on the Darling Downs which came to be used as summer resorts by various Governors, demonstrating the development of the Darling Downs from a sparsely populated pastoral region to one of prosperity.

The proximity of Harlaxton House to the Railway Quarry, and the railway line which winds around the ranges to the north-east, reflects the importance of the development of the railway and its effect on the town

The place is important in demonstrating the principal characteristics of a particular class of cultural places.

Harlaxton House is significant as an elegant example of well-to-do domestic building from the 1870s, reflecting the wealth and status of a prominent figure in Toowoomba, a major regional centre in colonial Queensland.

The location of Harlaxton House demonstrates the importance of topography for early settlers when they were choosing a suitable site on which to build.

The place is important because of its aesthetic significance.

Harlaxton House is aesthetically significant due to its location and its well balanced design and verandahs which take advantage of the views of the Toowoomba Range.

The place has a strong or special association with a particular community or cultural group for social, cultural or spiritual reasons.

Harlaxton House has special association with the community of Toowoomba as a well-known early residence and summer resort of the Governors of Queensland, including Lord Lamington, the eighth governor of Queensland, who rented Harlaxton House.

The place has a special association with the life or work of a particular person, group or organisation of importance in Queensland's history.

Harlaxton House has special association with the community of Toowoomba as a well-known early residence and summer resort of the Governors of Queensland, including Lord Lamington, the eighth governor of Queensland, who rented Harlaxton House.
