= St James Anglican Church, Toowoomba =

St James Church, Toowoomba
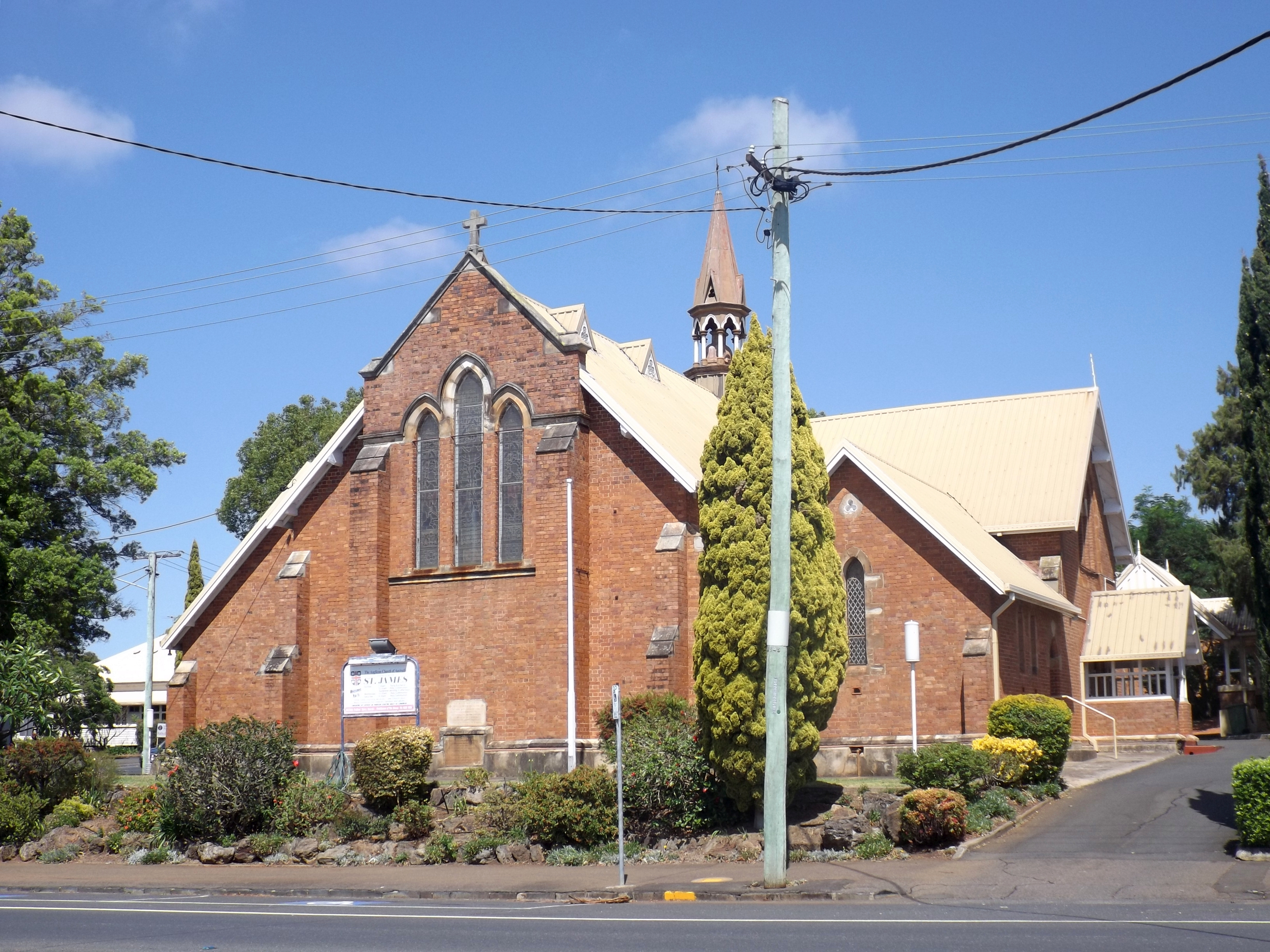
- Viewed from Mort Street, 2014

- Location within Queensland Location within Australia
- 27.5579°S 151.9488°E
- Location: 145 Mort Street, Toowoomba, Queensland, Australia

History
- Design period: 1840s–1860s (mid-19th century)
- Built: 1869–1953

Site notes
- Architect: Richard George Suter
- Architectural style: Gothic

Queensland Heritage Register
- Official name: St James Church, St James Church of England
- Type: state heritage (built, landscape)
- Designated: 28 July 2000
- Reference no.: 601298
- Significant period: 1860s (historical); 1860s, 1880s, 1900s, 1950s (fabric) ongoing (social)
- Significant components: trees/plantings, church, views to, furniture/fittings, steeple, stained glass window/s, garden/grounds, tower – bell / belfry

St James Church is a heritage-listed Anglican church at the corner of Mort Street and Russell Street, Toowoomba, Queensland, Australia. It was designed by Richard George Suter and built in 1869. The church has subsequently undergone several expansions, largely from 1882 to 1953, and necessary repairs/rebuilds. It is also known as St James Church of England. It was added to the Queensland Heritage Register on 28 July 2000.

== History ==
St James Church of England was constructed in 1869 to the design of prominent Brisbane architect, Richard George Suter. The building which has a number of additions, was constructed as the second Church of England in Toowoomba.

The first Church of England was established on the site of the present St Luke's Anglican Church, at the corner of Herries and Ruthven Streets. St Luke's Church was established on this site in a small timber building in 1857, but it was not long with Toowoomba rapid growth that this small rudimentary structure was considered too small for the growing community. There was much debate about the location of a more permanent structure, some of the townsfolk and the Bishop felt that a brick building should replace the existing timber building on the same site, whereas other influential members of the community preferred to see the church re-located to a site near the Mort Estate where land was offered to the church by James Taylor MLA.

Designs for the new building were acquired, firstly from local architect Arthur Hartley in 1866 and then from Brisbane architect Richard George Suter in 1868. At a meeting of the Church Parish in September 1868 the Suter plans and specifications of the new church were approved and yet there was still no agreement on the site of the new building. It was only after the Bishop in February 1869 changed his mind on the matter that the site near the Mort Estate was finally chosen. The bishop felt that there was larger population here, although he acknowledged that the site would be less convenient for some of the parish.

At a meeting of April 1869 the tender of local contractor, Richard Godsall for the construction of the building for £1400 was accepted and construction began. Suter's design of the church was in keeping with the design of small parish churches in England of the time – modestly sized Gothic Revival buildings with steeply pitched roofs, small ornate roof towers, well executed brickwork and pointed arched openings throughout. The polychrome striped brickwork of the original St James Church is particularly interesting and unusual in the Queensland context. The church is similar in proportion and massing to other Church of England buildings designed by Suter including St Mark's in Warwick (1867–1870). Suter was a strong supporter and warden in the Church of England and was a popular choice of architect for many of the Church's buildings from the mid-1860s until the mid-1870s.

The land on which St James Church was built at the corner of Mort and Russell Streets, was acquired by James Taylor, a prominent churchman, on 19 January 1865 from William Horton. The land was formally acquired by the Corporation of the Synod of the Diocese of Brisbane on 8 February 1884 and trustees were later appointed. The foundation stone of the church was laid by the Governor of Queensland, Samuel Wensley Blackall on 1 May 1869. The church was opened on Thursday 23 December 1869 by the Bishop of Brisbane, Edward Tufnell. The opening of the church was reported in the Toowoomba Chronicle where the building was described as comprising an apsidal chancel, nave and transepts to the north and south, with bluestone foundation and freestone dressings. The transept and chancel roofs were set at a lower height than the nave roof with a spire at the crossing. The north and south transepts had small open timber porches.

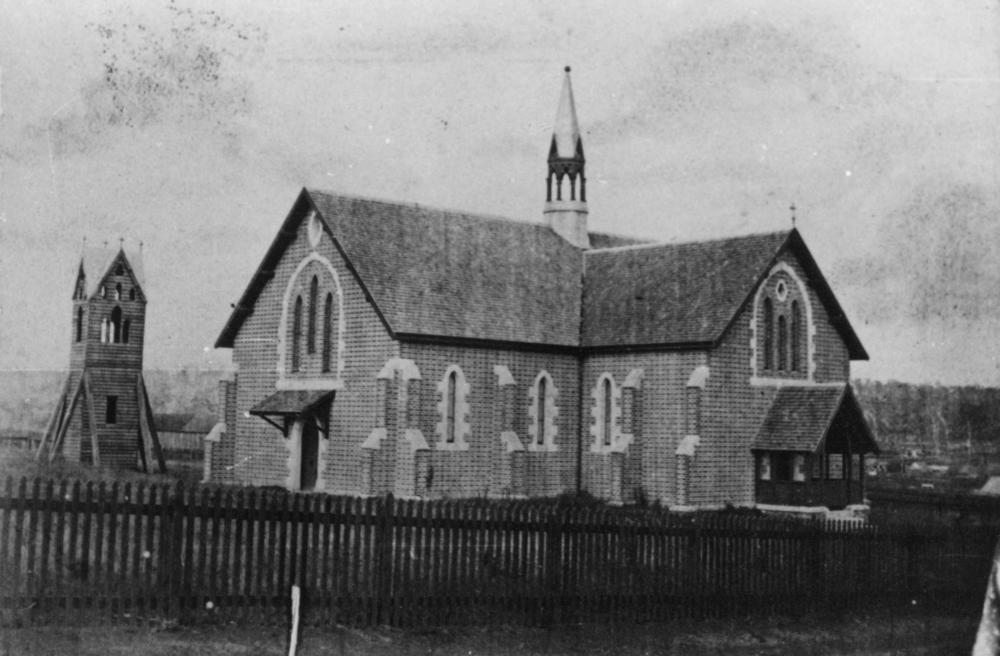
St James, 1869

The construction of this new building was thought by many, including the Bishop to have replaced the earlier St Lukes. However the building was named St James, after St James the Less, not St Lukes indicating a separate entity rather than a continuing tradition. In fact, those parishioners unhappy about the relocation of the site argued strongly for the retention of the early St Luke's site where services continued to be held in what was now regarded as a school room. Suffice to say, this debate raged for about 30 years and in the early 20th century, St Lukes and St James became separate parishes north and south of the Margaret Street dividing line.

By 1876, St James was considered inadequate and cracks appeared in the apsidal chancel at the eastern end of the building facing Mort Street. However money was restricted by the effective funding of two separate churches and it was not until 1882 that work was commenced on major additions to the church designed by local architect James Marks. The original apsidal chancel was replaced by a larger face brick extension which presented a new gabled end to Mort Street with a tripartite lancet window on the face of the wall known as the Davenport window. As well the nave was extended by two bays. During the 1880s an oak reredos (carved screen behind altar), altar rails and choir stalls were installed. Another major addition to the church was the installation in the northern nave windows of stained glass windows commissioned from English firm, Clayton and Bell and depicting the Nativity of Jesus and the Agony in the Garden. The slate roof of the building was replaced in the 1890s with rib and pan iron sheeting.

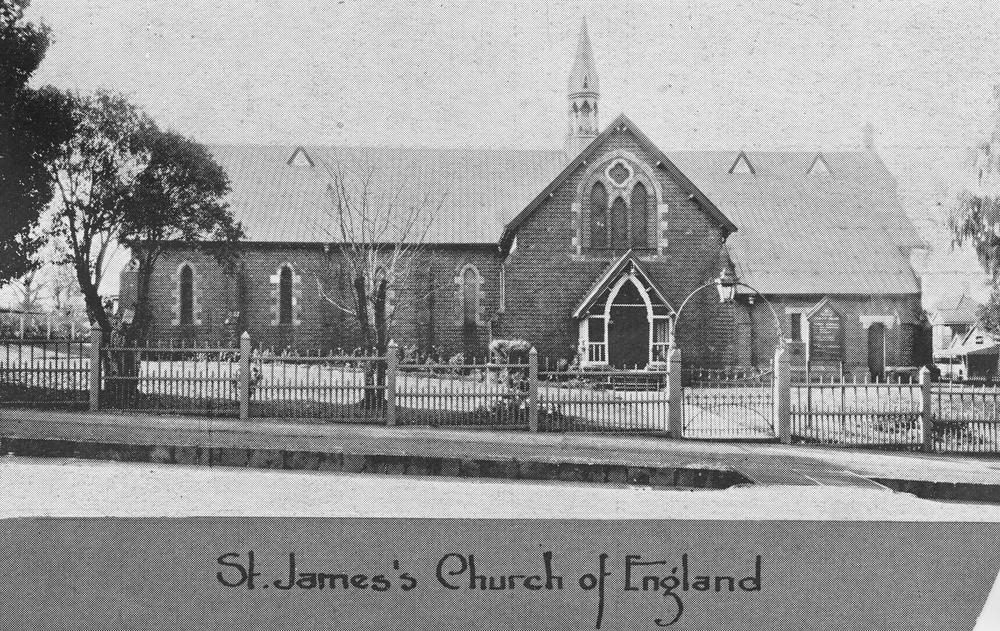
St James Church, 1932

As well as size restrictions, St James was faced with major structural problems and in 1904, the eastern wing of the building, facing Mort Street, was demolished. The chancel was rebuilt along with the northern transept and adjoining vestry. This work was supervised by Brisbane architect John Smith Murdoch and finished at a cost of £1000.

In 1912, the St James Parish Hall was built on the other side of Russell Street. It is separately heritage-listed.

In 1953 the apsidal baptistery was demolished and rebuilt to the design of Toowoomba architect Charles B Marks.

More recent alterations have included the replacement of the southern porch with a brick gable roofed projection.

== Description ==
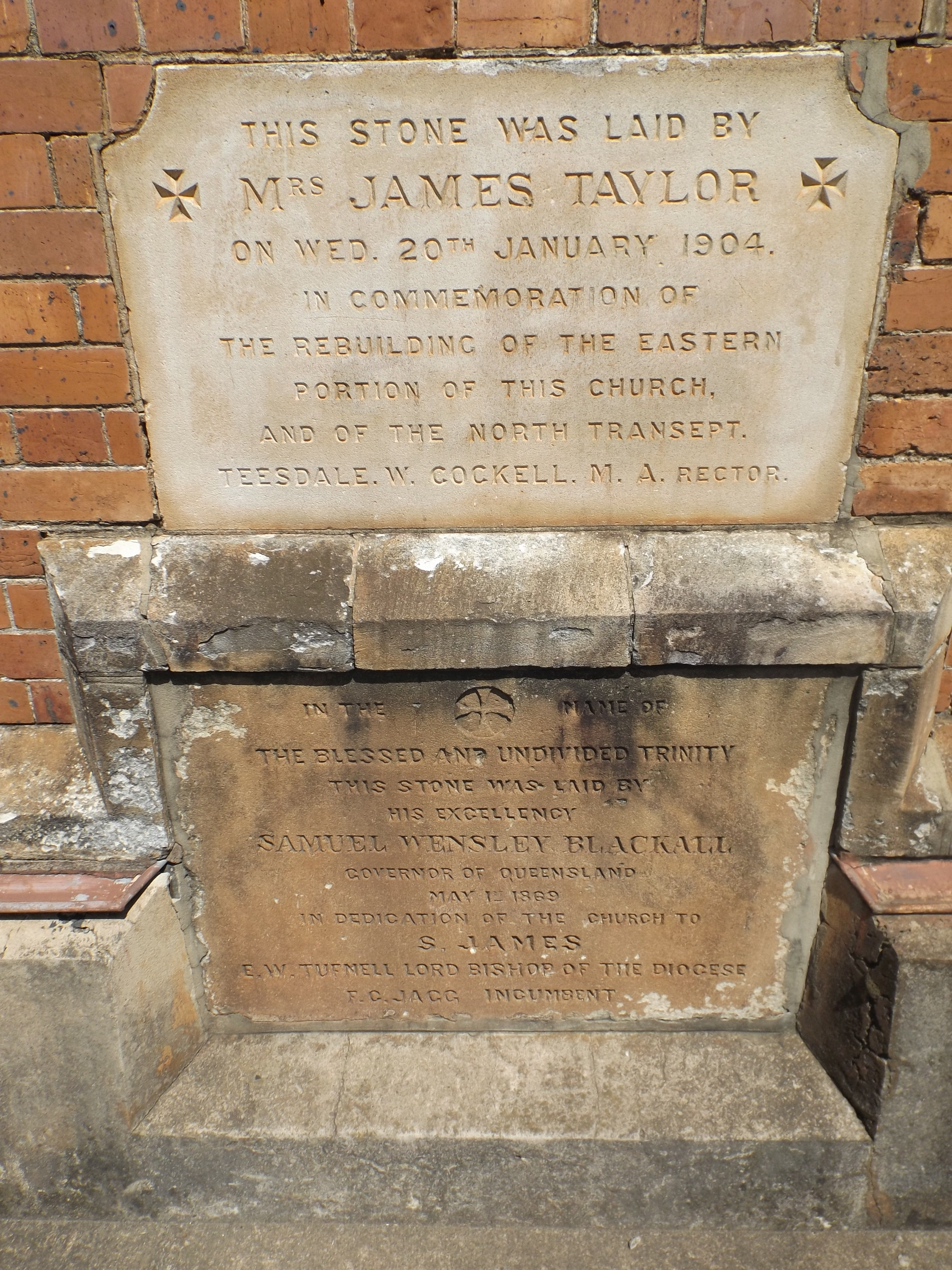
Foundation stone

St James Church is located on the corner of Russell and Mort Streets, Toowoomba. It is co-located with an adjacent c1990s-constructed brick Parish Centre, and a c1960s brick and tile rectory, which replaced an earlier wooden rectory. A timber-framed bell tower, the second on that site, sits towards the north-western end of the church, near the Parish Centre. There is a modern wooden gazebo sited in the garden near Russell Street. Lush gardens, including mature trees and palms, surround the church.

St James is a modestly scaled building, reflecting the importance of early English gothic revival architecture in parish churches during the second half of the 19th century. The characteristic elements of that style are seen in the steeply pitched roof with timber framed steeple, polychrome brickwork, stained glass windows in pointed arched openings and, internally, use of hammer beam roof trusses and dark stained timber furniture including pews, reredos and other altar furniture.

Because the church has been altered a number of times with extensions and replacement, the brickwork and detail is not consistent externally. The earliest part of the building is distinguished by the polychrome brickwork and sandstone detailing. Subsequent extensions have been constructed in monochrome brick.

The church has a cruciform plan, the nave running east–west, with the eastern, altar end facing Mort Street. The nave has a gabled roof clad with Zincalume (or equivalent). The transepts from the northern and southern faces of the church also have gabled roofs, slightly lower in height than the principal nave roof. The point at which the roofs of the nave and transepts cross is punctuated with a small timber framed steeple. The steeple has an open decorative timber body supported on a timber base structure and capped with an elongated pyramidal metal roof with small openings.

The eastern end of the building, facing Mort Street, is one of the areas which has been largely rebuilt. The chancel is a square planned and with centrally located tripartite window openings. The external face of this facade has brick buttresses flanking the window opening and another pair of buttresses supporting the corners. Flanking the eastern end of the building are smaller gabled roof extensions housing vestries.

The northern and southern transepts of the building form the principal entrances to the church, through centrally located porches. The northern porch is open, with a brick base and timber battened balustrade and arched opening around the entrance. Above the porch is a tripartite window opening with brick surrounds. The porch on the southern transept has been replaced with a closed vestibule from the c. 1970s. This differs from the original porch in size and roof pitch. Lining the nave of the building are small lancet window openings, separated by brick buttressing.

The western face of the building features a small gabled roof projection which is later than the actual face of this facade. Above the projection is a tripartite window opening.

The interior of the church is a single volume with white painted rendered walls. The ceiling space is divided into the bays of the nave with stained timber hammer beam roof trusses. The ceiling is lined with diagonally timber boarding.

A feature of the interior is fine timber screens and rails associated with the altar. Stained glass windows line the nave and western end of the building. Early timber pews lined are organised into two sections with central aisle.

== Heritage listing ==
St James Church was listed on the Queensland Heritage Register on 28 July 2000 having satisfied the following criteria.

The place is important in demonstrating the evolution or pattern of Queensland's history.

St James Anglican Church, an early surviving 1860s church, demonstrates the growth of the Church of England in south east Queensland.

The place demonstrates rare, uncommon or endangered aspects of Queensland's cultural heritage.

The original part of the Church is an uncommon example of a Gothic Revival building using polychrome brickwork, a common feature of equivalent English and churches of the southern states but rarely used in Queensland.

The place is important in demonstrating the principal characteristics of a particular class of cultural places.

It is a fine example of early English gothic revival architecture at the scale of a small parish church.

The place is important because of its aesthetic significance.

St James is a good example of the work of prominent early architect, Richard Suter and is a fine example of early English gothic revival architecture at the scale of a small parish church. The original part of the Church is an uncommon example of a Gothic Revival building using polychrome brickwork, a common feature of equivalent English and churches of the southern states but rarely used in Queensland.

The place has a strong or special association with a particular community or cultural group for social, cultural or spiritual reasons.

The place has social and spiritual significance as a place of worship for 130 years.
