= St James Parish Hall, Toowoomba =

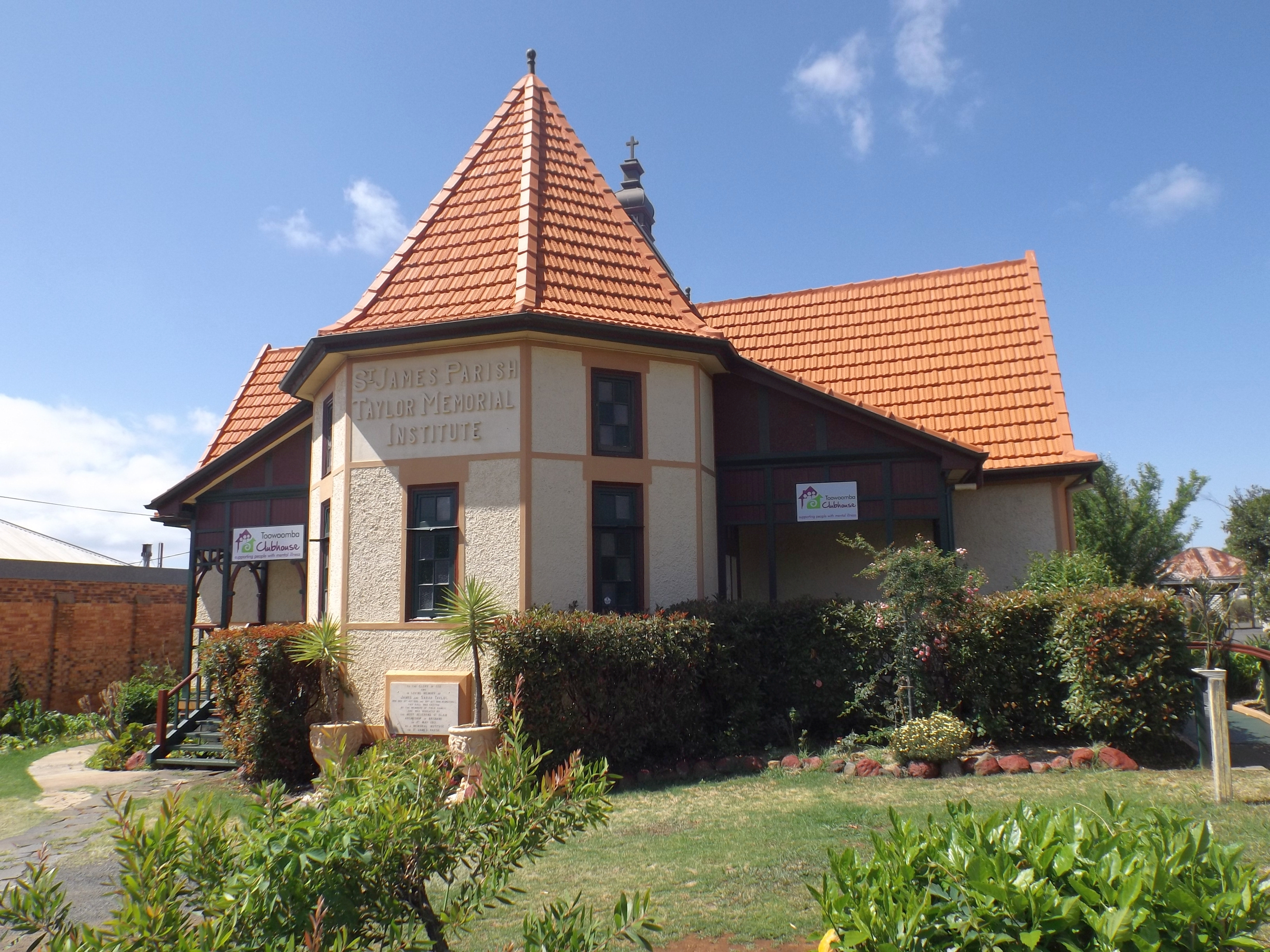
- Front of building, 2014

- Location within Queensland Location within Australia
- 27.5586°S 151.9489°E
- Location: 112 Russell Street, Toowoomba, Queensland, Australia

History
- Design period: 1900–1914 (early 20th century)
- Built: 1912

Site notes
- Architect: Henry James (Harry) Marks
- Architectural style: Arts & Crafts

Queensland Heritage Register
- Official name: St James Parish Hall, Taylor Memorial Institute
- Type: state heritage (built)
- Designated: 28 March 1995
- Reference no.: 600856
- Significant period: 1910s (historical); 1910s (fabric) ongoing (social)
- Significant components: fence/wall – perimeter, church hall/sunday school hall, turret/s, views to

St James Parish Hall is a heritage-listed church hall at 112 Russell Street, Toowoomba, Queensland, Australia. It was designed by Henry James (Harry) Marks and built in 1912. It is also known as Taylor Memorial Institute. It was added to the Queensland Heritage Register on 28 March 1995.

== History ==
St James' Parish Hall was built in 1912 opposite St James Anglican Church (c. 1868) in Russell Street. James Taylor donated the land and erected the Hall designed by architect Harry J. Marks, to stand as a memorial to his parents, the Hon. James Taylor and his wife Sarah. The Hon. James Taylor had given the land for St James' Church as a gift to the Parish some forty-five years earlier, and is credited with taking a leading role in the early development of Toowoomba.

The hall features Marks' unusual construction methods and details, including his patented "hollow wall" construction to give the appearance of a solid wall whilst being cheaper to construct than brickwork. Another interesting feature of the building developed and used by Marks is the extendable casement window which provides optimum directional ventilation. Only three of these windows remain in working order.

The hall was opened on 1 May 1912 by Archbishop of Brisbane St Clair Donaldson. The Hall was described as "a model of architecture" with ample facilities for the uses it was to be put to, including reading rooms and library, a lounge, and as a venue for Sunday school and meetings.

The Hall was repainted and minor repairs were undertaken in 1923–24, mostly to remedy damage from water penetration under the roof.

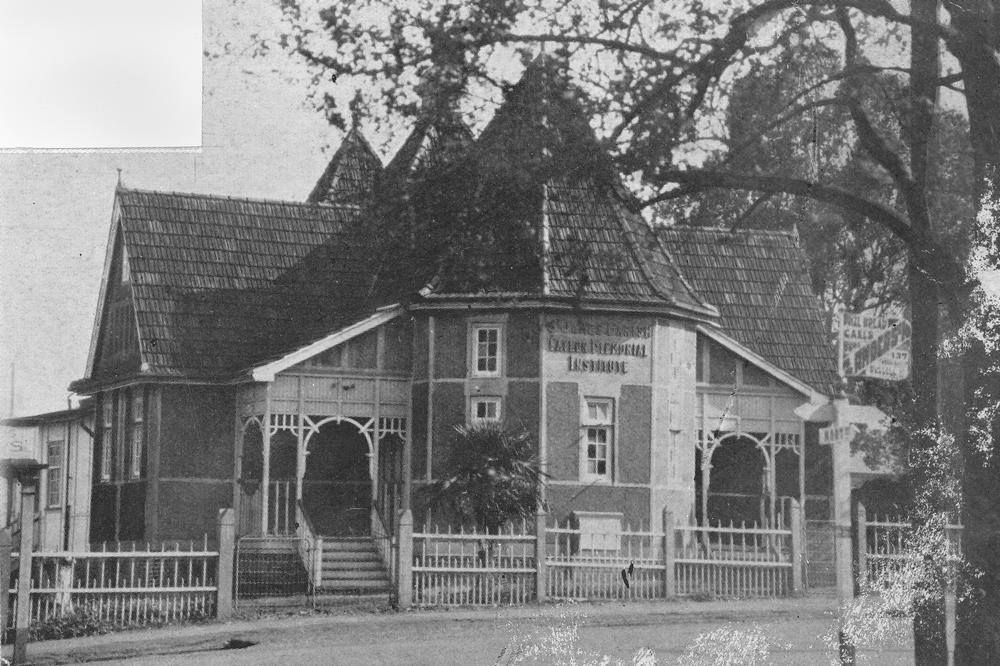
Taylor Memorial Institute, 1932

The brick fence at the front of the hall is thought to have been designed (c. 1940) by Charles Beresford Marks (Harry Marks' son), and bears a small plaque in memory of James Taylor as benefactor and foundation member of St James' Parish.

The building was substantially extended to the rear to form a large kitchen area c. 1950. Work was undertaken in 1991 to repair water damage to the roof and ceiling of the Hall.

== Description ==
St James' Parish Hall, fronting Russell Street to the north, is located opposite St James Church. The site is bounded on either side by single-storeyed buildings; a brick store built to the boundary on the east and a timber building and bitumen driveway to the west, with Baty Lane to the south. A single-storeyed timber and iron cottage is located to the southeast and a toilet block is located to the southwest. (The cottage and toilet block do not form part of the Entry in the Heritage Register.)

The building exhibits a strong arts and crafts influence in its design, with its picturesque terracotta tiled roof and prominent eaves, rough cast exterior, heavy base and stylised signage on the north wall.

The single-storeyed building has a brick base and utilises a "hollow wall" construction system, consisting of a metal frame lined with chicken wire and a stucco render; a smooth finish trim with rough infill externally and smooth finish internally. A marble memorial plaque is located to the base of the north wall.

The building has a fanciful steep pitch terracotta tiled roof with sprocketted eaves and projecting gables to the east and west. Three turrets, to the centre, and the north and south bays, have been formed by the ridge being deleted between them and a curved capping piece inserted. The centre turret has a "pot bellied", sheet metal roof ventilator, the other two have rounded finials.

The building has "extendable casement" windows, only three of which are still intact with the remainder having been modified into standard casements. These consist of a metal track above and below the centre of the window, perpendicular to the wall, on which the window slides away from the opening and can pivot at 360° for optimum ventilation. The windows in the hall have fanlight and sidelights, and in the end bays have hopper windows above, all of which have green and obscure glass panes.

The northeast porch has decorative timber arched brackets and balustrade. These have been removed from the northwest porch, which has a ramp for disabled access. Double timber doors with fanlights open into the hall.

A shallow corrugated iron gable roofed kitchen and store, which has been added to the south of the building, has fibrous cement cladding with timber cover strips, large sash windows with green and obscure glass panes, timber and iron window hoods to the south and brick stumps.

Internally, the building has a raised timber stage to the south bay, and a central hall with side aisles from which the kitchen and store is accessed. The building has rendered walls, timber posts with decorative brackets and arches, exposed trusses and boarded timber ceilings. Diagonal boarding is a decorative feature used throughout the building, including the ceiling, panels in doors and partition walls.

The kitchen and store have metal trusses, a fibrous cement sheet ceiling with timber cover strips and tongue and groove walls. A section of timber floor following the line of the stage bay, and abutting the kitchen and store floor, is visible. A section of folding partition wall with a metal roller divides the store area and in its detailing appears to be originally from the hall.

A brick fence with a central gateway is built along the Russell Street boundary, and features piers with crucifix shaped concrete trim.

Status of 1950 Extension: The rear kitchen extension (c. 1950) does not contribute to the cultural heritage significance of St James Parish Hall (1912). It does not contribute in scale, form or materials to the Russell Street streetscape or the Toowoomba townscape. The extension is unremarkable in terms of quality or craftsmanship and is unlikely to be valued by the community. The rear extension is included on the Register only for the purpose of ensuring that its future demolition or renovation would result in an appropriate treatment of the rear wall of the original hall building, or that any building which replaces it, is sympathetic to the hall proper.

== Heritage listing ==
St James Parish Hall was listed on the Queensland Heritage Register on 28 March 1995 having satisfied the following criteria.

The place is important in demonstrating the evolution or pattern of Queensland's history.

St James Parish Hall, erected 1912, is significant historically for its association with St James Church and the development of the Anglican Church in Toowoomba.

The place is important in demonstrating the principal characteristics of a particular class of cultural places.

It is a picturesque example of an Arts and Crafts inspired church hall in Toowoomba, and exhibits a range of aesthetic characteristics valued by the Toowoomba community and congregation of St James church, in particular the contribution of the building in its design, scale, form and materials to the streetscape of Russell Street and to the Toowoomba townscape; and the quality of, and craftsmanship displayed by, the interior, including the timber joinery.

The place is important because of its aesthetic significance.

It is a picturesque example of an Arts and Crafts inspired church hall in Toowoomba, and exhibits a range of aesthetic characteristics valued by the Toowoomba community and congregation of St James church, in particular the contribution of the building in its design, scale, form and materials to the streetscape of Russell Street and to the Toowoomba townscape; and the quality of, and craftsmanship displayed by, the interior, including the timber joinery.

The place is important in demonstrating a high degree of creative or technical achievement at a particular period.

The use of the "hollow wall" construction technique, the extendable casement window and pot-bellied roof ventilator, as patented designs, are important in demonstrating a high degree of technical achievement by the architect, Harry J Marks, in the early 20th century.

The place has a strong or special association with a particular community or cultural group for social, cultural or spiritual reasons.

As the parish hall for St James Church, one the oldest churches in Toowoomba, it has a special association with the Toowoomba community for social and cultural reasons.

The place has a special association with the life or work of a particular person, group or organisation of importance in Queensland's history.

It has special association with the life of the Hon. James Taylor, who played a prominent role in the early development of Toowoomba, and his family; and with the work of Toowoomba architects Harry J Marks and Charles Beresford Marks, who were responsible for the design of many Toowoomba buildings.
