= Gowrie House =

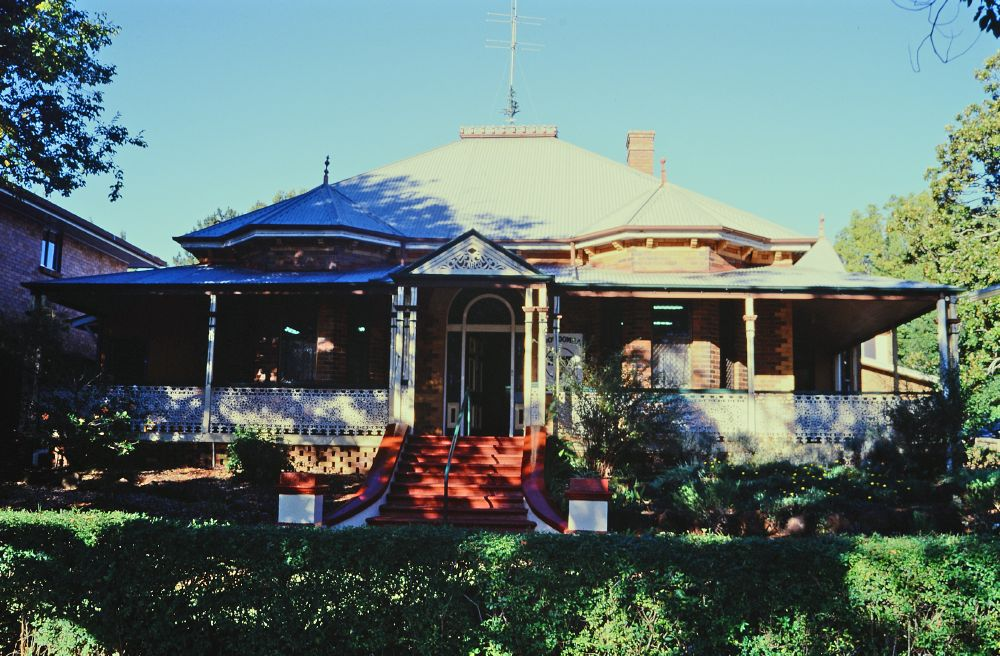
- Gowrie House, 2000

- Location within Queensland
- Interactive map of Gowrie House
- 27°33′35″S 151°58′01″E
- Location: 112 Mary Street, East Toowoomba, Toowoomba Region, Queensland, Australia

History
- Design period: 1900–1914 (early 20th century)
- Built: c. 1901

Site notes
- Architect: Henry James (Harry) Marks

Queensland Heritage Register
- Official name: Gowrie House, Largo
- Type: state heritage (landscape, built)
- Designated: 25 August 2000
- Reference no.: 601307
- Significant period: 1900s, 1930s, 1940s (fabric); 1945– (social)
- Significant components: kitchen/kitchen house, trees/plantings, steps/stairway, stained glass window/s, residential accommodation – main house

Gowrie House is a heritage-listed villa at 112 Mary Street, East Toowoomba in the Toowoomba Region of Queensland, Australia. It was designed by architect Henry James (Harry) Marks and built c. 1901. It is also known as Largo. It was added to the Queensland Heritage Register on 25 August 2000.

== History ==
The low-set brick house, Largo, on the corner of Arthur and Mary Street was designed by Harry Marks for prominent Toowoomba businessman Alexander Mayes and built in 1901 or 1902.

Architect Harry Marks was born and trained in Toowoomba and he and his father James Marks have been described by the Toowoomba Regional Council as dominating the architectural profession in Toowoomba for more than half a century. While Harry Marks designed a number of buildings on the Darling Downs and in Brisbane, most of his work was in Toowoomba. His designs included Rodway, St James Parish Hall, St Luke's Church Hall and Gladstone House and Cottage. Marks was not only a good architect, he was an inventive one, and he patented some of his innovative solutions such as the Austral window.

Alexander Mayes born at Largo, Fifeshire, Scotland, in 1859 came out to Queensland and established himself as a Toowoomba builder and contractor in 1886. He worked on the Toowoomba City Hall, Toowoomba Post Office, Tooowoomba Masonic Hall, Commercial Bank, Toowoomba Technical College, Vacy Hall and many private homes. He was mayor of Toowoomba in 1896, 1903, and 1912, and was the first mayor of the enlarged city of Toowoomba in 1916–1917. He was also active in the community serving on the School of Arts and Technical College Committee, the East Toowoomba School Committee, he was a staunch Mason, and was honorary superintendent of the Toowoomba Fire Brigade for 42 years. He was also involved with the Austral Association.

Successful and prosperous, Alexander Mayes and his wife Helena Agnes, daughter of grazier William Grieve, had moved into their new architect designed home by 1902. This large masonry house reflected the status of the Mayes in Toowoomba's society. One of Mayes' sons described his boyhood home in The Toowoomba Chronicle of 4 July 1985. He remembered three large bedrooms, the drawing room and the dining room all opening off the central hallway. At the rear was a large room "furnished with three beds and two long tables end-to-end", while the kitchen, pantry and maid's quarters were at the rear. Sons Emeritus Professor Bruce Toowoomba Mayes, Dr Alexander Mayes (involved with founding of St Andrew's Hospital Brisbane), Rev Charles Mayes and Hector Mayes were all born in this house.

In 1922 Mayes retired to northern New South Wales and Walter Watts occupied the house until Dr Albert Furness acquired it in 1936 when he employed noted Toowoomba architect William Hodgen for alterations. Hodgen's specifications include changes to the garage and laundry, adding panelling in the dining room, installing electric light switches and polishing woodwork in the dining room, drawing room and master bedroom. Dr Furness sold it to the Young Women's Christian Association (YWCA) of Toowoomba in 1945.

The Young Women's Christian Association was founded in the 1850s in England to provide accommodation for women and girls. It soon spread to America and Europe, and is now an international organisation. The first Queensland branch was formed in Rockhampton in 1888 and Brisbane in 1890. A branch was established in Toowoomba in 1932 due to the initiatives of Lady Groom, wife of the local Member of the Australian House of Representatives, Littleton Groom. During World War II the Toowoomba YWCA offered leave accommodation to servicewomen. The need for their own large premises saw the 1945 president and South Girls School headmistress, Miss Aileen Myfanwy Wadley, with a deposit of £50, able to acquire a loan to purchase Largo for the YWCA. Renamed Gowrie House after Lady Gowrie, the wife of the Australian Governor General Alexander Hore-Ruthven, 1st Earl of Gowrie, the site became the Toowoomba Young Women's Christian Association hostel. Mayor JD Annand officially opened it on 10 November 1945 as a hostel for young working and service girls.

The Toowoomba Chronicle of 12 November 1945 described the new hostel, saying how it was ideally situated on an acre of ground with mature shady trees and turf lawn and "should provide a happy atmosphere for many students and Service girls away from home". The solid brick house had a central hall off which were four spacious rooms with fireplaces and large windows and doors which opened onto wide verandahs. These large rooms with cedar-framed windows, doors and mantle pieces had been converted into dormitories sleeping four to six girls. The veranda on the northern side had also been converted into a dormitory. Just off this sleepout was "the bathroom with gas heater, set-in basin, bath and shower". Of three smaller rooms, one would be used for the matron and the others for dressing rooms. At the end of the hall was a huge cedar-panelled dining room with eight tables each seating six girls. Facing east it opened onto a fernery and side garden. The staff room, servery and well-equipped kitchen opened off the south side of the dining room.

An increase in country girls wanting secondary education and needing accommodation in Toowoomba resulted in construction of the Wadley Wing in the late 1950s. An increase in the accommodation needs of business and secondary students necessitated further expansion, with a new wing named after past president Margaret Hofmann opened by 1971 — it replaced a couple of army huts that had been used by senior girls.

With the Education Department's policy of building country high schools, the number of girls requiring accommodation in Toowoomba reduced. However, there was a need for male apprentice accommodation, so in 1979 the branch adjusted the YWCA policy to allow the admission of both males and females to Gowrie House.

Due to the growth in tertiary education facilities and students in Toowoomba, and the growth in disabled students needing accommodation in the late 1980s, the YWCA launched a major building appeal programme. The aim was to increase accommodation to 42, erect a new ablution and laundry block, and additions of kitchen, dining room and activities room plus wheelchair facilities. Fund raising, donations and a grant through the Queensland Government Housing Accommodation Assistance Scheme enabled the expansion.

Extra facilities and accommodation have been added to the house over time so that it could cope with pressure of changing times. This included, for example, the addition of wheel chair access, increased accommodation by adding new wings, as well as modernising and maintaining the complex. The Gowrie House complex is the association's Toowoomba headquarters and is the only remaining Queensland YWCA owned hostel that continues to provide accommodation to students, disabled persons, travellers and members with its 42 rooms that include single, double and twin rooms.

A 1995 survey of Toowoomba's heritage places, the Toowoomba inner residential area heritage study, included Gowrie House as a place of special consideration site.

== Description ==
Gowrie House is a large, low-set brick residence located on a large block on the corner of Mary and Arthur Streets, Toowoomba.

The core of this brick house has a symmetrical front facade; a central entrance porch separating bay windows which extend through the veranda roof and are surmounted by a finial. The steep hipped corrugated iron roof rises to a lace-trimmed widow's walk.

It is built of 23–32-centimetre (9.1–12.6 in) thick cavity bricks on foundations of bluestone from the Harlaxton quarry, and the limited subfloor has hit-and-miss brick infill. Wide concrete steps lead up to a prominent portico with "Largo" etched in the fretwork gable pediment which is supported by paired timber posts while the wide veranda is edged by intricate iron lace. Use of lighter coloured bricks for quoins framing windows and wall edges are also employed, and this emphasises the separation of higher and lower gutter lines, as do the timber brackets supporting the superior roof.

An arch with a timber panelled base and stained glass above frames the wide six-panel front door. The arch above the door consists of three arcs, stained glass separated by concrete. The U-shaped veranda is enclosed on the northern side, while on the southern side it terminates at a gable-roofed room. Concrete stairs from the veranda give access to the garden while a door surmounted by a fanlight give entrance to a bay-windowed room. The bay window has sash windows with a concrete lintel and sill. Attention is drawn to the crenellated roof by the use of coloured brickwork. Above this is a flying gable with a finial.

As is typical with such houses, the service facilities are less ornate, so that the room on the other side of this gable-roofed room has the same double sash windows, lintel and sill, but has a shallower hip roof. A small porch gives access to this room.

The three vented chimneys, unusual exterior sash windows and window decorations are typical of Harry Marks designs.

Internally, the building is largely intact. Apart from the modern kitchen, and a door opening between two of the former bedrooms, there are few changes. Surviving details in the house include doors, skirtings, all fire surrounds, plaster ceilings, coving, windows and stained glass. The original gas lamp remains in the entry.

Gowrie House is set back from the road and a new garden has been constructed around its western and southern elevations, while the grounds include several mature trees.

== Heritage listing ==
Gowrie House was listed on the Queensland Heritage Register on 25 August 2000 having satisfied the following criteria.

The place is important in demonstrating the evolution or pattern of Queensland's history.

Acquired by the Young Women's Christian Association of Toowoomba in 1945, it offered secure accommodation to young women working and studying in Toowoomba until 1979 when societal changes meant that both sexes could obtain lodgings in this old house. It is the only YWCA owned hostel still operating in Queensland. The use of the building and subsequent additions reflect the changes in accommodation needs for females and value of the YWCA to the community.

The place is important in demonstrating the principal characteristics of a particular class of cultural places.

Gowrie House displays the inventiveness and creativity typical of Marks' design work and is an excellent example of the architects work.

The place is important because of its aesthetic significance.

It is one of a number of extant buildings designed by the Mark's family that contribute to the architectural character of Toowoomba.

The place has a special association with the life or work of a particular person, group or organisation of importance in Queensland's history.

Gowrie House, a large low-set brick building designed by prominent Toowoomba architect HJ Marks for leading building contractor Alexander Mayes c. 1901. Mayes was a Mayor of Toowoomba and active in community organisations. Gowrie House is significant for its association with both these Toowoomba identities.
