= Whyembah =

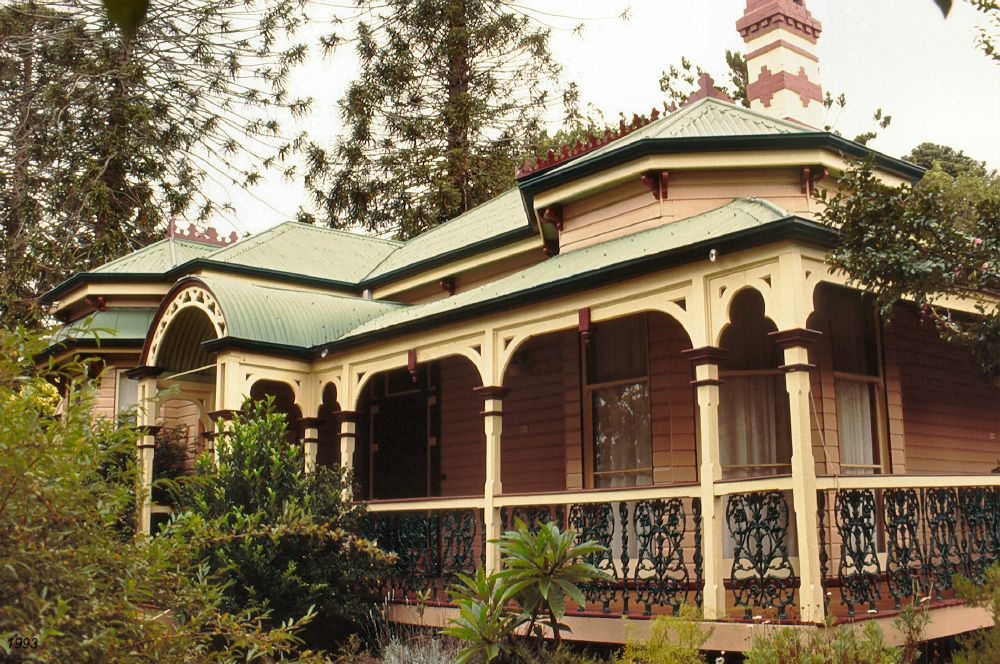
- Whyembah, 1993

- Location within Queensland Location within Australia
- 27.5569°S 151.9624°E
- Location: 80 Campbell Street, East Toowoomba, Toowoomba, Toowoomba Region, Queensland, Australia

History
- Design period: 1870s–1890s (late 19th century)
- Built: c. 1896–1906

Queensland Heritage Register
- Official name: Whyembah
- Type: state heritage (built, landscape)
- Designated: 11 June 1993
- Reference no.: 600841
- Significant period: 1890s–1900s (fabric, historical)
- Significant components: residential accommodation – main house, garden/grounds

Whyembah is a heritage-listed detached house at 80 Campbell Street, East Toowoomba, Toowoomba, Toowoomba Region, Queensland, Australia. It was built c. 1896, and renovated and enlarged in 1906. It is sometimes spelled differently, e.g. Wyembar.

The Queensland Heritage Council found that Whyembah was significant because it "demonstrates the principal characteristics of an 1890s ornate timber house in Toowoomba, and as a particularly picturesque house in a tree-lined street which includes a number of decorated timber houses, it exhibits aesthetic characteristics valued by the community" and it "illustrates the pattern of Toowoomba's development as a regional centre for southern Queensland".

It was added to the Queensland Heritage Register on 11 June 1993.

== History ==
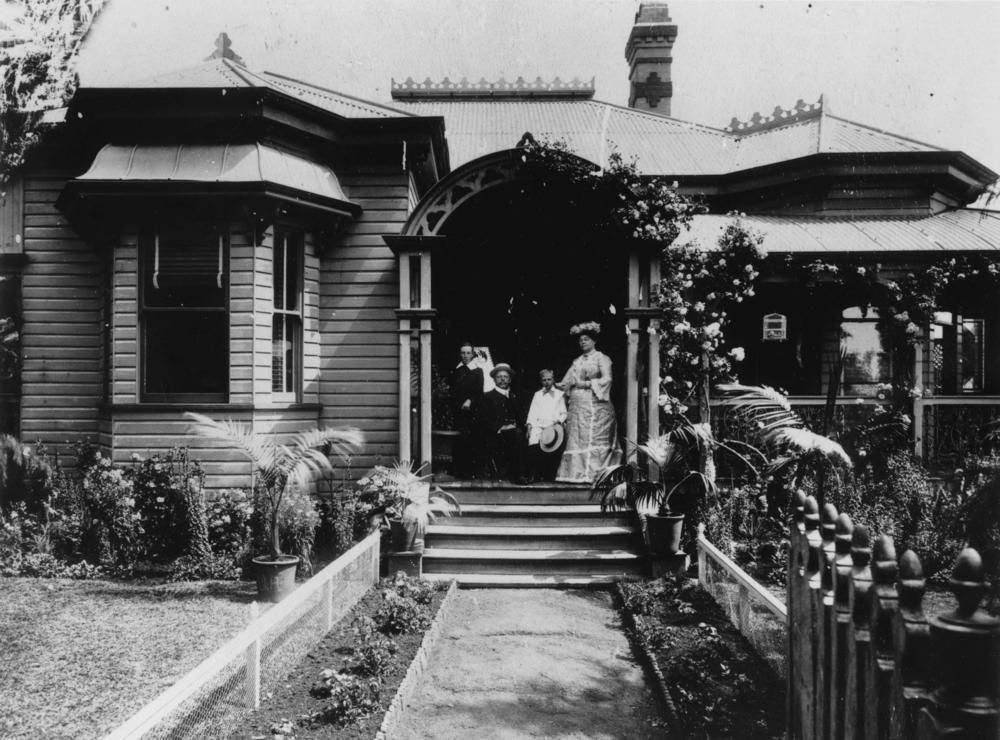
Whyembah, circa 1905

Whyembah was built c. 1896 for John Rosser, a commercial traveller with the Brisbane firm of Thurlow and Co. Whyembah originally stood on approximately 1r 29p of land, adjacent to Queens Park in Campbell Street. Rosser was a keen lawn bowler, and the grounds of Whyembah included a bowling green at one time.

The house was renovated and enlarged in 1906, and the ceilings and walls lined in pressed metal.

After Rosser's death in 1925, his widow Margaret Ferrier Rosser remained at Whyembah. The property was acquired by William Ross Mackenzie in 1943 with the condition that Margaret Rosser could continue to reside at Whyembah until her death.

The property changed hands a number of times. During the 1970s it was turned into flats. Whyembah was acquired by new owners in 1979, who subsequently renovated and extended the house.

In 2007, the property was sold for $1,265,000.

In September 2010, Whyembah was bought at auction for $1,000,000 by Ken Gouldthorp, the chief executive officer of the Toowoomba Regional Council.

In November 2014, the property was being offered for sale.

== Description ==
Whyembah is a picturesque weatherboard house with a corrugated iron roof. It is located next to Queens Park, on a street with an avenue of mature trees and other timber houses, some of which are similar in form to Whyembah. The house is single storeyed, with a recent two-storeyed extension to the rear which meticulously imitates the original in external detail.

The exterior is an assemblage of projecting bays and verandahs, with roofs intersecting at the base of a flat-top pyramid roof. The eastern elevation has a projecting hipped roof bay, adjacent to a closed in verandah with a curved roof. The street elevation has a small balcony at the end of the closed-in verandah, which sits next to a projecting bay window. The street entrance, consisting of a projecting barrel vault supported on paired timber posts, is centrally placed. An L-shaped verandah links the street entrance to a less formal side entrance to the west, and contains a projecting corner bay window. Another bay window extends out from a projecting hipped bay at the southern end of the western frontage.

The house is rich in its decorative detailing. The verandah posts are chamfered, and have curved valances. The balustrades are cast iron. The main roof has curved eaves brackets, and sheet metal cresting adorns both the flat top of the main roof and the ridges of the smaller roofs. A polychrome brick chimney rises to the rear. The bay windows have small curved lead awnings, and the barrel vaulted entry has arched timber fretwork.

The house has timber sliding sash windows and timber doors. The street entry door has stained glass set in timber surrounds. The house contains some fine pressed metal wall and ceiling sheeting.

Whyembah sits on the northern end of a block of 1942 sq metres; the garden contain mature palms to the rear of the block, and a timber gatehouse to the south west corner.

== Heritage listing ==
Whyembah was listed on the Queensland Heritage Register on 11 June 1993 having satisfied the following criteria.

The place is important in demonstrating the evolution or pattern of Queensland's history.

Whyembah, erected c. 1896, illustrates the pattern of Toowoomba's development as a regional centre for southern Queensland.

The place is important in demonstrating the principal characteristics of a particular class of cultural places.

It demonstrates the principal characteristics of an 1890s ornate timber house in Toowoomba, and as a particularly picturesque house in a tree-lined street which includes a number of decorated timber houses, it exhibits aesthetic characteristics valued by the community.

The place is important because of its aesthetic significance.

It demonstrates the principal characteristics of an 1890s ornate timber house in Toowoomba, and as a particularly picturesque house in a tree-lined street which includes a number of decorated timber houses, it exhibits aesthetic characteristics valued by the community.
