= Toowoomba East State School =

School in Queensland, Australia

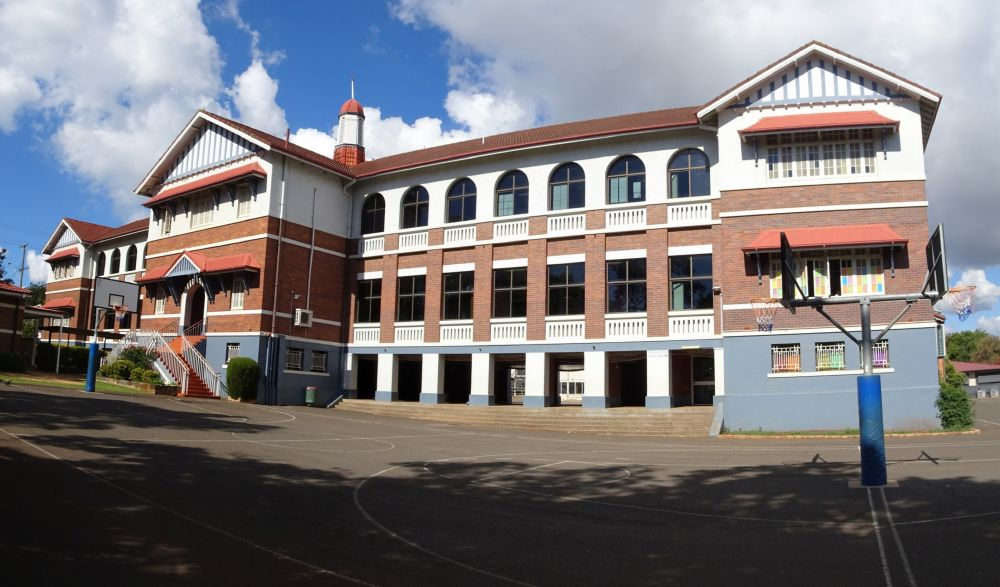
- Block A, north elevation

- Location within Queensland
- 27.5604°S 151.9659°E
- Location: Corner of Arthur and Mary Streets, East Toowoomba, Toowoomba Region, Queensland, Australia

History
- Design period: 1919–1930s (Interwar period)
- Built: 1935–1936, Block A

Queensland Heritage Register
- Official name: Toowoomba East State School
- Type: state heritage
- Designated: 28 July 2017
- Reference no.: 650050
- Type: Education, Research, Scientific Facility: School – state (primary)
- Theme: Educating Queenslanders: Providing primary schooling
- Builders: Department of Public Works

Toowoomba East State School is a heritage-listed state school on the corner of Arthur and Mary Streets, East Toowoomba, Toowoomba Region, Queensland, Australia. It was built from 1935 to 1936 by the Queensland Department of Public Works. It was originally known as Queen's Park State School. It was added to the Queensland Heritage Register on 28 July 2017.

== History ==
Toowoomba East State School (SS) opened in 1887, on its current site east of Queens Park, to service the population growth in East Toowoomba at the time. The school is important in demonstrating the evolution of state education and its associated architecture. The school retains a Depression-era brick school building (Block A, 1936); set in landscaped grounds, with sporting facilities and mature trees. The school has been in continuous operation since its establishment.

Traditional country of the Giabal and Jarowair people, European settlement of the Toowoomba area commenced in 1840 when squatters occupied pastoral runs on the Darling Downs. At the junction of two routes to Gorman's and Hodgson's gaps through the Main Range, the small settlement of Drayton evolved from 1842 as a stopping place for pastoralists and travellers. Six kilometres to its north-east was an area known as "The Swamp" – renamed Toowoomba by 1859 – which was first surveyed in 1849 as 12 suburban allotments of Drayton.

Toowoomba grew rapidly due to its superior land and water supply, support from squatters and land speculators, and, from 1855, providing an easier route to Brisbane via the Toll Bar Road. Toowoomba was declared a municipality (the Borough of Toowoomba) in July 1860, and by the 1861 census it was clear that Toowoomba had eclipsed Drayton. The Main Line railway arrived in 1867 (connecting to Brisbane in 1876), and Toowoomba's economy diversified to include numerous small-scale manufacturing outlets, while the majority of administrative, service and other government and education functions for the surrounding region were centred on the town. Toowoomba was also popular as a summer retreat for the colony's elite. It was declared a city (the City of Toowoomba) in 1904 and by 1911 had a population of 10,636.

Toowoomba was an early centre for education, with the area's first National School (later Toowoomba South State School) opening in 1865. The establishment of schools was considered an essential step in the development of early/new communities and integral to their success. Locals often donated land and labour for a school's construction and the school community contributed to maintenance and development. Schools became a community focus, a symbol of progress, and a source of pride, with enduring connections formed with past pupils, parents, and teachers.

To help ensure consistency and economy, the Queensland Government developed standard plans for its school buildings. From the 1860s until the 1960s, Queensland school buildings were predominantly timber-framed, an easy and cost-effective approach that also enabled the government to provide facilities in remote areas. Standard designs were continually refined in response to changing needs and educational philosophy and Queensland school buildings were particularly innovative in climate control, lighting, and ventilation. Standardisation produced distinctly similar schools across Queensland with complexes of typical components.

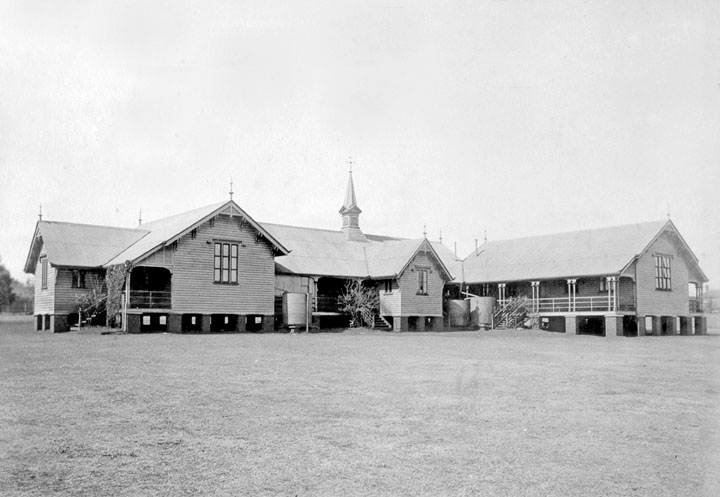
Original school building, circa 1890

Toowoomba East SS, opened on 17 January 1887, was established on a 2.5 acre (1ha) reserve for a National School at the corner of Mary Street and Margaret Street, which had been gazetted in 1872. Although there was local pressure for a school in East Toowoomba from 1876, when fund raising by the community began, the population was not large enough to justify a state school. As a result of later population growth, the Queensland Government approved a school in East Toowoomba in October 1885. By this time the community had collected £200 of the £290 required as its one-fifth share of the £1433 construction cost, and the school was also initially referred to as Queen's Park State School. The school consisted of a timber building set on brick piers, with two classrooms, close to the corner of Mary Street and Arthur Street. It was designed to accommodate 250 students, and had admitted 235 students by February 1887.

Growing student numbers – with 778 enrolled by 1927 – soon led to additions to Toowoomba East SS. By 1913 there were three timber buildings; a fourth (Infants) wing was added in 1928; and a fifth wing in 1932. A school residence, built in 1889, stood in the southeast corner of the reserve, fronting Mary Street; and a school bell on a stand was erected the same year.

As well as more buildings, the school required larger grounds to cater for growing student numbers. In 1926, 1.25 acres (0.5ha) of land was added.

The school was also beautified by tree plantings from 1888, including on the west side of the original school reserve and along its Arthur and Mary Street frontages. An important component of Queensland state schools was their grounds. The early and continuing commitment to play-based education, particularly in primary school, resulted in the provision of outdoor play space and sporting facilities, such as ovals and tennis courts. Also, trees and gardens were planted to shade and beautify schools. Arbor Day celebrations began in Queensland in 1890. Aesthetically designed gardens were encouraged by regional inspectors, and educators believed gardening and Arbor Days instilled in young minds the value of hard work and activity, improved classroom discipline, developed aesthetic tastes, and inspired people to stay on the land. Twelve camphor laurels were planted along the west fence in 1898, to provide shelter from westerly winds and by 1922 Toowoomba East SS had "large camphor and other ornamental and shade trees".

The school's timber buildings were still not sufficient for student numbers, and in the mid-1930s a new brick school building was approved for Toowoomba East SS. The Great Depression, commencing in 1929 and extending well into the 1930s, caused a dramatic reduction of public building work in Queensland and brought private building work to a standstill. In response, the Queensland Government provided relief work for unemployed Queenslanders, and also embarked on an ambitious and important building program to provide impetus to the economy.

Even before the October 1929 stock market crash, the Queensland Government initiated an Unemployment Relief Scheme, through a work program administered by the Department of Public Works (DPW). This included painting and repairs to school buildings. By mid-1930 men were undertaking grounds improvement works to schools under the scheme.

In June 1932 the Forgan Smith Labor Government came to power from a campaign that advocated increased government spending to counter the effects of the Depression. The government embarked on a large public building program designed to promote the employment of local skilled workers, the purchase of local building materials and the production of commodious, low maintenance buildings which would be a long-term asset to the state. The construction of substantial brick school buildings in prosperous or growing suburban areas and regional centres during the 1930s provided tangible proof of the government's commitment to remedy the unemployment situation.

Depression-era brick school buildings form a recognisable and important type, exhibiting many common characteristics. Most were designed in a classical idiom to project the sense of stability and optimism which the government sought to convey through the architecture of its public buildings. Frequently, they were two storeys above an open undercroft and built to accommodate up to 1000 students. They adopted a symmetrical plan form and often exhibited a prominent central entry. The plan arrangement was similar to that of timber buildings, being only one classroom deep, accessed by a long straight verandah or corridor. Due to their long plan forms of multiple wings, they could be built in stages if necessary; resulting in some complete designs never being realised. Classrooms were commonly divided by folding timber partitions and the undercroft was used as covered play space, storage, ablutions and other functions.

Despite their similarities, each Depression-era brick school building was individually designed by a DPW architect, which resulted in a wide range of styles and ornamental features being utilised within the overall set. These styles were derived from contemporary tastes and fashions. Over time, variations occurred in building size, decorative treatment, and climatic-responsive features.

Construction of the Depression-era brick school building (Block A in 2017) at Toowoomba East SS occurred during 1935–36, for a cost of £16,326. The new building was sited parallel to, and facing, Arthur Street, after relocation of the old timber buildings. As the new building was only designed for 640 students, and enrolment was 1000 by the time it was officially opened on 8 May 1937 by James Kane, the Member of the Queensland Legislative Assembly for East Toowoomba, it was necessary to retain at least four of the old timber buildings. These were relocated at a distance behind the new brick building to form a parade ground between them. The school residence was removed c. 1936.

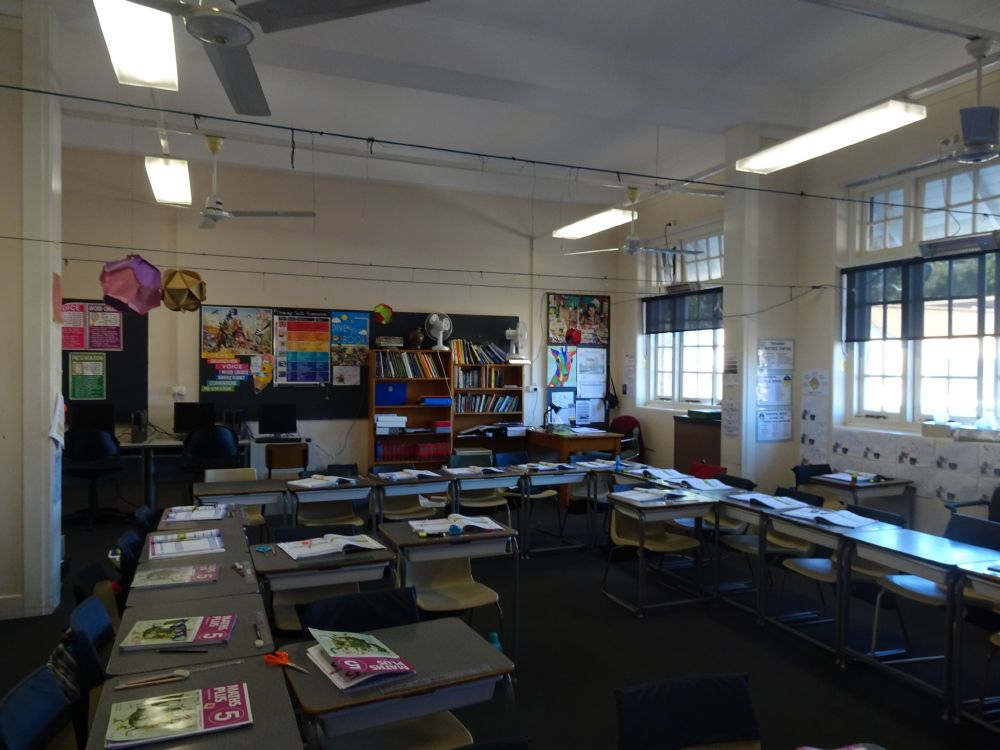
First floor classroom in Block A

Block A was constructed with three levels, consisting of an undercroft with two floors of eight classrooms above, for a total of 16 classrooms. The undercroft comprised play areas with concrete floors and drinking troughs and had openings leading out to the grounds via broad concrete stairs. The first and second floors had similar layouts. They comprised a long wing of six classrooms divided by a central stairwell. The eastern three classrooms had connecting doors; while the western three classrooms were separated by folding partitions, which could be opened to form a large assembly room. Each classroom was oriented so that students faced west to a wall-mounted hyloplate (blackboard) and had two large banks of windows on their south side, giving gentle southern natural left-hand light to students, forced to write with their right hand. A verandah-like, open corridor ran along the north side of the classrooms providing access. Projecting north from the corridor was a central entrance block. On the first floor this comprised an entry hall, reached from the front garden by a branching stair, with a head teachers and male teachers room, one either side of the hall. On the second floor, this block comprised a female teachers room and a cloak room. At each end of the long wing was a short perpendicular wing, comprising a stairwell, perpendicular corridor, cloak room and another classroom, which had north-facing windows and hyloplates on the east wall to ensure light from the "correct" side. At the landing of the central stairwell between first and second floors was a balconette that opened out to the south side overlooking the parade ground behind.

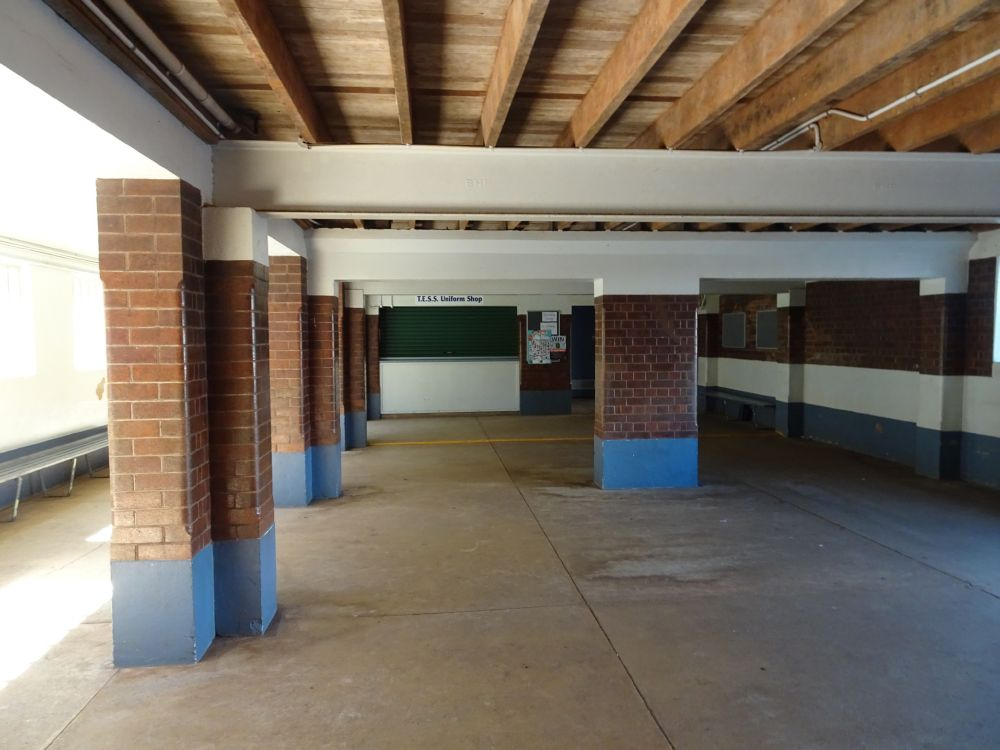
Undercroft of Block A

The walls of the three storeys were differentiated, with painted cement render on the undercroft, exposed brickwork for the first floor up to the window sill height of the second floor, and painted cement render above that to the eaves line. Sunhoods, supported on substantial timber brackets, shaded all banks of windows on the first and second floors. The hipped and gabled roof was clad with asbestos cement shingles, and the three gables on the north side of the building were battened and clad with fibro-cement. A large ventilation fleche topped the centre of the roof above the entrance.

During the 1950s further additions were made to the school's accommodation and grounds. In 1955, additional land was added to the west side of the school grounds, resumed from neighbouring residential allotments. Later grounds extensions, to the west and south of the original school reserve, from the 1960s onwards, meant that by 2012 the grounds covered 3.4ha. By 1956 a highset brick extension (Block B in 2017), with two classrooms had been constructed attached to the west end of the rear (south) of Block A. This building was renovated in c. 2016, enclosing its verandahs and demolishing the wall between verandahs and classrooms to create larger teaching areas.

Changes were also made to Block A. In 1966, the cloak room at the west end of the first floor was converted into a Health Services room. In c. 1974, two classrooms at the east end of the first floor of the centre wing were used as staff rooms, while another classroom was used as the principal's office, and another was divided in half by a partition to accommodate a store room and Health Services Room. One cloak room was converted to a store room while another was converted to a work room. In c. 1979, the undercroft was partially enclosed with glass louvres and doors. The northern corridors were enclosed with glazing by 1997. In c. 1997, the centre wing was altered in "upgrading" works. This involved partitioning the northern corridors on both floors to create practical learning areas; replacing the French doors from the corridor into the classrooms with a single wide door with a half leaf; demolishing partitions between the classrooms on both floors to create two classrooms out of each set of three; and relining the ceilings with flat sheets to provide fire proofing.

Changes and additions to facilities since the 1960s have included: a school swimming pool (1966); new classroom buildings (1969–71); the removal of three of the early timber school buildings in the 1970s; a new library and a dental clinic facing Mary Street (1973); two pre-school buildings south of the swimming pool, near Margaret Street (by 1978); a Centenary Hall facing Arthur Street; covered ways south of Block A; and a new administration building north of Block A (1991). The last of the early school buildings, the 1928 Infants building (later designated the Clare Gormley Block), was demolished sometime between 2009 and 2011. In 2015, 807 students were enrolled. Students utilise sports fields in Queens Park to the west, and the Clive Berghofer Stadium to the north.

In 2017, Toowoomba East State School continues to operate from its original site, and its Depression-era brick school building is a local landmark. The school is important to the area as a focus for the community, and generations of students have been taught there.

== Description ==
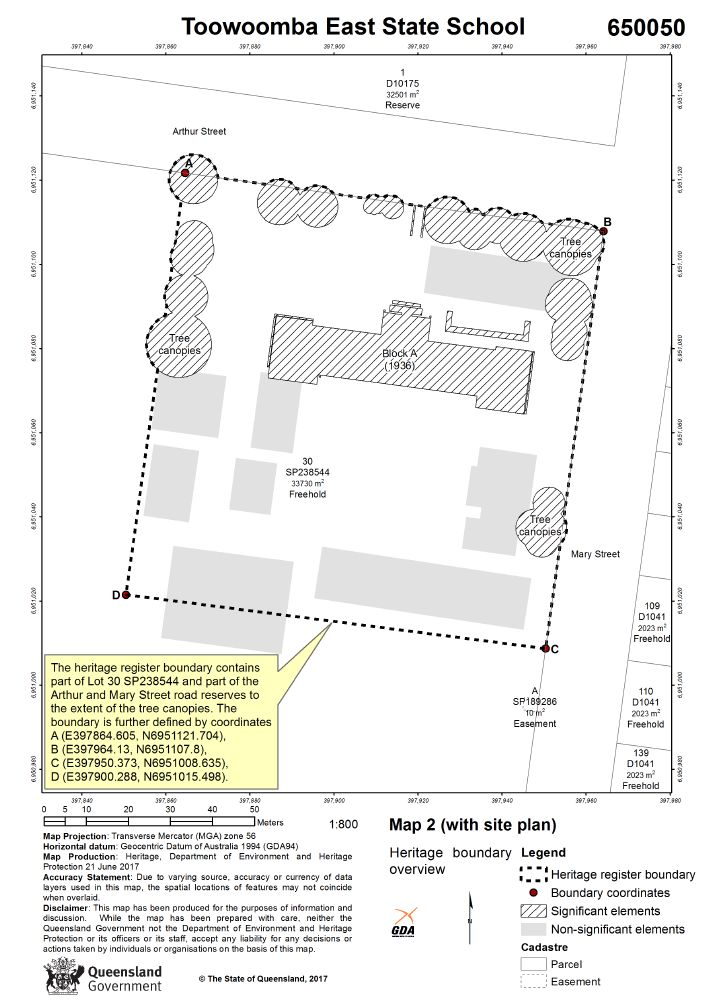
Site map, 2017

Toowoomba East State School occupies a large, 3.37ha site in East Toowoomba, fronting Arthur Street to the north and bounded by Mary Street to the east. A substantial Depression-era brick school building, Block A, stands at the front of the school grounds, surrounded by mature trees and gardens. Attractive views are visible to and from the school and it is conspicuous in the area due to its handsome architecture, open playing fields, and impressive mature trees.

=== Block A (1936) ===
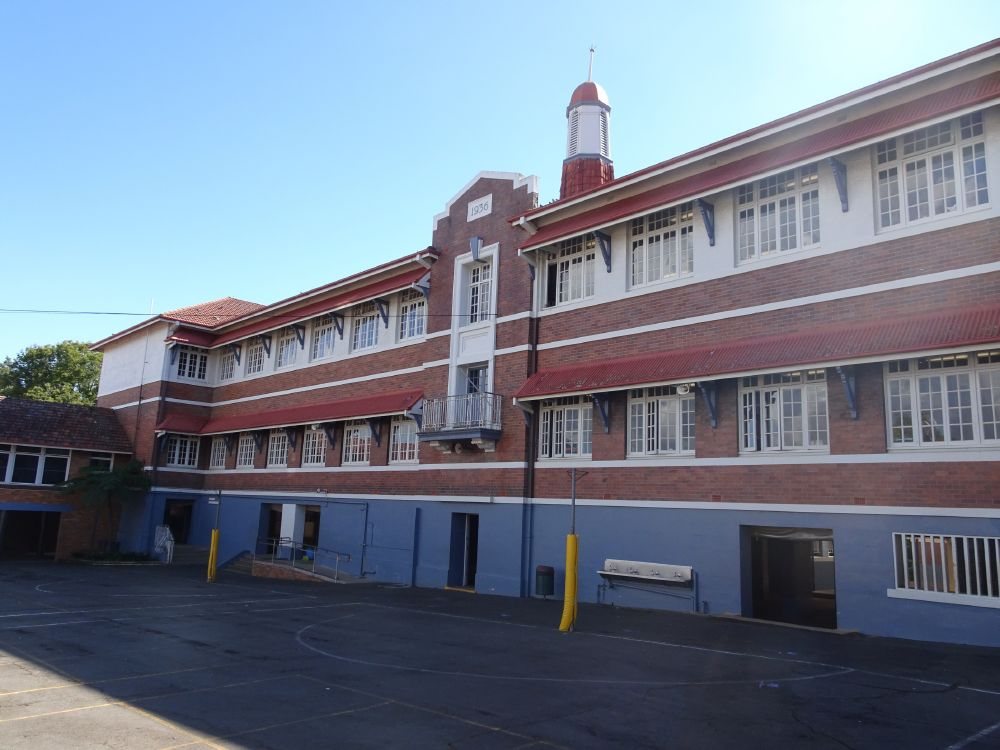
Block A, south elevation

Block A is a symmetrical two-storey building set high on an open undercroft level and has a hipped and gabled roof clad with tiles. At the roof's central peak is a prominent metal ventilation fleche with round cupola, visible from the surrounding residential neighbourhood. The building character expresses a composed simplicity through the use of attractive, simple, and low maintenance materials with minimal decorative features, including extensive use of glazed dark face bricks internally and externally contrasting with smooth-rendered concrete dressings and plain, regular fenestration.

The building comprises an undercroft level of open play spaces below two levels of teaching rooms and its facades are defined horizontally with three materials: smooth-rendered masonry with lined coursing at undercroft level; facebrick for the first floor up to the sill level of the second floor; and painted roughcast render above. The building form is a long wing of classrooms with a centre stairwell. A long corridor across the front (north) of this wing provides access to the rooms. The corridor has simple rendered balustrades with square balusters; it has square openings on the first floor and arched openings on the second floor. However, these openings have been enclosed with later glazing that is not of cultural heritage significance. Projecting forward of the centre of the corridor is an entrance block of primarily teachers' rooms, and at either end of the long wing is a short perpendicular wing comprising a classroom, a former cloak room, and a stairwell. The central entrance block and the end wings are emphasised by front-facing gable roofs with timber battening, banks of multi-paned timber-framed casement windows with fanlights, and window hoods supported by large timber brackets. At the centre of the entrance block is a branching cement rendered stair with simple metal balustrades. It leads up to the front arched doorway, which is flanked by narrow window openings and shaded by a window hood that features a battened triangular pediment.

The building layout is highly intact, retaining its original configuration. The undercroft retains original perimeter seats, metal grilles to openings, and rounded corners to the brick pillars. However, some new lightweight partitions have been installed to create storage spaces, which are not of cultural heritage significance. The undercroft play area is connected to bitumen-surfaced play areas in front and behind the building via multiple openings and broad concrete steps.

The first floor configuration comprises a short entrance hall with teachers rooms either side, leading to the corridor and classrooms behind. The wall between the corridor and the classrooms retains tall, double hung timber-framed windows, and French doors with fanlights, and although some French doors have been replaced with later doors, the fanlights survive throughout. However, the partitions between the classrooms of the centre wing have been removed to create larger classrooms, with nibs and bulkheads retained to indicate their former location. New partitions have been installed in one classroom and to enclose the cloak rooms for further staff rooms, and in the centre wing to create larger classrooms.

The first and second floors are very similar configurations, with identical removal of partitions and similar insertion of new partitions.

On both levels, the classrooms feature abundant natural light, simple timber joinery, and lofty ceilings. The corridors, cloak rooms, stairwells, and stairwells have smooth concrete ceilings, which is the original condition. The classrooms of the end wings retain the original sheets and battens lined ceilings but those of the centre wing are lined with recent flat sheet material and have modern cornices. The stairwells have simple iron balustrades with moulded clear-finished timber handrails and concrete stairs.

At the stair landing between first and second floors of the centre stairwell, a set of timber-framed, glazed French doors lead out onto a narrow balcony that overlooks a parade ground immediately to the rear of the building. Capable of only accommodating one or two people, the balcony is the centre and focus of the southern facade composition, emphasised by a small projecting bay with a triangular pediment at the roofline bearing "1936" in raised, rendered numerals, and including a moulded rendered architrave that stretches up to the second-floor window above, topped by a stylised "keystone". The balcony is supported by scrolled rendered brackets and has a simple metal balustrade with an attached metal flagpole. It draws attention through its use of decoration on an otherwise simple facade and being centred under the tall roof fleche.

Attached to the western end of Block A is a high-set one storey classroom building, Block B (by 1956), which is not heritage-listed. A doorway has been cut into the rear (south) wall of the first floor stairway at this end of Block A to connect through to the building.

=== Grounds ===
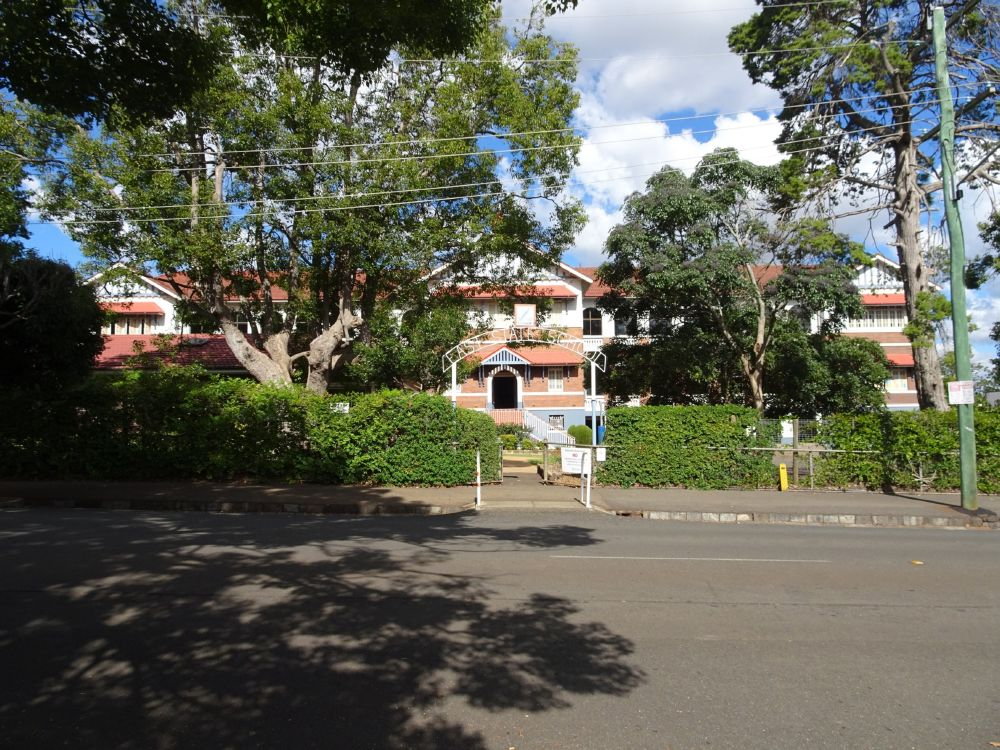
Trees and archway entrance from Arthur Street

The grounds of the school are largely flat with open playing areas and other teaching buildings. The boundaries of the school have mature trees, including camphor laurels (Cinnamomum camphora) at regularly spaced intervals and other specimen trees, including jacarandas (Jacaranda mimosifolia).

The main front entrance to the school is emphasised with a metal arch with "EAST STATE SCHOOL" in metal letters over a concrete path flanked by long, stone edged garden beds. This entrance is aligned with the centre of Block A.

Other stone edged garden beds stand around the base of Block A.

At the rear of Block A is a large open bitumen-surfaced parade ground. This is a simple and plain area that provides an unfussy setting to and allows uninterrupted views of Block A, as well as an open and flexible playing and assembly space for the school.

An early metal school bell stands on a tall post in the rear parade ground close to the southern wall of Block A.

Views to Block A occur from the surrounding residential neighbourhood and Toowoomba East State School is an attractive and prominent element in the built landscape.

== Heritage listing ==
Toowoomba East State School was listed on the Queensland Heritage Register on 28 July 2017 having satisfied the following criteria.

The place is important in demonstrating the evolution or pattern of Queensland's history.

Toowoomba East State School (established in 1887) is important in demonstrating the evolution of state education and its associated architecture in Queensland. The place retains an excellent, representative example of a government-designed school building that was an architectural response to prevailing government educational philosophies.

The Depression-era brick school building (1936) is a result of the Queensland Government's building and relief work programs during the 1930s that stimulated the economy and provided work for men unemployed as a result of the Great Depression.

The place is important in demonstrating the principal characteristics of a particular class of cultural places.

Toowoomba East State School is important in demonstrating the principal characteristics of a Queensland state school built during the Depression-era. These include: a large brick school building set in landscaped grounds with mature shade trees, assembly, play, and sports areas.

The Depression-era brick school building is an excellent, substantial, and intact example of its type, demonstrating the principal characteristics, which include: a handsome edifice standing at the front of the school; symmetrical two-storey form of classrooms and teachers rooms above an undercroft of open play spaces; a linear layout of the main floors with rooms accessed by corridors; loadbearing masonry construction; prominent projecting central entrance bay, and high-quality design to provide superior educational environments that focus on abundant natural light and ventilation. It demonstrates the use of stylistic features of its era, which determined its roof form, joinery, and decorative treatment.

The place is important because of its aesthetic significance.

Through its conspicuous position at the front of the school, substantial size and height, symmetry, elegant composition, restrained use of decoration, and fine craftsmanship, the Depression-era brick school building has aesthetic significance due to its expressive attributes, by which the Department of Public Works sought to convey the concepts of progress and permanence.

The building is also significant for its streetscape contribution. Framed by mature trees, it is an attractive and prominent feature of the area.

The place has a strong or special association with a particular community or cultural group for social, cultural or spiritual reasons.

Schools have always played an important part in Queensland communities. They typically retain significant and enduring connections with former pupils, parents, and teachers; provide a venue for social interaction and volunteer work; and are a source of pride, symbolising local progress and aspirations.

Toowoomba East State School has a strong and ongoing association with the community. It was established in 1887 through the fundraising efforts of the local community and generations of Toowoomba children have been taught there. The place is important for its contribution to the educational development of Toowoomba and is a prominent community focal point.

== Notable students ==
- Don Featherstone, filmmaker
- John Row, Member of the Queensland Legislative Assembly

== See also ==
- History of state education in Queensland
- List of schools in Darling Downs
