= Toowoomba Technical College =

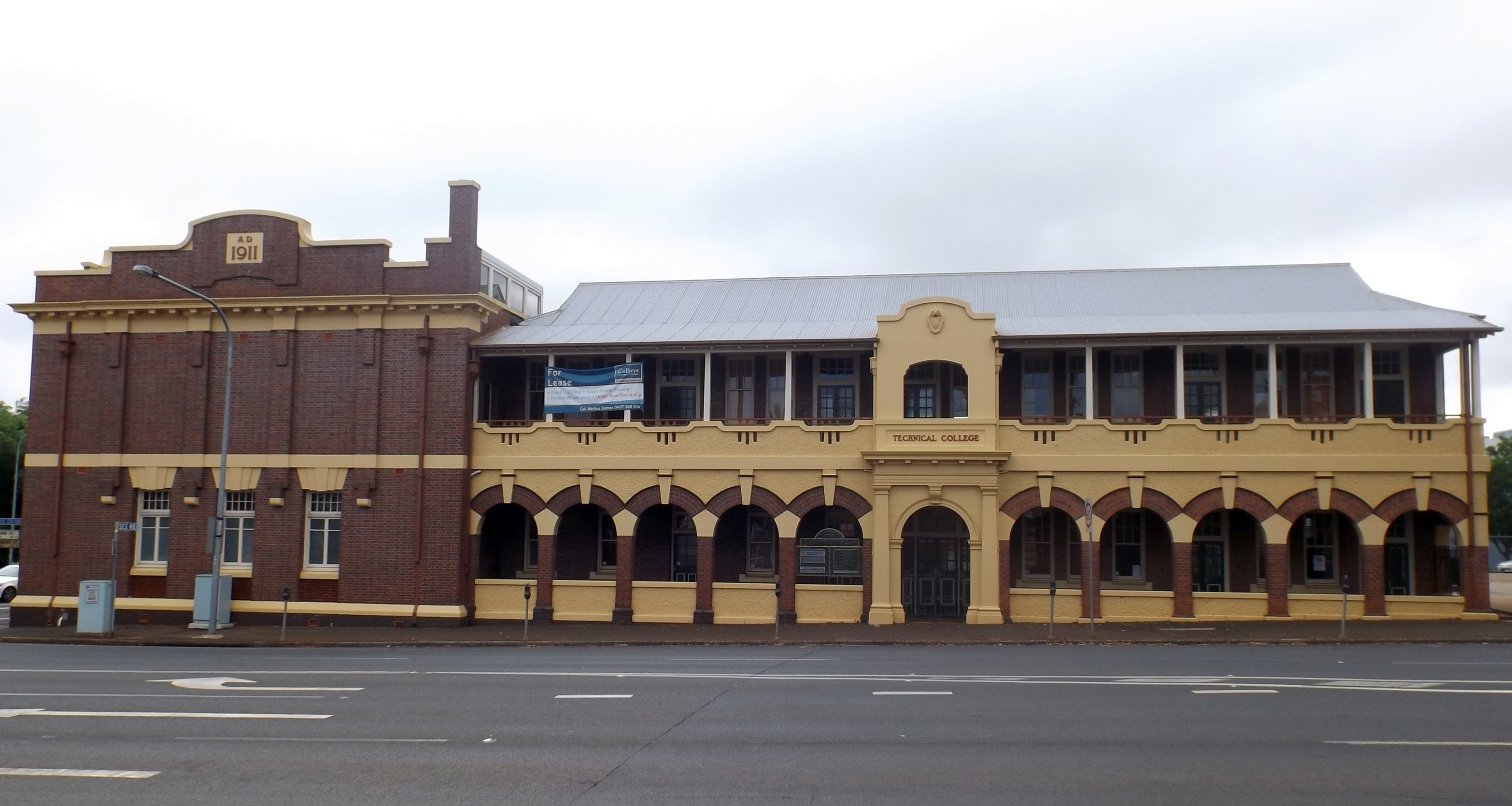
- Hume Street side, 2014

- Location within Queensland Location within Australia
- 27.562°S 151.9579°E
- Location: 124 Margaret Street, East Toowoomba, Toowoomba, Toowoomba Region, Queensland, Australia

History
- Design period: 1900–1914 (early 20th century)
- Built: 1911

Site notes
- Architect: Thomas Pye
- Architectural style: Classicism

Queensland Heritage Register
- Official name: Toowoomba Technical College (former), Southern Queensland Institute of Technical and Further Education (SQIT), Hume Street Campus
- Type: state heritage (built)
- Designated: 21 October 1992
- Reference no.: 600851
- Significant period: 1910s (historical); 1910s (fabric); 1910s–1990s (social)
- Significant components: classroom/classroom block/teaching area

Toowoomba Technical College is a heritage-listed former technical college at 124 Margaret Street, East Toowoomba, Toowoomba, Toowoomba Region, Queensland, Australia. It was designed by Thomas Pye and built in 1911. It is also known as Southern Queensland Institute of Technical & Further Education (SQIT), Hume Street Campus. It was added to the Queensland Heritage Register on 21 October 1992.

== History ==
The former Toowoomba Technical College, constructed in 1911, was purpose built for the provision of vocational education and training for the people of the Toowoomba and the Darling Downs region. Designed by the Department of Public Works employee, Thomas Pye, the building is a large two-storey brick structure and is a good example of the style of education facilities that government architect's were producing at the time.

Vocational education had been established in Toowoomba at least by 1898. Such education was in the form of the Toowoomba School of Arts. This building was substantially damaged by fire on 21 June 1898, an event that was reported in the Toowoomba Chronicle on 22 June 1898. Following the fire, the city council decided that a new town hall should be built on the School of Arts site. The new Toowoomba City Hall, constructed in 1900, incorporated a public hall, municipal offices and chambers as well as rooms for a school of arts and technical college.

The Technical College remained in the city hall until the construction of the new building in 1911. The site for the Toowoomba Technical College building, now known as Block A, was acquired in 1908 and the building was constructed in 1911, the foundation stone being laid by Sir William MacGregor, Governor of Queensland. The development of a purpose-built technical college in Toowoomba followed the formation of the Department of Public Instruction in 1905, established to centralise the control of technical education in Queensland. Prior to this, technical education in Toowoomba had been organised by local committees, often associated with the School of Arts. With the intervention of the government, funding improved and a number of new purpose-designed buildings were constructed.

The Toowoomba Technical College building was designed by the Department of Public Works and built by Alexander Mayes, a Toowoomba contractor and later Mayor of Toowoomba from 1916 to 1917. At this time, the Under Secretary for Public Works, Government Architect and Engineer for Bridges was A. B. Brady. The building was designed by architect Thomas Pye and in style, illustrates the most substantial type of educational institutions coming from the Government architect's office at the time. The solid, free-classical design is surmounted by a hipped room, covered with "rolled iron" and topped with a ventilation fleche; the signature of a public building from this age. The urban nature of the site is reflected in the corner pavilions, with cornices and parapets, that are built up to the street alignment of the property. The design also responded to the sun by minimising western windows and providing south light for the "art room" - two major studio style rooms that were situated on the first floor.

Pye's approach to the site was to design a large two-storeyed building with two smaller detached single-storey buildings to be used for a chemical laboratory and a carpentry workshop, and two buildings containing earth closets. The main building as built in 1911 substantially follows the original sketch design, however, the brick chemical laboratory and carpentry workshop were deleted. In 1913, a timber carpentry workshop was built in the position envisaged by Pye. In 1929, the need for additional space for Domestic Science was met by moving the timber carpentry workshop closer to the main building, raising it and building in underneath to form a two-storeyed block (Block B). In 1931, a brick workshop building (Block D) was built on the site of the original timber carpenters workshop, which had been relocated in 1929. A "temporary" timber building containing two classrooms was constructed between the two brick buildings in 1955 (Block C). When the main building was extended in 1939, a design sympathetic to the 1911 design was used.

The main building underwent minor alterations in 1940 and again in 1979 with few changes to the original layout of the building. The college and the high school remained combined until 1962, when the high school separated and moved to another site. The restrictions of the Margaret Street site, even for the technical college alone, became apparent and in recent years development has concentrated on other sites in Toowoomba. As a result, the context of the Margaret Street site is still clear and is not obstructed by later buildings.

== Description ==
The Toowoomba Technical College is located on the corner of Margaret and Hume Streets Toowoomba. The building occupies a prominent position in the towns centre. It is situated opposite Queens Park and marks the eastern entrance to the Toowoomba township.

The Toowoomba Technical College Building, Block A, is a two-storey brick structure, relieved with sandstone dressings and some stucco, such as the pebble-dash balustrades marking the colonnade facing Margaret Street. All natural stone dressings are painted and the face brickwork has been coated with a clear finish. The eastern end of the north wing is equipped with saw tooth skylights facing south .

The building has an L-shaped floor plan, with an internal staircase located approximately centrally on each wing. Many of the rooms still function as classrooms and fittings such as blackboards have been retained. Both floors of the college feature high ceilings with a "Ripple Iron" finish. This finish has also been used in the two brick toilet blocks that were built at the same time.

A number of temporary internal walls have been installed on levels 1 and 2 to create office space and additional classrooms and a kitchen has been installed in what was once the clerks office on level 1 and the commercial room on level 2.

Apart from Block A, the other buildings on the site include two brick toilet blocks contemporary with the main building though partially altered; a timber building from 1913, now shifted and elevated (Block B); a brick classroom/workshop built in 1931 (Block D); and a temporary wooden building, built in 1955 (Block C). Apart from the toilet blocks, the later additions are substantially different in style and form to the original building (Block A).

== Heritage listing ==
Toowoomba Technical College (former) was listed on the Queensland Heritage Register on 21 October 1992 having satisfied the following criteria.

The place is important in demonstrating the evolution or pattern of Queensland's history.

The former Toowoomba Technical College was built in 1911 and holds a special association with the establishment of vocational education in regional Queensland and the development of Toowoomba as a regional centre.

The development of a purpose built Technical College in Toowoomba is associated with the formation of a branch of the Department of Public Instruction in 1905, established to centralise the control of technical education. With the intervention of the Government, funding improved and a number of new purpose-designed buildings were constructed, including the Toowoomba Technical College in 1911.

The place is important in demonstrating the principal characteristics of a particular class of cultural places.

The overall style and form of the building is also a good example of the style of educational facilities that government architect's were producing at the time.

The place is important because of its aesthetic significance.

The building holds a prominent position in the town, marking the eastern entrance to the central city area and is similar in style and form to a number of other Government buildings in the Toowoomba township.

The place has a strong or special association with a particular community or cultural group for social, cultural or spiritual reasons.

The former Toowoomba Technical College holds a special association with the establishment of vocational education in regional Queensland.

The place has a special association with the life or work of a particular person, group or organisation of importance in Queensland's history.

Designed by Thomas Pye, architect for the Department of Public Works and built by Alexander Mayes, Mayor of Toowoomba from 1916 to 1917.
