= Unara =

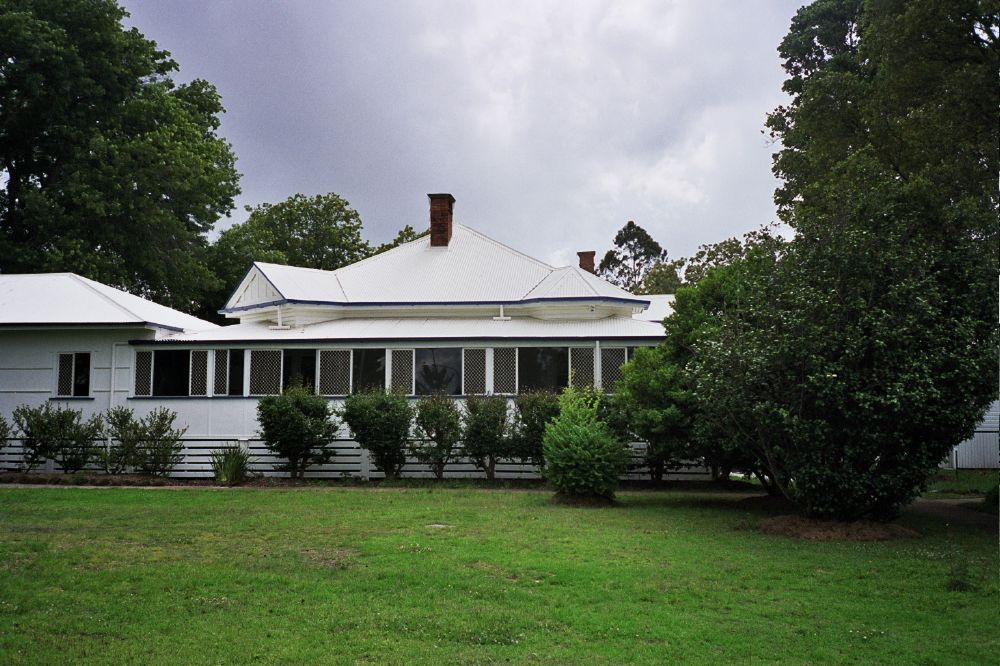
- Unara, 2005

- Location within Queensland Location within Australia
- 27.5651°S 151.9749°E
- Location: 9–13 Tourist Road, East Toowoomba, Toowoomba, Toowoomba Region, Queensland, Australia

History
- Design period: 1900–1914 (early 20th century)
- Built: c. 1906

Queensland Heritage Register
- Official name: Unara, Unara Community Health Centre
- Type: state heritage (built)
- Designated: 24 March 2000
- Reference no.: 602177
- Significant period: c. 1906, 1954, 1962 (fabric); 1900s–1970s (historical, social)
- Significant components: slab/s – concrete, laundry / wash house, trees/plantings

Unara is a heritage-listed detached house at 9–13 Tourist Road, East Toowoomba, Toowoomba, Toowoomba Region, Queensland, Australia. It was built c. 1906. It is also known as Unara Community Health Centre. It was added to the Queensland Heritage Register on 24 March 2000.

== History ==
Unara is a substantial timber residence built in c.1906 for Sir Littleton Groom and prominently located at the top of the Range on Tourist Road near the junction of the Warrego Highway.

Groom acquired the site on the edge of the Toowoomba Range overlooking the Lockyer Valley in 1904 and named the property Unara. The planning of the house was typical of the period, with a central hallway providing access to the principal rooms including a drawing room, study, dining room and bedrooms. The kitchen, pantry and servants quarters were located in a rear wing. A verandah surrounded the front section of the building. The main entrance, with a projecting gable roof, was situated on the northern side of the building.

When the residence was built for Groom, he was a prominent figure on the Darling Downs. He was born in Toowoomba on 22 April 1867, son of William Henry Groom, who had various political offices including Mayor of Toowoomba and member of the Legislative Assembly. Henry Groom won the seat of Darling Downs in the first Commonwealth Parliament but died soon after taking office. Littleton Groom took over his father's seat in a by-election and held it until his death in 1936 with the exception of the period 1929–32. Prior to entering Parliament, Littleton Groom practised as a lawyer, having studied arts and law at Melbourne University. He was admitted to the Queensland Bar in 1891. During his time in Federal Parliament Groom held various portfolios including attorney-general, home affairs, trade and customs and external affairs. He was knighted in 1924 and Groom served as Speaker of the House of Representatives from 1926 to 1929.

Following Groom's death in 1936 the residence was vacated by his wife and rented. It was later sold and converted into a guest house. In December 1945 the Division of Maternal and Child Health in the Department of Health purchased the property for £7682 for use as a Mothercraft Home. Similar homes were established during the 1940s at Clayfield, Sandgate, Ipswich and Rockhampton. These homes were intended to provide care for premature babies and for mothers requiring more intensive assistance in caring for infants.

Additions and alterations were undertaken to suit the new use. Many of the internal walls were sheeted with hardboard. The ceilings were also sheeted with the exception of the principal rooms which had pressed metal ceilings. In 1954 a wing was erected on the northern side of the building for staff quarters. This wing was completed for a cost of £12,000. Another wing with nine rooms was erected on the southern side in 1962. A new laundry and workshop was constructed in 1974. The mothercraft Home was closed in 1977 and the buildings were utilised as office accommodation by other divisions of the Health Department. The property was fully occupied and demand for additional accommodation resulted in the erection of a demountable block in 1986 at the rear of the site. The property was occupied by a variety of community health and allied health services until 1999 when the building was vacated.

The grounds are landscaped with mature shrubs, trees and hedges, lawn and pathways. It is probable that the pattern of landscaping, particularly the mature trees, date from the Groom period.

== Description ==
Unara is a large, low-set timber residence constructed in 1906, that has elements of the Federation Bungalow style and is now part of a larger complex of buildings. The former residence has two wings added, a northern wing in 1954 and a southern wing in 1962, and an extension to the kitchen wing at the back. Until recently there was also a brick building that was constructed in 1974 but has now been demolished and only the floorslab remains. There is also a separate laundry and workshop building.

The original planning of the house is substantially intact and later additions are clearly articulated. Verandahs on the north and east have been enclosed and the building is entered from a doorway on the north-eastern elevation. Many of the rooms have been lined with hardboard and fibro. Several large, well proportioned rooms with high ceilings have elements of original fabric remaining, these include pressed metal ceilings, leadlight windows, tiled fireplaces and other decorative elements. There are original doors throughout, these are generally four panel doors with Art Nouveau style finger plates and lock furniture. There are a number of styles of windows, including many timber sash windows and a variety of recent styles such as sliding and casement windows.

Basins have been added in a number of the rooms, along with built-in cupboards and some new partitions. Two kitchens have been added and are generally equipped with basic timber joinery and stainless steel benches.

The exterior of the building is characterised by the large multi-gabled roof clad in corrugated steel with projecting gable ends with timber and roughcast infill and cupola-like corner treatment. There are also a number of large bay windows, one of which has multi-paned coloured glass windows. There are three red brick chimneys with high level square openings. The verandahs have been enclosed with fibro, however, the rest of the building is clad in chamferboards. The house is set on concrete stumps and is accessed via timber stairs. The stair on the northern elevation appears to be the original entry stair and has a timber balustrade and handrail. A concrete path leads from the entry gate on Tourist Road to these stairs and then along the eastern side of the house and 1954 wing.

Vehicle access to the site is provided on the southern end of the site and a large expanse of gravel driveway occupies this end of the site. Also on this side of the site are mature trees including a Kauri Pine and other pines and a Liquid Amber. Along the Eastern elevation is a tall camellia hedge and two large camellia shrubs flank the entry path. At the rear of the site are a large Magnolia tree, oak tree, long leaf pine and a timber tank stand covered with wisteria.

== Heritage listing ==
Unara was listed on the Queensland Heritage Register on 24 March 2000 having satisfied the following criteria.

The place is important in demonstrating the evolution or pattern of Queensland's history.

Unara, a substantial timber residence built in c.1906 is significant for its strong association with Sir Littleton Groom who was a prominent figure in the Darling Downs for more than 30 years. For many years, he was the most senior Queensland conservative politician in the Commonwealth Parliament during its first decades and was well known at both state and federal level. Unara is important in demonstrating the development of Toowoomba and in particular the desirability of the Range as a location for the residences of prominent and affluent citizens of the city.

The place is important because of its aesthetic significance.

Unara has aesthetic significance which derives from its pleasing design and setting within a large garden with mature trees, hedges, lawn and shrubs.

The place has a strong or special association with a particular community or cultural group for social, cultural or spiritual reasons.

The significance of Unara and its association with Sir Littleton Groom is enhanced by its location in the city and in relation to the Groom Memorial immediately opposite the property in a small park at the junction of the Warrego Highway and Tourist Road.
