= East Toowoomba =

- Suburb
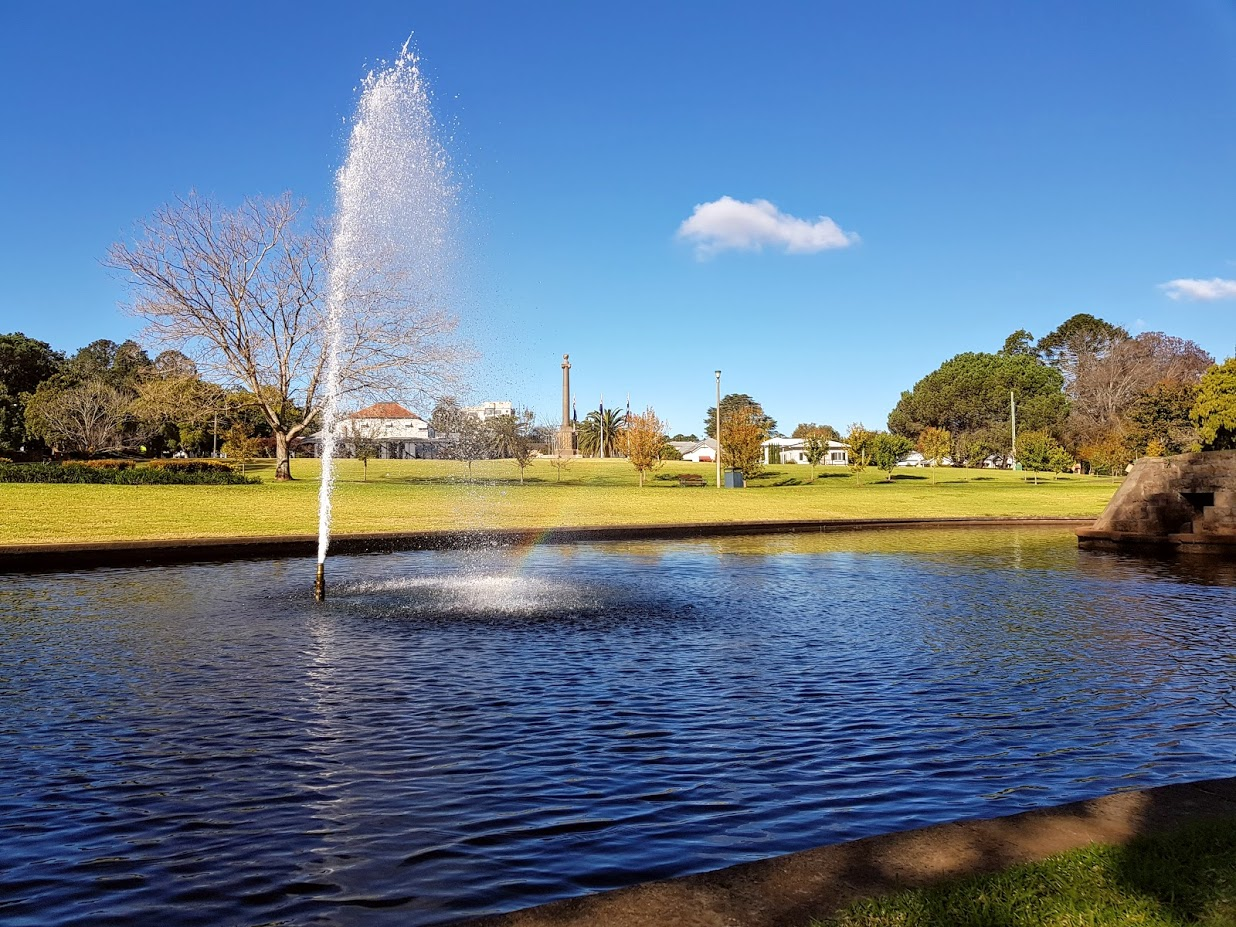
- Mothers' Memorial Park

- Interactive map of East Toowoomba
- Coordinates: 27.5622°S 151.9688°E
- Country: Australia
- State: Queensland
- City: Toowoomba
- LGA: Toowoomba Region
- Location: 1.5 km (0.93 mi) E of Toowoomba CBD; 125 km (78 mi) W of Brisbane

Government
  - State electorate: Toowoomba North
  - Federal division: Groom

Area
  - Total: 4.0 km^{2} (1.5 sq mi)

Population
  - Total: 5,953 (2021 census)
  - Density: 1,488/km^{2} (3,850/sq mi)
- Time zone: UTC+10:00 (AEST)
- Postcode: 4350
Suburbs around East Toowoomba
North Toowoomba	Mount Lofty	Prince Henry Heights
Toowoomba City	East Toowoomba	Redwood
South Toowoomba	Rangeville	Rangeville

East Toowoomba is a residential locality in Toowoomba in the Toowoomba Region, Queensland, Australia. In the 2021 census, East Toowoomba had a population of 5,953 people.

== Geography ==
East Toowoomba is 1.5 kilometres (0.93 mi) by road from the Toowoomba central business district. The east and south of the suburb is crossed by the Warrego Highway.

== History ==
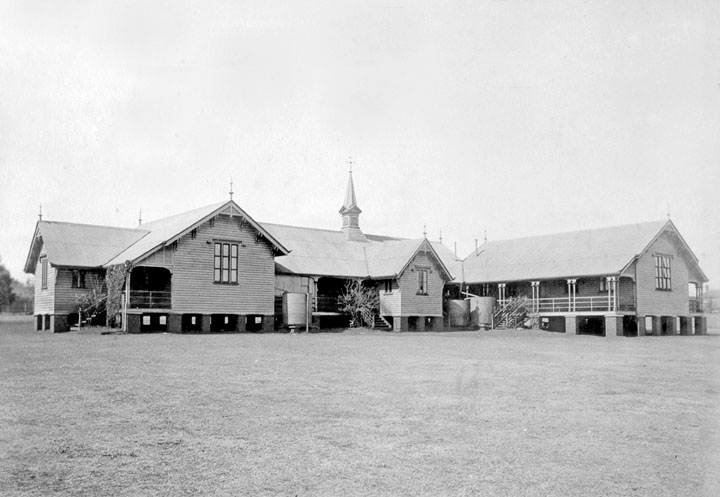
Toowoomba East State School, circa 1890

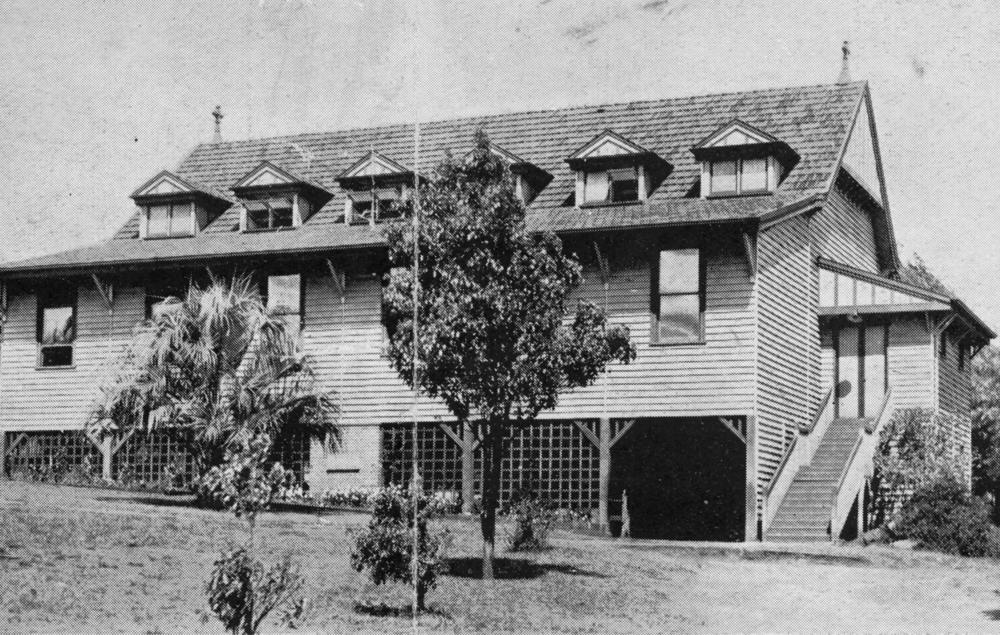
Holy Angels School, 1932

Toowoomba Grammar School opened on 1 February 1877.

Toowoomba East State School opened on 17 January 1887.

The Toowoomba Preparatory School opened on 31 January 1911. It is now known as Toowoomba Anglican College.

Fairholme College opened on 1 July 1917 in East Toowoomba. The school commenced on 4 February 1908 as Spreydon College in the now-heritage listed Spreydon house in Newtown. Under the patronage of the Presbyterian Church, the school became The Presbyterian Ladies' College in January 1915. The primary school moved to the house Fairholme in East Toowoomba in July 1917 with the secondary school following in 1918. Since then the school became unofficially known as Fairholme College, but the name Fairholme College did not become official until 1978.

On Sunday 9 September 1917, the foundation stone for the Holy Angels Catholic School was laid by Archbishop James Duhig. Duhig returned on Sunday 28 January 1918 to officially open the new school. It was operated by the Sisters of the Good Samaritan. It was renamed Mater Dei Catholic Primary School in 1955.

== Demographics ==
In the 2016 census, East Toowoomba had a population of 5,244 people.

- Aboriginal and Torres Strait Islander people made up 2.7% of the population.
- 80.1% of people were born in Australia. The next most common country of birth was England at 2.6%.
- 86.6% of people spoke only English at home..
- The most common responses for religion were No Religion 25.7%, Catholic 23.6% and Anglican 18.9%.

In the 2021 census, East Toowoomba had a population of 5,953 people.

== Heritage listings ==
There are a number of heritage-listed sites in East Toowoomba, including:

- Whyembah (house), 80 Campbell Street
- Fernside (house), 4–6 Fernside Street
- Queens Park, 43–79 Lindsay Street
- Toowoomba Grammar School, 24–60 Margaret Street
- Bishop's House, 73 Margaret Street
- Old Toowoomba Court House, 90 Margaret Street
- Toowoomba Technical College, 124 Margaret Street
- Gowrie House, 112 Mary Street
- Toowoomba East State School, 115–127 Mary Street
- Millbrook (house), 9 Phillip Street
- Unara (house), 9–13 Tourist Road

== Education ==
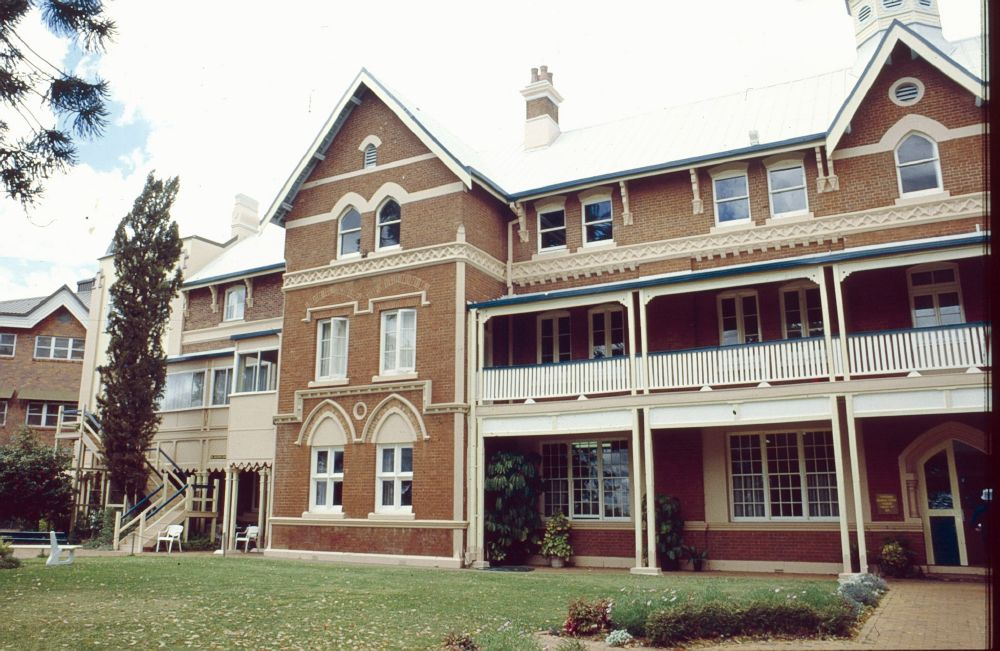
Toowoomba Grammar School, 1994

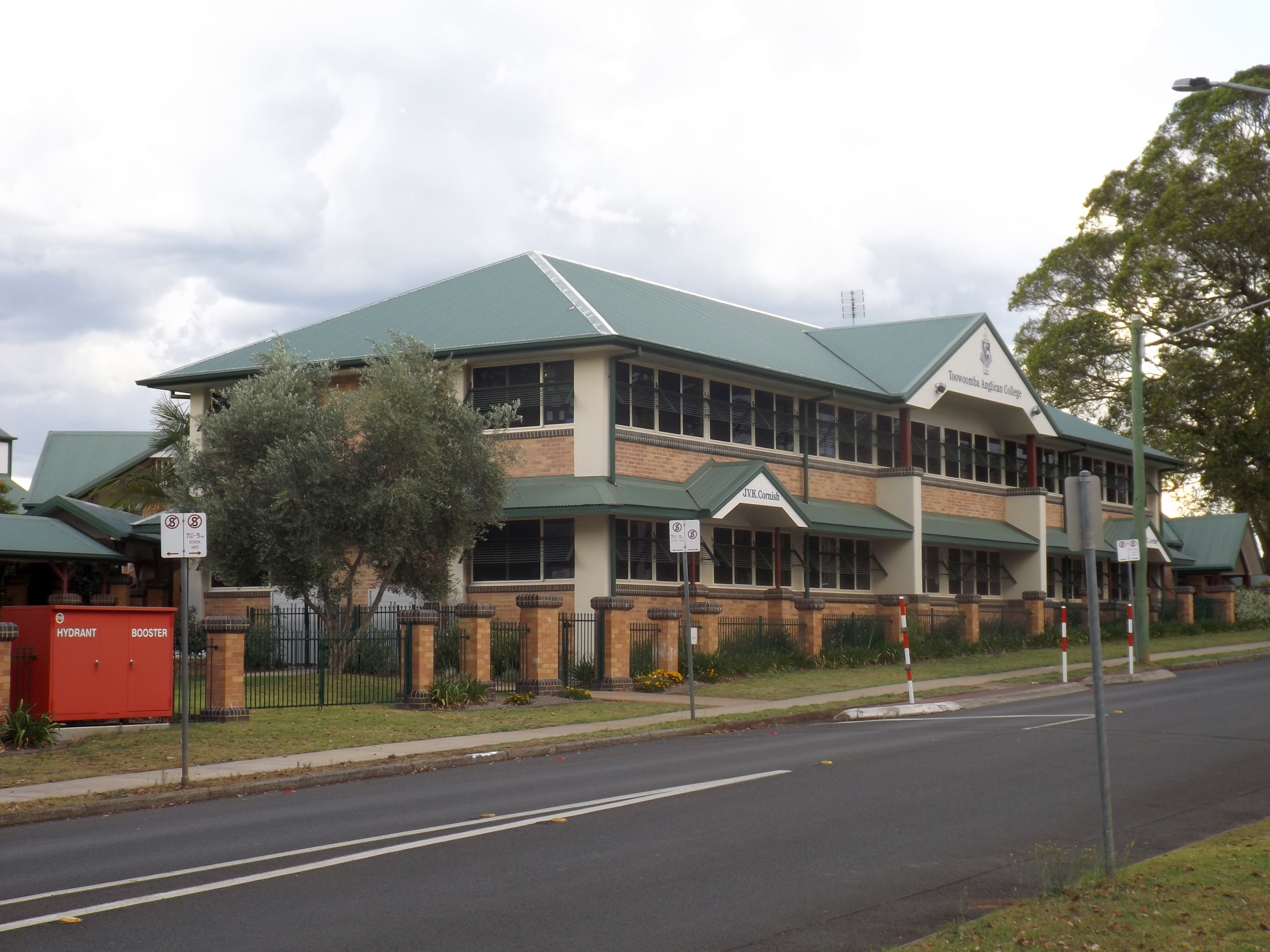
Toowoomba Anglican College, 2014

Toowoomba East State School is a government primary (Prep–6) school for boys and girls at 115–127 Mary Street (corner of Arthur Street, 27.5599°S 151.9659°E). In 2018, the school had an enrolment of 859 students with 60 teachers (51 full-time equivalent) and 25 non-teaching staff (17 full-time equivalent). It includes a special education program.

Mater Dei Primary School is a Catholic primary (Prep–6) school for boys and girls at 53 Curzon Street (27.5589°S 151.9738°E). In 2018, the school had an enrolment of 438 students with 34 teachers (26 full-time equivalent) and 20 non-teaching staff (11 full-time equivalent).

Toowoomba Grammar School is a private primary and secondary (Prep–12) school for boys at 24 Margaret Street (27.5631°S 151.9691°E). In 2018, the school had an enrolment of 1,176 students with 100 teachers (96 full-time equivalent) and 85 non-teaching staff (53 full-time equivalent).

Fairholme College is a private primary and secondary (Prep–12) school for girls at 40 Wirra Wirra Street (27.5553°S 151.9771°E). In 2018, the school had an enrolment of 686 students with 68 teachers (62 full-time equivalent) and 56 non-teaching staff (36 full-time equivalent).

Toowoomba Anglican School (formerly Toowoomba Anglican College and Preparatory School) is a private primary and secondary (Prep–12) school for boys and girls at 2 Campbell Street (27.5589°S 151.9762°E). In 2018, the school had an enrolment of 520 students with 46 teachers (38 full-time equivalent) and 35 non-teaching staff (24 full-time equivalent).

There are no government secondary schools in East Toowoomba. The nearest government secondary schools are Toowoomba State High School in neighbouring Mount Lofty to the north and Centenary Heights State High School in Centenary Heights to the south.

The suburb contains the main Bridge Street campus of Southern Queensland Institute of TAFE.

== Facilities ==
- Clive Berghofer Stadium, previously known as Athletic Oval and named for former Toowoomba mayor Clive Berghofer (1982–1992), and primarily used for rugby league games. It is also the home ground for South West Queensland Thunder FC who compete in the National Premier Leagues Queensland;
- St Vincent's Hospital, a private hospital established in 1922 by the Sisters of Charity;
- Queens Park and Botanical Gardens, a heritage-listed reserve established in 1869. Queens Park is the hub of Carnival of the Flowers (Toowoomba), including the Food and Wine festival, a Sideshow Alley and the finishing point for the Carnival Parade.
- Cobb & Co Museum, located on Lindsay Street in between Toowoomba TAFE and Queens Park.
