= Old Toowoomba Court House =

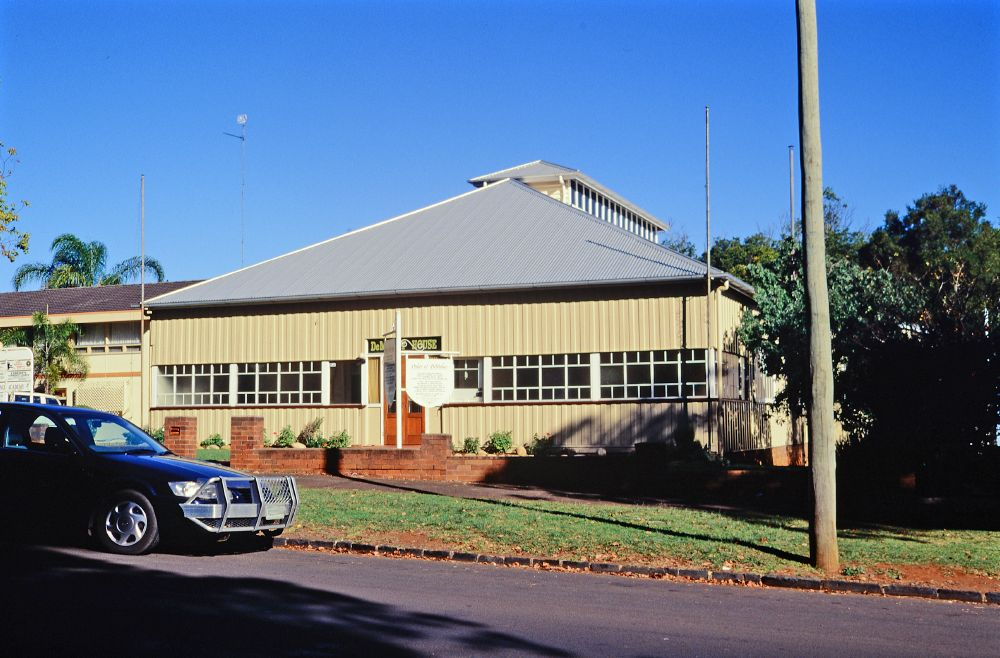
- Old Toowoomba Court House, 2000

- Location within Queensland Location within Australia
- 27.5629°S 151.9624°E
- Location: 90 Margaret Street, East Toowoomba, Toowoomba, Toowoomba Region, Queensland, Australia

History
- Design period: 1840s–1860s (mid-19th century)
- Built: 1861–1864

Queensland Heritage Register
- Official name: Toowoomba Court House & Old Toowoomba Gaol Wall (former), Austral Museum, De Molay House, Toowoomba Courthouse
- Type: state heritage (archaeological, built)
- Designated: 30 June 2001
- Reference no.: 601315
- Significant period: 1860s, 1880s (historical); 1860s, 1880s (fabric)
- Significant components: court house, wall/s

Old Toowoomba Court House is a heritage-listed courthouse at 90 Margaret Street, East Toowoomba, Toowoomba, Toowoomba Region, Queensland, Australia. It was built from 1861 to 1864. It is also known as Old Toowoomba Gaol Wall, Austral Museum, and De Molay House. It was added to the Queensland Heritage Register on 30 June 2001.

== History ==
The central brick rectangular core of the former Courthouse was constructed as the first Toowoomba courthouse between 1861 and 1863. The section is a two-storey with a hip roof with clerestory. In front of this is a symmetrical closed-in veranda which also has a steeply pitched corrugated iron hip roof. A small single-storey cottage is located at the rear of the hall. The complex has been added to and modified to serve as a female reformatory, museum, boarding house and community hall. The external boundary wall of the Toowoomba Men's Gaol was constructed using local stone and bricks on government land behind the courthouse in 1864.

Drayton was surveyed as a town in 1849 and it was there that the assizes for the district were held, and the first courthouse in the area was located. While "The Swamp", as Toowoomba was first called, was surveyed as an agricultural area, it soon proved more suitable for urban living and underwent rapid growth. In 1859 Judge Alfred Lutwyche found the Drayton Courthouse so dilapidated that he declined to use it. The Colonial Architect designed a new courthouse that cost £2,018/6/4 in Margaret Street, the road linking Brisbane to Toowoomba. Work commenced in 1861 and the building was opened in January 1863. This courthouse was low-set with a hip roof, rectangular in plan with a small entrance porch and had an internal U-shaped verandah. One chimney provided a back-to-back fireplace for the Magistrate and Clerk's rooms. A new courthouse, nearer the town centre, was built between 1876 and 1878.

When Toowoomba became an assize town there was a need for a gaol to house criminals arrested on the Darling Downs, the Maranoa and Warrego awaiting trial and for those convicted. The Queensland Colonial Architect's plans for the new gaol to be erected behind the courthouse were completed by 12 February 1862. Godfrey and Johnstone started work on Toowoomba's new gaol in early 1863. By June 1864 the building was ready for occupation except for the completion of the boundary wall and its gateway, this was completed by September 1864. This external wall had a buttressed footings of roughly dressed stone about a foot each in dimension, upon which was built an unrendered brick wall two bricks deep, or about nineteen inches; similar dimension to the Administration Building erected at St Helena Gaol in 1886. The wall was about 12 feet (3.7 m) high, with tapered buttresses that stop halfway up the wall, and a sloped coping made of bricks.

In 1870, due to overcrowding of women prisoners in Brisbane and removal of male prisoners to St Helena, all female prisoners in Queensland were incarcerated in the former Toowoomba men's gaol. As there was no provision within the gaol for juvenile female offenders, in 1882 the government employed J Nock contractor to convert the old Toowoomba courthouse to a female reformatory. This work cost £993 and included adding the clerestory to provide more natural lighting, partitioning parts of the verandah to make a section with hand basins, office and storage room, and building a small detached hospital.

An article on the Toowoomba Reformatory published in the Darling Downs Gazette of 25 February 1889 described the building as verandahed and spacious. It had a large detached kitchen with adjoining laundry. Off the dining room was a schoolroom that seated 22 girls and surrounding these two rooms were compartments with beds and shelves. The place had a bathroom and lavatory. Two cells or "darkrooms" used for serious offenders were located under the rear of the building. Girls some as young as 4 or 5 were lodged in the reformatory, which was outside the gaol in its own fenced enclosure, and separated from it by a lane. Ten large tanks formerly at St Helena's provide water for the residents and laundry needs. The Victorian attitude required that these females work and the well appointed laundry with 7 or 8 big galvanised tanks was used by many local families for their washing and provided the institution with £12 to £13 a month.

After the new Female Division at Boggo Road Gaol opened on 3 October 1903 all Toowoomba female prisoners were transferred to Brisbane and the reformatory outside the gaol walls was also closed. According to the 1903 Post of Directories it was known as the Girls Industrial School.

Poet George Essex Evans inspired by the 1903 Maryborough eisteddfod enthused enterprising Toowoomba residents into developing a similar festival and initiated the creating of a cultural organisation that aimed at developing Toowoomba as the leading centre of music, art and literature. Prominent men soon formed a committee and the inaugural Austral Festival, held in the town hall in November 1904, was a resounding success. Albert Edward Harston, a music school proprietor, suggested purchasing the old gaol site for future festivals. Members of the committee formed the Austral Finance Company to purchase the site; as this involved closing part of Austral Lane they did not become the registered owners until 1909. The Austral Finance Company employed architect William Hodgen to design a hall that could seat thousands and they utilised the former reformatory building as a museum. While many of the gaol buildings were demolished, Hodgen's design utilised the massive stone-rubble external gaol wall to form two of the walls of this vast hall; hence the hall only cost £1,495 to construct. The complex became the Austral Association Hall and Museum.

Austral Museum opened in 1904. Exhibits included a donated collection of South Sea Islander artifacts, collection of polished samples of timber from Filshie Broadfoot & Marks and samples of all soils to be found in Queensland.

Various reasons such as the death of George Essex Evans, an established Toowoomba poet and enthusiastic supporter, during the 1909 festival and death of the King whose birthday the festival celebrated led to the decline in the annual event, with the last festival held in 1911.

Early in 1916 Albert Edward Harston, an active and founding member of the Austral Association, purchased the site. About 1919 he subdivided the site into three land parcels. The former museum subsequently operated as a private hospital under Nurse Curtis for a few years before becoming a boarding house in the early 1920s. Rutlands was the Thompson sister's guesthouse from about 1930 to 1960. An advertisement in a booklet published by the Toowoomba Tourist Board in 1935 claimed it was a recently refurbished mansion that offered every home comfort, first-class cuisine, internal sanitation with hot and cold water, good garden and garage. The Toowoomba Chronicle of 7 April 1960 stated that Miss Thompson made $5,500 when she sold the 19-room guesthouse to the Toowoomba DeMolay Chapter.

The DeMolay Order founded in 1919 at Kansas City was initially based on Masonic ritual. It gradually spread through American and grew into an international organisation. This non-denominational, non-political society for males 12 to 21 year olds fosters public speaking, leadership, competitive sporting activities, community involvement and family commitment. Like Scouts and other youth organisations they hold annual conferences, however, a mothers group is an important aspect of the society and volunteer work such as raising funds for charities like the Blue Nurses and visiting the elderly is encouraged. After leaving the order most of the young men join service groups such as Lions and Rotary.

An article about DeMolay celebrating its 21st birthday in The Chronicle of 3 October 1978 included a photograph of Rutlands and DeMolay House. The photograph shows that Rutlands' front verandah was closed-in on the right but on the left of the central opening was open and the verandah edged with a two-rail slat balustrade. The Chronicle of 13 May 1983 reported that Toowoomba's DeMolay Chapter was in urgent need of funds for refurbishing their building, which had been in a run down state when purchased in 1960. While maintenance work on the foundation had been completed and some flooring replaced, they needed to re-roof the building. The original core "measures 20 metres by 10 metres and has brick walls 35 centimetres thick".

According to a long time member of the organisation when DeMolay purchased Rutlands, the hall had a central passage with partitioned rooms off either side of it, these were removed. Many of the bathroom fittings have been replaced but some still have their original cast-iron pipes. Other changes include closing-in the front verandah and verandahs on the caretaker's cottage. Original roof shingles were found when the roof was recently replaced. The site does have archaeological evidence of earlier uses; while fixing floorboards they discovered various artifacts such as shoes and a little girls dress. When excavating prior to laying the concrete for the caretaker's carport in the back yard, they located the old laundry.

The Toowoomba Chapter is unusual; they are the only Order in Australia and only branch in the world to own their building. Because the order is run as a self-supporting business they rent the hall to various local organisations to raise revenue for maintaining the building and financing activities.

Long gone is the reformatory's 1882 detached kitchen with large laundry that was erected between the main building and gaol wall. It is not known when the front verandah or extension was added to the rear southwestern corner.

Of the old gaol the only visible remains are part of the external wall. Most of the bricks that topped the wall have disappeared though it is said that some were used in the construction of the Boer War Memorial gateway to the Mothers' Memorial, now located in War Memorial Park, Margaret Street. Some stone blocks were missing from the top course, and others had fallen and lie at the foot of the wall. However, the top course has been carefully repaired during the course of the recent building works on the site, and the wall no longer has missing stones nor fallen stones at its base. A flight of concrete steps, constructed in the mid-twentieth century, are set in the west part of the wall, leading to a flat concrete pad inside the wall. While much of the gaol was demolished, foundations for some of the buildings are still extant a great deal of archaeological evidence still exists below ground level, in the form of foundations.

A motel and a 1998 a townhouse development has been built on the former prison area. While most of the site had been built over, much of the north-south and east-west parts of the old gaol boundary wall are still evident.

== Description ==
The place consists of the former Courthouse and the Old Toowoomba Gaol Wall.

=== The former Courthouse ===
The former Courthouse is a large low-set hipped-roof hall close to the street at 90 Margaret Street, Toowoomba. It is composed of several sections. The core is rectangular in plan, and the English bond brick two-storey structure is capped by a hip roof with clerestory. The front is a hip-roofed closed-in verandah. On the rear southwestern corner is a timber extension and off the core on the southeastern corner is the small hip-roofed caretaker's cottage.

Facing Margaret Street is the closed in verandah with centered French door main entrance. The name of the building "DeMOLAY HOUSE" is above this central entrance. The eastern elevation is composed of three parts. A long sunshade supported by brackets extends over the ground floor windows of the building core. Above these windows are smaller windows close to the eaves that provide lighting for the upper level. Near where a passage links the main building to the cottage is the sole brick chimney. The cottage is a low-set two-room brick building with closed-in verandahs. The third part is the closed-in front verandah. The western elevation is close to the fence line and has a small extension at the rear.

The former Courthouse is set close to the mature camphor laurel lined Margaret Street and opposite Queens Park and adds to the streetscape of this important thoroughfare connecting Brisbane and Toowoomba.

Narrow Austral Lane terminates at the rear of the place. The core building has a rough stubble subfloor. A modern carport with concrete floor abuts the rear of the core and caretakers cottage. The large expanse of land is uneven but does include mature trees. A remnant of the old prison wall forms part of the rear boundary.

=== Old Toowoomba Gaol Wall ===
Part of the stone of the external perimeter of the Toowoomba Gaol constructed in 1864 is still extant. Constructed of courses of blocks of a conglomerate rock, set in a finely divided sand and lime mortar. The rock appears to be made up of ironstone nodules set firmly in a sedimentary matrix, it is a dark oxidised colour throughout. This two feet thick wall is two blocks deep and, is without a rubble core.

A north-south section that meets an east-west section is still visible from Stirling Street. At about 6 feet (1.8 m), this Stirling Street corner is the highest point and there are on average five courses of blocks above ground level, varying in size from one to two feet in each dimension. The interior ground is level with the top of the wall and exterior ground level at street level. From this corner, the wall extends north towards and forms part of the boundary of the former Courthouse, while the eastern section acts as a retaining wall and eventually disappears under rising ground.

A block of townhouses have been constructed in Sterling Street, using the Old Toowoomba Gaol wall as part of the foundations of the site.

== Heritage listing ==
The Old Toowoomba Court House & Old Toowoomba Gaol Wall were listed on the Queensland Heritage Register on 30 June 2001 having satisfied the following criteria.

The place is important in demonstrating the evolution or pattern of Queensland's history.

The core of the former Toowoomba Courthouse, built by 1863, and the old Gaol wall (1864) are evidence of early government buildings of the colonial period and demonstrate the evolution and pattern of Queensland's history, in particular the development of Toowoomba as an important Darling Downs town. As does the Toowoomba residents wanting to develop cultural facilities who took the opportunity of the closure of the gaol in 1903 to acquire a large expanse of land to build a festival hall and open a museum. Cultural festivals, eisteddfod and museums were an important part of early twentieth century life. The former Courthouse, as a museum and community hall, has been an important building in Toowoomba's cultural scene.

Changes in prison philosophy and the need to house Queensland's juvenile female offenders led to modifications to the former Courthouse in 1882 for its use as a female reformatory. Internal modifications to adapt the building for usage as a museum, boarding house and community hall have not detracted from its external appearance and reflect the evolution of structures over time.

The former Courthouse is part of the Margaret Street precinct which has historic value for its association with early settlement as it was one of the town's main early thoroughfares.

The place demonstrates rare, uncommon or endangered aspects of Queensland's cultural heritage.

The core of the former Courthouse is a rare surviving example of an early colonial courthouse while the extant parts of the old Toowoomba Gaol wall are rare remnants of an 1860s country gaol.

The place has potential to yield information that will contribute to an understanding of Queensland's history.

The former Courthouse's changes of usage from courthouse, reformatory, museum to boarding house and the remnants of the gaol wall and buildings have potential to yield information that will contribute to an understanding of Queensland's history.

The place is important because of its aesthetic significance.

The former Courthouse has aesthetic visual streetscape because of the mature camphor laurels, bluestone kerbs, Queens Park and many grand 19th century houses.

The place is important in demonstrating a high degree of creative or technical achievement at a particular period.

The survival of the wall demonstrates the a high degree of technical achievement for the 1860s.

The place has a special association with the life or work of a particular person, group or organisation of importance in Queensland's history.

The Toowoomba DeMolay Chapter is part of a worldwide organisation that aims to develop the potential and individuality of young males and they are the only Australian Chapter to possess their own building.
