= Queens Park, Toowoomba =

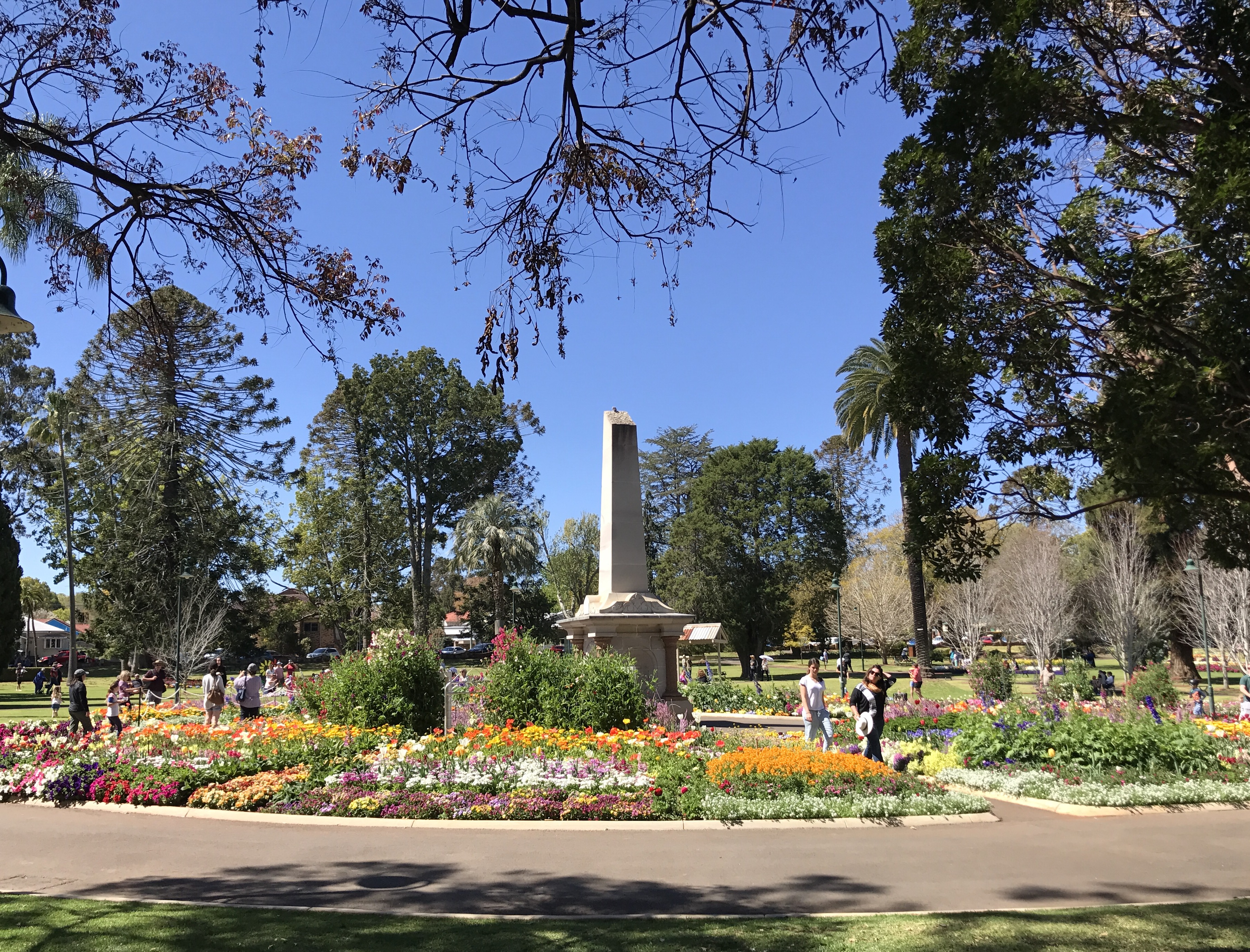
- Thomas Memorial

- Location within Queensland Location within Australia
- 27.5595°S 151.9613°E
- Location: 43–79 Lindsay Street, East Toowoomba, Toowoomba, Toowoomba Region, Queensland, Australia

History
- Design period: 1870s–1890s (late 19th century)
- Built: 1875–1970s

Queensland Heritage Register
- Official name: Toowoomba Queens Park and Botanic Gardens, Toowoomba Queen's Park
- Type: state heritage (landscape, built)
- Designated: 27 April 2001
- Reference no.: 601607
- Significant period: 1869, 1875 (historical); 1869–ongoing (social)
- Significant components: cannon, garden – bed/s, pathway/walkway, wall/s, sports field/oval/playing field, tree groups – avenue of, trees/plantings, memorial/monument

Queens Park is a heritage-listed botanic garden at 43–79 Lindsay Street, East Toowoomba, Toowoomba, Queensland, Toowoomba Region, Australia. It was built from 1875 to 1970s. It also contains the Toowoomba Botanic Gardens. It was added to the Queensland Heritage Register on 27 April 2001.

== History ==
The Queen's Park and Botanic Gardens, Toowoomba was gazetted as a public reserve in 1869. It was not until the mid-1870s that the Queens Park and Botanic Gardens were established as separate, but related, entities on this land. Queens Park was intended as a place of public recreation and the Botanic Gardens as a place for botanic research.

Urban public parks became a popular vehicle for 19th century movements concerned with public health - the park provided a place for the outdoor recreation of those unable to afford private gardens and improved the environment of crowded central city and town areas. Botanic Gardens were started as part of an increasing interest in scientific understanding of the natural world. A botanic gardens was established in Brisbane in 1855 in response to 19th century interest in botany which saw botanic gardens established around the world, particularly in those colonized areas of the world where little formal knowledge of the interaction between geography and botany existed. An integral part of the Brisbane Botanic Gardens was a series of branch gardens in provincial areas throughout Queensland which provided botanic data across the wide spectrum of Queensland ecosystems.

Soon after Toowoomba was proclaimed a municipality on 19 November 1860, William Henry Groom, an early Toowoomba mayor and later Member of the Queensland Legislative Assembly, lobbied the colonial government for an area of land for public recreation. A constant theme over Groom's long political career was his interest in the development of Toowoomba as a major centre and of the associated rural interests of the surrounding fertile farming area. In 1861 land was reserved for a Toowoomba recreation park but this was not the eventual site. By September 1869 the present site was surveyed and reserved for public reserve but many years were to elapse before any further progress was made of the layout or even rudimentary planting. The land chosen for the reserve was an L-shaped block bounded by streets that were to become Margaret, Lindsay, Hume, Godsall and Campbell Streets very near the centre of the growing town. Until further development of the site it was variously used to graze cattle and horses, and as a source of clay for bricks for use in government buildings. These uses left the park in poor condition with holes pitted throughout and in no way like the public parks on which it was modelled. Although initially the reserve was under the control of the Colonial Queensland Government, by the end of the 1860s the Toowoomba Council was vested with the control of all parks in the municipality. However it was not until 1892 that the council was formally vested with the title to the land, on the condition that the whole area remain a recreation ground and be used for no other purpose.

The development of the site, by now known as Queens' Park began with modest efforts - in 1873 the council was granted £200 for the development of Queens Park this was used for the construction of timber rail fencing. Fencing was a significant stage in the development of the park because it prohibited itinerant and destructive cattle and also allowed regulation of hours of opening. The council was also concerned with the draining of swamps throughout Toowoomba including swampy land on the western side of Queens Park.

Although it was not the stated intention of the Council at the establishment of Queen's Park to develop a Botanic Gardens in conjunction with the public recreation park, Groom successfully lobbied the colonial government for £500 in 1874 for this purpose. Under the direction of Brisbane Botanic Gardens curator, Walter Hill, the Brisbane Botanic Gardens was establishing branch gardens throughout Queensland. After Ipswich, the Toowoomba Botanic Gardens was the second of eight branch gardens established in Queensland during the 1870s. Very early correspondence on the establishment of the Gardens suggests that Walter Hill was instrumental in deciding on appropriate locations for these branch gardens and lobbying on behalf of the various councils to the Colonial Government for their establishment. Certainly, in making his case to the Government for funding, Walter Groom mentions that Walter Hill would 'lay out our Queens Park - and he would like a portion to be allotted to him for testing the climate of the Downs for the growth (of plants) "of commercial value". That part allotted to the Botanic Gardens was at the northern end of the site, in the small rectangular section forming one of the arms of the L-shaped block.

With the establishment of the Toowoomba Botanic Garden, a curator, Edward Way, was appointed and the gardens were well established in late 1875. The curator was essential to the success of the Botanic Gardens as a scientific research tool - Way was responsible for liaising with Walter Hill about the layout, planting projects and overseeing the construction of appropriate structures therein. The two local newspapers reported in October and November 1875 that the Queens Park and the Botanic Gardens had been lately improved with walks, borders, flower beds, nurseries of exotic trees, specimen grass plantings from the Acclimatization Society, and a bush house. The latter part of the 1870s saw the planting and testing of structure trees and fruit trees and in 1880 climatic experiments were carried out on the extant garden. Periodically trees were removed and replaced from the gardens to allow continual testing of various species and types, the results from these tests were published in local papers and forwarded to the Brisbane Botanic Gardens, thereby contributing to a rich volume of knowledge about Queensland botany.

With the Botanical Gardens well underway, it was time for the council to concentrate on the development of Queen's Park which was still pitted with holes and without vegetation. By 1881 the site was used by the Caledonian Sports Association as a sports field with the erection of a small grandstand, sports ring and running track. Many societies and clubs established sports fields on Queens Park throughout its life and to this day there are many sports fields associated with the park, particularly on that more open area at the western end. The levelling of the park in the 1930s as part of the relief scheme aided its more extensive use by sporting associations.

As well as sports fields, Queens Park was the home of municipal swimming baths from 1894 until 1964. The baths were first established on the southwest corner of the park, near the corner of Margaret and Hume Streets. As much as for public recreation, the establishment of the baths located in this position seems to have been part of a strategy to drain this area of what was known as the East Swamp of Toowoomba. In 1937, with the popular national swimming movement this baths were enlarged and upgraded. The baths were removed in 1964 and replaced with the Vera Lacaze Memorial Park, an interesting example of modernist landscape architecture in Queensland.

The development of the Botanic Gardens continued in the 1890s with the construction of several buildings, including a curator's cottage, kiosk, bandstand and, in 1900, a zoo on the southern boundary of the park. None of these buildings are extant. One of the more prominent avenues associated with the Park and Gardens is the camphor laurel avenue from Margaret Street to northwards to the Gardens. Although only parts of the avenue remain within the Gardens in 2000, it remains extant within the Park. This avenue was established by 1891. At about this time, the Alfred Thomas Memorial was relocated from the corner of Ruthven and Margaret Streets, to the centre of the circular part of the avenue, just inside the northern entrance to the Gardens off Campbell Street. Alfred Thomas supervised construction of the railway from Ipswich to Toowoomba, a major engineering feat. A cannon was sited near the memorial in 1900.

In the 1920s Toowoomba become known as the garden city of Queensland, in recognition of the extensive network of well established gardens which dotted the city. Of these, the Queen's Park and adjacent Botanic Gardens were the premier examples. By now a large iron framed glasshouse was featured in the gardens and the paths were gravelled. However Queens Park continued to be used as a garbage disposal until 1931 and leases for grazing horses were granted until the 1920s.

By the 1940s a children's playground had been erected in Queens Park, following the tradition of children's playgrounds set up around the state from the 1920s and developed to allow the proper recreation and exercise of children.

Development during the 1950s to the 1970s saw dramatic overhaul of the existing facilities within the park and the replacement of many of the earlier buildings. An amenities block was constructed in the gardens, the municipal baths were removed and replaced with a garden and toilet facilities. One of the most prominent changes that occurred during the 1970s was the replacement of the existing fence on the Lindsay and Campbell Street sides of the Botanic Gardens with a low sandstone footwall. As well the 19th century kiosk, conservatory/greenhouse, bush-house and bandstand were removed from the park.

== Description ==
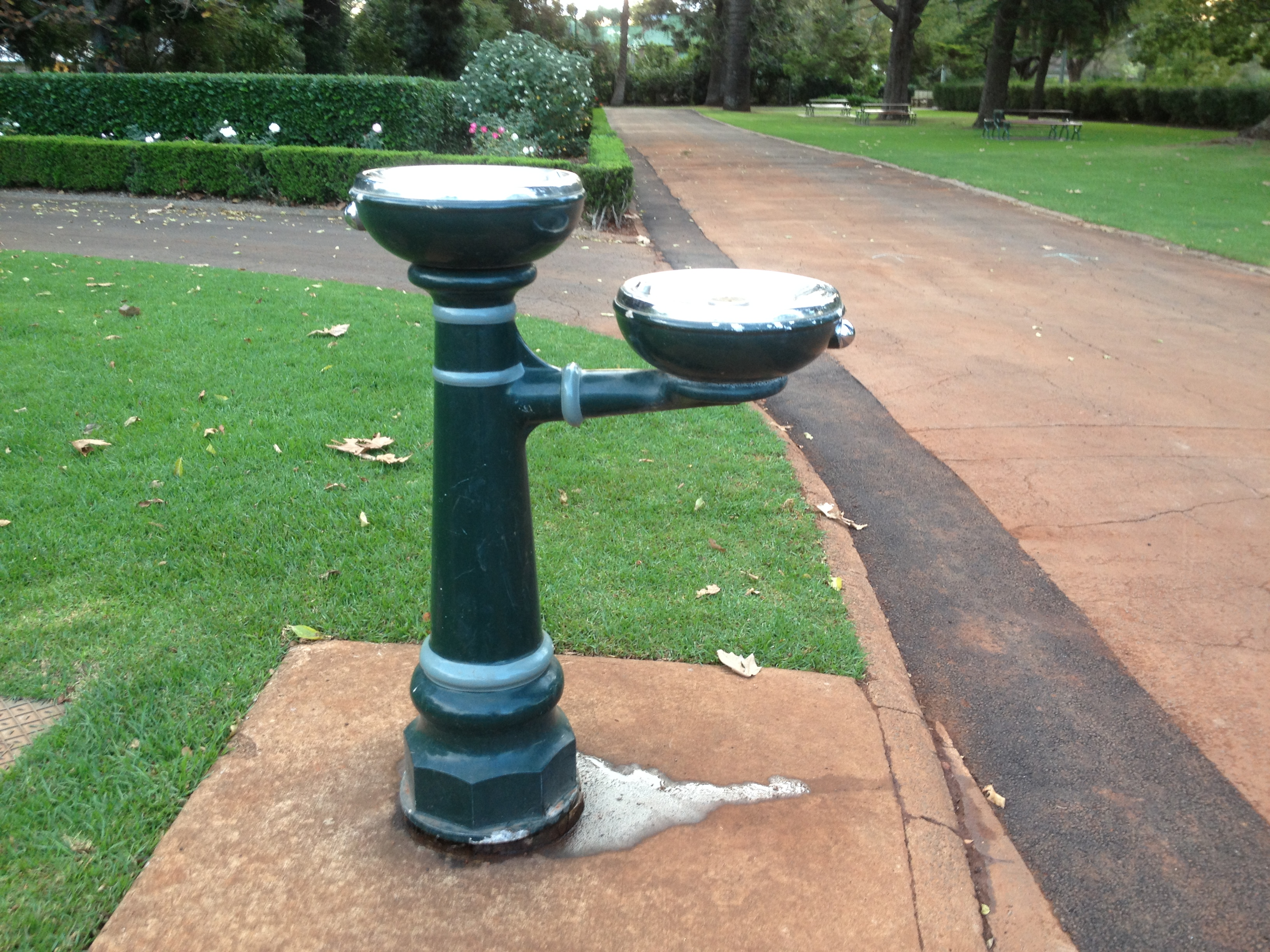
Park water fountain, 2014

The Toowoomba Queens Park and adjacent Botanic Gardens are located on a large open L-shaped site bounded by Margaret Street to the south, Hume Street to the west, Godsall and Campbell Streets to the north and Lindsay Street to the east. The part occupied by the Botanic Gardens is a small rectangular section of the L shape, extending north to Campbell Street from Godsall Street.

Substantial remnants of early planting remain within both the Gardens and the Park, most prominently the camphor laurel avenue traversing north south, from Margaret to Campbell Street and comprising a walkway bounded by mature camphor laurels. Many early single individual trees also remain, among them bottle trees, bunya pines, Chinese elm, cricket bat willow, English oak, Himalayan pine, jacaranda, Norfolk Island pine, plane trees, kauri pine, silky oak, silver maple and swamp cypress.

The Botanic Gardens is characterised by a more formal layout and planting, with large trees surrounded by garden beds in geometrical patterns, hedges and avenues. The focal point of the Gardens is the Thomas Memorial which sits in the middle of a large circular bedded area, more open than other areas of the Gardens. Adjacent to the Thomas Memorial in this area is a small cannon. Walks in the garden are gravelled and usually bordered by narrow flower beds.

The gardens are surrounded by a low masonry fence which is broken to form entrances. A large, recent entrance gate is found on the Lindsay Street boundary of the Gardens. This large structure is made from rubble sandstone and has 4 circular sandstone motifs, and an entablature with Toowoomba Botanic Gardens Est'd 1875. Just inside this gate is another recent addition, a doorway feature from a local demolished building, comprising two granite columns with ionic caps joined by a sandstone entablature. A new toilet block has been constructed within the grounds of the gardens.

Queens Park is a more open, less formally arranged space. The most apparent plantings are those forming the camphor laurel avenue from the Botanic Gardens and aligned with the Thomas Memorial and large established trees surrounding the eastern end and northern border of the Park. Several large playing fields are dotted over the Park and these are serviced by small one storeyed facilities buildings. In the south west corner of the park is a more formal area, known as the Vera Lacaze Gardens and containing a bridge between lawned mounds and toilet block. The park is more sparsely planted at this western end, which is closer to the Toowoomba CBD.

== Heritage listing ==
Toowoomba Queens Park and Botanic Gardens was listed on the Queensland Heritage Register on 27 April 2001 having satisfied the following criteria.

The place is important in demonstrating the evolution or pattern of Queensland's history.

The Toowoomba Queen's Park and adjacent Botanic Gardens is significant as a substantially intact 19th century public recreation reserve. The Botanic Gardens is important in demonstrating the introduction of scientific centres associated with the development of economic and ornamental botany, the knowledge of which benefited the colony.

The place is important in demonstrating the principal characteristics of a particular class of cultural places.

The Park and Garden demonstrate the principal characteristics of 19th century public parks and botanic gardens, with early planting, avenues, memorials and remnants of the early layout.

The place is important because of its aesthetic significance.

The Park and Gardens is significant for its considerable aesthetic value as a large urban park with both formal and informal section all planted with early and substantial trees. The Park and Gardens have individual items of particular aesthetic merit, including a camphor laurel avenue, other avenues and individual trees.

The place has a strong or special association with a particular community or cultural group for social, cultural or spiritual reasons.

The place has social significance as a long used and popular reserve for public recreation and as an early example of the history of the Queensland Government vesting local authorities with the maintenance and control of public reserves.

The place has a special association with the life or work of a particular person, group or organisation of importance in Queensland's history.

The park and garden feature a number of memorials and gardens, commemorating well known local citizens, these including the Thomas Memorial Vera Lacaze. The place has significance for its association with Walter Hill, on whose advice the Botanic Gardens was instigated and laid out, and who was instrumental in the development of the regional network of botanic gardens and thereby contributing to early knowledge of the intersection between botany and Queensland geography. The place has significance for its association with William Groom who as Mayor of Toowoomba for six years was closely associated with the establishment and ongoing development of Queen's Park and Gardens.

== Gallery ==
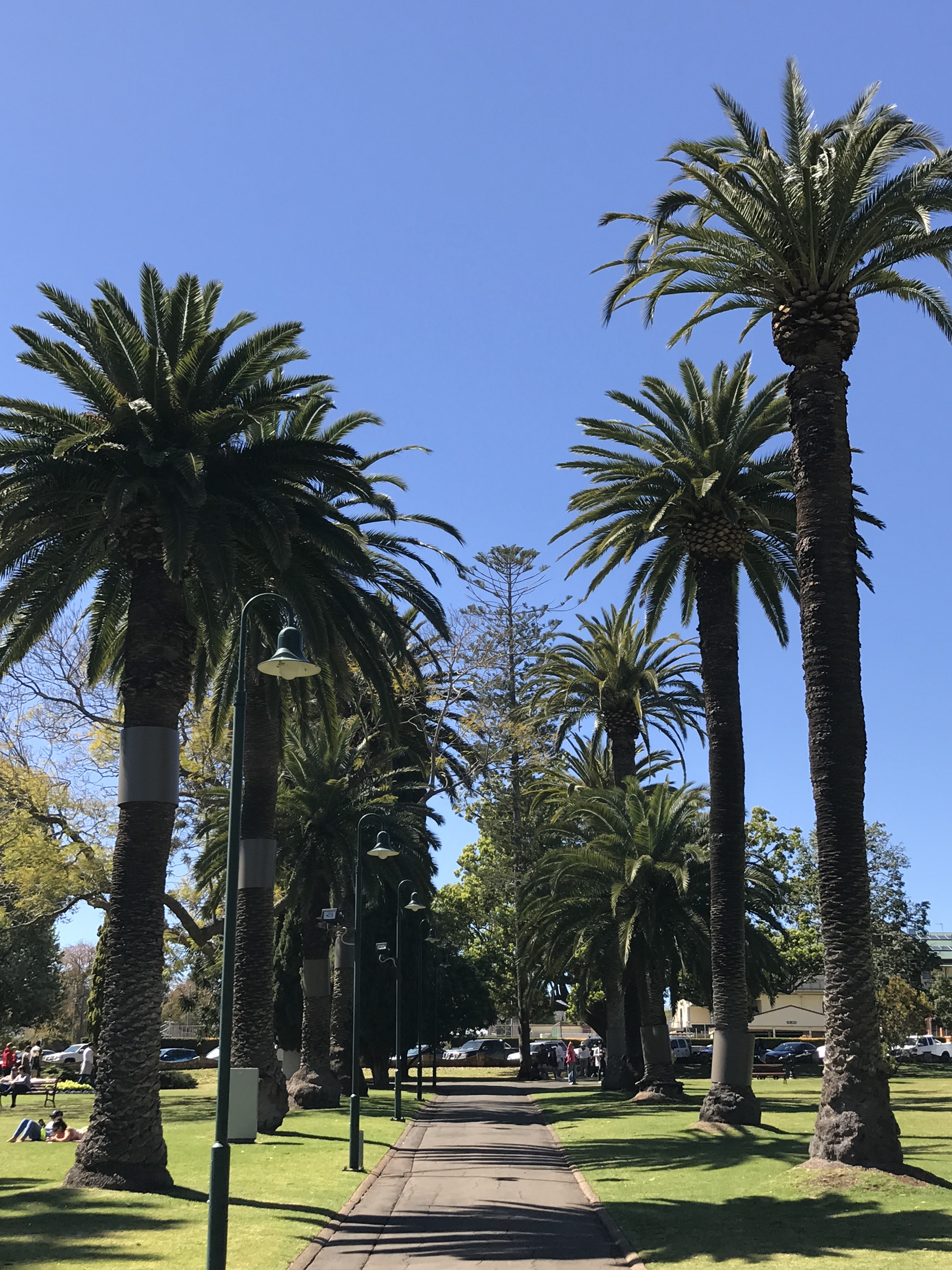
Queens Park Botanic Gardens 2017

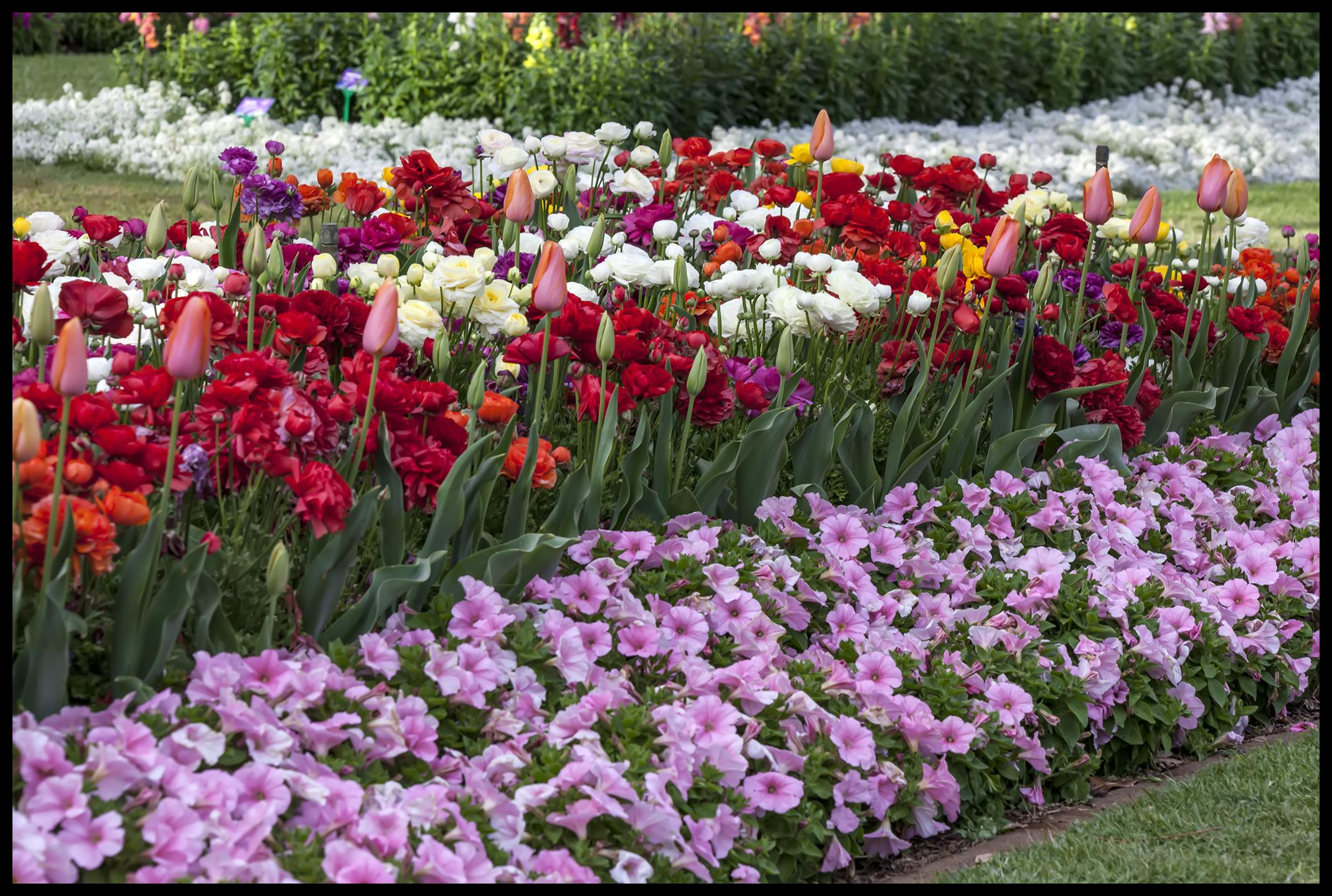
Flowers – Queens Park Botanic Gardens 2014

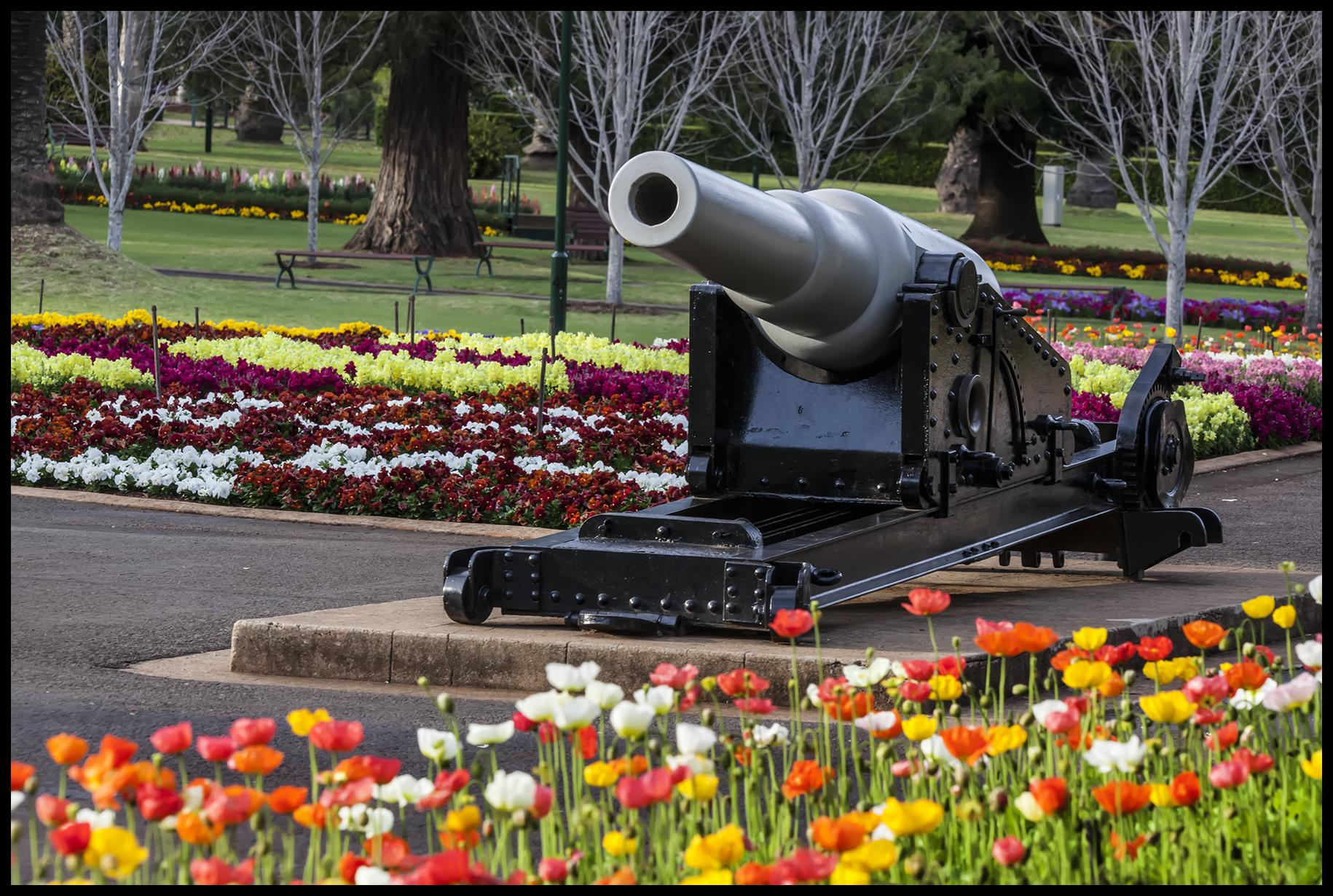
Memorial Cannon –Queens Park Botanic Gardens 2014

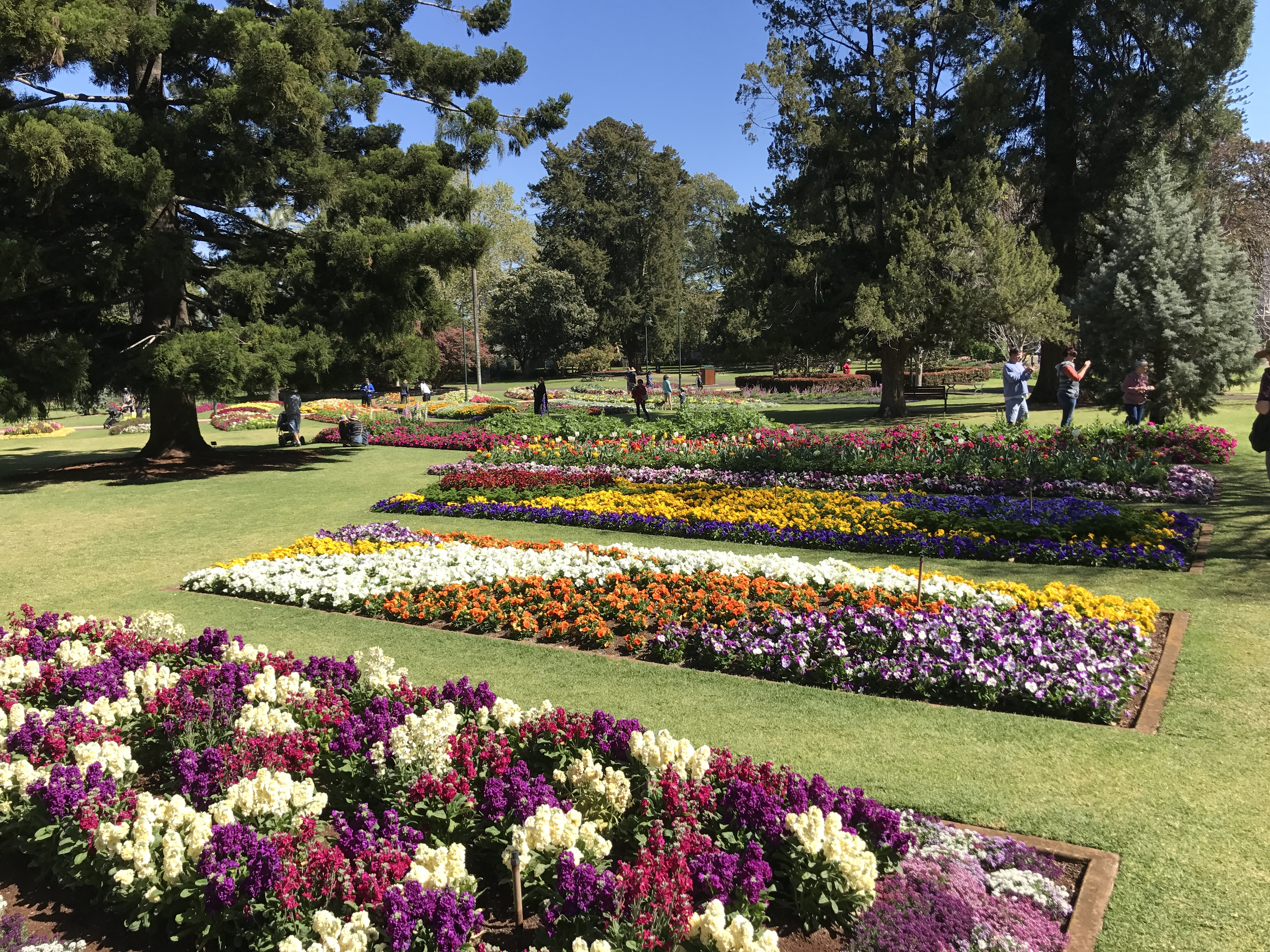
Flowers – Queens Park Botanic Gardens 2017

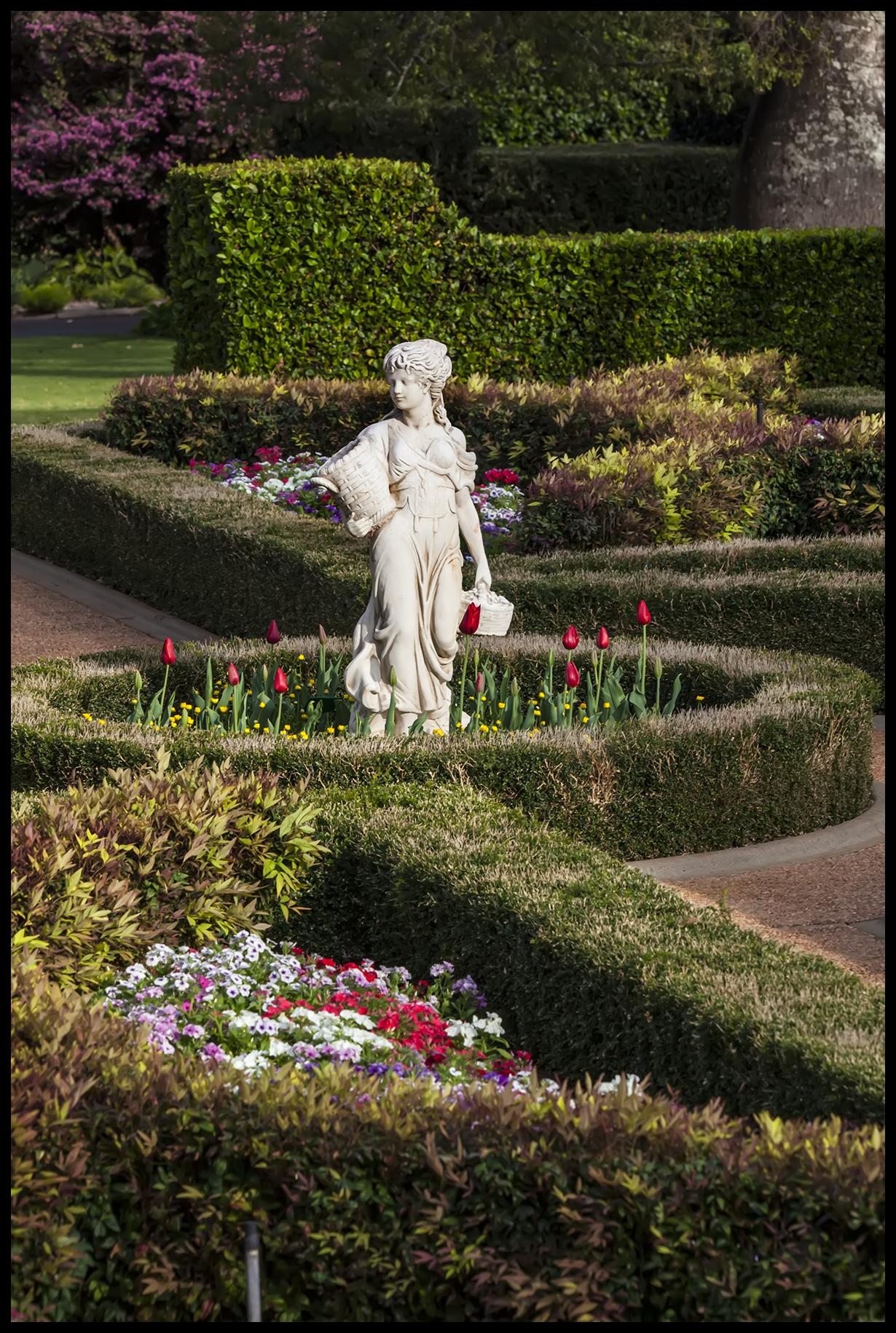
Statue – Queens Park Botanic Gardens 2014
