= Education in Ballarat =

City in Victoria, Australia

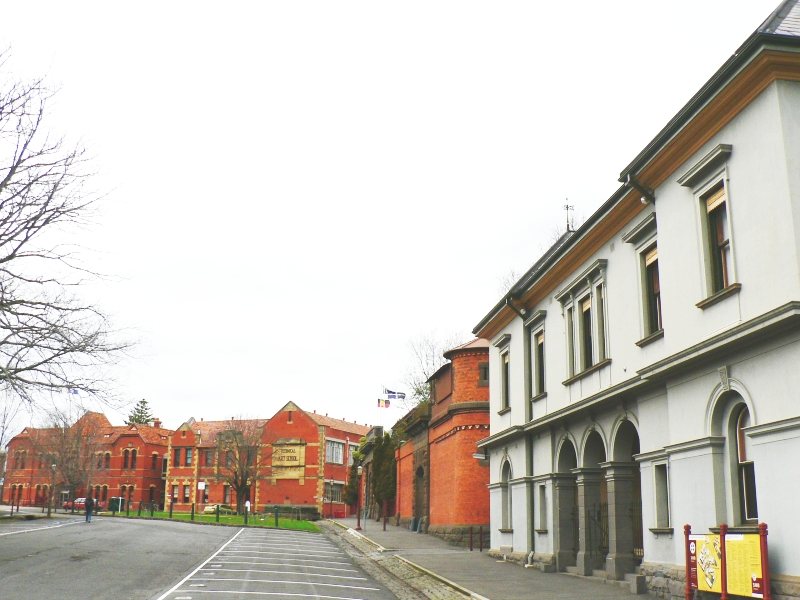
The Ballarat School of Mines and Industry, part of Federation University

Education in the city of Ballarat, Australia may be divided into preschool, primary, secondary and tertiary levels. Ballarat is home to many primary and secondary schools and two universities. Entry to tertiary education for most students is through the Victorian secondary school system, where they receive an Australian Tertiary Admission Rank on completing Year 12.

== Preschool education ==
Ballarat offers 37 preschool institutions. They are located in the suburbs of Alfredton, Bakery Hill, Ballarat Central, Ballarat East, Ballarat North, Black Hill, Brown Hill, Delcombe, Lake Gardens, Lake Wendouree, Mount Clear, Mount Helen, Mount Pleasant, Redan, Sebastopol, Soldiers Hill and Wendouree, and the townships of Buninyong, Cardigan, Creswick and Miners Rest.

== Primary and secondary education ==
Education in the city is overseen by the Victorian Department of Education and Early Childhood Development (DEECD), whose role is to 'provide policy and planning advice for the delivery of education'.

The City of Ballarat lists 55 primary schools within the district, however many of these schools are not in the city. The primary schools in Blowhard, Bungaree, Buninyong, Cape Clear, Clunes, Creswick, Haddon, Lal Lal, Miners Rest, Napoleons, Ross Creek, Warrenheip and Waubra are all serviced by the Ballarat Council.

The city has eleven secondary colleges, consisting of four government, four Catholic and three other non-governmental schools.

Crest	High School	Founded	Location	Enrolment	Type	Median Study Score (2016)
	Ballarat Christian College	1985	Sebastopol	176	Ecumenical, co-ed, day	29
	Ballarat Clarendon College	1864	Ballarat	796	Uniting, co-ed, day&boarding	37
	Ballarat Grammar School	1911	Wendouree	932	Anglican, co-ed, day&boarding	32
	Ballarat High School	1907	Ballarat	1439	Government, co-ed, day	28
	Woodman's Hill	1978	Ballarat East	684	Government, co-ed, day	28
	Damascus College	1881	Mount Clear	1051	Catholic, co-ed, day	28
	Loreto College	1875	Ballarat	898	Catholic, girls, day	31
	Mount Clear College	1976	Mount Clear	1034	Government, co-ed, day	24
	Phoenix College	2011	Sebastopol	903	Government, co-ed, day	26
	St Patrick's College	1893	Ballarat	1404	Catholic, boys, day&boarding	29
	Saints College, Ballarat	2024	Bakery Hill	108	Catholic, co-ed, day	N/A

== Tertiary Education ==
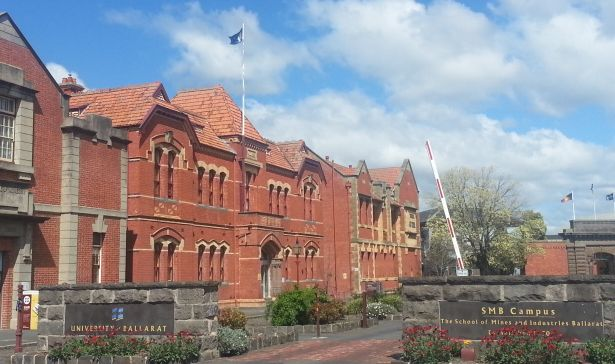
SMB campus is set among the heritage buildings of Lydiard Street Sth including the former School of Mines and Industry (left), former Supreme Court and former Ballarat Gaol (rear)

With two internationally accredited Universities located within Ballarat Federation University Australia (formerly the University of Ballarat) and the Australian Catholic University, Aquinas Campus, the city is well served for all aspects of higher education.

=== Australian Catholic University, Aquinas Campus ===
The Campus began in the establishment of the Aquinas Training College by the Ballarat East Sisters of Mercy in 1909. It later became known as Sacred Heart Training College because of its association with Sacred Heart College, now Damascus College.

In the mid-1960s with increasing enrolments and the demands of a growing school population, the college moved to Patrician House in Victoria Street, Ballarat.

In 1973 the property at 1200 Mair Street, until then the Queen's Church of England Girls' Grammar School, was purchased by the Sisters of St John of God, who conduct St John of God Ballarat Hospital. In turn, the property was purchased by the Diocese of Ballarat and became the new site of the Catholic teachers' college, which was initially known as Aquinas College.

Initially the institute was concerned predominantly with the preparation of primary teachers for Catholic schools, but by 1980 it had accredited courses concerned with post-primary education, nursing, religious education and church music, among others.

In 1990 the Aquinas formally handed responsibility for the Institute and its operations to ACU.

Today, the Ballarat Campus of ACU has around 1000 students, making it the smallest of the city's universities.

=== Federation University ===
Federation University has a long history in Ballarat. The product of the amalgamation of the University of Ballarat and the Gippsland Campus of Monash University in 2014, the university has its earliest origins as the Ballarat School of Mines in 1870.

The School of Mines became known as SMB (the School of Mines and Industries, Ballarat) in 1976, which was the governing body of three Ballarat schools; the Ballarat School of Industries, Ballarat Technical School and the Ballarat Institute of Advanced Education. These schools became the University of Ballarat in 1990, incorporating different schools from Ararat, Stawell and Horsham. SMB also controlled Ballarat Junior Technical School and Ballarat Girls' Junior Technical School which formed Mount Clear College.

== See also ==
- Ballarat Associated Schools
- Education in Victoria
- List of universities in Australia
- List of schools in Ballarat
- List of high schools in Victoria
