= St Paul's College, Ballarat =

St Paul's College

Location
- 113–115 Lydiard Street North, Ballarat (1948–1986); 200 Victoria Street, Ballarat East (1987–1994); Ballarat, Australia, Victoria, 3350
- Coordinates: 37.559051°S 143.858032°E37.558719°S 143.887130°E

Information
- Type: Independent, single-sex, day school
- Motto: Latin: Labor Nobilitat (Work Ennobles)
- Denomination: Roman Catholic, Christian Brothers
- Patron saint: St Paul
- Established: 1948
- Founder: Bishop James O'Connor
- Closed: 1994
- Years offered: 7–10
- Gender: Male
- Colours: Gold, navy, light blue
- Feeder to: St Martin's in the Pines

St Paul's College, formerly St Paul's Technical College and St Paul's Technical School, was a Catholic boys school in Ballarat.

== History ==
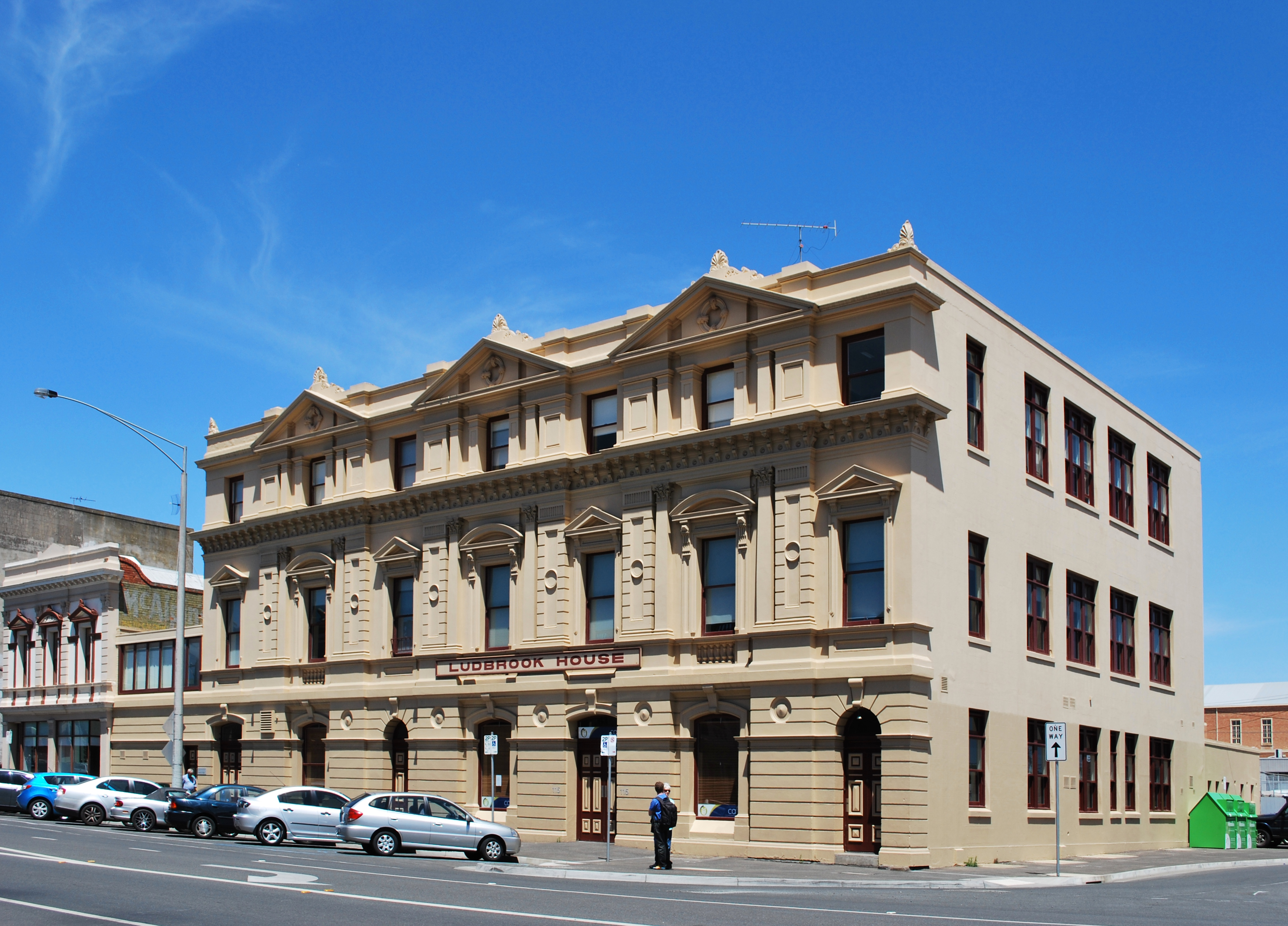

In 1948, the Bishop of Ballarat, James O'Collins established St Paul's Technical College, inviting the Christian Brothers to continue their work for boys through the provision of technical education.

In 1960, Alice Fanning bequeathed property in Mt Clear to the Sisters of Mercy. In 1967 the land was developed for a senior school for girls from Sacred Heart College, named St Martin's in the Pines. The school became co-educational in 1988, with many boys in the senior years of St Paul's attending St Martin's in the Pines.

In 1987, the school moved from Lydiard Street's Ludbrook House to the former Ballarat Orphanage on Victoria Street.

In 1995, the college amalgamated with Sacred Heart College and St Martin's in the Pines to form Damascus College Ballarat.

== Student abuse scandals ==
In 2014 St Paul's was named on Ballarat's child sexual abuse survivors’ group submission to the Royal Commission into Institutional Responses to Child Sexual Abuse, along with other Christian Brothers Schools St Patrick's College, St Joseph's College and Emmanuel College. Also named were De La Salle College and Geelong Grammar School.

== Notable alumni ==
- Geoff Cunningham (1977), AFL footballer for St Kilda
- Daryl Cunningham (1978), AFL footballer
- Anthony McDonald (1990), former AFL footballer for Melbourne
- James McDonald (1992) AFL footballer for Melbourne and Greater Western Sydney
- Mick Malthouse (1971), AFL footballer and coach for Footscray, West Coast Eagles, Collingwood and Carlton
- Maurice O'Keefe (1972), AFL footballer for St Kilda and Geelong
- Val Perovic (1971), former AFL footballer for St Kilda and Carlton
- Sean Simpson (1987), former AFL footballer for St Kilda and Geelong

== Principals ==
Period	Name
1948–1959	W S Cooke
1960–1963	K P Kent
1964–1965	W T Miller
1966–1969	D S Herrick
1970	J F Cunneen (to August)
1970–1972	D E Zoch
1973–1976	Bernard John Scott
1977–1982	F D McGuane
1983–1990	Francis Thomas Hennessy
1991–1992	John P O’Halloran
1993–1994	Laurie F Goodison
