= List of schools in Ballarat =

Local government area in Victoria, Australia

This is a list of schools provided by and within the City of Ballarat, Victoria, Australia.

School	Suburb or town	Years	M/F/co-ed	Category	Founded	Website
Alfredton Primary School	Alfredton	Primary	Co-ed	Government		website
Ballarat Christian College	Sebastopol	Prep to Year 12	Co-ed	Christian	1985	website
Ballarat Clarendon College	Ballarat	Prep to Year 12	Co-ed	Uniting	1864	website
Ballarat Grammar School	Wendouree	K-12	Co-ed	Anglican	1911	website
Ballarat High School	Ballarat	Secondary	Co-ed	Government	1907	website
Ballarat North Primary School	Ballarat	Primary	Co-ed	Government	1953	website
Ballarat Secondary College	Ballarat	Secondary	Co-ed	Government	1994	website
Ballarat Steiner School and Kindergarten	Mount Helen	Primary	Co-ed	Rudolf Steiner	2000	website
Black Hill Primary School	Black Hill	Primary	Co-ed	Government	1881	website
Bungaree Primary School	Bungaree	Primary	Co-ed	Government	1877	website
Buninyong Primary School	Buninyong	Primary	Co-ed	Government	1874	website
Caledonian Primary School	Brown Hill	Primary	Co-ed	Government	1994	website
Canadian Lead Primary School	Ballarat East	Primary	Co-ed	Government	1994	website
Cape Clear Primary School	Cape Clear	Primary	Co-ed	Government		
Clunes Primary School	Clunes	Primary	Co-ed	Government	1875	website
Creswick North Primary School	Creswick	Primary	Co-ed	Government		website
Creswick Primary School	Creswick	Primary	Co-ed	Government	1854	website
Damascus College	Mount Clear	Secondary	Co-ed	Catholic	1881	website
Dana Street Primary School	Ballarat	Primary	Co-ed	Government	1857	website
Delacombe Primary School	Delacombe	Primary	Co-ed	Government	1981	website
Emmaus Catholic Primary School	Mount Clear	Primary	Co-ed	Catholic	2008	website
Forest Street Primary School	Wendouree	Primary	Co-ed	Government	1966	website
Glen Park Primary School	Glen Park	Primary	Co-ed	Government	1871	website
Haddon Primary School	Haddon	Primary	Co-ed	Government	1870	website
Invermay Primary School	Invermay	Primary	Co-ed	Government	1867	website
Lal Lal Primary School	Lal Lal	Primary	Co-ed	Government	1866	website
Little Bendigo Primary School	Nerrina	Primary	Co-ed	Government	1874	website
Loreto College	Ballarat	Secondary	F	Catholic	1875	website
Lumen Christi School	Delacombe	Primary	Co-ed	Catholic	1990	website
Macarthur Street Primary School	Soldiers Hill	Primary	Co-ed	Government	1878	website
Magpie Primary School	Magpie	Primary	Co-ed	Government	1880	website
Miners Rest Primary School	Miners Rest	K to Year 6	Co-ed	Government	1858	website
Mount Blowhard Primary School	Blowhard	Primary	Co-ed	Government		website
Mount Clear College	Mount Clear	Secondary	Co-ed	Government	1976	website
Mount Clear Primary School	Mount Clear	Primary	Co-ed	Government	1958	website
Mount Pleasant Primary School	Ballarat	Primary	Co-ed	Government	1855	website
Mount Rowan Secondary College	Wendouree	Secondary	Co-ed	Government	2019	website
Napoleons Primary School	Napoleons	Primary	Co-ed	Government	1870	website
Newington Primary School	Ballarat	Primary	Co-ed	Government	1860	website
Our Lady Help of Christians School	Wendouree	Primary	Co-ed	Catholic	1961	website
Phoenix P-12 Community College	Sebastopol	Kinder to Year 12	Co-ed	Government	2011	website
Pleasant Street Primary School	Lake Wendouree	Primary	Co-ed	Government	1877	website
Sebastopol Primary School	Sebastopol	Primary	Co-ed	Government	1873	website
Siena Catholic Primary School	Lucas	Primary	Co-ed	Catholic	2017	
St Alipius' Primary School	Ballarat East	Primary	Co-ed	Catholic	1853	website
St Aloysius' School	Redan	Primary	Co-ed	Catholic	1876	website
St Brendan's Primary School	Dunnstown	Primary	Co-ed	Catholic	1858	website
St Columba's School	Soldiers Hill	Primary	Co-ed	Catholic	1911	website
St Francis Xavier School	Ballarat East	Primary	Co-ed	Catholic	1914	website
St James' Parish School	Sebastopol	Primary	Co-ed	Catholic	1956	website
St Mary's School	Clarkes Hill	Primary	Co-ed	Catholic	1946	website
St Patrick's College	Ballarat	Secondary	M	Catholic	1893	website
St Patrick's Primary School	Ballarat	Primary	Co-ed	Catholic	1924	website
St Thomas More School	Alfredton	Primary	Co-ed	Catholic	1980	website
Warrenheip Primary School	Warrenheip	Primary	Co-ed	Government	1876	website
Waubra Primary School	Waubra	Primary	Co-ed	Government	1916	website
Wendouree Primary School	Wendouree	Primary	Co-ed	Government		website
Woady Yaloak Primary School	Scarsdale, Smythesdale, Snake Valley, Ross Creek	Primary	Co-ed	Government	1994	website
Woodmans Hill Secondary College	Ballarat East	Secondary	Co-ed	Government	2019	website
Yuille Park P-8 Community College	Wendouree	Primary	Co-ed	Government	2008	website

== See also ==
- Education in Ballarat
