= Mount Clear College =

Location
- 59 Olympic Avenue; Mount Clear, Victoria, Australia, 3350; 37.6076°S 143.8759°E

Information
- Type: State, co-educational, day school
- Motto: Care, commitment, respect, responsibility
- Established: 1976
- Principal: Jen Bromley-Lynch (Acting)
- Years offered: 7–12
- Gender: Co-educational
- Enrolment: 1080
- Colours: Earth red, charcoal & stormy blue
- VCE average: 27
- Affiliation: Ballarat Associated Schools
- Website: mountclearcollege.vic.edu.au

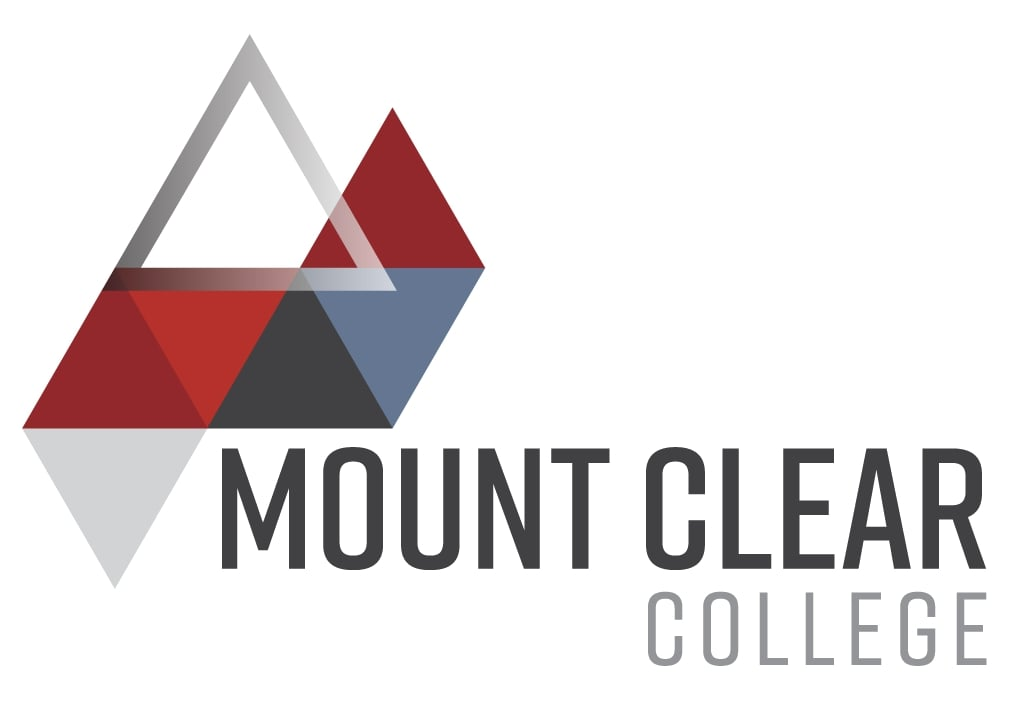
Mount Clear College logo as of 2022

Mount Clear College, formerly known as Mount Clear Secondary College and Mount Clear Technical High School, is a public high school in Ballarat, Victoria, Australia. It was established after two secondary colleges, Ballarat Boys' Technical School and Ballarat Girls' High School amalgamated in 1981. The college is located in Mount Clear, seven km (4.3 mi) from Ballarat's central business district.

== History ==
Ballarat Technical School was founded as a boys' school in 1913, and was officially opened in July 1915 by Sir Alexander Peacock.

In 1976, following the successful amalgamation of the Ballarat Technical School and the Ballarat Girls' High School (est. 1951), Mount Clear Technical High School opened as a school for years 7 to 10 students. Both of those schools had a rich tradition that started in 1874. The Technical school, known as ”Central Tech", was located in Lydiard St South in the CBD and the High School, known as the "Girls School", was located in Barkly Street, Ballarat East.

In 1977, four mini schools were established. One was for students at the Lydiard Street campus. It was known as Lalor Mini School. Students at the old Girls High site were part of the Barkly Mini School. In that year all new year 7 students were based at the Mount Clear campus. Two new mini schools, Canadian and Currawong were also added.

In October 1981, a new building designed around the concept of the mini schools was completed. Students from Lalor Mini School were the first to move into the new building. By the end of that year all students had moved to the new site which was immediately to the east of the Mount Clear Recreation Reserve and just north of the former Mount Clear Railway Station.

In the mid-1980s, in response to school community concerns, year 11 and 12 began to be taught at the school. The names of the mini schools have been retained in the forms of the house names, and on the logo. In 2002 the official name of Mount Clear College was adopted.

== Curriculum ==
Students in Year 6 can apply for the ASPIRE (formerly known as the SEALP program) .

== Houses ==
- Barkly – named for Barkly Street, the former site of Ballarat Girls' School, now a campus of Ballarat Secondary College
- Canadian – named for the Ballarat suburb of Canadian
- Currawong – named for the currawong, an Australian bird
- Lalor – named for leader of the Eureka Rebellion and politician Peter Lalor

== Sport ==
MCC is a member of the Ballarat Associated Schools (BAS).

MCC has won the following BAS premierships.

Boys:

- Badminton (2) – 2016, 2017
- Lawn Bowls (1) - 2026

Girls:

- Badminton – 2015
- Basketball – 1977
- Volleyball (2) – 1976, 1977

== Notable alumni ==
- Darren Cheeseman, former Member of the Australian Parliament for the Division of Corangamite
- Dan Golding, writer, composer, broadcaster, and academic

== See also ==
- Education in Ballarat
- List of schools in Ballarat
- List of schools in Victoria, Australia
- List of high schools in Victoria
