= Damascus College Ballarat =

Damascus College
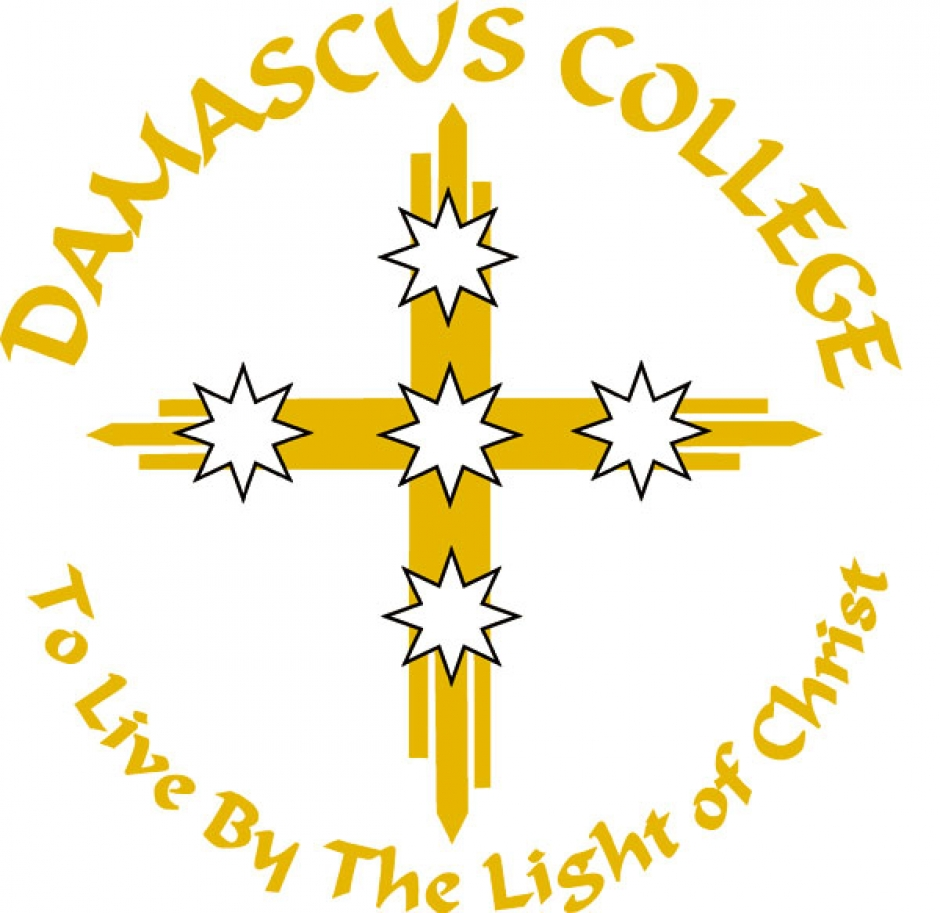

Location
- 1412 Geelong Road, Mount Clear; Ballarat, Victoria, 3350; Australia; 37°36′42″S 143°52′7″E

Information
- Type: Catholic, Private, Independent, Co-educational, Day school
- Motto: Latin: Luce Christi Vivere (To live by the light of Christ)
- Denomination: Roman Catholic, Sisters of Mercy
- Established: 1881 (Sacred Heart); 1948 (St Paul's); 1968 (St Martin's in the Pines). 1995 (Amalgamation)
- School board: Berenice Kerr RSM and Kevin Maloney
- School number: 265
- Principal: Steven Mifsud
- Staff: 129
- Teaching staff: 86
- Years offered: 7–12
- Gender: Co-educational
- Enrolment: 1102
- Colours: Gold, navy blue and maroon
- VCE average: 28
- Affiliation: Ballarat Associated Schools
- Website: http://www.damascus.vic.edu.au/

Damascus College is Ballarat’s only Catholic co-educational secondary college. It was established in 1995 after three separate Catholic colleges, St Martin's in the Pines, Sacred Heart College and St Paul's College amalgamated. The college is located on a treed 20 hectare campus in Mount Clear, 7 km from Ballarat's central business district. Damascus College is a day school for secondary students in years 7 to 12.

== Origins ==
=== Sacred Heart College ===
In 1881, the Sisters of Mercy established Sacred Heart College in Ballarat East for students from Preparatory to Year 12. The primary students were later moved to St Francis Xavier College in 1907.

=== St Paul's Technical College ===
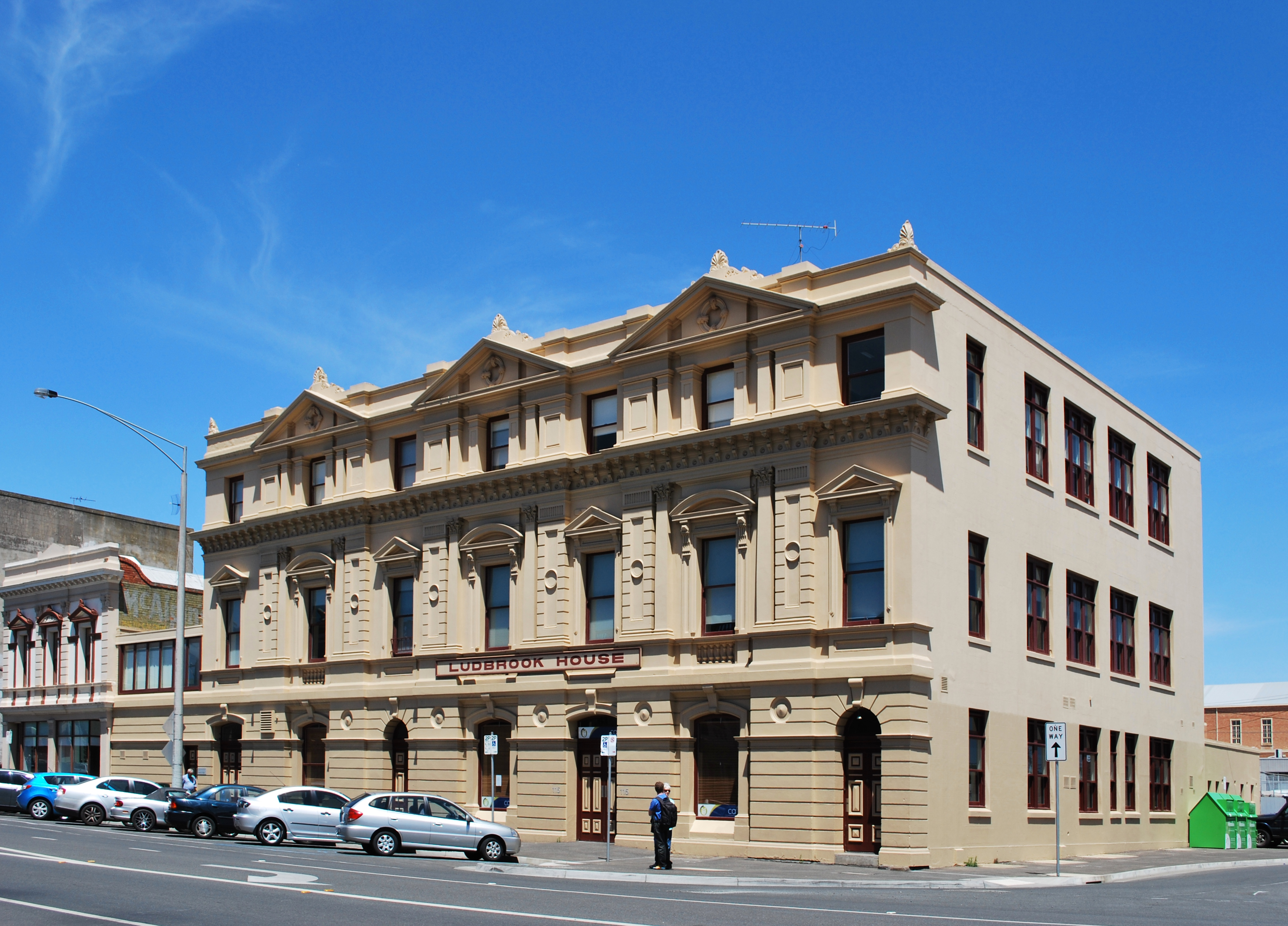
Ludbrook House, formerly the site of St Paul's

When the Bishop of Ballarat, James O'Collins established St Paul's Technical College in 1948, he invited the Christian Brothers to continue their work for boys through the provision of technical education.

In 1987 the school moved from Lydiard St to the former Ballarat Orphanage on Victoria Street.

=== St Martin's in the Pines ===
Alice Fanning, who had been looked after by the Sisters of Mercy for several years, bequeathed the Mt Clear property to the Sisters of Mercy on her death in February 1960. The land was used by the Sisters to grow vegetables and raise cattle, and following the decision in 1964 to develop the site for the senior school of Sacred Heart College, the foundation stone was laid in 1966.

In 1967, the separate campus for Year 11 and 12 girls was developed at Mt Clear to form St Martin's in the Pines. In 1988, this campus became co-educational, with boys mainly from St Paul's Technical College. St Martin's in the Pines remained an all girls boarding school for students, the majority who came from country Victoria. In beginning years, all 4 floors of the boarding house were utilised as bedrooms (cells). Over the years, the need for a boarding school was reflected in the reduced numbers of students who resided in the boarding house. In 1994, only one floor was used by students, and each had access to two rooms, one a bedroom, one being a study. Sister Elizabeth Maloney was the last Head Boarding Mistress 1992-1994.

=== Amalgamation ===
In 1995 Sacred Heart College, St Martin's in the Pines and St Paul's Technical College amalgamated to form Ballarat's only co-educational Catholic secondary school. Year 7 to 9 students were located in Victoria St at the former St Paul's site and Year 10 to 12 students were located in Mt Clear at the former site of St Martin's in the Pines. In 2011 all students were relocated to Mt Clear. Damascus College is jointly sponsored by the Sisters of Mercy and the parish priests of Ballarat, Ballarat East, Ballarat North, Bungaree, Cressy, Creswick, Daylesford, Gordon, Linton, Redan, Sebastopol, and Wendouree.

In 2016 the college was named the Sustainability Victoria Biodiversity Secondary School of the Year.

== Curriculum ==
The college's curriculum is informed by a number of key documents including the College Vision and Mission Statement, Teaching and Learning Policy, the Australian Curriculum, the Victorian Essential Learning Standards, VCAA and the Victorian Registration and Qualifications Authority.

Students have the opportunity to learn French or Indonesian from Year 7 to 12. Physical Education and Health are taken from years 7 to 10, while Religious Education is taken for all years. Damascus College offers VCE, VET and VCE Vocational Major to Year 10, 11 and 12 students.

== Extracurricular activities ==
=== Mercy and Justice ===
- Timor-Leste Immersion Program – students are given the opportunity to raise funds for Timor-Leste and visit the college's sister school Santa Maria in Ainaro
- Edmund Rice Camps – students are trained to become camp leaders for disadvantaged children and families
- Seeds of Justice – a Mercy Schools Project which allows students to deepen their awareness of justice
- Mercy Works – projects supporting local and overseas relief and development activities
- Justice Action Group (JAG) – social justice group
- Christian Personal Development Award (CPDA)

=== Sustainable Racing Team (SRT) ===
Since 1998 Damascus College students have designed, built and tested Human Powered Vehicles (HPVs). The team trains and competes annually in the Energy Breakthrough challenge in Maryborough. The competition involves a 24-hour non-stop endurance race where teams gain points for the most laps travelled as well as their demonstrated knowledge of the vehicle and the technology used to make the vehicle. SRT is offered as a after-school extra-curricular activity that requires students to build the vehicles in an effort to engage them in energy efficient technologies that may make up the future of transport and manufacturing. Additionally, the team competes in the Victorian HPV Grand Prix Series and Australian HPV Super Series.

The college won the World Future Cycle Challenge in 2005 and 2007, a 1200 km journey from Ceduna to Adelaide.

In March 2008 Damascus College rode 1009 km in under 24 hours from Sydney to Ballarat to raise awareness of solutions to greenhouse emissions and to raise funds for sustainable energy and food programs.

In 2009, SRT rode a 3775 km journey by solar vehicle from Darwin to the steps of the Victorian State Parliament from 23 November - 9 December, just as the 2009 United Nations Climate Change Conference in Copenhagen opened. Their Outback Rode RAGE (Ride Against Greenhouse Emissions) campaign aimed to raise awareness about climate change and how individuals can reduce their environmental footprints. Seven students took turns on the hi-tech vehicle. The vehicle was 30 per cent powered by solar electricity and 70 per cent by pedalling and hit a top of 115 km/h.

Formerly known as Energy Breakthrough Team (EBT), in 2019 it was renamed to Sustainable Racing Team (SRT).

In May 2024, SRT rode 1085 km from Broken Hill to Ballarat to raise money for the Fiona Elsey Cancer Research Institute.

=== Drama ===
Students can join the senior or junior Drama Club, can participate in the annual production and the biannual Easter production the Final Hours.

Year	Production	Year	Production
1995	Children of Dust	1999	Animal Farm
2001	Sunrise Sunset	2002	Little Shop Of Horrors
2003	Foreigners From Home & Henry	2004	Fame
2005	Small Poppies	2006	Seussical
2007	Così	2008	The Wiz
2009	A Midsummer Night's Dream	2010	Footloose
2011	Beach	2012	Annie
2013	The Diary of Anne Frank	2014	Superman
2015	The 39 Steps	2016	Grease
2017	The Crucible	2018	Joseph and the Amazing Technicolor Dreamcoat
2019	Around the World in 80 Days	2020	Oliver! (cancelled)
2021	The 25th Annual Putnam County Spelling Bee	2022	Clue
2023	The Addams Family (musical)	2024	The Curious Incident Of The Dog In The Night-Time (Senior) The Brothers Grimm Spectaculathon
2025	Oliver!		

=== Sport ===
Each year school swimming, athletics and ball sports carnivals are held for all students to participate in. Damascus College is a member of the Ballarat Associated Schools through which students can choose to represent the school in:

- Athletics
- Badminton
- Baseball
- Basketball
- Cricket
- Croquet
- Cross Country
- Football
- Golf
- Hockey
- Lawn Bowls
- Netball
- Racquetball
- Rowing
- Soccer
- Softball
- Squash
- Swimming
- Table Tennis
- Tennis
- Volleyball

==== BAS premierships ====
Damascus has won the following BAS premierships. Premierships won prior to 1995 were done so by the pre-amalgamation schools.

Combined:

- Athletics – 1995
- Badminton (2) – 2006, 2007
- Lawn Bowls – 1997

Boys:

- Badminton (4) – 2006, 2008, 2009, 2019
- Cross Country – 1990
- Soccer – 2003

Girls:

- Athletics (6) – 1971, 1972, 1973, 1974, 1977, 1995
- Badminton – 2017
- Basketball (10) – 1965, 1966, 1969, 1971, 1972, 1975, 1982, 1997, 1999, 2000
- Football (2) – 1999, 2000
- Hockey – 1976
- Netball (7) – 1961, 1966, 1967, 1970, 1972, 1991, 1992
- Soccer (3) – 1999, 2000, 2003
- Softball (2) – 1965, 2008
- Volleyball (2) – 1989, 1992

=== Other ===
- Debating and Public Speaking
- SRC (Student Representative Council)
- French and Indonesian Language Study Tours
- Skiing trips
- Youth-Tutoring-Youth Program
- Green Group
- Book Club

== Campus wings ==
Damascus College is divided into several school wings

- Sacred Heart Wing (Building 2) – year 9 and 10 classrooms named for Sacred Heart College
- Catherine McAuley Wing (Building 4) – year 7 and 8 classrooms named for Sister Catherine McAuley
- Genevieve McDonald Wing (Building 3) – Science classrooms named for Sister Genevieve McDonald
- John Shannon Centre – gymnasium named in honour of first Damascus principal, John Shannon
- Mercy Wing – administration and visitor reception named in honour of the Sisters of Mercy
- Our Lady of Mercy Chapel – Catholic chapel for students and staff to use during school
- St Martin's Resource Centre (Building 1) – library, named for St Martin's in the Pines
- St Paul's Arts and Technology Wing (Building 5) – art, metal and woodwork rooms named for St Paul's Technical College
- Valda Ward Auditorium – drama auditorium and rooms named after Sister Valda Ward
- Damascus Events Centre – a multipurpose building primarily for hosting events and exams
- Xavier Flood Centre (Building 11) – senior wing featuring multiple studying spaces, classrooms and courtyard areas
- Edmund Rice Wing (Building 7) – classrooms, drama and music rooms named for Edmund Ignatius Rice

== Houses ==
- Rice: Brother Edmund Ignatius Rice founded the Christian Brothers in Ireland in 1802 to educate the sons of poor and oppressed Catholic families. The brothers provided education by which these boys gained some control of their lives.
- McAuley: Venerable Catherine McAuley founded the Sisters of Mercy, who had their formal beginnings in Ireland in 1831. In response to the needs of the time, Catherine McAuley established an institution for the care and education of less advantaged girls and young women. The congregation has continued to act in response to contemporary needs in society.
- Xavier: Mother Xavier Flood was one of the founding sisters of the Convent of Mercy, Ballarat East and the first principal of Sacred Heart College.
- St Martin: Saint Martin de Porres (formerly O'Collins House) – Saint Martin de Porres was a Peruvian lay brother who was canonized in 1962, he is most remembered for his work on behalf of the poor. The house name was changed to St Martin after the Royal Commission into Institutional Responses to Child Sexual Abuse found that Bishop James O'Collins received complaints about Gerald Ridsdale but did nothing to act on them.

== Principals ==
Period	Name
1995–2004	John Shannon
2005–2010	Tony Duggan
2011–2022	Matthew Byrne
2022–present	Steven Mifsud

== Notable alumni ==
=== Sacred Heart College ===
- Karen Overington (1969), Member of the Victorian Parliament for Ballarat West
- Judith Myrea Brewer (1979), Officer of the Order of Australia

=== St Paul's Technical College ===
- Mick Malthouse (1971), AFL footballer and coach for Footscray, West Coast Eagles, Collingwood and Carlton
- Val Perovic (1971), former AFL footballer for St Kilda and Carlton
- Maurice O'Keefe (1972), AFL footballer for St Kilda and Geelong
- Geoff Cunningham (1977), AFL footballer for St Kilda
- Daryl Cunningham (1978), AFL footballer
- Sean Simpson (1987), former AFL footballer for St Kilda and Geelong
- Anthony McDonald (1990), former AFL footballer for Melbourne
- James McDonald (1992) AFL footballer for Melbourne and Greater Western Sydney

=== St Martin's In the Pines ===
- Helen FitzGerald (1984), novelist and screenwriter
- Rachael Taylor (1994), olympic medalist for rowing

=== Damascus College ===
- Darren Jolly (1996), dual AFL premiership winner with Sydney and Collingwood
- Shayne Reese (2000), Olympic and Commonwealth Games swimmer
- Cameron Richardson (2005), former AFL footballer for North Melbourne
- James Frawley (2006), Melbourne Football Club
- Jordan Roughead (2008 school captain), AFL premiership winner for the Western Bulldogs
- Sam Rizzo, Paralympic and Commonwealth Games athlete
- Shelby Sherritt, ceramicist

== See also ==
- Catholic All Schools Sports Association (CAS)
- Education in Ballarat
- List of schools in Victoria
- List of Christian Brothers schools
- List of schools in Ballarat
- List of high schools in Victoria
- Sacred Heart College, Ballarat
- Victorian Certificate of Education
