= Loreto College, Victoria =

Loreto College, Ballarat

Location
- Ballarat, Victoria; Australia; 37°33′25″S 143°49′25″E

Information
- Type: Independent secondary day school
- Motto: Latin: Maria Regina Angelorum. Cruci Dum Spiro Fido (Mary, Queen of the Angels. As long as I live I put my faith in Christ who died for me.)
- Religious affiliation: Institute of the Blessed Virgin Mary
- Denomination: Roman Catholic
- Established: 1875; 151 years ago
- School number: 35
- Principal: Ms Christine Shaw
- Years: 7–12
- Gender: Girls; Boys (1875–1973, K–3 only)
- Enrolment: 860
- Colours: Gold and blue
- Slogan: Proudly educating young women of influence for 150 years.
- VCE average: 31
- Affiliation: Ballarat Associated Schools
- Website: www.loreto.vic.edu.au

Loreto College, Ballarat is an independent Roman Catholic secondary day school for girls, located in central Ballarat, Victoria, Australia.

== History ==
Loreto College Ballarat was the first Loreto school in Australia, established by Mother Gonzaga Barry and her community of religious sisters in 1875 following an invitation from the Bishop of Ballarat to establish a school for girls. This boarding school was known as Loreto Abbey Mary's Mount and was soon followed by a day school, also in Ballarat, known as Loreto Convent Dawson Street.

Mother Gonzaga had come to Australia from Ireland and established local primary schools as well as Loreto schools in Melbourne, Sydney, Brisbane, Adelaide and Perth.

From its founding in 1875 until 1973, boys were admitted from kindergarten until grades two or three; since 1973, the school has admitted girls only.

In 1978, Dawson Street Day School and Mary's Mount were formally amalgamated to form Loreto College Ballarat, with Years 7–8 at Dawson Street and Years 9–12 at Sturt Street – Mary's Mount. In 2007, Loreto's junior and senior campuses were combined on the one campus at Sturt Street following the construction of the Mary Ward Centre for Years 7–8. The Dawson Street site closed in 2006, and was used by Ballarat High School for a short time before being bought by the Quest Apartments group. In 2015, the college opened The Mary's Mount Centre. This performing arts centre houses a 500-seat theatre along with music and dance studios, classrooms and multimedia labs.

== Sport ==
Loreto is a member of the Ballarat Associated Schools (BAS).

=== BAS premierships ===
Loreto has won the following BAS premierships. Combined premierships were won with St Patrick's College.

Girls:

- Athletics (20) – 1978, 1979, 1990, 1991, 1997, 1998, 1999, 2000, 2001, 2002, 2006, 2008, 2009, 2010, 2011, 2012, 2013, 2014, 2016, 2018
- Badminton – 2016
- Basketball (18) – 1978, 1980, 1983, 1984, 1985, 1986, 1987, 1988, 1989, 1991, 1992, 1993, 1994, 1995, 1996, 2006, 2007, 2008
- Cricket (22) – 1990, 1991, 1992, 1993, 1995, 1996, 1999, 2001, 2002, 2003, 2004, 2005, 2006, 2007, 2008, 2009, 2010, 2011, 2012, 2013, 2014, 2015
- Cross Country (20) – 1982, 1983, 1984, 1985, 1986, 1987, 1989, 1990, 1991, 1992, 1993, 1994, 1995, 1996, 1997, 1998, 1999, 2000, 2012, 2018
- Football (2) – 2001, 2008
- Hockey (4) – 2010, 2011, 2013, 2015
- Lap of the Lake (24) – 1982, 1983, 1984, 1985, 1986, 1987, 1988, 1989, 1990, 1991, 1992, 1993, 1994, 1995, 1996, 1997, 1998, 1999, 2000, 2001, 2009, 2012, 2018, 2019
- Netball (8) – 1977, 1978, 1990, 1994, 1995, 1996, 2001, 2018
- Road Relay (7) – 1997, 1998, 2000, 2009, 2010, 2012, 2014
- Soccer (8) – 2001, 2002, 2004, 2006, 2008, 2011, 2017, 2018
- Softball (12) – 1964, 1967, 1978, 1980, 1981, 1982, 1988, 1991, 1993, 1999, 2000, 2011
- Volleyball (3) – 1982, 1987, 2013

Combined:

- Athletics (8) – 1990, 1997, 1998, 1999, 2000, 2001, 2002, 2003
- Badminton (11) – 1983, 1984, 1986, 1992, 1999, 2000, 2001, 2002, 2005, 2008, 2010
- Cross Country (18) – 1982, 1983, 1984, 1985, 1986, 1987, 1989, 1990, 1991, 1992, 1993, 1994, 1995, 1996, 1997, 1998, 1999, 2000
- Lap of the Lake (20) – 1982, 1983, 1984, 1985, 1986, 1987, 1988, 1989, 1990, 1991, 1992, 1993, 1994, 1995, 1996, 1997, 1998, 1999, 2000, 2001
- Road Relay (4) – 1997, 1998, 1999, 2000

== Notable alumnae ==
- Georgia Amoore, professional basketball player for the Washington Mystics, (2025-)
- Mary Delahunty, Victorian Labor Minister for Arts and Women's Affairs and a former ABC journalist
- Dame Doris Fitton (1897–1985), actress and theatrical producer
- Lesbia Harford (1891–1927), poet, novelist, political activist
- Michelle Payne, first female jockey to win the Melbourne Cup (won in 2015)
- Emma Ryan-Weber, astronomer
- Kate Torney, CEO State Library of Victoria, previously: director of ABC News
- Sophie Van De Heuvel, Australian rules footballer with the Geelong Football Club
- June Wright (1919–2012), author of six murder mysteries
- Juliana Addison, State Labor Member for Wendouree (2018–)
- Talia Martin, youngest female winner of the Stawell Gift (2016)

== Related schools ==
There are six other Loreto related schools in Australia. These include:

- John XXIII College (Perth)
- Loreto Nedlands (Perth)
- Loreto Coorparoo (Brisbane)
- Loreto Kirribilli (Sydney)
- Loreto Mandeville Hall (Melbourne)
- Loreto Marryatville (Adelaide)
- Loreto Normanhurst (Sydney)

There are also many other Loreto schools worldwide including Ireland and India.

== See also ==
- List of schools in Ballarat
- List of non-government schools in Victoria
- Victorian Certificate of Education
