= Geoff Tunbridge =

Australian rules footballer

- Tunbridge in 1958

Personal information
- Born: 7 April 1932
- Died: 23 March 2015 (aged 82)
- Original team: University Blues
- Height: 178 cm (5 ft 10 in)
- Weight: 72 kg (159 lb)

Playing career^{1}
Years	Club	Games (Goals)
1957–1962	Melbourne	117 (129)
- ^{1} Playing statistics correct to the end of 1962.

Geoff R. Tunbridge (7 April 1932 – 23 March 2015) was an Australian rules footballer who played for the Melbourne Football Club in the Victorian Football League (VFL). At the age of 25, Tunbridge was recruited to Melbourne from Ballarat, where he was an Old Boy (from 1949) and teacher at Ballarat Church of England Boys Grammar School. His jumper was number 23 and he was a red-headed, spearing left-foot flanker.

He originally commenced his football career for University Blues in the Victorian Amateur Football Association. He began studies in Science at Melbourne University in 1952, and in 1953 entered residence at Trinity College (University of Melbourne), where he also played cricket and tennis.

Tunbridge refused on ideological grounds to accept payment from Melbourne Football Club, as he believed that players should play for the love of the game. The only money he did accept was compensation for the cost of petrol, given the long drive between Ballarat and Melbourne (eight pence/year in his Volkswagen). He also often ate a meat pie half an hour before the game.

Tunbridge earned a nomination on the forward flank for the Melbourne Team of the Century, but this position was ultimately awarded to Garry Lyon. He played in three premierships for Melbourne in the late 1950s.

His formal association with Ballarat Grammar spanned 40 years. He first came to the school as student in 1949 and retired from Ballarat Grammar School in 1990. Tunbridge then taught at Leibler Yavneh College for over a decade.

== Death ==
Tunbridge died in 2015, aged 82.
