= Emma Ryan-Weber =

Australian astronomer (born c.1976)

Emma Veronica Ryan-Weber (born c. 1976) is an Australian astronomer, a professor in the Department of Physics and Astronomy at the Swinburne University of Technology in Melbourne, and was the director of the multi-institution Australian Research Council Centre of Excellence for All Sky Astrophysics in 3 Dimensions (ASTRO 3D) which came to an end in 2024.

== Research ==
Ryan-Weber's research concerns the composition of the intergalactic medium, determined by the absorption patterns of light from far-distant galaxies, and what the changes in this composition over time can tell us about how the universe has evolved. For instance, her work on measuring the carbon in the early universe found less of it than expected, suggesting that some energy source other than carbon-rich massive stars was needed to reionize the hydrogen in the early universe, making it transparent.

== Education and career ==
Ryan-Weber is originally from Ballarat, where her early memories include seeing Halley's Comet in 1986, when she was 10. In year 10 at Loreto College, Victoria, she won an essay contest to travel to the US for a Space Camp. She became a student of physics at the University of Melbourne, continuing there for her Ph.D. with doctoral research on radio astronomy at the Parkes Observatory, focusing on observations of neutral hydrogen both in galaxies and in intergalactic space. Her 2004 doctoral dissertation was supervised by Rachel Webster.

She obtained a five-year postdoctoral research position at the Institute of Astronomy, Cambridge, from 2004 through 2008, through which she gained access to several large optical telescopes. She returned to Australia to her present position at the Swinburne University of Technology, initially as an Australian Research Council Queen Elizabeth II Fellow.

At Swinburne, and as director of ASTRO 3D, Ryan-Weber has been a strong advocate for women in science, and over five years has brought the center up from having 30% women among its researchers to 50%.
