= Dawg Class =

Amwerican women's basketball camp

The Dawg Class is a women's basketball camp founded by Kelsey Plum and sponsored by Under Armour. It has been held since 2023, providing training and mentorship for amateur guards in preparation for the Women's National Basketball Association (WNBA).

== History ==
In March 2023, WNBA star Kelsey Plum, nicknamed "Plum Dawg," announced the launch of the Dawg Class, a weekend basketball camp for amateur female guards with professional aspirations. The initiative, aimed at providing high-level training and mentorship, was developed in collaboration with sportswear brand Under Armour. Plum was inspired to create the Dawg Class by her challenges in adjusting to the WNBA and the disparity in resources available to prospects in the WNBA compared to the National Basketball Association (NBA).

The inaugural Dawg Class was held in April 2023 at IMG Academy in Bradenton, Florida, and included Diamond Miller, who had been selected second overall in the WNBA draft, held four days before the camp. The second edition of the camp was also held at IMG Academy, before it moved to Phoenix, Arizona in 2025.

== Camp results ==
Year	Location	Top competitor	College
2023	Bradenton, Florida	—	—
2024	Bradenton, Florida	Saniya Rivers	NC State
2025	Phoenix, Arizona	KK Arnold	UConn

== Alumni ==
- Georgia Amoore (2023–2025)
- KK Arnold (2024, 2025)
- Mikayla Blakes (2025)
- KK Bransford (2023)
- Zoe Brooks (2025)
- Jaloni Cambridge (2025)
- Dyaisha Fair (2024)
- Azzi Fudd (2023, 2025)
- MiLaysia Fulwiley (2024)
- Rori Harmon (2023)
- Kayleigh Heckel (2025)
- Ashlon Jackson (2025)
- Aziaha James (2024)
- Raven Johnson (2023, 2024)
- Tessa Johnson (2025)
- Deja Kelly (2023)
- Gianna Kneepkens (2023)
- Ta'Niya Latson (2024)
- Diamond Miller (2023)
- Nika Mühl (2024)
- Saniya Rivers (2024)
- Shyanne Sellers (2024, 2025)
- Syla Swords (2025)
- Harmoni Turner (2025)
- Hailey Van Lith (2023)
