= MiLaysia Fulwiley =

American basketball player (born 2005)

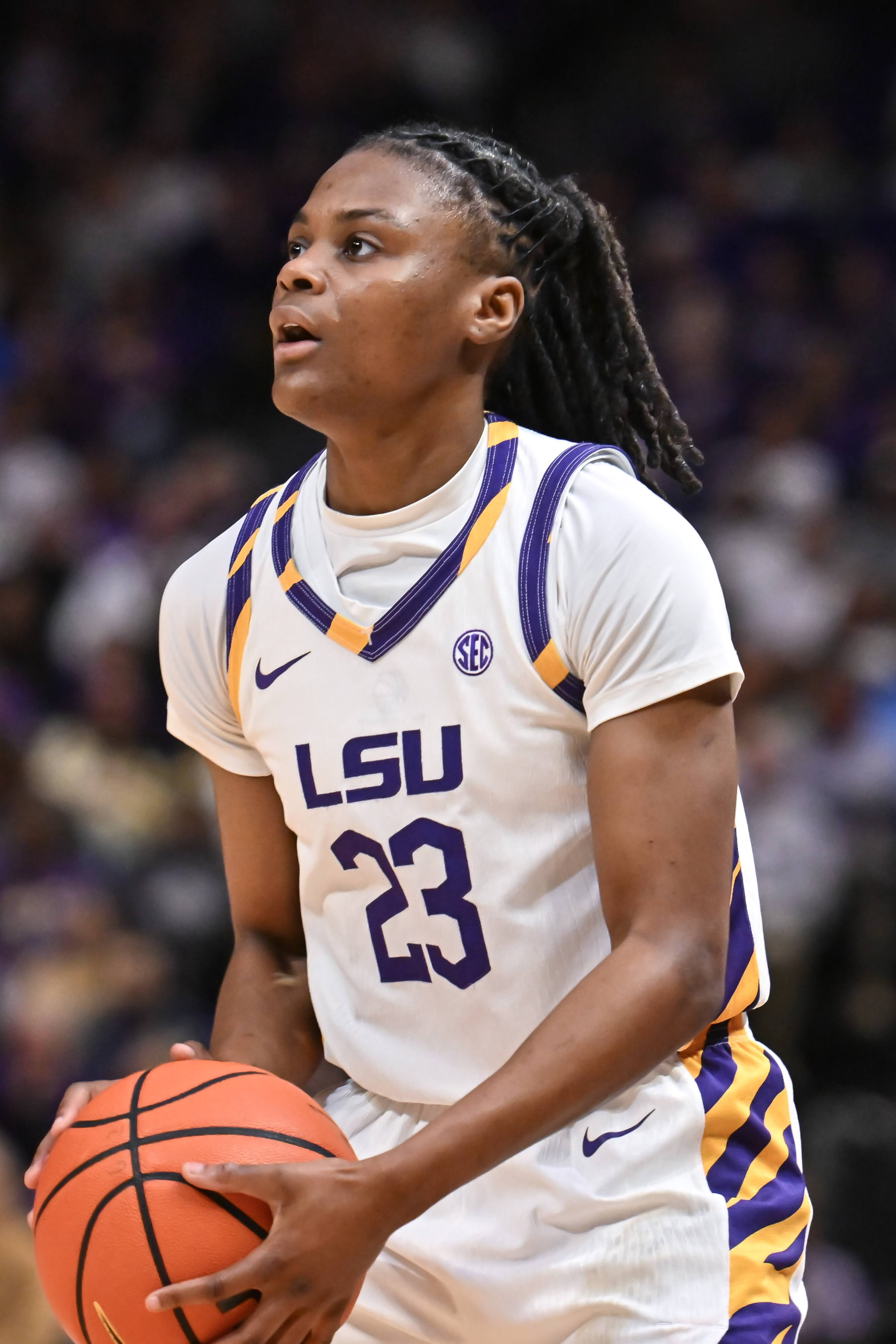
- Fulwiley with LSU in 2026

No. 23 – LSU Tigers
- Position: Guard
- League: Southeastern Conference

Personal information
- Born: April 21, 2005 (age 21)
- Listed height: 5 ft 10 in (1.78 m)

Career information
- High school: W. J. Keenan (Columbia, South Carolina)
- College: South Carolina (2023–2025); LSU (2025–present)

Career highlights
- NCAA champion (2024); 2× SEC Sixth Player of the Year (2025, 2026); Second-team All-SEC (2025); SEC All-Freshman Team (2024); SEC tournament MVP (2024); McDonald's All-American (2023)
Medals
Representing the United States
Women's 3x3 basketball
FIBA 3x3 World Cup
Gold medal – first place	2026 Warsaw	Team

MiLaysia Fulwiley (born April 21, 2005) is an American college basketball player for the LSU Tigers of the Southeastern Conference (SEC).

== High school career ==
Fulwiley played basketball for W. J. Keenan High School in Columbia, South Carolina. In seventh grade, she was called up to varsity team for the playoffs and helped Keenan win the Class 2A state championship. Fulwiley won four state titles in six seasons with the team and left as its all-time leading scorer. As a senior, she was selected to play in the McDonald's All-American Game. Rated a five-star recruit by ESPN, Fulwiley committed to play college basketball for South Carolina over offers from Florida, Louisville and Ole Miss, among others. She was offered by the Gamecocks during seventh grade.

== College career ==
On November 6, 2023, Fulwiley made her debut for South Carolina, recording 17 points, six assists and six steals in a 100–71 win over AP No. 10 Notre Dame. She was named to the Southeastern Conference (SEC) All-Freshman Team. Fulwiley helped her team win the SEC tournament, where she was named MVP after scoring a season-high 24 points in a 79–72 win over AP No. 8 LSU in the final. Fulwiley was part of an undefeated South Carolina team that won the 2024 national championship.

Fulwiley was the second-leading scorer on the team with 11.7 points per game. On February 23, 2025, she scored a career-high 24 points against Vanderbilt. Fulwiley was on the SEC All-Tournament Team, averaging 13 points, 3.3 assists, and 2.8 steals per game. In the postseason, she won SEC Sixth Player of the Year, and was named an Honorable Mention All-American by the Associated Press. In the Sweet Sixteen, Fulwiley scored 23 points against Maryland, scoring 11 in the fourth quarter to win 71–67. She was named to the NCAA All-Regional Team. In April 2025, Fulwiley transferred to LSU.

== Career statistics ==
Legend
GP	Games played	GS	Games started	MPG	Minutes per game	RPG	Rebounds per game
APG	Assists per game	SPG	Steals per game	BPG	Blocks per game	PPG	Points per game
TO	Turnovers per game	FG%	Field-goal percentage	3P%	3-point field-goal percentage	FT%	Free-throw percentage
**Bold**	Career best	°	League leader

=== College ===
Year	Team	GP	GS	MPG	FG%	3P%	FT%	RPG	APG	SPG	BPG	TO	PPG
2023–24	South Carolina	38	**3**	18.4	**43.8**	**34.3**	**78.2**	**2.9**	**2.2**	**1.7**	0.7	**1.7**	11.7
2024–25	South Carolina	38	0	**18.9**	42.4	25.8	77.5	2.8	1.9	1.5	**0.8**	1.9	**11.8**
**Career**		76	3	18.7	43.1	30.3	77.8	2.9	2.0	1.6	0.8	1.8	11.8
Statistics retrieved from Sports-Reference.

== Off the court ==
=== Business interests ===
On March 15, 2024, Fulwiley became the first college athlete to sign a name, image and likeness deal with Curry Brand.

On July 21, 2025, Fulwiley was signed by Unrivaled, a 3x3 basketball league, to NIL deals as part of "The Future is Unrivaled Class of 2025".

=== In popular culture ===
In April 2024, Fulwiley attended Kelsey Plum's second annual Dawg Class, a 3-day camp with the purpose of helping top women college athletes transition from collegiate to professional basketball. The 2024 camp was held at the IMG Academy and sponsored by Under Armour.

=== Legal troubles ===
On November 14, 2026, Fulwiley was arrested in Baton Rouge, facing charges of aggravated battery, flight from an officer, aggravated assault, and resisting an officer. She was held on $20,000 bond at East Baton Rouge Parish Prison. LSU had no comment at the time of arrest.
