= Phoenix P-12 Community College =

Phoenix P–12 Community College

Location
- Hertford Street, Sebastopol; Ballarat, Australia, Victoria, 3356; Australia; 37.5875°S 143.8344°E

Information
- Type: State, co-educational, day school
- Motto: In Knowledge there is Opportunity
- Established: 2011
- School number: 8900
- Principal: Karen Snibson
- Teaching staff: 100
- Years offered: P–12
- Gender: Co-educational
- Enrolment: 1604 (2021)
- Colours: Purple, gold and black
- Affiliation: Ballarat Associated Schools
- Website: http://www.phoenix.vic.edu.au/

Phoenix P–12 Community College is a school located in the Ballarat suburb of Sebastopol, Victoria, Australia. It formed in 2011 with the amalgamation of Sebastopol College and Redan Primary School. The school was named after the Phoenix mine, located south of the school.

== Curriculum ==
The College has eight Key Learning Areas which are accessible to all students. The school is involved in the Bright Futures program and has curriculum program links with primary schools and further education providers.

=== Grades Prep to 6 ===
The Redan Campus of Phoenix P–12 Community College caters for children from Prep to Grade 6.

=== Years 7 to 10 ===
Students entering Year 7 can learn Chinese, and have the opportunity to experience a broad range of Arts, Technology, Music and Physical Education programs.

=== Years 10 to 12 ===
Students can undertake VCE, VET and VCAL studies. Arrangements with Technical and Further Education (TAFE) providers enable “credit transfer” and “dual recognition” of studies and programs provided at the College.

== Sport ==
PCC is a member of the Ballarat Associated Schools (BAS).

== Notable alumni ==
- Paul Jenkins, former Australian politician of the Liberal Party
- Erin Carroll, Australian badminton player

== See also ==
- List of schools in Ballarat
- List of schools in Victoria
- List of high schools in Victoria
- Victorian Certificate of Education
- Education in Ballarat
