= Georgia Amoore =

Australian basketball player (born 2001)

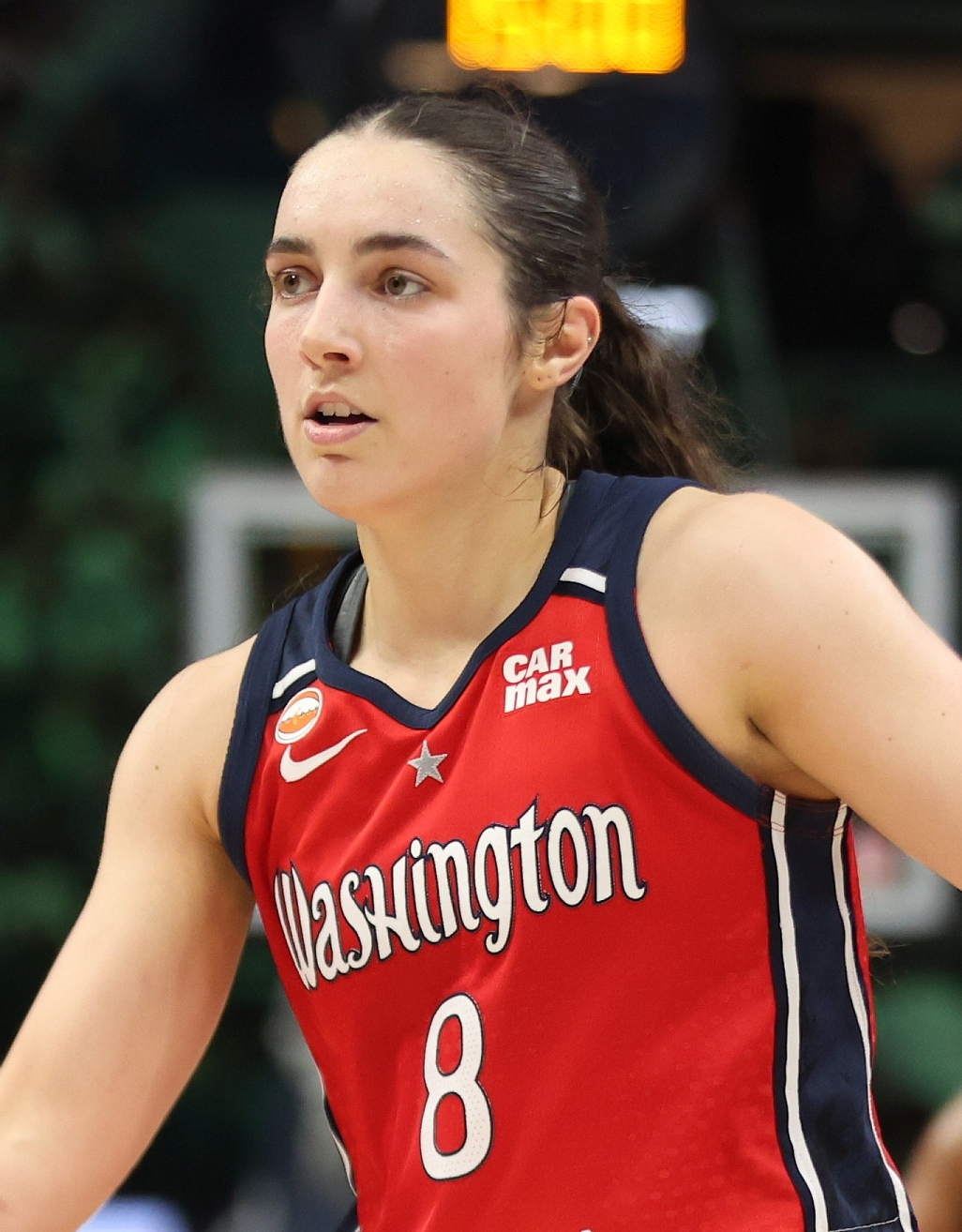
- Amoore with the Washington Mystics in 2026

No. 5 – Perth Lynx
- Position: Point guard
- League: WNBL

Personal information
- Born: 3 April 2001 (age 25) Ballarat, Victoria, Australia
- Listed height: 5 ft 6 in (1.68 m)
- Listed weight: 155 lb (70 kg)

Career information
- High school: Loreto College (Ballarat, Victoria)
- College: Virginia Tech (2020–2024); Kentucky (2024–2025)
- WNBA draft: 2025: 1st round, 6th overall pick
- Drafted by: Washington Mystics
- Playing career: 2017–present

Career history
- 2017–2019: Ballarat Rush
- 2025–present: Washington Mystics
- 2026–present: Perth Lynx

Career highlights
- All-American – WBCA (2025); Second-team All-American – AP, USBWA (2025); Third-team All-American – AP, USBWA (2024); First-team All-SEC (2025); 2× First-team All-ACC (2023, 2024); ACC All-Freshman Team (2021); ACC tournament MVP (2023)
- Stats at Basketball Reference
Medals
Women's basketball
Representing Australia
FIBA Under-17 World Cup
Bronze medal – third place	2018 Belarus	Team
FIBA Under-16 Asian Championship
Gold medal – first place	2017 India	Team
Women's 3x3 basketball
Representing Australia
FIBA 3x3 Under-18 Asia Cup
Gold medal – first place	2019 Malaysia	Team

Georgia Lee Amoore (born 3 April 2001) is an Australian professional basketball player for the Perth Lynx of the Women's National Basketball League (WNBL). She is also contracted with the Washington Mystics of the Women's National Basketball Association (WNBA). She played college basketball for Virginia Tech and Kentucky. Amoore was selected sixth overall by the Mystics in the 2025 WNBA draft.

== Early life and career ==
A native of Ballarat, Victoria, Amoore grew up playing several sports, including Australian rules football, taekwondo, cricket, futsal, athletics, before focusing on basketball at age 17. She attended Loreto College and competed for her state team Victoria Country at the youth level. Amoore played for the Ballarat Rush in the South East Australian Basketball League (SEABL) in 2017 and 2018. She then played for the Rush, now in the NBL1, in the 2019 season and averaged 11.2 points, 2.6 rebounds and 3.2 assists in 18 games.

== College career ==
Amoore committed to play college basketball in the United States for Virginia Tech over an offer from Portland.

As a freshman at Virginia Tech, Amoore averaged 11.8 points and 4.6 assists per game, and was an Atlantic Coast Conference (ACC) All-Freshman Team selection. In her sophomore season, she averaged 11.2 points and 4.4 assists per game, making the All-ACC honorable mention. On 1 December 2022, Amoore recorded the first triple-double in program history, with 24 points, 11 assists and 10 rebounds in an 85–54 win over Nebraska. She was named first-team All-ACC. Amoore led Virginia Tech to its first ACC tournament title in 2023, where she was named MVP and made a tournament-record 14 three-pointers. She helped her team earn a one-seed in the 2023 NCAA tournament, and in the first round, she surpassed the program single-season record for three-pointers. In the Sweet 16, Amoore scored a season-high 29 points in a 73–64 win over Tennessee, helping the Hokies reach their first Elite Eight. She was named most outstanding player of the Seattle 3 Regional. In the Final Four, Amoore scored 17 points and surpassed the record for three-pointers in a single NCAA tournament in a 79–72 loss to LSU. As a junior, Amoore averaged 16.3 points, 4.9 assists and three rebounds per game. She ranked second in the NCAA Division I to Caitlin Clark in three-pointers made. On 16 November 2023, Amoore scored 10 points and had a program-record 16 assists in a 105–36 win over Houston Christian. On 25 February 2024, Amoore became the all-time assist leader in Virginia Tech basketball history.

In April 2024, Amoore transferred to Kentucky to reunite with coach Kenny Brooks. Amoore was eligible to declare for the WNBA draft but also has a fifth and final season of collegiate eligibility remaining, as the NCAA granted student-athletes a waiver for an extra year of competition during the COVID-19 pandemic. In the 2024–25 NCAA season, she started 31 games for the Wildcats and averaged 19.6 points per game.

== Professional career ==
On 14 April 2025, Amoore was selected with the sixth overall pick in the 2025 WNBA draft by the Washington Mystics. Less than a week into training camp, Amoore suffered an ACL injury and was subsequently ruled out of the entire 2025 season.

In her WNBA debut on 8 May 2026, Amoore recorded six points, three rebounds, three assists and two steals in 20 minutes in a 68–65 win over the Toronto Tempo. On 27 August 2026, she scored 16 of her career-high 25 points in the fourth quarter of the Mystics' 80–73 win over the Phoenix Mercury, finishing with a career-high six 3-pointers.

On 28 August 2026, Amoore signed with the Perth Lynx of the Women's National Basketball League (WNBL) for the 2026–27 season.

== National team career ==
Amoore won a gold medal with the Australian national under-16 team at the 2017 FIBA U16 Women's Asian Championship in India. She recorded 10 points, four rebounds and two assists in a 61–60 win over Japan in the final. Amoore played in the 2018 FIBA Under-17 Women's Basketball World Cup in Belarus, where she helped her team win the bronze medal.

In 3x3 basketball, Amoore helped Australia win the gold medal at the 2019 FIBA 3x3 Under-18 Asia Cup in Malaysia.

== Career statistics ==
Legend
GP	Games played	GS	Games started	MPG	Minutes per game	RPG	Rebounds per game
APG	Assists per game	SPG	Steals per game	BPG	Blocks per game	PPG	Points per game
TO	Turnovers per game	FG%	Field-goal percentage	3P%	3-point field-goal percentage	FT%	Free-throw percentage
**Bold**	Career best	°	League leader

=== College ===
Year	Team	GP	GS	MPG	FG%	3P%	FT%	RPG	APG	SPG	BPG	TO	PPG
2020–21	Virginia Tech	25	23	31.5	38.9	39.6	82.9	2.4	4.6	.8	.2	3.0	11.8
2021–22	Virginia Tech	33	33	33.2	40.3	**40.0**	80.0	2.4	4.4	**1.0**	.0	**2.3**	11.2
2022–23	Virginia Tech	**36**	**36**	**36.7**	37.9	34.5	80.0	**3.0**	4.9	.7	.1	2.8	16.3
2023–24	Virginia Tech	32	32	34.9	41.2	33.5	**85.9**	2.6	6.8	.9	**.4**	3.4	18.8
2024–25	Kentucky	31	31	**36.7**	**42.3**	33.6	83.7	2.3	**6.9**	**1.0**	**.4**	3.1	**19.6**
**Career**		157	155	34.8	40.3	35.6	82.6	2.5	5.5	.9	.2	2.9	15.7

== Personal life ==
Amoore's mother is a horse trainer. Amoore's cousin, Keeley Frawley, is a former University of Portland women's basketball player.

From 2023 to 2025, Amoore attended Kelsey Plum's Dawg Class, an Under Armour-sponsored camp to help top women college athletes transition from collegiate to professional basketball.
