= Rachel Webster =

Australian astrophysicist

- Education: Monash University; University of Sussex (M.S.c); University of Cambridge (Ph.D.)
- Scientific career
- Fields: astrophysics
- Doctoral students: Virginia Kilborn; Matt O'Dowd (astrophysicist); Emma Ryan-Weber; Alicia Oshlack

Rachel Lindsey Webster AO FAA (born 3 July 1951), is an Australian astrophysicist who became the second female professor of physics in Australia. Her main focus areas are extragalactic astronomy and cosmology; she researches black holes and the first stars of the universe. Webster has a doctoral degree from Cambridge University and has held postdoctoral positions at the University of Toronto and University of Melbourne.

== Early life ==
Rachel Webster was born in North East Victoria. She began her schooling at Tallangatta Primary School and then moved to Melbourne at the age of six, where she attended Blackburn South Primary School and later Presbyterian Ladies' College in Melbourne. Her father was an engineer and her mother a geography teacher; both encouraged Webster's interest in physics, science and mathematics from a young age. Webster was inspired to pursue astronomy after she attended a lecture at the University of Sydney in her final year of school. The lecture was on cosmology, presented by Robert May, one of Australia's most celebrated scientists.

== Career ==
Webster graduated from Monash University in Melbourne in 1975 with a degree in astrophysics. However, let down by her experiences in the university, Webster found herself within the Victorian Government's Public Works department, where she bought and sold real estate. After four years of success in that work, in her mid twenties Webster realised that she was not being completely fulfilled. This lead her to write to Martin Rees, the head of astronomy at Cambridge University, who encouraged her to gain a master's degree in physics prior to being enrolled. Webster completed an MSc at the University of Sussex in 1980 and, in 1985, completed her PhD on Gravitational Lensing and Cosmology at Cambridge University. She then undertook a postdoctoral position at the University of Toronto focussing on the Einstein Cross, a gravitationally lensed quasar.

In 1992, Webster returned to the University of Melbourne, where she received a grant for research related to the Parkes Quasar Survey. She was primarily concerned with how galaxies bend light, known as gravitational lensing. Today, her research group uses equipment including the Australia Telescope Compact Array, the Gemini telescopes, the Hubble Space Telescope and the Chandra X-Ray Observatory. Webster is a member of the International Consortium, helping to design a new low-frequency radio telescope, to be installed in Western Australia. Webster's ultimate aim is to identify the first sources of the universe. This information is being uncovered via her studies and detection of reionised hydrogen atoms and the structural analysis of neutral hydrogen clouds. She has also conducted research into quasar emission regions, cosmology, the Murchison Widefield Array and dark matter.

Webster has been the chair of the National Committee of Astronomy and co-created a Women in Physics Program, which has helped increase the number of women graduating in physics at the University of Melbourne.

== Honours and awards ==
- 2020 Officer of the Order of Australia
- 2017 Fellow of the Australian Academy of Science
- 2010 Victorian Honour Roll of Women
- 2008 Member of the Royal Society of Victoria
- 2007 Fellow of the Australian Institute of Physics
- 1998 Fellow of the International Astronomical Union
- 1997 Inaugural Australian Institute of Physics Women in Physics Lecture
- 1988 Member of the American Astronomical Society

Webster is also a former President of Academic Board at The University of Melbourne and has been awarded the Robert Ellery Lectureship.
