= Cameron Richardson (footballer) =

Australian rules footballer (born 1987)

Personal information
- Born: 2 December 1987 (age 38)
- Original team: Gold Coast
- Draft: No. 17, 2010 National Draft, North Melbourne
- Height: 189 cm (6 ft 2 in)
- Weight: 83 kg (183 lb)

Playing career^{1}
Years	Club	Games (Goals)
2011– 2013	North Melbourne	8 (1)
- ^{1} Playing statistics correct to the end of 2013.

Cameron Richardson (born 2 December 1987) is a former Australian rules footballer who played for the North Melbourne Football Club in the Australian Football League (AFL).

He was pre-selected by the new Gold Coast side and on-traded to North Melbourne in return for the 35th selection in the 2010 AFL draft from the North Ballarat Football Club in the Victorian Football League. He made his AFL debut in Round 1 of the 2011 AFL season and played four consecutive games with the club before being dropped to the VFL.

He attended school at Damascus College Ballarat.
