= Ballarat Clarendon College =

Coordinates: 37°33′31″S 143°51′04″E

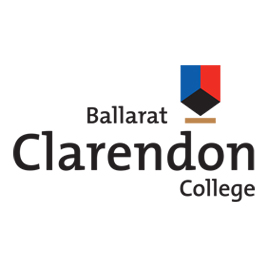
- Ballarat, Victoria; Australia

Information
- Type: private school, co-educational, day & boarding
- Motto: E Studis Viridis et Claritas (Out of Enthusiastic Endeavors Come Truth and Understanding)
- Denomination: In association with the Uniting Church of Australia
- Established: 1864 (Ballarat College) & 1868 (Clarendon College)
- School number: 278
- Principal: Jen Bourke
- Key people: William Henderson (Founder); Elizabeth Kennedy (Founder)
- Years offered: ELC–12
- Gender: Co-educational
- Enrolment: 1710
- Houses: Prep - Year 4: Sloan, Thwaites, Shaw Years 5-6: Horner, McPherson, Polson, Ross, Waters Years 7-12: Cairns, Elliot, Garbutt, Godbehear, Henderson, Kennedy, Sloss, Walker
- Colours: Red, black, gold, blue
- VCE average: 37
- Affiliation: Ballarat Associated Schools
- Website: www.clarendon.vic.edu.au

Ballarat Clarendon College is a private, co-educational, day and boarding school, located in Ballarat, Victoria, Australia. The school has been the subject of legal action and media reporting concerning child protection, staff welfare, and governance issues. Formerly affiliated with the Presbyterian Church of Australia, it now operates in association with the Uniting Church in Australia (but is not governed or managed by the Church) and is a member of the Ballarat Associated Schools.

== History ==
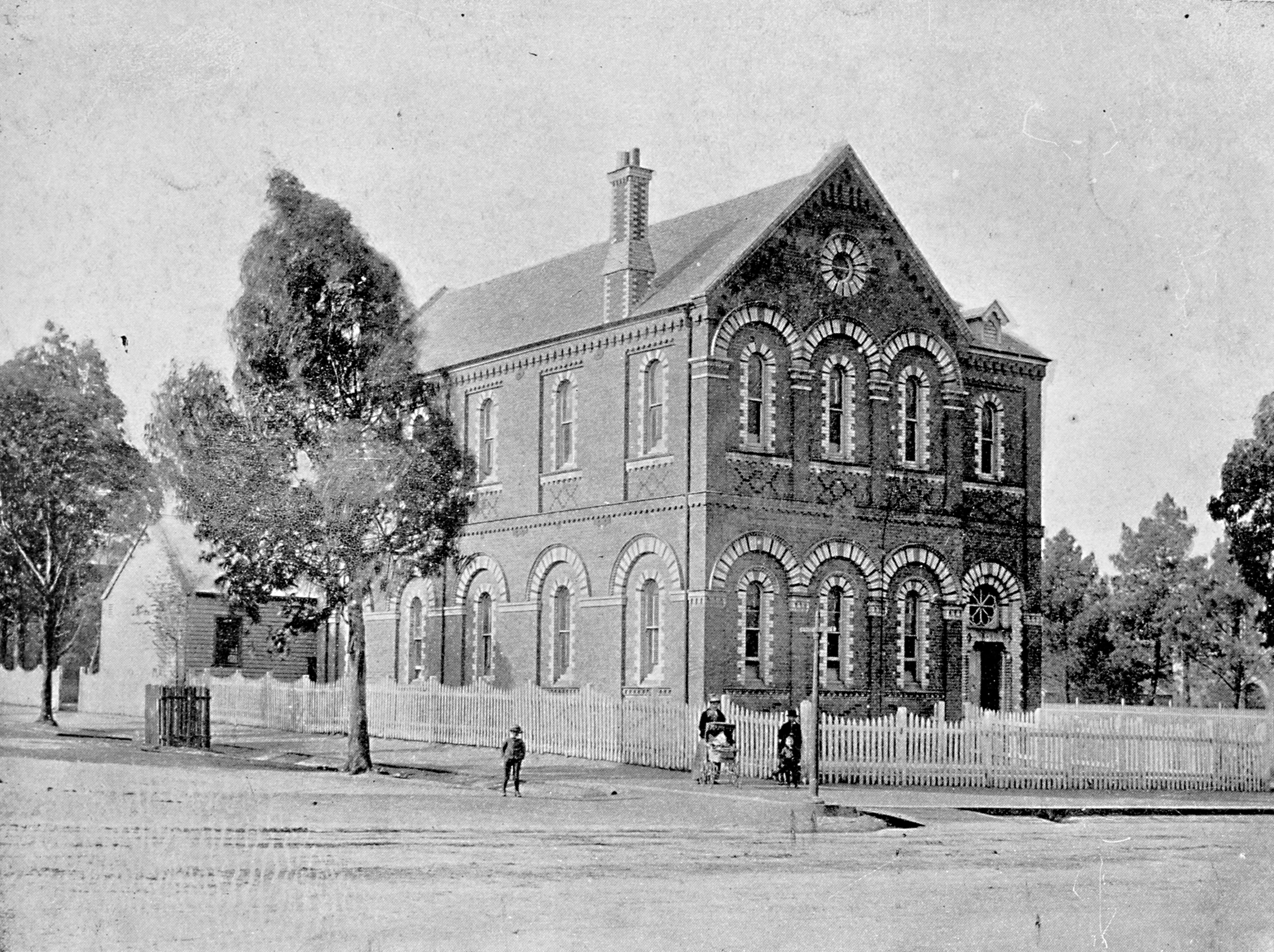
Ballarat College campus, early 20th century (State Library Victoria)

Ballarat Clarendon College was established in 1974 through the amalgamation of Ballarat College (founded 1864) and Clarendon Presbyterian Ladies’ College (founded 1876).

=== Ballarat College ===
Ballarat College was founded in 1864 as part of a Presbyterian initiative to establish secondary education in regional Victoria. Enrolments increased rapidly in its early years, and the school became established by the late 1860s despite financial and organisational challenges.

From 1877 to 1909, the College was led by principal John Garbutt, during which time enrolments grew and a structured curriculum was introduced. In 1912, the school relocated to a purpose-built campus on Sturt Street designed by architect Percy Richards.

The College contributed to Australia’s war effort during the First World War, with a number of former students serving in the armed forces. Enrolments fluctuated during the interwar period but recovered following the Second World War.

From the 1950s, the school expanded its facilities and enrolments. By the 1960s, it offered a broad academic and extracurricular program prior to the eventual merger in 1974.

=== Clarendon Presbyterian Ladies’ College ===
Clarendon Presbyterian Ladies’ College was founded in 1876 by Elizabeth Kennedy in Ballarat. The school initially operated from a private residence before relocating to purpose-built premises at Soldier’s Hill.

The school expanded in the late nineteenth and early twentieth centuries, and in 1919 was acquired by the Presbyterian Church of Victoria and renamed Clarendon Presbyterian Ladies’ College. A new campus was established in Mair Street during the 1920s as enrolments increased.

Enrolments continued to grow through the mid-twentieth century, supported by academic and sporting programs. By the early 1970s, declining enrolments led to discussions regarding amalgamation with Ballarat College.

=== Amalgamation and development ===
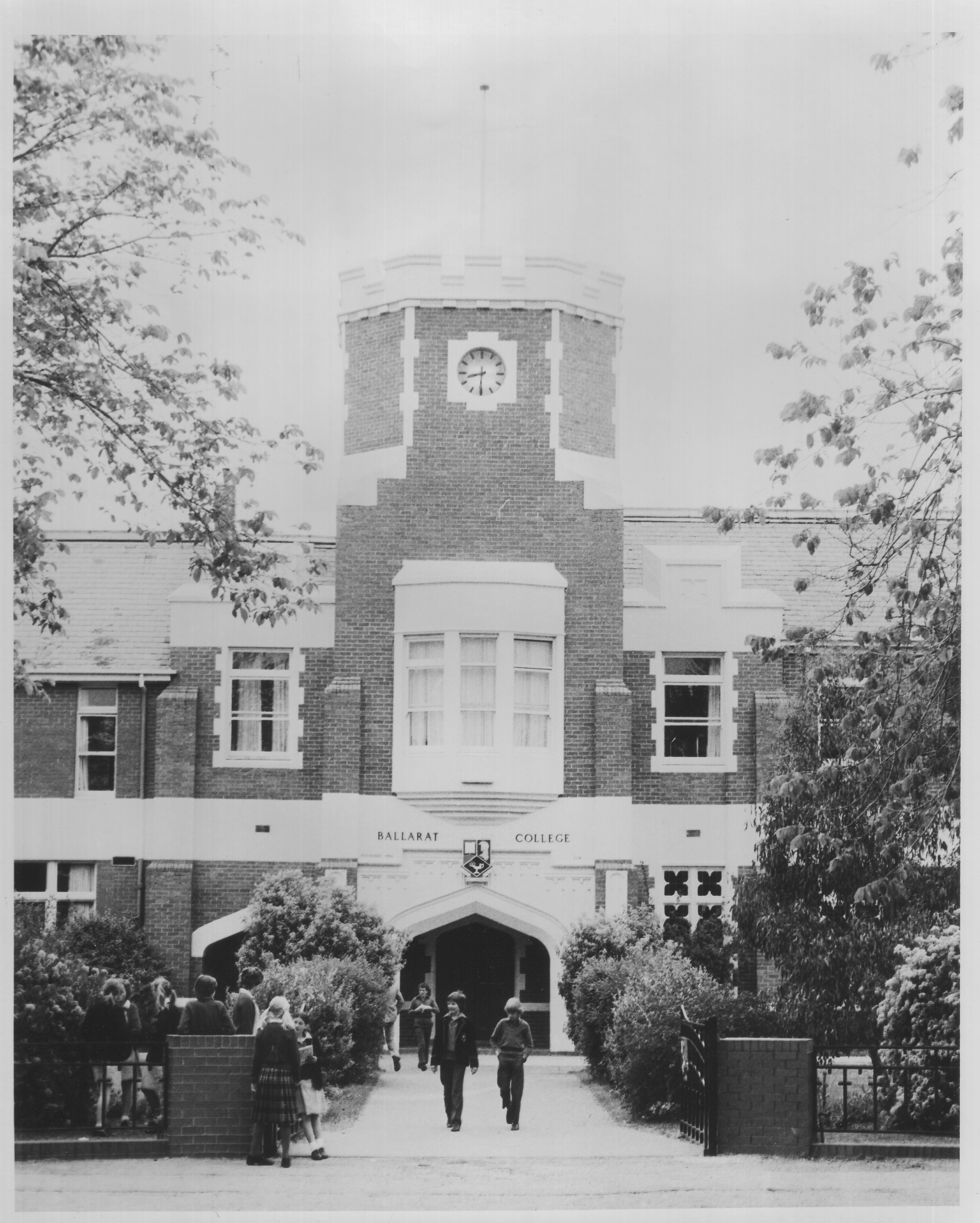
Ballarat College campus, early 20th century (State Library Victoria)

Ballarat and Clarendon College was formed in January 1974 through the amalgamation of the two schools, initially operating across the Sturt Street and Mair Street campuses. Leadership was initially shared between the principals of the former schools.

During the 1970s and 1980s, the College developed as a co-educational institution, with facilities expanded and enrolments increasing. In 1993, a reorganisation of campus use saw junior classes moved to Mair Street and senior classes consolidated at Sturt Street.

Further development occurred from the late 1990s onwards, including campus upgrades and organisational changes. The College was rebranded in 2008, and by the early 2010s enrolments had grown to over 1,300 students.

In 2014, the College marked the 150th anniversary of its earliest predecessor institution. Ongoing development has continued into the twenty-first century, including expansion of facilities and the establishment of the Yuulong Remote Schooling Campus in 2022.

== Controversy ==
Media investigations in 2022 reported concerns about culture and wellbeing at the College. A parent undergoing chemotherapy described the primary school environment as “emotionally unsafe” and alleged that she was “categorically” asked for a financial payoff to ensure her child’s safety. Teachers also alleged loss of toilet and lunch breaks, constant pressure (“they are constantly grilling you”), and a culture that contributed to mental health strain.

In one widely reported incident, a teacher insulted students’ VCE essays and said reading them made her “want to kill herself,” which colleagues described as reflecting “a ruthless, arrogant, blinkered, and incestuous culture.” Media reports also noted that internal investigations were conducted by individuals with close connections to the Board, raising concerns about independence and transparency.

== Co-curriculum ==
=== Sport ===
The college participates in many sports both within and outside the Ballarat Associated Schools.

==== BAS premierships ====
BCC has won the following BAS premierships.

Combined:

- Athletics (12) – 1980, 1981, 1982, 1983, 1984, 1985, 1988, 1989, 1992, 1993, 1994, 1996
- Badminton (3) – 1982, 1990, 1991
- Cross Country (3) – 1980, 1981, 2011
- Lap of the Lake (2) – 1980, 1981

Boys:

- Athletics (2) – 1983, 1989
- Basketball (7) – 1982, 1984, 1985, 1993, 1996, 2008, 2009
- Cricket (5) – 1980, 1988, 2005, 2009, 2016
- Cricket T20 – 2015
- Cross Country – 1985
- Football (4) – 1980, 2002, 2005, 2006
- Hockey (8) – 1985, 1995, 1997, 1998, 2006, 2016, 2017, 2018
- Rowing premiership, Harold Deveson Cup (8) – 1975, 1976, 1988, 1990, 1991, 1998, 2021, 2022
- Soccer (7) – 1979, 1980, 1999, 2006, 2007, 2011, 2015
- Tennis (5) – 1977, 2006, 2007, 2011, 2013
- Volleyball (5) – 2007, 2008, 2009, 2010, 2020

Girls:

- Athletics (12) – 1980, 1981, 1982, 1983, 1985, 1986, 1988, 1989, 1992, 1993, 1994, 1996
- Badminton (2) – 2011, 2012
- Basketball (6) – 1990, 2001, 2011, 2013, 2016, 2017
- Cricket (4) – 1985, 1998, 2020, 2021
- Cross Country (6) – 1980, 1981, 1993, 2004, 2005, 2011
- Football (14) – 1996, 1997, 1998, 2002, 2003, 2004, 2005, 2006, 2007, 2009, 2010, 2011, 2012, 2013
- Head of the Lake, Patterson Shield (14) – 1981, 1983, 1984, 1989, 2002, 2005, 2008, 2010, 2011, 2014, 2015, 2021, 2022
- Hockey (21) – 1974, 1975, 1979, 1980, 1982, 1983, 1984, 1985, 1986, 1987, 1989, 1991, 1996, 1998, 2010, 2012, 2013, 2014, 2015, 2016, 2018
- Lap of the Lake (7) – 1980, 1981, 2005, 2006, 2007, 2008, 2011
- Netball (13) – 1984, 1986, 1987, 1988, 1989, 1993, 2003, 2004, 2007, 2011, 2012, 2017, 2019
- Road Relay (3) – 1999, 2005, 2008
- Rowing Premiership, J H Netherway Cup (11) – 1981, 1984, 1989, 1990, 2008, 2009, 2010, 2011*, 2013, 2014, 2021, 2022
- Soccer (2) – 2012, 2019, 2022
- Softball (10) – 1985, 1986, 1987, 1990, 1998, 2002, 2003, 2004, 2005, 2006
- Volleyball (7) – 1978, 1980, 1983, 1984, 1985, 2001, 2011

=== Performing arts ===
The school has a free standing building on the east of the senior campus where all aspects of Performing Arts take place, subsequently called, the Performing Arts Centre (PAC). From years 5–8 students partake in different Arts Classes which rotate each trimester, Music, Art and Drama or Dance (alternating each year). In year 9 students are able to choose which performing and visual arts they do for each term and Year 10 and VCE students may choose out of the various higher level VCE arts classes the school offers. Students accordingly participate in music lessons for:

- Brass – Trumpet, French Horn, Trombone, Euphonium and Tuba
- Woodwind – Flute, Clarinet (+Bass Clarinet), all Saxomaphone types, Oboe, Recorder and Bassoon
- Piano – Piano, Contemporary Piano
- Keyboard
- Guitar – Classical Guitar, Electric Guitar, Bass Guitar
- Strings – Violin, Viola, Violoncello and Double Bass
- Music Theory
- Speech Art
- Voice (Classical And Contemporary)

They may participate in any of the student ensembles at the school. They are:

- Novice Band
- The Geoff Smith Jazz Orchestra
- Concert Band
- The Barry Currie Stage Band
- Chamber Ensemble
- Orchestra
- Intermediate and Senior Strings

and numerous contemporary bands.

In addition, the college puts on an annual Senior School Production, Senior School Play and Middle School Production. They also have an annual Performing Arts Showcase performance for both the Junior and Senior School and a Middle School and Senior School Presentation Night.

== Notable alumni ==
Art

- David Davies, Artist
- Gwyn Hanssen Pigott, Ceramic artist

Defence

- Major General Harold "Pompey" Elliott, Distinguished Soldier and Senator
- Admiral Sir Guy Gaunt, Chief of British Intelligence in the US, WWII

Diplomatic service

- Sir Patrick Shaw, Australian Ambassador to Washington 1974–75

Fashion

- Joe Saba, Fashion designer

Law

- Rt Hon Lord Augustus Andrewes Uthwatt, House of Lords
- Robina Fordyce Cowper, Magistrate Children's Court, Melbourne

Performing arts/media

- Kimberley Davies, Actress
- Bill Hunter, Actor
- Elsie Morison, Soprano
- Benjamin Northey, Conductor

Politics

- John Button, Senator
- Bernard Dowiyogo, President, Nauru
- Michael Ronaldson, Senator

AFL

- Flynn Appleby, Collingwood
- Kurt Aylett, GWS Giants, Essendon
- Percy Beames, Melbourne Football Club, 1930–41 premiership teams; captain-coach 1942–44
- Jarrod Berry, Brisbane Lions
- Tom Berry, Brisbane Lions
- John Birt, Essendon Football Club, member of 1962 and 1965 premiership teams; W.S. Crichton Medalist in 1961, 1965 and 1967
- Alastair Clarkson, 2008, 2013, 2014 and 2015 Premiership coach of the Hawthorn Football Club
- Bob "Geelong Flier" Davis, Geelong Football Club, Member of 1951–52 premiership teams, Captain 1955–58, Best and Fairest 1957
- Matt Dea, Richmond & Essendon
- Willem Drew, Port Adelaide
- Jeremy Humm, AFL Footballer (West Coast & Richmond)
- Michael Jamison, Carlton Football Club
- Hugh McCluggage, Brisbane Lions
- Sebastian Ross, St Kilda
- David Shaw
- Darcy Tucker, Fremantle Football Club
- Ben Hobbs, Essendon
- Joel Freijah, Western Bulldogs

Other sport

- Percy Beames, Cricket, represented Victoria 1933–46; team captain 1946
- Graham Crouch, Athletics, Olympian Montreal 1976
- Stewart McSweyn, Athletics, Olympian
- Stefan Nigro, Football, A-League player
- Andrew Symonds, Cricket, Australian national representative
- Sara Kennedy, Cricket, Left-arm medium bowler

== See also ==
- List of schools in Ballarat
- List of schools in Victoria
- List of high schools in Victoria
- List of boarding schools
- Victorian Certificate of Education
