= Ballarat Associated Schools =

- Formation: 2003
- Headquarters: Ballarat, Victoria, Australia
- Members: 8 member schools
- Official language: English
- Website: http://bas.vic.edu.au/

The Ballarat Associated Schools (BAS), was formerly the Central Highlands Independent School Sport Association (CHISSA) until 2002 and before 1982 the Ballarat Public Schools Association (BPSA). It is a group of five independent schools and two government schools in Ballarat, Victoria, Australia. BAS provides the basis for interschool sporting competition between the seven member schools in a range of sports.

== Schools ==
=== Current member schools ===
School	Location	Principal	Enrolment	Founded	Denomination	Boys/Girls	Day/Boarding	School Colours
Ballarat Grammar School	Wendouree	Adam Heath	800	1911	Anglican	Boys & Girls	Day & Boarding	Blue, brown & gold
Ballarat Clarendon College	Ballarat	David Shepherd	1200	1864	Uniting Church	Boys & Girls	Day & Boarding	Red, black, gold & blue
Ballarat High School	Ballarat	Gary Palmer	1450	1907	None	Boys & Girls	Day	Dark blue, light blue & green
Damascus College	Mount Clear	Matthew Byrne	1000	1995	Roman Catholic	Boys & Girls	Day	Gold, navy & maroon
Loreto College	Ballarat	Michelle Brodrick	800	1875	Roman Catholic	Girls	Day	Royal blue & gold
Mount Clear College	Mount Clear	Lynita Taylor	1080	1981	None	Boys & Girls	Day	Black, red, grey and white
Phoenix P-12 Community College	Sebastopol	Karen Snibson	1409	2011	None	Boys & Girls	Day	Purple, gold & black
St Patrick's College	Ballarat	Steven O'Connor	1180	1893	Roman Catholic	Boys	Day & Boarding	Blue, green & white

== History of BPSA/CHISSA/BAS Lap of the Lake (Wendouree) 6KM Cross Country Records (Best Times) ==
- Open Boys - 18 mins 40 sec, Robert Ellis (Ballarat & Clarendon College) 1990 (=2nd Best: Steve Moneghetti/Chris Howley SPC 18.45)
- Under 16 Boys - 19 mins 00 sec, Richard Gleisner (St Patrick's College), 1987 (2nd Best: Stephen McMahon SPC 19.06, 1989)
- Under 14 Boys - 20 mins 07 sec, Stephen McMahon (St Patrick's College), 1987 (2nd Best: Chris Howley SPC 20.17, 1987)

NB. Previous Open Boys Record was 18 min 45 sec, Steve Moneghetti (St Patrick's College), 1980 - Future Olympic Marathon Runner - 1988 (5th), 1992 (48th), 1996 (7th), 2000 (10th) and Commonwealth Games and Berlin City Marathon Champion.

At the 1989 St Patrick's College School Lap of the Lake (Year 11/12 Cross Country) two (2) athletes performed faster than the then current Moneghetti CHISSA Record (Scott Carlson 18 mins 24 secs, Richard Gleisner 18 mins 39 secs with Chris Howley 18 mins 50 secs).

Stephen McMahon's 18 min 58 sec also run in 1989 created history with one school (and CHISSA/BAS) boasting four (4) Sub-19 minute Lap of the Lake Performers in the same year. Breaking the 20 Minute Barrier is considered an outstanding performance at Open School level. All 4 athletes (from St Patrick's College) claimed individual (Open) U.19 & U.20 Medals ( 1 Gold - S. McMahon, 1 Silver - C. Howley, 2 bronze - S. Carlson & R. Gleisner) at the 1989 Australian All Schools and Australian All-High Cross Country Championships in Adelaide and Sydney. Due to the 1989 CHISSA Lap of the Lake being conducted only 2 days before the Australian Schools Cross Country Championships, the above athletes ran for places not times.

At the 1989 Australian All Schools Athletics Under 17 3000 Metre (Track) - CHISSA/BAS athletes won the gold, silver, and bronze medals, with Chris Howley (SPC) 8 min 42 sec, Stephen McMahon (SPC) 8min 45 sec and Robert Ellis (BCC) 8 min 50 sec. All 3 CHISSA/BAS runners claimed individual Australian National Championships during the 1989-90 period: Robert Ellis - 1990 U.18 Club 6000M Cross Country (Hobart), Stephen McMahon - 1989 U.20 Schools 8000M (Sydney), Chris Howley - 1989 U.17 Schools 3000M Track (Adelaide).

These 3 athletes also combined with Stephen Millichamp (Ballarat High School and Victorian All-High/VSSSA U16 800/1500M Record Holder) as a Ballarat YCW Club Team that claimed both the Victorian and Australian Under 18 4 x 800 M (7 mins 48.7 sec) and 4 x 1500 M (16 mins 4.1 secs) Relay Records on 17 & 19 December 1989 at Olympic Park.

For several years, it was claimed that it was harder to win BPSA/CHISSA/BAS Lap of the Lake/Cross Country than National Championships, such was the depth and strength of the BAS School competition with large numbers of boys and girls in the Victorian Representative Cross Country Team. This group of athletes also re-wrote the BPSA/CHISSA/BAS Athletics distance records at 800M, 1500M & 3000M.

== BAS/AGSV Sport Competition ==
A Football match was organised between the Ballarat Public Schools Association (BPSA) and the Associated Grammar Schools of Victoria in 1961. This proved successful and the following year Cricket and Tennis were introduced. In the 1990s Basketball, Badminton and Cross Country became part of the programme.

- Badminton
- Basketball
- Bowls (Lawn)
- Cricket
- Cross Country
- Football
- Rowing
- Tennis
- Volleyball
- Field Hockey

== See also ==
- List of schools in Victoria
