= Robina Fordyce Cowper =

Australian church worker and women's rights advocate

- Born: Robina Inglis; 18 August 1866; Sandridge, Port Melbourne
- Died: 3 August 1948 (aged 81); Parramatta
- Occupations: Temperance activist, magistrate, church worker

Robina Fordyce Cowper (18 August 1866 – 3 August 1948) was an Australian women's rights activist, magistrate and temperance advocate.

== Early life ==
Cowper was the eldest of twelve children born to Mary (née Fordyce) and John Inglis. She was educated at Clarendon College, Ballarat. In 1884 she matriculated from the University of Melbourne in the Modern Languages class.

== Marriage ==
On 10 January 1891 she married Charles William Cowper. Her father officiated at the ceremony. Robina and Charles had one daughter, Mary Inglis Cowper (known as May) who was born in 1892 and died aged 3 years and 8 months, in 1895.

== Activism ==
Cowper campaigned for more women in the police force, and for the inclusion of women in church leadership.

Cowper was an active member of the Collins Street Independent Church and was the first woman on the executive of the Congregational Union committee. She was also a founding member of executive of the Congregational Women's Association.

In 1928, Cowper was appointed as a special magistrate of the Children's Court, Melbourne.
