= Ballarat Grammar School =

Ballarat Grammar

Location
- 201 Forest Street, Wendouree, Victoria, 3355; Australia; 37°32′22.52″S 143°49′52.23″E

Information
- Type: private school, co-educational, day & boarding
- Motto: Latin: Honores Laborem Sequuntur (Honour Follows Labour)
- Denomination: Anglican
- Established: 1911
- School number: 928
- Chairperson: Shantini Deutscher
- Headmaster: Adam Heath
- Chaplain: Rev'd Keith Romanis
- Grades: ELC–12
- Gender: Co-educational
- Enrolment: 1537
- Colours: Blue, brown & gold
- Slogan: Learning to Thrive, Engaged in the World.
- Song: Serva Fidem (To the tune of Holst's "Jupiter Hymn")
- VCE average: 32
- Publication: Boomalacka
- Yearbook: The Grammarian
- Affiliation: Ballarat Associated Schools
- Alumni: Old Ballarat Grammarians
- Website: www.bgs.vic.edu.au

Ballarat and Queen's Anglican Grammar School is a private, co-educational, Anglican, day and boarding school located in Wendouree (Ballarat), Victoria, Australia.

== History ==
Originally known as 'Ballarat Church of England Grammar School for Boys', Ballarat Grammar School was opened by Bishop Browne on the current Forest Street site in 1911. The Church of England Girls' Grammar School was acquired by the Anglican Diocese in 1918 having formerly been Queen's College which was established 1877, and later having "Queen's" once again included in the name.

The two schools amalgamated in 1973, and became Ballarat and Queen’s Anglican Grammar School on the Forest Street site.

=== Controversies ===
In March 2025, some students have come forward with allegations that "included physical and sexual abuse" and that they were forced to watch pornographic materials.

== Headmasters ==
The first headmaster of Ballarat Grammar was Percy Ansell Robin. Other notable headmasters include G. F. J. Dart.

Adam Heath has been the headmaster since 2016. Before that he had been middle school principal at Kristin School in Auckland, New Zealand. Heath studied outdoor education at La Trobe University and, more recently, he completed a master's degree in school leadership with first-class honours at the University of Melbourne. After early teaching in Mallacoota and the UK, Heath joined Caulfield Grammar as head of the Yarra Junction Campus. In 2005, he was appointed as the founding head of middle school at Scotch Oakburn College in Launceston.

Previous to Adam Heath, Stephen Higgs was the headmaster of Ballarat Grammar for 21 years.

== Campus ==
Ballarat and Queen's Anglican Grammar School's main campus is located in Ballarat, on the corner of Howitt and Forest streets, Wendouree. The expansive campus stretches as far north as Norman Street, and west towards Dare Street. Both the Senior School and Junior School are situated on the same campus, sharing many facilities and resources. The Wendouree Centre for Performing Arts is accessed by students via the southern part of the campus, and by the general public via Howitt St.

The Wendouree Centre for Performing Arts (WCPA) was opened in 2006 through a partnership between the school and the wider Ballarat community. It is used by the school and also hosts community events and performances. Ballarat Grammar's Music School is located within the WCPA, featuring tutorial and rehearsal rooms and a professional recording suite.

The Heinz Centre is a Year 9 Environmental Centre, opened in 2001. The centre was the venue for the Sustainable Building Expo held in 2002 as part of World Environment Week. It won the 2002 BEN Environment Award.

The school also has a farming campus at Mount Rowan. This campus is used by grade 4 students and VCE Agriculture-Horticulture students.

The schools City Cite is their campus in the Melbourne CBD and students in year 9 will attend this campus for three weeks in term 4.

Ballarat and Queens Anglican Grammar School is a sister school to St Augustine's High School, an Anglican Mission boarding school in Punjabi, Zimbabwe.

== Academic standing ==
Academic year	2007	2008	2009	2010	2011	2012	2013	2014	2015	2016
Better Education Rank (Independent schools)	45th	38th	48th	59th	69th	80th	73rd	55th	75th	100th
Median VCE score	34	34	34	33	33	33	33	34	33	32
Percentage of VCE scores 40+	19%	22%	17%	16%	15.7%	11.5%	14.4%	15.9%	12.7%	9.4%

== Sport ==
Rowing is considered by many to be the school's most celebrated sport. The Ballarat Associated Schools (BAS) crews compete in the annual "Head of the Lake", which is held at Lake Wendouree.

The Ballarat Grammar Senior Girls Australian Rules Football team has had great success in recent years, winning the Ballarat Associated Schools (BAS) Premiership every year since 2013. Coached by teacher Matt Hanlon, the team was first successful in the AFL Victoria Herald Sun Shield (HSS) Championship in 2014, where they claimed the School Girls Division 1 title. The best on ground for the 2015 game was Rene Caris who was drafted to the Geelong Football Club in the 2018 AFL Women's draft. In 2016 and 2017, the Ballarat Grammar Senior Girls Football team triumphed in the Herald Sun Shield claiming Division 1 titles in successive years at RAMS Arena and the MCG respectively. In 2017, Lauren Butler, who was drafted to the Collingwood Football Club in the 2018 AFL Women's draft, was named best on ground in the Herald Sun Shield Grand Final.

Renee Saulitis is one of the most recent draftees to the AFLW competition from the Ballarat Grammar Australian Rules Football program, having been drafted to the St Kilda Football Club with pick 34 in the 2020 AFL Women's draft. Maggie Caris, younger sister of Rene Caris of the Geelong Football Club, was also drafted in the 2020 AFL Women's draft to the Melbourne Football Club at pick 17. Nominees for the 2021 AFL Women's draft include Ballarat Grammar students Ella Friend and Nyakoat Dojiok which will take place later in the year.

=== BAS premierships ===
Ballarat Grammar has won the following BAS premierships. Premierships won prior to 1973 were done so by the pre-amalgamation schools.

Combined:

- Athletics (18) – 1986, 1987, 1999, 2000, 2001, 2004, 2005, 2006, 2007, 2008, 2012, 2013, 2014, 2015, 2016, 2017, 2018, 2019
- Badminton (8) – 1989, 1995, 1996, 1997, 2004, 2012, 2014, 2018
- Cross Country (19) – 2000, 2001, 2002, 2003, 2004, 2005, 2006, 2007, 2008, 2009, 2010, 2012, 2013, 2014, 2015, 2016, 2017, 2018, 2019
- Lap of the Lake (19) – 2001, 2002, 2003, 2004, 2005, 2006, 2007, 2008, 2009, 2010, 2011, 2012, 2013, 2014, 2015, 2016, 2017, 2018, 2019
- Road Relay (20) – 2000, 2001, 2002, 2003, 2004, 2005, 2006, 2007, 2008, 2009, 2010, 2011, 2012, 2013, 2014, 2015, 2016, 2017, 2018, 2019

Boys:

- Athletics (16) – 1925, 1926, 1931, 1934, 1947, 1972, 1973, 1974, 2000, 2004, 2005, 2014, 2015, 2016, 2017, 2018
- Badminton (5) – 2004, 2005, 2012, 2013, 2015
- Basketball (6) – 1983, 1987, 1988, 1990, 1991, 2019
- Cricket (22) – 1912, 1913, 1916, 1931, 1933, 1942, 1969, 1970, 1971, 1972, 1974, 1979, 1981, 1983, 1984, 1985, 1986, 1991, 2002, 2003, 2006, 2020
- Cricket T20 (3) – 2016, 2017, 2018
- Cross Country (7) – 2005, 2007, 2008, 2010, 2011, 2014, 2015
- Football (2) – 1962, 1969
- Hockey (19) – 1983, 1988, 1989, 1991, 1999, 2000, 2001, 2002, 2003, 2004, 2005, 2007, 2008, 2011, 2012, 2013, 2014, 2015, 2019
- Lap of the Lake (7) – 1974, 2002, 2003, 2004, 2005, 2006, 2007
- Road Relay (15) – 2001, 2002, 2004, 2005, 2006, 2007, 2008, 2011, 2012, 2013, 2014, 2015, 2016, 2017, 2018
- Soccer (8) – 1983, 1985, 1986, 1991, 1992, 1998, 2004, 2005
- Tennis (17) – 1922, 1923, 1924, 1937, 1940, 1947, 1950, 1981, 1988, 1989, 2001, 2002, 2004, 2012, 2018, 2019, 2020
- Volleyball (11) – 1992, 2002, 2004, 2005, 2014, 2015, 2016, 2017, 2018, 2019, 2020

Girls:

- Athletics (10) – 1961, 1984, 1987, 2003, 2004, 2005, 2007, 2015, 2017, 2019
- Badminton (2) – 2006, 2014
- Basketball (4) – 1976, 2015, 2018, 2019
- Cricket (12) – 1983, 1984, 1986, 1987, 1988, 1989, 2000, 2015, 2016, 2017, 2018, 2019
- Cross Country (13) – 2001, 2002, 2003, 2006, 2007, 2008, 2010, 2013, 2014, 2015, 2016, 2017, 2019
- Football (6) – 2014, 2015, 2016, 2017, 2018, 2019
- Hockey (23) – 1973, 1974, 1977, 1978, 1979, 1981, 1988, 1990, 1992, 1993, 1994, 1995, 1997, 1999, 2002, 2003, 2004, 2005, 2006, 2007, 2008, 2009, 2017
- Lap of the Lake (9) – 2002, 2003, 2004, 2010, 2013, 2014, 2015, 2016, 2017
- Netball (11) – 1975, 1976, 1979, 1980, 1981, 1982, 1983, 2002, 2014, 2015, 2016
- Road Relay (14) – 2001, 2002, 2003, 2004, 2006, 2007, 2011, 2013, 2014, 2015, 2016, 2017, 2018, 2019
- Soccer (5) – 2005, 2007, 2009, 2015, 2016
- Softball (9) – 1962, 1972, 1983, 1984, 1989, 2001, 2005, 2006, 2012
- Volleyball (26) – 1986, 1988, 1990, 1991, 1993, 1994, 1996, 1997, 1998, 1999, 2000, 2002, 2003, 2004, 2005, 2006, 2007, 2008, 2009, 2010, 2014, 2015, 2016, 2017, 2018, 2019

== Notable alumni ==
Academia

- G. F. J. Dart – Ballarat Grammar headmaster 1942–1970
- David Fleay MBE, AM – naturalist
- Dr Alan Kenneth Head PhD (Bristol)– Mathematical Physicist at Brown University and University of Oxford
- Prof. George Seddon AM – Professor of Environmental Science, University of Melbourne

Arts and media

- Roy Dalgarno – Artist
- Brian James – actor

Music

- Warren Ellis – violinist, composer
- David Hirschfelder – musician and composer
- David Hobson – musician, composer and opera singer
- James Valentine – musician, writer, radio and television presenter

Politics

- Henry Bolte – Premier of Victoria 1955–1972
- Thomas Hollway – Premier of Victoria 1947–50, 1952
- John Pasquarelli – Member of Parliament (Papua New Guinea) and aide to Pauline Hanson

Sport

- Tamsin Barnett – Indoor and beach volleyball (2000 Sydney Olympics; 2008 Beijing Olympics; 2012 London Olympics)
- Hugh Bond – Australian rules footballer for Adelaide
- Lauren Butler – Australian rules footballer for Collingwood in the AFLW
- Rene Caris – Australian rules footballer for St Kilda in the AFLW
- Stewart Crameri – Australian rules footballer for Essendon (2010-2013), Western Bulldogs (2014-2017), and Geelong (2018)
- Robert Eddy – Australian rules footballer for St Kilda (2007-2011)
- Katie Foulkes – Rowing, Olympian, women's eight coxswain in the 2000 Summer Olympics and the 2004 Summer Olympics.
- Tony Lockett – Australian rules footballer for St Kilda (1983-1994) and Sydney (1995-1999, 2002), member of the Australian Football Hall of Fame with Legend status
- Emily Martin – Rowing, Olympian and two-time World Champion.
- Lloyd Meek – Australian rules footballer for Hawthorn
- Max Spittle – Australian rules footballer for Melbourne (1947-1950)
- Lucy Stephan – Rowing, 2016 Olympian (W8+), 2017 World Champion in the Women's Coxless Four, and 2020 Olympic Gold medalist (W4–)
- Tom Swann – Rowing Men's Eight (2012 London Olympics)
- Bronwyn Thompson – Rowing Women's Eight (1996 Atlanta and 2000 Sydney Olympics)
- Geoff Tunbridge – Australian rules footballer for Melbourne (1957-1962)
- John Vernon – High Jumper (Australian Champion, Empire Games 1954)
- Jonty Faull, Australian rules footballer for Richmond

== See also ==
- List of schools in Ballarat
