= Sacred Heart College, Ballarat =

Sacred Heart College
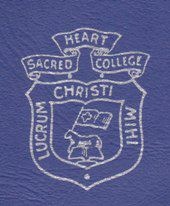

Location
- 145 Victoria Street, Ballarat East; Ballarat, Victoria; Australia
- Coordinates: 37°33′40″S 143°52′23″E

Information
- Type: Independent, day & boarding
- Motto: Latin: In altum oculos tollite (Lift thine eyes aloft)
- Denomination: Roman Catholic
- Founded: 1881; 145 years ago
- Founder: Sisters of Mercy
- Closed: 1994
- Grades: Prep to 12 (1881–1906); 7 to 12 (1906–1967); 7 to 10 (1968–1994)
- Gender: Female
- Colours: Gold, navy blue and red
- Slogan: Lucrum Christi Mihi

Sacred Heart College was a Roman Catholic all girls' school in Ballarat, Victoria. The school was founded by the Sisters of Mercy in 1881 and closed in 1994 preceding the amalgamation of the College with St Martin's in the Pines and St Paul's Technical College to form Damascus College Ballarat.

In 1906 the primary students were moved to St Francis Xavier College.

In 1960 Alice Fanning bequeathed property in Mt Clear to the Sisters of Mercy. In 1967 the land was developed for a senior school for the girls, named St Martin's in the Pines. In 1968 the Year 11 and 12 students of Sacred Heart moved to the campus at Mt Clear, which became co-educational in 1988.

Former Premier of Victoria Steve Bracks was a teacher at the school.

Today the College and convent are used for ghost tours by a Daylesford company.

== Houses ==
- Connell – named for Mother Mary Alacoque Connell (1872–1959). Born in Ireland, she entered the Convent of Mercy at Ballarat East in 1891. She was Mother-General of the congregation and principal of the school for many years.
- Healy – named for Eileen Mary Healey (1888–1966), best known as Mother Bonaventure. At the age of 20 Eileen entered the novitiate of the Sisters of Mercy, Ballarat East, where she was professed three years later as Sister Bonaventure. From 1952 to 1966 she was the principal of Sacred Heart College. She became Mother-General in 1956 and a member of the Australian College of Education in 1963. She was a foundation member of the Australian Federation of the Sisters of Mercy.
- McAuley – Venerable Catherine McAuley founded the Sisters of Mercy, who had their formal beginnings in Ireland in 1831. In response to the needs of the time, Catherine McAuley established an institution for the care and education of less advantaged girls and young women. The congregation has continued to act in response to contemporary needs in society.
- Xavier – Mother Xavier Flood was one of the founding sisters of the Convent of Mercy, Ballarat East and the first principal of Sacred Heart College.

== Principals ==
Sacred Heart

Period	Name
1881–?	Mother Xavier Flood RSM
?–?	Mother Mary Alacoque Connell RSM
1952–1966	Mother Bonaventure RSM
1974–1985	Therese Power
1987–1991	Adrian Joseph Mullaley
1992–1994	Marie Davey RSM

St Martin's

1968–?	Mother Genevieve RSM
?–?	Veronica Lawson RSM
1982–1994	Valda Ward RSM
1994	John Shannon

== Notable alumnae ==
- Maree Menzel (1966) artist and designer (dec. 2004)
- Karen Overington (1969), Member of the Victorian Parliament for Ballarat West
- Judith Myrea Brewer (1979), Officer of the Order of Australia
