= Ballarat High School =

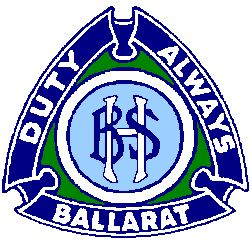

Location
- Ballarat, Victoria; Australia; 37°33′16″S 143°49′05″E

Information
- Type: Public, co-educational, secondary, day school
- Motto: Duty Always
- Established: 1907
- Principal: Stephan Fields
- Years offered: 7–12
- Gender: Co-educational
- Enrolment: 1509
- Campus: Suburban
- Colours: Navy blue, green and light blue
- VCE average: 28
- Affiliation: Ballarat Associated Schools
- Website: www.ballaraths.vic.edu.au

Ballarat High School is a government secondary school located in Ballarat, Victoria, Australia.

== Buildings and grounds ==
The school was originally opened on 16 April 1907 as a Continuation School located at 208 Sturt Street (directly opposite the Ballarat Town Hall). This initial location was due to the need to make alterations to the Dana Street Primary school building.

In March 1909, it was announced that the foundation stone of the Agricultural College would be laid that month. In April 1910, the Ballarat Continuation School moved to its present site at the corner of Sturt and Gillies streets, Lake Gardens. The new building cost around 10,000 pounds to construct (approximately $1.3 million in 2018 terms) with a further 1000 pounds for fittings and fixtures. The school then became known as the Ballarat Agricultural High School. Many buildings were constructed around the grounds for the farm, including a concrete silo which still stands today and is listed on the Heritage Council of Victoria's register.

Also in 2018 a new ARCH Learning Center was constructed on the Western End of the School Grounds as a home for the school's Year 9 students who partake in the focused Year 9 program. This program was named the ARCH program, standing for Active, Resilient, Connected and Happy – but also referencing the school's location near the Arch of Victory.

In Term 4, 2019 Art and Technology classes where relocated from the Art/Technology building to allow it to undergo a major reconstruction. The building opened in late 2020, and was named the Sedgwick Centre after previous principal L.L Sedgwick.

== Peacock Hall ==
When the main building was rebuilt and extended after the 1915 fire, the Assembly Hall was relocated to the top floor. The hall was opened by then Premier Alexander Peacock and features large stained glass windows across both ends of the hall, as well as Honour boards listing students' war service in both World Wars. Boards along the side walls also list School Captains, Council Members, the Dux of the School as well as University graduates.

The stained glass windows were designed by local artist Amalia Field, while staff member Les Ottoway persuaded Melbourne artist George Dancey to design a memorial mural tablet for the hall. The tablet was unveiled by Major Baird on 9 April 1920 and features a finely executed mosaic mural symbolising the triumph of Good over Evil. The mosaic is seen as a fitting reminder of the school's contribution to the First World War.

In 2015, as part of the school's commemoration of the 100th anniversary of the ANZAC landings at Gallipoli, Ceramics teacher Paul Gerardi was the driving force behind the design and production of Ceramic Poppies with a display being placed on the school oval for the commemoration service. After the service, 100 of the poppies were formed into the shape of a wreath and mounted on the wall of Peacock Hall. The remainder of the Poppies were sold with funds raised being donated to the Ballarat branch of Legacy Australia.

Peacock Hall is listed on the Heritage Council of Victoria's register.

== Sports ==
The school's rowing tradition dates back to its Agricultural High School roots, but the school was not admitted to the BPSA until 1944. An early Head of the Lake win came in 1947, but rowing struggled until the construction of the school's Boat Shed on the shore of nearby Lake Wendouree in 1960. This facility has been upgraded several times over the years.

Since 1996, the school has been a specialist sport school and is a member of the Ballarat Associated Schools. Students represent the school in a range of sports across all year levels including:

- athletics
- Australian rules football
- rowing
- tennis
- basketball
- netball
- field hockey
- badminton
- soccer
- cricket

=== BAS premierships ===
Ballarat High has won the following BAS premierships.

Combined:

- Athletics (5) – 2002, 2003, 2009, 2010, 2011
- Badminton (8) – 1985, 1987, 1988, 1993, 1994, 1998, 2016, 2017
- Lap of the Lake – 2000
- Lawn Bowls (7) – 2000, 2003, 2013, 2014, 2015, 2019, 2020

Boys:

- Athletics (2) – 2009, 2011
- Badminton (2) – 2014, 2018
- Basketball (11) – 1989, 1997, 1998, 1999, 2000, 2001, 2003, 2004, 2005, 2006, 2007
- Cricket (13) – 1944, 1947, 1949, 1950, 1956, 1957, 1958, 1961, 1964, 1968, 1997, 2001, 2015
- Football (2) – 1958, 2001
- Hockey (6) – 1979, 1984, 1987, 2008, 2009, 2010
- Soccer (2) – 1984, 2004
- Tennis (9) – 1970, 1972, 1973, 1974, 1975, 1976, 1977, 1978, 2005
- Volleyball (4) – 1999, 2001, 2003, 2006

Girls:

- Badminton (8) – 2005, 2007, 2008, 2009, 2010, 2013, 2018, 2019
- Basketball (10) – 1981, 1998, 2002, 2003, 2004, 2005, 2009, 2010, 2012, 2014
- Cricket (2) – 1994, 1997
- Cross Country – 2009
- Hockey (8) – 1957, 1960, 1961, 1969, 2000, 2001, 2018, 2019
- Netball (10) – 1997, 1998, 1999, 2000, 2005, 2006, 2008, 2009, 2010, 2013
- Soccer (4) – 2010, 2011, 2013, 2014
- Softball (13) – 1959, 1960, 1961, 1968, 1975, 1979, 1992, 1994, 1995, 1996, 2007, 2009, 2010
- Volleyball (6) – 1981, 1995, 2006, 2007, 2008, 2012

== Music ==
Ballarat High School has a number of student bands, including the Concert Band and two senior stage bands; The Whizbang and BoB bands. Performances are frequently shown throughout the year to a range of audiences, with the BoB band performing at a Cabaret once every year and both stage bands performing at the quarterly whole school assemblies. The Whizbang band releases an annual CD made possible by Right Click Records, a local recording company. For junior students, there are a number of bands available such as Junior Stage Band and Year 8 Band.

== Notable alumni ==
- Frederick Allsop – politician
- Collis Birmingham – representative to the 2012 Olympics in athletics
- Geoffrey Blainey – Professor of History at the University of Melbourne and Chair of Australian Studies, Harvard University
- Sir William Bridgeford – soldier, Royal Military College, Duntroon graduate and C.E.O. of the organising committee for the 1956 Melbourne Olympic Games
- Wilfred Burchett – journalist with the London Financial Times and the New York National Guardian and accused Soviet KGB spy
- Eric Burhop – physicist
- Kyra Cooney-Cross – soccer player who plays for Arsenal and the Australia women's national team (the Matildas)
- Roger Donaldson – movie director and producer
- Tom Evans MLA – businessman and Member of Parliament
- Anthony Fisher – basketball player in the NBL
- William Charles Groves – anthropologist, educationist, Director of Education in Papua New Guinea, and fellow of the Australian National Research Council
- Bridget Hustwaite – radio presenter, television presenter, journalist and author
- Paul Jenkins – politician
- Surgeon Rear Admiral Lionel Lockwood CBE MVO DSC FRACP FACMA RAN – Medical Director-General to the RAN, Honorary Surgeon to King George VI and Queen Elizabeth II and VFL footballer with the Melbourne University Football Club
- Sir Kenneth Luke – businessman and president of the Carlton Football Club and the Victorian Football League and inductee of the AFL Hall of Fame in 1996
- Amy McDonald – AFLW player.
- Kathryn Mitchell – Commonwealth Gold Medalist in the Javelin in 2018 and Dual Olympic representative
- Ronald Richards – Anglican bishop
- Brad Sewell – AFL player and 2013 premiership player
- Jared Tallent OAM – Olympic Gold Medalist and Australian representative to the 2012 Olympics in athletics
- Barry Traynor – politician
- Wes Walters – artist and Archibald Prize winner
- Paul Wiltshire – entrepreneur, record producer and songwriter.

== Notable staff ==
- John Sheehan

== See also ==
- List of schools in Ballarat
- List of schools in Victoria, Australia
- List of high schools in Victoria
