= Ballarat Secondary College =

Coordinates: 37°33′55″S 143°52′11″E

- Ballarat, Victoria; Australia

Information
- Type: Public, co-educational, secondary, day school
- Motto: Pursuing Excellence
- Established: 1993
- School number: 8828
- Principal: Ricky Gervasoni (2015–present)
- Enrolment: 1200
- Campus: 2
- VCE average: 28/50 (Woodman's Hill), 23/50 (Mount Rowan)
- Website: www.ballaratsc.vic.edu.au

Ballarat Secondary College is a multi-campus college, formed in 1993 by the amalgamation of three existing secondary colleges. The college now comprises two campuses, Woodman's Hill and Mount Rowan, each having different uniforms, crests and administrations. The school has applied to have both campuses registered as separate schools and is awaiting formal approval. In 2016, Ballarat Secondary College improved VCE scores by 20 percent. Over a five-year period, 2012 to 2016, the school was the fourth most improved in VCE performance in Victoria.

== History ==
In 1993, three secondary colleges merged to form Ballarat Secondary College. The colleges were: Ballarat East Secondary College (formerly Ballarat East High School), Wendouree Secondary College (formerly Wendouree High Technical School) and Midlands Secondary College (formerly Ballarat North Technical School). Between 2000 and 2016 students in years 11 and 12 were educated at the Barkly Street Campus, which was located on the site of Ballarat East Town Hall and the former Ballarat East Free Library, opposite the Ballarat East Fire Station. In 2013, the school under Acting-Principal Rick Ellis put forward a plan to the Department of Education to form two separate campuses, which was ultimately approved. A redevelopment plan of the two new campuses was launched in late 2015. The campuses de-merged at the start of 2019 with Mount Rowan Secondary College and Woodmans Hill Secondary College operating as separate entities.

== Campuses ==
=== Mount Rowan Campus ===
The Mount Rowan Campus, formerly called the Wendouree Campus of Ballarat Secondary College, is located on the site of the original Wendouree High Technical School (later Wendouree Secondary College), which was built in 1978 at the corner of Forest Street and Giot Drive, Wendouree. Since 2017, this campus educates students from Years 7 to 12. The Designated Neighbourhood Zone for this campus is bordered by Lydiard Street to the West and the tramline to South and East. In 2017, the school received $6m in building grants. The Mount Rowan Campus has a police cadet programme.

=== Woodman's Hill Campus ===
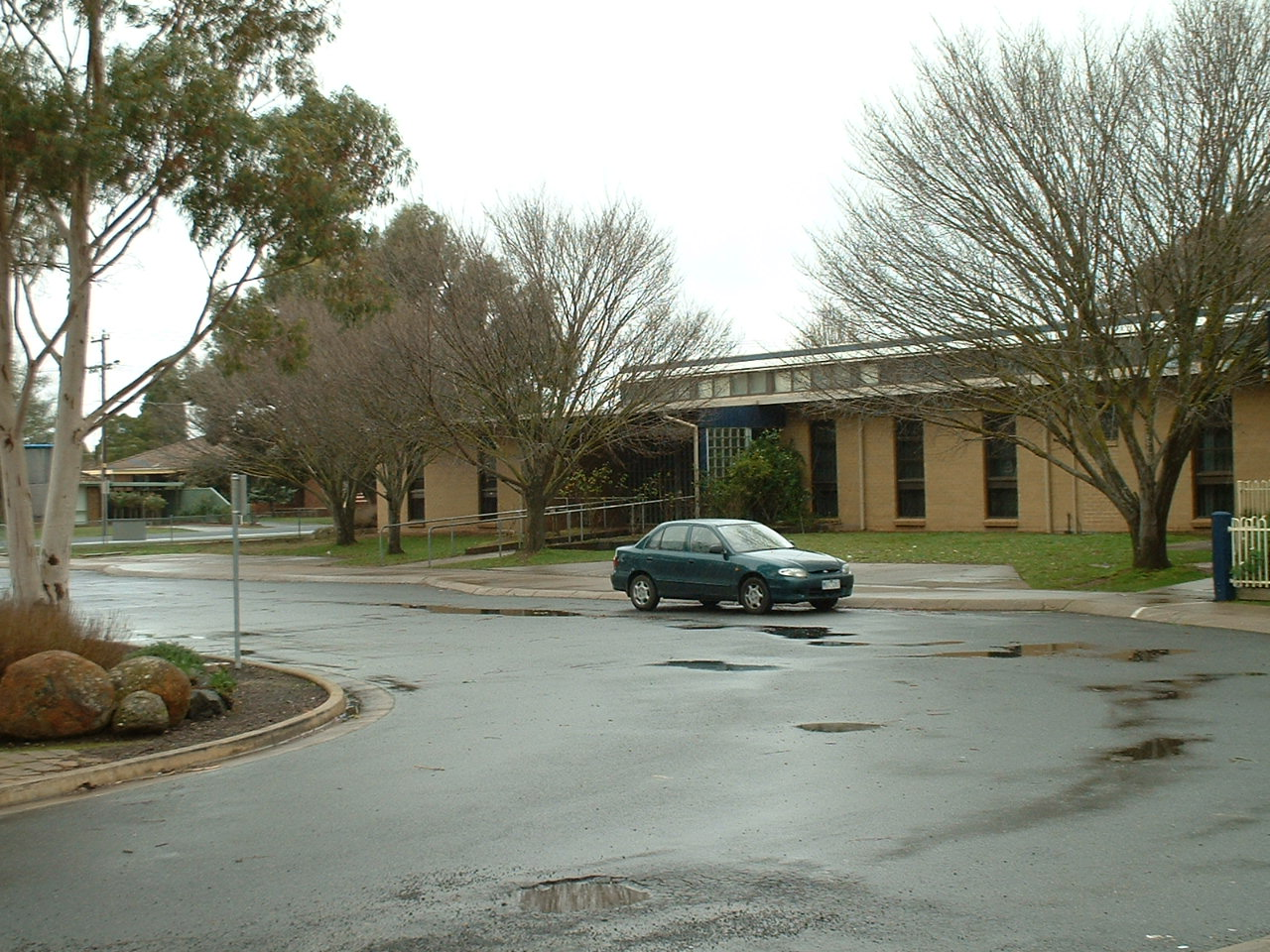
Administration wing, Wendouree Campus

The Woodman's Hill Campus of Ballarat Secondary College is located on the site of the original Ballarat East High School (later Ballarat East Secondary College) at the corner of Victoria and Fussell Streets, Ballarat East. Until 2016 it was known as East Campus. Many of the original buildings were demolished in 2008. The office and administration area opened in July 2008, and a new classroom wing opened in June 2009. Since 2017, this campus educates students from Years 7–12. The Designated Neighbourhood Zone for this campus is bordered by Lydiard Street to the East, Elsworth Street East to the South, and excludes the suburb of Mount Pleasant. From 2016 until 2018, the school received $18m in building grants. The campus has since de-merged at the start of 2019 and has become Woodmans Hill Secondary College.

=== Link Up ===
A fourth campus is called Link Up, which was based in the Ballarat Learning Exchange in Camp Street, Ballarat. This is an alternative school, based on individual learning plans, designed for students who have dropped out of normal schooling. The campus has since shifted to 602 Urqhuart St, Ballarat Central.

=== Barkly Campus (2000–2016) ===
The Barkly campus is located in Barkly Street, Ballarat. This campus has students enrolled in Year 11 and 12. Students are offered a wide range of subjects in the VCE, VET and VCAL education programs. The campus was opened in 2000 after a $6m renovation to several pre-existing buildings including the former Ballarat East Free Library and the former Ballarat Girls High School. The grounds of the campus included the original Ballarat East Botanical Gardens, the gates of which are still used. The Campus closed at the end of 2016.

== See also ==
- List of schools in Ballarat
- List of high schools in Victoria
