= Ballarat Christian College =

Coordinates: 37°35′35.4″S 143°50′37.2″E

- Ballarat, Victoria; Australia

Information
- Type: private school, co-educational, primary, secondary, day
- Motto: Every learner reaching their God-given potential
- Denomination: Ecumenical
- Established: 1999
- Principal: Ken Nuridin
- Years offered: P–12
- Gender: Co-educational
- Enrolment: 330
- Colours: Blue, burgundy and gold
- Website: www.balcc.vic.edu.au

Ballarat Christian College is a private, co-educational P–12 day school located in Ballarat, Victoria, Australia. Ballarat Christian College provides education for children in a Christian environment, in the evangelical Protestant tradition.

== History ==
In 1985, 22 students began their primary education at Carmel Christian Community School in the Bethel Hall of Carmel Welsh Presbyterian Church in Albert Street, Sebastopol under Winston Broad. In 1991 the school changed its name to Sebastopol Christian Community School. In 1999, 22 students in Years 7 and 8, began their secondary education at Ballarat Christian College in Yarrowee Street, Sebastopol under Peter NcNamara. The school was located in the former Seventh Day Adventist school buildings about a kilometre from the primary school site. In 2006, Ballarat Christian School and Ballarat Christian College amalgamated and moved to one site.
