= Maurice O'Keefe =

Australian rules footballer

Personal information
- Full name: Maurice W. O'Keefe
- Born: 22 January 1954 (age 72)
- Original team: Bungaree FC
- Height: 183 cm (6 ft 0 in)
- Weight: 85 kg (187 lb)

Playing career^{1}
Years	Club	Games (Goals)
1977–1979	St Kilda	51 (51)
1980	Geelong	1 (1)
Total		52 (52)
- ^{1} Playing statistics correct to the end of 1980.

Maurice O'Keefe (born 22 January 1954) is a former Australian rules footballer who played with St Kilda and Geelong in the Victorian Football League (VFL).

O'Keefe was from Bungaree near Ballarat and started his St Kilda career in 1977. A wingman, he had his best season in 1978 when he averaged 17 disposals from his 21 games, the third most at the club. He also kicked 29 goals that year.

After not being able to meet a new requirement that St Kilda players had to be based in Melbourne, O'Keefe got a clearance to Geelong. He played for them in the opening round of the 1980 VFL season but didn't appear again.

He won a Maskell Medal in 1984 while playing for Port Fairy in the Hampden Football League.
