= St Patrick's College, Ballarat =

St Patrick's College

Location
- Ballarat, Victoria; Australia; 37°33′37″S 143°49′53″E

Information
- Former name: Holy Ghost College (1888–c. 1892)
- Type: Independent secondary day and boarding school
- Motto: Latin: Facere et Docere (To Do and To Teach)
- Religious affiliation: Catholicism
- Denomination: Congregation of Christian Brothers
- Established: 1893; 133 years ago
- Founder: Christian Brothers
- Trust: Edmund Rice Education Australia
- Chairman: Peter Wilson
- Headmaster: Steven O'Connor
- Years offered: 7–12
- Gender: Boys
- Enrolment: 1,430
- Colours: Green, white and blue
- Slogan: Raising Fine Boys To The Status of Great Men
- Nickname: St Pat's; Paddy's; SPC
- VCE average: 30
- Affiliation: Ballarat Associated Schools
- Website: www.stpats.vic.edu.au

St Patrick's College, sometimes referred to as St Pat's, Paddy's or SPC, is an independent Catholic secondary day and boarding school for boys, located in central Ballarat, Victoria, Australia. The school was founded by the Congregation of Christian Brothers in 1893, who continue to run the school through Edmund Rice Education Australia. The school provides education for boys from Year 7 to Year 12, with an emphasis on academic and sporting programs.

The college promotes the teachings of Jesus Christ and the Catholic Church, basing itself on the four pillars of faith, excellence, tradition and joy. The patron of the college, Paul Bird, Bishop of Ballarat, presides over the major college Masses along with other priests (including former students of St Patrick's).

== History ==
The college was originally called Holy Ghost College, which was started in 1888 and administered by the Holy Ghost Fathers. Also in 1888, St Alipius' Primary School was established by the Christian Brothers. However, after a promising start, the senior school closed due to the Holy Ghost Fathers' departure for France. The Bishop of Ballarat at the time, James Moore, contacted the Provincial of the Christian Brothers in Australia, Brother Patrick Ambrose Treacy, to take over the running of the school. The new college opened its doors on 24 January 1893, as St Patrick's College. Four Christian Brothers were on the initial staff, with the Brother J. L. Ryan as the founding headmaster.

In 1924 St Patrick's Christian Brother's boys' primary school was built in Drummond Street South. This school and St Alipius were operated by the Christian Brothers at St Patrick's College but both became systemic parish schools in the 1980s. St Patrick's College now no longer has a junior school attached to it and students commence at Year 7 having completed their primary education elsewhere.

The school gradually grew in stature and size to become not only the largest Catholic school in Ballarat, but one of the leading Catholic schools in Victoria. The college, under the governance of the Christian Brothers, grew from its first enrolment of 36 students in 1893 to 168 in 1902. The school's academic record was first class even in its infancy, with the 1893 dux of the college, Sir Hugh Devine, becoming a world-famous surgeon. The school has grown immensely in the past 100 years, with over 1,000 boys enrolled.

The college, in 1933, completed the construction of the Brother's residence, a large imposing red-brick building, still dominating the facade of the school. A memorial chapel was constructed in 1954 and dedicated to the memory of St Patrick's Old Collegians who died during the First and Second World Wars. This large Romanesque chapel still holds pride of place at the front of the school and is the centre of the school's spirituality. The college has over 300 graduates who have been ordained priests, a record in Australia. Over 60 graduates have entered into religious life.

In 1966, the W.T. O'Malley Wing was completed in dedication to Brother William Theodore O'Malley, who was not only deputy headmaster of the college for 30 years, but taught there for over 40 years. He is remembered as one of the greatest brothers to grace St Patrick's College, with many Old Collegians dedicating their successes to his tuition. In 1976 the J.L. Kelty Resource Centre was opened. It is dedicated to Brother Justin Linus Kelty, a former headmaster, who led the college in the 1960s.

In 1979, the college completed the W.T. O'Malley Sports Centre, which was officially opened by former students and Brownlow Medal winners John James and Brian Gleeson.

In 2004, the college officially opened the W.J. Wilding Wing, which now houses the senior school. The building was named in honour of Brother William Wilding, a former headmaster of the college in the early 1980s who oversaw the completion of the Dr Spring Administration Wing.

Peter Casey succeeded L. B. Collins in 2002 in 2002, becoming the school's first lay headmaster. John S. Crowley became St. Patrick's second lay headmaster in 2015.

== Curriculum ==
St Patrick's College offers its senior students the Victorian Certificate of Education (VCE).

VCE results 2012-2025
Year	Rank	Median study score	Scores of 40+ (%)	Cohort size
2012	178	30	16.9	264
2013	232	29	6.4	332
2014	192	30	5.9	306
2015	183	30	6	371
2016	237	29	4.9	376
2017	271	29	3.2	357
2018	186	30	5.4	344
2019	225	29	5.7	278
2020	300	28	4.7	292
2021	292	28	5.5	258
2022	270	29	3.6	281
2023	299	28	3.8	265
2024	289	28	5.3	276
2025	337	28	2.6	254

== Student abuse scandals ==
Between 1953 and 1983 a number of students who attended St Patrick's College made allegations that they were sexually assaulted. Some of these cases were litigated and the offenders found guilty. A Christian Brother who lived at St Patrick's College in the early 1970s was subsequently convicted of child sexual offences related to activities at a branch school.

In May 2015 the Royal Commission into Institutional Responses to Child Sexual Abuse, a royal commission of inquiry initiated in 2013 by the Australian government and supported by all of its state governments, began an investigation into the response of Australian institutions, including the Catholic Church, to the impact of child sexual abuse on survivors, their families and their communities.

The royal commission's final report about Catholic Church authorities in Ballarat was released on 6 December. The commission found that:

"Many children, mainly boys, said they were sexually abused at St Alipius and/or St Patrick's College." Most allegations at St Patrick's College related to Ted Dowlan who taught there from 1973 to 1975.

== Headmasters ==
The following individuals have served as headmasters of St Patrick's College:

Ordinal	Officeholder	Term start	Term end	Time in office
1	Bro. J. L. Ryan c.f.c.	1893	1894	0–1 years
2	Bro. J. B. Nugent c.f.c.	1894	1899	4–5 years
3	Bro. W. M. McCarthy c.f.c.	1899	1904	4–5 years
4	Bro. J. G. Hughes c.f.c.	1904	1905	0 years
5	Bro. J. B. Duggan c.f.c.	1905	1906	0–1 years
6	Bro. J. T. Quinn c.f.c.	1906	1908	1–2 years
7	Bro. F. S. Carroll c.f.c.	1908	1909	0–1 years
−	Bro. W. M. McCarthy c.f.c.	1909	1909	0 years
8	Bro. Paul Nunan c.f.c.	1910	1912	1–2 years
9	Bro. E. F. Keniry c.f.c.	1912	1915	2–3 years
10	Bro. J. S. Turpin c.f.c.	1916	1919	2–3 years
−	Bro. E. F. Keniry c.f.c.	1920	1924	3–4 years
11	Bro. T. B. Galvin c.f.c.	1925	1926	0–1 years
12	Bro. J. C. McCann c.f.c.	1926	1930	3–4 years
13	Bro. W. M. Reidy c.f.c.	1930	1930	0 years
14	Bro. J. K. O'Neill c.f.c.	1931	1933	1–2 years
15	Bro. D. G. Purton c.f.c.	1934	1939	4–5 years
16	Bro. I. L Mackey c.f.c.	1940	1942	1–2 years
17	Bro. J. D. Healy c.f.c.	1943	1948	4–5 years
18	Bro. C. A. Mogg c.f.c.	1949	1949	0 years
−	Bro. J. D. Healy c.f.c.	1950	1954	3–4 years
19	Bro. J. H. Lynch c.f.c.	1955	1960	4–5 years
20	Bro. V. I. Murphy c.f.c.	1961	1963	1–2 years
21	Bro. J. L. Kelty c.f.c.	1964	1966	1–2 years
22	Bro. P. B. Murphy c.f.c.	1966	1966	0 years
23	Bro. Michael B. Stallard c.f.c.	1967	1969	1–2 years
24	Bro. Ronald S. Stewart c.f.c.	1970	1972	1–2 years
25	Bro. Paul J. Nangle c.f.c.	1973	1978	4–5 years
26	Bro. J. P. O'Halloran c.f.c.	1978	1978	0 years
27	Bro. William J. Wilding c.f.c.	1979	1984	4–5 years
28	Bro. T. F. Kearney c.f.c.	1985	1988	2–3 years
29	Bro. K. J. Buckley c.f.c.	1989	1991	1–2 years
30	Bro. L. B. Collins c.f.c.	1992	2001	8–9 years
31	Peter M. Casey	2002	2014	11–12 years
32	John S. Crowley	2015	2020	4–5 years
33	Steven O'Connor	2021	incumbent	4–5 years

== Sport ==
St Patrick's is a member of the Ballarat Associated Schools (BAS). The College was a founding member of the Associated Catholic Colleges in 1911 until 1975 and re-joined in 2022.

=== Basketball Team Achievements ===
==== Championship Men (Open) ====
- Australian Schools Championships

(bronze) Third Place: 2010

== Notable alumni ==
Arts, media, and entertainment

- Paul Bongiorno – chief political reporter with Network 10
- Wal Cherry – theatre director, Foundation Professor of Drama at Flinders University and Professor of Theatre at Temple University (Philadelphia, PA)
- Raimond Gaita – author and Professor of Moral Philosophy at King's College London
- Bernard Heinze – professor of music and director of the New South Wales State Conservatorium of Music and 1974 Australian of the Year
- George Helon – Australian author and businessman who received the Freedom of the City of London in 2016
- David Parer – natural history film maker

Business

- Paul McGinness DFC, DCM – World War I fighter pilot, noted aviator, and founder of Qantas

Law, public service, and politics

- Steve Bracks – former Premier of Victoria
- Donald Morrison Grant AO – former Surveyor-General of New South Wales
- Jim McClelland – solicitor, judge, senator, minister in the third Whitlam ministry and royal commissioner
- Gavan O'Connor – former Federal Shadow Minister
- Albert Ogilvie KC – former Premier of Tasmania
- Harrie Seward – former senator and West Australian minister

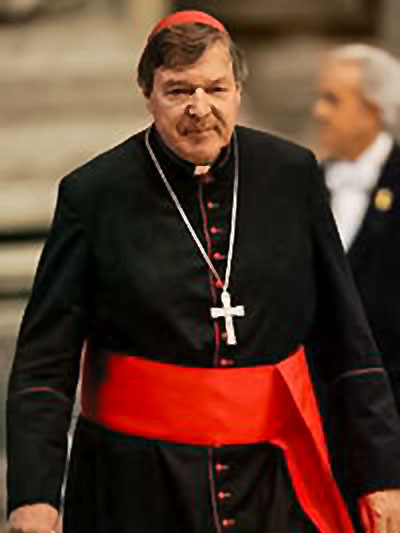
Cardinal Pell

Religion

- Frank Little – former Archbishop of Melbourne
- George Pell AC – cardinal of the Roman Catholic Church (1983–2023), Prefect of the Secretariat for the Economy of the Holy See (2014–2019)

Sport

- Tony Benson – Australian athlete 1972 Munich Olympics
- Brett Bewley – Australian rules football player for Fremantle Dockers
- Brian Brown – Australian rules football player for Essendon Bombers
- Mitch Brown – Australian rules football player for West Coast Eagles
- Nathan Brown – Australian rules football player for Collingwood Magpies
- Brad Crouch – Australian rules football player for Adelaide Crows
- Matt Crouch – Australian rules football player for Adelaide Crows
- Tom Downie – Australian rules football player for GWS Giants
- Liam Duggan – Australian rules football player for West Coast Eagles
- Anthony Edwards – Australian rower, five-time Olympian
- Danny Frawley – Australian rules football player for St Kilda Saints
- Brian Gleeson – Australian rules football player for St Kilda Saints, Brownlow medallist
- Martin Gleeson – Australian rules football player for Essendon Bombers
- Shaun Grigg – Australian rules football player for Carlton Blues
- Jack Hill – Australian and Victorian cricket player
- Jacob Hopper – Australian rules football player for GWS Giants
- John James – Australian rules football player for Carlton Blues, Brownlow medallist
- Alex McDonald – Australian rules football player for Hawthorn Hawks and Collingwood Magpies
- Anthony McDonald – Australian rules football player for Melbourne Demons
- James McDonald – Australian rules football player for Melbourne Demons
- Oscar McDonald – Australian rules football player for Melbourne Demons
- Tom McDonald – Australian rules football player for Melbourne Demons
- Michael McGuane – Australian rules football player for Carlton Blues and Collingwood Magpies
- James Marburg – Australian rower, silver medalist at 2008 Beijing Olympics, fifth at 2012 London Olympics
- Steve Moneghetti – four-time Olympic marathon runner
- Jake Neade – Australian rules football player for Port Adelaide
- Leo O'Brien – Australian test cricket player
- Nick O'Brien – Australian rules football player for Essendon Bombers
- Jesse Palmer – Australian rules football player for Port Adelaide
- Drew Petrie – Australian rules football player for North Melbourne Kangaroos
- Michael Pickering – Australian rules football player for North Melbourne Kangaroos
- Paul Reedy – Australian rower, silver medalist at 1984 Los Angeles Olympics
- Barry Richardson – Australian rules football player for Richmond Tigers
- Matthew Rosa – Australian rules football player for West Coast Eagles
- Christian Ryan – Australian rower, silver medalist at 2000 Sydney Olympics
- Harry Sharp – Australian rules football player for Melbourne Demons
- Nathan Sobey – basketballer
- Nick Suban – Australian rules football player for Fremantle Dockers
- Bryan Thomas – Olympic sprint kayaker 1988
- Brian Vear – Australian rower, 1960 Rome Olympics and 1964 Tokyo Olympics
- Peter Walsh – Australian rules football player for Port Adelaide
- Tom Williamson – Australian rules football player for Carlton Blues
- Dallas Willsmore – Australian rules football player for Hawthorn Hawks
- Clinton Young – Australian rules football player for Hawthorn Hawks
- Will Young – Australian rules football player for Adelaide Crows
- Josh Gibcus – Australian rules football player for Richmond Tigers
- Daniel Rioli – Australian rules football player for Gold Coast Suns
- Kai Lohmann - Australian rules football player for Brisbane Lions
- Aaron Cadman – AFL Footballer for GWS
- Sam Butler – AFL Footballer
- Dan Butler – AFL Footballer
- Mario Bortolotto – Carlton Footballer
- Ray Ball – Richmond and South Melbourne footballer

== See also ==
- Catholic education in Australia
- List of schools in Ballarat
- List of schools in Victoria, Australia
- List of boarding schools
