= Edward Kelly (Australian bishop) =

Australian Catholic bishop (1917–1994

The Most Reverend Edward Kelly
- Bishop Emeritus of Diocese of Toowoomba
- Diocese: Toowoomba
- Installed: 11 February 1976
- Term ended: 20 November 1992
- Predecessor: William Joseph Brennan
- Successor: William Martin Morris
- Other posts: Titular Bishop of Ficus (1969–1975), Auxiliary Bishop of Sydney (1969–1975)

Orders
- Ordination: 12 March 1942 at St Mary's Cathedral, Sydney by Norman Thomas Gilroy
- Consecration: 25 March 1969 at St Mary's Cathedral, Sydney by Norman Thomas Gilroy

Personal details
- Born: Edward Francis Kelly; 22 March 1917 Wellington, New South Wales, Australia
- Died: 2 September 1994 (aged 77) Currumbin, Queensland, Australia
- Denomination: Catholic Church
- Occupation: Catholic bishop

Edward Francis Kelly (22 March 1917 – 2 September 1944) was an Australian bishop of the Catholic Church. He was Bishop of Tooowoomba for 17 years and prior to that, had served as Auxiliary Bishop of Sydney for seven years.

== Early life ==
Kelly was born in Wellington, New South Wales, the youngest son and second youngest of 10 children born to Denis and Elizabeth Kelly. His father died when he was just 12 years old. His brother, Lou Kelly, was a professional golfer who won the Australian Open in 1933 and the Australian Professional Championship in 1934. Kelly was also an accomplished golfer.

Kelly was educated at Marist College Kogarah by the Marist Brothers before pursuing priestly studies with the Missionaries of the Sacred Heart at St Mary's Towers, Douglas Park, Sacred Heart Monastery, Croydon and then in Rome.

== Priesthood ==
On 12 March 1942, Kelly was ordained to the priesthood at St Mary's Cathedral, Sydney by Archbishop Norman Thomas Gilroy. He was ordained alongside Francis Flynn, a former leading ophthalmic surgeon.

In the late 1940s, he began to work with the Apostolic Delegation in Sydney. In 1954, he was appointed Superior of the Sacred Heart Monastery, Kensington. The same year, Pope Pius XII conferred the Pro Ecclesia et Pontifice on Kelly for his services to the Apostolic Delegation in Sydney for five years prior to his appointment as Superior of the Sacred Heart Monastery, Kensington.

== Episcopate ==
On 6 February 1969, Kelly was appointed Auxiliary Bishop of Sydney by Pope Paul VI. He was consecrated on 25 March 1969 at St Mary's Cathedral, Sydney by Cardinal Norman Thomas Gilroy.

In 1974, he was a vocal critic of the Federal Government's Family Law Bill, which legalised no-fault divorce across Australia.

On 19 December 1975, he was appointed Bishop of Toowoomba following the death of Bishop William Joseph Brennan. He was installed as the fourth Bishop of Toowoomba at St Patrick's Cathedral, Toowoomba by Archbishop Francis Roberts Rush.

Under Kelly's episcopate, the Toowoomba presbyterate were quite engaged on social justice issues.

He also began construction on the James Byrne Centre, a retreat centre named after Toowoomba's first bishop.

Following the 1984 Quattuor abhinc annos letter, allowing the celebration of the Tridentine Mass with episcopal approval, Kelly celebrated a public Tridentine Mass with Bishop Thomas Muldoon at St Michael's College Chapel in the University of Sydney in 1985. It was the first 'lawful' Tridentine Mass held in 20 years.

Kelly had appeared to hold some concerns about Brisbane's Banyo Seminary, allowing a student for the Diocese of Toowoomba to complete their studies at another seminary in the early 1990s.

Kelly retired as Bishop of Toowoomba on 20 November 1992, having hit the canonical retirement age of 75. His successor, Bishop William Martin Morris, would be removed from the Diocese in 2011 by Pope Benedict XVI.

== Death ==
Kelly died on 2 September 1994 at Currumbin Hospital following a short illness. His funeral was held on 7 September 1994 at St Patrick's Cathedral, Toowoomba. He was buried in the Toowoomba Garden of Remembrance.

Catholic Church titles
Preceded by William Joseph Brennan	Bishop of Toowoomba; 1975–1992	Succeeded by William Martin Morris
Preceded by –	Titular Bishop of Ficus; 1969–1975	Succeeded by Jaime Pedro Gonçalves
Preceded by –	Auxiliary Bishop of Sydney; 1969–1975	Succeeded by –
