= Bishop's House, Toowoomba =

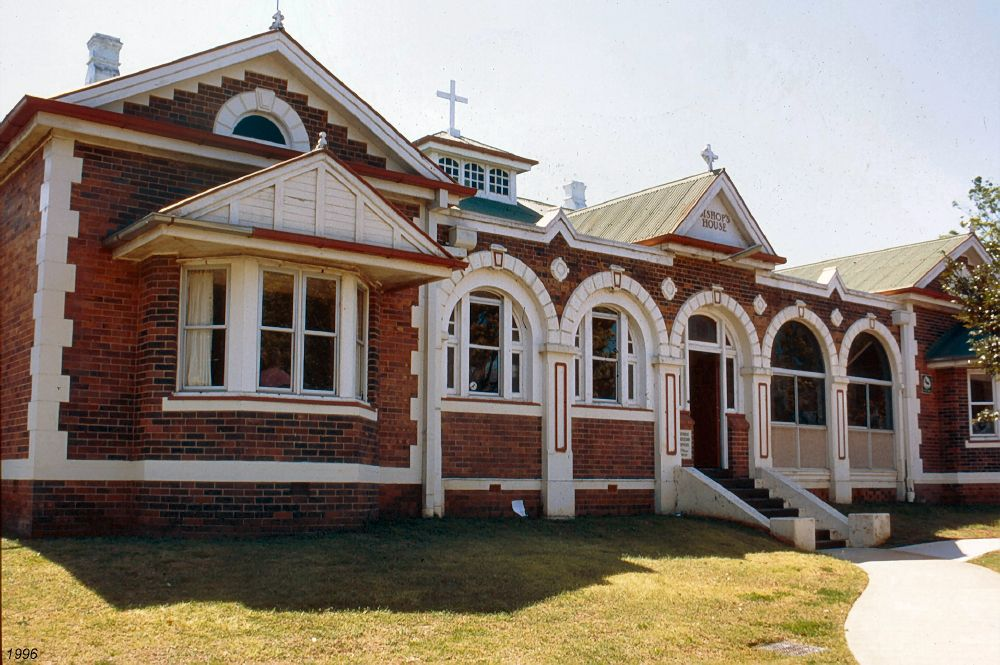
- Bishop's House, 1996

- Location within Queensland Location within Australia
- 27.5618°S 151.9646°E
- Location: 73 Margaret Street, East Toowoomba, Toowoomba, Toowoomba Region, Queensland, Australia

History
- Design period: 1900–1914 (early 20th century)
- Built: 1910–c. 1911 – 1939–c. 1940

Site notes
- Architect: Henry Marks

Queensland Heritage Register
- Official name: Bishop's House, Dalmally, Kilallah
- Type: state heritage (landscape, built)
- Designated: 21 October 1992
- Reference no.: 600845
- Significant period: 1910s, 1939–c. 1940 (fabric); 1910s, 1939 – late 20th century (historical)
- Significant components: loggia/s, service wing, lead light/s, chimney/chimney stack, trees/plantings, garden/grounds, residential accommodation – main house, clerestory, fence/wall – perimeter

Bishop's House is a heritage-listed villa at 73 Margaret Street, East Toowoomba, Toowoomba, Toowoomba Region, Queensland, Australia. It was designed by Henry Marks and built from 1910 to c. 1911 and from 1939 to c. 1940. It is also known as Dalmally and Kilallah. It was added to the Queensland Heritage Register on 21 October 1992.

== History ==
Bishop's House, designed by Henry Marks, was constructed in 1911 as the home of Toowoomba businessman, William Charles Peak. In 1939 the house was purchased by the Roman Catholic Church and became home to the Bishop of the recently created Toowoomba Diocese.

Settlement of what was to become the Toowoomba area commenced at Drayton, now a suburb of Toowoomba, in the early 1840s. Thomas Alford opened a general store in the area in 1843. In the same year, residents of Drayton petitioned the Governor to form a township. A survey of the town was prepared in 1849. In laying out Drayton, Government Surveyor James Charles Burnett was instructed to mark out "suburban allotments for Garden and Agricultural purposes". The ideal site for what was known as the "Drayton Swamp Agricultural Reserve", later to become Toowoomba, was an area approximately three to four miles northeast of Drayton where two swampy creeks joined to form the headwaters of Gowrie Creek. The Agricultural Reserve included 12 allotments bounded by the left bank of the west swamp, and the present Bridge, West and Stephen streets.

Six of the 12 "Swamp allotments" were first offered at auction in November 1849, however some were not sold until 1853. By late 1857, the name "Toowoomba" had gradually taken over from "The Swamp", as the town continued to expand. At the time of its incorporation into a municipality in November 1860, Toowoomba had well outgrown Drayton. Toowoomba continued to develop as the service centre for the upper Darling Downs. It became the urban home of many pastoralists and businessman during the early twentieth century.

One of the many people who constructed houses during this period of expansion was William Charles Peak, born in Drayton in 1867 as the eldest son of a local councillor WJ Peak. In 1881 William Peak entered the company of Wilcox Bros, general merchants of Toowoomba and within fifteen years was the owner. He took an interest in the development of Toowoomba and held many positions in local industry and development including President of the local Chamber of Commerce (1914–15); Chairman of the Toowoomba Permanent Society; as well as being the instigator of the Greenmount Dairy Factory Co Ltd, who established one of the first cheese factories in the state. He was involved with the foundation of the Anderson Malting Company, the Darling Downs Building Society; the Toowoomba Steam Laundry and the Security Trust Company. Peak's other local involvements included the Royal Agricultural Society; the local Cricket Union and the Traders' Association. Today, two memorials to Peak are found in Toowoomba, one at the Toowoomba showground and another in Queen's Park where a drinking fountain is named in his honour.

In about 1910 as a reflection of his importance in the local community, WC Peak commissioned local architect Henry J Marks to design a house, initially known as Kilallah, for the Peak family at the corner of Lindsay and Margaret Streets, Toowoomba, adjacent to Queen's Park.

Henry Marks was a member of a prominent Toowoomba architectural family. James Marks, Henry's father, arrived in Queensland from England in 1866 and practised as an architect and builder in Dalby before starting his successful family practice in Toowoomba in the 1870s which remained active until 1962. Henry joined his father in practice in 1892 when the business became known as James Marks and Son.

Henry Marks was an innovative and creative architect, who invented and patented several products including pot-bellied ventilation flues and chimney shafts, windows and a walling system. He employed his inventions on many of his buildings and this helps to identify the buildings for which he was responsible. Several of these innovations are found at Kilallah, now known as the Bishop's House, including window openings and chimney stacks. Marks designed windows which allowed maximum opening capacity and also directed airflow around the opening. The windows designed for the end bays of the Bishop's House were extendable casements. Also on the house were several of Marks' patented design for "Improved Chimney Top and Ventilator" introducing a rounded base to the shaft of the chimney top directing air flow and with a V-shaped catchment plate and run-off for rainwater.

The planning of the Bishop's House reflects Marks' concern with air flow and natural lighting; a large ventilated roof light over the intersection of the entrance hall and the transverse corridor terminated at the east and west ends of the building with semi-open octagonal bays.

In her thesis on the Marks family architectural practice in Toowoomba, Morag Papi, describes the building as "one of the best examples of Harry Mark's work". Certainly the sophistication of the detailing, the composition of the exterior and regard to environmental issues suggest that this is a well considered building. His other numerous Toowoomba buildings include the halls at both St Luke's and St James' Churches (St James hall is known as the James Taylor Memorial Institute) St Mary's Christian Brothers building; Holy Name Convent; buildings at the General Hospital; White Horse Hotel; Union Bank and City Chambers.

The Peak family remained at Kilallah for only a few years when the house was purchased by a Mr Horrigan who sold it to the Fletcher family. The house was then rented out to a number of people until its purchase by the Roman Catholic Church of Toowoomba as a Bishop's residence in 1939.

The Catholic Church was established in Toowoomba in the early 1860s when a pastor was appointed. Robert Dunne, later Archbishop of Brisbane, was appointed as a parish priest in Toowoomba in 1868. The Roman Catholic Church in Queensland developed with the population increases and by 1928 Archbishop James Duhig announced that two new dioceses, Toowoomba and Townsville were to be created, raising the number of diocese to four, alongside Brisbane and Rockhampton.

The first Bishop appointed to Toowoomba was James Byrne, born in Ireland in 1840 and educated at St Patrick's College, Thurles, County Tipperary. Byrne was ordained by the Archbishop of Cashel on 21 July 1896 and volunteered to work in the Archdiocese of Brisbane. After work in Brisbane for many years he was appointed Domestic Prelate in 1923 and then was appointed as the Bishop of Toowoomba in 1929. St Patrick's Church in Toowoomba, constructed in 1883–89 to a design by James Marks, was consecrated as a cathedral on 1 September 1929.

The residence originally used by James Byrne was the brick presbytery alongside St Patrick's Cathedral, constructed in 1927 for a parish priest before the archdiocese was formed, to a design by Jack Donoghue. This was deemed too small to house both the bishop, parish priests and administrators of the growing parish and therefore a dedicated residence for the bishop was found in "Unara" in 1939. Previously, Unara was the residence of Sir Littleton Groom, Member of the Australian House of Representatives for the Darling Downs and was leased from Lady Groom by the Diocese for one year with the option of purchase at the end of this time. However, because the location of Unara, near the eastern boundary of the Diocese, was considered inconvenient the purchase option was not exercised.

Instead the Diocese bought WC Peak's 1911 residence, then known as "Dalmally", along with a timber house on property adjoining the main house on Lindsay Street. The house was called Dalmally by a lessee, Captain Serisier, in remembrance of a village in Scotland.

To facilitate the use of the house as a Bishop's residence extensive internal alterations and some external renovations were carried out to a design by local architects, Messrs Hodgen and Hodgen, a partnership of William Hodgen Jnr and his son. Hodgen was born in Toowoomba where he did an apprenticeship in the building trade before joining the Queensland Colonial Architect's Office as a cadet in 1886. He then travelled to London to broaden his professional experience and returned to Queensland in 1896 and began private practice in Toowoomba in February 1897 where he remained until his death in 1943.

The alterations designed by Hodgen for the Bishop's House, as it became known after its purchase by the Roman Catholic Church, were principally internal. Pressed metal ceilings by Wunderlich used in most of the rooms were retained along with the general floor plan of the building. Changes introduced included forming an entrance vestibule on the front loggia/verandah; alterations of the semi-octagonal end bays with the removal and bricking up of several sash windows; a room was planned as a chapel; a bathroom was added to the eastern end of the house in an extension designed for that purpose and some internal rearrangement of existing walls and doors was carried out to facilitate access to this extension. External signage, "BISHOP'S HOUSE" was added to the pediment above the entrance doors and sections of the front verandah/loggia were enclosed with glazing. Internally almost every room of the house was wall-papered to the picture rail.

Alterations to the grounds around the house included the demolition of the stables and replacement with a skillion roofed garage and construction of new entrance gates off Lindsay Street for motor-car access. A timber and concrete laundry was erected to the northwest of the house.

The various Bishops of Toowoomba remained at Bishop's House until recently, when another residence was constructed to the rear, northeast side of the building. Bishop's House has been refurnished as offices for the diocesan administration and the Catholic Education Office.

== Description ==
Bishop's House, located opposite Queen's Park on the corner of Lindsay Street fronting Margaret Street to the south, is a single-storeyed masonry building with rendered quoining and detailing. The building has a corrugated iron roof with projecting gables, a central clerestory surmounted by a cross, and three HJ Marks patented pot bellied chimney stacks.

The symmetrical south elevation has a central enclosed loggia consisting of five arches with rendered voussoirs, keystones and columns, supporting a parapet wall surmounted by two small triangular projections either side of a central gable with the name BISHOP'S HOUSE in raised lettering. The loggia is flanked by projecting bays at either end, and is enclosed with arched sash window units and masonry panels on the western side, and sliding aluminium window units on the eastern side of the entry. The central entry has steps leading to a timber door with leadlight panel insert, sidelights and fanlight depicting a crest. The projecting bays have sash windows, but evidence of the original HJ Marks patented extendable casement windows is visible. The bays are surmounted by projecting boarded gables, above which are semi-circular windows with rendered voussoirs in the gable to the roof.

The north elevation has an enclosed verandah with an accommodation wing attached at the northwest corner, which consists of a masonry section with a timber framed and fibrous cement clad addition with concrete stumps. The verandah is enclosed with vertically jointed boarding to sill height and multi-paned sliding timber windows with fixed green glass panels above. The east and west ends have a projecting five-sided bay room with masonry to sill height and extendable casement windows above. These windows have been replaced by aluminium sliding windows on the west bay. A small brick addition with a parapet wall and sash window has been constructed on the southern side of the east bay room.

Internally, the building has plastered walls with wide east–west and north–south halls which intersect below a central clerestory. Principal rooms open to the south enclosed loggia, with French doors and an arched sash window with rendered voussoirs. However, the original loggia wall to the west of the entry has been removed to create one large office into the loggia space. Secondary rooms open to the north enclosed verandah which is lined with fibrous cement and has a sash window painted to imitate stained glass opening from the former chapel. A large arched doorway containing a timber door with leadlight sidelights and fanlight opens to the rear of the central hall. The foyer has timber wall panelling, and throughout the building many of the doors, architraves and skirtings have an obscure grained finish. Ceilings are pressed metal of various designs, most of the doors and windows have patterned glass panels, and fireplace surrounds are of narrow face brick. At either end of the east–west hall are panelled timber doors with leadlight panel insert, sidelights and fanlight. The east bay room has coloured glass door and windows, and a partition wall has been constructed to create a hall leading to the south addition.

The northwest accommodation wing contains an office and kitchen in the masonry section, with a bedroom and bathroom in the fibrous cement section. The masonry section has rendered walls with boarded ceilings, and the addition has timber framed fibrous cement walls and ceiling.

The site has a low brick fence along the south and west boundaries, with driveway access at the southeast and to the northwest of the building. A metal front gate is located at the corner of Lindsay and Margaret Streets, with a path leading to the main entrance. The grounds contain substantial mature trees to the south and southwest, with a bitumen carpark to the southeast and carports to the northwest.

The site also contains the Marian Community Centre, a single-storeyed masonry building to the northwest, and a two-storeyed masonry residence for the Bishop to the northeast of the building.

== Heritage listing ==
Bishop's House was listed on the Queensland Heritage Register on 21 October 1992 having satisfied the following criteria.

The place is important in demonstrating the evolution or pattern of Queensland's history.

Constructed in 1911, Bishop's House is a substantial brick house which demonstrates the growth of this area of Toowoomba during the 1910s, a period of commercial and social expansion for the town following closer settlement. The building's use by the Roman Catholic Church illustrates the development of the church in Queensland, in particular internal growth which saw the establishment of another two dioceses in 1929.

The place is important in demonstrating the principal characteristics of a particular class of cultural places.

The building is a very good example of the work of architect Henry Marks, combining much of his innovative detailing with a general concern for ventilation and natural lighting.

The place is important because of its aesthetic significance.

Bishop's House, together with its mature plantings, makes a significant aesthetic contribution to the Margaret Street streetscape and Toowoomba townscape. The form and fabric of the building illustrate a creative and skilled design approach, and the detailing of the materials and finishes reflects a fine quality of workmanship.

The place is important in demonstrating a high degree of creative or technical achievement at a particular period.

The use of the extendable casement window and pot-bellied chimney stacks, as patented designs, are important in demonstrating a high degree of technical achievement by the architect Henry Marks during the early twentieth century.

The place has a strong or special association with a particular community or cultural group for social, cultural or spiritual reasons.

The building is important to members of the Roman Catholic community in Toowoomba as the home of the Bishop of their Diocese for many years.

The place has a special association with the life or work of a particular person, group or organisation of importance in Queensland's history.

The building is associated with Henry Marks, a prominent and prolific local architect; with WC Peak an important early Toowoomba businessman for whom it was constructed, and with the hierarchy of the Roman Catholic Church in Toowoomba who have owned the building as their principal residence since 1939.
