= Bill Morris (bishop) =

Australian Catholic prelate

His Excellency, The Most Reverend Bill Morris
- Bishop of Toowoomba
- Diocese: Diocese of Toowoomba
- Installed: 20 November 1992
- Term ended: 2 May 2011
- Predecessor: Edward Francis Kelly, MSC
- Successor: Robert McGuckin

Orders
- Ordination: 28 June 1969 (Priest) at St Stephen's Cathedral, Brisbane
- Consecration: 10 February 1993 (Bishop) at St Patrick's Cathedral, Toowoomba

Personal details
- Born: William Martin Morris; 8 October 1943 (age 83) Brisbane, Queensland, Australia
- Denomination: Roman Catholic Church
- Parents: William Alexander and Sylvia Morris
- Occupation: Roman Catholic bishop
- Profession: Cleric
- Education: St Joseph's College, Gregory Terrace in Brisbane; Pius XII Provincial Seminary, Banyo in Brisbane

William Martin Morris (born 8 October 1943) is an Australian Catholic prelate who served as Bishop of Toowoomba from 1992 to 2011. In May 2011, the Holy See removed Morris from office, attracting international press coverage.

== Pastoral career ==
Morris was born in Brisbane, where he was educated at St Joseph's College, Gregory Terrace, before studying for the priesthood at Pius XII Provincial Seminary in Banyo. He was ordained a priest of the Archdiocese of Brisbane in 1969. His parish appointments included Sunnybank, Nambour, Mt Gravatt, Goodna and Surfers Paradise. During 1979 to 1984 he served as secretary to Archbishop Francis Rush in Brisbane and also as Diocesan director of vocations.

In 1992, Morris was appointed by Pope John Paul II to head the Toowoomba Diocese. His consecration took place at St Patrick's Cathedral on 10 February 1993. He became known for his pastoral leadership and his work with diocesan cases of sexual abuse. In 2009, he dismissed the principal of a Toowoomba Catholic primary school and two Catholic education officials for failing to report to the police an early complaint from a schoolgirl.

During his tenure, Morris became the target of reports of liturgical unorthodoxy and also attracted controversy for his support of the Third Rite of Confession. In 2006, Morris released a pastoral letter that discussed the declining number of priests in remote dioceses like Toowoomba. The letter called for discussion of the ordination of married men and the ordination of women. This was interpreted by some as a challenge to the teaching of Pope John Paul II's apostolic letter Ordinatio Sacerdotalis, which said that "the Church has no authority whatsoever to confer priestly ordination on women." The letter from Morris also suggested that the Catholic Church might consider recognising "Anglican, Lutheran, and Uniting Church orders".

In December 2006, Morris received a fax requesting that he come to Rome by February 2007 for meetings with three cardinals: Giovanni Battista Re, then head of the Vatican's Congregation for Bishops; William Levada, then head of the Congregation for the Doctrine of the Faith and Francis Arinze. Morris did not attend, citing "pastoral reasons", and offered to present himself in May.

An apostolic visitation of the Toowoomba Diocese was conducted by Charles J. Chaput, the Archbishop of Denver in April 2007. Chaput reported to the Congregation for Bishops in May 2007. Morris claimed to have never seen this report. He was given an unsigned document from the Congregation for Bishops indicating 13 separate issues. Morris then negotiated with several Vatican congregations for several years. Attempts by Vatican administrators to reconcile Morris with the church's position included several meetings in Rome where, it has been reported, he was asked to resign several times.

In December 2008, Morris wrote to Pope Benedict XVI requesting an audience. He was received by the Pope on 4 June 2009. Later, Morris claimed that he was told, "It is God’s will that you resign". In February 2011 the Apostolic Nuncio to Australia, Giuseppe Lazzarotto, wrote to Morris requesting his resignation.

== Removal as diocesan bishop ==
On 1 May 2011, Morris stated in a letter to parishioners of the Diocese of Toowoomba that "it has been determined by Pope Benedict XVI that the diocese would be better served by the leadership of a new bishop", but that he felt that he was being denied "natural justice". Morris announced his early retirement at age 67, stressing the fact that he had not resigned. On 2 May, the Apostolic Nuncio to Australia announced that the pope had "removed [Morris] from pastoral care" of his diocese. Morris became Bishop Emeritus of Toowoomba. Several hundred people attended two separate vigils for Morris on 3 May in Toowoomba.

On 13 May 2011, the Australian Catholic Bishops' Conference (ACBC) issued a statement, stating that they supported Pope Benedict's decision to remove Morris. In the statement they noted:

"It was judged that there were problems of doctrine and discipline, and we regret that these could not be resolved. We are hopeful that Bishop Morris will continue to serve the Church in other ways in the years ahead".

At a meeting of the Permanent Committee of the ACBC on 2 August 2011, a petition was presented from many Catholics of the Diocese of Toowoomba in support of Morris. In a statement on 11 August the Permanent Committee said:

"The reality of our ecclesial structure is that the Conference is not able to resolve the issues that have arisen. Not only do the local Bishops not have access to all the information on which Pope Benedict came to his decision, but what has happened in Toowoomba is a matter between the Holy Father and Bishop Morris."

During an ad limina visit in Rome that month, ACBC bishops held discussions regarding the situation in Toowoomba with both Cardinal Marc Ouellet and Cardinal William Levada and among themselves. Archbishop Mark Coleridge said that the talks "went very positively" and "surpassed" their expectations. In a letter from the ACBC, released on 21 October:

"What was at stake was the Church’s unity in faith and the ecclesial communion between the Pope and the other Bishops in the College of Bishops ... we express our acceptance of the Holy Father’s exercise of his Petrine ministry ... (and) we return to Australia determined to do whatever we can to heal any wounds of division."

Morris responded to the letter on 24 October 2011, writing:

"The statement of the Australian Catholic Bishops contains inaccuracies and errors of fact evidenced by the documentation relating to the issues concerning myself and a number of Vatican dicasteries. The Statement made by the Australian Bishops invites me to tell my story which I will publish in the foreseeable future."

In October 2011, it was reported that several lay Catholics in Toowoomba had expressed concern that Morris still had a high profile in the diocese, giving a public lecture, in-service talks to teachers and officiating at parish anniversaries. Cardinal George Pell said to Catholic News Agency, "if he is a loyal man of the Church he'll realize that this is totally inappropriate and that won't continue. That is my hope."

Morris gave an address for Women and the Australian Church (WATAC) on 26 March 2013. He spoke about the vital role of lay people in interpreting the Second Vatican Council and "reclaiming its spirit".

In June 2014, Morris's book Benedict, Me and the Cardinals Three was published, describing his experience of the dismissal.

Catholic Church titles
Preceded by Edward Francis Kelly, MSC	5th Catholic Bishop of Toowoomba; 1992 – 2012	Succeeded by Robert McGuckin (as of 11 July 2012)
