= Emmanuel College, Warrnambool =

Coordinates: 38°22′14.1″S 142°28′37.9″E

Emmanuel College

Location
- 140 Botanic Rd; Warrnambool, Victoria; Australia

Information
- Type: Roman Catholic, day
- Motto: Sharing Faith, Hope and Love
- Denomination: Catholic
- Established: 1872 as (St Ann's) Convent of Mercy, 1991 as Emmanuel College
- Headmaster: Rachel McGennisken
- Years offered: 7–12
- Gender: Co-educational
- Enrolment: 1171
- Houses: Rice, McAuley, Egan, Maguire
- Colours: Dark red, white and blue
- Website: www.emmanuel.vic.edu.au

Emmanuel College is a Catholic, co-educational, secondary college in Warrnambool, Victoria, Australia. The college is situated on three campuses in Warrnambool, located at the end of the Great Ocean Road in Victoria's Western District. The college is co-sponsored by the Sisters of Mercy who established St Ann's College in 1872 and the Congregation of Christian Brothers who founded St Joseph's Christian Brothers' College in 1902. Emmanuel College was the result of an amalgamation of the two colleges in 1991.

== Geography ==
Emmanuel College is located in Warrnambool, approximately 256.7 kilometres west of Melbourne on the Southern Ocean. The Ardlie Street (McAuley) Campus is home to Year 7, 8 and 10 students and is on approximately 20 acres (81,000 m^{2}) of land that incorporates Emmanuel's Agricultural Skills Centre and the Gothic Revival St Ann's Chapel (1888).

== History ==
=== St Ann's College ===
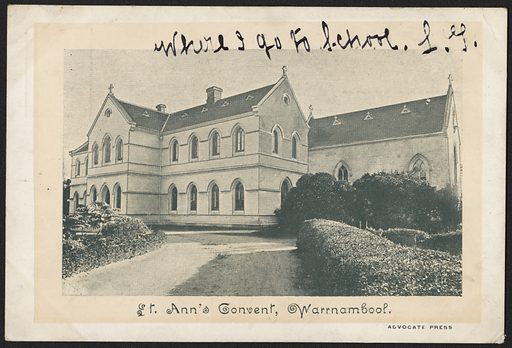
St Ann's Convent (far right - St Ann's Chapel)

The Sisters of Mercy had purchased the property "Wyton House" and established their convent and "A Day and Boarding School for Young Ladies" by July 1872 on the present site of the Ardlie Street Campus. The dedication of their chapel in 1888 resulted in the school's name becoming St Ann's College. The college was offering to prepare students for matriculation by the late 19th century. The college's junior school (kindergarten to grade 6) had been phased out by 1975 and its boarding school had closed by 1978. From this point until its amalgamation in 1991, St Ann's was a day school, providing its girls with a years 7–12 curriculum.

St Ann's Day is celebrated annually in July in the grounds of Emmanuel College where St Ann's Old Collegians celebrate Mass in the St Ann's Chapel followed by lunch. The chapel is adjacent to the small St Ann's Garden where a marble statue of Saint Ann was donated by old collegians in 1958. Sir Fletcher Jones donated the original garden.

=== St Joseph's Christian Brothers' College ===
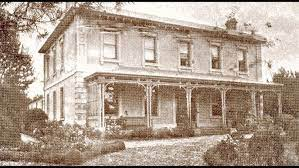
Christian Brothers' Residence, Canterbury Road, Warrnambool c.1912

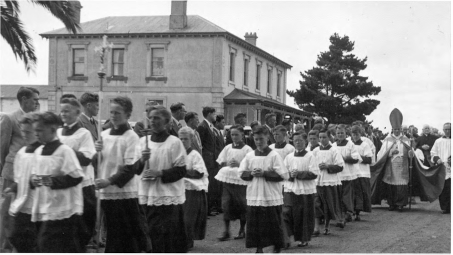
Christian Brothers' College (CBC), c. 1940s – students partaking in religious procession with Brothers' Residence in background

The Christian Brothers opened a private day school for boys in 1902 on the corner of Jamieson Street and Banyon Street, Russells Creek, Warrnambool. 16 boys enrolled, "ranging from grade 3" – the level at which its junior school commenced – and up "to matriculation" (year 12). The school was known as both 'St Mary's High School' and 'The Monastery' in its early years. In 1911, the purchase of the Canterbury Road grounds, previously the Hohenlohe Ladies' College, saw the establishment of St Joseph's Christian Brothers' College. The new grounds were officially opened on January 12, 1912, in the presence of Archbishop Carr and the Premier, John Murray. For many decades the school maintained its primary school, enrolling boys at grade 3. By 1987 "the long tradition of combined primary and secondary education" had drawn to a close and the college provided its boys with a years 7–12 curriculum.

St Ann's College and CBC amalgamated in 1991 to become the co-educational Emmanuel College.

The Wesley-CBC cricket team remained active as of 2019.

== House system ==
Each house is named after a significant person in the college's history. Sporting competitions are held between them each year.

House	Colour	Origin of name
Maguire	Yellow	Mother Philomene Maguire
Egan	Blue	Brother Egan
McAuley	Green	Sister Catherine McAuley
Rice	Red	Br Edmund Rice

== Curriculum ==
Emmanuel has a wide range of curriculum choices. Its special features are the Five Star Program for Year 7, the FLY program for Years 8 to 10 and a full range of options for senior students, including VCE, VET, VCAL and Australian School Based Apprenticeships. The F.L.Y. (Flexible Learning Years) program provides for students to be able to work at levels appropriate to their ability, rather than the traditional approach of being locked into units bound by their year level or age. Emmanuel College students can also gain nationally accredited qualifications in Agriculture whilst still at school.

== Co-curricular activities ==
These include music activities (now removed) and performances, public speaking and debating, mooting, Duke of Edinburgh's Award, Science Talent Search and other academic competitions, Eisteddfods, drama productions, a variety of team sports, rowing, equestrian team, agricultural shows, Emmanuel's Interactive Animal Nursery at the Fun4Kids Festival and Field Days, chess, Book Club, optional camps and trips including study tours to France, Japan, New Caledonia, Switzerland and the Rock To Reef tours.

== Sports ==
Emmanuel College has created to the development of a number of students who have represented their state and country at world championships and the Commonwealth, Olympic and Paralympic Games. The college provides a wide range of sporting options and opportunities to compete in interschool carnivals.

== Notable alumni ==
Sport

- Jonathan Brown, former Australian rules football player, captain of the Brisbane Lions, Coleman Medalist and 3 time premiership player
- Brody Couch, Victoria and Melbourne Stars cricket player
- Willem Drew, Australian rules football player
- Michelle Ferris, Australian Olympic cyclist
- Adrian Gleeson, former Australian rules football player and Carlton Football Club board member
- Martin Gleeson, Australian rules football
- Trevor Gleeson, NBL coach and assistant Australian Basketball coach
- Louis Herbert, former Australian rules football player
- Simon Hogan, former Australian rules football player
- Kevin Neale, former Australian rules football player
- Shaun Ryan, Australian rules football umpire and barrister
- Nathan Sobey, national Basketball League player with the Adelaide 36ers and Greek Basketball League PAOK, Commonwealth Games gold medalist
- George Threlfall, former Australian rules football player
- Michael Turner, Australian rules football player

Politics and political service

- David Atkinson, OAM and former mayor of Warrnambool
- Roma Britnell, member of the Victorian Legislative Assembly for South-West Coast
- Beth Gleeson, member of the Victorian Legislative Assembly for Thomastown
- Danielle Green, member of the Victorian Legislative Assembly for Yan Yean and member of the Andrews Ministry
- Lady Lynch (née Leah O'Toole), charity worker
- John McGrath, member of the Victorian Legislative Assembly for Warrnambool (1985–1999)
- Joseph Basil Roper, bishop of Toowoomba

Media and the arts

- Gorgi Coghlan, television presenter
- Lisa Gorman, fashion designer
- Shane Howard, singer-songwriter
- Dave Hughes, television presenter and comedian
- Peggy O'Keefe, pianist, bandleader and television and radio presenter

== Sister schools ==
- Obirin High School, Tokyo, Japan
- Edmund Rice School, Tanzania
- Etablissement Secondaire de Morges-Beausobre, Switzerland
- Previously Mackillop College, Swan Hill, Victoria, Australia
