= William Joseph Brennan (bishop) =

Australian Roman Catholic bishop

The Most Reverend William Joseph Brennan
- Bishop of Toowoomba
- Province: Brisbane
- Diocese: Roman Catholic Diocese of Toowoomba
- Installed: 8 November 1953
- Term ended: 11 September 1975
- Predecessor: Joseph Basil Roper
- Successor: Edward Francis Kelly

Orders
- Ordination: 17 December 1927
- Consecration: 21 October 1953

Personal details
- Born: 4 November 1904 Dulwich Hill, New South Wales, Australia
- Died: 11 September 1975 (aged 70) Toowoomba, Queensland, Australia
- Buried: Drayton and Toowoomba Cemetery
- Denomination: Roman Catholic Church
- Profession: Cleric

William Joseph Brennan (1904–1975) was a Roman Catholic priest in Australia. He was the Bishop of Toowoomba.

== Early life ==
Brennan was born on 4 November 1904 at Dulwich Hill near Lewisham, Sydney, New South Wales. He was educated by the Sisters of St Joseph at Dulwich Hill and the Christian Brothers at Lewisham.

== Religious life ==
In 1921, Brennan commenced training for the priesthood at St Columba’s Seminary at Springwood (now St Columba's High School) in 1921 and continued through St Patrick’s Seminary, Manly, and finally Propaganda College, Rome, obtaining a Doctorate in Theology.

He was ordained on 17 December 1927, after which he served in a number of parishes in New South Wales. In 1952 he was appointed Vicar-General of the Diocese of Wilcannia-Forbes.

On 24 August 1953, it was announced that Brennan would be the next Bishop of Toowoomba, following the retirement of Bishop Roper in late 1952. On 21 October 1954, he was consecrated at the Holy Family Church at Parkes, New South Wales, in a ceremony led by Cardinal Gilroy. The consecration was attended by a number of his family, including his sister, the Reverend Mother Joan Brennan of the Wilcannia-Forbes Sisters of Mercy, who was so seriously ill that she was brought into the church in a wheelchair and was the first to receive her brother's blessing after his consecration. On 8 November 1953, he was enthroned at St Patrick's Cathedral in Toowoomba by Archbishop of Brisbane, James Duhig.

As Bishop, he established 6 more parishes and established 19 more churches in the diocese.

== Later life ==
Brennan died in office, following a long illness on 11 September 1975 at St Vincent's Hospital at Toowoomba aged 70. A crowd of 3,000 people including 25 bishops attended his funeral. He was buried on 15 September 1975 at the Drayton and Toowoomba Cemetery.
