= Louis Herbert =

Australian rules footballer

Personal information
- Born: 27 June 1994 (age 32)
- Original teams: North Ballarat Rebels, (TAC Cup), Hampden Hurricanes
- Draft: No. 4, 2014 National Draft, Gold Coast
- Height: 188 cm (6 ft 2 in)
- Weight: 77 kg (170 lb)
- Position: Forward

Playing career^{1}
Years	Club	Games (Goals)
2014	Gold Coast	3 (0)
- ^{1} Playing statistics correct to the end of 2017.

Louis Herbert (born 27 June 1994) is a former Australian rules footballer who played for the Gold Coast Football Club in the Australian Football League (AFL).

Herbert was recruited by Gold Coast from the North Ballarat Rebels with the 4th pick in the 2014 rookie draft. He made his debut in round 18, 2014 against the Brisbane Lions. He was delisted by Gold Coast at the conclusion of the 2015 AFL season.

== Statistics ==
Legend
G	Goals	K	Kicks	D	Disposals	T	Tackles
B	Behinds	H	Handballs	M	Marks

Season	Team	No.	Games	Totals							Averages (per game)						
Season	Team	No.	Games	G	B	K	H	D	M	T	G	B	K	H	D	M	T
2014	Gold Coast	39	3	0	0	7	4	11	1	7	0.0	0.0	2.3	1.3	3.7	0.3	2.3
Career			3	0	0	7	4	11	1	7	0.0	0.0	2.3	1.3	3.7	0.3	2.3

== Personal life ==
Louis Herbert attended Emmanuel College Warrnambool.
