= The Pyramid at Anderston =

Community centre in Glasgow, Scotland

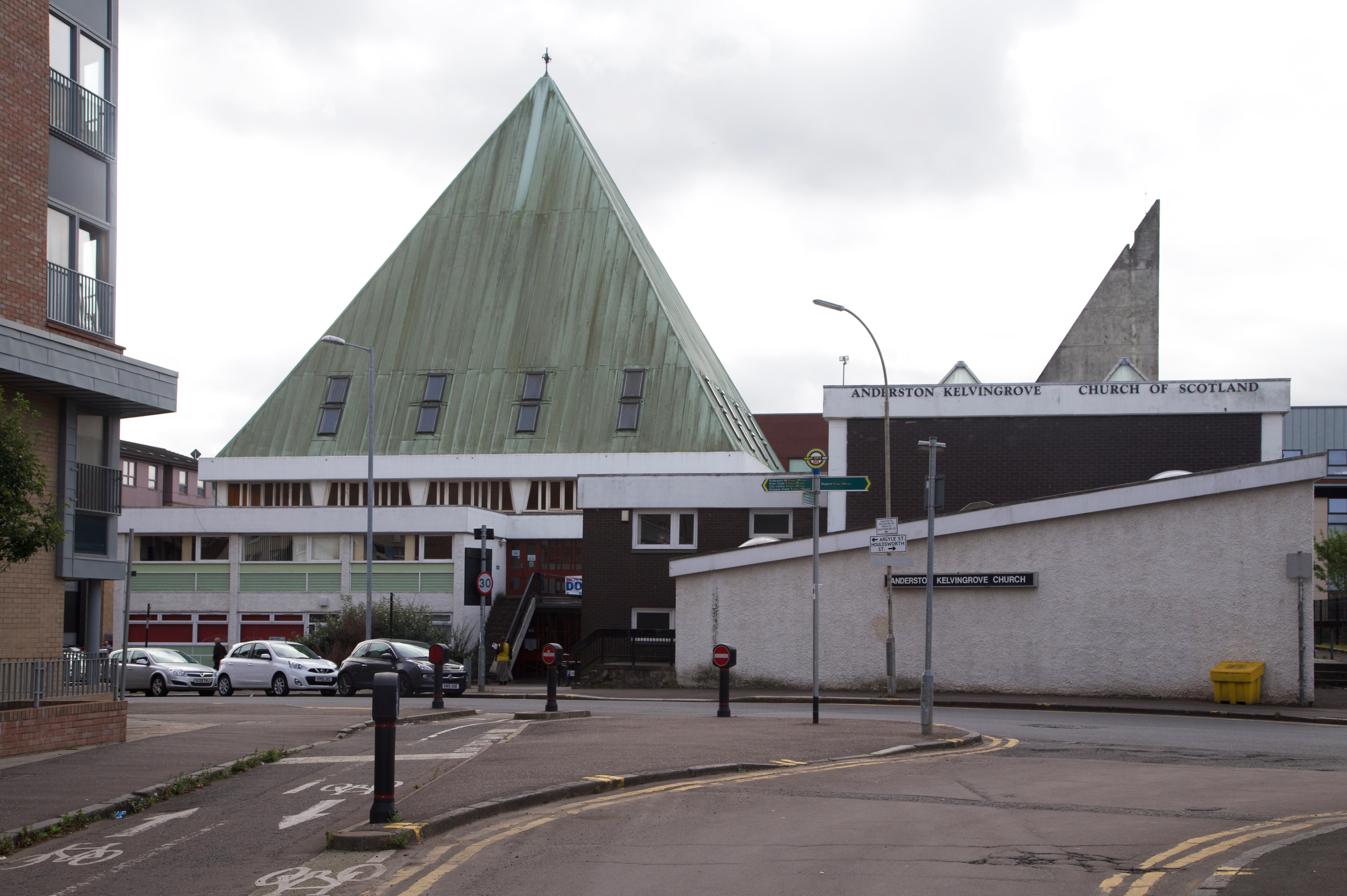
- The building in 2016
- Interactive map of the The Pyramid at Anderston area
- Former names: Anderston Kelvingrove Parish Church

General information
- Status: Community Centre
- Architectural style: Modern; Brutalist
- Location: 759, Argyle St, Glasgow, Scotland
- Coordinates: 55°51′42″N 4°16′30″W
- Groundbreaking: 1966
- Completed: 1968
- Closed: 2019 (as a church)

Website
- thepyramid.scot/

Listed Building – Category B
- Designated: 7 February 2014
- Reference no.: LB52172

The Pyramid at Anderston is a community-owned centre for the people of Anderston in Glasgow, which uses the building of the former Anderston Kelvingrove Parish Church.

== History of the Building ==
Following a promotion within the Church of Scotland to construct less hierarchical church buildings in the 1950s, an open-plan Modern design with Brutalist traits, by the architectural firm Honeyman, Jack & Robertson, was adapted for the new Anderson Parish Church. The building consists of a 2-storey square-plan church with prominent pyramidal roof, with over 20 rooms. The foundation stone was laid in 1966, with a service of commemoration in the now demolished St Mark's-Lancefield Church. The building was completed in 1968.

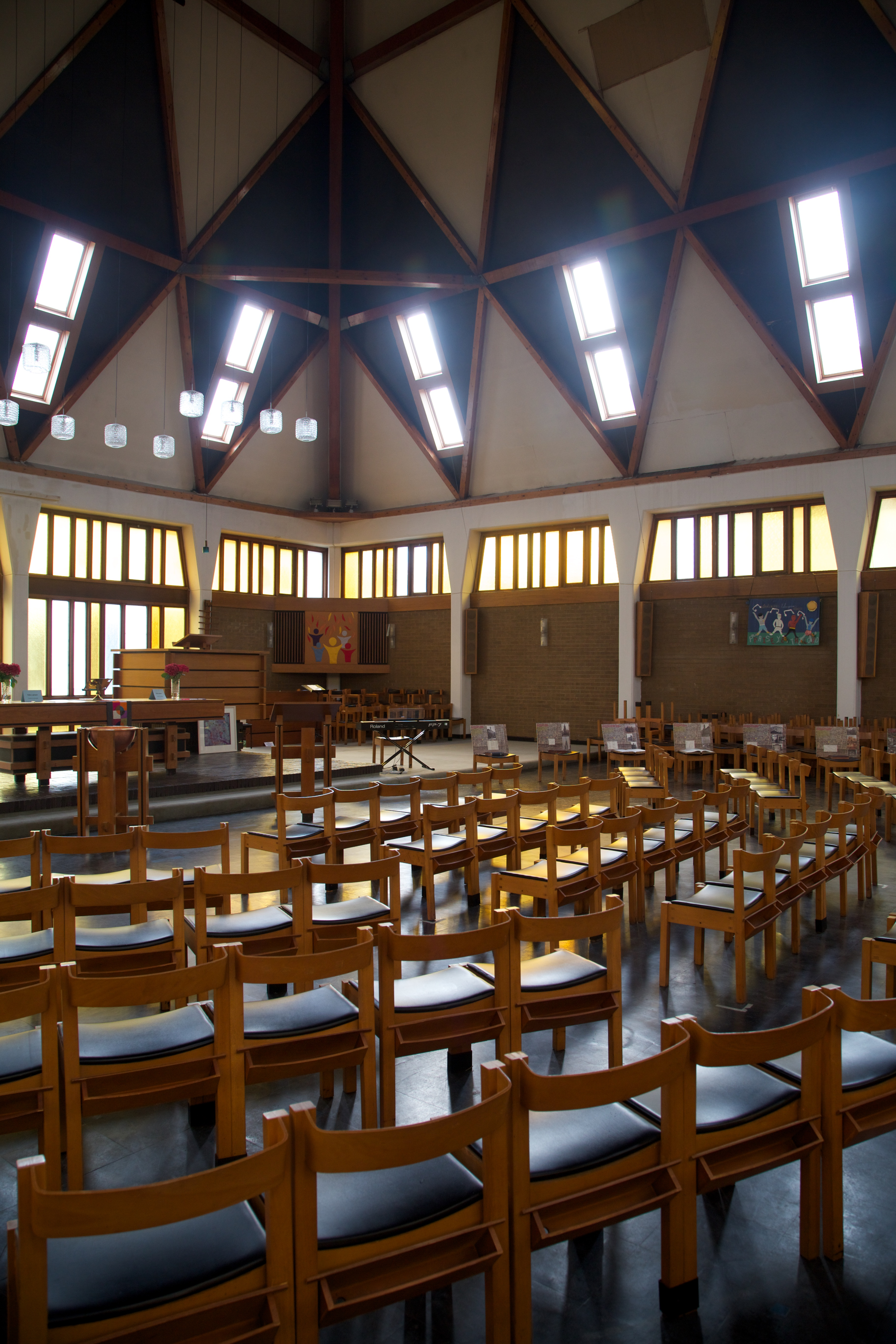
Interior of the sanctuary

== History of the Congregation ==
The Anderston congregation was created through the unification of various congregations in the area, notably Anderston Old Church (demolished), Anderston and St Peter's (Union of St Martin's Church & St Peter's Church - both demolished), and St Mark's-Lancefield Church (demolished). The congregation of Kent Road & St Vincent's Parish Church (converted into flats) united with the Anderston congregation in 1977, while the congregation of Kelvingrove Parish Church (converted into flats) united with Anderston in 1978, forming the Anderston Kelvingrove congregation. Upon closure of Anderston Kelvingrove Parish Church in 2019, the congregation united with Renfield St Stephen's to form St Andrew's West.

== Present-day ==
In 2019 the Church of Scotland sold the building and it became a community centre for people to "connect, create and celebrate". It also serves as an inspirational space for music, performances, conferences and events.
