= Joseph Basil Roper =

Australian Roman Catholic priest

The Most Reverend Joseph Basil Roper
- Bishop of Toowoomba
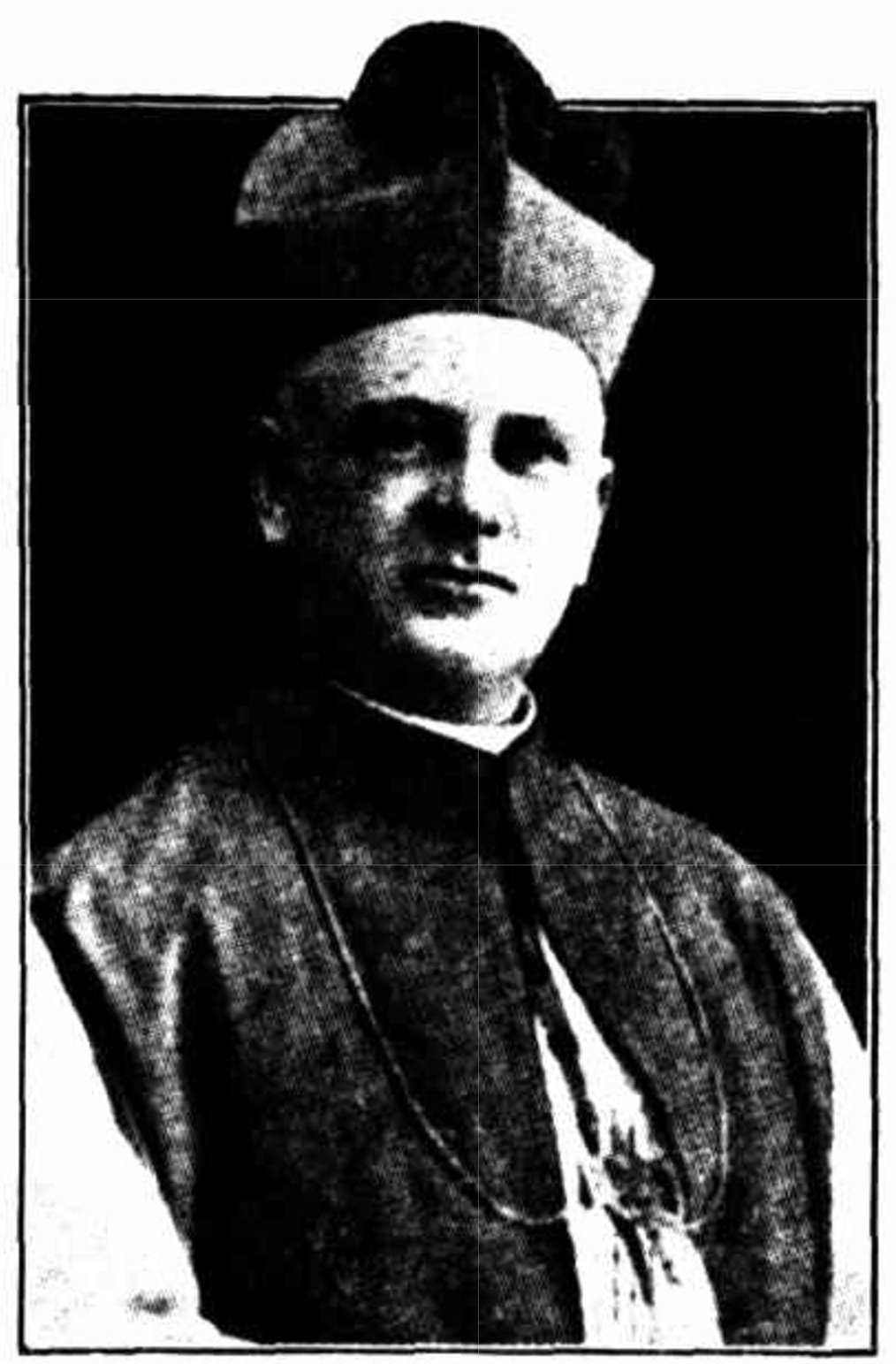
- Bishop Roper, 1938
- Province: Brisbane
- Diocese: Roman Catholic Diocese of Toowoomba
- Other post: Titular Bishop of Elusa

Orders
- Ordination: 30 November 1911
- Consecration: 28 October 1938

Personal details
- Born: 9 March 1888 Warrnambool, Victoria, Australia
- Died: 28 July 1964 (aged 76)
- Denomination: Roman Catholic Church
- Profession: Cleric

Joseph Basil Roper was a Roman Catholic priest in Australia. He was the Roman Catholic Bishop of Toowoomba in Queensland.

== Early life ==
Roper was born on 9 March 1888 at Dennington near Warrnambool, Victoria, Australia. There he attended St Ann's College, run by the Sisters of Mercy and then transferred to the Christian Brothers' College in 1902 which had been established for boys in that year.

== Religious life ==
In 1906, Roper commenced his training for the priesthood at St Patrick's Seminary in Manly, Sydney, New South Wales, where he was one of their most brilliant students. On 30 November 1911 Roper was ordained a Roman Catholic priest at St Mary's Cathedral in Sydney and commenced his service in the Diocese of Ballarat, Victoria.

On 13 July 1938 he was appointed as Bishop of Toowoomba in Queensland, being consecrated on 18 October 1938 at St Patrick's Cathedral in Ballarat in a service led by the Archbishop of Melbourne, Daniel Mannix. He was then enthroned at St Patrick's Cathedral in Toowoomba on 20 November 1938 in a service led by Archbishop of Brisbane, James Duhig.

As bishop, he was characterised for his efforts to get to know people. He increased the number of parishes in the diocese from 19 to 32.

== Later life ==
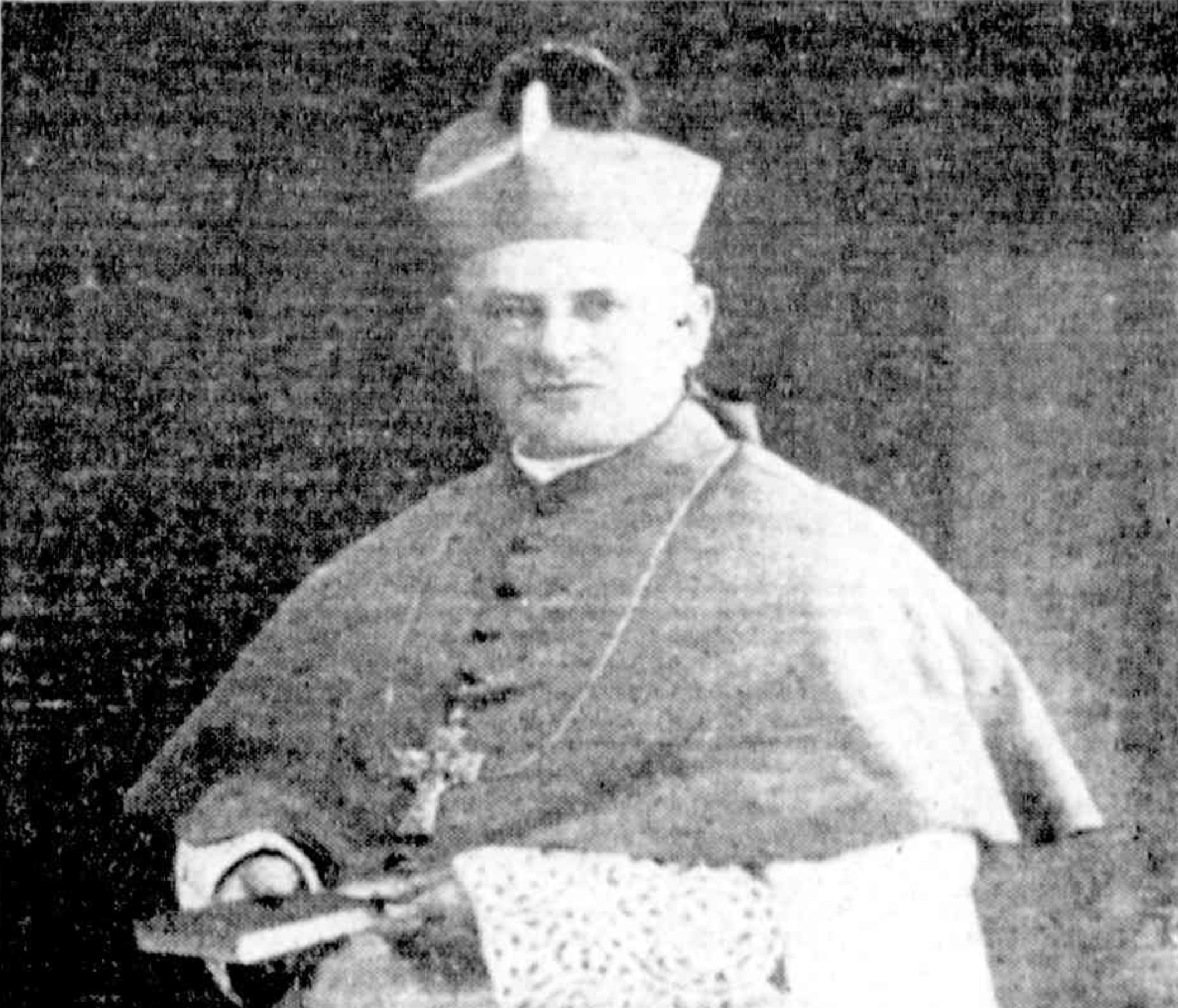
Joseph Basil Roper, 1953

In October 1952, Roper announced his retirement due to his failing health not being able to cope with the demands of his role, but continued in an administrative capacity until he was replaced. He was then appointed as Titular Bishop of Elusa. He retired to Ararat in Victoria, where he died on 28 July 1964.
