= St Andrew's West, Glasgow =

Coordinates: 55.865206°N 4.266865°W

St Andrew's West
- St Andrew's West Parish Church
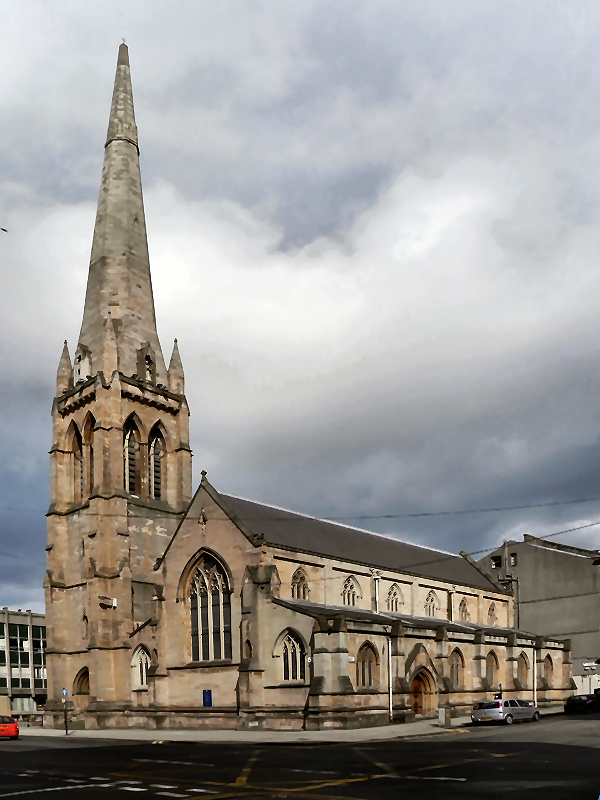
- St Andrew's West
- Location: Glasgow
- Country: Scotland
- Denomination: Church of Scotland
- Website: Church Website

History
- Former name: Renfield St Stephen's
- Status: Parish church

Architecture
- Functional status: Active
- Architect: John Thomas Emmett
- Architectural type: Church
- Style: Gothic Revival
- Years built: 1849-1852
- Groundbreaking: 1849
- Completed: 1852
- Construction cost: £10,000

Administration
- Parish: St Andrew's West

Listed Building – Category B
- Designated: 15 December 1970
- Reference no.: LB32970

St Andrew's West, formerly known as Renfield St Stephen's, is a Church of Scotland parish church in Glasgow. It was designated a Category B listed building in 1970.

== History ==
The church was built between 1849 and 1852 as the parish church of an independent congregation which had split from the George Street Congregational Church in 1849. It was built in an English Gothic revival style on the designs of John Thomas Emmett, costing a total of £10,000. It is built of Kenmure sandstone. By 1874 the congregation had declined and the building was sold to James Baird, an industrialist, who donated the building to the Church of Scotland.

The church was designated a Category B listed building in 1970.

== Congregations ==
After the building became a Church of Scotland parish it was taken over by the Blythswood congregation and became known as Blythswood Parish Church. In 1920, the parish united with St Matthew's parish and became St Matthew's Blythswood Parish Church. St Matthew's parish was established in 1835. In 1960 St Matthew's Blythswood united with St Stephen's Buccleuch and the name was changed to St Stephen's Buccleuch Parish Church. St Stephen's parish was originally established in 1835. In 1966 the church was sold by the parish to the Renfield Street Trust to be used by Renfield Parish Church as its new church after the original Renfield street church closed in 1964 and was later demolished. Renfield street parish was established in 1848 and united with the Church of Scotland in 1929. In 1967, Cowcaddens parish joined the union and the church became known as St Stephen's. In 1969, the church was refurbished and rededicated. The adjoining church centre was also built on the site of tenement flats and a chapel dedicated to St Matthew was constructed. In 1974, Renfield parish and St Stephen's parish, which both used the church, united into one parish to form Renfield St Stephen's. In 2019, Renfield St Stephen's and Anderston Kelvingrove united to form a new parish called St Andrew's West. The current congregation is made up of a union of 15 original congregations.

== Hurricane ==
On 26 December 1998, after a severe hurricane, at a time when the spire was being restored, the same spire collapsed and fell on the church building which caused a large gash in the middle of the church and severe structural damage. The church was once more opened and rededicated on 28 September 2001 by the Moderator of the General Assembly of the Church of Scotland, John Miller. Repairs cost a total of £3,000,000

== Minister ==
The current incumbent is the Rev. Dr. Kleber Machado.

== Organ & Organists ==
The church has a three-manual pipe organ. It was originally built by Willis in Renfield Street Church in 1879 and rebuilt in its current location in 1968 by Hill, Norman & Beard. The collapse of the steeple in 1998 destroyed the original console, and the organ was rebuilt with a new, mobile console by David Wells Organ Builders of Liverpool in 2001.

The pipes are in two chambers - one on either side of the chancel. The console is on a mobile plinth and there are several connection points, to allow it to have a variable position, depending whether being used for church service or recital/concert. Further information about the specification of the organ can be found on the National Pipe Organ Register.

The current organist is Gordon Cree.

The building and the congregations which have inhabited it have had several organists. One of the longest-serving and most notable past organists was well-known solo recitalist, Avis McIntyre FRCO (born 1932), who (as of 2014) remained the only female Fellow of the Royal College of Organists (FRCO) living and working in Scotland. She retired from playing in public sometime after 2010.

== See also ==
- List of tallest buildings and structures in Glasgow
