= Ken Howell (bishop) =

Australian bishop

The Most Reverend Kenneth Howell
- Bishop of the Roman Catholic Diocese of Toowoomba
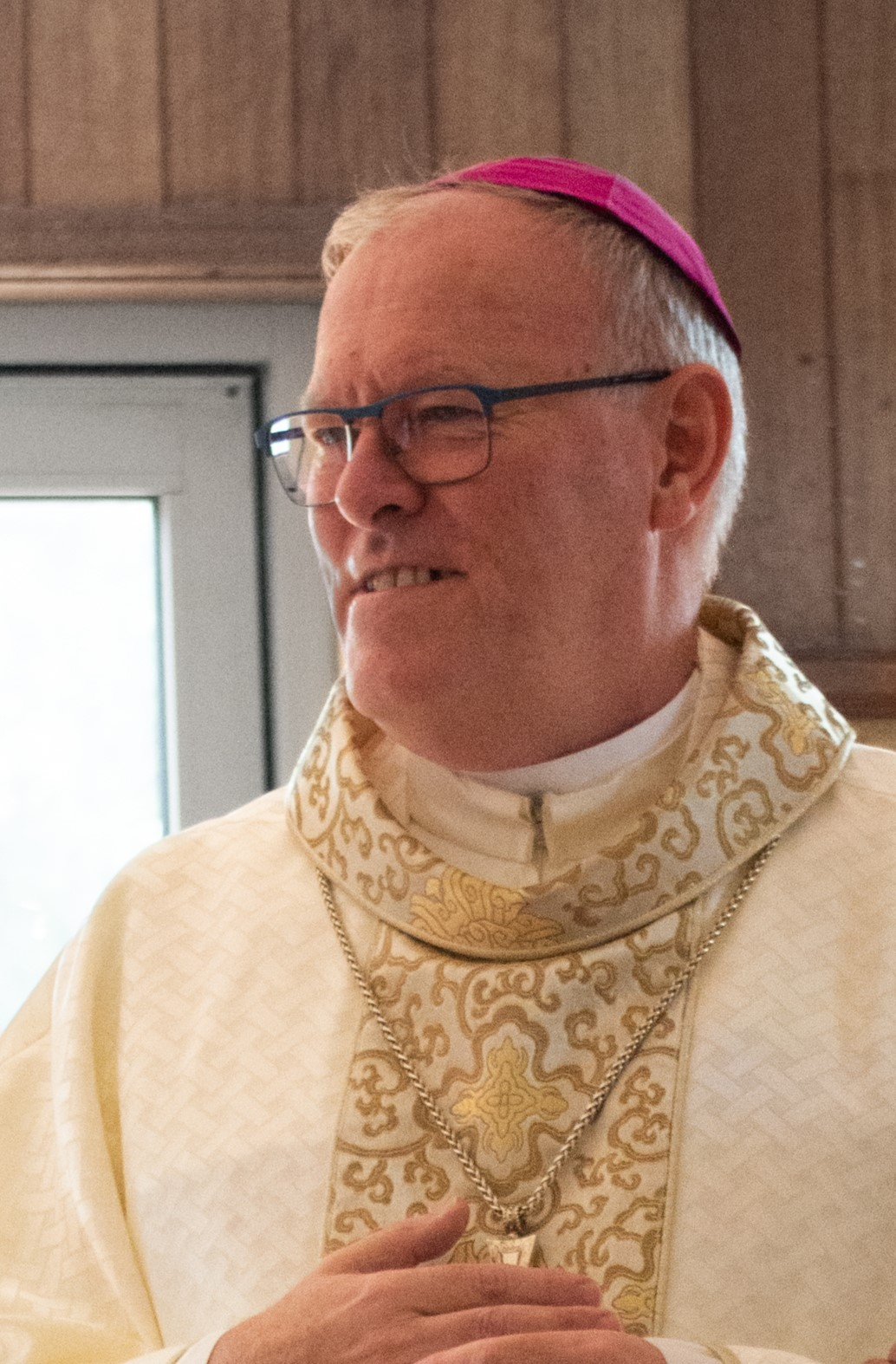
- Bishop Howell in 2024
- Diocese: Toowoomba
- Appointed: 24 May 2023
- Installed: 11 July 2023
- Predecessor: Robert McGuckin

Orders
- Ordination: 24 June 1983 by Archbishop Francis Roberts Rush
- Consecration: 14 June 2017 by Archbishop Mark Coleridge

Personal details
- Born: Kenneth Michael Howell; 20 February 1958 (age 68) Brisbane, Australia
- Denomination: Roman Catholic
- Education: St James College; Pius XII Regional Seminary
- Motto: Parare vias eius (Prepare His way)
- Coat of arms

Styles of Kenneth Howell
- Reference style: The Most Reverend
- Spoken style: My Lord
- Religious style: Bishop

Kenneth Howell (born 20 February 1958) is the bishop of the Roman Catholic Diocese of Toowoomba. He was previously an auxiliary bishop of the Roman Catholic Archdiocese of Brisbane. He was consecrated by Archbishop Mark Coleridge at St Stephen's Cathedral, Brisbane on 14 June 2017. He was appointed Bishop of the Roman Catholic Diocese of Toowoomba by Pope Francis on 24 May 2023.

== Early life ==
Howell was born in Brisbane in 1958 and educated at St James College, Brisbane. After graduating from high school, he joined Queensland Rail and worked as a clerk in the chief engineer's office. He entered Pius XII Regional Seminary (now Holy Spirit Seminary, Brisbane) in 1977.

== Priesthood ==
On 24 June 1983, Howell was ordained by Archbishop Francis Roberts Rush of Brisbane. He served as assistant priest at the parishes of Noosa Heads, Burleigh Heads and St Stephen's Cathedral, Brisbane between 1983 and 1994. Between 1994 and 1997, he completed a Licentiate in Sacred Liturgy at the Pontifical Institute Sant’Anselmo in Rome.

He returned to Australia in 1997 and served as Secretary to Archbishop John Bathersby until 2001, while also serving as a priest and then dean at St Stephen's Cathedral, Brisbane. He also served as the vice rector of the Holy Spirit Seminary, Brisbane between 2002 and 2008. He became the administrator of St Mary's Parish, South Brisbane in 2008 and Parish Priest at Burleigh Heads in 2013.

== Episcopacy ==
On 28 March 2017, Pope Francis appointed Howell as auxiliary bishop of the Roman Catholic Archdiocese of Brisbane following the resignation of Monsignor Joseph John Oudeman OFMCap. He was given the titular see of Thamugadi and was consecrated on 14 June 2017 by Archbishop Mark Coleridge. On 1 February 2021, he was appointed Vicar General of the Archdiocese of Brisbane.

On 24 May 2023, Pope Francis appointed Howell to the Roman Catholic Diocese of Toowoomba after accepting the resignation of Bishop Robert McGuckin.

He was installed at St Patrick's Cathedral on 11 July 2023.

On 3 July 2025, Howell ordained BJ Perrett at the diocesan cathedral. Perrett became the youngest Catholic priest in Australia at the time, at the age of 25. The previous holder, Nathan Webb was ordained in Toowoomba in 2022.

Catholic Church titles
Preceded by Pedro Collar Noguera	— TITULAR — Titular Bishop of Thamugadi; 2017–2023	Succeeded by
Preceded by Robert McGuckin	Bishop of Toowoomba; 2023–present	Incumbent
