= Game of Wool: Britain's Best Knitter =

- Genre: Reality; Game show
- Creative director: Joff Wilson
- Presented by: Tom Daley
- Judges: Di Gilpin; Sheila Greenwell
- Country of origin: United Kingdom
- Original language: English
- No. of series: 1
- No. of episodes: 8

Production
- Production locations: Ayrshire, Scotland, UK
- Running time: 50 minutes
- Production companies: Hello Halo Productions; Banijay Entertainment S.A.

Original release
- Network: Channel 4
- Release: 2 November 2025 – present

Related
- The Great British Bake Off; The Great Pottery Throw Down; The Great British Sewing Bee; All That Glitters: Britain's Next Jewellery Star

Game of Wool: Britain's Best Knitter is a British reality show, where knitters compete to be named "Britain's best knitter".

A spin-off of the format of The Great British Bake Off, the programme is presented by Tom Daley, with the judging being done by Di Gilpin and Sheila Greenwell. Filming took place in an Ayrshire barn, which came to be referred to as "The Yarn Barn". The series began airing on Channel 4 on 2 November 2025.

== Series format ==
The show format is similar to The Great British Sewing Bee in that each episode features challenges which are to be completed within certain time periods. The series starts with ten knitters, with one being eliminated each episode. The final will feature the three final knitters.

Each episode contains two challenges. There is a Solo Challenge, where the individual knitters are tasked with creating a bespoke item within a specified time. There is also a Team Challenge where the knitters are grouped together to work on a joint project, also within a specified time.

== The Knitters ==
Knitter	Age	Occupation	Place of Residency	Placement
Ailsa	30	Ferry company assistant	North Ayrshire	Runner-up
Dipti	42	Library worker	Nottingham	7th
Gordon	47	Cruise ship singer	East Ayrshire	10th
Holger	55	Fashion Designer	London	1st
Isaac	23	Cybersecurity student	Milton Keynes	4th
Lydia	32	Charity partnerships director	Hertfordshire	Runner-up
Meadow	18	Fashion student	Belfast	9th
Simon	42	Builder and ex-Royal Marine	Kent	5th
Stephanie	65	Life coach	Derby	8th
Tracy	63	Psychotherapist	London	6th

== Results and Eliminations ==
Contestant won "Knitter of the Week"
Knitter was safe and got through to next round
Knitter was "Cast Off" and eliminated

Knitter	1	2	3	4	5	6	7	8
Holger		WIN			WIN		WIN	WIN
Ailsa	WIN							RUNNER-UP
Lydia			WIN			WIN		RUNNER-UP
Isaac				WIN			ELIM	
Simon						ELIM		
Tracy					ELIM			
Dipti				ELIM				
Stephanie			ELIM					
Meadow		ELIM						
Gordon	ELIM							

== Episodes ==
=== Episode 1 ===
The Solo Challenge required contestants to create a modern twist of the Fair Isle tank top within twelve hours. The Team Challenge consisted of two teams, each made up of five knitters, who had to knit a fitted sofa cover within ten hours. Ailsa was crowned "Knitter of the Week" and Gordon was "cast off" or eliminated.

=== Episode 2: Icons Week ===
The Solo Challenge required contestants to create a two-piece outfit for two Italian greyhounds within 12 hours. The Team Challenge saw the knitters split into three teams of three, and they were to make an iconic 80s jumper within 10 hours. Holger was named "Knitter of the Week". Meadow was cast off.

=== Episode 3: Holiday Week ===
The Solo Challenge saw the knitters having to create swimwear, which were modelled by Team GB divers. The Team Challenge saw the remaining knitters pair up in order to create a crocheted deck chair sling. For this challenge, the judges were joined by crochet expert Janie Crow. Lydia won this episode for her knitted swimsuit. Stephanie was cast off.

=== Episode 4: Kids Week ===
The Solo Challenge saw the knitters having to make a crocheted costume a kid can wear to a fancy dress party. The costumes were then modelled by two-year-old children. The Team Challenge saw the remaining knitters create wall-hangings for a child's bedroom. Isaac won this episode, and Dipti was cast off.

=== Episode 5: Texture Week ===
The Solo Challenge saw the knitters creating Amigurumi figurines. The Team Challenge saw the remaining six knitters form into three pairs, with each team creating a slouchy cardigan using chunky wool. Holger won this episode, and Tracy was cast off.

=== Episode 6: Statement Week ===
The Solo Challenge saw each of the five remaining knitters create two jewellery pieces - a coordinated necklace and bracelet set - which the judges wanted to be high-end and made a statement. The episode's other Challenge saw the knitters tasked with making an identical lace patterned panel, which was to be part of a large five-panelled lampshade. Isaac won the Team Challenge. Lydia won this episode, and Simon was cast off.

=== Episode 7: Semi-final ===
The Group Challenge saw the four remaining knitters pair off into teams of two, to create a catwalk worthy dress constructed primarily from donated Aran wool jumpers. The episode's Solo Challenge saw the knitters tasked with making a refashioned bag, using material that has been refashioned into a yarn that is then knitted to create a bag. Holger won this episode, and Isaac was cast off.

=== Episode 8: Final ===
In the final, the Group Challenge was to yarnbomb a Royal Mail pillar box, creating knitted versions of the show's host and judges, using knitting techniques showcased in the previous episodes. The episode's Solo Challenge the knitters tasked with making a hat, reflecting their own personality. Holger won the final, with his trophy being a pair of golden knitting needles.

== Critical reception ==
The show received mixed reviews. The Independent's Charlotte O'Sullivan, a self-confessed non-knitter or crocheter, reviewed it favourably, giving it five stars and calling it "a privilege to watch these talented, tolerant and thin-skinned folk compete."

iNews's Sadhbh O'Sullivan, an ardent knitter, had a more negative review, calling the show "perplexing, ill thought out and often bad TV". Her review noted that stranded colourwork is confused with Fair Isle in the first episode, which enraged Shetland Islanders; that many of the projects are ridiculous, particularly swimwear; and wished for more technical skill and more exacting critique. She also suggested that crocheting and knitting be made clear to be different crafts instead of insisting the contestants use both.

== See also ==
- Handmade: Britain's Best Woodworker
- The Great Pottery Throw Down
- All That Glitters: Britain's Next Jewellery Star
