= Moira Anderson =

Scottish singer

Moira Anderson OBE
- Born: 5 June 1938 (age 88); Kirkintilloch, Dunbartonshire, Scotland
- Education: Royal Scottish Academy of Music and Drama
- Occupations: singer, host
- Years active: 1960－2010
- Notable work: Moira Anderson Sings (1968); Stars On Sunday (1969–1979)

Moira Anderson OBE (born 5 June 1938) is a Scottish singer.

== Life and career ==
Moira Anderson was born on 5 June 1938 in Kirkintilloch, Dunbartonshire, Scotland. She was educated at Lenzie Academy, She then attended the Royal Scottish Academy of Music and Drama in Glasgow, before getting her big break in the media after a successful audition at the BBC.

She landed her first job in the media, presenting the radio programme Can't Help Singing where she sang with some prestigious names from the world of opera. She went on to make many appearances in the TV series The White Heather Club hosted by Andy Stewart.

She subsequently hosted her own television show, the popular Moira Anderson Sings on BBC1 in 1968.

In her early career Anderson made frequent appearances alongside fellow Scottish music stars, including Kenneth McKellar. The pairing of Anderson and McKellar was celebrated in the 1971 "Two Ronnies" spoof sketch (Programme 3, 1st Series) featuring "Kenneth Anderson" and "Moira McKellar", in which Ronnie Corbett's Ken described Ronnie Barker's (rather hefty) Moira as "that beautiful lump of Dundee cake". In the early 1980s she made a successful album of duets with Sir Harry Secombe. She recorded "A Perfect Day" by Carrie Jacobs-Bond. Her musical directors over the years have included Peter Knight, Peggy O'Keefe, Nick Ingman and Gordon Cree. She has recorded many albums, including an Ivor Novello collection, conducted by Robin Stapleton, and made many appearances on the BBC TV's popular, long running series, The Good Old Days.

She received an OBE in July 1970. In 2010, she sang two songs at the funeral of Sir Norman Wisdom.

Anderson lives, as of 2016, in retirement on the Isle of Man with her husband of over 50 years, Stuart Macdonald.
