= Robert McGuckin =

Bishop of the Roman Catholic Diocese of Toowoomba

The Most Reverend Robert McGuckin
- Emeritus Bishop of Toowoomba
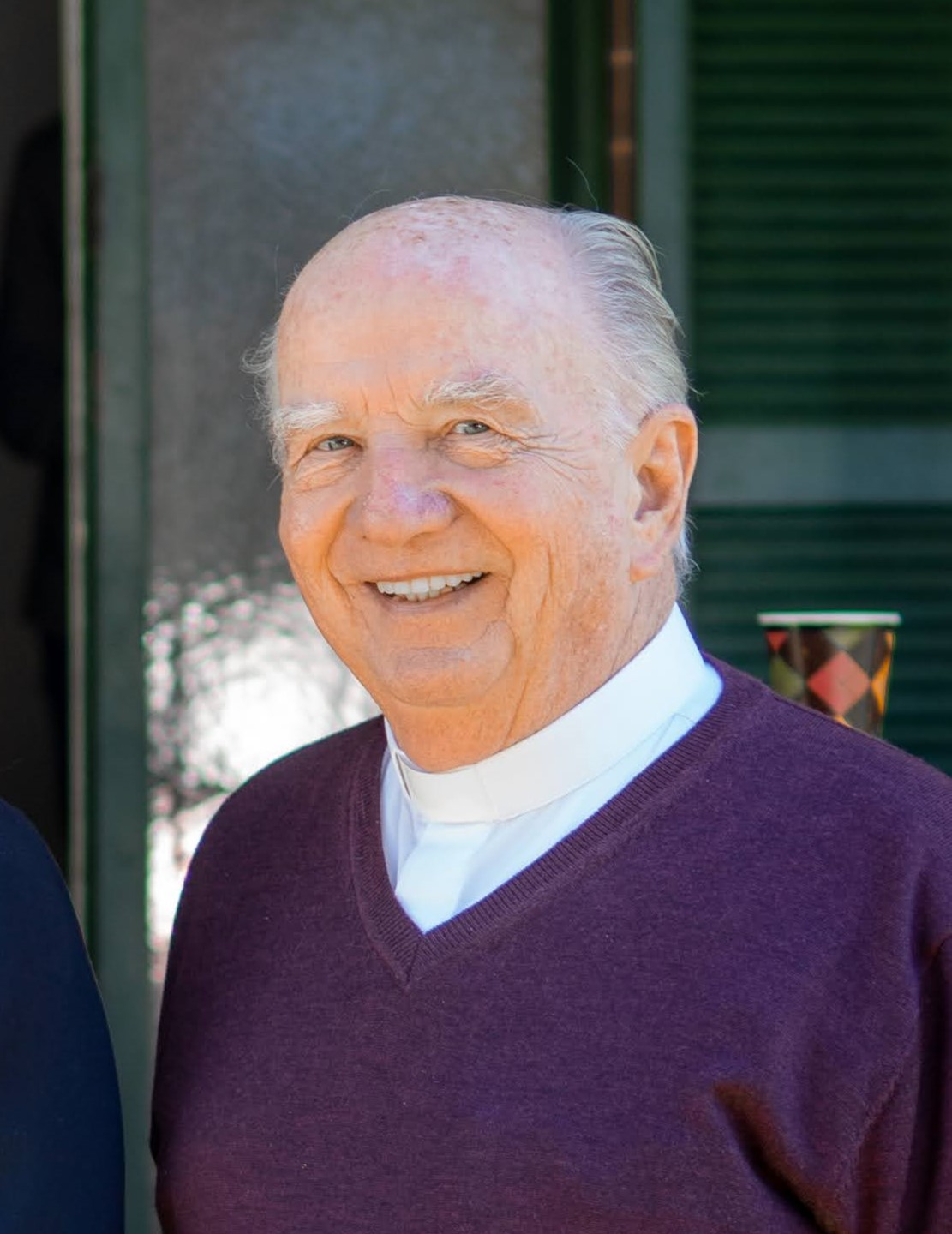
- McGuckin in 2021
- Province: Brisbane
- Diocese: Roman Catholic Diocese of Toowoomba
- Installed: 11 July 2012
- Term ended: 11 July 2023
- Predecessor: Bill Morris
- Successor: Kenneth Howell
- Other posts: Moderator of the Curia and Episcopal Vicar for Health and Social Welfare

Orders
- Ordination: 20 October 1973 by Bishop James Carroll
- Consecration: 11 July 2012 by Archbishop Mark Coleridge

Personal details
- Born: 28 January 1944 (age 82) Marrickville, New South Wales, Australia
- Denomination: Roman Catholic Church
- Profession: Cleric
- Education: St Columba's Seminary; St Patrick's Seminary, Manly; Saint Paul University, Ottawa
- Motto: Manet in dilectione mea (Remain in my love)
- Coat of arms

Robert McGuckin (born 28 January 1944 in Marrickville, New South Wales) is a retired Catholic Bishop who was the Bishop of Toowoomba in Queensland, Australia, from July 2012 until his retirement in 2023.

== Early life ==
McGuckin was born in Marrickville on 28 January 1944.

McGuckin completed his elementary studies at St Pius Primary School, Enmore and his secondary education at De la Salle College, Ashfield, then at the Sutherland Shire Evening College and the Metropolitan Business College. In 1967 he entered St Columba's Seminary, Springwood and, in 1970, he continued his training for the priesthood at St Patrick's Seminary, Manly. He later earned a master's degree and a Licentiate of Canon Law at Saint Paul University, Ottawa.

== Pastoral ministry ==
On 20 October 1973, he was ordained a priest for the Roman Catholic Archdiocese of Sydney. After ordination, he served as the Parochial Vicar (1973–1975); an official of the Regional Court of New South Wales (1975–1997); administrator of the parish of Mascot (1976–1978); administrator of the parish of Botany (1978–1981); studies in Ottawa, Ontario, Canada (1981–1984); administrator of the parish of Rosebery (1984–1986); as a resident priest in the parish of Blacktown (1986–1997).

In 1993, he was incardinated in the Roman Catholic Diocese of Parramatta where he was appointed as Judicial Vicar (1991–1997); diocesan administrator sede vacante (1997); and Vicar General and Moderator of the Curia (1998–2012). In the Diocese of Parramatta, he was also the Episcopal Vicar for Consecrated Life and for the Pastoral Care of Health Workers.

In addition, he served as President of the Canon Law Society of Australia and New Zealand (1999–2006); Professor of Canon Law at University of Notre Dame Australia, Sydney; as Judge of the Court of Appeal for New Zealand and Australia; as the Judicial Vicar of the Court of Appeal for the Episcopal Conference of the Pacific; and as Director of the Institute of Tribunal Practice, affiliated with the Catholic Institute of Sydney.

Among other roles, he has worked in pastoral care in numerous parishes, as a professor of canon law and as a judge of the Roman Catholic Appeals Tribunal of Australia and New Zealand.

On 14 May 2012, Pope Benedict XVI named McGuckin, who had been serving as vicar general and moderator of the curia of the Roman Catholic Diocese of Parramatta, as bishop-elect of the Toowoomba diocese following the removal of Bill Morris. His episcopal consecration took place on 11 July 2012. Chief consecrator was Archbishop Mark Coleridge of Brisbane with Bishop Anthony Fisher OP (Bishop of Parramatta) and the apostolic nuncio, Bishop Lazarotto.

On 25 June 2022, McGuckin ordained Nathan Webb to the presbyterate at the age of 24, making him the youngest Catholic priest in Australia.

On 24 May 2023, Pope Francis appointed Kenneth Howell to the Roman Catholic Diocese of Toowoomba after accepting the resignation of Bishop Robert McGuckin.

McGuckin retired to his home state of New South Wales.

Catholic Church titles
Preceded by Bill Morris, MSC	6th Catholic Bishop of Toowoomba; 2011-2023	Succeeded by Ken Howell
