= Gordon Cree =

Background information
- Born: 14 July 1977 (age 48)
- Genres: Classical, Jazz, Easy Listening
- Occupations: Singer, actor, musician & entertainer
- Instruments: Vocals, piano, organ, trumpet, percussion
- Years active: 1995–present
- Website: www.gordoncree.co.uk

Gordon Charles Cree BMus FGMS (born 14 July 1977, Ayrshire) is a Scottish musician who also performs as a singer, light entertainer and actor.

== Early life and education ==
Gordon Cree was born and brought up in a working class home in Ayrshire, Scotland, UK. After being educated at local primary and secondary schools, and at the unusually young age of 16, he was admitted as an undergraduate student at the Royal Scottish Academy of Music and Drama in Glasgow where he graduated Bachelor of Music in 1998, aged 20. Following his formal education he was mentored in piano versatility and musical direction with Peggy O'Keefe, studied orchestral scoring and arranging with Brian Fahey and organ with Professor George McPhee at Paisley Abbey.

== Career ==
He was the musical director for many seasons at the famous Gaiety Theatre, Ayr and has been personal accompanist and musical director to several well-known artistes, most prolifically Moira Anderson and Anita Harris. He worked for a time in the USA with legendary opera star, Marilyn Horne and has played frequently for touring operas.

As a solo singer, performer and light entertainer, he frequently appears aboard cruise liners and in variety shows throughout the UK, including in "The Good Old Days" at the Leeds City Varieties and as part of the Players' Theatre company in London venues such as Wilton's Music Hall.

He was, for some years, a fixture - both alone and with his trio - at Gleneagles Hotel for Sunday lunch, special functions and during the festive season.

He has been a regular conductor for the Scottish concerts mounted by Raymond Gubbay International.

He is the organist and director of music of St. Andrew's West Parish Church (formerly Renfield St. Stephens), which is one of the largest and most imposing churches in Glasgow's City Centre, almost directly opposite his old stomping ground at the King's Theatre.

As of 2025, he is one of the team of resident organists (headed by Phil Kelsall MBE) at the Blackpool Tower Ballroom, playing both the Wurlitzer organ, as well as its digital counterpart, for ballroom dancing throughout the year.

=== Composer ===
Cree has published many works, most of them short and very light in nature.

Selected Orchestral Works:

- Capri Suite
- Angela (tribute to Angela Morley)
- Concertino (for organ and string orchestra)
- Champagne Flutes
- Fiddlers Free
- Havanaise (for violin and orchestra)
- Petite Marche Cérémoniale
- Suite for Strings
- Nocturne (for cello and orchestra)
- The Bognor Bugler's Return (for trumpet and orchestra)
- The Bognor Bugler's Farewell (for trumpet and orchestra)
- Shades of Heather (for tuned percussion and orchestra)
- Rhona Og Mhaiseach (miniature in the style of a Gaelic air for solo harp and strings)
- Benquhat (march for brass band)
- The Blue Angel (rhumba for orchestra)
- La Torre Salón de Baile (The Tower Ballroom Rhumba) (rhumba for orchestra)

Solo Organ Works:

- Prelude
- Meditation
- Aria
- Trumpet Tune
- Toccata on Adeste Fideles

For Solo Guitar:

- Pequeña Melodia

Popular Music:

- Scotland, My Song Forever (song)

== Personal life ==
He has been in a relationship with operatic and concert mezzo-soprano, Cheryl Forbes, since 2007. They have been married since 2012.

In 2025, he was the first ever "cast-off" (contestant to be eliminated) on Channel 4's, "Game of Wool," hosted by Tom Daley.

== Charity work ==
He is well known for his support of various charity through his performance and endorsement. He has been active for many years on behalf of the Scottish Showbusiness Benevolent Fund (and as of 2022 is its president), The Grand Order of Water Rats, he formerly sat on the Master Court of the Trades House of Glasgow and is an Executive Founding Trustee of the Ayrshire (East) Foodbank which he established alongside his wife, Cheryl Forbes.

He was also the co-founder and organiser of a large-scale annual musical event which has raised tens of thousands of pounds for Scottish charities, including the Ayrshire Hospice, C.H.A.S., Combat Stress, Sight-Savers, Erskine Hospital and Food for Africa.

A freemason, he is a member of Chelsea Lodge No. 3098, the membership of which is made up of entertainers, and into which he was initiated at Freemasons' Hall, Great Queen Street, London.
