= Peggy O'Keefe =

Australian-Scottish musical artist (1928–2019)

Background information
- Born: Margaret Patricia O'Keefe; 7 April 1928; Melbourne, Victoria, Australia
- Died: 31 March 2019 (aged 90) Glasgow, Scotland
- Genres: Jazz, easy listening, classical
- Occupations: Pianist, bandleader, television and radio presenter
- Instruments: Piano, vocals
- Years active: 1949–2004

Peggy O'Keefe (7 April 1928 – 31 March 2019) was an Australian-Scottish pianist, bandleader, and television and radio presenter.

== Life ==
Margaret Patricia O'Keefe was born on 7 April 1928 on a farm in Wangoom, near the city of Warrnambool, approximately 150 miles (250 kilometers) from Melbourne. After a good academic and musical education at a convent boarding school (St Ann's College) she attended the Melbourne University Music Conservatorium, where she studied violin, piano, singing and harp. While there, she was a classmate of Douglas Gamley.

== Career ==
On graduating from the Conservatorium in 1949, she had brief spells working in the Post Office, teaching music in a private girls' school, and working in the piano department of Myer, the famous Melbourne department store, where she would play the latest hits of the day on the department's pianos in the hope – if not of selling the piano – of selling copies of the sheet music.

During the 1940s and 1950s, ABC employed a staff pianist by the name of Margot Sheridan, who accompanied singers, instrumentalists and played in ensembles on radio, and later in television. Peggy admired her versatility and musicianship very much, and decided she wanted to be like her. Following a successful audition at ABC in the 1950s (for which she played her own arrangement of "Tico Tico"), Peggy started appearing regularly as accompanist and ensemble pianist on broadcasts, while simultaneously playing with her trio in Melbourne nightspots, accompanying cabarets by artistes such as a young Barry Humphries, Juanita Hall and a one-off, impromptu performance by Frank Sinatra.

After the breakdown of her first marriage in 1960, she travelled to London, where she picked up where she had left off in Australia. She had not been there long before she was playing in jazz trios and quartets in establishments such as The Satire Rooms, The Riverside Club and The Stork Rooms (where her "tea break" cover pianist was a young Dudley Moore). It was during this spell that she played for – and rubbed shoulders with – artistes like Sammy Davis Jr., Tony Bennett, Dame Cleo Laine, Dizzy Gillespie, Oscar Peterson, Marion Montgomery, and Helen Merrill, while renewing an old and rather special friendship with legendary bass player, Ray Brown.

During this time she met and teamed up with double bass player Ricky Fernandez and drummer Rudi Celerio, with whom she became "The Peggy O'Keefe Trio".

Always modest and self-effacing, she declined to appear at Ronnie Scott's with Cleo Laine on several occasions, and also to appear as a supporting act for Oscar Peterson, who invited her to open his London concert and then perform a two-piano number with him. She declined on the grounds of her not being a "real jazz musician". Laine and Peterson both disagreed, but were unable to convince her.

In 1962, she signed a contract for a residency at the newly-opened nightspot, The Gay Gordon, at 21 Royal Exchange Square, Glasgow – a venue that offered dinner, dancing and cabaret – and, along with Ricky and Rudi, travelled to Glasgow to work the contract for six months. During this time, she was also discovered by the BBC and subsequently presented many live music broadcasts from the restaurant. At the end of this contract, they transferred to Reo Stakis' Chevalier Casino (where they were augmented to become "The Peggy O'Keefe Quartet" by the addition of Jimmy Feighan on vibraphone). Again, she also broadcast on television from here, with guests from the aforementioned list of stars and others, such as Dick Haymes, Matt Monro, and Mark Murphy.

During this time, this venue and programme's popularity was acknowledged by the release of an LP, Mood Chevalier (EMI/Waverley ZLP2083), which featured the quartet with guests Ian McHaffie on guitar and Dougie Kerr on trumpet. This was an album of jazz standards, on which O'Keefe both sang and played piano.

O'Keefe went on to present a long list of music programmes both on television and radio right through until the 1980s, and continued to play piano in broadcasts through the 1990s. She was undoubtedly one of the busiest pianists used by the BBC and STV, since – as well as her own programmes on television and radio – she was acting as a staff pianist at both stations, accompanying auditions, recitals and broadcasts, as well as playing piano within most of the BBC's ensembles – from jazz trios, through chamber groups and big bands to the BBC Radio Orchestra and the BBC Scottish Symphony Orchestra.

== Radio ==
Radio programmes she presented and contributed to were virtually innumerable, but included The Perils of Peggy (a zany, Goons-inspired music-based comedy programme, written by fellow-pianist, Bernard Sumner), Sweet Sunday and A Date with Peggy. She also provided the musical examples from the piano on BBC Radio 2's quiz show Mad About Musicals, presented by Paul Nicholas in the mid-1990s.

== Television ==
Television programmes on which she regularly featured included Tonight at the Chevalier Casino, Today Is... (with John Toye), A Date with Peggy (a TV follow-on from the radio programme), The Art Sutter Show and Housecall. She contributed musically to countless other television specials and episodes.

== "One O'Clock Gang" misconception ==
Contrary to a popular misconception, O-Keefe was never featured on STV's "One O'Clock Gang:" the resident ensemble was actually The Tommy Maxwell Quartet. This confusion appears to come from the presence on the programme of Moira Briody, who was of similar appearance, of similar Irish extraction, and who also played the piano and sang. In reverse to O'Keefe, she was born in the British Isles and ultimately emigrated to Australia.

This misconception was further perpetuated by O'Keefe's daily appearances (although at 5pm) on Today Is..., and also by her work as accompanist on Housecall, which replaced the One O'Clock Gang in its timeslot after its demise, and which was also presented by One O-Clock Gang member Dorothy Paul.

== Personal life ==
While still residing in Melbourne, O'Keefe briefly married Edward Myszkowski, a native of Poland who had come to Australia as a student. He was the grandson of a Polish Count and former Auschwitz prisoner of war. On the breakdown of the marriage in 1960, she travelled to London, and then two years later to Scotland, and remained a British citizen thereafter.

In 1971, she met and married a second husband – a Swedish businessman with whom she had two sons. The marriage ended in 1979.

She is the mother of techno DJ Lars Sandberg, better known to techno audiences as Funk d'Void.

She is the former stepmother (via her second marriage) of international jazz pianist and Acid Jazz recording artist Ulf Sandberg.

== Retirement and later years ==
In the later years of her career, and after the demise of in-house musicians and music departments in broadcasting, O'Keefe kept working in theatre, recital and concert as an accompanist to artistes such as Moira Anderson and Kenneth McKellar, as well as keeping her jazz trio going and being involved playing piano and celeste for light music and film music programmes by larger orchestras, such as the Royal Scottish National Orchestra, The Glasgow Pops Orchestra, The City of Glasgow Philharmonic Orchestra, The Arthur Blake Orchestra, The BBC Scottish Symphony Orchestra, The Glyn Bragg Orchestra and the Gordon Cree Concert Orchestra.

O'Keefe continued to work leading her trio for corporate functions, as a fixture at Sunday lunch in Gleneagles Hotel and as accompanist to Scottish entertainers (most notably Peter Morrison, Anne Lorne Gillies and Gordon Cree). Declining health following an unsuccessful knee replacement in 2004 saw an end to her professional career.

== Death ==
Peggy O'Keefe died peacefully in a Glasgow nursing home on 31 March 2019, aged 90, following several years of declining health.
