= Diocese of Toowoomba =

Catholic diocese in Queensland, Australia

Diocese of Toowoomba Dioecesis Tuumbanus
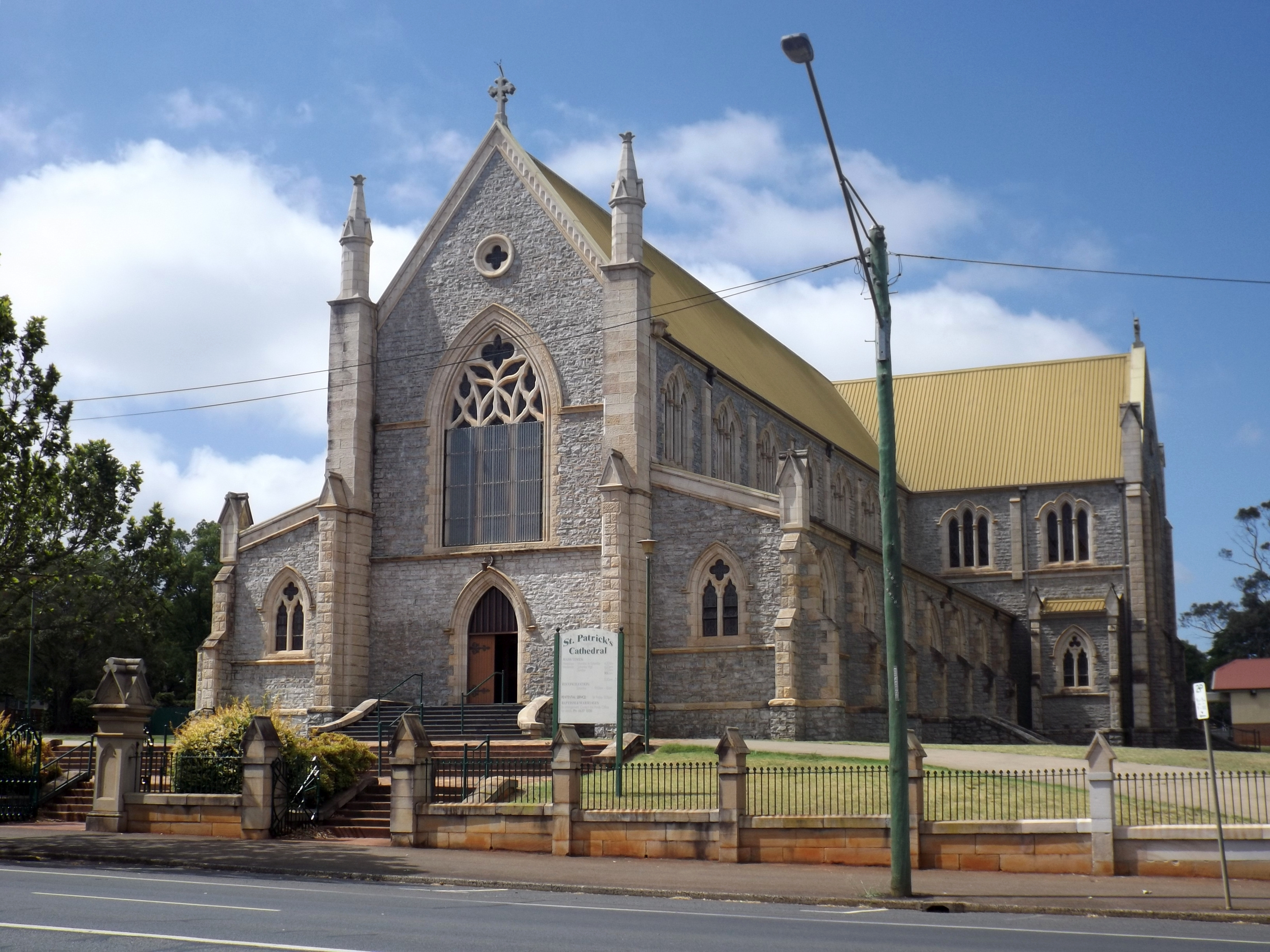
- St Patrick's Cathedral, Toowoomba, 2014

Location
- Country: Australia
- Territory: Darling Downs and South West regions of Queensland
- Ecclesiastical province: Province of Brisbane
- Metropolitan: Brisbane
- Coordinates: 27°33′41″S 151°57′53″E

Statistics
- Area: 487,456 km^{2} (188,208 sq mi)
- Population: Total; Catholics: (as of 2004); ▼232,900; ▲65,912 (▲28.3%%)
- Parishes: 35

Information
- Denomination: Roman Catholic
- Rite: Latin Rite
- Established: 28 May 1929
- Cathedral: St Patrick's Cathedral, Toowoomba
- Patron saint: Mary of the Southern Cross, Blessed Virgin Mary
- Secular priests: 50

Current leadership
- Pope: Leo XIV
- Bishop: Kenneth Howell
- Bishops emeritus: Robert McGuckin; William Morris

Map

Website
- Roman Catholic Diocese of Toowoomba

The Roman Catholic Diocese of Toowoomba is a suffragan diocese of the Archdiocese of Brisbane, established in 1929, covering the Darling Downs and south west regions of Queensland, Australia.

The diocese covers an area of 487,000 square kilometres (188,000 sq mi). with 48 priests and 57 members of religious orders. There are 77,400 Catholics among the 276,700 total population within the diocese's borders.

St Patrick's Cathedral is the seat of the Catholic Bishop of Toowoomba.

== History ==
In 1929, the Diocese of Toowoomba was excised from the Roman Catholic Archdiocese of Brisbane.

=== Recent history ===
Bishop Bill Morris was appointed in 1992 to head the Toowoomba diocese. In 2006 he released a pastoral letter calling for discussion of the ordination of married men and the ordination of women to compensate for the lack of priests in his large diocese.

An apostolic visitation of the diocese was conducted by Charles J. Chaput OFM Cap., then Archbishop of Denver, during April 2007. Discussions continued between Morris and the Vatican for several years.

On 1 May 2011, Bishop Morris announced his early retirement at age 67, stressing the fact that he had not resigned. On 2 May 2011, the Holy See removed Morris from pastoral care of the diocese, attracting international press coverage. The Holy See appointed Brian Vincent Finnigan, Auxiliary Bishop of the Roman Catholic Archdiocese of Brisbane, to serve as Apostolic Administrator of the Diocese.

On 14 May 2012, it was announced that Pope Benedict XVI had named the Reverend Monsignor Robert McGuckin as bishop-elect of the Toowoomba diocese. He was installed on 11 July.

On 24 May 2023, Pope Francis announced Bishop Kenneth Howell would be the Bishop of the Diocese of Toowoomba, after accepting the resignation of Bishop Robert McGuckin.

== Bishops ==
=== Ordinaries ===
The following have served as Bishops of Toowoomba:

Order	Name	Date enthroned	Reign ended	Term of office	Reason for term end
1	James Byrne	28 May 1929	11 February 1938	8 years, 259 days	Died in office
2	Joseph Basil Roper	13 July 1938	14 October 1952	14 years, 93 days	Resigned and appointed Bishop Emeritus of Toowoomba
3	William Joseph Brennan	7 August 1953	11 September 1975	22 years, 35 days	Died in office
4	Edward Francis Kelly, MSC	19 December 1975	20 November 1992	16 years, 337 days	Retired and appointed Bishop Emeritus
5	William Morris	20 November 1992	2 May 2011	18 years, 163 days	Retired and appointed Bishop Emeritus
6	Robert McGuckin	11 July 2012	24 May 2023	10 years, 317 days	Retired and appointed Bishop Emeritus
7	Kenneth Howell	24 May 2023	present	3 years, 196 days	

=== Other priest of this diocese who became bishop ===
- John Alexius Bathersby, appointed Bishop of Cairns in 1986, and subsequently Archbishop of Brisbane.

== Parishes ==
There are currently 35 parishes in the diocese and 42 diocesan priests, organized across five territorial deaneries:

Toowoomba Eastern Deanery:

- St Matthew's (Crows Nest)
- St Joseph's (Helidon)
- St Mary MacKillop (Highfields)
- St Patrick's Cathedral
- St Thomas More's
- St Theresa's

Toowoomba Western Deanery:

- St Francis de Sales' (Millmerran)
- Sacred Heart (Cambooya)
- St Stephen's (Pittsworth)
- Holy Name (Toowoomba North)
- St Monica's (Oakey)
- St Anthony's (Harristown)
- Sacred Heart (Wilsonton)
- Our Lady of Lourdes (Newtown)

Southern Downs Deanery:

- St Mary's (Warwick)
- St Mary's (Goondiwindi)
- Our Lady of the Southern Cross (Inglewood)
- Sts James and John (Clifton)
- St Mary's (Wallangarra)
- Holy Cross (Killarney)
- St Patrick's (Allora)
- St Joseph's (Stanthorpe)
- Sacred Heart (Texas).

Northern Downs Deanery:

- St Joseph's (Dalby)
- St Mary's (Taroom)
- St Mary of the Angels' (Tara)
- Holy Cross (Miles)
- Immaculate Conception (Jandowae)
- Our Lady Help of Christians (Chinchilla)

Western Deanery:

- Sacred Heart (Cunnamulla)
- St Finbarr's (Quilpie)
- St Mary's (Wallumbilla)
- Balonne Catholic Parish (St George)
- St Mary's (Charleville)
- St Columba's (Mitchell)
- All Saints' (Roma)

== Schools ==
The diocese has the following schools:

- Our Lady of the Southern Cross College, Dalby
- St. Mary's College, Toowoomba
- St Ursula's College, Toowoomba
- St Joseph's College, Toowoomba
- St. John's College, Roma
- St. Patrick's School, Mitchell
- St. Mary's School, Charleville
- St. Finbarr's School, Quilpie
- Sacred Heart School, Cunnamulla
- St Saviour's College, Toowoomba
- Downlands Sacred Heart College, Toowoomba
- Mary MacKillop Catholic College, Toowoomba

== Heritage listings ==
The diocese has a number of heritage-listed sites, including:

- St Patrick's Cathedral, corner of James and Neil Streets, Toowoomba
- Bishop's House, 73 Margaret Street, Toowoomba

== Sexual abuse ==
In February 2014 the Royal Commission into Institutional Responses to Child Sexual Abuse, a royal commission of inquiry initiated in 2013 by the Australian Government and supported by all of its state governments, began an investigation into allegations of child sexual abuse and the response by the Diocesan Catholic Education Office. The former Bishop of Toowoomba, Bill Morris, admitted that "there had been a number of significant systemic failings which led to the failure to properly deal with" the abuse of thirteen young girls at a Toowoomba Catholic primary School in 2007–08.

== See also ==
- Roman Catholicism in Australia
