= Mark Coleridge =

Australian Catholic bishop

The Most Reverend Mark Coleridge DSS
- Metropolitan Archbishop Emeritus of Brisbane
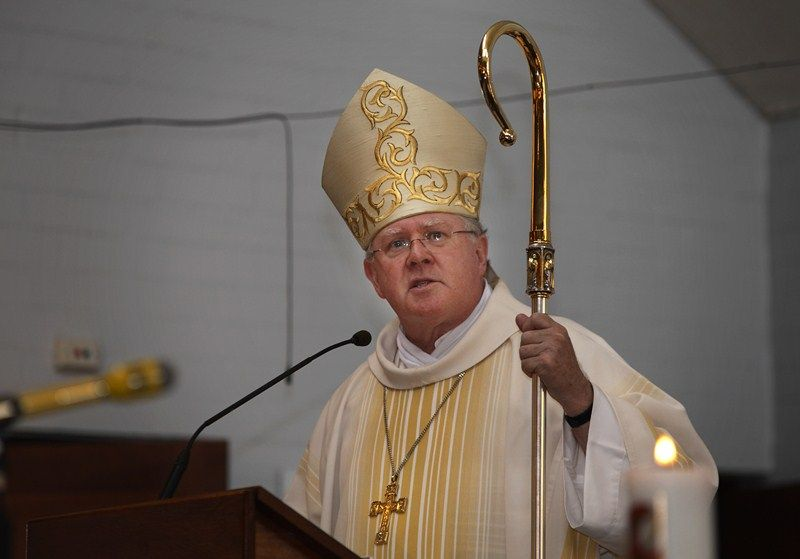
- Coleridge in Canberra, 2011
- Archdiocese: Brisbane
- See: Brisbane
- Appointed: 2 April 2012
- Installed: 11 May 2012
- Term ended: 18 June 2025
- Predecessor: John Bathersby
- Successor: Shane Mackinlay
- Other post: Member of the Pontifical Council for Social Communications (2011–present)
- Previous posts: Archbishop of Canberra–Goulburn (2006–2012); Auxiliary Bishop of Melbourne (2002–2006)

Orders
- Ordination: 18 May 1974 by John Anthony Kelly
- Consecration: 19 June 2002 by Denis Hart

Personal details
- Born: Mark Benedict Coleridge; 25 September 1948 (age 78) Melbourne, Victoria
- Denomination: Catholic Church
- Parents: Bernard and Marjorie (née Harvey) Coleridge
- Education: University of Melbourne; Corpus Christi College, Melbourne
- Motto: Sanguis et Aqua (Blood and Water)
- Coat of arms: Mark Coleridge's coat of arms

Styles of Mark Coleridge
- Reference style: The Most Reverend
- Spoken style: Your Grace
- Religious style: Archbishop

Ordination history of Mark Coleridge
History
Priestly ordination
- Ordained by: John Anthony Kelly (Melbourne aux.)
Episcopal consecration
- Principal consecrator: Denis Hart (Melbourne)
- Co-consecrators: George Pell (Sydney); Francesco Canalini (Apostolic Nuncio to Australia)
Episcopal succession
Bishops consecrated by Mark Coleridge as principal consecrator
- Robert McGuckin: 11 July 2012
- Michael McCarthy: 29 May 2014
- Timothy Harris: 3 May 2017
- Kenneth Howell: 14 Jun 2017

Mark Benedict Coleridge (born 25 September 1948) is an Australian Catholic prelate who was Metropolitan Archbishop of Brisbane from 2012 to 2025. He was previously Archbishop of Canberra–Goulburn (2006–2012) and as an auxiliary bishop of the Metropolitan Archdiocese of Melbourne (2002–2006).

== Life and ordained ministry ==
Mark Coleridge was born in Melbourne, Victoria. The third of five siblings born to Bernard and Marjorie (née Harvey) Coleridge, he was educated at Saint Joseph's School in Tranmere, South Australia, Rostrevor College in Adelaide and St Kevin's College in Melbourne. Contemplating a career in the Australian diplomatic service, he graduated from the University of Melbourne in 1968 with a Bachelor of Arts degree in English and French. As a Melbourne seminarian, he entered Corpus Christi College, then in Werribee and later in Glen Waverley and Clayton.

On 18 May 1974, Coleridge was ordained a priest at St Patrick's Cathedral, Melbourne, by Bishop John A. Kelly, an auxiliary bishop of Melbourne. He worked as a parish priest there until moving to Rome where he earned a Licentiate in Sacred Scripture at the Biblicum in 1984 and a Doctorate in Sacred Scripture with a dissertation on the Infancy Narrative in Luke's Gospel in April 1992. He returned to Melbourne in 1992, where he spent three years at several theology appointments. After some time in Rome devoted to doctoral studies and another stint in Melbourne, in 1997 he was appointed to a position in the Roman Curia at the Secretariat of State, where he spent four years.

=== Episcopate ===
On 3 May 2002, Pope John Paul II appointed Coleridge as an auxiliary bishop of the Archdiocese of Melbourne. On 19 June 2006, Pope Benedict XVI named him as Archbishop of Canberra and Goulburn. On 29 December 2011 he was appointed a member of the Pontifical Council for Social Communications for a five-year renewable term. On 2 April 2012, Pope Benedict XVI named him Metropolitan Archbishop of Brisbane and he was installed on 11 May 2012.

As of 2015 he was a member of the Australian Catholic Bishops' Conference. Coleridge serves on that body's permanent committee, chairs its Commission for Evangelisation and is a member of its Commission for Church Ministry.

The Australian Catholic Bishops' Conference elected Coleridge one of its two delegates to the Synod on the Family in Rome in October 2015. There he served as the relator (reporting secretary) for one of the four English-language working groups.

In November 2017, Coleridge was elected by Australia's bishops to head their commission that organised a plenary council of the church in Australia in 2020. On 4 May 2018 he was elected to a two-year term as president of the bishops' conference.

Coleridge is the grand prior of the Queensland Australia Lieutenancy of the Equestrian Order of the Holy Sepulchre of Jerusalem.

==== Opposition to same-sex marriage ====
In 2017, during the national postal survey on same-sex marriage, Coleridge said he personally believed that the love shared by a same-sex couple could only ever be simply "the love of friends". He noted that children were not permitted to marry their parents, nor siblings permitted to marry one another, though he agreed that the cases of same-sex couples and close relatives were different. He said: "That is not to say that [same-sex couples] are not equal. It's simply saying that they are not the same and that they don't qualify for what we call marriage."

== Gallery ==
Coat of arms as the Archbishop of Canberra and Goulburn

Coat of arms as Archbishop of Brisbane

Catholic Church titles
Preceded by Francis Carroll	Archbishop of Canberra–Goulburn; 2006–2012	Succeeded by Christopher Prowse
Preceded by John Bathersby	Archbishop of Brisbane; 2012–present	Succeeded by incumbent
