= James Byrne (bishop of Toowoomba) =

Irish catholic bishop in Australia (1870–1938)

The Most Reverend James Byrne
- Bishop of Toowoomba
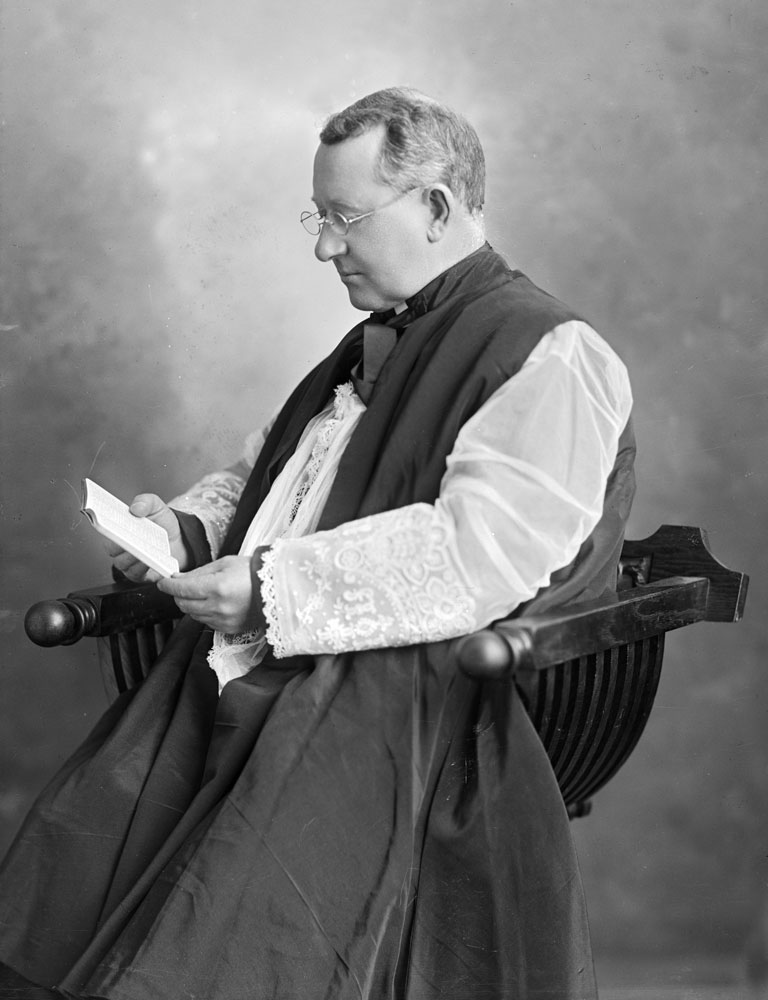
- James Byrne, circa 1920
- Church: Roman Catholic Church
- Diocese: Toowoomba
- Appointed: September 1929
- Term ended: 11 February 1938
- Predecessor: Position established
- Successor: Joseph Basil Roper

Orders
- Ordination: 21 July 1896

Personal details
- Born: James Byrne; 25 July 1870 Ballingarry, County Tipperary, Ireland
- Died: 11 February 1938 (aged 67) Toowoomba, Queensland, Australia
- Buried: Drayton and Toowoomba Cemetery
- Denomination: Roman Catholic
- Education: St. Patrick’s College, Thurles

Dr James Byrne (1870–1938) was an Irish-born priest, who served as the first Roman Catholic Bishop of Toowoomba, in Queensland, Australia.

== Early life ==
James Byrne was born on 25 July 1870 in Ballingarry, County Tipperary, Ireland, the son of James William Byrne, a land steward, and his wife Catharine (née Flannery).

== Religious life ==
Dr Byrne was educated for the priesthood at St. Patrick's College in Thurles, County Tipperary, Ireland, and ordained by the Archbishop of Cashel on 21 July 1896. He volunteered to work in the Roman Catholic Archdiocese of Brisbane in Queensland, Australia. He ministered in Brisbane for more than 20 years, being Administrator of St. Stephen's Cathedral for 12 years. Afterwards he was appointed Vicar-General of the Archdiocese of Brisbane. From 1917 until 1929 he was parish priest at Ipswich. In 1922 he was appointed a domestic prelate to the Pope.

Byrne was appointed as the first Bishop of the Roman Catholic Diocese of Toowoomba in September 1929, a role he undertook until his death in 1938. He was responsible for a number of achievements, including the completion of St Patrick's Cathedral in Toowoomba. At his invitation the Sacred Heart Fathers came to Toowoomba and founded Downlands College. He introduced the Ursuline nuns to Toowoomba, the De La Salle Brothers to Roma, and the Sisters of St Joseph to Texas and St George. He founded new parishes at Tannymorel, Jandowae. and Millmerran. In 1932 he attended the Dublin Congress. The last function Byrne carried out was the opening and blessing of the new church in Goondiwindi.

== Later life ==
Towards the end of 1935 he underwent a major operation in Brisbane, and on recovering went on a trip to New Zealand. He did not return greatly improved in health, and was compelled to seek medical attention in Sydney and Brisbane. In October, 1936, he returned to Toowoomba and continued to be in poor health. His nephew Rev. Father Edward Joyce spent 18 months with him in Toowoomba.

Byrne died in the St Patrick's Presbytery, Toowoomba on the 11 February 1938 aged 68 years. He was survived by two sisters. His funeral was held on Monday 14 February at St Patrick's Cathedral, conducted by James Duhig (Archbishop of Brisbane) and John Heavey (Vicar Apostolic of Cooktown). So many people attended his funeral that hundreds had to remain outside the cathedral during the service and the funeral cortege to the Drayton and Toowoomba Cemetery was over two miles long.

== Legacy ==
The diocesan centre in Toowoomba, is named the James Byrne Centre, in his honour, and the James Byrne road.
