= St Patrick's Cathedral, Toowoomba =

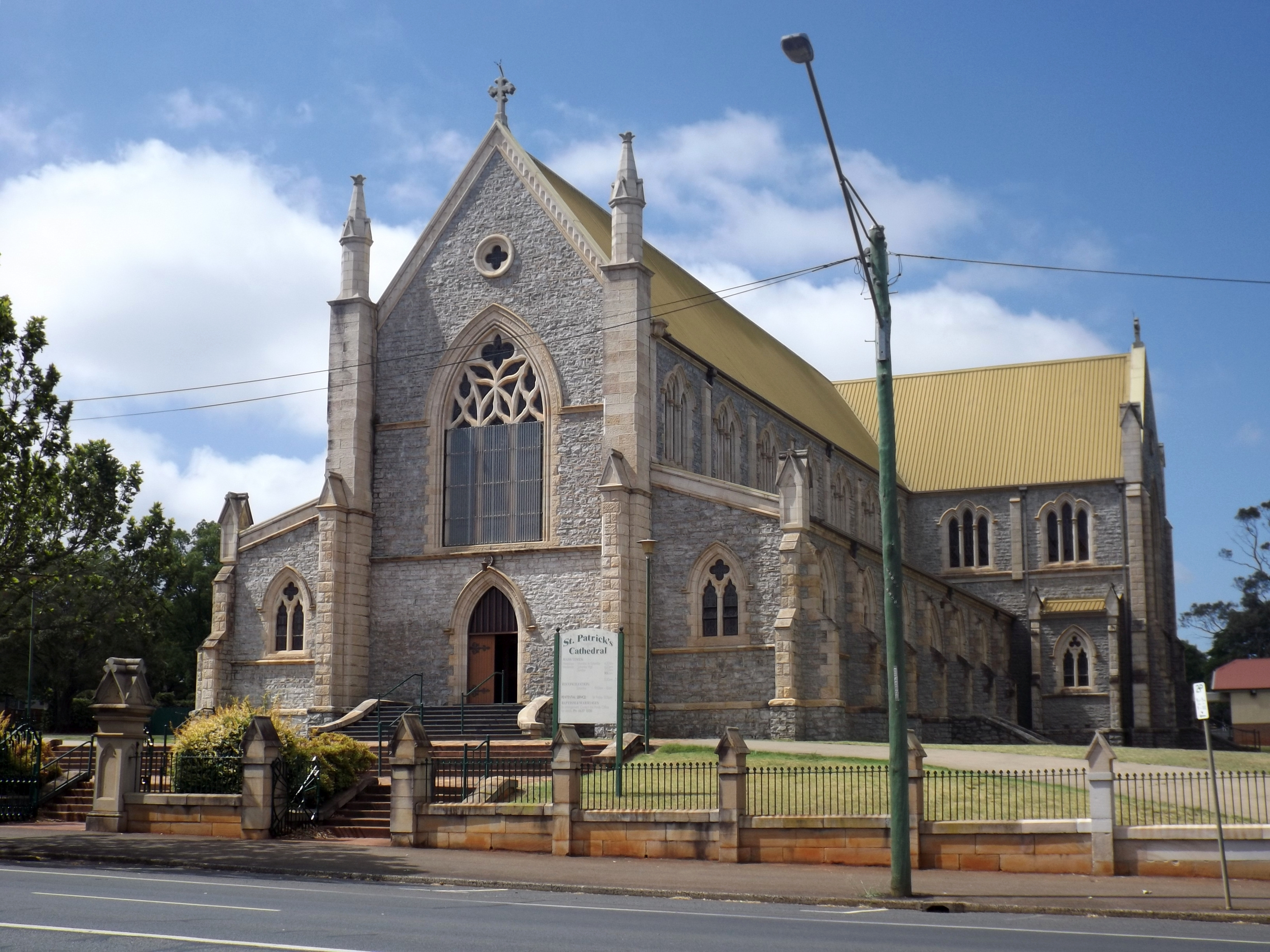
- St Patricks Cathedral, in 2014
- St Patrick's Cathedral, Toowoomba
- 27°34′11″S 151°57′13″E
- Address: James Street, South Toowoomba, Toowoomba, Toowoomba Region, Queensland
- Country: Australia
- Denomination: Roman Catholic

History
- Status: Cathedral
- Founded: 13 May 1883 (Whit Sunday)
- Founder: Archbishop Robert Dunne
- Dedication: Saint Patrick
- Consecrated: 17 March 1889 (St Patrick's Day)

Architecture
- Architect: James Marks
- Architectural type: Church
- Style: Victorian Gothic
- Years built: 1883–1935
- Construction cost: A£8,500

Specifications
- Length: 61 metres (200 ft)
- Width: 31 metres (102 ft)
- Height: 17 metres (56 ft)
- Materials: Blue stone

Administration
- Diocese: Toowoomba

Clergy
- Bishop: Kenneth Howell

Queensland Heritage Register
- Official name: St Patricks Cathedral, St Patrick's Church School
- Type: State heritage (landscape, built)
- Designated: 21 October 1992
- Reference no.: 600844
- Significant period: 1880s, 1930s (historical); 1880s, 1930s (fabric cathedral); 1920s (fabric presbytery)
- Significant components: Garden/grounds, stained glass window/s, chimney/chimney stack, fence/wall – perimeter, residential accommodation – presbytery, tower, trees/plantings, views to, chapel, furniture/fittings, cathedral
- Builders: Godsall & Mayes

St Patrick's Cathedral is a heritage-listed Roman Catholic cathedral on James Street, South Toowoomba, Toowoomba, Toowoomba Region, Queensland, Australia. It was designed by Toowoomba architect James Marks and was built from 1883 to 1935. The site of the cathedral was originally a church and school known as St Patrick's Church School. In 1899, the school was moved to make way for the building of the cathedral and in 1959 renamed as St Saviour's School. St Patrick's Cathedral was added to the Queensland Heritage Register on 21 October 1992.

The cathedral serves as the seat for the Bishop of Toowoomba, currently Kenneth Howell.

== History ==
St Patrick's Cathedral is a dominant Victorian Gothic church built from basalt and located on James Street, Toowoomba. It was designed by James Marks for the then Catholic Toowoomba Mission and was built between 1883 and 1889.

Early church services in the Darling Downs were often an itinerant affair conducted from private houses, inns or courthouses, and the origins of Roman Catholic worship in the region are to be found in the transient rituals conducted during the early 1840s. In 1843, Australia's first Catholic Archbishop, John Bede Polding, accompanied by Benedictine abbott, Dr Henry Gregory, toured the pastoral stations in Moreton Bay and Darling Downs with a portable altar. Along the way they preached to the shepherds they met and it was recorded in June 1843 that they "carried their own blankets with them and preferred sleeping on a sheet of bark on the floor . . . the custom of the Catholic priests . . . was, after a little desultory conversation, to ask if there were any Catholics present and that was all. In the morning the priest would walk out into the bush, accompanied by whoever was of his persuasion and there they would say what they had to say to each other". Five years later, Polding again visited the Darling Downs and that same year Father W. McGinty was appointed parish priest of Ipswich and the Darling Downs. Although McGinty regularly toured the Darling Downs to celebrate Mass, parishioners of the area became more vociferous in their call for a resident priest after Queensland separated from New South Wales in 1859.

By that time, Catholics constituted about a quarter of the population of the Darling Downs and the weight of their collective voices ultimately saw the establishment of the Toowoomba Mission (forerunner of the Roman Catholic Diocese of Toowoomba) and the appointment of Father Fulgentius Hodebourg in September 1862 as parish priest for the area. The following year the first Catholic church in the region, which also served as a school and was known as St Patrick's Church School, was built in Toowoomba on the present site of St Patrick's Cathedral. It was located on a 8,100-square-metre (2-acre) parcel of land at the corner of James and Neil Streets, which had been set aside in September 1858 for the specific purpose of erecting a Catholic church, school and priest's residence. Although the church was a modest timber building, it marked the start of an institutional presence on the Darling Downs for the Roman Catholic faith.

In 1868, Father Robert Dunne was ordained parish priest and it was during his time in Toowoomba that St Patrick's began to flourish. His flock increased steadily and in 1877 his plans included the erection of a cathedral. Father Dunne's grandiose vision for St Patrick's, however, was not immediately realized and extensions only were carried out to the existing church, which were completed on 5 June 1880. The next day St Patrick's Church School was destroyed by fire and the church's services were temporarily transferred to the Hibernian Hall in Ruthven Street. Reputedly, under the supervision of builder Robert Godsall and through the labour of volunteers, a new timber church was erected within two weeks of the old one being destroyed.

When Father Dunne left for Ireland in 1881, even the new timber church was envisaged as merely a temporary substitute for a much grander building. Father Thomas O'Connell was appointed parish priest of Toowoomba to replace Father Dunne and was immediately charged with chairing the Building Committee for the new church. On 13 August 1882 a meeting was held to discuss plans for the church and Archbishop Dunne, who had returned from Ireland and was by that time the Archbishop of Brisbane, suggested the use of stone for construction and beseeched the parishioners to "erect a portion to accommodate the congregation of today, and possibly for the next ten or fifteen years, and that portion might afterwards be added to, making a complete and harmonious whole". A subscription was enthusiastically embraced by those present, with nearly A£1260 pledged before the end of the meeting. Four months later, £900 of the money promised had been collected and it was decided to call for plans for the church and to aim for St Patrick's Day on 17 March 1883 as the day for laying the foundation stone.

In March 1883, despite the receipt of two plans for the church and £1050, Father O'Connell decided it was expedient to delay the laying of the foundation stone until Whit Sunday on 13 May 1883, on which day the ceremony was duly conducted by Archbishop Dunne. That same month, a call for designs and specifications to be submitted with a construction cost of no more than £5000 was posted in the Toowoomba Chronicle as well as in Brisbane and Sydney newspapers. The design of James Marks was the one favoured by the Building Committee and he was awarded a prize of £25 for his submission.

Marks was born in Somerset, England, in 1834 and from the age of 16 he was employed by a Westminster building contracting firm. He eventually trained as a carpenter and worked in the trade until his migration to Queensland in 1866. Marks first established himself as a builder and architect in Dalby before moving to Toowoomba in 1874 where he established the first professional architectural practice on the Darling Downs. The reputation of the firm grew rapidly and in partnership with his sons (and later under their directorship) the Marks practice continued to flourish until 1962 when the business was discontinued. Although St Patrick's Cathedral is one of James Marks's most notable designs, his other significant works in Toowoomba included the Royal Bank of Queensland building, the Imperial Hotel, St Stephen's Presbyterian Church and several grand private residences.

St Patrick's was a large project, which was delayed by a shortage of materials and labour as well as by the desire of Father O'Connell to open the cathedral free of debt. It took six years to complete during which time the builder, Richard Godsall, died, and the work was completed under the guidance of his firm, Godsall & Mayes. The cathedral was completed in 1889 and consecrated on 17 March of that year at a ceremony presided over by Archbishop Dunne and witnessed by some 2000 people. The original projected costing of no more than £5000 had by completion blown out to a total of £8500, much of which had been funded by the continual raising of funds amongst the local community.

The cathedral's walls and foundations were built from blue stone while the buttresses, pinnacles and piers were of freestone, which was mostly acquired from Murphy's Creek quarries. It was a dominant building within the Toowoomba townscape, measuring 38 metres (124 ft) in length, 18 metres (60 ft) in width and 17 metres (56 ft) in height. The newspaper press of the time resounded with praise for the new cathedral. The Brisbane Courier described the facade as having a "majestic and stately appearance" and the Toowoomba Chronicle reflected upon how St Patrick's was "stately yet elegant in appearance, at once handsome and massive, and by its beauty adds very much to the amenity of the town . . . . clergymen and parishioners alike may feel proud in the highest degree at the most praiseworthy and satisfactory result of their labours". Yet the cathedral was not fully complete and plans were in place for the enlargement of the chancel and the addition of an eastern and western transept. Still other items were only temporarily in position, including the chancel window, the pulpit, and an Estey organ on loan from W.H. Paling & Co.

It was not until the 1930s that the cathedral was fully completed and in the interim plans had been made by Reverend Monsignor Denis Fouhy to employ James Marks in designing a new tower for St Patrick's. While these plans did not come to fruition, Fouhy's successor, Father McKenna, was able to achieve his goal of building a new presbytery in place of the old timber one. In 1927, the architect John Donoghue designed the new brick presbytery, which was built by H Cheetham and consecrated on 12 February 1928. Also included in the building contract was the construction of a maid's quarters, a laundry, an underground tank, a brick belfry as well as some landscaping works for a total cost of £8863, funded by donations, loans from parishioners and the estate of Monsignor Fouhy.

Following the creation of the Diocese of Toowoomba in May 1929 Dr James Byrne was ordained as Bishop of the region. He immediately set about expanding St Patrick's and in 1930 the architect Arthur Bligh was employed to design a tower adjoining the front facade to the east with a belfry and spire as well as the construction of a mortuary chapel under the sanctuary and sacristies for the bishop, priest, sisters and altar boys. The total cost was to be £25,000 and the final result was to be a cathedral in cruciform measuring 61 metres (200 ft) long by 30 metres (100 ft) wide with a capacity to seat some 2000 people. The 1930s were difficult times marked by a severe economic depression and a decline in agricultural prices. Nevertheless, Toowoomba parishioners rallied to the cause and, by April 1932, £5000 had been collected. By that time, the first sod had been turned and the foundation stone laid on 24 April 1932. Work on the cathedral's extensions then began in earnest under the direction of local builder, John O'Connell, who had earlier supervised the construction of St Joseph's Church in Dalby. On 24 March 1935, Archbishop James Duhig officially opened and blessed the new cathedral in aceremony attended by 7000 people.

Although the cathedral benefited during this period from the generous donations of parishioners and local societies, which included furnishings, a new pipe organ and a new bell, the grand building works had left a debt of £8500 by December 1937. Although the parish debt had not been released by the early 1970s, the then Bishop, William Brennan, commissioned W A Durack of the architectural firm Durack & Brammer to carry out a report on the cathedral's condition. Restoration was deemed necessary, including the replacement of the roof and guttering, sealing and re-pointing the outer walls, replastering the internal walls and various cosmetic works. J H Wagner & Sons were the main contractors for the job, which was started in May 1972 and scheduled for completion in February 1973. Father Patrick Doyle, as Administrator of St Patrick's Cathedral, was charged with facilitating the renovations, which included the removal of a polished timber choir gallery located below the main tracery window on the front facade and the separation of the marble altar from its reredos for repositioning in response to liturgical changes sanctioned by the Second Vatican Council. It was also during his time in the parish that a hall was built behind the cathedral and the St Patrick Parish Centre behind the presbytery was constructed in 1979 as a conference venue.

During the 1980s, the cathedral's stained glass was replaced and parishioners invited to purchase a commemorative window pane in honour of a deceased relative and to help defray the $100,000 cost. In 1989, to mark the centenary of the opening of St Patrick's, a new bell tower was constructed by Bill Walsh and the Toowoomba City Council donated 35 trees for the cathedral's grounds as a civic gift.

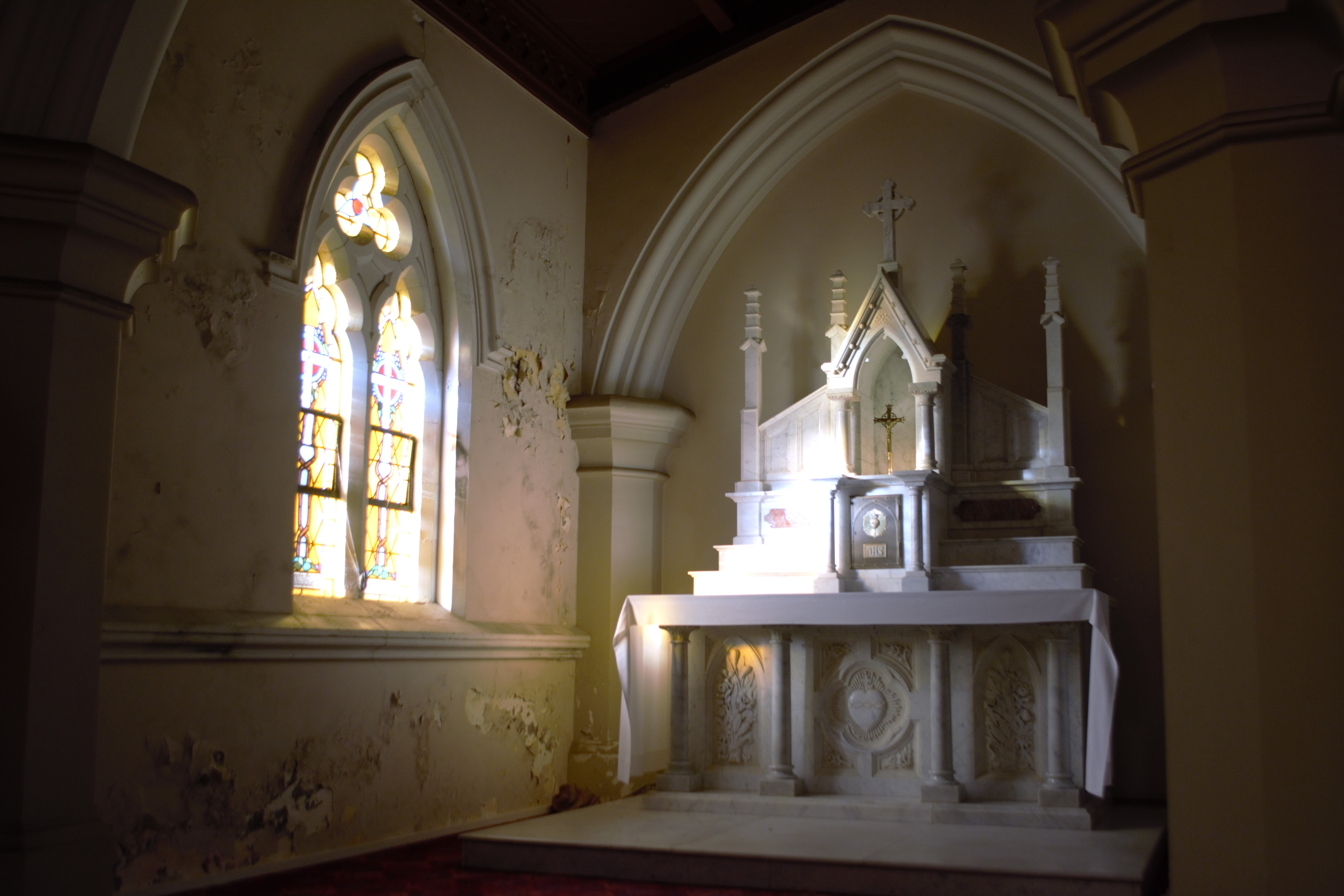
Damage to the plaster can be clearly seen on the wall next to the Sacred Heart altar

Restoration work was carried out to the presbytery in 1991, and eight years later a new storage shed was constructed and alterations made to the Parish Centre. In 2001, a major conservation plan for St Patrick's was published for the Diocese of Toowoomba and the following year work began on stabilizing the leadlight windows.

In September 2024 work began to remove the "sealant" that was placed on the exterior of the cathedral during the 1980s. A public statement noted that "The initial removal of coating should be complete by the end of October, however this will be followed by extensive repointing work and maintenance to the roof and guttering, completed with roof painting and the reintroduction of 6 dormers..." [citation required: https://www.stpats.org.au/uploads/1/2/2/7/122702580/29_september_2024.pdf]

== Description ==
St Patrick's Cathedral is located on the corner of James and Neil Streets in Toowoomba, less than 500 metres (1,600 ft) to the south of the city centre. The substantial stone building has a strong presence on James St, which carries the Warrego Highway's traffic through the city. When approaching from the west, the long ridge of its main roof and the stone of its gabled front facade become visible from a distance of approximately 500 metres (1,600 ft). The cathedral is a fine example of the Victorian Gothic architectural style, the distinguishing elements of which include steeply pitched roofs, buttresses, pinnacles, tracery and pointed arches. Also included in the Queensland Heritage Register's entry is the presbytery, with walls of face brick and a tiled roof, which is sited on the eastern side of the cathedral building.

St Patrick's is cruciform in plan, and almost 61 metres (200 ft) long and 31 metres (102 ft) wide. The main gabled roof contains the nave and features a stone cross at its apex of the front gable parapet. It intersects with the gabled roofs over each transept. All are steeply pitched. To the south, there is a further high roof, which becomes a faceted half-dome over the sanctuary and apse. All roofs are currently clad in metal sheeting, which resembles what was originally installed. The current roof cladding was put in place during the renovations conducted in 1972. The original cladding was "rolled and pan" galvanised iron in short 1,800 millimetres (71 in) lengths. The cathedral's 2001 Conservation Plan recommends that, when it is necessary to replace the building's roofing, the effort be made to return to the original, and also to reinstate the distinctive roof vents that were not incorporated in 1972.

The cathedral's stonework is "hammer dressed square rubble". The pointing of whitish mortar was originally flush with the stone, however some areas were raised to form a large bead during the 1972 renovations. The dressings to the openings, buttresses, pinnacles, piers and quoins are sandstone from Murphys Creek.

The aisles are flanked by a series of buttresses, with two short, tall ones on the front facade to James Street. These are terminated in octagonal pinnacles, while the design of the shorter two to the front ends of the aisles match the pinnacles on the entry gate's twin stone columns. Over the front doorway on the northern gable is located a large leadlight window with three lights and bar tracery head. Above this is a very small multifoil, circular window with leadlight. The leadlight windows to the aisles are divided in two by a central mullion with plate tracery and pointed arch above. Those in the upper-level walls of the nave consist of a set of three lancet windows with label mould above. The leadlight windows in each transept gable are similar to the main one on the northern gable facing James Street, however the bar tracery is of a simpler pattern. The five apse windows in the facets of the south-facing drum are divided in two by a central mullion with plate tracery above.

The 1927 presbytery is located within ten metres of the cathedral's east transept. Its main gable roof, the west end of which is half-hipped, has two large gables projecting from it on the north facade. Under one of these, a smaller gable projects over a faceted, chamferboard-clad bay window. There are both timber-framed casement and double-hung sash windows on this facade. The glass is leadlight and the gable ends are timber battened. A brick chimneystack protrudes through the roof at the western end of the building. One large, timber battened gable end projects off the main roof at the east end of the southern facade. At the west end of this facade the roof is hipped. The gable end projecting east is clad in chamferboards. A space only 4 metres (13 ft) wide at its narrowest separates the presbytery from a recently constructed brick Parish Centre to the south. Inside, a large room on the northern facade has a coffered plasterwork ceiling. It opens onto a smaller room in the north-west corner through a polished timber-framed opening with relief pillars and two narrow Doric-style columns on either side. This room has a polished timber mantelpiece and fireplace.

=== Interior of the cathedral ===
Entry to St Patrick's Cathedral can be gained from a number of points around the building, including on the front facade, centrally through either external wall to the aisles, and through the transept gable ends. Two doors allow the priests and other church personnel entry to the vestry on the north-east corner of the building. The nave and aisles to each side are separated by a series of pointed archways supported on octagonal piers with capitals. The arches throughout are fluted. This arcade supports the wall of clerestory windows above, each of which corresponds to the location of an archway. The walls throughout are painted plaster, however the octagonal piers are exposed stone. Large parts of the cathedral's floors are carpeted, but in a number of locations polished tongue and groove boards remain exposed.

The stained timber roof to the nave is somewhere between an elongated arched-brace and hammerbeam. The ends of the arched braces connect to long curved brackets, which connect back to posts fixed against the walls. The meeting point of these two elements is connected back to the wall with a carved hammerbeam and bows out into the ceiling space. The columns or brackets fixed to the wall bear on a small extrusion of stone. At the apex of the roof, where the principal rafters meets, a carved drop-finial is fitted. Above the single tie beam the rafters have scalloped edges. The roofs to the aisles feature a principal rafter supported by an arched brace fixed to columns against the walls. At the Crossing's roof, two perpendicular arched-brace sets intersect. In each transept's roof a single arched-brace set features. The lining to all these ceilings, formed by a diagonal pattern of timber tongue and groove boards, is fixed behind a series of butt purlins. Above the sanctuary and apse the ceiling is arched and plastered. The multi-angular apse's facets are picked out with relief lines of plastered stonework that extend to the floor.

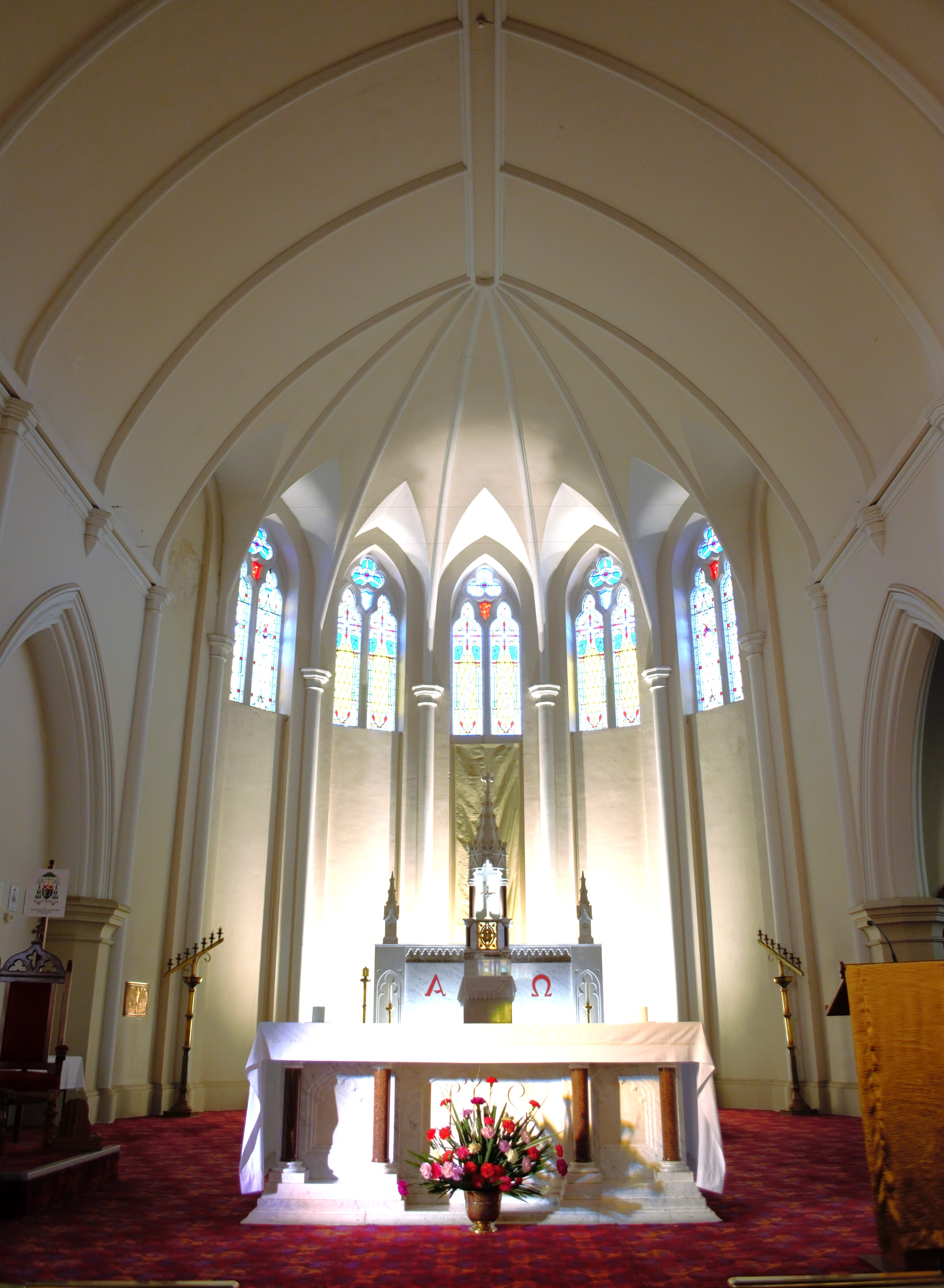
High Altar and Sanctuary

The organ is currently situated in a corner of the west transept. It and a gallery surround the entry door. They did occupy the sanctuary before the 1972 renovations. From the cathedral's original fitting-out a great number of pine and cedar polished pews and book rails remain to line two sides of the nave and the transepts. A series of steps and a marble altar rail divides the Crossing from the sanctuary, and a marble pulpit stands in the south-west corner of the crossing. Both of these were donated and installed in during the donations made in the 1930s. The five windows over the apse were donated at this time by Downlands College and depict Sacred Heart lancets. Small chapels with marble altars and rails flank the chancel (the Sacred Heart and Lady Chapels). The leadlight windows, altar rail and pulpit are the strongest Gothic design elements on the interior of the cathedral, aside from the overall shape and proportion of the spaces.

=== Grounds ===
The site fence to Neil and James Streets consists of sandstone piers and low walls, in-filled with iron railings. It was constructed in 1931. An entry gate and stairs align to the cathedral's front door on James Street. A large open space at the corner of Neil and James Streets is formed by the eastern extent of the cathedral and the north facade of the presbytery. Before 1928, this area of lawn was occupied by a two-storey timber presbytery and a number of mature trees, which were demolished and removed. A smaller area of lawn separates the cathedral from the western site boundary it shares with a school. A line of well established pines provide a useful screen here. In the south-western corner of this space is situated the steel belfry and its bell.

To the south of the cathedral and presbytery are located a large parking area and storage shed, a preschool, St Patrick's Hall and the Parish Centre. These are recent additions to the site and are not considered to be of heritage significance.

== Heritage listing ==
St Patrick's Cathedral was listed on the Queensland Heritage Register on 21 October 1992 having satisfied the following criteria.

The place is important in demonstrating the evolution or pattern of Queensland's history.

St Patrick's Cathedral was built between 1883 and 1889 and represents the ecclesiastical development of the Toowoomba area at this time. St Patrick's was originally a modest timber church but following its destruction in 1883 by fire, work began on St Patrick's Cathedral. The building of the cathedral was an indication of the emerging importance and institutional presence of the Roman Catholic Church in the Darling Downs region, and the development of St Patrick's following the creation of the Diocese of Toowoomba in 1929 reaffirmed the permanency and strength of Catholicism in the region.

The place is important because of its aesthetic significance.

St Patrick's is also important because of its aesthetic significance. It remains a fine example of Victorian Gothic architecture and reflects the continued growth of Toowoomba as well as the Catholic Church between the 1880s and 1930s. The cathedral stands as one of the most recognizable and most substantial stone buildings in Toowoomba and as such it continues to be a landmark within the Toowoomba townscape.

The place is important in demonstrating a high degree of creative or technical achievement at a particular period.

The cathedral is constructed from basalt, which was obtained from the local Corporation Quarry and which was commonly used for kerbing and channelling. It was less frequently used for buildings owing to the difficulties in applying it to construction. As such St Patrick's is a rare example of a basalt building and demonstrates a high degree of technical achievement for the late 19th century.

The place has a strong or special association with a particular community or cultural group for social, cultural or spiritual reasons.

Since its consecration, St Patrick's Cathedral has served as the symbolic and spiritual centre of Catholicism in the Toowoomba region. Its buildings and grounds have a special association with the life and work of the clergy who served at St Patrick's as well as with the Catholic community who contributed greatly to its development.

The place has a special association with the life or work of a particular person, group or organisation of importance in Queensland's history.

It also has a special association with its designer, James Marks, whose prolific experience as an architect in Toowoomba saw him dominate local architecture during the late 19th century.
