= Catholic Church sexual abuse cases in Australia =

Catholic sexual abuse cases in Australia, like Catholic Church sexual abuse cases elsewhere, have involved convictions, trials and ongoing investigations into allegations of sex crimes committed by Catholic priests, members of religious orders and other personnel which have come to light in recent decades, along with the growing awareness of sexual abuse within other religious and secular institutions.

== Overview ==
Criticisms of the church have centred both on the nature and extent of abuse, and on historical and contemporary management of allegations by church officials. Internally, the church began updating its protocols in the 1990s, and papal apologies for abuse in Australia were made by Pope John Paul II and Pope Benedict XVI. A number of government enquiries have also examined church practices—most notably the 2015–17 Royal Commission into Institutional Responses to Child Sexual Abuse. The royal commission established that some 4,444 claimants alleged incidents of child sexual abuse in 4,756 reported claims to Catholic Church authorities (some claimants made a claim of child sexual abuse against more than one Catholic Church authority) and at least 1,880 suspected abusers from 1980 to 2015. Most of those suspected of abuse were Catholic priests and religious brothers and 62% of the survivors who told the commission they were abused in religious institutions were abused in a Catholic facility.

Australia's Catholic leaders had been among the first in the world to publicly address management of child abuse: In 1996, the church issued a document, Towards Healing, which it described as seeking to "establish a compassionate and just system for dealing with complaints of abuse". Inquiries have since established that historically, church officials had often failed to prevent future abuse by clergy who had come to their attention by transferring clergy and religious to new parishes or dioceses and not stripping them of their religious status. A widely reported 2012 claim in a Victorian police report that 43 suicide deaths were directly related to abuse by clergy spurred the formation of a Victorian state Parliamentary Inquiry into the Handling of Child Abuse by Religious and other Organisations. In October 2012, the Chief Commissioner of Victoria Police, Ken Lay, in a submission to a parliamentary inquiry on the issue, recommended that some of the church's actions to hinder investigations (including dissuading victims from reporting to police, failing to engage with police and alerting suspects of allegations against them) be criminalised.

The Gillard government called a wide-ranging royal commission in 2013 to examine religious and non-religious institutions and their responses to child abuse allegations. Archbishop Denis Hart, president of the Australian Catholic Bishops Conference, said he welcomed the royal commission, as did the Archbishop of Sydney, Cardinal George Pell, who said that he hoped it would help victims and stop a "smear campaign" against the church. Pell was himself later convicted of child sex offences, but was acquitted by the High Court of Australia on 7 April 2020.

The Bishops Conference established a national coordinating body, called the Truth, Justice and Healing Council, to oversee the church's engagement with the royal commission and the pastoral and other ramifications that arose from the sexual abuse scandal.

Of the 201 Catholic Church authorities surveyed by the royal commission, 92 (46%) reported having received at least one claim of child sexual abuse. Overall, some 4,444 claimants alleged incidents of abuse in 4,756 reported claims over the period 1950–2015 (86% of claims related to pre-1990 incidents). The 3,057 claims resulting in a payment for redress amounted to $268 million between 1980 and 2015. Alleged perpetrators were overwhelmingly male (90%) and religious brothers were disproportionally highly responsible (having the most claimants and some 37% of all alleged perpetrators, despite being numerically inferior to priests and religious sisters). By means of a weighted index, the commission found that at 75 archdioceses/dioceses and religious institutes with priest members examined, some 7% of priests (who worked in Australia between 1950 and 2009) were alleged perpetrators (this finding did not represent allegations tested in a court of law). Senior Counsel Gail Furness told the commission that "Children were ignored or worse, punished. Allegations were not investigated. Priests and religious leaders were moved. The parishes or communities to which they were moved knew nothing of their past. Documents were not kept or they were destroyed." By August 2011, according to Broken Rites, a support and advocacy group for church-related sex abuse victims, there had been over 100 cases in Australia where Catholic priests had been charged for sex offences against minors, as well as others involving non-custodial sentences and inconclusive proceedings.

On 3 June 2019, 18 months after being ordered to do so by the country's Royal Commission into Institutional Child Sexual Abuse, the Australian Catholic Church published its National Catholic Safeguarding Standards. The standards closely parallel the commission's recommendations as well as norms enshrined by the government in the National Principles for Child Safe Organizations, although some provisions were watered down. One notable alteration concerned the number of hours per year that people should be undergoing professional and pastoral supervision, which was reduced from the recommended 12 hours to six hours.

On 7 May 2020, newly released portions of the Royal Commission into Institutional Child Sexual Abuse's report stated that Pell knew about sex abuse in the church as early as 1973. On 8 May 2020, the Supreme Court of Victoria established an Institutional Liability List to administer child sex abuse lawsuits The list includes claims for damages arising from the Royal Commission into Institutional Responses to Child Sexual Abuse. The royal commission's allegations against George Pell and the Roman Catholic Diocese of Ballarat played a role in the creation of the list.

In September 2020, the Australian state of Queensland passed legislation which makes it so that religious institutions, such as the Catholic Church, and their members are no longer able to use the sanctity of confession as a defence against failing to report material information about the sexual abuse of children. Under the new Queensland law, clergy who refuse to report confessions of sex abuse will face a maximum sentence of three years in prison.

== Cases ==
=== Archdiocese of Adelaide ===
On 13 September 2011, Senator Nick Xenophon used parliamentary privilege to name an Adelaide priest as the alleged perpetrator of six sexual assaults on John Hepworth about 50 years earlier. Senator Xenophon alleged that the vicar-general of the Adelaide archdiocese, Monsignor David Cappo, had been provided with detailed allegations in 2008 but had failed to act upon them, the investigations still being "at a preliminary stage" and the priest concerned not being stood down during the investigation. Monsignor Cappo subsequently resigned from several governmental positions. The Catholic Church established a formal independent inquiry, conducted by Michael Abbott, QC, found that there was no substance to the allegations.

Father Albert Davis (d. 2007), a member of the Dominican order, was charged in 2006 with 17 incidents of indecent assault involving seven boys at Blackfriars Priory School between 1956 and 1960. Davis was committed to stand trial in the Adelaide District Court, but he died before proceedings were commenced.

==== Diocese of Port Pirie ====
The Royal Commission into Institutionalised Responses to Child Sexual Abuse revealed that Port Pirie was the third-worst diocese in the country, with 14.1% of its priests accused of abuse.

In 2007, Father Charles Barnett was arrested in Jakarta, Indonesia where he had fled in 1995, and extradited to Australia. Barnett pled guilty in 2009 to three child sex charges for events between 1977 and 1985 at Crystal Brook and Port Pirie. He was sentenced for a fourth crime occurring in 1994, and was rearrested in for other crimes after his release.

=== Archdiocese of Sydney ===
In 2007, Ross Murrin, 52, a former Sydney Catholic school teacher and Marist Brother, accused of indecently assaulting eight male Year 5 students at a Daceyville school in south-east Sydney in 1974, pleaded guilty to some of the 21 charges.

In 2016, Fr Roger Flaherty received a sentence of two years and two weeks in prison five months after pleading guilty to molesting three altar boys in the 1970s and 1980s. However, Flaherty's advanced age and poor health allowed him to be eligible for parole six months into his sentence. Former Sydney archbishop Cardinal James Freeman and auxiliary bishop Edward Kelly were accused of shielding Flaherty from prosecution when the acts of sex abuse were committed.

In 2017, Fr Denis Chrysostom Alexander was arrested in Sydney and faces an extradition to Scotland for sexual and physical abuse he reportedly committed at the former Fort Augustus Abbey in the 1970s. The Archdiocese of Sydney stripped him of his priestly faculties.

In 2018, the Archbishop of Sydney, Cardinal George Pell, was convicted of child sex offences, but was acquitted by the High Court of Australia in 2020.

In December 2021, Fr Anthony Caruana was found guilty of sexually abusing 12 students in his care between the years 1982 and 1988 when he was a dormitory manager, rugby coach and band teacher at Chevalier College. He was sentenced to 15 years' imprisonment.

In July 2023, Theo Overberg, a Jesuit priest and the then-secretary for the Jesuit Conference Asia-Pacific at the Jesuit Curia in Rome, was found guilty of indecent assault involving corporal punishment against three boys in the 1970s at Sydney's Saint Ignatius' College Riverview. In June 2024, Laurence Leonard, a Jesuit brother, was found guilty of similar offences and sentenced to nine months' imprisonment.

==== Marist Brothers ====
In February 2020, convicted Marist Brother William Wade, who served as principal of five Australian Marist Brother-run high schools, pleaded guilty to also concealing the abuse from authorities.

==== Diocese of Armidale ====
This diocese incorporates 25 parishes and 24 schools within about 90,000 km^{2} and is one of, if not the highest density locations of Catholic child sexual abuse in Australia on a per capita basis. The extraordinary and shocking story of 'Father F', later to be identified as former Armidale local, and former Catholic Priest John Joseph Farrell, was central to the ABC Television program Four Corners expose "Unholy Silence". This was first broadcast on Monday 2 July 2012 and was potentially the final trigger that led to the then prime minister, Julia Gillard, announcing the Royal Commission into Institutional Responses to Child Sexual Abuse. The reaction of Armidale locals to the program was strong and one of indignation that something should have been done sooner by the Catholic Church. Case Study 44 of the Royal Commission (Held Monday 19 to Thursday 22 September 2016) focused specifically on this case of a former Catholic priest abusing children over a 20-year period and the alleged cover-up by the church hierarchy including Father Bernard Flood, Father Richard Gleeson, Monsignor Wayne Peters (dec), Father Brian Lucas, Monsignor John Usher, Bishop Gerard Hanna (ret), Bishop Bede Heather (ret), Bishop Luc Matthys (most of whom gave evidence to the Royal Commission) and even Australia's most senior Catholic, Cardinal George Pell.

On 1 November 2019, former Diocese of Armidale priest David Perrett pleaded not guilty to 139 charges of child sexual assault at a number of locations, including Armidale, Guyra, Walgett, Moree, Penrith, Bundarra, Lower Creek and Sawtell between the 1960s and 1990s. Perrett, aged 82, had been arrested for these charges and was denied bail in August 2018, but was later granted bail in April 2019 after he was told he had only six months to a year to live. In February 2020, it was ruled that Perrett would stand trial starting 18 January 2021. However, Perrett died while awaiting trial.

==== Diocese of Maitland-Newcastle ====
The diocese has been referred to as the "epicentre of Catholic clerical sexual abuse in Australia" due to a number of paedophile priests with extensive abuse records being jailed since 1997, a dedicated clergy abuse police strikeforce (Strike Force Lantle) having laid more than 170 abuse charges. Convicted abusers include Father Vincent Ryan (a $6 million compensation payout to victims, setting a record for the Catholic Church in Australia), Father David O'Hearn (serving a 23-year sentence) and Father James Fletcher (died in jail in 2006).

John Sidney Denham pleaded guilty to 29 child sex charges involving 27 boys under his care while a priest in Newcastle in the 1970s. On 27 July 2012, John Pirona was found dead in his car five days after leaving a letter ending "too much pain", this referring to his abuse by a paedophile priest in 1979 when Pirona was 12, the event occurring a year after Maitland-Newcastle bishop Leo Clarke was informed that the priest was a sex offender.

On 31 July 2012, NSW Police in Strike Force Lantle announced they would be providing prosecutors with evidence that Father Brian Lucas, general secretary of the Australian Catholic Bishops Conference, Archbishop Wilson of Adelaide and Michael Malone, retired Bishop of Maitland-Newcastle, had committed the offence of concealing a serious crime under s316 of the Crimes Act 1900 (NSW) in concealing child sexual abuse by the priest Denis McAlinden (now deceased) in the Maitland-Newcastle diocese. The evidence includes an admission by then Maitland-Newcastle bishop, Leo Clarke, to McAlinden that "your good name will be protected by the confidential nature of the process" despite "your admission to Father Brian Lucas and other evidence" and a letter from the late Maitland-Newcastle monsignor Patrick Cotter to Bishop Clarke that McAlinden "feels no such inclination towards mature females but towards the little ones. I have never heard of this condition before and knowing Father McAlinden as we do, we do not think it can be real serious." In November 2012 the Premier of New South Wales, Barry O'Farrell, ordered a special commission of inquiry into allegations of sexual abuse by Catholic clergy in this diocese and whether the church had hindered police investigations. Presided over by Margaret Cunneen SC, she reported her findings to the Governor of New South Wales, Marie Bashir, on 30 May 2014. On 22 May 2018, the Newcastle Local Court found Wilson guilty of the charge of failing to report allegations of child sexual abuse by Fletcher in 1976. Wilson was given a maximum sentence of 12 months in detention for concealing child sexual abuse in the 1970s. On 6 December 2018, Wilson was acquitted of all the charges of which he had previously been found guilty.

On 15 February 2017 it was reported that the Catholic Church in Australia had secretly paid the equivalent of $276.1 million in compensation to thousands of people sexually abused as children by priests and religious brothers. Between 1980 and 2015, the Christian Brothers, which operated a number of residential facilities, made the highest number of payments at 763, totaling $48.5 million. Most reported incidents of sex abuse occurred between 1950 and 1989. Some reported incidents occurred as early as the 1920s and the latest after 2010. On March 17, 2020, it was revealed that a 76-year-old priest was charged with three counts of indecent assault which reportedly occurred between 1979 and 1980. On 6 March 2018, it was reported that Lake Macquarie Strike Force Georgiana detectives charged Maitland-Newcastle priest David O'Hearn, who was previously convicted of 44 sex abuse offences against six boys in August 2016, with nine new counts of aggravated indecent assault.

In May 2019, Father Vincent Ryan, who had previously served 14 years in jail for sex abusing for abusing 34 boys from 1973 to 1991, was jailed for at least 14 months for sex abuse he committed against two altar boys during this timeframe which were not prosecuted. In October 2020, it was revealed that while two nuns reported claims of abuse against Ryan while he served at St Josephs Primary School, nobody made an effort to report these claims to the police. In March 2020, the Diocese of Maitland-Newcastle responded to the imminent release of the TV series Revelation by issuing an open letter detailing matters such as a timeline of Ryan's offending, Bishop Leo Clarke's failure to respond to Ryan's abuse, the treatment of the abuse victim Andrew Nash's family and Father William Burston. The report concluded that Vincent Ryan was "properly convicted" and that Andrew Nash "tragically committed suicide" after he was "abused by the criminal William Cable 'Br. Romuald.'" The Diocese agreed to remove Leo Clarke's honorary plaque from the Maitland Cathedral and it was also claimed that the Congregation of the Doctrine of the Faith would recommend to Pope Francis that Ryan be laicised

===== Marist Brothers =====
In October 2020, Royal Commission into Institutional Responses to Child Sexual Abuse revealed previously undisclosed details regarding reports of sex abuse against the Marist Brothers chapter in Newcastle and Lower Hunter. One notable case involved former Marist Brothers Hamilton student Andrew Nash, who committed suicide at the age of 13 in 1974 in what his mother believed was a result of trauma from sexual abuse. Though William Wade, also known as Brother Wade, pled guilty to concealing the reports of abuse, the accused perpetrator was another Marist Brother teacher at the school named Francis Cable, also known as Brother Cable, Brother Romuald, and Brother Dominic. In September 2020, Wade, now 84 years old, pled guilty to concealing this and received a sentence of four months community service. Wade also was convicted in 2017 for sexually abusing a boy at Hamilton in 1976 as well

In October 2020, it was acknowledged that at least one former teacher at Marist College Ashgrove, located in Queensland's capital of Brisbane, had sexually abused students.

==== Diocese of Wagga Wagga ====
In 2002, Vincent Kieran Kiss, 70, pleaded guilty in the Sydney District Court for sex crimes against four teenage boys, aged 13 to 17, between 1966 and 1973 at locations including Albury, Yass and Sydney. Kiss was the Diocesan Director of Youth in Wagga Wagga at the time of the offences and the four victims were members of the Young Christian Students Association.

==== Diocese of Wollongong ====
In 1993, the Illawarra Mercury alleged that Gwynneville parish priest Father Peter Lewis Comensoli and Brother Michael Evans had been involved in the sexual abuse of boys. Comensoli was jailed and was later named during the Wood Royal Commission. Evans committed suicide.

In 1996 Father John Gerard Nestor was charged with the 1991 indecent assault of a 15-year-old altar boy. Nestor was initially convicted by a Local Court magistrate and sentenced to a 16-month jail term which was overturned on an "all points" appeal to the District Court. The case ended suddenly when prosecution witnesses were caught in contradictions, Judge Phelen stating that the supposed victim seemed to have difficulty "distinguishing fact from imagination". Nestor went on to work as a priest for a number of years in senior appointments. After engaging in secular employment he was laicised in 2009. The former Australian prime minister and leader of the Australian Liberal Party, Tony Abbott, provided a character reference for Nestor's trial describing him as "an upright and virtuous man whom he had known since 1984 while studying at Sydney's St Patrick's Seminary to become a priest". The Illawarra Mercury reported lawyer Chris Murphy suggesting that the Royal Commission into Institutional Responses to Child Sexual Abuse investigate the case of Nestor.

In 2010, Kelvin Gerald Sharkey, 83, was sentenced in the Wollongong District Court to at least 15 months' jail for sexually abusing an altar boy on three occasions between 1969 and 1975 when Sharkey was parish priest of St John Vianney's Church at Fairy Meadow and at St Bernard's Church at Batemans Bay.

In 2017, Marist Brother and former principal of the Mary Immaculate Catholic Parish Primary School in the Sydney suburb of Eagle Vale, pleaded guilty to four counts of sexually abusing a minor.

In 2018, Bishop Peter Ingham issued an apology and acknowledged the history of sex abuse at various Catholic schools in the Diocese of Wollongong.

In March 2019, Father Ron Peters, who was formerly listed as the "Dean and Administrator" of the Diocese of Wollongong, was charged with sex abuse.

==== Diocese of Bathurst ====
St Stanislaus College Bathurst in the 1970s and 1980s was referred to by an anonymous former student as a "pedophile paradise" due to the abusive activities of priests there. William Stanley Irwin, 55, for instance, a former Catholic brother, was convicted on 31 March 2011 by a jury in the Sydney District Court on two counts of gross indecency on a male under the age of 18 at St Stanislaus' College in Bathurst in the mid-1980s. Having been asked by the boy's parents to counsel him in relation to prior sexual abuse, Irwin kissed the youth and initiated mutual masturbation when the pair stayed at the boarding school overnight during a road trip in 1986. Irwin was later a dormitory master at St Stanislaus' for two years and a chaplain and teacher at St Aloysius' College at Milsons Point.

Kevin Francis Phillips, similarly, pleaded guilty in a Sydney District Court on 3 December 2010 to four counts of gross indecency with a child under the age of 18. Phillips was sentenced on 21 April 2011 to a total of 15 months' jail. On the first three counts, he was sentenced to a concurrent term of nine months starting on 21 April 2011 and expiring on 20 January 2012. On the final charge of gross indecency by a male with a male under 18 years, Phillips was sentenced to a term of nine months to start on 21 October 2011 and expiring on 20 July 2012 with a non-parole period of three months.

Brian Joseph Spillane also was convicted on 30 November 2010 on nine counts of indecent assault against three girls aged between eight and seventeen while he was based in Sydney in about 1979, a Vincentian priest at that time. During bail proceedings it was heard that Spillane faced a further 135 charges relating to alleged offences against boys at St Stanislaus' College whilst Spillaine was chaplain. These latter charges were expected to be heard in four more trials that were expected to last until late 2011. Spillaine was refused bail. After a court-ordered media blackout was lifted, in place since 2013, it was reported in 2016 that Spillane was convicted of assaults on five St Stanislaus' College students after a trial in 2013, and in 2015 he pleaded guilty to assaults on four boys at the school in the late 1980s. It was reported that during 2016 Spillane was convicted of attacks on five students between 1974 and 1990. Spillane, who is currently in custody, was sentenced in February 2017 to an additional nine years in prison, and is not eligible for parole.

Father Charles Barnett worked at St Stanislaus College between 1971 and 1977. He later pled guilty to indecent assault incidents occurring between 1977 and 1994 in the Diocese of Port Pirie.

==== Diocese of Parramatta ====
In 1992, after allegations arose that a priest had been sexually abusing some of his parishioners, a meeting was held between the accused priest and three senior members of clergy. As a result of the meeting the priest was banned from conducting Mass, but was otherwise permitted to continue serving as a priest. The priest was laicised in 2005. In 2012, allegations arose through the Four Corners television program that the priest admitted to child sexual abuse at the 1992 meeting, and that the senior clergy present chose not to report the allegations to police. Cardinal George Pell subsequently denied that the priest admitted to sexual abuse at the meeting.

In February 2010, Fr Robert MacGregor Fuller began serving a 6-to-18-month sentence months after pleading guilty to sending both a sexually lurid video broadcast of himself and sexually lurid text messages to a 13-year-old girl in the summer of 2009.

=== Archdiocese of Melbourne ===
The Chief Commissioner of Victoria Police, in a submission to a parliamentary inquiry established in April 2012, stated that Melbourne archdiocese's Melbourne Response process, under which victims may not be legally represented appeared to "be a de facto substitute for criminal justice" that was detrimental to prosecuting suspected sexual criminals. He noted that though the Melbourne Response states on its website that in the past 14 years the church has compensated 300 people as victims of sexual abuse and identified 86 offenders of whom 60 were priests, not one complainant was referred to Victoria Police. The report stated that the process of moving offenders to other positions in the church restricted capacity to bring them to account and promoted a culture of secrecy that hindered more victims speaking out. The Melbourne Response's system, the report states, has outdated process that include requiring victims to confront alleged offenders.

Notable cases have included: Michael Charles Glennon—sentenced to 22 years' jail with a non-parole period of 15 years for 23 offences against children, including rape, indecent assault, gross indecency, sexually penetrating a child under the age of 16 and sexually penetrating a child under the age of 10; David Daniel—sentenced to six years' jail with a non-parole period of four years and six months for molesting four boys, a girl and an adult male; and Wilfred James Baker—sentenced to four years in prison (parole after two years) for 16 counts of indecent assault and one of gross indecency, involving eight boys, aged 10 to 13, over a 20-year period between 1960 and 1979. Three priests, Michael Aulsebrook, Frank Klep and David Rapson, were investigated and prosecuted for sexual abuse which took place at Rupertswood College Sunbury in the 1990s. Rapson was jailed in 2013 for at least 13 years, with the possibility of parole after 10 years, for molesting eight students at a Catholic school in Melbourne between 1973 and 1990. Klep was jailed for ten-and-a-half years in 2014 after he pleaded guilty to 15 sex offences involving many boys, including siblings at the school aged between 11 and 15, between the 1970s and 1980s and will be eligible for parole six-and-a-half years into his sentence. Aulsebrook, who was convicted in a retrial, received a sentence on seven-and-a-half years in 2018 for raping a 12-year-old boy at the Salesian College boarding school in 1988 and will be eligible for parole four and half years in his sentence.

Brother Tanson was found to have sexually abused Amber Louise while she resided at a Christian Brothers orphanage in Victoria in the 1970s. Despite belonging to a different order, Tanson was allowed to visit the orphanage on a regular basis. Tanson and an associate who was a Christian Brother were accused of abusing other children at the orphanage as well, though Louise"s case was the only one which was proven.

Former Melbourne archbishop and former high ranking Roman Curia official Cardinal George Pell was sent to jail on 27 February 2019, two months after being convicted of molesting two choir boys. Judge Peter Kidd sentenced Pell on 13 March 2019 to serve six years in jail, with three years and eight months' non-parole period. In August 2019, the Victorian Court of Appeal rejected Pell's appeal to have his convictions overturned. Pell then sought leave to have the matter heard in the High Court; however, he did serve all 405 days of his required prison sentence. On 7 April 2020, Pell won his appeal with the Australian High Court and was soon afterwards released from prison after serving 13 months of his six-year prison sentence. On 11 April 2020, Pell stated in an interview with Sky News journalist Andrew Bolt, which aired on Sky News Australia on 14 April 2020, that he was "ashamed" of the way the Catholic Church dealt with sex abuse cases. He maintained his innocence and suggested that the alleged victim had been "used". On 16 April 2020, the Richmond Football Club denied Pell the right to be reinstated as the club's vice-patron and ambassador.

On 27 April 2020 the Archdiocese of Melbourne issued an apology for shielding Father Gerard Mulvale, who had sexually abused a girl named Stephanie Piper on at least eight occasions between 1975 and 1979. An investigation against Mulvale later started in 1993, during which the Archdiocese of Melbourne denied his guilt. In January 1994 Stephanie committed suicide at the age of 32. However, Mulvale was eventually convicted on 3 November 1995 of sexually abusing two boys. Stephanie's mother Eileen Piper has along been engaged in legal action against the Archdiocese of Melbourne as well.

On 6 May 2020 it was revealed that previously undisclosed portions of the Royal Commission into Institutional Responses to Child Sexual Abuse report found Pell had shielded former Archdiocese of Melbourne priest Peter Searson from potential prosecution after the Catholic Church in Australia secretly concluded that he sexually abused children. It had been previously revealed in 2014 that the Catholic Church in Australia concluded in 1997 that Searson sexually abused both boys and girls when he was teaching at Holy Family Parish Primary School in Doveton in Melbourne's south-east. However, the results of the Catholic Church's investigation were not released to the public and Searson died in 2009 before he could face a criminal trial. In 2014, Helen Last, the former director of the Archdiocese of Melbourne's pastoral response office, claimed that in 1997, Pell blocked her from doing more to investigate the claims against Searson, telling her in letter that it was "under control" and "there remains no need for any pro-active measures from your office" and then removed her from her post one month later after she defied his order. The newly disclosed details, which were made public on 7 May 2020, also revealed that while he was serving as an auxiliary bishop of Melbourne, Pell knew that Searson not only sexually abused students at his school, but, as early as 1989, also ignored complaints that showed signs of Searson's aggressive behavior, such as his use of children's toilets and making his students watch him torture animals.

The newly disclosed portions of the Royal Commission into Institutional Responses to Child Sexual Abuse report, which was originally published in redacted form in December 2017, also revealed that priests and clergy staff accused of abusing children within the Archdiocese of Melbourne were sometimes "dealt with" by being transferred to other parishes.

==== Diocese of Ballarat ====
The Royal Commission into Institutional Responses to Child Sexual Abuse final report published on 15 December 2017 found that 139 people made a claim of child sexual abuse to the Diocese of Ballarat between 1980 and 2015 and that there was 21 alleged perpetrators identified in claims. Of the 21 alleged and convicted perpetrators 17 were priests which is 8.7% of the priests who ministered during this period.

The royal commission's final report of Catholic Church authorities in Ballarat was released on 6 December 2017. The commission found that Bishop Ronald Mulkearns had failed to take action, saying that "Bishop Mulkearns again was derelict in his duty in failing to take any effective action to have (infamous paedophile Gerald) Ridsdale referred to police and to restrict Ridsdale's contact with children." The commission pointed out to the structure of the diocese, culture and governance, concluding that "The most likely explanation for the conduct of Bishop Mulkearns and other senior clergy in the Diocese was that they were trying to minimise the risk of scandal and protect the reputation of the Catholic Church." The Melbourne report found that Peter Connors, a former Bishop of Ballarat, was part of a culture that practiced "using oblique or euphemistic language in correspondence and records concerning complaints of child sexual abuse".

Below are some extracts from the conclusion of the Royal Commission into Institutional Responses to Child Sexual Abuse's report into Case Study 28—Catholic Church authorities in Ballarat:

This case study exposed a catastrophic failure in the leadership of the Diocese and ultimately in the structure and culture of the Church over decades to effectively respond to the sexual abuse of children by its priests. That failure led to the suffering and often irreparable harm to children, their families and the wider community. That harm could have been avoided if the Church had acted in the interests of children rather than in its own interests.

Euphemistic and elliptical language was often used in correspondence and minutes to mask the true nature of the conduct discussed. There was repeated reference to 'pressures', 'strains' and unspecified 'problems'. On occasions, records were deliberately not made or kept or were destroyed.

The result of these inexcusable failures was that more children were sexually abused by Catholic clergy in the Diocese. There was a catastrophic institutional failure which resulted in many children being sexually abused. We heard about the devastating, often lifelong, consequences in the lives of those children. The welfare of children was not the primary concern of Bishop Mulkearns and other senior members of the Diocese when responding to complaints and allegation of child sexual abuse against their priests. There is no doubt it should have been.

The report on Ballarat also described the impact it had on victims. One section outlines suicide and premature death caused from the abuse. One victim said

Newspapers don't report suicides, so the public doesn't hear about the broken families and their shattered lives, about the unseen impact of institutional child sexual abuse. Children are left behind and they don't understand why. It doesn't end when the abuse ends.

Other harms are outlined. Another victim outlines the general harm in the Ballarat community:

Such chronic sexual abuse in the Ballarat community has led to a large number of men who are not able to be productive members of society and in neglect have become either emotional, social or financial burdens upon the community.

One victim who told their story to the Royal Commission was Paul Levey was sent to live with Ridsdale at the age of 14 at the presbytery in Mortlake. The Levey said he was "sexually abused all the time just about every day" and the Commission heard evidence that Ronald Mulkearns was among a number of clergy who knew Ridsdale had a boy living with him, but failed to intervene. The commission found that Mulkearns "ignored" pleas from Paul Levey's mother who was "concerned about the situation and sought his assistance" even though "By this time, Bishop Mulkearns knew of Ridsdale's admission of offending against boys." The Commission stated that Bishop Mulkearns' response to Paul Levey living with Ridsdale in the Mortlake presbytery "demonstrated a total absence of concern for the welfare of that boy". The Royal Commission into Institutional Responses to Child Sexual Abuse found that the then Bishop of Ballarat Diocese, James O'Collins, had received a complaint in the 1960s that Father Gerald Ridsdale had sexually abused a boy but did not take action. The royal commission was also told Bishop Ronald Mulkearns knew in 1975 that Ridsdale had abused boys and again did nothing to stop the abuse from occurring.

A priest, Gerald Ridsdale, was jailed in 1994 for 18 years, with a minimum of 15 years, after pleading guilty to 46 counts of child sexual offences, including buggery, indecent assault and gross indecency, committed over two decades on 21 victims. In 2006, he pleaded guilty to 35 additional charges relating to indecent assault against 10 boys. On these charges, he was sentenced to 13 years' imprisonment, with a minimum of seven years. A few of his victims criticised the sentence. Ridsdale would have been eligible for parole in August 2013, at the age of 79. On 20 June 2013, Ridsdale was again charged by Victoria Police with an additional 84 offences against 14 victims committed between 1961 and 1981. He pleaded guilty to 29 counts (27 of indecent assault, one count of buggery and one count of carnal knowledge of a girl under the age of 16) committed between 1960 and 1980 and asked for a further 27 counts to be taken into consideration at sentencing, which will take place at a date to be fixed. After pleading guilty to the above charges, including raping and abusing children as young as four, Ridsdale was sentenced to eight years in prison in April 2014 and was scheduled to be eligible for parole in April 2019. The latest charges bring the tally of Ridsdale's confirmed victims to 54. In May 2015 Ridsdale gave an account of his offending in evidence to the Royal Commission on Institutional Responses to Child Sexual Abuse. However, his ineligibility for parole was eventually extended.

Ridsdale pleaded guilty to a further 20 offences against 10 boys and a girl on 13 April 2017. These offences were committed between 1961 and 1988 in western Victoria and were expected to extend his release date further into the future. On 15 August 2017 Ridsdale pleaded guilty to 23 charges including two counts of rape and one of buggery, for abusing 12 children, 11 boys and one girl with ages ranging from 6 to 13, between 1962 and 1988 in the Victoria state city of Ballarat and the surrounding area. On 14 May 2020 Victorian County Court Judge Gerard Mullaly extended Ridsdale's non-parole period, which was originally scheduled to end in 2022, by another two years to 2024.

On 8 August 2011, Robert Charles Best, a Christian Brother, was sentenced in the Victorian County Court to 14 years and nine months' jail, with a non-parole period of 11 years and three months, for 27 offences involving sexual abuse of 11 boys. Best taught at Catholic primary and secondary schools in Ballarat, Box Hill and Geelong (all in Victoria, Australia) between the 1960s and 1980s. Best has been convicted by a jury and has pleaded guilty to more than 40 child sex offences against dozens of students, some as young as eight years old. As of 2011 Best had not been expelled by the Christian Brothers and the order had expended more than A$1 million on his legal costs. In May 2013, the Christian Brothers admitted to Victoria's parliamentary inquiry into child abuse they did what they could to defend members accused of sexual assault against children. They admitted to hiring a private investigator to follow one of Best's victims. In addition to paying the aforementioned legal costs, the church also paid hundreds of thousands to defend other members also accused of rape.

On 21 August 2019, Ballarat's Bishop Paul Bird acknowledged that Pell, who had lost his appeal in the state of Victoria, had ties to this Melbourne suffragan diocese and apologised for the history of sex abuse in the diocese as well.

On 6 September 2019 the Diocese of Ballarat released a statement admitting that the high-ranking clergy in the diocese knew of sex abuse claims against Gerald Ridsdale and afterwards made efforts to shield Ridsdale from prosecution. This confession came in the wake of civil lawsuit filed against thedDiocese by one of Ridsdale's victims.

In addition to the Archdiocese of Melbourne sex abuse charges, Pell also faced numerous sex abuse charges stemming from his time in the Diocese of Ballarat. The three-episode documentary series Revelation, which aired on ABC TV on 17 March, 31 March and 2 April 2020, revealed two men, identified as Bernie and Peter Clarke, who accused Pell of sexually abusing them as boys when he served at the Catholic-run orphanage where they resided in the 1970s. The new sex abuse allegations against Pell were also investigated by Australian journalist Sarah Ferguson. Despite the fact that his sex abuse convictions related to his time in the Archdiocese of Melbourne were later overturned, Pell still faces 10 civil lawsuits, with some stemming from his time in the Diocese of Ballarat The overturning of Pell's Melbourne conviction also did not prevent the Australian Broadcasting Corporation (ABC) from releasing a statement defending the accuracy of Revelation, stating that "The ABC has—and will continue to—report accurately and without fear or favour on stories that are in the public interest, including this one." Despite the third episode being temporarily removed from online reruns, it was restored after undergoing some re-editing to update the content; all three episodes also remain available on ABC Radio's website. In his interview with Bolt, Pell stated that failures to act on the abuse, which he referred to as "cancer", still haunted him. On 13 April 2020, the Revelation allegations developed into a new sex abuse investigation against Pell.

Robert Patrick Claffey, a priest, pleaded guilty in 1998 to indecent assault of two boys aged 12 and 13 after their sister died in a road accident in 1978. In 2014, he was also charged with 16 counts of indecent assault and one count of buggery against about seven child victims between 1970 and 1992. In October, 2016, he pleaded guilty to the offences and was jailed for 18 years. On 8 May 2020, it was revealed that Claffey was still serving a prison term for the sexual abuse of 14 children between 1969 and 1992 and that at least one of his victims, Joseph Barrett, was granted a settlement of $35,000 after filing a lawsuit against the Diocese of Ballarat.

On 6 May 2020 it was revealed that the newly disclosed portions of the royal commission report found that Pell had attempted to protect Ridsdale from potential prosecution by transferring him when he was a priest of the Diocese of Ballarat. Pell had also said to the commission that he "didn't do anything about it" when a young schoolboy told him that Brother Edward Dowlan was sexually abusing him, but also tried to hide the fact that it was also in part his duty to assist in the investigation. According to the report's newly disclosed details, which were made public on 7 May 2020, by 1973 Pell was "not only conscious of child sexual abuse by clergy but that he also had considered measures of avoiding situations which might provoke gossip about it". On 7 May 2020 the portions of the royal commission report involving Pell were made public and revealed that the commission found that Pell knew about the abuse committed by Ridsdale and deliberately attempted to cover it up when he took part in the College of Consultors decision to transfer Ridsdale from the Mortlake parish in Ballarat to Sydney in 1982. The commission rejected Pell's claim that he was deceived when he cast his vote to transfer Ridsdale as "implausible".

It was also reported that Pell had attempted to bribe Ridsdale's nephew David Ridsdale, who was also sexually abused by Ridsdale, into keeping quiet. David Ridsdale testified to the Royal Commission that the attempted bribe took place when he told Pell about the sex abuse over the phone in February 1983. David stated that after he brought up the abuse "[Pell] then began to talk about my growing family and my need to take care of their needs," and that "He mentioned how I would soon have to buy a car or house for my family." David's Ridsdales's sisters, Patricia Ridsdale and Bernadette Lukaitis, also backed his account, telling the royal commission that their brother called them shortly after his conversation with Pell and said that Pell had tried to bribe him. Despite not being satisfied with how David Ridsdale interpreted Pell's offer, which was believed to be mere assistance rather than an offer of silence, the royal commission accepted that Pell "turned his mind" to Ridsdale taking his boy victims on overnight camps.

Accusations against Pell, Ridsdale and Claffey also played a major role in the Supreme Court of Victoria's decision to create the Institutional Liability List on 8 May 2020.

=== Marist Brothers ===
In June 2017, Marist Brother William Wade, who went by the names Brother Wade and Brother Christopher, was convicted of three counts of sexually abusing two boys at Hamilton Marist School in 1976 and Kogarah Marists in 1980 and served 18 months in prison. In September 2018, Marist Brother Gerard McNamara, 80, was sentenced to nine months in prison for molesting five boys who were aspiring athletes at St Paul's Catholic College, where McNamara served as principal, in Traralgon between 1970 and 1975. He also molested one of these boy 30 times. In June 2019, the Marist Brothers produced a list of 154 members who were accused of sexually abusing children in Australia between 1980 and 2015. In May 2020, McNamara began serving his second stint in prison after pleading guilty to charges of indecent assault and one count of common assault of more than 15 male students between 1970 and 1975. This time, he received a sentence of 35 months in prison, with 28 months suspended. Since his first sex abuse conviction in June 2006, which resulted in a suspended prison sentence, McNamara, who was also nicknamed "The Rat", has received three additional convictions and sentences on sex abuse charges, but was able to once again receive a suspended prison sentence following another conviction in December 2016.

=== Archdiocese of Brisbane ===
In June 2010, Brisbane priest Michael Ambrose Endicott pleaded guilty to take indecent photos of two schoolboys between 1977 and 1978 and received a one-year suspended prison sentence. In March 2019, he received an 18-month prison sentence after being convicted of making boys strip nude for photos during the 1970s and 1980s, only to have this conviction overturned the next month. In May 2017, Anthony Francis "Damian" Colbourne, an ex-member of the Capuchin Friars, pled guilty to indecently assaulting an eight-year-old girl in the presbytery and his office on four separate occasions in 1974 and received 18-month prison sentence, which became a suspended sentence after he was jail for four months.

==== Diocese of Townsville ====
Notable cases include: Neville Joseph Creen, who molested young girls while he served as a priest at Mount Isa, north-west Queensland, from 1973 to 1981. In Brisbane District Court on 12 September 2003, Creen (aged 63) was sentenced to three-and-half years' jail with a 14-month minimum after admitting to 34 indecent dealing charges involving 18 girls under the age of 13. One girl was aged just 5 when Creen abused her at a youth camp and later at the home of her grandparents. Creen pleaded guilty to a further six charges on 4 November 2004 and was sentenced to an additional two years' jail.

==== Marist College Ashgrove ====
In October 2020, the Royal Commission into Institutional Responses to Child Sexual Abuse found that the church had failed to intervene against Thomas Butler, a Marist Brother known as Brother Patrick, when students reported that he sexually abused them within the three-year period he taught at Brisbane's Marist College Ashgrove. Butler had received sex abuse complaints in between 1991 and 1993. Provincial of the Marist Brothers in Australia, Brother Peter Carroll, delivered an apology at the royal commission's public hearing.

=== Archdiocese of Perth ===
In 1920, Christian Brother Frederick Philip Carmody was sentenced to nine years jail for sexual abuse of boys at Clontarf Boys' Orphanage.

In 1995, Gerard William Dick, a self-confessed sexually abusive priest, was sentenced to three-and-a-half years' jail for 10 incidents of indecently dealing with boys aged between 8 and 10 at a Christian Brothers' orphanage in Western Australia.

David Christian was fined A$10,500 on seven charges of indecently assaulting boys at the Marist Brothers school.

In 1994, the Parliament of Western Australia was presented a petition with 30,000 signatures which demanded an inquiry into the sexual and physical assault that took place in various institutions run by the Christian Brothers including Castledare Boys' Home, Bindoon, Clontarf and Tardun.

The Christian Brothers accepted that there was strong evidence that many of the allegations were true, and made a public apology. A legal action brought by over 200 former students ran from 1993 in the New South Wales Supreme Court and was finalised in 1996 with an out of court settlement.

In 2014, retired Subiaco and Shenton Park priest Patrick Holmes was sentenced to three years' jail. He had pled guilty to six child-sex charges dating between 1969 and 1981. He later appeared in court in 2018 and again in 2019, entering a not-guilty plea in response to 16 new charges filed after an investigation by the WA Police's Child Abuse Squad.

In January 2019, retired Perth priest Allan John Mithen received a 13-month suspended prison sentence after pleading guilty to two counts of sexually abusing an Aborigine girl at a mission in 1965.

==== Diocese of Bunbury ====
The Royal Commission's report stated that there had been 29 cases reported to the Church in Bunbury and where addressed under the Towards Healing process by the Bishop of Bunbury. While Adrian Richard Van Klooster pleaded guilty to four counts of indecently dealing with children under the age of 13 and was found with child pornography on his computer, there are other cases of paedophile priests being convicted of grooming and sexually assaulting children and young teenagers. In 2018 amendments to the Civil Liability Act removed the time limits for victims of sexual abuse to seek restitution as well as importantly defining the churches responsibility to stop the loop hole exploited in the widely condemned "Ellis Defence" that said in a nutshell that priests where not employees of the church. As a result, according to the District Court of Western Australia, there have been 16 Writ of Summons issued against the Bishop of Bunbury for civil damages resulting form sexual abuse by the Catholic clergy of the diocese. The Bishop of Bunbury, Gerard Holohan, appointed in 2001, presided over the Towards Healing process limiting the average payout to the 29 victims at $25,000. This was achieved by using the tactics of delay and denial. However, it now seems with many of these victims, long dissatisfied with theses payouts made by the bishop, are taking up their rights for proper compensation through the court. The compensation paid so far for the 29 known victims amounts to less than $750,000. However, recent compensation payouts awarded by the courts to individual victims in similar cases has ranged between $1.2 to 2.4 million. This means that with legal costs the liability of the Bunbury diocese in the next year or two would conservatively be north of $10–15 million depending upon the number of cases that go to trial. If any more victims come forward this figure can only increase.

=== Diocese of Broome ===
In March 2020, Bishop Christopher Saunders voluntarily stood aside from the administration of the diocese. This was stated to be due to a review of the diocese ordered by the Vatican. He stepped down the day after the revelation that Western Australian Police had been investigating an allegation made 18 months earlier of sexual misconduct by him. In November 2020, Saunders agreed to leave the diocese for at least six months. Pope Francis accepted his resignation on 28 August 2021.

=== Archdiocese of Hobart ===
==== Marist Fathers of Tasmania ====
Notable cases include: in 2007 Gregory Ferguson was sentenced to two years' jail (eligible for parole after 12 months) for offences in 1971 against two boys aged 13 at Marist College, Burnie, Tasmania. On 13 December 2007 he was sentenced to an additional three years' jail for offences against a third boy; in 2008 a jury found former priest Roger Michael Bellemore guilty on three counts of maintaining a sexual relationship with a young person under the age of 17 years in the 1960s and 1970s while he was at the same college. By December 2018, six former priests who taught at the college had been convicted of committing acts of sexual abuse.

=== Archdiocese of Canberra and Goulburn ===
In February 2008, a teacher at Marist College Canberra, Brother John William Chute (also known as Brother Kostka) pleaded guilty in the ACT Magistrates Court to 11 charges of indecently assaulting students of the college during the 1980s. Damages for sexual abuse have also been sought by former students at Marist College Canberra. A teacher at Daramalan College in Canberra was also charged with numerous sexual assaults in 2000; however, he committed suicide shortly after he was charged. Seven further charges against Chute relating to alleged offences committed before 1985 were dropped, due to a legal limitation that charges relating to sexual indecency had to be made within a year. In June 2008, Chute was sentenced in the ACT Supreme Court to six years in jail, serving two years in prison, one year in weekend detention, and three years suspended.

=== Transfer of accused clergy to Fiji ===
On 13 July 2020, New Zealand's 1News revealed that of some of at least 1,300 clergy who were accused of committing sexually abusing children in the nation of Fiji were originally from Australia before they were transferred. One example was Australian priest Julian Fox, was later convicted and jailed in 2015 for child sex crimes. Fox was transferred to Fiji in 1999 after Australian police started an investigation against him. The Catholic Church in Fiji also had knowledge of sex abuse allegations against Fox nine years before he was charged.

== Pope Benedict's statement ==
On 19 July 2008, before a congregation of 3,400 assembled in Sydney's St Mary's Cathedral, Pope Benedict XVI lamented that child sex abuse had taken place and the pain it caused. He also condemned those responsible for it and demanded punishment for them. However, he did not state or imply that the institutional church, or any of its leaders, accepted any responsibility for what had taken place. His statement reads:

Here I would like to pause to acknowledge the shame which we have all felt as a result of the sexual abuse of minors by some clergy and religious in this country. I am deeply sorry for the pain and suffering the victims have endured and I assure them that, as their pastor, I too share in their suffering. ... Victims should receive compassion and care, and those responsible for these evils must be brought to justice. These misdeeds, which constitute so grave a betrayal of trust, deserve unequivocal condemnation. I ask all of you to support and assist your bishops, and to work together with them in combating this evil. It is an urgent priority to promote a safer and more wholesome environment, especially for young people.

On 21 July 2008, before flying out of Australia, Pope Benedict met at St Mary's Cathedral, Sydney, with two male and two female victims of sex abuse by priests. He listened to their stories and celebrated Mass with them. The Premier of New South Wales, Morris Iemma, said that "Hopefully it will be a sign of righting the wrongs of the past and of a better future and better treatment by the church of the victims and their families."

Mark Fabbro, a victim of abuse and member of the Catholic Abuse Survivors Collective, said that while he was "happy to receive the apology, we still consider it indirect and insufficient". Chris MacIsaac of the victims' rights advocacy group Broken Rites said the Pope had taken his apology further than his previous comments on the issue as he has "never put it quite so strongly before", but expressed disappointment that the Pope had not made his apology directly to sexual abuse victims. One Australian victim of sexual abuse by a Catholic priest has stated in the media: "Dealing with the church itself was a hell of a lot more traumatic than dealing with the abuse."

== See also ==
Sexual abuse cases in catholic church

- Catholic Church sex abuse cases
- Catholic Church sex abuse cases by country

Critique & consequences related topics

- Criticism of Pope John Paul II
- Debate on the causes of clerical child abuse
- Ecclesiastical response to Catholic sex abuse cases
- Instruction Concerning the Criteria for the Discernment of Vocations with Regard to Persons with Homosexual Tendencies in View of Their Admission to the Seminary and to Holy Orders
- Sex Crimes and the Vatican, BBC documentary

Investigation, prevention and victim support related topics

- Broken Rites Australia, support and advocacy group in Australia
- Pontifical Commission for the Protection of Minors
- Vos estis lux mundi, church procedure for abuse cases

Other related topics

- Child sexual abuse in Australia
- Clerical celibacy
- Pontifical secret
- Roman Catholicism in Australia
