= Royal Commission into Institutional Responses to Child Sexual Abuse =

2010s independent public inquiry in Australia

- Commissioners: Peter McClellan (Chief); Bob Atkinson; Jennifer Coate; Robert Fitzgerald; Helen Milroy; Andrew Murray
- Inquiry period: 13 January 2013 – 15 December 2017
- Constituting instrument: Royal Commissions Act 1902
- Website: childabuseroyalcommission.gov.au

The Royal Commission into Institutional Responses to Child Sexual Abuse was announced in November 2012 and established in 2013 by the Australian government pursuant to the Royal Commissions Act 1902 to inquire into and report upon responses by institutions to instances and allegations of child sexual abuse in Australia. The establishment of the Commission followed revelations of child abusers being moved from place to place instead of their crimes being reported to police. There were also revelations adults failed to try to stop further acts of child abuse. The commission examined the history of abuse in educational institutions, religious groups, sporting organisations, state institutions and youth organisations. The final report of the commission was made public on 15 December 2017.

== Background ==
During the late 1990s and early 2000s, allegations were made of child sexual abuse in the Catholic Church in Australia and in a number of other religious and non-religious institutions. Some of these allegations led to convictions, trials and ongoing investigations into acts committed by Catholic priests and members of Catholic religious orders. Some of the allegations relate to incidents alleged to have taken place during the 1950s, others later. There were calls for a Royal Commission since the late 1990s.

Similar allegations against the Roman Catholic Church had been made in the United States, in Ireland, in Canada, in Belgium, and several other European countries. In Ireland, the government's Commission to Inquire into Child Abuse was established in 2000 and presented its final report to the Dáil in 2009, covering allegations of child abuse from 1936 onwards.

A 1996 parliamentary inquiry in Western Australia attempted to review the extent of abuse, including sexual abuse, of children in state care; however it realised that the scope of the task was too big. In South Australia there were allegations that the Government of South Australia was not accurately reporting the numbers of children being sexually abused in remote parts of the state. In Queensland, during 1999 the Commission of Inquiry into Abuse of Children in Queensland Institutions (headed by Leneen Forde, a former Governor of Queensland), investigated the treatment of children in 159 licensed government and non-government institutions from 1911 to 1999. In its report, the Inquiry found that abuse had occurred and made 42 recommendations relating to contemporary child protection practices, youth justice and redress of past abuse.

In Victoria, in January 2011 the Protecting Victoria's Vulnerable Children Inquiry was launched to investigate Victoria's child protection system and make recommendations to strengthen and improve the protection and support of vulnerable young people. The inquiry was chaired by a former Supreme Court of Victoria Justice, the Hon. Philip Cummins, and reported in January 2012. The report considered the issue of the sexual and other abuse of children by personnel in religious organisations and recommended that a formal investigation should be conducted into the processes by which religious organisations respond to the criminal abuse of children by personnel in their organisation. A bi-partisan parliamentary inquiry was established in May 2012 in that state to seek information about the causes and effects of criminal abuse within religious and other non-government organisations; whether victims were discouraged from reporting such abuse; if such abuse was reported, how the reporting of their experience of abuse was handled; the consequences of abuse, including the effect on the victims and others, and the consequences for the perpetrator(s); the adequacy of the policies, procedures and practices within religious and other non-government organisations that related to the prevention of, and response to, child abuse; and suggestions for reform, to help prevent abuse and ensure that allegations of abuse are properly dealt with. During its proceedings it heard from a police report that detailed 40 suicide deaths directly related to abuse by Roman Catholic clergy. In October 2012, the chief commissioner of Victoria Police, Ken Lay, in a submission to the parliamentary inquiry, recommended that some of the Roman Catholic Church's actions to hinder investigations (including dissuading victims from reporting to police, failing to engage with police and alerting suspects of allegations against them) be criminalised.

By June 2012, there was community and academic pressure for the establishment of a royal commission, most especially in Victoria.

=== Hunter Special Commission of Inquiry ===
In July 2012, John Pirona, a victim of Father John Denham, took his own life. Pirona left a note that said "Too Much Pain". The prime minister, Julia Gillard, visited Newcastle on 8 August 2012, the day of Pirona's funeral, where mourners backed The Newcastle Herald's "Shine the Light" campaign for a royal commission.

Journalist Joanne McCarthy's report on Pirona's death and clergy abuse in the Catholic Diocese of Maitland–Newcastle was the catalyst for the "Shine the Light" campaign that would ultimately lead to the Royal Commission.

In November 2012, Peter Fox, a senior detective in the NSW Police, alleged he had been stood down from investigating child sexual abuse by Catholic clergy while he was compiling "explosive" evidence from a key witness and that "the church covers up, silences victims, hinders police investigations, alerts offenders, destroys evidence and moves priests to protect the good name of the church".

Fox went public with his allegations in November 2012, when he spoke about the "evil of paedophilia within the Catholic Church".

On 9 November 2012, Premier of New South Wales, Barry O'Farrell, announced the appointment of a Special Commission of Inquiry into allegations raised about police handling of allegations of child sexual abuse by clergy in the Diocese of Maitland-Newcastle. The Commission was headed by Margaret Cunneen. The Special Commission inquiry centred around internal church documents obtained by Newcastle Herald journalist Joanne McCarthy, that revealed a group of senior clergy allegedly attempting to conceal the crimes of Father Denis McAlinden, a prolific paedophile.

The Cunneen Inquiry found Fox was not a credible witness, prone to exaggeration and his evidence must be "approached with caution". The report also found that senior Catholic Church officials, including former Bishop Leo Clarke, withheld information from police.

On 12 November 2012, prime minister, Julia Gillard, announced she would be recommending to the governor-general the creation of a royal commission. On 19 November 2012, federal attorney-general Nicola Roxon and the acting minister for families, Brendan O'Connor, released a consultation paper seeking input into the commission's scope of the terms of reference, how the Commonwealth and the states and territories would work together, the number of commissioners and suggested areas of expertise, the proposed timetable and reporting requirements.

Archbishop Denis Hart, president of the Australian Catholic Bishops Conference, stated that he welcomed and promised co-operation with a Royal Commission to broadly investigate child sexual abuse in institutions across Australia. The Australian Bishops Conference said that "talk of a systemic problem of sexual abuse in the Catholic Church is ill-founded and inconsistent with the facts",

Cardinal George Pell stated that he hoped the Royal Commission would stop a "smear campaign" against the Catholic Church.

During a press conference on 13 November 2012, Cardinal Pell voiced his support for the Royal Commission and welcomed the opportunity to help victims and clear the air. Responding to Pell's press conference, Bishop Geoffrey Robinson described Pell as a "great embarrassment to me and to a lot of good Catholic people".

== Terms of reference ==
On 11 January 2013, Governor-General Quentin Bryce issued Commonwealth letters patent appointing six commissioners and the commission's terms of reference. The commissioners were directed "to inquire into institutional responses to allegations and incidents of child sexual abuse and related matters".

Each state was also requested to issue letters patent, or their equivalent instruments of appointment, which allow the six commissioners to conduct an inquiry into institutional responses to child sexual abuse under their respective laws. The commissioners were formally appointed under Western Australian law on 22 January 2013, Queensland law on 24 January 2013, New South Wales law on 25 January 2013, Victorian law on 12 February 2013, Tasmanian law on 4 March 2013 and South Australian law on 7 March 2013. Despite both the Australian Capital Territory and the Northern Territory having their own governments, they are officially administered under the Commonwealth of Australia, and the Commonwealth letters patent covered their jurisdiction.

== Commissioners and executive ==
Gillard announced the setting up of the royal commission and the appointment of six commissioners with Peter McClellan as its head. The six commissioners were:

- Bob Atkinson, a former Police Commissioner of Queensland who oversaw police reforms following the Fitzgerald Inquiry
- Jennifer Coate, an appointee to the Family Court of Australia, a judge of the County Court of Victoria, and a former president of Children's Court of Victoria
- Robert Fitzgerald, a commissioner on the Productivity Commission, convenor to the Indigenous Disadvantage Working Group and a former commissioner on the NSW Community and Disability Services
- Peter McClellan, a Supreme Court of New South Wales judge, a former chair of the Sydney Water Inquiry, and a former assistant commissioner at the Independent Commission Against Corruption
- Helen Milroy, a consultant psychiatrist with the WA Department of Health specialising in child and adolescent psychiatry, and director of the Western Australian Centre for Aboriginal Medical and Dental Health
- Andrew Murray, a former senator from Western Australia and advocate on issues surrounding institutionalised children

The setting up of the royal commission was established by Julia Gillard, supported by the opposition leader, Tony Abbott, and by the Greens, as were the terms of reference and the choice of commissioners.

The inaugural chief executive officer was Janette Dines, who served from January 2013 until June 2014.

== Powers ==
The powers of royal commissions in Australia are set out in the enabling legislation, the Royal Commissions Act 1902 (Cth).

The Royal Commissions Amendment Act 2013 was approved by Parliament to give the Child Abuse Royal Commission additional powers to fulfil its terms of reference. Notable changes were:

1. Enabling the chair to authorise one or more members to hold a public or private hearing
2. Authorise members of the royal commission to hold private sessions

Royal commissions, appointed pursuant to the Royal Commissions Act or otherwise, have powers to issue a summons to a person to appear before the commission at a hearing to give evidence or to produce documents specified in the summons; require witnesses to take an oath or give an affirmation; and require a person to deliver documents to the commission at a specified place and time. A person served with a summons or a notice to produce documents must comply with that requirement, or face prosecution for an offence. The penalty for conviction upon such an offence is a fine of A$1,000 or six months imprisonment. A royal commission may authorise the Australian Federal Police to execute search warrants.

== Submissions ==
The commissioners invited members of the public to make submissions, either orally over the telephone, in writing, or via face-to-face meetings with a commission officer. To help people planning to give evidence, in July 2013 the attorney-general, Mark Dreyfus, announced provision of a free national legal service, independent of the royal commission, by the National Association of Community Legal Centres. Witnesses were offered the opportunity to tell their story to the Royal Commission via either public hearings or in private.

The commissioners identified a number of themes and invited members of the public, organisations and institutions to make submissions on each of the following issues. As of September 2016 there were no issues papers open for submission. The number of public submissions is listed:

Issue		Close date of submissions	# submissions received	Reference
1	Working With Children Check	12 August 2013	79	
2	Towards Healing	4 September 2013	23	
3	Child Safe Institutions	11 October 2013	53	
4	Sexual Abuse of Children in Out-of-Home Care	8 November 2013	62	
5	Civil Litigation	17 March 2014	37	
6	Redress schemes	2 June 2014	86	
7	Statutory victims of crime compensation schemes	30 June 2014	44	
8	Experience of police and prosecution responses	15 June 2015	23	
9	Risk of child sexual abuse in schools	31 August 2015	38	
10	Advocacy and Support and Therapeutic Treatment Services	30 November 2015	120	
11	Catholic Church Final Hearing	1 July 2016	44	

Submissions were made by organisations including the Jehovah's Witnesses, the Anglican Church, Anglicare, Barnardos Australia, Bravehearts, Broken Rites, CREATE Foundation, the Law Council of Australia, the Lutheran Church, MacKillop Family Services, Mission Australia, the National Association for Prevention of Child Abuse and Neglect, SNAP Australia (Survivors Network of those Abused by Priests), the Roman Catholic Church in Australia, Save the Children Australia, Scouts Australia, The Smith Family, the St Vincent de Paul Society, Surf Life Saving Australia, the Church of Christ (Latter Day Saints), the Salvation Army, the Uniting Church and YMCA Australia. In addition there were submissions from survivors groups (such as Ballarat survivors group) and representatives of victims and survivors. The Australian Government and the governments of the ACT, NSW, Queensland, South Australia, Tasmania, Victoria and Western Australia made submissions. The list of government agencies which made submissions is extensive and includes the ACT Children & Young People Commissioner, the Australian Children's Education & Care Quality Authority, the Australian Federal Police, the Australian Human Rights Commission, the Australian Senate, the Commission for Children and Young People and Child Guardian (Queensland), the Commissioner for Children and Young People WA, the Commissioner for Victim's Rights SA, Legal Aid NSW, the Legal Services Commission of South Australia, the NSW Children's Guardian, the NSW Ombudsman, Queensland State Archives, the Secretariat of National Aboriginal and Islander Child Care (SNAICC), the Victorian Aboriginal Child Care Agency, the Victorian Commissioner for Children and Young People, and Victoria Legal Aid. Many individuals made submissions, including David Hill and John Menadue.

Through the Australian Catholic Bishops Conference, the Catholic Church established a national co-ordinating body, called the Truth, Justice and Healing Council, to oversee the church's engagement with the royal commission and the pastoral and other ramifications that arose from the sexual abuse scandal. The council was chaired by the Honourable Barry O'Keefe until his 2014 death. He was succeeded by the Honourable Neville Owen, a former judge, barrister and solicitor.

The commission detailed the number of abuse claims against 10 religious orders from 1950 to 2010; four orders had allegations of abuse against more than 20% of their members.

Percentage of church figures behind alleged abuse, 1950–2010
Religious institution	Percentage
St John of God Brothers	40.4
Christian Brothers	22
Salesians of Don Bosco	21.9
Marist Brothers	20.4
De La Salle Brothers	13.8
Patrician Brothers	12.4
Society of Jesus	4.8
Missionaries of the Sacred Heart	3.3
Sisters of St Joseph of the Sacred Heart	0.6
Sisters of Mercy (Brisbane)	0.3

== Public hearings ==
Hearings were conducted in every capital city and a number of regional centres across Australia. Because the Royal Commission felt it did not have the resources to investigate all of the thousands of allegations of abuse it was receiving, hearings were held with a focus on case studies of particular institutions. The Royal Commission's web site has an up-to-date list of case studies (49 as of 10 December 2016).

Case study		Date	Location	Summary description
1	Scouts	16–19 Sep 2013	Sydney	The response of organisations, including Scouts Australia, Hunter Aboriginal Services and the then Department of Community Services, to information and allegations concerning Steven Larkins, the former CEO of Hunter Aboriginal Children's Services.
2	YMCA	21 Oct–1 Nov 2013	Sydney	The responses of YMCA and police to allegations made in 2011 that Jonathon Lord sexually abused children in the care of YMCA.
3	North Coast Children's Home	18–27 Nov 2013	Sydney	The handling of complaints and civil litigation concerning child sexual abuse in the North Coast Children's Home by the Anglican Diocese of Grafton in 2006 and 2007.
4	Towards Healing	9–19 Dec 2013, 22–24 Jan 2014	Sydney	The establishment, operation and review of the Towards Healing process by the Catholic Church.
5	Salvation Army (NSW and QLD)	28 Jan–10 Feb 2014	Sydney	The Salvation Army's response to child sexual abuse at boys' homes in Indooroopilly, Riverview, Bexley and Goulburn.
6	Toowoomba	17–24 Feb 2014	Brisbane	The response by the Catholic Education Office, Diocese of Toowoomba, to allegations of child sexual abuse.
7	Parramatta Girls and Hay Institution	26 Feb–3 Mar 2014	Sydney	The experience of women who were sexually abused as children, between 1950-1974 while committed in The Parramatta Girls' Training School and The Institution for Girls in Hay.
8	Towards Healing	10–26 Mar 2014	Sydney	The response of the Catholic Church to the complaint made by John Ellis under Towards Healing.
9	St Ann's Special School	17–24 Mar 2014	Adelaide	The responses by the Catholic Archdiocese of Adelaide, and the South Australian Police, to allegations of child sexual abuse at St Ann's Special School.
10	Salvation Army (Eastern Territory)	27 Mar-15 Apr 2014	Sydney	The handling by The Salvation Army (Eastern Territory) of claims of child sexual abuse between 1993 and 2014.
11	Christian Brothers	28 Apr–7 May 2014	Perth	The experiences of men who were resident at Christian Brothers' residences in Western Australia.
12	Perth school	19 May–20 Jun 2014	Perth	The response of an independent school in Perth to concerns raised between 1999 and 2009 by teachers and others about another teacher.
13	Marist Brothers	10–17 Jun, 1 Jul 7 August 2014	Canberra	The response of the Marist Brothers to allegations of child sexual abuse in schools in the ACT, NSW and Queensland.
14	Diocese of Wollongong	24–27 Jun 2014	Sydney	The response of the Catholic Diocese of Wollongong to allegations of child sexual abuse against John Gerard Nestor.
15	Swimming Australia	7–16 Jul 2014	Sydney	The response of Swimming Australia Ltd to allegations of child sexual abuse.
16	Melbourne Response	18–26 Aug 2014	Melbourne	The principles, practices and procedures of the Melbourne Response.
17	Retta Dixon Home	22 Sep–1 Oct 2014	Darwin	The experiences of men and women who were sexually abused as children at the Retta Dixon Home.
18	Australian Christian Churches	7–17 Oct 2014	Sydney	The responses by Australian Christian Churches (a Pentecostal movement in Australia) and two affiliated churches to allegations of child sexual abuse.
19	Bethcar Children’s Home	18 December 2014	Sydney	The responses of the State to complaints made and litigation instituted by former residents of Bethcar Children's Home, Brewarrina, New South Wales.
20	Hutchins School	19–25 Nov, 18 Dec 2014	Hobart	The responses by the Hutchins School and the Anglican Diocese of Tasmania to allegations of child sexual abuse at the School.
21	Satyananda Yoga Ashram	2–10 Dec 2014, 29 Apr 2015	Sydney	The response of Satyananda Yoga Ashram to allegations of child sexual abuse by the Ashram's former spiritual leader in the 1970s and 1980s.
22	Yeshivah	2–13 Feb 2015	Sydney	The response of Yeshivah Melbourne and Yeshiva Bondi to allegations of child sexual abuse.
23	Knox Grammar	23 Feb – 6 Mar, 28 Apr 2015	Sydney	The response of Knox Grammar School in Wahroonga, New South Wales and the Uniting Church in Australia between 1970 and 2012 to concerns raised about inappropriate conduct by a number of teachers towards students at Knox Grammar School.
24	Out-of-home care	10–18 Mar, 29 Jun–3 Jul 2015	Sydney	Preventing child sexual abuse in out-of-home care and responding to allegations of child sexual abuse occurring in out-of-home care.
25	Redress and civil litigation	25 March 2015	Sydney	To enable invited persons and institutions to speak to their written submissions to the Royal Commission's consultation paper on redress and civil litigation.
26	St Joseph’s Orphanage	14 April 2015	Rockhampton	The experiences of a number of men and women who were resident at St Joseph's Orphanage, Neerkol operated by the Sisters of Mercy between 1940 and 1975.
27	Health Care Providers	6–13 May, 15 May 2015	Sydney	The policies and procedures of the NSW Health Care Complaints Commission, the Medical Council of NSW, the Royal North Shore Hospital, Northern Sydney Local Health District, New South Wales Ministry of Health and the Royal Children's Hospital, Victoria to allegations of child sexual abuse in private medical practices and public hospitals.
28	Catholic Church authorities in Ballarat	19–29 May 2015, 22 Feb–3 Mar 2016	Ballarat and by video link from the Vatican City	The experiences of residents, students and others subject to allegations of child sexual abuse by Catholic clergy in certain institutions in Ballarat.
29	Jehovah's Witnesses	27 Jul – 5 Aug, 14 Aug 2015	Sydney	The experience of survivors of child sexual abuse within the Jehovah's Witnesses Church and the response, systems, policies and procedures of the Jehovah's Witnesses Church and the Watchtower Bible and Tract Society of Australia.
30	Correctional centres in Victoria	17–28 Aug 2015	Melbourne	The experiences of former child residents at Turana Youth Training Centre, Winlaton Youth Training Centre and Baltara Reception Centre between the 1960s and early 1990s.
31	Towards Healing	24 Aug 2015	Sydney	The evidence of retired Bishop Geoffrey Robinson regarding the history and development of the Catholic Church's response to child sexual abuse prior to the introduction of Towards Healing.
32	Geelong Grammar School	1–11 Sep, 22–23 Oct 2015	Melbourne and Sydney	The experience of former students of Geelong Grammar School, Victoria.
33	Salvation Army (Southern Territory)	6–14 Oct 2015	Adelaide	The experience of former child residents at institutions operated by The Salvation Army (Southern Territory) between 1940 and 1990.
34	Brisbane Grammar School; St Paul's School	3–12 Nov, 20–30 Nov 2015	Brisbane, Sydney, and Melbourne	The experience of former students of Brisbane Grammar School and St Paul's School in Queensland.
35	Catholic Archdiocese of Melbourne	24 Nov–4 Dec 2015, 29 Feb – 3 Mar, 27 Apr 2016	Melbourne and by video link from the Vatican City	The response of the Catholic Archdiocese of Melbourne to allegations of child sexual abuse.
36	Anglican Dioceses of Tasmania, Adelaide, Sydney and Brisbane	27 January 2016	Hobart	The response of the Church of England Boys' Society and the Anglican Dioceses of Tasmania, Adelaide, Sydney and Brisbane to allegations of child sexual abuse.
37	Centres for performing arts	2–11 Mar 2016	Sydney	The experiences of children who received dance instruction at RG Dance Pty Ltd in Chiswick, and former students of Australian Institute of Music in Surry Hills between 2002 and 2011.
38	Criminal justice issues	15–24 Mar 2016	Sydney	The experiences of survivors of child sexual abuse in an institutional context in the criminal justice system as complainants against an accused who was the subject of allegations by more than one complainant.
39	Sporting clubs	4–13 Apr 2016	Sydney	The experiences of men and women who were sexually abused as children in sporting clubs.
40	Australian Defence Force	21–230 Jun; 26 Aug 2016	Sydney	The experiences of survivors of child sexual abuse of institutions operated by the Australian Defence Force.
41	Disability service providers	11–22 Jul 2016	Sydney	The responses of disability service providers to allegations of child sexual abuse.
42	Anglican Diocese of Newcastle	2–12 Aug; 16–24 Nov 2016	Newcastle and Sydney	The experiences of survivors of child sexual abuse perpetrated by clergy and lay people involved in or associated with the Anglican Diocese of Newcastle.
43	Catholic Diocese of Maitland-Newcastle	31 Aug – 9 Sep; 9 Dec 2016	Newcastle	The response of Catholic Church authorities in the Maitland-Newcastle region to allegations of child sexual abuse by clergy and religious.
44	John Joseph Farrell	12–22 Sep 2016	Sydney	The responses of the Catholic Diocese of Armidale and the Catholic Diocese of Parramatta to allegations of child sexual abuse made against John Joseph Farrell; and the response of the Special Issues Group for the Province of Sydney to allegations of child sexual abuse against John Joseph Farrell.
45	Problematic or harmful sexual behaviours	20 Oct–4 Nov 2016	Sydney	The responses to children with problematic or harmful sexual behaviours in schools.
46	Consultation Paper on Criminal Justice	28 Nov–2 Dec 2016	Sydney	The issues raised in the Royal Commission's Consultation Paper on Criminal Justice and the experience of a survivor of child sexual abuse in an institutional context in the criminal justice system in a recently concluded prosecution in New South Wales.
47	YMCA New South Wales	15 December 2016	Sydney	The current policies and procedures of YMCA New South Wales in relation to child-protection and child-safety standards, including responding to allegations of child sexual abuse.
48	Scouts New South Wales	6 December 2016	Sydney	The current policies and procedures of Scouts New South Wales in relation to child-protection and child-safety standards, including responding to allegations of child sexual abuse.
49	The Salvation Army	7 December 2016	Sydney	The current policies and procedures of The Salvation Army in relation to child-protection and child-safety standards, including responding to allegations of child sexual abuse.

=== Scouts Australia ===
In the Hunter region of New South Wales, it was alleged that a former member of Scouts Australia, suspended from the organisation for abusing two Scouts in the 1990s, was employed as the chief executive officer of an Aboriginal child welfare agency two months prior to the formal introduction of working-with-children checks. In testimony before the commission in September 2013, it was revealed that the applicant's suitability for the role may have been assessed by relatively junior staff; and that he later falsified his working-with-children check. It was alleged that the NSW Department of Community Services (DOCS) gave the man permission to have a 17-year-old boy, whom he was grooming for sex, live with him. A former CEO of Scouts Australia testified that during his three years in the job, he dealt with ten allegations of child sexual abuse. He admitted a number of children were sexually abused or harmed and said the Scouts failed them. The commission heard testimony from two victims who spoke of the profound effect the sexual abuse had on their lives.

The first published case study of the royal commission dealt with the response of institutions to the conduct of Steven Larkins, who occupied positions of responsibility in Scouts Australia NSW and in the Hunter Aboriginal Children's Service. Larkins was prosecuted in 2012 for offences he had committed 15 years earlier, and was convicted and imprisoned.

=== YMCA NSW ===
Between October 2013 and January 2014, the commission heard evidence that there were systemic failures by management within YMCA NSW after a worker was hired to work at a YMCA child care centre located in Caringbah in southern Sydney without the appropriate background checks. The former worker, Jonathan Luke Lord, has since been convicted of offences relating to the abuse of twelve boys in his care, some as young as six. On 18 January 2013, Lord was sentenced to 10 years and a non-parole period of 6 years. He was sentenced for 13 offences involving 12 children and another 16 offences were taken into account.

Following evidence presented before the commission, the NSW Department of Education and Communities wrote to the Chief Executive Officer of YMCA NSW and issued a compliance notice that set out strict conditions for continuation of the YMCA's childcare licence. The Chief Executive Officer of YMCA NSW testified before the commission about the impact of crimes that occurred on YMCA NSW premises.

(The perpetrator)... was an insidious and deceitful individual, who was grooming not only children and parents but the YMCA itself. He gained the trust of the children, the parents and the fellow staff members to really get close to these children. (He would) go so far as to open the childcare centre for a parent who had to start work early. (He) went above and beyond to help out parents. We've got staff who are struggling to comfort children that come to them distressed because it might be seen as grooming practices. So (his) impacts have been devastating.

— Phillip Hare, Chief Executive Officer of YMCA NSW; testimony given in 2013.

=== Towards Healing ===
Case Studies 4, 8, and 31 inquired into the Catholic Church's Towards Healing program and the Church's responses. Hearing 8 also focused on Ellis' experience in civil litigation. The program received criticism from at least one abuse victim who claimed it delayed reporting her complaint.

=== Salvation Army ===
In January 2014 the commission began investigating allegations of sexual and physical abuse of children at four boys' homes run by the Salvation Army. The homes examined by the commission were the Bexley Boys Home in Sydney, the Gill Memorial Home at Goulburn in southern New South Wales, the Alkira Salvation Army Home for Boys at Indooroopilly in Brisbane and the Riverview Training Farm at Riverview in Queensland. The commission heard testimony from two Salvation Army whistleblowers about allegations of child abuse between 1973 and 1975. The officers testified that they witnessed a boy had his arm dislocated during a beating by another Salvation Army officer. The Salvation Army banned the husband and wife whistleblowers from talking to other alleged victims of child abuse and dismissed them from their position as "house parents" at the Alkira home. When the whistleblowers complained to the Queensland Department of Children's Services, they were labelled troublemakers. The officer at the centre of the allegations had previously worked at the Bexley home from 1968; and then was the manager of the Alkira home between 1974 and 1976. The Salvation Army moved the alleged perpetrator to another Salvation Army service where he was promoted in rank. Following the allegations raised at the royal commission, the Salvation Army suspended the officer at the centre of the allegations. The officer concerned did not attended the commission's hearings but the inquiry has been told he refutes the allegations of sexual abuse. The inquiry heard that officers were moved interstate if they were accused of child sexual abuse. One officer was dismissed from the Salvation Army in 2005 due to allegations of child sexual abuse. The whistleblowers testified that boys at the home were used for alleged sexual exploitation and were allegedly subject to physical abuse.

"They were given drink and chocolates, well, they were used that day in Brisbane and the next day they were sent down to Sydney ... (Another officer) told me the boys were useless and bad, and it had to be drummed into them that rules are rules."

— Major Cliff Randall, testimony from a Salvation Army whistleblower, 2014.

Witnesses who testified included alleged victims of child abuse. A male witness told the royal commission that while at the Gill Memorial Home at Goulburn, aged 12 years, he was regularly sexually abused by a Salvation Army officer.

"... (I was abused) ... at least four out of every seven days. Many times he would drag me out of bed at 3am for allegedly making a noise, ... He would punish me by taking me down to the bathrooms and making me scrub the toilets with a toothbrush. I was always there on my own. He would then sexually abuse me and send me back to bed at 5am. I would then have to get up at 6am to start my chores ... (He) flogged me when we got back for telling lies. He hit me with his open palm on my head, chest, arms and upper body."

— A victim of alleged child abuse at the Gill Memorial Home, Goulburn; testimony given in 2014.

=== Mangrove Yoga Ashram ===
In December 2014, the Commission hearing examined allegations into the Satyananda Yoga Ashram at Mangrove Mountain, New South Wales of child sexual abuse by the ashram's former spiritual leader Swami Akhandananda Saraswati in the 1970s and 1980s. It found that Akhandananda, who was director of the ashram, had sexually abused children in his care, eleven of whom served as witnesses to the Royal Commission. In 1989 Akhandananda was sentenced to two years and four months of imprisonment; his conviction was overturned in 1991. The Ashram issued an acknowledgement and apology to the survivors of Akhandananda's sexual abuse. The apology and acknowledgement stated that the ashram accepted that the child sexual abuse did occur, and that the organisation had not responded in a way that was helpful to victims.

=== Yeshiva, Melbourne and Yeshiva, Bondi ===
Testimony by victims of sexual abuse at two Chabad schools, Yeshiva in Melbourne and Yeshiva in Bondi, and school officials was given at the Commission. Witnesses included Manny Waks and his father. Several Chabad rabbis were found to have been publicly sermonizing that it was religiously forbidden to report child sex abuse to the police. The prohibition against reporting a fellow Jew to the authorities is referred to as Mesirah As of 1 September 2015, four Chabad Rabbis had resigned in relation to the controversy. As a consequence of the revelations, one Chabad institution's Committee of Management was to be replaced and to have its Board of Trustees disbanded.

Witnesses noted that not only were victims of abuse not protected, but those who reported abuse to the rabbis were shunned as "mosers" who commit "mesirah". The schools were accused of covering up multiple claims of sexual abuse at their institutions in the 1980s and 1990s, and of retaliating against whistleblowers and victims.

Rabbi Moshe Gutnick was called to testify. He said, "I believe the cover-ups and bullying and intimidation that has gone on ... represents the antithesis of the teachings of Chabad and Judaism and orthodoxy." He acknowledged that the Orthodox Chabad community in Australia was guilty of covering up sex crimes committed in the community, and pressuring victims and their families not to report the crimes to the police. Gutnick said that people reporting abuse were ostracized mosers ("informers"). He said "a culture of cover-up, often couched in religious terms, pervaded our thinking and our actions." He said that rabbis in these situations had misused their power, and that anyone who insists a child sexual abuse victim should go first to a rabbi rather than the police is not doing so out of religious reasons but trying to "hush it up, to cover it up, to prevent the victim from finding redress. There is no doubt at all: Mesirah ['informing'] has no application whatsoever to instances of child sexual abuse. To use mesirah in this way is an abomination." Gutnick also lamented that there was no formal training for rabbis on how to handle reported abuse.

Manny Waks, an advocate for victims, said, "Today, Rabbi Moshe Gutnick restored my faith in ultra-Orthodox Judaism. For the first time ever the reform that is so critical seems much closer. Thank you Rabbi Gutnick. Hopefully the rest of the Orthodox Rabbinate will now follow suit. What an incredible day for justice."

=== Knox Grammar School and the Uniting Church ===
On 23 February 2015 the commission started hearings concerning the response of Knox Grammar School and the Uniting Church in Australia to complaints and criminal proceedings involving teachers who sexually abused students. The Commission's remit includes inquiring into the 'systems, policies and procedures' involving the school's response to the complaints since 1970, and the experiences of former students sexually abused by teaching staff. Four teachers from Knox had been convicted of sexual offences against Knox students.

A former Knox teacher, a resident master at the schools boarding house in 1988, was summonsed to appear at the Commission, but failed to do so. A warrant was issued by the Commission for his arrest.

During hearings in early March 2015, several former Knox students and staff alleged that headmaster Ian Paterson did not refer several allegations of sex abuse he received to the police, despite there being a requirement for such allegations to be reported from 1988. The commission heard that in fact Paterson had never reported any student's allegation of sexual abuse to police during his thirty years in charge of the school. Paterson also stated that he had allowed several teachers accused of sexual abuse to resign and subsequently gave them positive references. Paterson denied that he had covered up the sexual abuse of students, arguing that he had responded to the allegations brought to his attention, and stated that "I should have known and I should have stopped the events that led to the abuse and its tragic consequences for these boys in my care and their families". Paterson stated that he was not aware that it was a crime for a teacher to grope or sexually proposition a student. Following the section of the hearing concerning Paterson, the current headmaster John Weeks stated that the school had changed considerably since the end of Paterson's period in the role and that Knox's Paterson Centre for Ethics and Business Studies would be renamed.

Weeks also gave evidence to the Royal Commission. During this hearing he was questioned over why he had not sacked the teacher who was arrested in 2009 despite having received allegations in 2007 that the teacher had behaved improperly with a student during the 1980s. Weeks told the media that the allegations had not been detailed or specific, and he had received advice that "it would have been difficult on industrial grounds" to have dismissed the teacher. Weeks also stated that he had reported the teacher to the police child protection unit, but the relevant police inspector gave evidence that a report had not been made.

=== Catholic Church authorities in Ballarat ===
The Royal Commission's final report of Catholic Church authorities in Ballarat was released on 6 December 2017. It covered sexual abuse in the Roman Catholic Diocese of Ballarat including the Congregation of Christian Brothers.

The Royal Commission's final report, published on 15 December, found that three bishops knew and did nothing about complaints of sexual abuse, namely James O'Collins, Ronald Mulkearns and Peter Connors. It found that 139 people made claims of child sexual abuse to the Diocese of Ballarat between 1980 and 2015, and that there were 21 alleged perpetrators identified in claims. Of the 21 alleged perpetrators 17 were priests which is 8.7% of the priests who ministered during this period. The final report included recommendations 16.6 through 16.26. They include the introduction of mandatory reporting/national standards, screening candidates before and during seminary or religious formation, the introduction of voluntary celibacy for diocesan clergy, to remove the requirement to destroy documents relating to canonical criminal cases in materials of morals, where the accused cleric has died or ten years have elapsed from the condemnatory sentence, amend canon law to remove the time limit (prescription) for commencement of canonical actions relating to child sexual abuse, the bishop of the diocese should ensure that parish priests are not the employers of principals and teachers in Catholic schools, modifications to canon law and for more transparency.

The Commission found that Bishop Mulkearns failed to take action "Bishop Mulkearns again was derelict in his duty in failing to take any effective action to have (infamous paedophile Gerald) Ridsdale referred to police and to restrict Ridsdale's contact with children". The Commission pointed to the structure of the Diocese, culture and governance, concluding: "The most likely explanation for the conduct of Bishop Mulkearns and other senior clergy in the Diocese was that they were trying to minimise the risk of scandal and protect the reputation of the Catholic Church. The Melbourne report found that former Ballarat Diocese Bishop Peter Connors was part of a culture that practiced "using oblique or euphemistic language in correspondence and records concerning complaints of child sexual abuse". The Commission found that, "Many children, mainly boys, said they were sexually abused at St Alipius and/or St Patrick's College." That most allegations at St Patrick's College were related to Ted Dowlan who taught there from 1973 to 1975. "A number of the survivors who gave evidence said they believed a number of their classmates from St Alipius and St Patrick's College had died by suicide or died prematurely," because of the abuse and that there was systematic minimisation and cover up of the abuse.

Here are some extracts from the conclusion of the Royal Commission into Institutional Responses to Child Sexual Abuse's report into Case Study 28 – Catholic Church authorities in Ballarat:

This case study exposed a catastrophic failure in the leadership of the Diocese and ultimately in the structure and culture of the Church over decades to effectively respond to the sexual abuse of children by its priests. That failure led to the suffering and often irreparable harm to children, their families and the wider community. That harm could have been avoided if the Church had acted in the interests of children rather than in its own interests.

Euphemistic and elliptical language was often used in correspondence and minutes to mask the true nature of the conduct discussed. There was repeated reference to 'pressures', 'strains' and unspecified 'problems'. On occasions, records were deliberately not made or kept or were destroyed.

The result of these inexcusable failures was that more children were sexually abused by Catholic clergy in the Diocese. There was a catastrophic institutional failure which resulted in many children being sexually abused. We heard about the devastating, often lifelong, consequences in the lives of those children. The welfare of children was not the primary concern of Bishop Mulkearns and other senior members of the Diocese when responding to complaints and allegation of child sexual abuse against their priests. There is no doubt it should have been.

The report on Ballarat also described the impact it had on victims. One section outlines suicide and premature death caused from the abuse. One victim said:

Newspapers don't report suicides, so the public doesn't hear about the broken families and their shared lives, about the unseen impact of institutional child sexual abuse. Children are left behind and they don't understand why. It doesn't end when the abuse ends.

Other harms are outlined. Another victim outlines the general harm in the Ballarat community:

Such chronic sexual abuse in the Ballarat community has led to a large number of men who are not able to be productive members of society and intellects have become either emotional, social or financial burdens upon the community.

Evidence at the Royal Commission revealed "the extensive effects (of sexual abuse) on every aspect of a child's development. Their capacity to form relationships, their ability to function at school, their ability to progress in education and their ability to progress in employment are all affected". Professor Carolyn Quadrio, psychiatrist and expert witness described a variety of behaviours seen in children often associated with sexual abuse and how these are frequently misunderstood, where such behaviours are "easier to spot in little children, as older children are more likely to cover it up" as a form of shame and self-blame. Not all children of sexual abuse will show symptoms. A-symptomatic children account for 20 to 40 per cent, with some becoming symptomatic later on. Quadrio referred to this as the 'sleeper effect'. Survivor witnesses at the commission described this effect. One witness said it took 26 years before "he fell apart and broke down". The effects of trauma on children, both physical and psychological, can impact longevity.

The Royal Commission's final report of Catholic Church authorities in Ballarat was released on 6 December. The report found that 56 Christian Brothers had claims of sexual abuse made against them in Ballarat and that there "was a complete failure by the Christian Brothers to protect the most vulnerable children in their care". The Commissioners found that in one instances after a complaint was made to Brother Nangle about Brother Dowlan (who was later jailed for sexual abuse) was putting his hands down students' pants a student was required to apologise to the school assembly for "spreading lies".

The response to complaints of sexual abuse was "grossly inadequate" and that Christian Brothers were moved after an allegation had been made. The Report found:

Often, the Christian Brother in question was allowed to remain in the position he held where the allegations arose, with continuing access to children.

On many occasions, the Brother was moved to a new location after a complaint or allegation was made about his conduct. In some cases, the reason given for the move was to conceal the true reason for it and to protect the reputation of the Christian Brothers and avoid scandal and embarrassment.

During the Royal Commission it was found that 853 children, average age 13, had been sexually abused by one or more Christian Brothers. Child abuse complaints were made against 281 Christian Brothers, and the Congregation had paid A$37.3 million in compensation. During the Ballarat Case Study of the Royal Commission it was found that Glynis McNeight, a private investigator, was paid for by the Christian Brothers, through a retained law firm, pursued victims and their families who were sexually abused by Brother Edward Dowlan. McNeight's report was tabled which contained a strategy to manipulate witnesses such as a victim could be "easily be torn down in the witness box" and "The person himself is a very nervous, excitable type who will reduce to tears and bad language easily". It was also shown that the Christian Brothers knew of abuse from Brothers but did not tell police and spent almost $1.5 million defending paedophile Brother Robert Best, Edward Dowlan and Stephen Farrell.

=== Jehovah's Witnesses ===
In July and August 2015, the royal commission examined the handling of child sexual abuse cases by Jehovah's Witnesses in Australia. Their "case studies showed that it was a common practice of religious institutions to adopt 'in-house' responses when dealing with allegations of child sexual abuse." The court questioned Geoffrey Jackson, a member of the Governing Body.

The hearing was told that in response to a summons issued by the commission, the Watch Tower Society had produced 5,000 documents relating to 1,006 case files of allegations of child sexual abuse reported to Jehovah's Witness elders in Australia since 1950—each file for a different alleged perpetrator of child sexual abuse, including 579 cases in which the perpetrator confessed. The "case study regarding the Jehovah's Witnesses showed that the organisation dealt with allegations of child sexual abuse in accordance with internal, scripturally based disciplinary policies and procedures." The documents showed that of the alleged perpetrators, "not one was reported by the Church to secular authorities". The commission was told: "This suggests that it is the practice of the Jehovah's Witness Church to retain information regarding child sexual abuse offences but not to report allegations of child sexual abuse to the police or other relevant authorities." Officers of the royal commission "referred information in relation to 514 alleged perpetrators to police", adding that "of the remaining 492 alleged perpetrators identified in the case files, officers at the Royal Commission determined that there was either insufficient evidence in the case files to warrant referring matters to police or that the matters had already come to the attention of police".

The royal commission found that it "[did] not consider the Jehovah's Witness organisation to be an organisation which responds adequately to child sexual abuse. ... The organisation's retention and continued application of policies such as the two-witness rule in cases of child sexual abuse shows a serious lack of understanding of the nature of child sexual abuse." In its final report, the royal commission added, "As long as the Jehovah's Witness organisation continues to ... [rely on a literal interpretation of the Bible and 1st century principles to set practice, policy and procedure] ... in its response to allegations of child sexual abuse, it will remain an organisation that does not respond adequately to child sexual abuse and that fails to protect children."

=== Geelong Grammar School ===
In September and October 2015, the Royal Commission held a public hearing into sexual abuse at the Geelong Grammar School, an elite Anglican boarding school for boys which had once counted the then Prince Charles among its students. In 2015-2016 the Royal Commission then investigated the allegations brought forth at the hearings, and handed down a report published in February 2017, which is available on the internet. The report details many incidents of abuse by the school staff between 1956 and 1989, including three Anglican priests, three boarding house masters, and a live-in boarding house assistant. (p. 20-30) One can sense from the testimony of former students that Geelong was a "strict, authoritarian and regimented place" (p. 21), where sexual abuse was just the tip of the iceberg in terms of what would lead an adolescent boy to despair. One complainant said he witnessed "repeated physical and psychological abuse" in addition to sexual abuse, and that there was a "code of silence" about this at the school; all of this left him with a sense of "shame, helplessness and powerlessness". (p. 29) Three of the sexual abuse cases led in the victims to later struggles with depression, suicidal thoughts, and attempted suicide. (p. 26, 28, 31) Five former staff members of the school were convicted of child sex offences. (p. 31-32)

=== Australian Defence Force ===
The Commission held a public hearing to inquire into the experiences of men and women who were sexually abused as children in certain divisions of the Australian Defence Force (ADF). It also examined the systems, policies, practices and procedures of the ADF and the ADF Cadets to prevent child sexual abuse, and raising and responding to concerns and complaints about child sexual abuse. On 22 August 2017 the Commission released reports into abuse within the ADF, and found that at HMAS Leeuwin the physical and sexual abuse of child recruits was widespread, with "bastardisation" practices that involved a junior recruit being held down while boot polish, toothpaste or another substance was forcibly smeared on his genitals or anal area also took place at Leeuwin. At The Army Apprentice School, Balcombe on the Mornington Peninsula, teenage apprentices were severely sexually abused during the 1970s and 1980s. The abuse included fondling of genitals, forced masturbation, anal penetration with an object such as a broomstick and "bastardisation" practices primarily perpetrated by senior apprentices or staff. A 15-year old cadet within the Australian Air Force Cadets in Tasmania, committed suicide following the improper handling of an incident of an improper relationship that was instigated by a senior officer.

== Reports ==
The federal government requested an initial report from the commission not later than 30 June 2014 as well as a recommendation for the date for the final report not later than 31 December 2015. On 13 November 2014 Governor-General Sir Peter Cosgrove amended the letters patent extending the date for submission of the final report to "not later than 15 December 2017".

An interim report was released on 30 June 2014 and included "the personal stories of 150 people who shared their experience of abuse by coming to a private session or providing a written account." At that time there were still around 3000 more sessions on a waiting list to be heard. In June 2015 the Royal Commission released a report, prepared by the Parenting Research Centre, that assessed the extent to which 288 recommendations from 67 previous, relevant inquiries have been implemented.

Following the conclusion of each public hearing, case study reports were released on findings and recommendations for each of the above-mentioned cases.

Criminal justice report recommendations were published in the final report dated 15 December 2017.

== Outcomes ==
On 22 October 2018, the Prime Minister of Australia, Scott Morrison, delivered in Parliament House a National Apology Address on behalf of the Australian people:

... The crimes of ritual sexual abuse happened in schools, churches, youth groups, scout troops, orphanages, foster homes, sporting clubs, group homes, charities, and in family homes as well. It happened anywhere a predator thought they could get away with it, and the systems within these organisations allowed it to happen and turned a blind eye. It happened day after day, week after week, month after month, and decade after decade. Unrelenting torment. When a child spoke up, they weren't believed and the crimes continued with impunity. One survivor told me that when he told a teacher of his abuse, that teacher then became his next abuser. Trust broken. Innocence betrayed. Power and position exploited for evil dark crimes. A survivor named Faye told the Royal Commission, "Nothing takes the memories away. It happened 53 years ago and it's still affecting me." One survivor named Ann said, "My mother believed them rather than me". I also met with a mother whose two daughters were abused by a priest the family trusted. Suicide would claim one of her two beautiful girls and the other lives under the crushing weight of what was done to her ... We can never promise a world where there are no abusers. But we can promise a country where we commit to hear and believe our children ... I present the formal apology to be tabled in this Parliament today, which will be handed to those in the Great Hall shortly. It reflects all of the sentiments that I have expressed on behalf of the Australian people, this Parliament and our Government.

— Scott Morrison, Prime Minister of Australia, 22 October 2018

Morrison announced that the federal government had not rejected any recommendations of the royal commission, that it was working on 104 of the 122 recommendations that were addressed to the Commonwealth and had established:

- a National Redress Scheme with the support of the states and territories administrations;
- the National Office of Child Safety within the Department of Social Services; and
- a National Centre of Excellence to raise awareness and understanding of the impacts of child sexual abuse, to deal with the stigma, to support help seeking and guide best practice for training and other services.

=== Supreme Court's "Institutional Liability List" ===
On 8 May 2020, the Victorian Supreme Court established an Institutional Liability List to administer child sex abuse lawsuits. The list includes claims for damages arising from the Royal Commission into Institutional Responses to Child Sexual Abuse. The Royal Commission's allegations against George Pell and the Roman Catholic Diocese of Ballarat played a role in the creation of the list.

== See also ==
- Children in State Care Commission of Inquiry (the Mullighan Inquiry), a South Australian inquiry that took place from 2004 to 2008
