= Diocese of Ballarat =

Diocese of Ballarat, located in Victoria (Australia), may refer to:

- Anglican Diocese of Ballarat
- Roman Catholic Diocese of Ballarat
