= Temuniana =

Africa Proconsulare (125 AD)

Temuniana was a Roman town of Roman North Africa which existed during the Vandal Kingdom, Byzantine Empire and Roman Empire.

== Archaeology ==
The Roman town of Temuniana has been tentatively identified with ruins at Henchir-Temounia, in Tunisia., in Tunisia. These ruins include many subterranean cisterns, There are also remains of pipes and dams.

== History ==
Temuniana was also the seat of an ancient Catholic diocese There are three bishops of antiquity known from the town:

- Cresconius, episc. Plebis Temonianensis. Fl 411.
- Cresconius Temoniarensis, fl.484.
- Victorinus, episc. Ecc. Temunianensis, fl641.

Today the bishopric survives as a titular see of the Roman Catholic Church. The current bishop is Robert Anthony Brucato who replaced Peter Joseph Connors of Ballarat in 1997.
