= Ronald Mulkearns =

Australian Roman Catholic bishop (1930–2016)

The Most Reverend Ronald Mulkearns
- 6th Roman Catholic Bishop of Ballarat
- Church: Roman Catholic
- Diocese: Ballarat
- Previous post: Titular Bishop of Cululi

Orders
- Ordination: 22 July 1956 (Priest)
- Consecration: 1 May 1971 (Bishop)

Personal details
- Born: Ronald Austin Mulkearns; 11 November 1930 Caulfield, Victoria, Australia
- Died: 3 April 2016 (aged 85)
- Denomination: Roman Catholicism
- Occupation: Roman Catholic bishop
- Profession: Cleric

Ronald Austin Mulkearns (11 November 1930 – 3 April 2016) was the bishop emeritus of the Roman Catholic Diocese of Ballarat in Ballarat, Australia, a diocese in the ecclesiastical province of Melbourne. He resigned as bishop on 30 May 1997. The Royal Commission into Institutional Responses to Child Sexual Abuse found that Mulkearns was "derelict in his duty".

== Career ==
Mulkearns was ordained as a priest in 1956. He held a doctorate in canon law and was one of the founders of the Canon Law Society of Australia and New Zealand. He was consecrated as Bishop of Ballarat in 1971. He served in that role for over 26 years, until he resigned in 1997.

== Royal Commission into child sexual abuse ==
=== Apology ===
In February 2016, Mulkearns apologised during video link testimony to the Royal Commission into Institutional Responses to Child Sexual Abuse for failing to halt what he called a "problem with priests" – the widespread and long-lasting sexual abuse of children at Ballarat's Catholic schools during his term as bishop, including the notorious case of convicted child abuser Gerald Ridsdale.

=== Findings ===
The Royal Commission into Institutional Responses to Child Sexual Abuse released its final report in December 2017 and found that Bishop Mulkearns knew of several allegations, including that Monsignor John Day had sexually abused children in the 1970s. By late 1975 Father Gerald Ridsdale had admitted to Mulkearns that he had offended against children. The commission said Ridsdale should never have been appointed to Horsham because Bishop Mulkearns knew about sexual allegations against Ridsdale at the time. The Commission found in its report on Ballarat that Mulkearns was dismissive of complaints and complainants and concluded:

This case study exposed a catastrophic failure in the leadership of the Diocese and ultimately in the structure and culture of the Church over decades to effectively respond to the sexual abuse of children by its priests. That failure led to the suffering and often irreparable harm to children, their families and the wider community. That harm could have been avoided if the Church had acted in the interests of children rather than in its own interests.

One of the victims who told their stories to the Royal Commission was Paul Levey. At the age of 14 Levey was sent to live with Ridsdale at the presbytery in Mortlake. Levey said he was "sexually abused all the time just about every day" and the Commission heard evidence that Ronald Mulkearns was among a number of clergy who knew Ridsdale had a boy living with him, but Mulkearns failed to intervene. The commission found that Mulkearns "ignored" pleas from Paul Levey's mother who was "concerned about the situation and sought his assistance" even though "By this time, Bishop Mulkearns knew of Ridsdale’s admission of offending against boys." The Commission stated that Bishop Mulkearns’ response to Paul Levey living with Ridsdale in the Mortlake presbytery "demonstrated a total absence of concern for the welfare of that boy". The commission also heard that every boy at the school at Mortlake between the age of 10 and 16 had been abused by Gerard Ridsdale. One victim held a photo of a class from St Alipius Primary School and stated that 12 of the 33 boys had committed suicide because of the abuse.

As a result, from the evidence made public during the Royal Commission, Mulkearn's name has been removed from many buildings in the diocese. Victims have called for the removal of plaques at Warrnambool, Mortlake, Noorat and Koroit. Bishop Bird said he thought removing plaques was going too far. In 2014, The Australian Catholic University's Aquinas campus also removed Mulkearns' name from its lecture theatre for his failure to act on paedophile priests.

== Illness, death, and burial ==
Mulkearns developed colorectal cancer toward the end of his life and died on 3 April 2016. His funeral service was held at Nazareth House where he spent the last final months at the nursing home. Ballarat clergy sex abuse survivor Phil Nagle said: "His passing means a lot of secrets and sins will go to the grave with him." Mulkearns was the first bishop of the diocese to be refused a burial in the cathedral crypt, and was interred at the Ballarat General Cemetery in a small ceremony. According to Ballarat diocese vicar-general Justin Driscoll, that was "a direct response to the revelations of the Royal Commission. It was not appropriate for the former bishop to be buried there [the crypt]". Driscoll said the action would be a "permanent and painful reminder" of the abuse, and the cover up by the church authorities. Mulkearns left most of his estate, including a Fairhaven property valued at more than $2 million, to the Diocese of Ballarat. The succeeding Bishop of Ballarat, Paul Bird, announced in September 2016 that all profits from Mulkearns' estate would be given to victims of abuse.

== See also ==
- Roman Catholic Church in Australia

Catholic Church titles
Preceded by James O'Collins	6th Catholic Bishop of Ballarat; 1971–1997	Succeeded by Peter Connors
