= Gerald Ridsdale =

Australian laicised Catholic priest and sex offender (1934–2025)

- Born: Gerald Francis Ridsdale; 20 May 1934; St Arnaud, Victoria, Australia
- Died: 18 February 2025 (aged 90); Port Phillip Prison, Truganina, Victoria, Australia
- Status: Deceased
- Convictions: Indecent assault (30 counts) (1993); Child sexual abuse (46 counts) (1993); Indecent assault (35 counts) (2006); Indecent assault (27 counts), Buggery, carnal knowledge (2013)
- Penalty: 12 months' custody with three-month non-parole period; 18 years' custody with a three-year non-parole period; 13 years' custody with a six-year non-parole period; 8 years' custody

Gerald Francis Ridsdale (20 May 1934 – 18 February 2025) was an Australian laicised Catholic priest and prolific sex offender.

He was convicted between 1993 and 2017 of a large number of child sexual abuse and indecent assault charges against 65 children aged as young as four years. The majority of the offences occurred from the 1960s to the 1980s while Ridsdale worked as a school chaplain at St Alipius Primary School, a boys' boarding school in the Victorian regional city of Ballarat.

The Royal Commission into Institutional Responses to Child Sexual Abuse found that senior figures in the church, including Cardinal George Pell, knew about Ridsdale's prolific sexual abuse of children but protected him. Ridsdale was ordained at St Patrick's Cathedral, Ballarat, in 1961. The first complaint about his behaviour towards children was received by the church that same year. Ridsdale held 16 different appointments over a period of 29 years as a priest, with an average of 1.8 years per appointment.

== Career and allegations of offences ==
Ridsdale was born at St Arnaud in central Victoria and grew up in Ballarat. It was alleged in 2013 that Ridsdale sexually abused boys as early as 1955, when he was aged 21. He attended school at St Patrick’s College, and in 2016 he had his name blacked out from an honour board which honoured former students who took holy orders.

Ridsdale worked at St Alipius Primary School, Ballarat, a boys' boarding school, from 1971, where he was a chaplain. He also worked in Apollo Bay in 1972–73. At his 1994 trial it was said that he had been sent to a psychologist as early as 1971, though the bishop of the Roman Catholic Diocese of Ballarat, Ronald Mulkearns, said he had no idea of Ridsdale's actions until 1975, when the priest was in Inglewood. One parent said Ridsdale had molested their son, but they were reluctant to let the boy be questioned by police, and the priest had moved. When a police officer involved with the case spoke to Mulkearns, the latter promised to handle Ridsdale but moved him on instead. Operation Arcadia, a three-month police investigation into what Mulkearns knew about Ridsdale, concluded that he knew about Ridsdale's crimes earlier than he admitted.

Ridsdale was moved repeatedly. In 1976, he was moved to Edenhope. In 1980 he was moved to the National Pastoral Institute in Elsternwick in Melbourne. In 1981, he was moved to Mortlake; at the end of 1982, he was transferred to Sydney. In 1986, he was moved to Horsham, where two people made complaints about him in 1988. In 1990, he was sent to New Mexico, United States, "for treatment". He returned to Australia after nine months and was appointed chaplain at St John of God Hospital in Richmond, New South Wales, on the northwestern outskirts of Sydney.

=== Convictions ===
While he was working at the hospital, a victim phoned Victoria Police in November 1992, leading to Ridsdale's arrest in February 1993. In May 1993, Ridsdale was charged on summons in the Melbourne Magistrates Court with 30 counts of indecent assault against nine boys aged between 12 and 16 between 1974 and 1980. George Pell, then an auxiliary bishop of Melbourne, testified before the 1993 hearing that he and Ridsdale had shared a clergy house together while Pell was an assistant priest at St Alipius' Church with Ridsdale in the 1970s. Pell denied knowing about any of Ridsdale's abuse. Journalist and former priest Paul Bongiorno, who also lived in a presbytery with Ridsdale, told ABC radio that Ridsdale concealed his activities: "They hide it. It was certainly hidden from me. And when it came out, after I'd left the priesthood, I was shocked and I was ashamed." Ridsdale pleaded guilty and was sentenced to 12 months' jail with a non-parole period of three months. A few weeks later, in 1994, Ridsdale was again put on trial. He pleaded guilty to 46 charges of abusing 20 boys and one girl between 1961 and 1982. He was sentenced to 18 years' imprisonment with a minimum of 15 years, to be served cumulatively with the previous sentence.

In 2006, Ridsdale pleaded guilty to 35 charges relating to indecent assault against 10 boys between 1970 and 1987 in Bacchus Marsh, Ballarat, Warrnambool, Edenhope, Horsham and Mortlake. He was sentenced to 13 years' imprisonment with a minimum of seven years, three years of which was ordered to be served concurrently (the remainder of the previous sentence). A few of his victims criticised the leniency of the sentence.

In 2013, weeks before Ridsdale was eligible for parole, Ridsdale was charged with an additional 84 offences against 14 victims committed between 1961 and 1981. He pleaded guilty to 29 counts (27 of indecent assault, one count of buggery and one count of carnal knowledge of a girl under the age of 16) committed between 1960 and 1980 and asked for a further 27 counts to be taken into consideration at sentencing. After pleading guilty to the above charges, including raping and abusing children as young as four, Ridsdale was sentenced to eight years in prison in April 2014, with the judge ordering he be eligible for parole in April 2019. These charges brought the number of Ridsdale's confirmed victims to 54.

On 13 April 2017, Ridsdale pleaded guilty to a further 20 offences against 10 boys and a girl. These offences were committed between 1961 and 1988 in western Victoria and were also expected to extend his release date further into the future. On 15 August 2017, Ridsdale pleaded guilty to 23 charges, including two counts of rape and one of buggery, for abusing 12 children, 11 boys and 1 girl aged 6 to 13, between 1962 and 1988 in Ballarat and the surrounding area. He was sentenced to 11 years' imprisonment, with five years cumulative. One of the victims told the court she was abused numerous times by Ridsdale, including being assaulted on the altar of a Ballarat church, while another victim said that Ridsdale abused him hundreds of times. By August 2017, the number of known victims of Ridsdale was 65.

On 14 May 2020, a Victorian County Court Judge, Gerard Mullaly, extended Ridsdale's non-parole period, which was originally scheduled to end in 2022, by another two years to 2024.

A Victorian man, known to the royal commission as 'BAQ', alleged abuse by Ridsdale in the 1970s. On 10 April 2021, BAQ was given a $1.5 million settlement by the Diocese of Ballarat on the eve of the matter going to trial. BAQ was a pupil at St Alipius Boys' School, Ballarat where Ridsdale served as the school's chaplain.

Ridsdale was serving a 36-year jail sentence at Ararat Prison for abusing close to 70 victims, and died in prison on 18 February 2025, at the age of 90.

== Admissions of protection by the Diocese of Ballarat and civil lawsuit ==
On 13 September 2019, the Diocese of Ballarat released a statement admitting that high-ranking clergy in the diocese knew of sex abuse claims against Ridsdale and afterwards made efforts to shield him from prosecution. This confession came in the wake of a civil lawsuit filed against the diocese by one of Ridsdale's victims.

== Government inquiries ==
In 2008, fourteen of Ridsdale's victims formed a group to lobby the Department of Justice for an independent justice commission to investigate how victims were paid varying amounts of compensation by the Catholic Church. In 2012 the Parliament of Victoria established the Inquiry into the Handling of Child Abuse by Religious and other Non-Government Organisations. The inquiry tabled its report to parliament on 13 November 2013 and the government tabled its response to the inquiry's recommendations on 8 May 2014.

In May 2015, the Royal Commission into Institutional Responses to Child Sexual Abuse began an investigation into the response of relevant Catholic Church authorities to the impact of child sexual abuse on survivors of child sexual abuse, their families and the community of Ballarat. The hearing heard from residents, former students of St Joseph's Home, Ballarat, St Alipius Primary School, Ballarat East, St Alipius Parish, Ballarat East, St Patrick's College, Ballarat, and St Patrick's Christian Brothers Boys Primary School, Ballarat, and members of the Ballarat community about the impact of child sexual abuse on the community of Ballarat. Catholic clergy who were convicted of child sexual offences which took place within the geographical bounds of the Diocese of Ballarat also were invited to speak or make statements before the royal commission. Ridsdale gave evidence over two days by videolink from prison, detailing his memories of his abusing. David Ridsdale, a victim of child sexual abuse and the nephew of Ridsdale, gave evidence that he was sexually abused by his uncle between the ages of 11 and 15. The royal commission continued throughout most of 2017. The commission concluded, and its report was made public, in December 2017.

The Royal Commission into Institutional Responses to Child Sexual Abuse found that the then bishop of the Ballarat diocese, James O'Collins, had received a complaint in the 1960s that Ridsdale had sexually abused a boy but O’Collins did not take action. The royal commission was also told that Bishop Ronald Mulkearns knew in 1975 that Ridsdale had abused boys but Mulkearns had done nothing to stop the abuse from occurring. The commission found that "Bishop Mulkearns again was derelict in his duty in failing to take any effective action to have Ridsdale referred to police and to restrict Ridsdale's contact with children." Bishop Finnigan stated that Ridsdale was moved because "there was a concern that the complaints would be made public".

=== Paul Levey ===
The royal commission heard many accounts from victims, including Paul Levey who was sent to live alone with Ridsdale at the presbytery in Mortlake. When Levey's parents were going through marriage problems, Ridsdale became a regular visitor to their house, offering to help. Ridsdale took Levey to White Cliffs, New South Wales, where the priest would fossick for opals and began abusing the boy. When Levey's parents divorced, Ridsdale took him, aged 13, to live with him in the presbytery at Mortlake. Levey said that he was "sexually abused all the time just about every day". The commission heard evidence that Bishop Mulkearns was among a number of clergy who knew Ridsdale had a boy living with him but failed to intervene. It was also found that every boy at the school in Mortlake between the ages of 10 and 16 had been abused by Ridsdale.

On 7 May 2020, it was revealed that the royal commission report found that Pell knew about the abuse committed by Ridsdale and that when he was a member of the Diocese of Ballarat's college of consultors he deliberately took part in the effort to cover it up by approving Ridsdale's transfer from the Mortlake parish near Ballarat to Sydney in 1982. At least one of Ridsdale's victims, his nephew David Ridsdale, testified that Pell "tried to bribe" him "into keeping quiet" during a February 1983 phone conversation. Doubt was cast on how David Ridsdale interpreted the conversation. The commission also found that Pell was sufficiently conscious of child sexual abuse by clergy by 1973 to have considered measures of avoiding situations where it might occur, such as clergy taking boys on overnight camps.

=== Steve Blacker ===
Previously known only by the court issued pseudonym 'JCB', Steve Blacker was raped by Ridsdale in the confessional at St Colman's Church, Mortlake, in 1982. Blacker was nine years old and Ridsdale had been abusing children in Ballarat for at least 20 years prior.

In 2018, Blacker and his legal team sued the Diocese of Ballarat, stating that the diocese had known about Ridsdale's crimes for decades and breached its duty of care by moving him from parish to parish, where he sexually abused hundreds of children. Despite acknowledging they had complaints about Ridsdale dating back to 1974, the diocese fought Blacker on every point.

On 28 September 2019, the diocese finally admitted legal liability and settled with Blacker, paying him $1 million in compensation. This was the first time a Catholic religious authority in Australia had admitted legal liability in a child sex abuse case.

Blacker was interviewed by Sarah Ferguson for the ABC documentary series Revelation, where he spoke publicly for the first time about his abuse at the hands of Ridsdale. His account features in the third episode of the series.

== See also ==
- Congregation of Christian Brothers
