= Paul Bird (bishop) =

Australian bishop

The Most Reverend Paul Bird C.Ss.R.
- 8th Roman Catholic Bishop of Ballarat
- Church: Roman Catholic
- Diocese: Ballarat
- Appointed: 1 August 2012
- Term ended: 19 March 2026
- Predecessor: Peter Connors
- Successor: Mark Freeman

Orders
- Ordination: 17 May 1975 by John Toohey (Bishop of Maitland)
- Consecration: 16 October 2012 by Denis Hart (Archbishop of Melbourne)

Personal details
- Born: Paul Bernard Bird; 17 July 1949 (age 77) Newcastle, New South Wales, Australia
- Denomination: Roman Catholicism
- Parents: Maurice and Olive Bird (née Burley)
- Motto: Peace be with you

Paul Bird C.Ss.R. (born 17 July 1949) is a retired Australian prelate of the Catholic Church. He served as the Bishop of Ballarat from 2012 to 2026.

== Early life ==
Bird was born in Newcastle, New South Wales, on 17 July 1949, the third of four children born to Maurice and Olive Bird. He attended Catholic primary and high schools in the Newcastle area, attending St Francis Xavier Parish Primary School in Carrington, run by the Sisters of St Joseph, and Marist Brothers High School in Hamilton, run by the Marist Brothers.

He joined the formation program of the Congregation of the Most Holy Redeemer in 1966 and made his first profession at Galong on 11 February 1968. He studied at the Redemptorist seminary at Wendouree near Ballarat for four years before completing his studies at the Yarra Theological Union in Melbourne.

== Priesthood ==
Bird was ordained as a priest on 17 May 1975 at the Redemptorist Monastery in Waratah by Bishop John Toohey.

As a Redemptorist priest, he travelled across Australia, visiting parishes and conducting mission programs of prayer and preaching. In 1979, he went to Washington, D.C., United States to study a Master of Arts, specialising in liturgy, at the Catholic University of America. Returning home, he continued missionary work and began teaching liturgy.

In 1987, he was appointed superior of the Redemptorist community at Brighton in Melbourne and commenced twenty years of service as editor in the congregation’s publications ministry, Majellan Publications. He served in various roles on the Provincial Council of the Redemptorist Congregation over a 15 year period. He represented the Australian province at the Congregation's general chapter in 1991. In 2008, he was appointed Provincial of the Australian Province of the congregation with overall responsibility for the communities and missions in Australia, New Zealand, the Philippines, Singapore and Malaysia.

== Episcopate ==
Bird was appointed Bishop of Ballarat on 1 August 2012, following the retirement of Bishop Peter Joseph Connors. He was consecrated on 16 October 2012 at St Patrick's Cathedral, Ballarat by Archbishop Denis James Hart.

In January 2016, Bird became the first bishop in Australia to publicly join a global movement showing support for clergy child sex abuse victims by tying bright coloured ribbons to the Loud Fence outside St Patrick's Cathedral, Ballarat. Bird said that "If there is just silence between two people, then one doesn’t know what the other is thinking" and that "This gesture is a way to recognise the suffering and publicly show support to victims, survivors and their families."

In 2016, Bird announced that the estate of a former Bishop of Ballarat, Ronald Mulkearns, which had been left to the diocese, would be set aside to help victims of child sexual abuse committed by priests in the diocese. As bishop, Mulkearns had facilitated moving the priests to different parishes.

In August 2019, Bird acknowledged former Melbourne bishop George Pell's ties to the Ballarat diocese and also apologised for the history of sex abuse in the diocese.

== Retirement ==
Bird turned 75 on 17 July 2024 and tendered his resignation to Pope Francis but was asked to remain in the role until a successor could be found. On 7 January 2026, Pope Leo XIV accepted Bird's resignation as Bishop of Ballarat, more than a year after tendering his resignation. He was a principal co-consecrator of his successor, Bishop Mark William Freeman.

== See also ==
- Roman Catholic Church in Australia

Catholic Church titles
Preceded by Peter Connors	8th Catholic Bishop of Ballarat; 2012–present	Succeeded by incumbent
