= Broken Rites =

Non-profit Australian support group

Broken Rites Australia
- Founded: 1992
- Founder: Chris Wilding
- Location: Victoria, Australia
- Website: www.brokenrites.org.au

Broken Rites, or formally Broken Rites (Australia) Collective Inc., is an Australian non-profit organisation that supports and advocates for victims of sexual abuse within the Catholic Church in Australia and other churches, while also acting to investigate allegations of sexual abuse, expose the accused, and track the progress of court cases.

== Mission and activities ==
During Pope Benedict XVI's 2008 visit to Australia, Broken Rites welcomed the pontiff's apology for the abuse affairs, but expressed disappointment that he had not made his apology directly to sexual abuse victims and criticized the selection of the victims as having been hand-picked to be cooperative.
