= Roman Catholic Diocese of Ballarat =

Catholic ecclesiastical territory

Diocese of Ballarat Dioecesis Ballaratensis
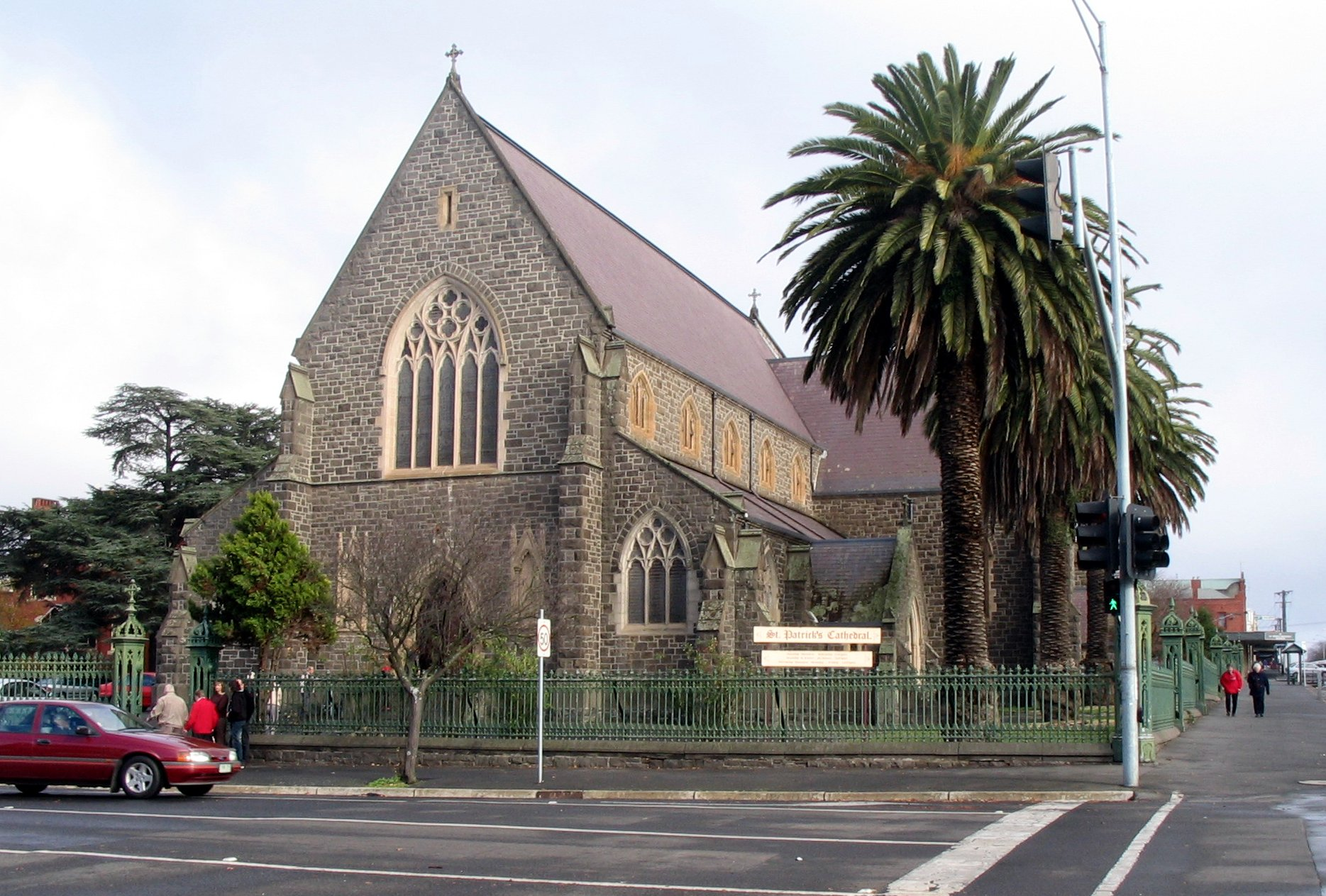
- St Patrick's Cathedral, Ballarat

Location
- Country: Australia
- Ecclesiastical province: Melbourne
- Metropolitan: Archdiocese of Melbourne
- Coordinates: 37°34′18″S 143°51′00″E

Statistics
- Area: 58,000 km^{2} (22,000 sq mi)
- Population: Total; Catholics: (as of 2006); ▲384,000; ▲97,900 ( 25.2%)
- Parishes: 52

Information
- Denomination: Catholic
- Sui iuris church: Latin Church
- Rite: Roman Rite
- Established: 30 March 1874
- Cathedral: St Patrick's Cathedral

Current leadership
- Pope: Leo XIV
- Bishop: Mark Freeman
- Metropolitan Archbishop: Peter Comensoli
- Bishops emeritus: Peter Connors, Paul Bird

Map

Website
- ballarat.catholic.org.au

The Diocese of Ballarat, based in Ballarat, Australia, is a Roman Catholic diocese in the ecclesiastical province of Melbourne. It is a suffragan diocese of the Archdiocese of Melbourne and was established in 1874. Its geography covers the west, Wimmera and Mallee regions of Victoria. The cathedral is in St Patrick's Cathedral, Ballarat.

The diocese has been prominent in Australia for its number of cases of sexual abuse by clergy and members of religious orders. In the New York Times in December 2017 it was stated that "The most damaging revelations about child sexual abuse have centered on scandals in towns like Ballarat" after the Royal Commission into Institutional Responses to Child Sexual Abuse published its findings. Priests and brothers in the Ballarat diocese were sharing victims, passing on intelligence about vulnerable children, and protecting each other: the abuse was more organised than previously thought since the royal commission. A significant ruling in 2021, the first in Australia, found that the diocese can be vicariously liable for compensation regarding abuse that occurred from its own priests. This ruling was later overturned by the High Court in Nov 2024.

In May 2020, newly released details in a royal commission report stated that Cardinal George Pell, a former Diocese of Ballarat priest, knew of sex abuse in the diocese as early as 1973. In response, Pell said he was "surprised" and that the royal commission's findings "are not supported by evidence".

== History ==
The Diocese of Ballarat was established on 30 March 1874, from the Diocese of Melbourne. At the same time, the Diocese of Melbourne was made an archdiocese while Ballarat became one of its suffragans.

Bishop Peter Connors retired as Bishop of Ballarat on 1 August 2012 and Father Paul Bird CSsR was appointed by Pope Benedict XVI to succeed him. He was ordained bishop on 16 October 2012. Bishop Paul Bird (born 17 July 1949) is a member of the missionary Congregation of the Most Holy Redeemer (Redemptorist).

== Bishops ==
=== Ordinaries ===
The following individuals have been the Roman Catholic Bishop of Ballarat:

Order	Name	Date enthroned	Reign ended	Term of office	Reason for term end
1	Michael O'Connor †	24 April 1874	14 February 1883	8 years, 296 days	Died in office
2	James Moore †	12 January 1884	26 June 1904	20 years, 166 days	Died in office
3	Joseph Higgins †	3 March 1905	16 September 1915	10 years, 197 days	Died in office
4	Daniel Foley †	12 April 1916	31 October 1941	25 years, 202 days	Died in office
5	James O'Collins †	23 December 1941	1 May 1971	29 years, 129 days	Retired at age 79. Bishop Emeritus of Ballarat. Died 25 November 1983
6	Ronald Mulkearns †	1 May 1971	30 May 1997	26 years, 29 days	Resigned. Bishop Emeritus of Ballarat. Died 4 April 2016
7	Peter Connors	30 May 1997	1 August 2012	15 years, 63 days	Retired at age 75. Bishop Emeritus of Ballarat
8	Paul Bird	1 August 2012	19 March 2026	13 years, 230 days	Retired aged 75
9	Mark Freeman	19 March 2026	incumbent	245 days	

=== Coadjutor bishop ===
- Ronald Austin Mulkearns † (1968–1971)

=== Other priests of the diocese who became bishops ===
- Joseph Basil Roper, appointed Bishop of Toowoomba in 1938
- George Pell, appointed an auxiliary bishop of Melbourne in 1987; future cardinal
- Brian Vincent Finnigan, appointed Auxiliary Bishop of Brisbane in 2002
- Shane Anthony Mackinlay, appointed Bishop of Sandhurst in 2019

== Other information ==
The diocese is bounded by the South Australian border (the Archdiocese of Adelaide and the Diocese of Port Pirie), the Murray River (the Diocese of Wilcannia-Forbes) and the Southern Ocean. To the east is the Diocese of Sandhurst and the Archdiocese of Melbourne. The diocese has 52 parishes, 39 clergy and four parish leaders. The seat of the diocese is St Patrick's Cathedral, Ballarat.

== Diocese of Ballarat Catholic Education Limited ==
Secondary schools under the governance of the Diocese of Ballarat Catholic Education Limited (DOBCEL) include:

- Mercy Regional College, Camperdown
- Trinity College Colac
- St Brigid's College, Horsham
- Damascus College Ballarat
- St Mary MacKillop College, Swan Hill

== Child sexual abuse ==
The Diocese of Ballarat has been part of the Catholic sexual abuse scandal, which includes a series of convictions, trials and ongoing investigations into allegations of sex crimes committed by Catholic priests and members of religious orders.

=== Victorian government inquiry ===
In 2012 the Parliament of Victoria established the Inquiry into the Handling of Child Abuse by Religious and other Non-Government Organisations. The Inquiry tabled its report to Parliament on 13 November 2013 and the Government tabled its response to the Inquiry's recommendations on 8 May 2014.

The systemic problem of sexual abuse was highlighted in the Victoria Police submission into the parliamentary inquiry into the handling of child abuse by churches. "Confidential police reports detail the suicides of at least 40 people sexually abused by Catholic clergy in Victoria and say it appeared the church knew about a shockingly high rate of suicides and premature deaths but had chosen to remain silent".

Cardinal George Pell also confirmed in the Victorian parliamentary inquiry that "some members of the Church tried to cover up child sexual abuse by other members of the clergy" as the ABC states.

There have been 130 claims and substantiated complaints of child sexual abuse against the Ballarat diocese since 1980. At least 14 priests of the Diocese of Ballarat have been the subject of one or more claims and substantiated complaints of child sex abuse.

=== Federal government inquiry ===
In May 2015, the Royal Commission into Institutional Responses to Child Sexual Abuse, a royal commission of inquiry initiated in 2013 by and supported by all state governments, began an investigation into the response of relevant Catholic Church authorities to the impact of child sexual abuse on survivors of child sexual abuse, their families and the community of Ballarat. The hearing heard about the impact of child sexual abuse on the community of Ballarat from residents and from former students of St Joseph's Home, Ballarat; St Alipius Primary School, Ballarat East; St Alipius Parish, Ballarat East; St Patrick's College, Ballarat; and St Patrick's Christian Brothers Boys Primary School, Ballarat. Catholic clergy who were convicted of child sexual offences which took place within the diocese were also invited to speak or make statements before the commission.

During the 2016 Royal Commission into Institutional Responses to Child Sexual Abuse in Ballarat it was found that 853 children, average age 13, had been sexually abused by one or more Christian Brothers and that at least 30 victims had since committed suicide in Ballarat. Child abuse complaints were made against 281 Christian Brothers, and the Congregation had paid A$37.3 million in compensation. It was found that every boy at the school at Mortlake between the age of 10 and 16 had been abused by Gerard Ridsdale and one victim held a photo of a class from St Alipius Primary School and stated that 12 of the 33 boys had committed suicide because of the abuse.

During the Ballarat Case Study of the royal commission it was found that Glynis McNeight, a private investigator, was paid for by the Christian Brothers through a retained law firm, Doyle Considine solicitors, which pursued victims sexually abused by Brother Edward Dowlan. McNeight's report was tabled which contained strategy to manipulate witnesses, such as a victim could "easily be torn down in the witness box" and "The person himself is a very nervous, excitable type who will reduce to tears and bad language easily". The report also documents a Senior Constable, Blair Smith, trying to protect victims from harassment from the investigator and from perversion of the course of justice. Blair Smith was also one of the first detectives to properly investigate a Christian brothers in Victoria, whose work in the early 1990s led to the conviction of Edward Dowlan; he said that the Christian Brothers is "run like a Mafia organisation." It was also shown that the Christian Brothers knew of abuse from Brothers but did not tell police and spent almost $1.5 Million defending paedophile Brother Robert Best, Edward Dowlan and Stephen Farrell. It was found that the Christian Brothers' St Alipius School was staffed almost entirely by paedophiles.

The royal commission's final report on Catholic Church authorities in Ballarat was released on 6 December 2017. The commission found that Bishop Mulkearns failed to take action: "Bishop Mulkearns again was derelict in his duty in failing to take any effective action to have (paedophile priest) Ridsdale referred to police and to restrict Ridsdale's contact with children". The commission pointed out the structure of the diocese, culture and governance, concluding: "The most likely explanation for the conduct of Bishop Mulkearns and other senior clergy in the Diocese was that they were trying to minimise the risk of scandal and protect the reputation of the Catholic Church. The Melbourne report found that former Ballarat Diocese Bishop Peter Connors was part of a culture that practiced 'using oblique or euphemistic language in correspondence and records concerning complaints of child sexual abuse'".

The following are extracts from the conclusion of the Royal Commission into Institutional Responses to Child Sexual Abuse's report into Case Study 28 – Catholic Church authorities in Ballarat:

This case study exposed a catastrophic failure in the leadership of the Diocese and ultimately in the structure and culture of the Church over decades to effectively respond to the sexual abuse of children by its priests. That failure led to the suffering and often irreparable harm to children, their families and the wider community. That harm could have been avoided if the Church had acted in the interests of children rather than in its own interests.

Euphemistic and elliptical language was often used in correspondence and minutes to mask the true nature of the conduct discussed. There was repeated reference to 'pressures', 'strains' and unspecified 'problems'. On occasions, records were deliberately not made or kept or were destroyed.

The result of these inexcusable failures was that more children were sexually abused by Catholic clergy in the Diocese. There was a catastrophic institutional failure which resulted in many children being sexually abused. We heard about the devastating, often lifelong, consequences in the lives of those children. The welfare of children was not the primary concern of Bishop Mulkearns and other senior members of the Diocese when responding to complaints and allegation of child sexual abuse against their priests. There is no doubt it should have been.

The report on Ballarat also described the impact it had on victims. One section outlines suicide and premature death caused from the abuse. One victim said:

Newspapers don't report suicides, so the public doesn't hear about the broken families and their shattered lives, about the unseen impact of institutional child sexual abuse. Children are left behind and they don't understand why. It doesn't end when the abuse ends.

Other harms are outlined. Another victim outlines the general harm in the Ballarat community:

Such chronic sexual abuse in the Ballarat community has led to a large number of men who are not able to be productive members of society and in effect have become either emotional, social or financial burdens upon the community.

The Royal Commission's final report published on 15 December 2017 found that 139 people made a claim of child sexual abuse to the Diocese of Ballarat between 1980 and 2015 and that there were 21 alleged perpetrators identified in claims. Of the 21 alleged perpetrators 17 were priests which is 8.7% of the priests who ministered during this period. Cardinal George Pell told the Royal Commission that the concentration of offending was a "coincidence". The final report included recommendations including recommendation 16.6 through to 16.26. They include the introduction of mandatory reporting/national standards, screening candidates before and during seminary or religious formation, the introduction of voluntary celibacy for diocesan clergy, to remove the requirement to destroy documents relating to canonical criminal cases in materials of morals where the accused cleric has died or ten years have elapsed from the condemnatory sentence, amend canon law to remove the time limit (prescription) for commencement of canonical actions relating to child sexual abuse, that the bishop of the diocese should ensure that parish priests are not the employers of principals and teachers in Catholic schools, modifications to canon law, and more transparency.

Following the royal commission, The Age reported that paedophile priests in Victoria worked together to share victims and there was more organisation than previously thought.

There have been more revelations through legal proceedings that show that priests and brothers in the Ballarat diocese were sharing victims, passing on intelligence about vulnerable children and protecting each other; 140 people have made claims of child abuse against the Catholic Church in the Ballarat diocese. In Warrnambool, seven Catholic priests and Christian Brothers abused children in an almost-continuous stream of paedophile clerics employed between 1963 and 1994. The Ballarat diocese and the Christian Brothers were also exporting known paedophiles to the US under the guise of "treatment". Notorious paedophile priests Gerald Ridsdale and Paul David Ryan, who molested boys at Warrnambool, were also sent to the US between the 1970s and early 2000s. Bishop Ronald Mulkearns approved both Ryan and Ridsdale's travel to the US for treatment and study, where both are alleged to have sexually assaulted children.

=== "Loud Fence" ===
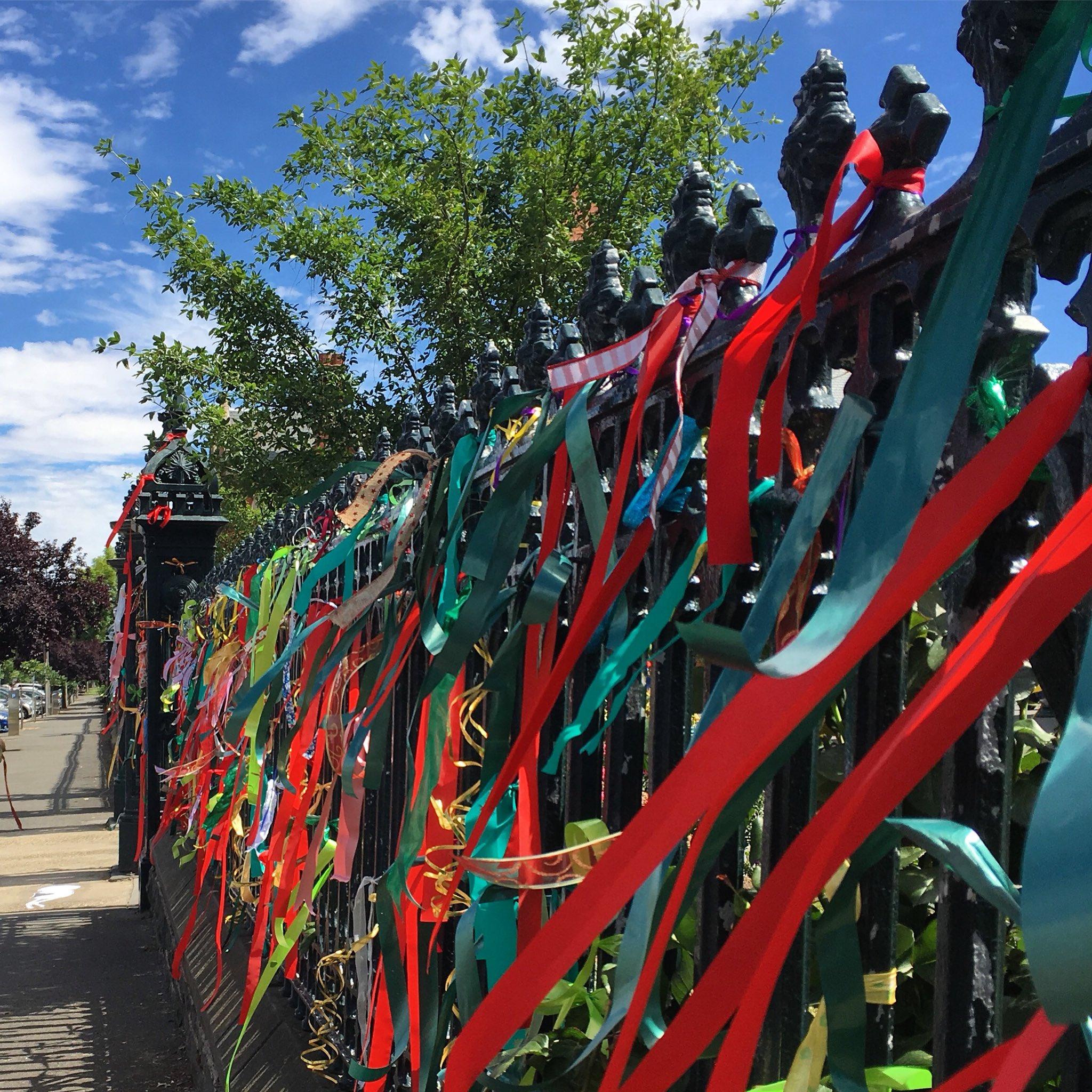
The iron fence of St Patrick's Cathedral adorned with new ribbons placed by the community after the diocese had removed the previous ones after the royal commission

A community response during the Royal Commission into Institutional Responses to Child Sexual Abuse was "Loud Fence", which was started by St Patrick's College school principal John Crowley who urged the public to tie ribbons to the school fence before the royal commission hearing commenced. He credits the idea and name to an unnamed local survivor, with another survivor coming up with the term "No more silence" in February 2014. John was the person who tied the first ribbon. By the day of the first hearing, ribbons had been tied to not only the school fence, but also to the fence of St Alipius Primary School, St Patrick's Cathedral, the entrances to Ballarat East, as well as outside the Ballarat Courts. Survivors at the hearing wore a ribbon pinned to their lapels. After the hearings had started, ribbons were taken down from St Alipius and some members of the community tied them back. One of those, Maureen Hatcher, then started a Facebook page called "Loud Fence" which is still in operation. Places that had a history of sexual abuse were marked with ribbons as a sign of support for the victims. The Loud Fence movement also spread internationally, with survivors taking it to Rome and even speaking about it at a university in Rome. There was also a Loud Fence march in Ballarat. The diocese removed the ribbons three days after the Royal Commission in to Institutional Responses to Child Sexual Abuse published its final recommendations.

=== Admitting to protecting Ridsdale and civil lawsuit ===
On 13 September 2019, the Diocese of Ballarat released a statement admitting that the high-ranking clergy in the diocese knew of sex abuse claims against Ridsdale and afterwards made efforts to shield him from prosecution. This confession came in the wake of a civil lawsuit filed against the diocese by one of Ridsdale's victims. In May 2020, it was revealed that the royal commission rejected Pell's defense that he was deceived when he was involved in a college of consultors decision to move Ridsdale from the Mortlake parish in Ballarat to Sydney in 1982 as "implausible" and that there were "at least complaints of sexual abuse of children having been made".

=== Named sexual abusers or notable cases ===
Notable sexual abuse cases include:

- Cardinal George Pell was charged with historical sexual assault offences which dated back to his time at Ballarat in the 1970s. Pell pleaded not guilty and the court set a date for his committal hearing to commence on 5 March 2018 which was expected to last four weeks. The cardinal, then considered to be the third most senior official in the Vatican, was the most senior Catholic cleric in the world to face such charges. After Pell's appeal to overturn sexual assault convictions stemming from when he was archbishop of the Roman Catholic Archdiocese of Melbourne was dismissed by the Supreme Court of Victoria, Ballarat's Bishop Paul Bird acknowledged Pell's ties to the Diocese of Ballarat and apologised. Two new sex abuse accusations against Pell, which stemmed from his time serving a Diocese of Ballarat-run orphanage in the 1970s, surfaced in 2020 as well in the television documentary series Revelation. These allegations later resulted in a new sex abuse investigation against Pell which started on 13 April 2020.
- Gerald Ridsdale, who pleaded guilty to indecently assaulting a total of 53 children by 2006 and faced further charges of sexually abusing another 12 children, being found guilty on both cases and committed to a total of 33 years in prison. Ridsdale's nephew, David Ridsdale, gave evidence before the commission that his uncle had sexually abused him from the age of 11 to 15. It was later revealed in May 2020 that Pell assisted in transferring Ridsdale to Sydney in 1982. The same month, Ridsdale had his non-parole period extended from 2022 to 2024.
- Robert Charles Best, a Christian Brother, was sentenced in the Victorian County Court for 27 offences involving the sexual abuse of 11 boys.
- Stephen Frances Farrell, a Christian Brother, sentenced in 2013 for indecently assaulting a boy while teaching at St Alipius School in Ballarat in the mid-1970s. This conviction followed a 1997 conviction on nine charges of indecently assaulting two brothers at St Alipius around the same period.
- Paul David Ryan, jailed in 2006 for 18 months after admitting three charges of indecent assault against one victim between 1990 and 1991.
- Edward Dowlan (Ted Bales) pleaded guilty to 33 counts of indecently assaulting boys under the age of 16 and one count of gross indecency between 1971 and 1986. The judge found that he had preyed on vulnerable boys as young as eight years old over a 14-year period at six different schools from the first year he became a Christian Brother in 1971. Dowlan has been jailed twice, first in 1996 for six-and-a-half years and then again in 2015.
- Peter Toomey, a Christian Brother who admitted to sexually assaulting 10 students at a Catholic high school in Melbourne in the 1970s.
- Sydney Morey.
- Terrence Pidoto was sentenced to seven years and three months, being found guilty of 11 charges including rape and indecently assaulting a child under 16. He died before facing a second trial with new charges only a year into his first sentence.
- Bryan Desmond Coffey, a priest, pleaded not guilty to charges in February 1999. He was found guilty of 12 counts of indecent assault involving eight boys and one count involving a girl, aged between six and 11 years. He was given a three-year suspended jail sentence. In 2021 Justice Forrest made a significant ruling regarding one victim of Coffey ruling that, "I can see no reason why the diocese should not be vicariously liable for such an award given that is relates directly to Coffey's conduct and is compensatory in nature."
- Leslie Sheahan, a parish priest, pleaded guilty in September 2015 to unlawful/indecent assault of a girl.
- Robert Patrick Claffey, a priest, pleaded guilty in 1998 to indecent assault of two boys aged 12 and 13 after their sister died in a road accident in 1978. In 2014, he was also charged with 16 counts of indecent assault and one count of buggery against about seven child victims between 1970 and 1992. In October, 2016, he pleaded guilty to the offences and was jailed for 18 years. On 8 May 2020, it was revealed that Claffey was still serving a prison term for the sexual abuse of 14 children between 1969 and 1992, and that at least one of his victims, Joseph Barrett had filed a lawsuit against the Diocese of Ballarat.
- John Day has been described as Australia's most prolific paedophile with more than 100 complaints about the monsignor to the church's Towards Healing program, set up to deal with allegations of abuse by the clergy. He targeted both boys and girls. The police found that he had "misconducted himself" but did not charge him, and the police officer Denis Ryan, who collected statements of abuse, lost his job. The police were involved in a cover up which have been described as the "Catholic Mafia". The Day case was detailed by Casefile True Crime Podcast - Case 34: The Catholic Mafia, aired on 24 September 2016.
- Leonard Monk.
- Peter Colley. Father Peter James Colley pleaded guilty in 1993 to two charges—one indecent assault of an adult male in a public toilet at Moonee Ponds and one charge of escaping from legal custody.
- Gerald Leo Fitzgerald, a Christian Brother. The Royal Commission into Institutional Responses to Child Sexual Abuse found that Fitzgerald was moved to new locations with continued access to children after allegations had been made. One victim described the type of behaviour of Fitzgerald to the commission: "Brother Fitzgerald was his grade 3 teacher in 1974. He said that at the end of school every Friday Brother Fitzgerald would line up his students and kiss them goodbye. He kissed some with his tongue." He died in 1987 before any charges were laid against him.
- Fr Dan Hourigan.
- Brother Kenneth Paul McGlade.
- Brother John Laidlaw, pleaded guilty to assaults on six boys, aged 12 to 17, between 1963 and 1984.

=== Accusations against Pell ===
In 2017, Pell, who served in the Roman Curia, returned to Australia from the Vatican to face sex abuse charges stemming from his time in both the Archdiocese of Melbourne and the Diocese of Ballarat. The three episode documentary program Revelation, which aired on ABC TV in March 2020, revealed two men, identified as Bernie and Peter Clarke, who accused Pell of sexually abusing them as boys when he served the Diocese of Ballarat. The alleged sexual abuse occurred when Pell spent time at the Catholic orphanage where they resided in the 1970s. The ABC also defended the accuracy of Revelation after Pell's Melbourne conviction was overturned and temporarily removed reruns of the third episode so it could be updated and eventually restored; all three episodes also remain available on ABC Radio's website. On 11 April 2020, Pell stated in an interview with Sky News journalist Andrew Bolt, which aired on Sky News Australia on 14 April 2020, that he was "ashamed" of the way the Catholic Church handled sex abuse cases and that failures to act on the abuse, which he described as "cancer", still haunted him. On 13 April 2020, police began investigating the allegations which were discussed in Revelation. On 16 April 2020, the Richmond Football Club denied Pell the right to be reinstated as the club's vice-patron and ambassador.

On 6 May 2020, the Royal Commission into Institutional Responses to Child Sexual Abuse report found that Pell knew about the abuse committed by Ridsdale. Pell had said to the commission that he "didn't do anything about it" when a young schoolboy told him that Brother Edward Dowlan was sexually abusing him, but also tried to hide the fact that it was in part his duty to assist in the investigation. These portions of the report were previously undisclosed. On 6 May 2020, newly disclosed portions of the royal commission's report found that Pell had attempted to protect Ridsdale from potential prosecution by transferring him when Pell was the vicar-general of the Diocese of Ballarat. Pell had also confessed to the Commission that "didn't do anything about it" when a young schoolboy told him that Brother Edward Dowlan was sexually abusing him, but also tried to hide the fact that it was also in part his duty to assist in the investigation.

According to the report's newly disclosed details, which were made public on 7 May 2020, by 1973 Pell was "not only conscious of child sexual abuse by clergy but that he also had considered measures of avoiding situations which might provoke gossip about it". The commission report also stated that with regards to his role in assisting in Risdale's transfer to Sydney "We are satisfied that Cardinal Pell's evidence as to the reasons that the CEO deceived him was implausible. We do not accept that Bishop Pell was deceived, intentionally or otherwise."

It was also reported that Pell, who was Ridsdale's former 1973 roommate, "tried to bribe" at least one Ridsdale victim, Ridsdale's nephew David Ridsdale, "into keeping quiet". David Ridsdale testified that the attempted bribe took place when he told Pell about the sex abuse over the phone in February 1983. He also stated that after he brought up the abuse, "[Pell] then began to talk about my growing family and my need to take care of their needs" and that "He mentioned how I would soon have to buy a car or house for my family." Hiss sisters, Patricia Ridsdale and Bernadette Lukaitis, also backed his account, telling the royal commission that their brother called them shortly after his conversation with Pell and said Pell had tried to bribe him. Despite not being satisfied with how David interpreted Pell's offer, which was believed to be mere assistance rather than an offer of silence, the royal commission accepted that Pell "turned his mind" to Ridsdale taking his boy victims on overnight camps.

=== Establishment of Institutional Liability List ===
On 8 May 2020, the Victorian Supreme Court agreed to establish an Institutional Liability List to administer child sex abuse lawsuits The new list includes claims for damages arising from the Royal Commission into Institutional Responses to Child Sexual Abuse. Lawsuits against Pell, and also cases concerning sexually abusive Diocese of Ballarat priests such as Ridsdale and Robert Claffey, played a major role in the list's creation.

== See also ==
- Roman Catholicism in Australia
