= Peter Connors =

The Most Reverend Peter Connors
- 7th Roman Catholic Bishop of Ballarat
- Church: Roman Catholic
- Diocese: Ballarat
- Appointed: 30 May 1997
- Installed: 23 July 1997
- Term ended: 1 August 2012
- Predecessor: Ronald Mulkearns
- Successor: Paul Bird
- Other post: Titular Bishop of Temuniana

Orders
- Ordination: 23 July 1961 (Priest) by Archbishop Justin Simonds
- Consecration: 21 May 1987 (Bishop) by Archbishop Frank Little

Personal details
- Born: 6 March 1937 (age 89) Mordialloc, Victoria, Australia
- Denomination: Roman Catholicism

Peter Joseph Connors (born 6 March 1937) is an Australian prelate of the Catholic Church who served as Bishop of Ballarat from 1997 to 2012.

== Biography ==
Connors was born in Mordialloc on 6 March 1937, the eldest son of Walter and Isa Connors. He received his primary education at Saint Mary’s School, Lancefield, and received his secondary education at Assumption College, Kilmore. After finishing high school, he joined Corpus Christi College, Melbourne as a student for the Archdiocese of Melbourne.

== Priesthood ==
Connors was ordained as a priest for the Archdiocese of Melbourne on 23 July 1961 at St Patrick's Cathedral, Melbourne by Archbishop Justin Daniel Simonds. During his priesthood, he served in the parishes of Frankston, Kyneton and East St Kilda. He also obtained a Doctorate in Canon Law from the Pontifical Urban University.

Returning to Melbourne in 1972, he was appointed Secretary to the Marriage Tribunal of Victoria and Tasmania. He was secretary to the Archbishop of Melbourne, Thomas Francis Little, from 1974 to 1976, then vicar-general of the Archdiocese of Melbourne until 1987.

== Episcopate ==
On 30 March 1987, Connors was appointed Auxiliary Bishop of Melbourne and Titular Bishop of Temuniana. He was consecrated on 21 May 1987 at St Patrick's Cathedral, Melbourne by Archbishop Thomas Francis Little.

On 30 May 1997, he was appointed Bishop of Ballarat, succeeding Bishop Ronald Austin Mulkearns, upon his retirement. He was installed on 23 July 1997.

He faced a heavy task upon his appointment, with several serious clerical child- abuse cases, and a consequent demoralisation of many of the clergy. Some seminarians for the Diocese were also opting to serve in the Archdiocese of Melbourne.

In 1999, a proposal to dismantle the historic marble high altar in St Patrick's Cathedral was met with public backlash. The plan was scrapped and instead, a new marble altar was installed to replace the temporary altar table, originally put in place in the 1970s.

In 2011, when Australian Senator Nick Xenophon called for legislation mandating priests to reveal cases of child sex abuse disclosed in confession, Connors responded by saying the legislation would be ineffective. He said there was no way any priest would betray the seal, an act for which the penalty under Church law is automatic excommunication. "I would like to think parliamentarians would respect the law of the Church on this matter," he said. "If priests were required to report these things, the seal of confession would be broken."

== Retirement ==
Pope Benedict XVI accepted his resignation on 1 August 2012, not long after he reached the standard retirement age of 75. His retirement was described as "early" because he had anticipated that the search for his successor would require him to remain bishop for another year.

In 2013, he had also told the Commission that his predecessor in Ballarat, Bishop Ronald Mulkearns, had shown great naivety in moving priests from one parish to another when they were known to have abused children.

In 2015, Connors admitted to the Royal Commission into Institutional Responses to Child Sexual Abuse that he had failed to respond to reports of sexual abuse while Vicar General and Auxiliary Bishop, and that there was no excuse for failing to escalate complaints and allegations against priests under his charge. The royal commission confirmed that an early leaked police report, written by Ballarat Detective Kevin Carson, said the church seemed to have known about high rates of suicides linked to abuse by convicted child sex offenders Brother Robert Charles Best and Father Gerald Ridsdale, and others, but had remained silent.

A wing at Damascus College, constructed in 2012 for year 9 and 10 students, was named after Connors. This naming is now under review by the school following the findings from the Royal Commission.

== See also ==
- Catholic Church in Australia

Catholic Church titles
Preceded by Ronald Mulkearns	7th Catholic Bishop of Ballarat; 1997–2012	Succeeded by Paul Bird
