= James Moore (bishop) =

Roman Catholic Bishop of Ballarat (1834–1904)

- Bishop of Ballarat
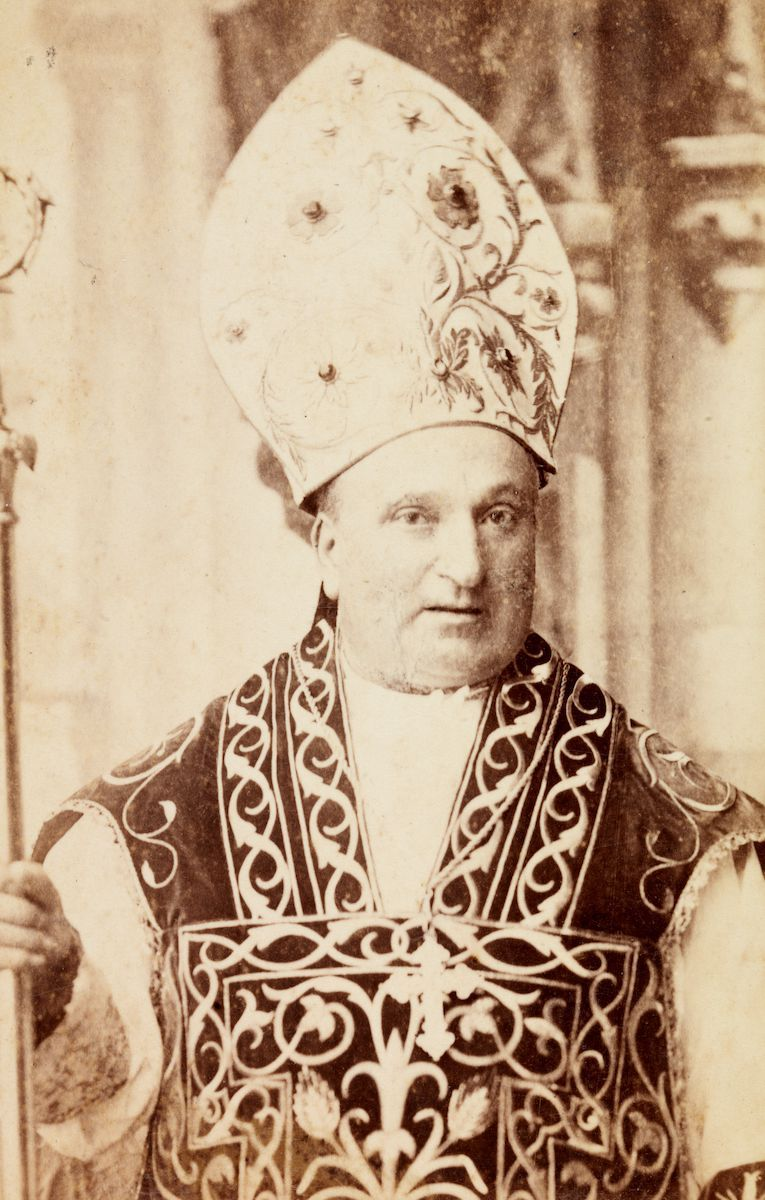
- James Moore. Photograph by Thomas Foster Chuck (c. 1888–89)
- Church: Catholic Church
- Diocese: Diocese of Ballarat
- In office: 22 January 1884 – 26 June 1904
- Predecessor: Michael O'Connor
- Successor: Joseph Higgins

Orders
- Ordination: 27 June 1858 by John Francis Whelan
- Consecration: 27 April 1884 by James Alipius Goold

Personal details
- Born: 29 June 1834 Listowel, County Kerry, United Kingdom of Great Britain and Ireland
- Died: 26 June 1904 (aged 69)

James Moore (29 June 1834 – 26 June 1904) was a Bishop of Ballarat, Victoria (Australia).

== Early life ==
Moore was born in Listowel, County Kerry, Ireland on 29 June 1834. His uncle was a priest and guided him towards the priesthood. He studied for three years at the Collegiate School in Tralee and the undertook a six-year course at All Hallows Missionary College, Dublin. He showed little aptitude for studies but still graduated from his courses.

== Priesthood ==
On 27 June 1858, he was ordained a priest for the Archdiocese of Melbourne at All Hallows College, Dublin by Bishop John Francis Whelan. He volunteered as a chaplain on the Annie Wilson and made his way to Melbourne. He began as a curate at St Francis' Church, Melbourne but was soon promoted to parish priest due to his zeal. In 1962, due to ill-health, he was giving a roving commission by Bishop James Alipius Goold to collect money for the Cathedral. Within six months, he had shown a great talent for collecting funds.

When Laurence Sheil was appointed Bishop of Adelaide in 1866, Moore succeeded him as head of the Ballarat Mission in Victoria, being appointed dean in 1869. In Ballarat, he soon realised there were too few churches for the growing population and sought to prioritise building churches, schools and societies in the region. Soon, he had paid off the debts of St Patrick's and built a new church in Ballarat East.

In 1873, he travelled with Bishop Goold to Rome, to help make arrangements for a new diocese in the Ballarat region. The Diocese of Ballarat was erected on 30 March 1874 and Michael O'Connor was named its first bishop.

Moore received an honorary Doctorate of Divinity from Pope Pius IX and became vicar-general and business manager and of the new diocese. In 1882, he was conferred the title of Monsignor and appointed a Domestic Prelate of Pope Leo XIII. The same year, he began to experience some challenge with his health and travelled to New South Wales for a short break.

Following the death of Bishop O'Connor on 14 February 1883, Moore was named administrator of the Diocese of Ballarat.

== Episcopate ==
On 22 January 1884, Moore was appointed Bishop of Ballarat by Pope Leo XIII. He was consecrated on 27 April 1884 at St Patrick's Cathedral, Ballarat by Archbishop James Alipius Goold.

He was a strong figure in the life of the Diocese as bishop. He was reportedly quick-tempered, vigilant, ruthless and was feared by his priests. He made several canonical visitations to his parishes and relished confirmations as an opportunity for homilies. He was also a resolute builder, building Nazareth House for orphans and the aged, while also raising money to clear the Cathedral's debts.

St Patrick's Cathedral, Ballarat was formally consecrated under his watch. Cardinal Francis Moran consecrated the Cathedral in 1891. The church had been made using a design originally intended for St Patrick's Cathedral, Melbourne. The high altar was made in Rome and cost ₤1,300.

He also grew the number of priests and religious in the Diocese, zealously recruiting a number of priests from Ireland to serve in the Diocese, doubling the number from 27 to 54. He also brought Redemptorists and Brigidine Sisters to the Diocese. He also invested heavily in education, and by 1904, there were 11 boarding schools, 13 high schools for both girls and boys, and 60 primary schools in 35 parishes, in the diocese.

Marian College in Ararat was founded in 1889 by five Brigidine Sisters from Ireland. They arrived in November 1888 and St Mary's Primary School opened in 1889 with a school roll of 60. The sisters had been requested by Moore.

== Death ==
In early 1904, Moore began suffering from a serious illness although it was only in June that it was discovered he was suffering with diabetes. On Saturday, 25 June 1904, Moore took a turn and appeared to be headed towards death. Archbishop Thomas Joseph Carr came to be by his side. Moore died suddenly on 26 June 1904. His body lay in state at the Bishop's Palace in Wendouree until 30 June, when it was taken to St Patrick's Cathedral, Ballarat for his Requiem Mass. He was buried in the crypt of the Cathedral.
