= Daniel Foley (bishop) =

Irish-born Australian Catholic bishop (1865–1941)

The Most Reverend Daniel Foley
- Bishop of Diocese of Ballarat
- Diocese: Ballarat
- Installed: 24 August 1916
- Term ended: 31 October 1941
- Predecessor: Joseph Higgins
- Successor: James Patrick O'Collins

Orders
- Ordination: 8 December 1889 at St Patrick's College Chapel, Maynooth by James Francis Corbett
- Consecration: 24 August 1916 at St Francis Xavier's Cathedral, Adelaide by Thomas Joseph Carr

Personal details
- Born: Daniel Foley; 25 January 1865 Ballyhea, County Cork, Ireland
- Died: 31 October 1941 (aged 76) Ballarat, Victoria, Australia
- Buried: St Patrick's Cathedral, Ballarat
- Denomination: Catholic Church
- Occupation: Catholic bishop
- Education: St Patrick's College, Maynooth
- Motto: In deo spes mea (My hope is in God)

Daniel Foley (25 January 1865 – 31 October 1941) was an Irish-born Australian bishop of the Catholic Church. He served as Bishop of Ballarat for 25 years through the early 20th century.

== Early life ==
Foley was born in Ballyhea, County Cork to Maurice and Elizabeth Foley. He was first cousin of the future Archbishop Daniel Mannix of Melbourne. Foley's mother Elizabeth was sisters with Mannix's mother Ellen. He was educated at Mount Melleray Abbey and then at St Colman's College, Fermoy before beginning studies for the priesthood at St Patrick's College, Maynooth.

== Priesthood ==
Foley was ordained to the priesthood on 8 December 1889 as a priest for the Diocese of Cloyne.

In 1890 he came to Ballarat with Bishop James Moore, Bishop of Ballarat, who had travelled to Ireland to recruit priests for the Diocese of Ballarat.

For seven years prior to his elevation to the episcopate, he served in the parish of Terang.

== Episcopate ==
On 28 April 1916, Foley was appointed Bishop of Ballarat following the death of Joseph Higgins in September 1915. He was consecrated as a bishop on 24 August 1916 at St Francis Xavier's Cathedral, Adelaide by Archbishop Thomas Joseph Carr of Melbourne.

During his episcopate, he erected many new schools including the Brigidine Convent School, Horsham.

He also erected new parishes in Beech Forest, Landsborough, Cororooke, Harrow, Donald, Hopetoun, Coleraine, Manangatang and Werrimull. He also helped the Sisters of St Joseph of the Sacred Heart establish a foundation in Swan Hill.

During his episcopate, he ordained more than 70 men to the priesthood including many from the Congregation of the Most Holy Redeemer who had a large monastery in Ballarat. Foley opened the monastery's house of studies in 1933.

== Death ==
Foley died on 31 October 1941 at Koroit, Victoria. He had been in poor health for some time.

His body was buried in the north precept of St Patrick's Cathedral, Ballarat where his three predecessors were buried.

In his will, he bequeathed money to St John of God Ballarat Hospital and two orphanages. It was said that his estate had been comparatively small due to the generous benefactions he had made throughout his 25 year episcopate.

Catholic Church titles
Preceded by Joseph Higgins	Bishop of Ballarat; 1916–1941	Succeeded by James Patrick O'Collins
