= Brian Finnigan =

Australian priest (born 1938)

The Most Reverend Brian Finnigan
- Auxiliary Bishop Emeritus of the Roman Catholic Archdiocese of Brisbane
- Diocese: Brisbane
- Appointed: 31 January 2002
- Installed: 8 April 2002
- Term ended: 30 December 2015

Orders
- Ordination: 23 May 1970 by Archbishop James O'Collins
- Consecration: 8 April 2002 by Archbishop John Bathersby

Personal details
- Born: Brian Vincent Finnigan; 28 August 1938 (age 88) Port Fairy, Australia
- Denomination: Roman Catholic
- Education: Corpus Christi College
- Motto: Come, Follow Me

Styles of Brian Finnigan
- Reference style: The Most Reverend
- Spoken style: My Lord
- Religious style: Bishop

Brian Finnigan (born 28 August 1938) is the auxiliary bishop emeritus of the Roman Catholic Archdiocese of Brisbane. He retired as auxiliary bishop on 30 December 2015 amid accusations he was not honest when giving evidence before the Royal Commission into Institutional Responses to Child Sexual Abuse. He was consecrated by Archbishop John Bathersby on 8 April 2002.

== Early life ==
Finnigan was born on 28 August 1938 to John Finnigan and Elizabeth (née Russell), and was the youngest of 12 children. He was educated at Toolong State School and received his secondary education at St Patrick's College, Ballarat. He entered Corpus Christi College, Werribee in 1963.

== Priesthood ==
Finnigan was ordained a priest in the Diocese of Ballarat on 23 May 1970 by Bishop James O'Collins at the picture theatre in Port Fairy. He was appointed to Warrnambool parish as assistant priest in 1970 before being assigned to Portland parish in 1971. In 1974, he was appointed to be assistant priest of St Patrick's Cathedral, Ballarat. He became secretary to Bishop Ronald Mulkearns in 1979.

He was appointed administrator of St Patrick's Cathedral, Ballarat in 1985. He became parish priest of Warrnambool in 1990 before being appointed to Sebastopol in 1991, where he served until 1997. He also became vicar general of the Diocese of Ballarat in 1991.

In 1977, he studied a Masters of Church Administration at Catholic University of America and obtained a Licentiate in Canon Law and Master in Canon Law from Saint Paul University, Ottawa, Canada in 1991. He was appointed secretary of the Australian Catholic Bishops' Conference in 1998.

== Episcopacy ==
On 31 January 2002, Pope John Paul II announced Finnigan would be appointed Auxiliary Bishop of Brisbane. He was appointed to the titular see of Rapidum. He was consecrated on 8 April 2002 by Archbishop John Bathersby.

=== Apostolic Administrator of Toowoomba ===
On 2 May 2011, Finnigan was appointed to serve as apostolic administrator of the Diocese of Toowoomba, following the removal of Bishop William Morris by the Holy See. He served in this role until the appointed of Robert McGuckin as Bishop of Toowoomba on 14 May 2012.

=== Sexual Abuse Royal Commission ===
In 2015, Finnigan appeared before the Royal Commission into Institutional Responses to Child Sexual Abuse. Follow his appearance, he was accused by counsel assisting the Royal Commission, Angus Stewart SC of lacking compassion and not being candid in his evidence about his knowledge of paedophile priests in the 1980s. Finnigan was secretary to Bishop of Ballarat Ronald Mulkearns when the now laicised priest and sex offender Gerald Ridsdale was offending within the Diocese and being transferred between parishes by Bishop Mulkearns.

During his appearance before the commission, Finnigan said the Church should adopt a one-strike policy on child abuse.

Following his appearance at the commission, Finnigan's resignation, which was tendered two years early upon reaching the age of 75, was accepted by Pope Francis on 30 December 2015. A petition had called upon Brisbane Archbishop Mark Coleridge to sack him if he did not stand down.

Catholic Church titles
Preceded by Mieczyslaw Jaworski	— TITULAR — Titular Bishop of Rapidum; 2019–present	Incumbent
Preceded by	Auxiliary Bishop of Brisbane; 2002–2015	
