= Michael O'Connor (Australian bishop) =

Australian Catholic bishop (1829–1883)

- Bishop of Ballarat
- Church: Catholic Church
- Diocese: Diocese of Ballarat
- In office: 24 April 1874 – 14 February 1883
- Predecessor: Diocese erected
- Successor: James Moore

Orders
- Ordination: 10 June 1854 by Paul Cullen
- Consecration: 17 May 1874 by Alessandro Franchi

Personal details
- Born: 4 October 1829 Dublin, United Kingdom of Great Britain and Ireland
- Died: 14 February 1883 (aged 53)

Michael O'Connor (4 October 1829 – 14 February 1883) was the first Catholic Bishop of Ballarat, located in Victoria, Australia.

== Early life ==
O'Connor was born in Dublin, Ireland, the son of John O'Connor and his wife Mary. In 1945, he entered Maynooth. In his third year, he won first prize in his class of 70 and was promoted to Dunboyne Establishment, a postgraduate house of study for priest-students located at Maynooth. So strong was his repute for integrity and scholarship, he took the chair of moral theology while a professor was ill.

== Priesthood ==
O'Connor was ordained a priest for the Diocese of Meath on 10 June 1854 by Archbishop Paul Cullen.

He was shortly after given charge of the parish of Rathfarnham, Dublin, an important parish in the Archdiocese of Dublin. He excelled in his time in charge of this parish, finding great favour with Archbishop Cullen, who had an influential role in establishing the episcopacy in Australia at the time.

== Episcopate ==
On 30 March 1874, the Diocese of Ballarat was erected from territory belonging to the Diocese of Melbourne (which was then elevated to an Archdiocese). On 24 April 1874, O'Connor was appointed its first bishop by Pope Pius IX. He was consecrated on 17 May 1874 in the Palazzo di Propaganda Fide Chapel by Cardinal Alessandro Franchi.

O'Connor arrived in the Diocese of Ballarat on 17 December 1874. He was formally installed on 20 December 1874 at St Patrick's Cathedral, Ballarat by Archbishop James Alipius Goold on 20 November.

He immediately set about building up the new Diocese. He oversaw the building of 40 churches and schools in the region. He founded the parishes of Casterton, Linton, Clunes, Stawell, Horsham and St Arnaud. He also invited various religious order to begin ministering in the Diocese. In 1875, he invited the Sisters of Loreto from Rathfarnham to make a foundation in Ballarat. In 1876, the Christian Brothers came to Ballarat and established schools. The Sisters of Mercy also came to the Diocese in 1881. He also built the Bishop's Palace near Lake Wendouree.

On 2 March 1881, he left Ballarat for Rome and then returned to his native Ireland, visiting the seminaries to arrange for new, young priests for the Diocese of Ballarat. He returned to Ballarat in October 1882, after a nearly two year absence.

On 11 February 1883, he suddenly became ill following a haemorrhage of his lungs. He was given the sacrament of extreme unction. He died on 14 February 1883.
