= Mary Gonzaga Barry =

(1834–1915) mother superior

The Reverend Mother Mary Gonzaga Barry IBVM
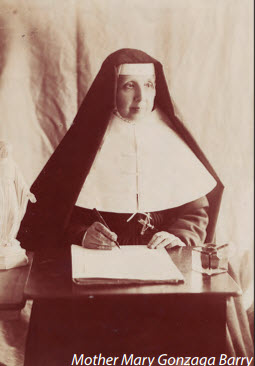

Religious sister, foundress and educator
- Born: 27 July 1834; Wexford, Ireland
- Died: 15 March 1915 (aged 80); Ballarat, Australia
- Feast: 15 March

Mary "Gonzaga" Barry IBVM (27 July 1834 – 15 March 1915) was an Irish Catholic religious sister whose life work led to the establishment of Loreto Sister schools across Australia.

== Biography ==
Mary Barry was born in Wexford, Ireland, to John Barry and his wife Elizabeth. Through Mary's childhood, Ireland was experiencing the Great Famine. Despite this, Mary was educated by the Loreto Sisters in Ireland before entering the I.B.V.M in 1853, at the age of 19.

In 1875, the first Loreto Sisters, led by Gonzaga Barry travelled from Ireland to Australia and at the request of Michael O'Connor, the Bishop of Ballarat, agreed to establish Catholic schools for girls. Despite her initial issues, such as her age and mild deafness, these Loreto Sisters established a school in Ballarat shortly after arriving in Australia which was run by Mother Gonzaga and the I.B.V.M. This first school founded was St Mary's Mount Abbey.

Mary Gonzaga Barry died on 5 March 1915, at Loreto Abbey in Ballarat, Australia. In her obituary she was described as "a woman of bright intellect ... [with] exceptional talent for the transaction of business affairs." One of Mother Barry’s dreams was to build a Chapel at the Loreto Convent, Ballarat.

== Significant works ==
The Bishop of Ballarat was concerned about the educational needs of the growing population of the Ballarat area.

After Mary and her seven companions arrived in Ballarat in 1875, and after battling her initial problems, I.B.V.M schools were soon running in the local Ballarat area. These schools met a variety of needs in the area; prep for UNI entrance, theological education, unique Kindergarten facilities, free parish-based education for those who could not pay fees and were modelled on what Mother Gonzaga called "a sensible school for girls". As Gonzaga Barry's schools became more well-known, she was well-respected in the Australian education world for her major contributions and establishment of the schools. Barry's value of the importance of holistic education was reflected in the organisation and values of her schools.

As well as primary and secondary schools, Gonzaga Barry and the I.B.V.M sisters established a free-of-charge kindergarten in South Melbourne (1912) and a teachers' college (Central Catholic Training College) to prepare both religious and lay staff which opened in 1906. The basis for Mother Gonzaga Barry's works and establishments came from her belief that women had much to learn rather than relying on "the theories of education ... which we owe largely to men." She invited Barbara Bell, a Cambridge graduate, to come to Ballarat to instruct the Loreto sisters in new methods of teaching in the newly-established college of teacher education. Barry also had a profound impact on her students urging them to make their own mark in the world, by not settling for the stereotypes of women. Currently, there are seven Loreto schools in Australia and over 90 in the wider world.

In 1978 a street in the Canberra suburb of Chisholm was named Gonzaga Place in her honour. She was inducted onto the Victorian Honour Roll of Women in 2025.
