= Barbara Bell =

Barbara Bell may refer to:

- Barbara Bell (educationalist) (1870–1957), Australian Catholic educationalist
- Barbara Bell (astronomer) (1922–2017), American astronomer
