= James O'Collins =

Australian Roman Catholic bishop

The Most Reverend Sir James O'Collins KBE
- 5th Roman Catholic Bishop of Ballarat
- Church: Roman Catholic
- Diocese: Ballarat
- Installed: 23 December 1941
- Term ended: 1 May 1971
- Predecessor: Daniel Foley
- Successor: Ronald Austin Mulkearns
- Previous post: Bishop of Geraldton

Orders
- Ordination: 23 December 1922 at Rome by Giuseppe Palica
- Consecration: 11 February 1930 at St Patrick's Cathedral, Melbourne by Daniel Mannix

Personal details
- Born: James Patrick O'Collins; 31 March 1892 Port Melbourne, Victoria
- Died: 25 November 1983 (aged 91)
- Denomination: Roman Catholicism
- Occupation: Roman Catholic bishop
- Profession: Cleric
- Education: Pontificio Collegio Urbano de Propaganda Fide

Sir James Patrick O'Collins KBE (31 March 1892 − 25 November 1983), an Australian suffragan bishop, was the fifth Bishop of the Roman Catholic Diocese of Ballarat, serving for over 29 years.

== Early life ==
O'Collins was born on 31 March 1892. He was the second of eight children born to Irish migrants Patrick James O’Collins and his wife Ellen Mary. His youngest sister Elizabeth Anna died after just 14 days. An avid sportsman, he played football and cricket.

He completed his studies at Hassett’s Coaching College in 1917. He entered St Columba's College, Springwood in 1918 and then studied at the Pontificio Collegio Urbano de Propaganda Fide in Rome. While at the college, he became Prefect of the Junior Camerata of the college and later Prefect of the Senior Camerata. He was also president of the Newman Debating Society in Rome too.

Another of his brothers, Michael, also studied in Rome with him and was ordained a priest for the Missionary Society of St. Columban in 1924. Two of his younger sisters became Brigidine Sisters: Alice (Mother Mary Dorothea) and Mary Margaret (Mother Imelda). One of his brothers, Patrick Francis, was a prominent lawyer in Melbourne.

== Priesthood ==
On 23 December 1922, O'Collins was ordained a priest for the Archdiocese of Melbourne in Rome by Archbishop Giuseppe Palica. He was ordained alongside Matthew Beovich, who would become the Archbishop of Adelaide. He remained in Rome for a further six months to complete his studies.

He returned to Melbourne in November 1923, having travelled back via the United States and China. His first appointed was as an assistant priest at Yarraville before being transferred to East Brunswick in 1927. He also served as diocesan spiritual director of the Catholic Young Men's Society. He took charge of the East Brunswick during a period of illness for the parish priest.

== Episcopate ==
=== Geraldton ===
On 11 February 1930, O'Collins was appointed Bishop of Geraldton by Pope Pius XI, despite still being only an assistant priest at Brunswick East. His election may have been a result of the strong impression he left on superiors while serving in Rome. He was on friendly and familiar terms with many Cardinals and destined Cardinals, including Camillo Laurenti and Willem Marinus van Rossum, who both held influential positions in the Roman Curia.

He was consecrated a bishop in St Patrick's Cathedral, Melbourne on 11 May 1930 by Archbishop Daniel Mannix, at the age of 38. He arrived in Western Australia on 23 June 1930 and arrived in Geraldton by train on 27 June 1930.

He expanded the diocese and doubled the number of parishes. He also completed work on the St Francis Xavier's Cathedral, Geraldton, completing the third and final phase of the 22 year construction on 28 August 1938.

=== Ballarat ===
On 23 December 1941, O'Collins was appointed Bishop of Ballarat, following the death of Bishop Daniel Foley a few months earlier. He left Geraldton in March 1942.

He was enthroned at Bishop of Ballarat 19 April 1942 at St Patrick's Cathedral, Ballarat by Archbishop Daniel Mannix.

Following World War II, many new migrants arrived in Australia and settled within the Diocese of Ballarat, necessitating the establishment of new schools and parishes. The Missionaries of the Sacred Heart established Monivae College in Hamilton in 1947 and the Apollo Bay parish was founded in 1949. During the 1950s, the parishes of Edenhope, Red Cliffs, Wycheproof, Cressy, Timboon and Robinvale were founded. During the 1960s, the parishes of Sebastopol, Wendouree, Dennington and Merbein were established.

O'Collins was a supporter of B. A. Santamaria who operated a political organisation in Australia called "The Movement". Along with Archbishop Daniel Mannix and Archbishop Norman Gilroy, he formed a committee to control The Movement.

On 5 September 1968, Ronald Austin Mulkearns was appointed Coadjutor Bishop of Ballarat to assist O'Collins, who was then 76 years old.

== Retirement ==
On 1 May 1971, O'Collins retired as Bishop of Ballarat and was succeeded by Mulkearns.

He was appointed a Knight Commander of the Order of the British Empire (KBE) in 1980 for services to religion and the community. He was also appointed to the Order of Polonia Restituta in 1978.

In 1982, when O'Collins was nearing 90, the future Cardinal, George Pell, moved into his house to live with him and care for him.

On 25 November 1983, O'Collins died in Ballarat at the age of 91. He was buried in the crypt of St Patrick's Cathedral, Ballarat.

The Royal Commission into Institutional Responses to Child Sexual Abuse found that O'Collins had received a complaint in the 1960s that Father Gerald Ridsdale had sexually abused a boy but O’Collins had not taken action.

== See also ==
- Catholic Church in Australia

Catholic Church titles
Preceded by Richard Ryan	3rd Catholic Bishop of Geraldton; 1930–1941	Succeeded by Alfred Gummer
Preceded by Daniel Foley	5th Catholic Bishop of Ballarat; 1941–1971	Succeeded by Ronald Mulkearns
