= Joseph Higgins (bishop) =

Australian Latin Catholic bishop (died 1915)

- Bishop of Ballarat
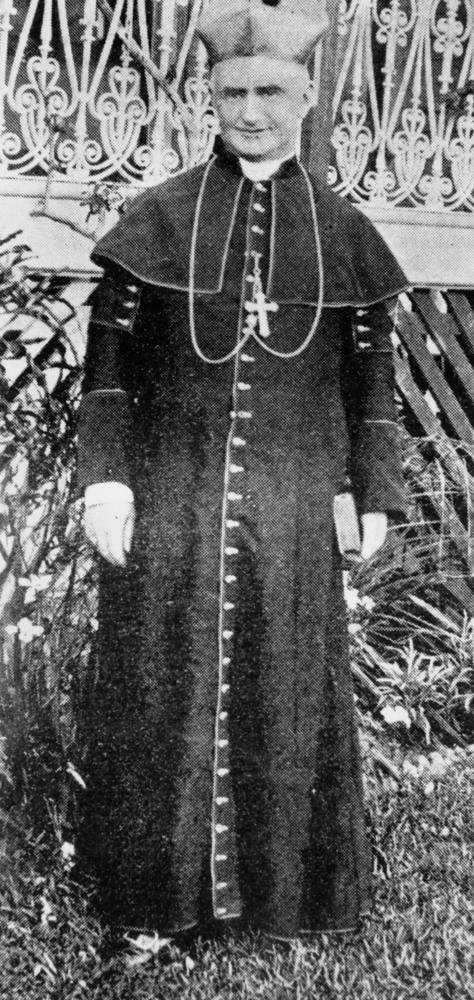
- Church: Catholic Church
- Diocese: Diocese of Ballarat
- In office: 3 March 1905 – 16 September 1915
- Predecessor: James Moore
- Successor: Daniel Foley
- Previous posts: Bishop of Rockhampton (1899-1905); Titular Bishop of Antiphellus (1888-1899); Auxiliary Bishop of Sydney (1888-1899)

Orders
- Ordination: 29 May 1863
- Consecration: 31 March 1889 by William Walsh

Personal details
- Born: 13 January 1838 Moyvore (northwest of Glencara), County Westmeath, United Kingdom of Great Britain and Ireland
- Died: 16 September 1915 (aged 77) Ballarat, Victoria, Australia, British Empire

Joseph Higgins (13 January 1838 – 16 September 1915) was an Irish-born Catholic bishop in Australia. He was the Bishop of Rockhampton in Queensland and the Bishop of Ballarat in Victoria.

== Early life ==
Joseph Higgins was born in 1838 in County Westmeath, Ireland. He was educated at St Finian's Seminary, Navan.

== Religious life ==
Higgins attended St Patrick's College, Maynooth where he was ordained in 1863. He served as President of St. Finnian's in Navan from 1867 until 1884 before becoming parish priest in Castletown.

On 4 May 1899, he was appointed Bishop of Rockhampton, where he completed the cathedral, built 19 churches and established 10 schools, 8 institutions for lay women, and 2 communities of nuns.

In May 1904, he suffered a "slight" paralytic stroke.

On 3 March 1905, aged 67 years, he became the Bishop of Ballarat, succeeding Dr James Moore.

== Later life ==
Higgins died at the Bishop's Palace at Ballarat on 16 September 1915, having been ill with bronchial and heart troubles for some months prior.

Catholic Church titles
Preceded by John Cani	2nd Roman Catholic Bishop of Rockhampton; 1899–1905	Succeeded by James Duhig
