= Barbara Bell (educationalist) =

Catholic religious sister and educationist (1870–1957)

Personal life
- Born: 26 July 1870 Dublin, Ireland
- Died: 18 September 1957 (aged 87) Remuera, New Zealand

Religious life
- Religion: Roman Catholicism

Barbara Bell (26 July 1870 – 18 September 1957), was a Catholic educationalist and later a religious sister who made a significant contribution to teacher training in Australia.

== Early life and family ==
Barbara Bell was born in Dublin, Ireland on 26 July 1870. She was the third child of Hamilton Bell and his wife, Bridget (née Funcheon) Bell. Her father was a well-known teacher and a member of the Irish National Council of Education. Siblings included a brother and a sister Mary Bridget (1874–1946), known as Molly, who was also an educationalist and later joined the Institute of the Blessed Virgin Mary at Loreto Abbey in Ballarat, Victoria.

== Education and career ==
Bell was educated by the Dominican nuns in Dublin and later in Belgium. She taught with the Ursuline sisters in Holland and in 1895 obtained a teaching diploma from Cambridge. She was invited by Mother Mary Gonzaga Barry to come to Australia to instruct the Loreto Sisters in Ballarat in new methods of teaching and to establish a college of teacher education. Mother Gonzaga Barry oversaw the development of Australia's first Catholic teacher training in 1884 and in 1906 the order turned the Loreto Convent at Albert Park in Victoria into a teachers’ training institution, the Central Catholic Training College.

Her services extended to many other schools and convents in addition to those run by the Loreto sisters. Bishop Delaney invited her to Tasmania in 1899 where she worked with the Sisters of Mercy. She also travelled to New Zealand where she assisted the sisters of the Faithful Companions of Jesus (FCJ) in New Zealand.

Bell advised Archbishop Thomas Carr on Catholic schooling in the Melbourne diocese. She provided teacher training for the Sisters of Mercy, the Presentation Sisters, and the Faithful Companions of Jesus in various convents around the state of Victoria. From 1905 to 1909, she was mistress of studies at the new Central Catholic Training College, with Mother Mary Hilda Benson as founding principal. Bell by this time had been appointed a member of the board of examiners of the first Victorian Teachers’ Registration Committee.

Early in 1913, Bell joined the Religious of the Sacred Heart in Sydney. In the same year she returned to Ireland, visiting her family and continuing her novitiate at Roehampton, England. She later taught at Timaru in New Zealand and at Elizabeth Bay in Sydney, where she was responsible for the teacher-training of young nuns. Subsequently, Bell returned to Timaru, moving in 1935 to Wellington, and, in 1947, to Auckland.

== Death and legacy ==
Bell died on 18 September 1957 at Remuera in New Zealand. She had made a significant contribution to the training of Catholic female teachers over many decades, introducing new developments in the theory and practice of education.
