= Thomas Carr (archbishop of Melbourne) =

Catholic archbishop of Melbourne, Victoria, Australia

The Most Reverend Thomas Carr
- 2nd Archbishop of Melbourne
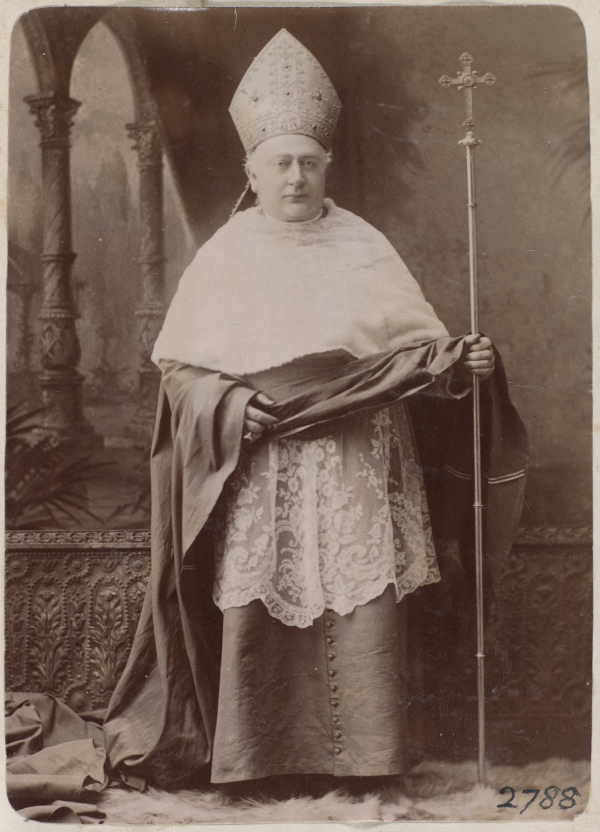
- Archbishop Carr
- Church: Roman Catholic Church
- Archdiocese: Melbourne
- Installed: 16 November 1886
- Term ended: 6 May 1917
- Predecessor: James Goold
- Successor: Daniel Mannix
- Other post: Bishop of the Armed Services (1912–1917)
- Previous posts: Bishop of Galway, Ireland

Orders
- Ordination: 22 May 1866 (Priest) in St Patrick's College, Maynooth
- Consecration: 26 August 1883 (Bishop) by Archbishop John MacEvilly

Personal details
- Born: Thomas Joseph Carr; 10 May 1839 Moylough, Galway, Ireland
- Died: 6 May 1917 (aged 77) Melbourne, Victoria, Australia
- Buried: St Patrick's Cathedral, Melbourne
- Denomination: Roman Catholic
- Profession: Prelate

Styles of Thomas Joseph Carr
- Reference style: The Most Reverend
- Spoken style: Your Grace
- Religious style: Archbishop

Thomas Joseph Carr (10 May 1839 – 6 May 1917) was the second Roman Catholic archbishop of Melbourne, Australia. As archbishop, he was a strong advocate for education and oversaw a huge growth in Catholic education. He also oversaw the completion of St Patrick's Cathedral, which had been underdevelopment for over 30 years.

== Early life and education ==
Carr was born on 10 May 1839 near Moylough, Galway, Ireland. He attended St Jarlath's College, Tuam and St Patrick's College, Maynooth, where he was ordained as a priest on 19 May 1866.

== Career ==
He served as a curate for six years.

Carr taught at St Jarlath's College and St Patrick's College. In 1874, he became dean of postgraduate students at St Patrick's College. In 1880, he became vice-president of the school. The same year, he was also made the editor of the Irish Ecclesiastical Record, a position he held until 1883.

In 1883, Carr was appointed bishop of Galway. In September 1886, he was appointed Archbishop of Melbourne following the death of Archbishop James Goold. Carr moved to Melbourne in June 1887.

As archbishop, he was a strong advocate for education and oversaw a huge growth in Catholic education. He also oversaw the completion of St Patrick's Cathedral, which had been underdevelopment for over 30 years.

In 1899, he became editor of Austral Light. In 1913, Daniel Mannix was appointed Carr's coadjutor.

Carr died at Melbourne on 6 May 1917 and was buried in St Patrick's Cathedral, Melbourne. He was 78.

== Legacy ==
St. Patrick's Cathedral, Melbourne was his largest accomplishment, but there are many other markers to Carr's lasting contributions, including the parish of Werribee, Victoria, which he established in 1906.

In the south-western Melbourne suburb of Tarneit, Thomas Carr College is named in his honour.

== Works ==
Collected Writings (1907)

Preceded by James Goold	2nd Catholic Archbishop of Melbourne; 1886–1917	Succeeded by Daniel Mannix
Preceded by None	First Bishop of the Armed Services; 1912–1917	Succeeded by Daniel Mannix
