= St Patrick's Cathedral, Melbourne =

Cathedral in Victoria, Australia

Saint Patrick's Cathedral
- Cathedral Church and Minor Basilica of Saint Patrick
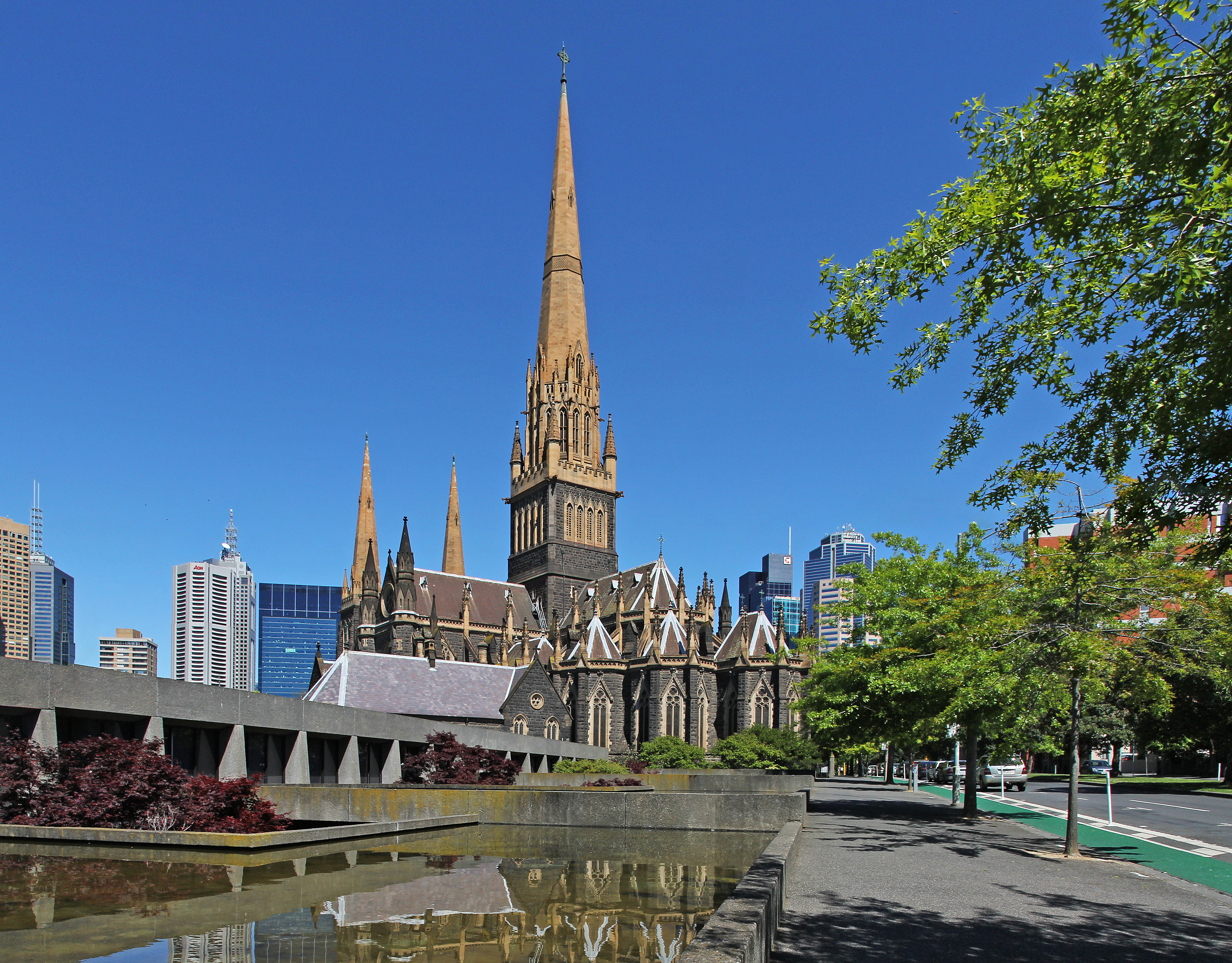
- Gothic Revival central tower of St Patrick's Cathedral
- Saint Patrick's Cathedral
- 37°48′36″S 144°58′34″E
- Address: Cathedral Place, East Melbourne, Melbourne City, Victoria
- Country: Australia
- Denomination: Catholic Church
- Sui iuris church: Latin Church
- Website: cam.org.au/cathedral

History
- Status: Cathedral, minor basilica
- Dedication: Saint Patrick
- Dedicated: 1851
- Consecrated: 1897

Architecture
- Functional status: Active
- Architect: William Wardell
- Architectural type: Cathedral
- Style: Gothic Revival
- Years built: 1858 – 1939

Specifications
- Length: 103.6 metres (340 ft)
- Width: 56.4 metres (185 ft)
- Materials: Bluestone

Administration
- Province: Melbourne
- Metropolis: Melbourne
- Archdiocese: Melbourne
- Parish: St Patrick's

Clergy
- Archbishop: Peter Comensoli
- Dean: Stuart Hall

Victorian Heritage Register
- Official name: St Patrick's Cathedral Precinct
- Type: State heritage (Monuments and Memorials, Religion)
- Designated: 9 October 1974
- Reference no.: H0008
- Heritage Overlay number: HO129

The Cathedral Basílica of Saint Patrick is a Roman Catholic cathedral in Melbourne, Victoria, Australia. It is the cathedral church of the Roman Catholic Archdiocese of Melbourne and the seat of its archbishop, currently Peter Comensoli.

Pope Paul VI raised the shrine to the status of minor basilica in 24 July 1974. Pope John Paul II visited the cathedral in 1986.

The cathedral is built on a traditional east–west axis, with the altar at the eastern end, symbolising belief in the resurrection of Christ. The plan is in the style of a Latin cross, consisting of a nave with side aisles, sacristies, transepts with side aisles and a sanctuary with seven chapels.

The cathedral was listed on the Victorian Heritage Register on 5 August 1999.

== Location ==
The cathedral is located on Eastern Hill in Melbourne in an area bounded by Albert Street, Gisborne Street, Lansdowne Street and Cathedral Place. Just to the west across Gisborne Street is St Peter's Church, constructed from 1846 to 1848, which is the Anglican parish church of Melbourne.

== History ==
In 1848, the Augustinian friar James Goold was appointed the first bishop of Melbourne and became the fourth bishop in Australia after Sydney, Hobart and Adelaide. He immediately began negotiations with the colonial government for the grant of five acres of land for a church in the Eastern Hill area, at the top of the rise looking up Bourke Street. On 1 April 1851, only 16 years after the foundation of Melbourne, the Colonial Secretary of Victoria finally granted the site to the Roman Catholic Church.

Since the Catholic community of Melbourne was at the time almost entirely Irish, the cathedral was dedicated to St Patrick, the patron saint of Ireland.

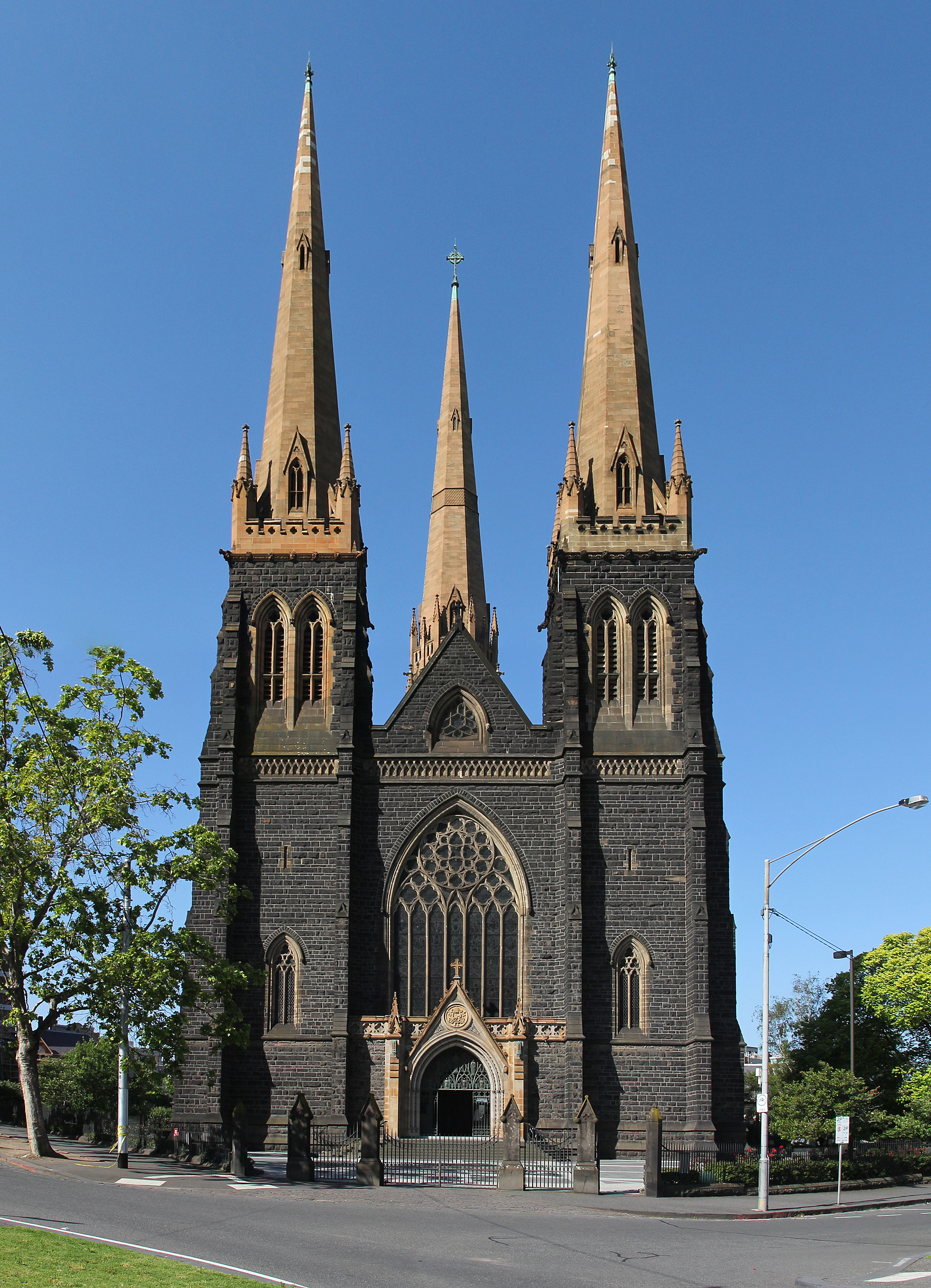
View of the main entrance to the cathedral

In 1851 a start was made, but with every able-bodied man in the colony soon rushing to the goldfields, not much was built by 1856, when Goold commissioned a larger one, using a design by Charles Hansom, and executed by George & Schneider, but only the south aisle was built by 1858. Goold then appointed the recently arrived English architect William Wardell to design a far larger one. Wardell was an accomplished architect, known especially for a series of Catholic churches in London, all in Gothic Revival style, and was part of the circle around one of the leading exponents of the Gothic for churches, Augustus Welby Pugin. He arrived in Melbourne in September 1858, and the new foundations were laid out by December. It was at first intended to incorporate the completed stonework, but in the event it was mostly replaced.

St Patrick's Cathedral draws on the Gothic style of late thirteenth century, based on the great medieval cathedrals of England. The style is specifically Geometric Decorated Gothic, showing this style at its most complex in the large west window of the nave. The eastern arm with its chevet of radiating chapels in the French manner is still principally in the English late thirteenth century style, giving the most complete essay attempted in that style during the nineteenth century. William Wardell was a remarkably ambitious and capable architect; he went on to design the second St Mary's Cathedral, Sydney, in a similar style, even larger than St Patrick's, but with a completely English square East End.

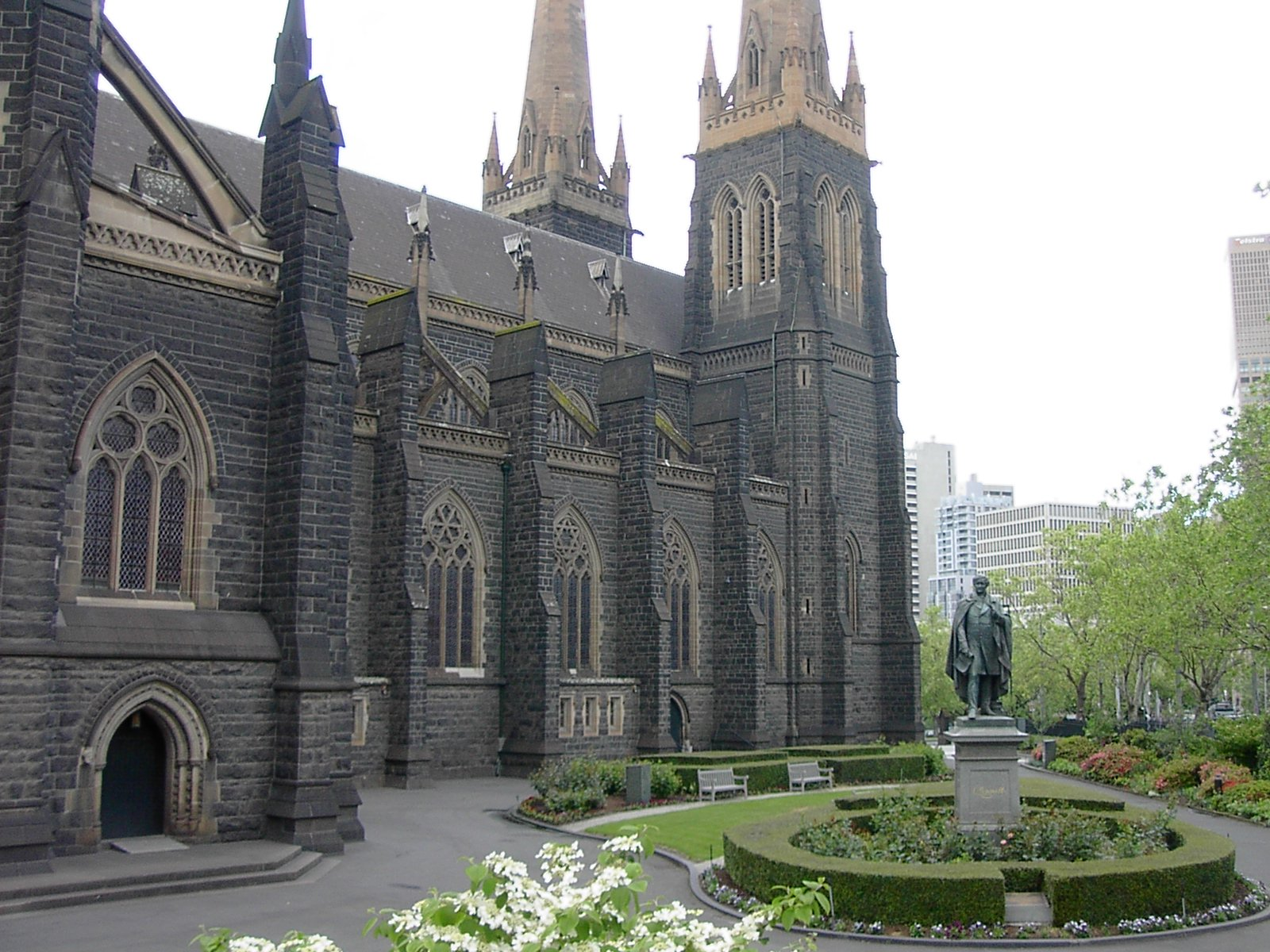
St Patrick's Cathedral, Melbourne. The statue in the foreground is of the Irish nationalist leader Daniel O'Connell

In 1974, Pope Paul VI conferred the title and dignity of minor basilica on the cathedral. In 1986, Pope John Paul II visited the cathedral and addressed clergy during his papal visit. The building also saw a green ban in the 1970s.

=== Construction ===
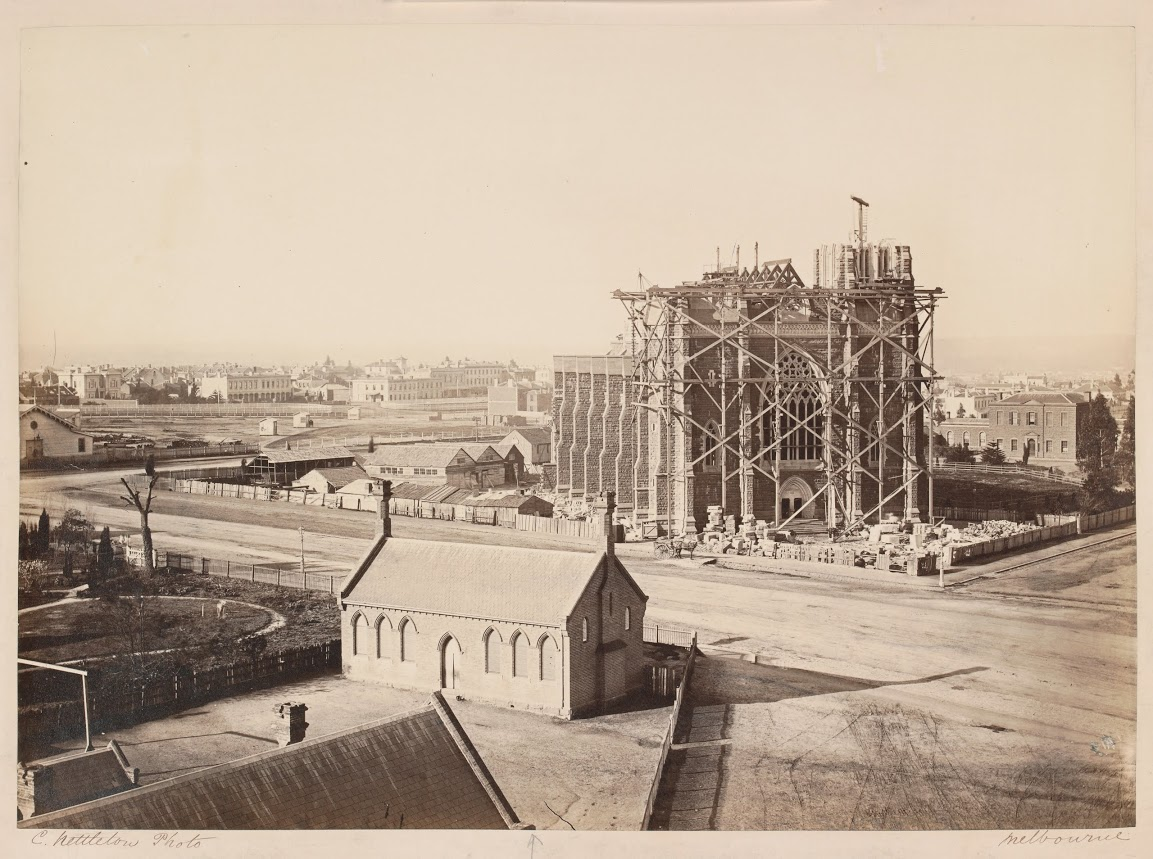
St Patrick's Cathedral with scaffolding and St Patrick's School, Eastern Hill c. 1866 State Library Victoria H2119

The nave was completed within 10 years, with the bells blessed in a grand ceremony on the 29th November 1868; with a temporary wall built at the end of the nave, services could be held. Given the size of the Catholic community at the time, the massive bluestone Gothic cathedral was an immense and very expensive undertaking, and there were long delays while further funds were raised. Construction of the sanctuary and the elaborate chapels took longer, further delayed by the severe depression which hit Melbourne in 1891. Finally, under the leadership of Archbishop Thomas Carr, the cathedral was completed except for the spires, and it was consecrated on 1st November 1897. St Patrick's is said to be was one of the two largest churches brought to substantial completion anywhere in the world in the 19th century, the other being St Patrick's Cathedral in New York.

Daniel Mannix, who became Archbishop of Melbourne in 1917, maintained a constant interest in the cathedral. An appeal to fund the spires was first launched in 1929, though construction did not start until the mid 1930s. They were built taller than Wardell's original design, and completed, along with a new front door, in 1939.

The cathedral is 103.6 metres (340 ft) long on its long axis, 56.4 metres (185 ft) wide across the transepts and 25.3 metres (83 ft) wide across the nave. The nave and transepts are 28.9 metres (95 ft) high. The central spire is 105 metres (344 ft) high and the flanking towers and spires are 61.9 metres (203 ft) high. The bluestone used in its construction was sourced from basalt deposits in nearby Footscray.

=== Restoration ===
To celebrate the centenary of its consecration in 1997, the cathedral was closed throughout 1994 to be upgraded. Nothing was added to the main building. Rather, it underwent significant conservation work, with funds contributed by the federal and Victorian governments, corporate and philanthropic donors and the community of Melbourne.

The cathedral's stained glass windows had buckled and cracked and required a full year to restore to their original state. Teams of stonemasons and stained-glass craftsmen used "lime mortars and materials long-forgotten by the building trade — like medieval times". The 1992–97 restoration works were undertaken under the guidance of Falkinger Andronas Architects and Heritage Consultants. The works were awarded the Royal Australian Institute of Architects (Victorian Chapter) John George Knight Award for Heritage Architecture 1996. One of the gargoyles restored by the masonry team was modelled on the then-Premier of Victoria, Jeff Kennett.

== Music ==
=== Cathedral choir ===
There has been music at St Patrick's since 1858, but the present cathedral choir was founded in 1939 when the Vienna Mozart Boys Choir found itself stranded in Australia at the outbreak of war. The National Museum of Australia holds a collection of the choir's memorabilia from this period. St Patrick's choir has between 50 and 60 members who are all students of St Kevin's College in Toorak, through a scholarship program from the archdiocese. The choir has made commercial recordings in the past, mainly from the 1950s to 1990s. Selected recording before the 1980s have been deposited with the National Film and Sound Archive (Screensound Australia).

=== Cathedral singers ===
Formed in May 1996, the St Patrick's Cathedral Singers supplement the musical resources of the cathedral. The choir has been directed since 2015 by Christopher Mason. The singers sing weekly at the Sunday 6:00 pm Mass. Entrance is by audition and some scholarships are available to eligible students.

=== Pipe organs ===
The cathedral's original pipe organ was built in the late 1870s by Robert Mackenzie and completed in 1880 by George Fincham. The current installation was built by George Fincham & Sons, Melbourne, in 1962–64 and incorporates a substantial part of the original. Installed in the west gallery of the cathedral, it comprises 81 speaking stops spread over four manuals and pedals. Some of the stops can be dated to 1880 or 1896, when the instrument was enlarged. The organ was refurbished in 1996–97 for the centenary of the cathedral. In addition to serving the liturgical needs of the cathedral, the organ is occasional used for recitals and recordings.

Great Organ C–
1.	Gemshorn	16′
2.	Open Diapason	8′
3.	Gemshorn	8′
4.	Stopped Diapason	8′
5.	Harmonic Flute	8′
6.	Dulciana	8′
7.	Principal	4′
8.	Gemshorn	4′
9.	Suabe Flute	4′
10.	Twelfth	2 2/3′
11.	Fifteenth	2′
12.	Fourniture V
13.	Mixture V
14.	Grand Cymbel V
15.	Trumpet	8′
16.	Clarion	4′

Swell C–
17.	Gedeckt	16′
18.	Open Diapason	8′
19.	Stopped Diapason	8′
20.	Viola da Gamba	8′
21.	Salicional	8′
22.	Voix Céleste	8′
23.	Principal	4′
24.	Stopped Flute	4′
25.	Twelfth	2 2/3′
26.	Fifteenth	2′
27.	Piccolo	2′
28.	Cornet III
29.	Mixture V
30.	Double Trumpet	16′
31.	Cornopean	8′
32.	Trompette harm.	8′
33.	Oboe	8′
34.	Clarion	4′

Solo C–
35.	Harmonic Flute	8′
36.	Viola	8′
37.	Viola Céleste	8′
38.	Concert Flute	4′
39.	Flageolet	2′
40.	Double Clarinet	16′
41.	Clarinet	8′
42.	Orchestral Oboe	8′
43.	Cor Anglais	8′
44.	Posaune	8′
45.	Clarion	4′
46.	Tuba	8′
47.	Trompette en cham.	8′

Positiv Organ C–
48.	Principal	8′
49.	Gedeckt	8′
50.	Principal	4′
51.	Quintadena	4′
52.	Nazard	2 2/3′
53.	Waldflöte	2′
54.	Tièrce	1 3/5′
55.	Larigot	1 1/3′
56.	Sifflöte	1′
57.	Zymbel IV
58.	Cromorne	8′

Pedals C–
59.	Acoustic Bass	32′
60.	Open Diapason-Wood	16′
61.	Gemshorn	16′
62.	Violone	16′
63.	Bourdon	16′
64.	Gedeckt	16′

(continued)
65.	Octave -Wood	8′
66.	Principal	8′
67.	Bass Flute	8′
68.	Gemshorn	8′
69.	Violoncello	8′
70.	Twelfth	5 1/3′

(continued)
71.	Fifteenth	4′
72.	Flute Dolce	4′
73.	Mixture IV
74.	Contra Bombarde	32′
75.	Bombarde	16′
76.	Double Trumpet	16′

(continued)
77.	Double Clarinet	16′
78.	Bombarde	8′
79.	Trumpet	8′
80.	Clarion	4′
81.	Trumpet	4′

=== Bells ===
The bells of the cathedral were acquired by Bishop Goold, Melbourne's Roman Catholic leader at the time, when he visited Europe in 1851–1852. He bought a peal of eight bells for £500 (with some records showing that it cost £700). They arrived in Australia in 1853. The peal of eight bells is in F natural, with the tenor weighing 12 long cwt 1 qr 10 lb (1,382 lb or 627 kg) and the treble 4 long cwt 12 qr 14 lb (798 lb or 362 kg). The peal set weights around 3,556 kilograms (7,840 lb). The bells were all cast by John Murphy of Dublin in 1852.

The bells were hung in a low frame at ground level in the western aisle in 1868. The consecration service was attended by around 5,000 people. The eight bell bears the coat of arms of Bishop Goold. The bells were eventually hung at the south-eastern tower.

The ringers of St Patrick's began the custom of ringing in the New Year in 1871. And by the 1880s, St Patrick's Cathedral became the leading tower for Australian change ringing. The bells were rung for the requiem mass of Pope Pius X in 1914. By 1959 the belfry fell into disrepair and the bells became unringable. The bells remained silent until in 1988, when the peal was sent to Eayre and Smith Bell foundry in England as the major Victorian project among Bicententennial bell restorations. Upon their return, a ninth bell, an Angelus bell, was added. An electronic chiming mechanism was also installed at this time for all the bells. The original manual method was retained by the electronic mechanism, in order to replicate how the bells would have sounded if they were rung by hand. The entire eight headstocks had to be replaced just ten years after this installation. The ringers are affiliated with The Australian and New Zealand Association of Bellringers.

The bells are unusual in that they were cast untuned, they ring anti-clockwise instead of clockwise, and they are thought to be the only ring of eight bells cast by Murphy which are still in operation today.

== Photo gallery ==
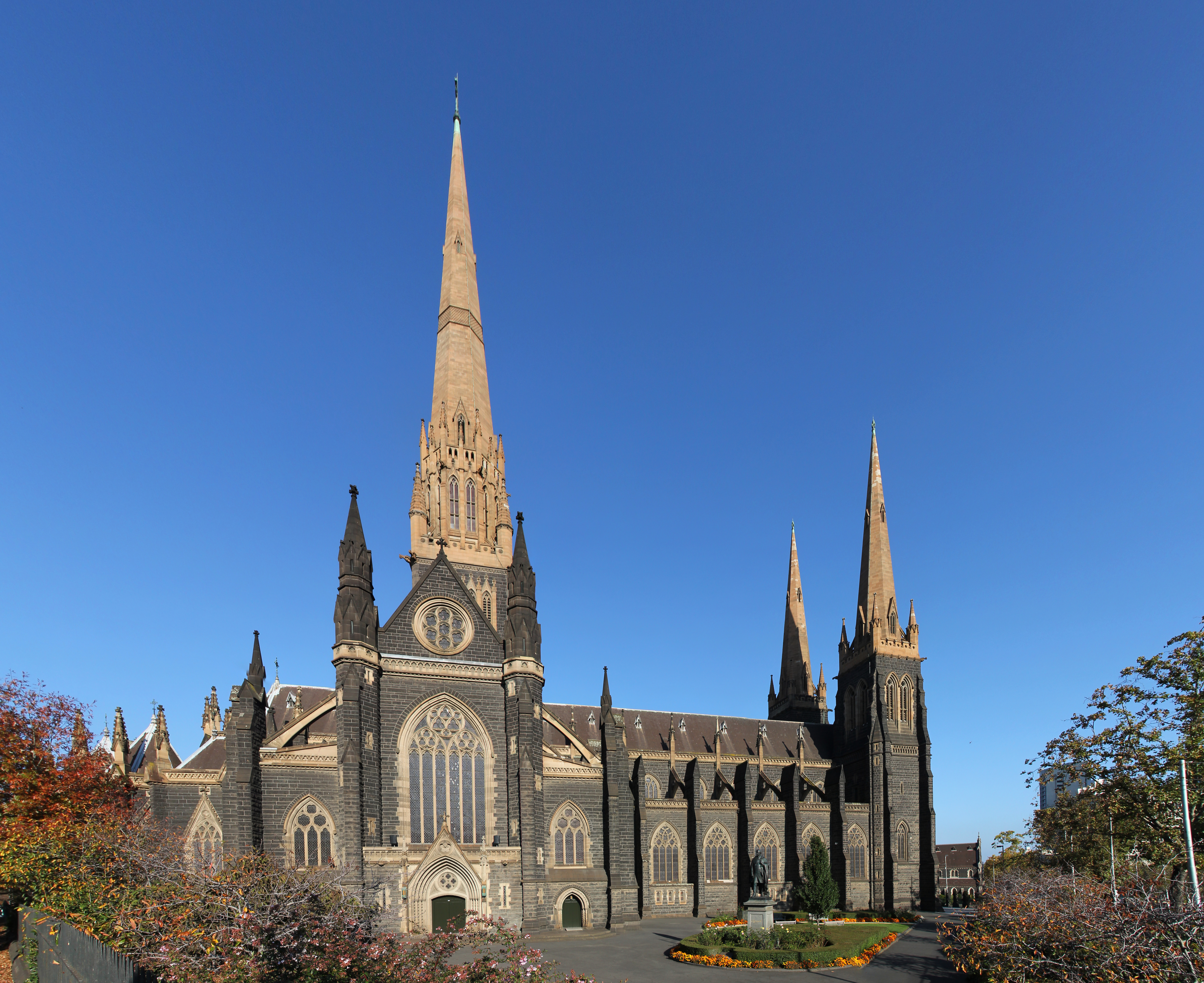
Gothic Revival architecture

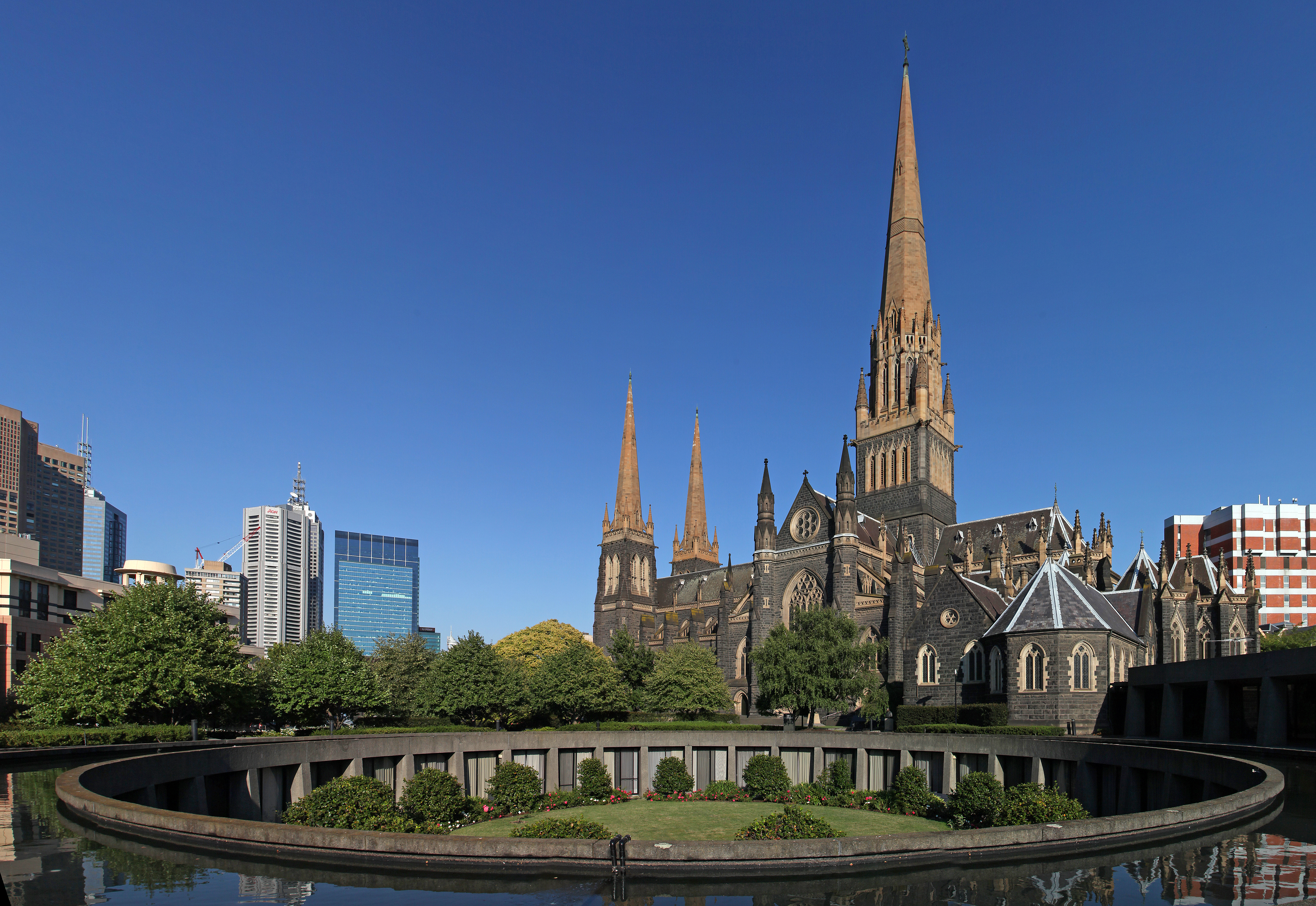
East round court

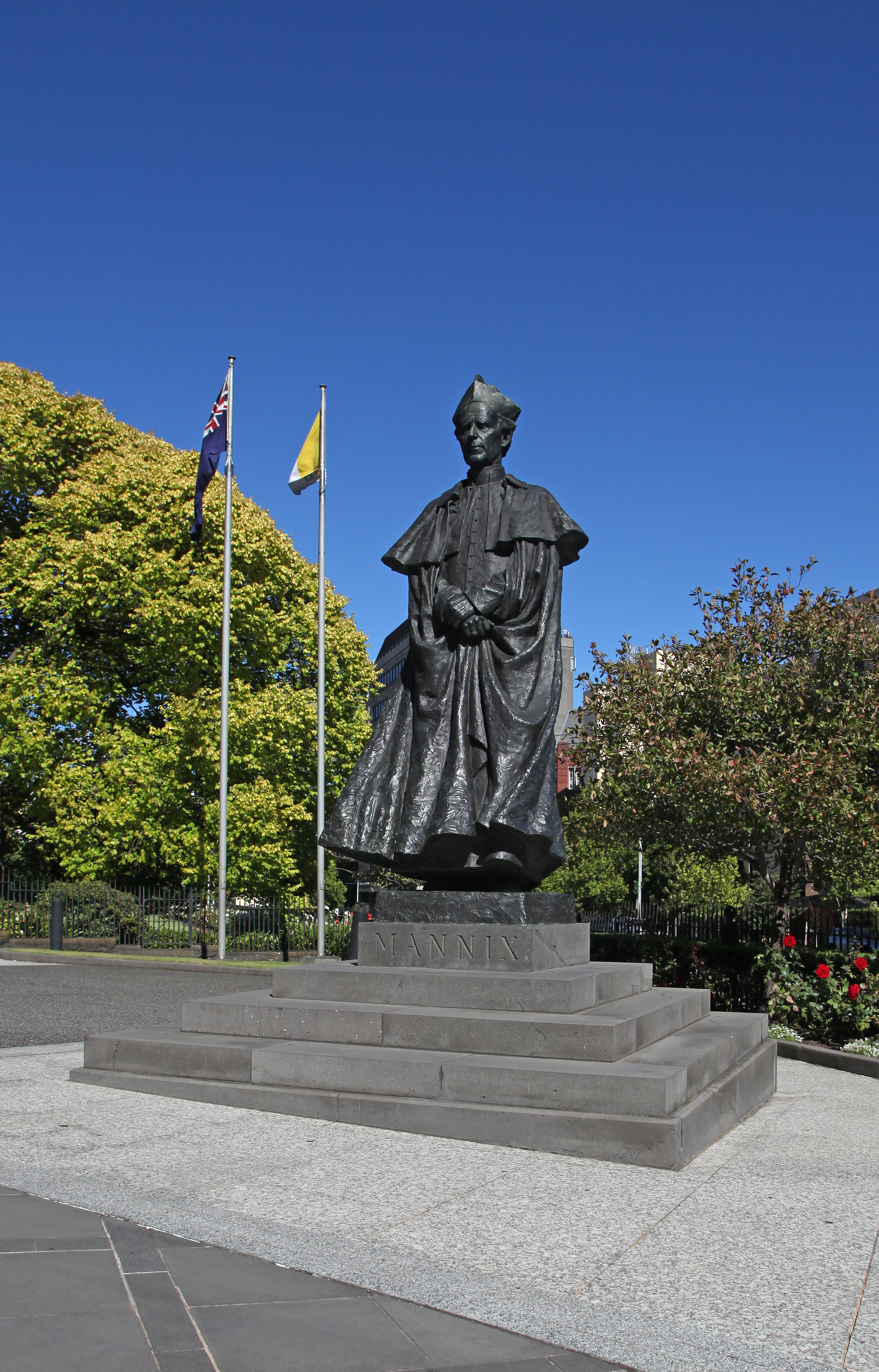
Archbishop Daniel Mannix (1863-1964) bronze statue

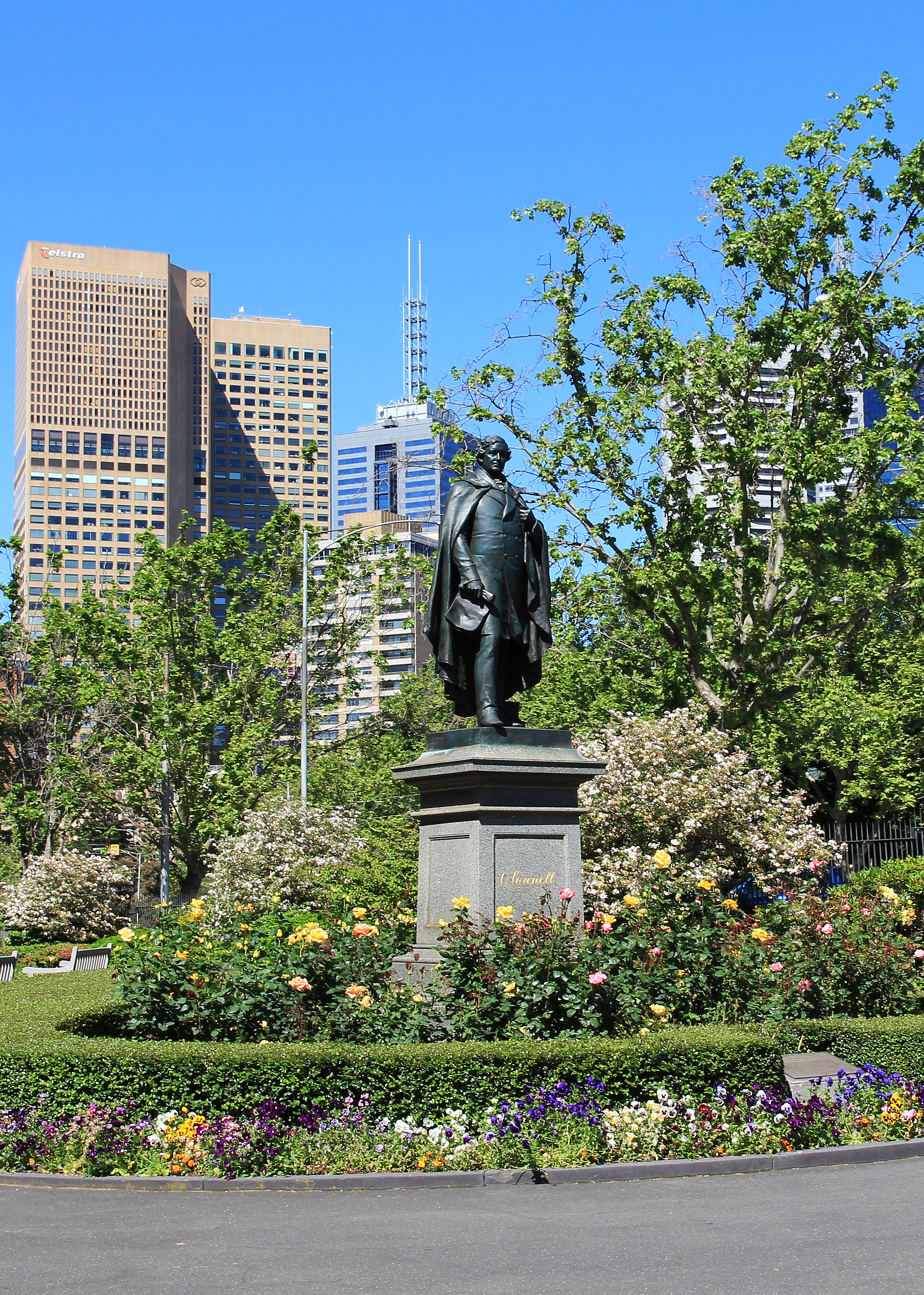
Irish Nationalist leader Daniel O'Connell statue

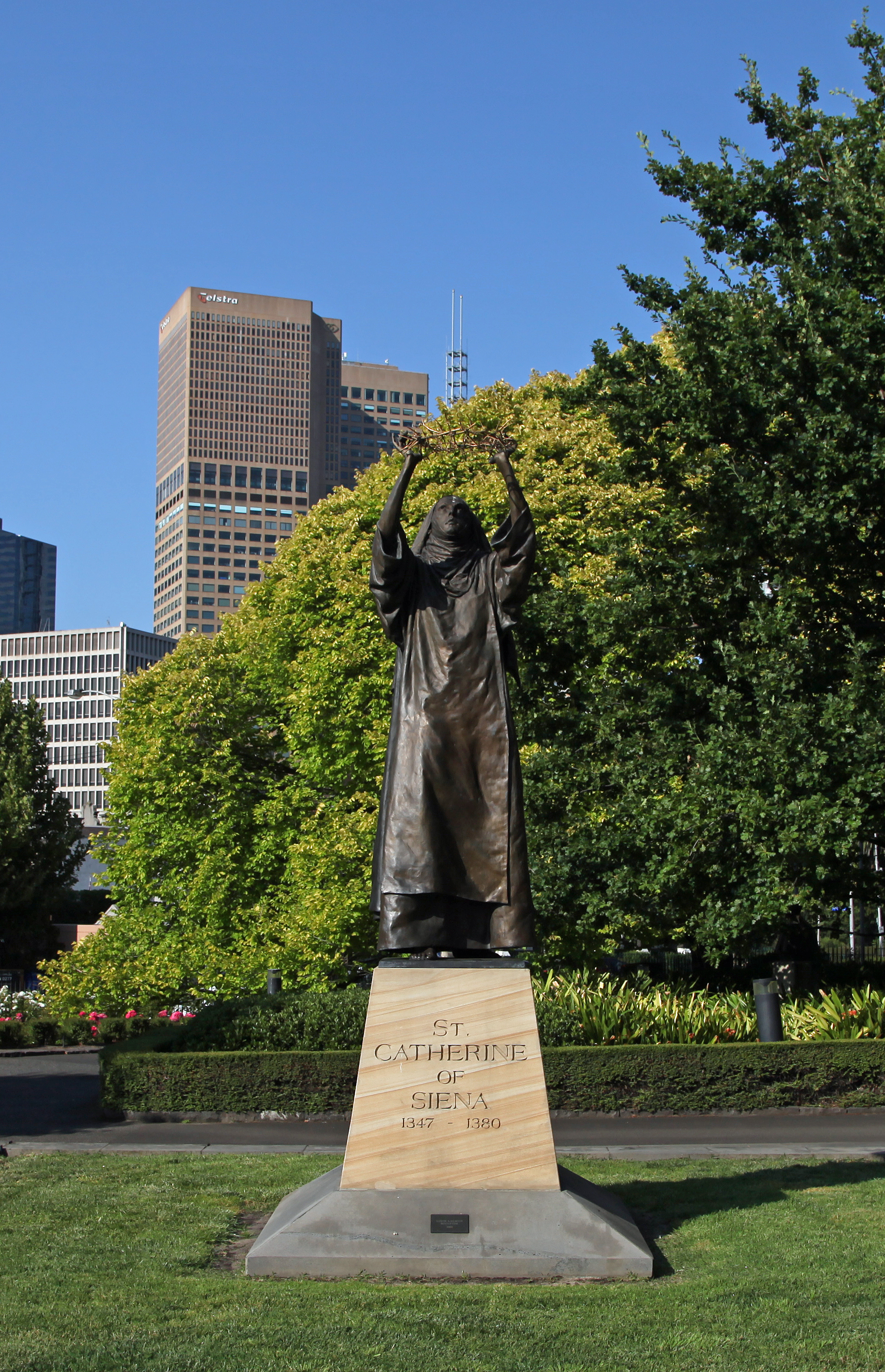
St Catherine of Siena (1347-1380) statue

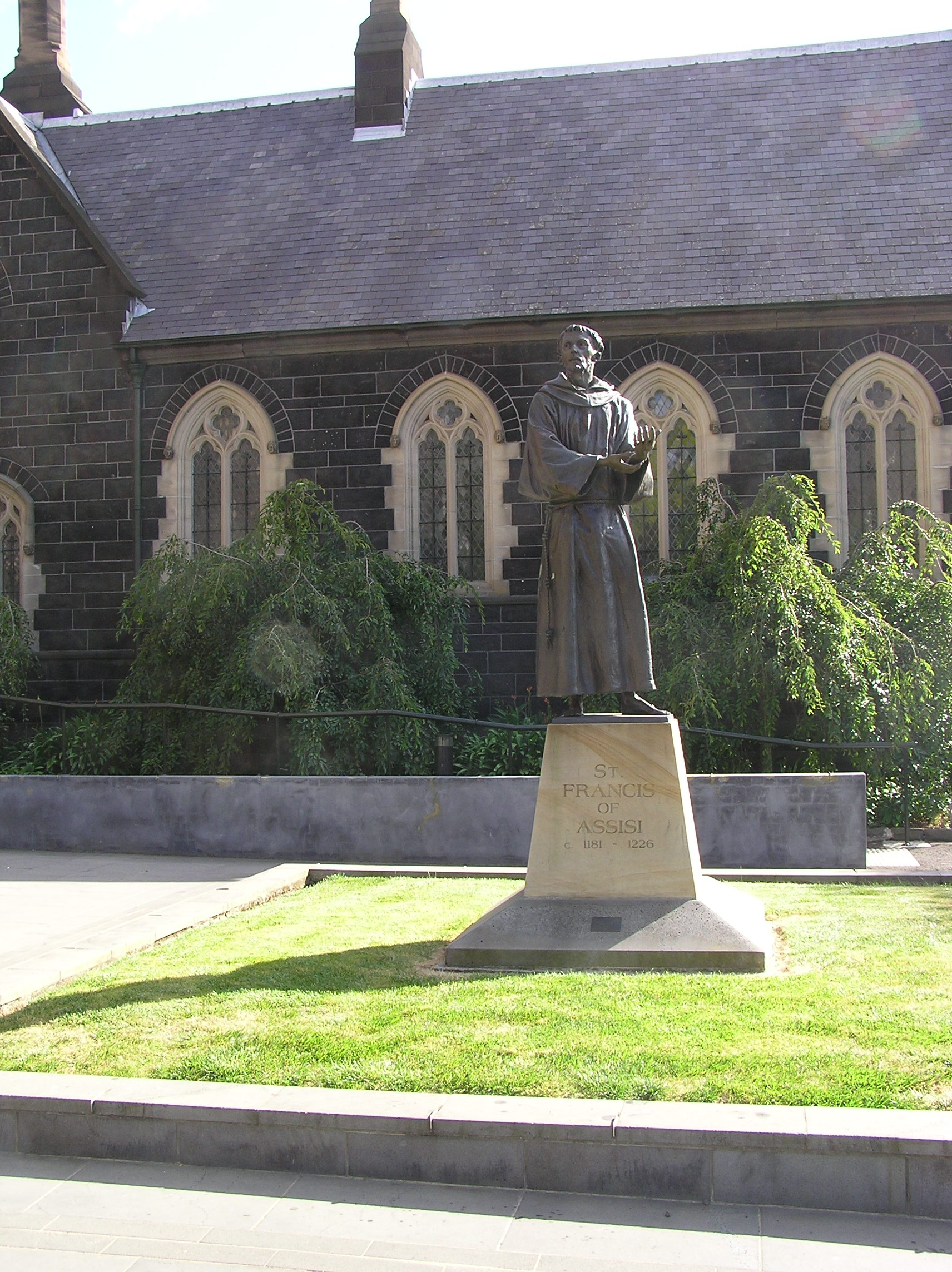
St Francis of Assisi (1181-1226) statue

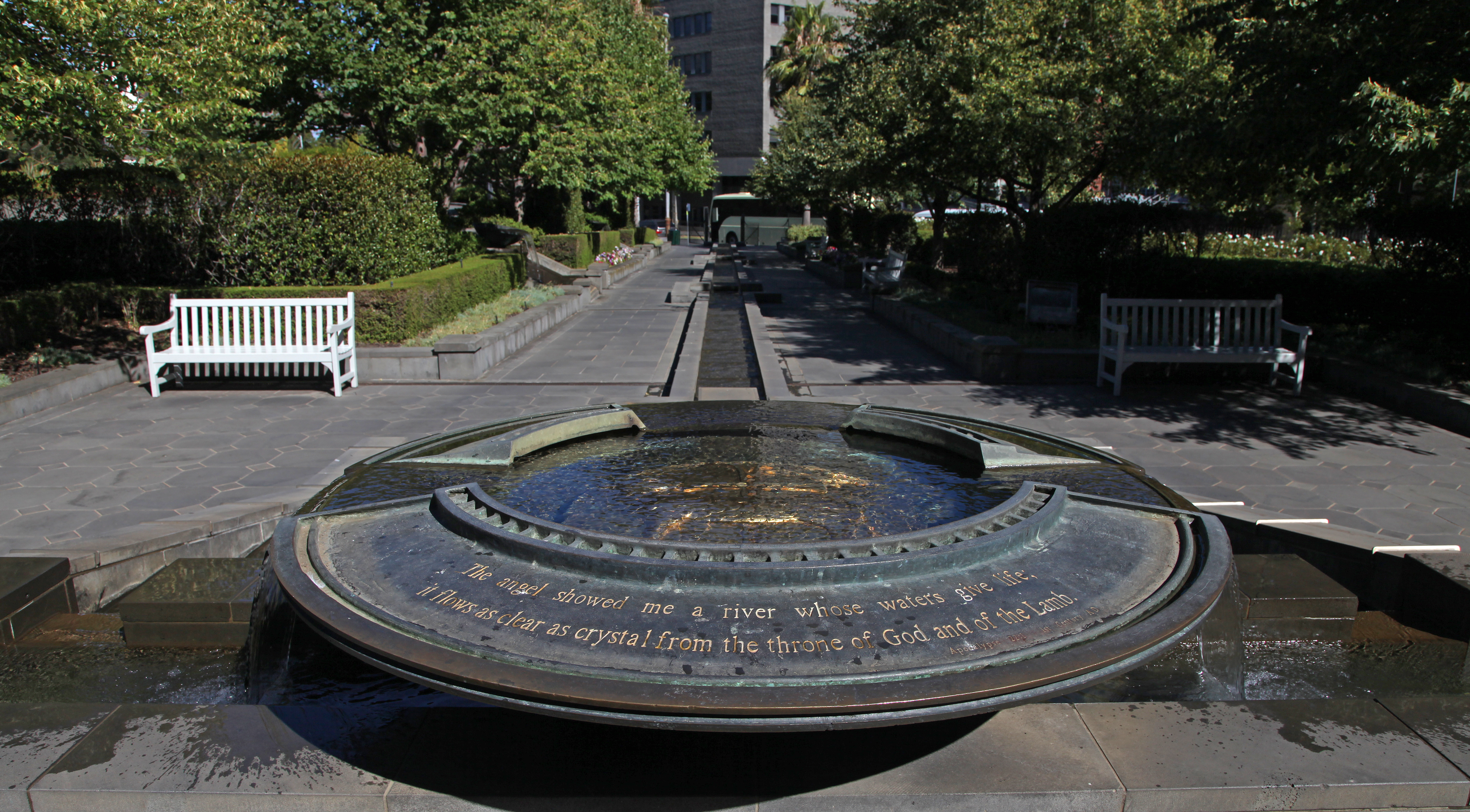
River from the throne of God and of the Lamb

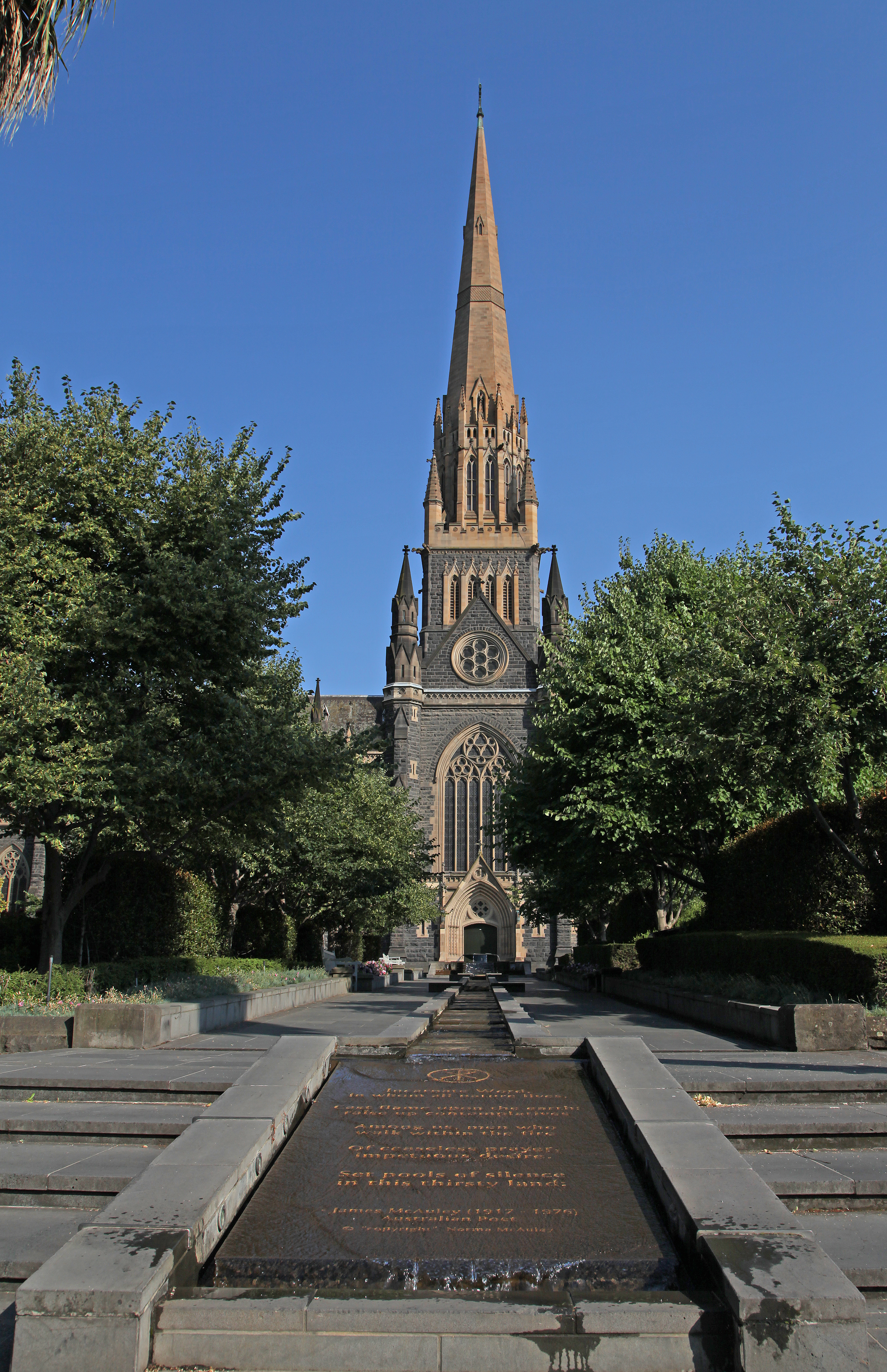
River Fall

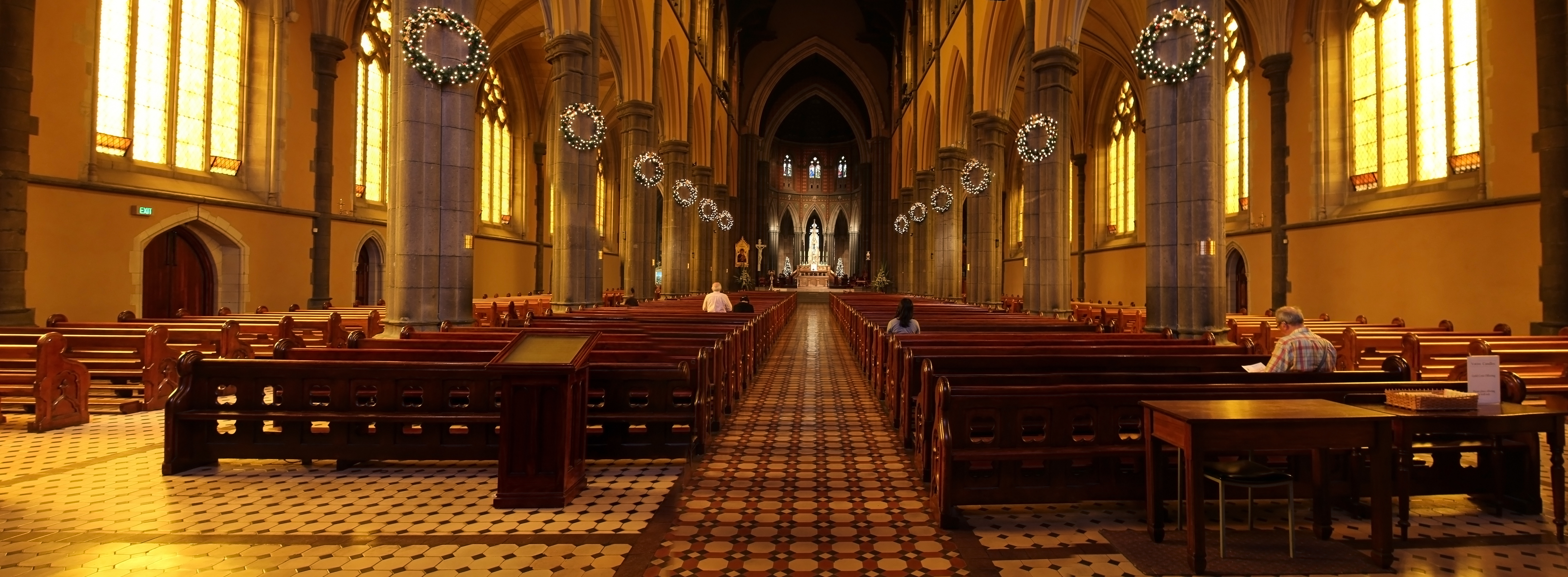
Interior

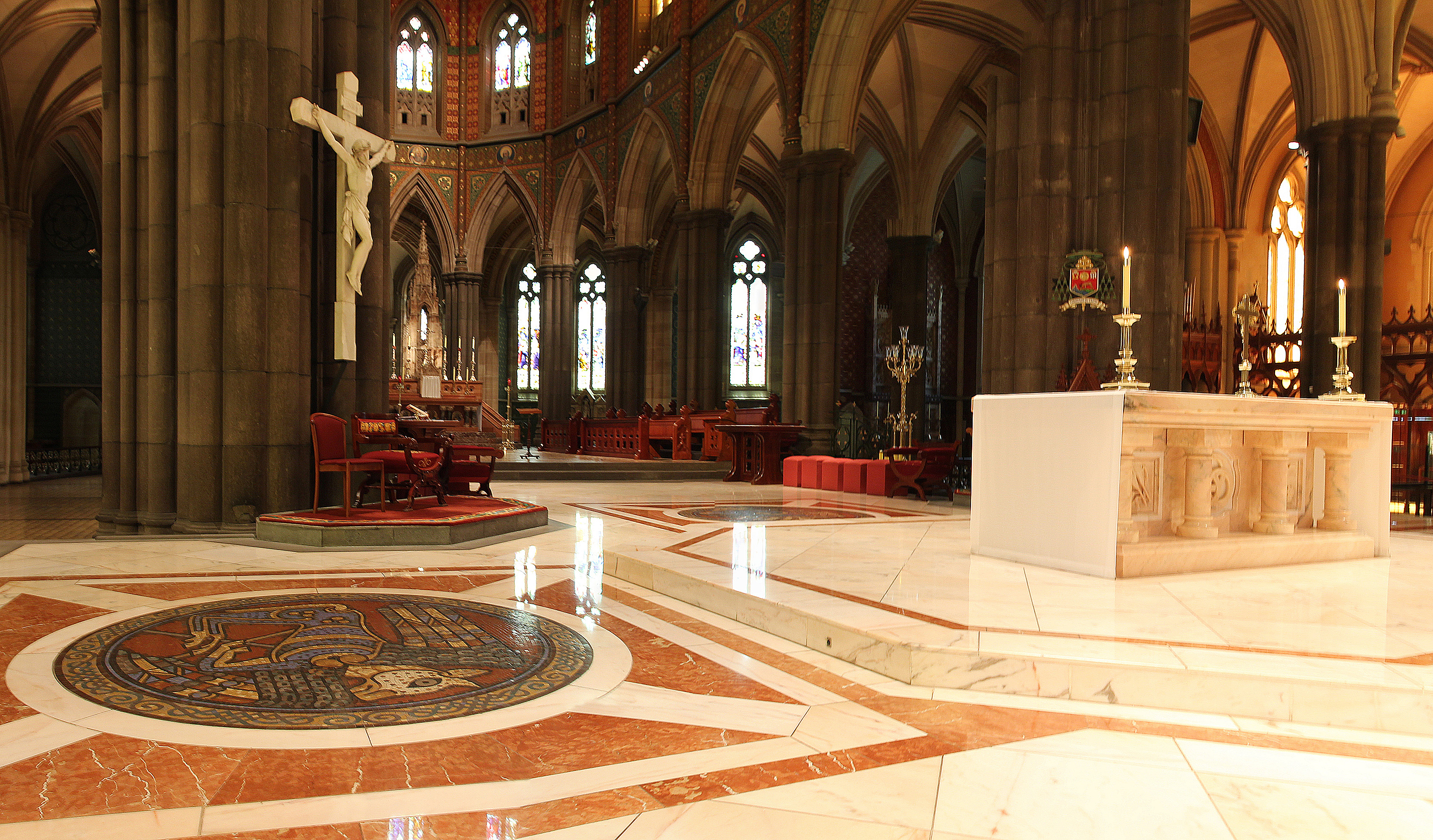
Sanctuary

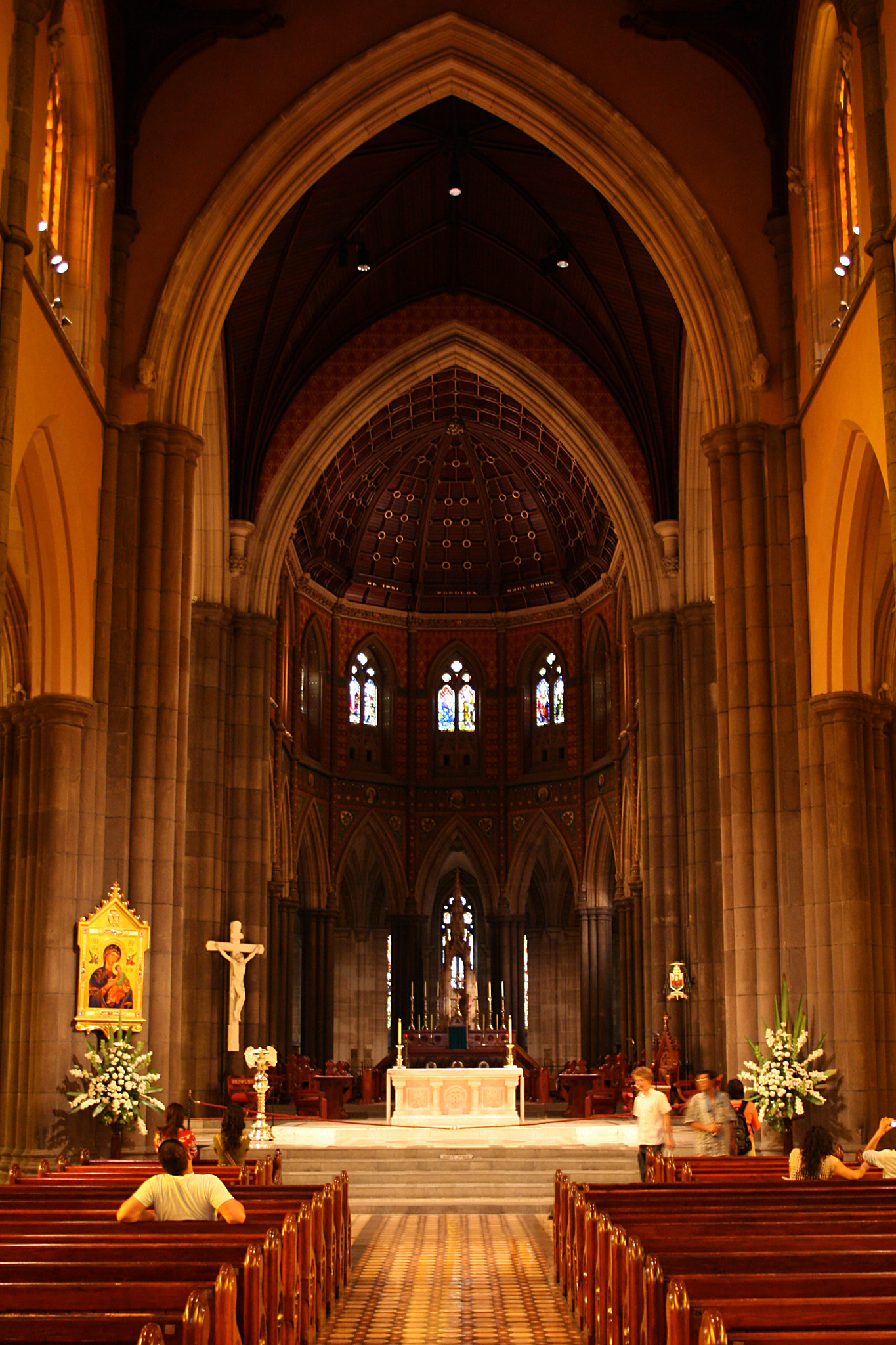
Interior

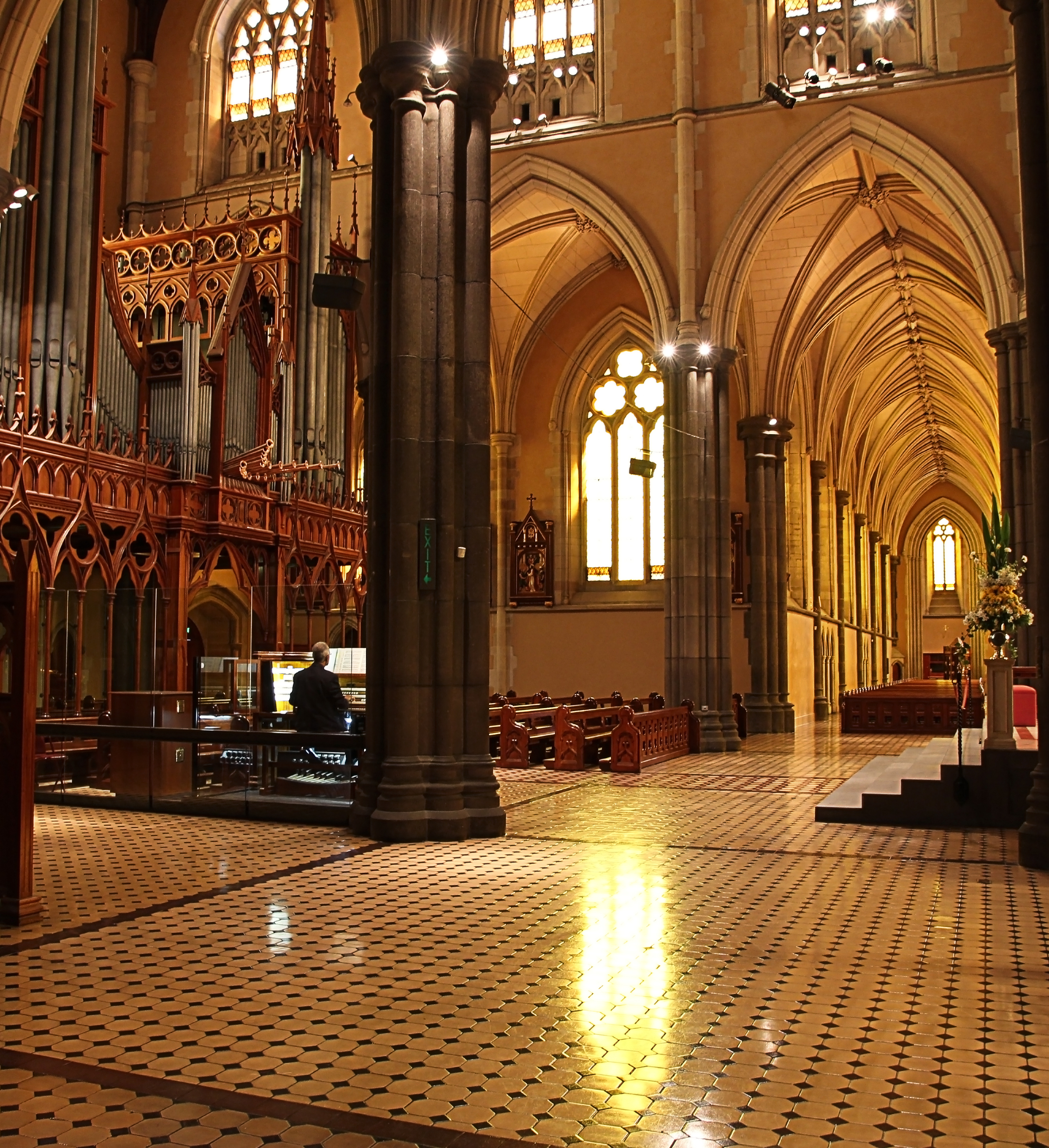
Organ

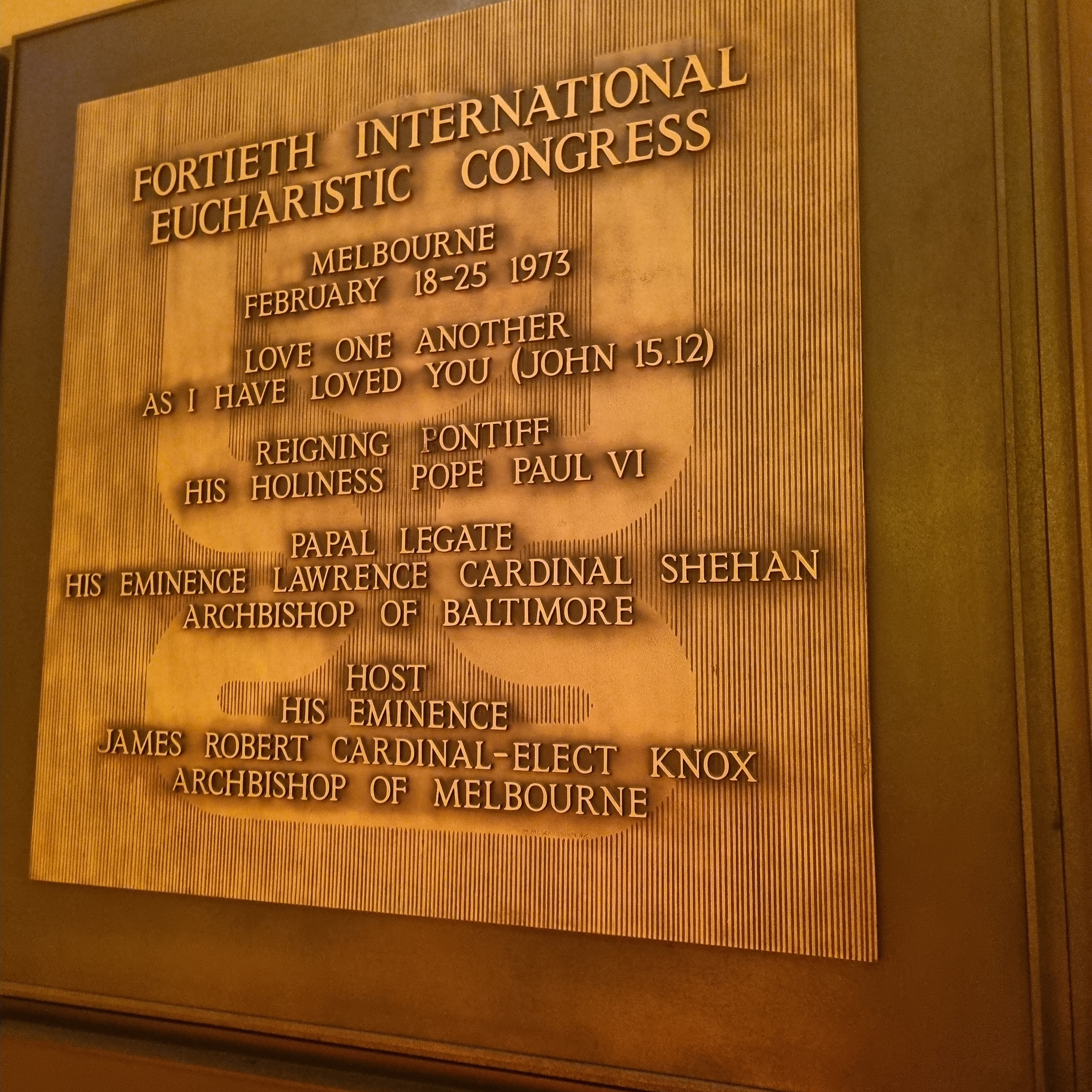
Knox plaque

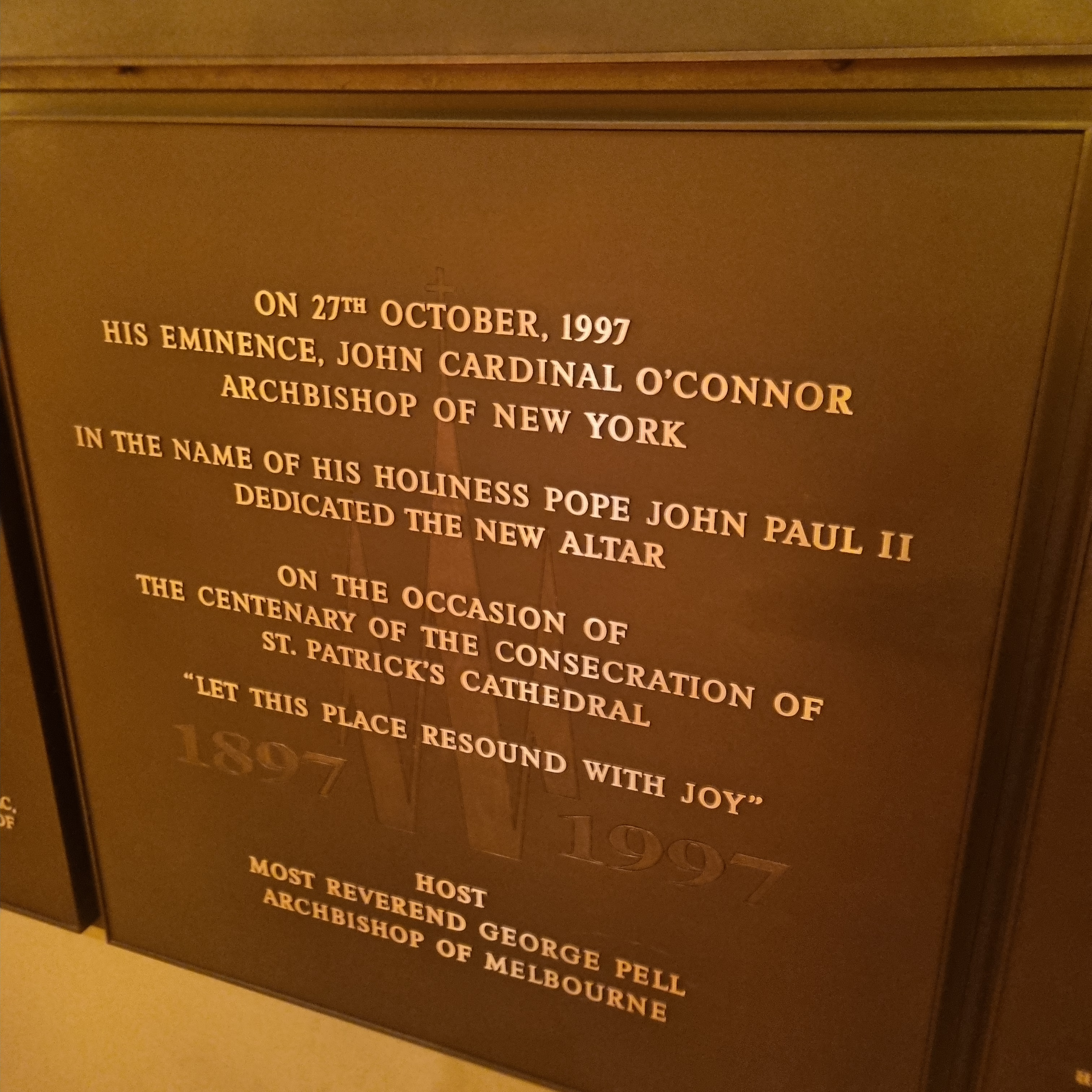
O'Connor plaque

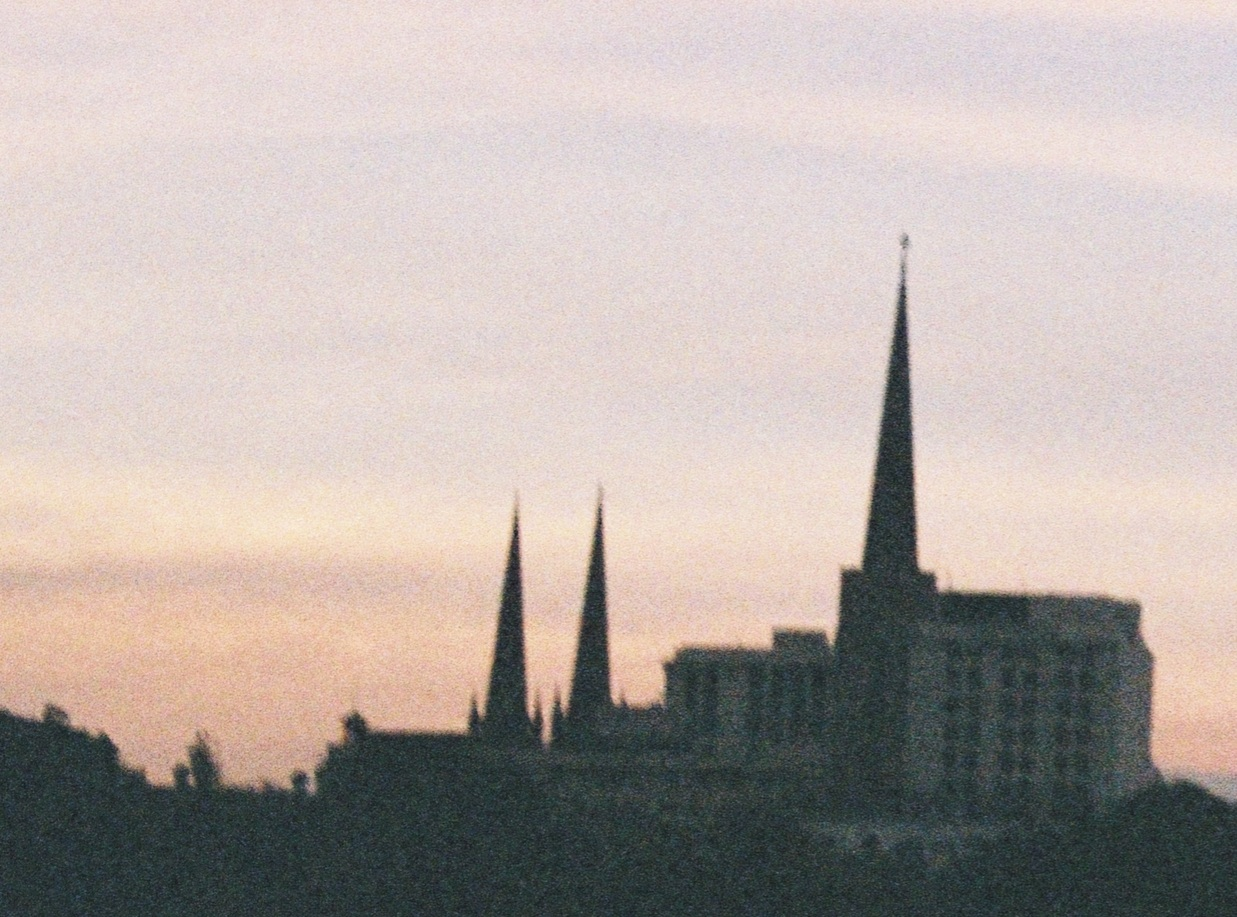
Cathedral from a distance at Sunset.

== See also ==
- List of cathedrals in Australia
