= James Alipius Goold =

Catholic Archbishop of Melbourne, Australia (died 1886)

The Most Reverend James Goold OSA
- 1st Archbishop of Melbourne
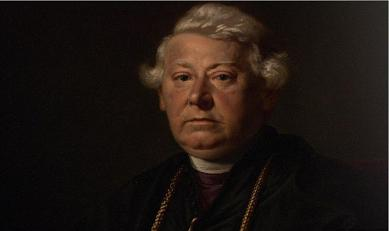
- James Goold as Archbishop of Melbourne
- Church: Roman Catholic Church
- Archdiocese: Melbourne
- In office: 1874–1887
- Predecessor: new title
- Successor: Thomas Carr
- Previous posts: Bishop of Melbourne (1848–1874)

Orders
- Ordination: 19 July 1835 (Priest)
- Consecration: 6 August 1848 (Bishop) in St Mary's Cathedral, Sydney by John Bede Polding

Personal details
- Born: James Alypius Goold; 4 November 1812 County Cork, Ireland
- Died: 11 June 1886 (aged 73) Brighton, Melbourne, Victoria, Australia
- Buried: St Patrick's Cathedral, Melbourne
- Denomination: Roman Catholic Church

Styles of James Alypius Goold
- Reference style: The Most Reverend
- Spoken style: Your Grace
- Religious style: Archbishop

James Alipius Goold (4 November 1812 – 11 June 1886) was an Australian Augustinian friar and the founding Catholic Archbishop of Melbourne in Australia.

== Life ==
=== Early years ===
Goold was born in Cork, Ireland. He attended a school established by the Augustinian order and then in 1830 at eighteen years old "entered the Augustinian novitiate in Granstown, County Wexford and was professed on 30 March 1832". Goold then continued his training in Perugia, Italy and was ordained on 19 July 1835. (From 1695 until the 19th century, Irish students for the Catholic priesthood were often sent to the Continent to study due to the then existing penal laws in Britain and Ireland.)

=== Missioner ===
After being ordained Goold lived in the Augustinian House of Santa Maria in Rome. In Easter 1837 he had a chance meeting on the steps of the Augustinian church of Santa Maria del Popolo with Benedictine William Bernard Ullathorne, Vicar General of New Holland (Australia). Ullathorne was in Rome recruiting priests for Australia, and Goold was convinced by Ullathorne to commit himself to seven years of missionary work in Australia, subject to his order's approval.

In 1838, Father Goold arrived in Australia aboard the Upton Castle. Also on board were Governor and Lady Gipps. Goold worked initially with Archbishop John Bede Polding in Sydney, becoming parish priest at Campbelltown, New South Wales, where in 1841, he built, St John's Church in 1841. He spent a considerable amount of his time traveling through the country on horseback.

=== Bishop and Archbishop ===
Pope Pius IX appointed him Bishop of Melbourne, and he was consecrated bishop by John Bede Polding on 6 August 1848, (the feast of the Transfiguration) in old St Mary's Cathedral in Sydney. He transferred to Melbourne, traveling overland in 19 days, being installed on 8 October 1848 in his first Cathedral, St Francis Church in Lonsdale Street. Goold was only the second Roman Catholic bishop in Australia. He arrived in his new town to find only two Catholic church buildings, four priests in the diocese, no religious sisters or brothers, and a population around 11,000. Within thirteen years of arriving in Melbourne, the capable and determined Goold had increased the number of church buildings in Melbourne to 64.

As an Irishman of his times and immediate history, Goold had experienced the consequences of sectarianism, and in Australia disputed the title of "Bishop of Melbourne" with the then Anglican bishop of Melbourne, Dr Charles Perry. Under Australian law (unlike British law at the time) Goold was found to have equal right to the title.

Goold was an expansionist. He attempted to persuade his home Irish province of the Augustinians to establish a seminary and novitiate in Melbourne. Though the Irish province agreed to Goold's requests in principle, the plan did not come to fruition in his lifetime. The first Australian Augustinian was not ordained until 1940, and the Australian Province was not formally established as separate from its Irish founding province until 1952.

The Irish province was already sending missionaries to the US, India and England, and did not then consider an Australian foundation viable. Nevertheless, Goold commenced the building of Melbourne's St Patrick's Cathedral on 8 December 1858. In order to expand Catholic education, in 1857 Bishop Goold succeeded in bringing the Mercy Sisters from Perth into the diocese. He also introduced the Irish Christian Brothers to Melbourne in 1867. Other congregations he brought to the diocese include the Jesuits, and the Faithful Companions of Jesus. Goold engaged enthusiastically in Australian public debate over the issue of State Aid for Catholic education, and was politically pro-active in opposing what he referred to as the 'godless compulsory education' of state schools.

From late 1869 to 1870 Goold attended the First Vatican Council in Rome, where he also met with three other Augustinian and Irish bishops. On 10 May 1874, while still in Rome, Goold was made Archbishop of Melbourne.

Archbishop Goold died at Melbourne on 11 June 1886 and was buried in St Patrick's Cathedral, Melbourne.

== Bibliography ==
- Anderson, Jaynie; Vodola, Max; Carmody, Shane, eds. (2019). The Invention of Melbourne: A Baroque Archbishop and a Gothic Architect. Carlton, Victoria: The Miegunyah Press. p. 319. ISBN 978-0-522-87563-8.
- Arneil, Stan (1992). "Out Where the Dead Men Lie". The Augustinians in Australia 1838–1992. Brookvale: Augustinian Press. ISBN 0-949826-03-0.
- Hogan, J. F. (1886). A Biographical Sketch of the Late Most Rev. James Alipius Goold. Melbourne, Australia: Alex McKinley & Co. p. 22.
- Martin O.S.A, Rev. F. X. (1986). A Great Battle Bishop James A. Goold of Melbourne (1848–64) and the State Aid for Religion Controversy. Ireland and Irish- Australia: studies in cultural and political history. London: Croom Helm.
- O'Farrell, Patrick (1977). The Catholic Church and community in Australia. West Melbourne, Victoria: Thomas Nelson (Australia). p. 463. ISBN 0-17-005129-3.
- Serle, Percival (1949). "Goold, James Alipius". Dictionary of Australian Biography. Sydney: Angus & Robertson.

Preceded by new title	1st Bishop of the Catholic Diocese of Melbourne; 1848 – 1874	Succeeded by title abolished
Preceded by new title	1st Archbishop of the Catholic Archdiocese of Melbourne; 1874 – 1886	Succeeded by Thomas Carr
