= St Patrick's Cathedral, Ballarat =

Cathedral of the Roman Catholic Diocese of Ballarat, Australia

St Patrick's Cathedral
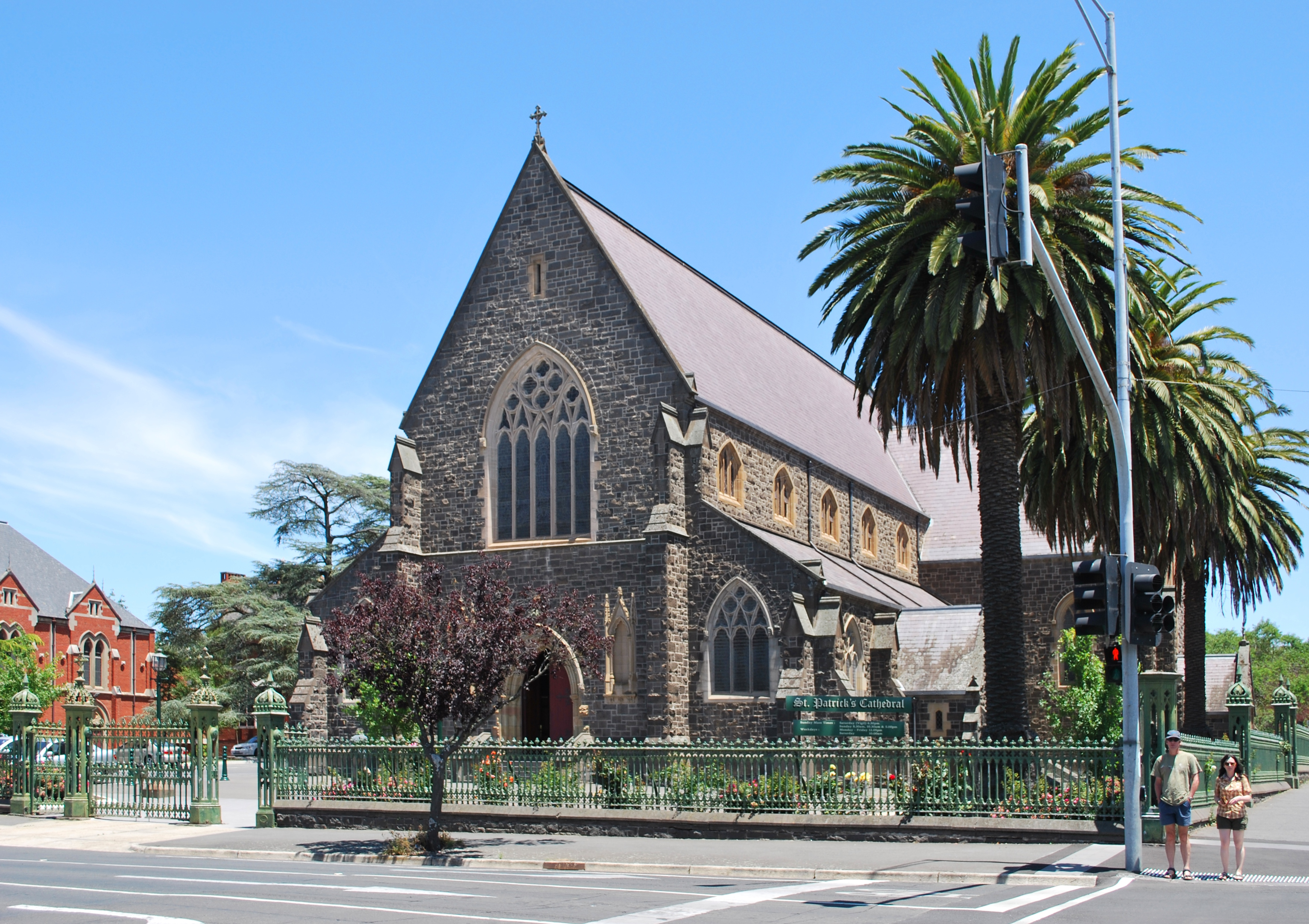
- Exterior of St Patrick's Cathedral, Ballarat
- St Patrick's Cathedral
- 37°33′44″S 143°51′07″E
- Address: 501 Sturt Street, Ballarat, Victoria
- Country: Australia
- Denomination: Roman Catholic
- Website: stpatscathedral.weebly.com

History
- Status: Church (1863 – 1874); Cathedral (since 1874)
- Founded: 7 February 1858
- Founder: Bishop James Alipius Goold
- Dedication: Saint Patrick
- Consecrated: 1891 by Francis Moran

Architecture
- Functional status: Active
- Architects: Charles Hansom, modified by Shaw and Dowden; J B Denny (eastern section)
- Architectural type: Church
- Style: Gothic Revival
- Years built: 1857 – 1871

Specifications
- Length: 46 metres (150 ft)
- Width: 30 metres (100 ft)
- Materials: Bluestone

Administration
- Diocese: Ballarat
- Parish: St Patrick's Cathedral

Clergy
- Bishop: Paul Bird
- Priest(s): Fr Ed Moloney; Fr Jim McKay

Victorian Heritage Register
- Official name: St Patrick's Cathedral and Hall, Ballarat
- Type: State heritage (Religion)
- Designated: 3 March 1994
- Reference no.: VHR H0997

St Patrick's Cathedral is the Roman Catholic cathedral church of the Diocese of Ballarat and seat of Bishop Mark William Freeman. The cathedral is located in the provincial city of Ballarat, Victoria, Australia.

The cathedral was built between 1857 and 1871 designed by local architects Shaw and Dowden, based on a design of English architect Charles Hansom. The cathedral was listed on the Victorian Heritage Register on 3 March 1994.

== History ==
The foundation stone was laid on 7 February 1858 by Bishop James Alipius Goold, with the first Mass being celebrated in 1863. The official opening was in 1871 and the cathedral was consecrated by Cardinal Francis Moran in 1891.
