= Mary (1994 film) =

- DVD cover
- Directed by: Kay Pavlou
- Written by: Kay Pavlou
- Produced by: Rosemary Blight
- Starring: Lucy Bell
- Narrated by: Claire Dunne credited as "Clair Dunn"
- Cinematography: Jan Kenny ACS
- Edited by: Margaret Sixel
- Music by: Douglas Stephen Rae
- Release date: 1994
- Running time: 71 mins
- Country: Australia
- Language: English
- Box office: A$184,001 (Australia)

Mary is a 1994 dramatised documentary from Australia about Mary MacKillop, from a concept by Julie Macken.

The film follows the career of MacKillop in a series of short dramatizations interspersed with commentaries. It was filmed "on location" in Sydney (only) and The Vatican, Rome.

The film features commentary by Claire Dunne, author of No Plaster Saint (credited as "Clair Dunn") and Sister Marie Foale, author of The Josephite Story, also interviews with Peter Gumpel S.J. - Saintmaker and Relator of Mary's Cause, and Sister Margaret McKenna - Mary Mackillop Secretariat. The book "Mary MacKillop Unveiled" by Lesley O'Brien was mentioned in the closing credits.

== Cast ==
- Lucy Bell as Mary MacKillop
- Rebecca Scully-Webster as the young Mary MacKillop
- Linden Wilkinson as the older Mary MacKillop
- Brendan Higgins as Father Julian Woods
- Brian Harrison as Bishop Laurence Sheil
- Maureen Green as Sister Teresa
- Brian McDermott as Bishop James Quinn
- Stephen Leeder as Father Charles Horan
- Frank Garfield as Bishop Reynolds
- Roslyn Oades as Sister Paula
- Vanessa Downing as Flora MacKillop (mother of Mary MacKillop)
- Ron Zines as Bishop Matthew Quinn
- Tommaso Monacelli as Pope Pius IX

== Home media ==
The film was released on DVD as Mary: The Mary MacKillop Story by Roadshow Entertainment.
