= The Northern Argus (Narrabri) =

Newspaper published in New South Wales

The Northern Argus was a newspaper published in Narrabri, New South Wales from around 1868 to .

It was owned for a time by the Irish-born George Birney (c. 1842–1918).

The business was purchased by Charles James Fox (– March 1903), previously of the (Adelaide) Irish Harp 1870–1875 and the (Hobart) Tasmanian Mail 1883–1888. He was the father of Frank Fox of The Lone Hand.

On 29 August 1890 fire destroyed the building and its contents: The building was owned by a Mr. R. Spencer; the printery, owned by Fox, included a steam engine and two presses, good quality type and consumables. Despite rumors, an inquest found no evidence of arson. Fox had a court case pending in which he was being sued for publishing a libel.
