= Sisters of St Joseph of Nazareth =

Congregation of Sisters of St Joseph of Nazareth
- Abbreviation: Post-nominal letters: RSJ
- Nickname: Josephites
- Formation: 1880; 146 years ago
- Type: Religious Order of Pontifical Right (for Women)
- Members: 850 as of year
- Superior General: Sr. Monica Cavanagh, RSJ
- Ministry: Education
- Parent organization: Roman Catholic Church

The Sisters of Saint Joseph of Nazareth, also called simply the Sisters of St Joseph or Josephites ("Black Josephites"), are a religious congregation who have their main centre in Whanganui, New Zealand. The congregation was a member of the Federation of the Sisters of St. Joseph which disbanded in 2013. The Sisters of St Joseph Whanganui received the Decree of Fusion with the Sisters of St Joseph of the Sacred Heart on 22 February 2013.

== History ==
The Sisters arrived in Whanganui in 1880 as members of the order of Sisters of St Joseph of the Sacred Heart, which had been founded in Penola, South Australia in 1866 by Mary MacKillop and Father Julian Tenison Woods. Early on in her project of founding these Australia-wide Josephite sisters, Mary MacKillop had met opposition from several bishops, who refused to allow them the freedom from direct diocesan control that the Catholic Church had recommended for the new institute. The problem dragged on until 1888 before their independence from diocesan control was firmly established. It was during this period of confusion that Josephites came to the Wellington Diocese (which at that time included Whanganui) through the intervention of an Irish Marist priest, Father Charles Kirk, who had ministered in Sydney and there learned of this home-grown congregation that was tackling the problem of the education of Catholic children, especially in outback Australia. Father Kirk had spent about three years as an assistant at St Patrick's Marist church in central Sydney before moving on to be appointed Rector at Whanganui in 1875. Aware of the high reputation of the Sisters of St Joseph in Australia, he set about getting them for his school. They came to him from the Bathurst Diocese where Bishop Matthew Quinn had formed the Josephite sisters there into a diocesan group under his direction, and it was as a diocesan group that they were welcomed in Whanganui on 25 April 1880. The Bishop of Wellington, Francis Redwood recognised them as a diocesan congregation for his diocese. To distinguish them from the Josephites who came directly from Mary MacKillop and who had since arrived elsewhere in the Diocese (at Temuka in the South Island), Bishop Redwood asked the Whanganui sisters to change their name to Sisters of St Joseph of Nazareth and that they wear a black veil instead of a brown one. In fact, they soon changed their whole habit from brown to black, and became popularly known as the Black Josephites.

Eventually a new convent and large secondary boarding and day school for girls was built on St John's Hill, Wanganui. It carried on the name of the original school which had been built in the centre of Whanganui when the sisters arrived, Sacred Heart Convent. The Sisters opened seven schools between 1880 and 1900 and many more in the twentieth century from Taranaki to Hawke's Bay, and south to Ōtaki. In 1883 some of the Whanganui Sisters went to Hiruharama (in English: Jerusalem) with Suzanne Aubert to help establish the Catholic mission there.

The congregation was fused with the Sisters of St Joseph of the Sacred Heart in February 2013 and this was formally celebrated in Whanganui on 24 August 2013.,

"The journey of the Whanganui Sisters of Saint Joseph has had its ebbs and flows. Numbers have fallen, ministries changed, buildings demolished. But just as the mighty Whanganui Awa flows onward, so also the charism continues to flow through all those who live the spirit of Saint Joseph."
