= Hadahur Music School =

Information
- Established: 2009; 16 years ago

Hadahur Music School is the first school for music in East Timor. It was founded by Australian nuns of the Mary MacKillop East Timor Mission in 2009. It lies in Becora, a quarter of the capital Dili.

Its aims are:

- To encourage and enable East Timorese of all ages to make music in the genres of their choice
- To encourage the East Timorese people to be proud of their traditional musical heritage, to enjoy it themselves and preserve it for future generations through learning and performing the indigenous East Timorese songs, instruments and dances
- To provide expert music instruction in Indigenous music, Western Classical music and Contemporary/Popular music to all interested
- To offer frequent opportunities for performance in these musical genres
- To train early childhood and school classroom teachers in music and music pedagogy and to assist them to include music instruction in their daily classroom activities
- To prepare East Timorese to a level of excellence to establish professional careers in music as composers, performers, teachers, entrepreneurs or in other capacities
- To cooperate with government and the private sector to contribute to the development of a viable music sector in East Timor.
