= Maria Sullivan =

Australian nun

Josephite Sister Maria Sullivan did mission work in Maria Comboni Mission, Mapuordit, southern Sudan and founded the Josephite Community Aid in 1986.
