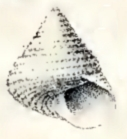
- Drawing of a shell of Calliostoma allporti

Scientific classification
- Kingdom: Animalia
- Phylum: Mollusca
- Class: Gastropoda
- Subclass: Vetigastropoda
- Order: Trochida
- Family: Calliostomatidae
- Genus: Calliostoma
- Species: C. allporti

Binomial name
- Calliostoma allporti (Tenison-Woods, 1876)

Synonyms
- Calliostoma (Fautor) allporti (Tenison-Woods, J.E., 1876); Trochus tinctus Watson, 1886; Zizyphinus allporti Tenison-Woods, 1876

= Calliostoma allporti =

Species of gastropod

Calliostoma allporti, common name the Allport top shell, is a species of sea snail, a marine gastropod mollusk in the family Calliostomatidae.

== Description ==
The height of the shell attains 12 mm. The small, white shell has a conical shape. It is imperforate and solid. The 6 or 7 whorls are encircled by series of granules, 6 in number on the penultimate and upper surface of the body whorl. The round beads are distinct. The base of the shell has about 10 scarcely granulous concentric lirae. The outlines of the conic spire are straight. The apex is acute. The suture is linear. The body whorl is angular at the periphery and a little convex beneath. The whorl is a trifle deflexed at the aperture. The aperture is quadrangular with a couple of rather strong riblets inside the upper outer lip. The basal lip is thickened. The rounded columella is very oblique and a trifle straightened in the middle.

== Distribution ==
This marine species occurs off Victoria, New South Wales and Tasmania.
