= Irene McCormack =

Australian Catholic Sister murdered by guerrillas in Peru

Sister Irene McCormack RSJ
- Born: 21 August 1938; Kununoppin, Western Australia, Australia
- Died: 21 May 1991 (aged 52); Huasahuasi, Peru
- Cause of death: Assassination by gunshot
- Burial place: Peru
- Education: Santa Maria College, Perth
- Alma mater: University of Western Australia
- Occupations: Religious sister; teacher; missionary
- Organisation: Caritas Peru

Irene McCormack RSJ (Kununoppin, 21 August 1938 – Huasahuasi, 21 May 1991), an Australian nun, was a member of the Sisters of St Joseph of the Sacred Heart who worked as a missionary in Peru. She was assassinated in Peru in 1991 by members of Sendero Luminoso ("Shining Path"), a Maoist rebel terrorist organisation.

== Early life ==
McCormack was born in Kununoppin, Western Australia, a small rural locality. In her youth she was said to be vibrant, determined, fun-loving; and an avid Australian football fan. McCormack was initially educated by the Sisters of St Joseph, and then boarded at Santa Maria College, Perth, she is said to have developed her two great loves: serving God and educating youth. At 15, she wanted to be a religious sister. She joined the Sisters of St Joseph in 1957, professing her first religious vows the following year.

McCormack was a teacher in Western Australia for the next 30 years. She was a teacher and principal, known as feisty and demanding. She was an accomplished golfer and tennis player.

== Missionary in Peru ==
After decades teaching in Australian schools, McCormack felt called to serve Latin America's poor. She became a Peruvian missionary worker in 1987. She first worked in El Pacifico, a low income suburb in San Juan de Miraflores, Lima, and Santa de Perola in Distrito de San Martín de Porres. On 26 June 1989, she left to serve in Huasahuasi, high in the Andes Mountains about 200 km from Lima. McCormack and her companion, Sister Dorothy Stevenson RSJ, were asked to supervise the distribution of emergency goods by Caritas Peru.

McCormack continued her ministry of providing poor children with library facilities to aid their school homework, which they otherwise would not have had. She also trained extraordinary ministers of Holy Communion as well as visiting parishioners in the outlying districts.

On 17 December 1989, the Catholic priests in Huasahuasi were warned of danger from Sendero Luminoso, so they and the two sisters left the village for Lima. McCormack, however, felt that the church could not abandon the villagers at this time, so she and Stevenson returned on 14 January 1990. Huasahuasi went 12 months without a resident priest. During this time McCormack and Stevenson served the people, providing spiritual leadership by regularly conducting services as no priests were available to go to the village.

== Assassination and funeral ==
It was an awful, frightening death. She'd been pottering in her garden in the hill-top Peruvian village of Huasahuasi when two armed women broke into the convent. Sister Irene McCormack was alone, trapped upstairs with no escape route. It was a situation for which she would have been usually prepared, and her course of action would have been to "head out along the river and keep going". Anne Henderson, however, has said that it did not happen like this. She describes in detail the last hours of McCormack's life in May 1991.

From the convent, McCormack was taken to the town square where 300 people had gathered. Earlier, the Shining Path terrorists had stormed the village, looted homes and terrorised the townspeople. Now, in the glare of spotlights, McCormack and four men were tried in a "kangaroo court" and sentenced to death.

Amid cries of "She's Australian, not a Yankee" and "Why kill these innocent people?", McCormack and the others were made to lie on the ground. The head terrorist gave the order and a young woman began shooting them one by one.

— (Frances Atkinson, "The surprising life of Sister Irene", The Age, 24 March 2002)

Near 6:00 pm on 21 May 1991 armed members of Sendero Luminoso entered Huasahuasi, threatening residents and entering multiple homes. Four men were taken from their homes to the town's central plaza. Guerrilla band members also went to the convent, where McCormack was alone whilst Stevenson received medical treatment in Lima. Sendero Luminoso members did not enter the convent, ordering McCormack to come out, which eventually she did. She was marched to the plaza and made to sit on the benches alongside the four men. The five were then put through a mock trial.

For about an hour the five victims were harangued, interrogated and shouted at. Several local people interceded for the victims' lives, calling them good people and not wrongdoers. Sendero Luminoso retorted that they had not come for a "dialogue", but to "carry out a sentence".

McCormack was accused of dispensing "American food" (Caritas provisions) and spreading "American ideas" (by providing school books). Local people vouched for her, arguing that she was Australian, not American, but this did not deter the guerrillas.

At night, young villagers surrounded McCormack in darkness, managing to move her back into the crowd. The guerrillas noticed her absence, returning her to the bench.

Eventually the five prisoners were ordered to lie face down on the terrazzo-tiled plaza. Each was shot once in the back of the head. McCormack was killed first, shot by a young female guerrilla, about six metres (about 20 feet) from the church door.

The bodies could not be moved from the plaza without authoritarian permission the next morning, so parishioners kept vigil by McCormack's body, burning candles and praying. Women laid her out in the sacristy, doing for her what was done for the men killed with her. On 23 May 1991 a funeral Mass was held before her burial in a Huasahuasi cemetery niche donated by a parishioner.

== Possible sainthood ==
In October 2010, Australian media reported McCormack's possible recognised sainthood after Mary MacKillop's canonisation. The Daily Telegraph reported that senior Peruvian and Australian Catholic clergy expected preparing a submission to the Vatican for McCormack's cause after Mary MacKillop's canonisation. Congregational Leader of the Sisters of St Joseph, Sister Ann Derwin, said that people in Huasahuasi, already regarding McCormack as a saint, demanded this. It also reported that people judged to have been martyrs do not require evidence of miracles performed through their intercession, hoping that this would accelerate McCormack cause.

== Legacy ==
The Irene McCormack Catholic College in Butler, Western Australia, was named after McCormack. The school was founded in 2000. Artist Rose Reilly has created two glass mosaic memorial pieces honouring McCormack. Resurrected Irene I, finished in 2007, is on display at the Mary McKillop Centre in South Perth. Resurrected Irene II is a large glass panel, and was completed in 2016. It is on display at the college.
