= Charles James Fox (editor) =

Australian newspaper editor and owner (c. 1827–1903)

Charles James Fox BA
- Born: c. 1827
- Died: March 14, 1903; Townsville, Queensland, Australia
- Education: St John's College, Oxford (BA)
- Occupations: Newspaper editor; proprietor
- Known for: Editor of The Irish Harp and Farmers' Herald; proprietor of the Northern Argus
- Spouse: Mary Ann Toole (m. 1866)
- Children: Sir Frank Fox

Charles James Fox BA (c. 1827 – 14 March 1903) was an Australian newspaper editor and owner.

== History ==
Little is known about his early life, but he was raised as a Roman Catholic and graduated with a BA from St John's College, Oxford.

He emigrated to Adelaide, South Australia, and married Mary Ann Toole on 31 October 1866.

Fox was the Latin master at John Lorenzo Young's Adelaide Educational Institution from 1868 to 1871 or later.

Fox was involved in various Catholic lay organizations. He served as honorary secretary of the committee to erect a memorial to Fr. J. N. Hinteröcker SJ (c. 1820–1872), and succeeded Benjamin Hoare as editor of The Irish Harp and Farmers' Herald in January 1870. In the newspaper, he notably criticized Bishop Sheil's excommunication of Mary MacKillop. As a result, he was ousted from the South Australian Catholic Association, where he had served as both a founding member and president.

He retired as editor around August 1875 to focus on an agency he was running at 71 King William Street, Adelaide.

In 1883, he moved to Hobart, Tasmania, where he edited the Tasmanian Mail. He left for New South Wales in June 1888.

Fox purchased the Northern Argus in Narrabri, New South Wales, where he served as both proprietor and editor. On 29 August 1890, a fire destroyed the building, which was owned by a Mr. Spencer. All of its contents, including a steam engine, two presses, and good quality type, were owned by Fox. Despite rumors, an inquest found no evidence of arson. At the time, Fox had a pending court case in which he was being sued for libel.

In May 1899, he was appointed editor of the Cairns Argus. He remained in that position until February 1903, when he sprained his ankle in a fall and was hospitalized in Townsville. He died there a week later.

== Family ==
Sir Frank Fox (born 10 August 1874), an author and editor of The Lone Hand magazine (among other works), was his son.
