= Josephite Community Aid =

Former Australian charitable organisation

Josephite Community Aid (also JCA or Jcaid) was a charity organisation based in Sydney, Australia, which, through the work of young volunteers, provides assistance to newly arrived refugee migrants, people facing poverty, mental disability, underprivilege and other special needs. JCA was founded in 1986 and relied on donations and the work of volunteers.

== History and community work ==
JCA (originally named "VCA" from Vincentian Community Aid) invited young people to serve the poor and marginalised. It was founded by Sister Maria Sullivan RSJ and Ian Chapman who was a close friend, who approached friends in 1986 with ideas for forming a group to help the poor and underprivileged with the assistance of young volunteers.

The group attracted a wide range of benefactors and young volunteers and found a particular mission working among the waves of refugee intakes reaching Australia, from war zones such as Lebanon, Yugoslavia, Afghanistan and Sudan. With the support of the Sisters of Saint Joseph, the Australian order of nuns founded by Saint Mary MacKillop, the group committed itself to aiding people who are poor and underprivileged through utilizing the talents and dedication of young people.

== Recognition ==
Representatives of Josephite Community Aid were invited to participate in the canonisation of St Mary MacKillop in Rome in 2010, with co-ordinator Adrian Thompson representing Australia in the procession of gifts.

JCA featured in the documentary Mary MacKillop: Soul of the Sunburnt Country, produced by Albert Street Productions and Sisters of St Joseph of the Sacred Heart.
