= Turbonilla macleayana =

Scientific classification
- Kingdom: Animalia
- Phylum: Mollusca
- Class: Gastropoda
- Family: Pyramidellidae
- Genus: Turbonilla
- Species: T. macleayana

Binomial name
- Turbonilla macleayana Tenison-Woods, 1876

Species of gastropod

Turbonilla macleayana is a species of sea snail, a marine gastropod mollusk in the family Pyramidellidae, the pyrams and their allies.
