= Northern Argus =

Northern Argus may refer to any of:

- Northern Argus (Rockhampton), a former name (1863–1874) of The Evening News, Queensland
- The Northern Argus, published in Clare, South Australia since 1869
- The Northern Argus (Narrabri), published in Narrabri, New South Wales
- The Northern Argus, published in Horsetown, California, by James Hart's from 1860 to 1863.
