= Alexander Cameron (pioneer) =

Alexander Cameron (18 August 1810 – 1 September 1881) was a pioneering pastoralist in the eastern colonies of Australia, particularly in South Australia, where he was dubbed the "King of Penola".

== History ==
Cameron was born in Lochaber, Scotland, a son of John Cameron and his wife Margaret, née Fraser, Highland Catholics. He received a good education and worked as a shepherd before embarking for Australia in the Boyne as an assisted migrant.

Cameron joined his uncles droving sheep from Sydney to Port Phillip, then across to South Australia, where in 1840 he was one of the first squatters in the Penola district. In 1845 he successfully applied for the occupation licence on 48 square miles (120 km^{2}) of verdant land, including the site of the future town of Penola. Initially he operated Penola as a cattle and horse station with animals he brought from Victoria, sheep being hard to procure. He had it surveyed into allotments, and built a shanty, a store, and a homestead, which became the "Royal Oak" hotel when he built a new homestead, some distance from town. One of his uncles, "Black Sandy" Alexander Cameron, left Tasmania to live with him, and died on 28 April 1858.

He later owned extensive farming country in Victoria as well. In 1851 he purchased Chirnside's cattle station "Hope's station" at Lake Frome.

In 1860 the young Mary MacKillop took a job as governess of their large family, also assisting with the education of the farmhands' children. Around this time she first came into contact with Julian Tenison-Woods, the parish priest. In 1862 MacKillop accepted a teaching position at Portland, Victoria.

In 1864 he sold Penola station, and retired to Melbourne. A controversy arose as to whether he could sell the Market Square, Allotment 18, which he had transferred to John Bowden.

== Family ==
Cameron married Margaret MacKillop (died 25 June 1863) in Melbourne on 27 June 1843. They had eleven children, of whom six outlived their parents.

He married again, to Ellen Keogh (c. 1854 – 24 July 1894) in 1867, living in Melbourne at Moreland (often Moorland) House, Coburg, where Cameron died and his remains buried in Melbourne General Cemetery. Seven of the eight children by his second wife outlived him.

== Recognition ==
A life-size statue of Cameron, by John Dowie, was installed by the Royal Oak Hotel, Penola, paid for by public subscription.
