= Charles Horan =

Irish Friar Minor and missionary

Charles Horan, O.F.M. (19 November 1837 – 27 January 1900), was a Franciscan friar from Ireland who served, as a missionary in Australia and possibly later the United States. He was a strong opponent of St. Mary of the Cross, foundress of the Sisters of St Joseph of the Sacred Heart and Australia's first saint.

== Early life ==
He was born Hugh Horan in County Galway and upon been received into the Order of the Friars Minor on 17 March 1859, at St. Isidore's College in Rome, he took the name Charles. Returning to Ireland, in 1863 he was named titular Guardian of the abandoned friary of Bantry. In 1864 Horan was appointed guardian at Cashel. In 1866 he received another titular appointment, this time as guardian of the vacant friary at Meelick. He resided in Cork. On 26 November 1867 he was reappointed Guardian of Cashel. At some point during these years he was stationed in Ennis. He was known as an eloquent preacher.

== Australia ==
Horan left Ireland for Australia in 1868, in the company of his fellow friar, Laurence Bonaventure Sheil, OFM, the Bishop of Adelaide (1866-1872). The following year he was reported for over-consumption of alcohol. He acted as Sheil's Vicar General, though not formally appointed. After Sheil's death a feud developed between him and the Rev. Christopher Reynolds. As Reynolds was a friend of Mother Mary of the Cross, she became an object of Horan's ire. A divisive issue over jurisdiction and canonical authority among the Sisters of St. Joseph led to a meeting with Horan:

One Thursday evening, 21 September 1871, Horan told Mary MacKillop that the bishop (who had called while she was out that day) wanted her to go to another convent. She could not go that night and wanted to discuss matters with the Sisters and the bishop as well. Horan told her that the bishop would not see her and added, 'I suppose you won't go.' She answered: 'Father, how can I under these circumstances.' Horan led her to believe that she was excommunicated. The next morning the bishop arrived with four priests and, in a ranting mood, amid the hysteria of some of the Sisters, and with MacKillop kneeling down on her knees in the chapel, he excommunicated her and sent her back into the world.

Citing this account, Ignatius Fennessy stated that "…Horan was at least in part responsible for setting the spark to the bishop's short fuse." Fennessy goes on to say that the entire business may have been based on a misunderstanding as Horan never claimed to have excommunicated her. When some of the Sisters - in the presence of Sheil - did not go to church the following day (believing that they had been excommunicated), he thought they were defying him. Sheil, however, lifted the penalty five months later from his deathbed.

== Later life ==
A canonical visitation by the Secretary of the Sacred Congregation for the Propagation of the Faith took place in August 1872, after Sheil's death. He was succeeded in June 1873 by Reynolds, who later became the first Archbishop of Adelaide. By then Horan was in Castlemaine in the Diocese of Victoria.

As a result of his investigations, the Secretary informed the Minister General of the Friars Minor that Horan should be recalled "for the greater tranquility of the region". Horan received his recall in August 1873.

Horan's life after Australia is unclear. He may have served in various dioceses in the United States for 15 years, from about 1876 on, apparently in Milwaukee, Wisconsin. He was back in Ireland by October 1892, dying at Limerick in 1900.
