= The King's Pilgrimage =

1922 book by Rudyard Kipling

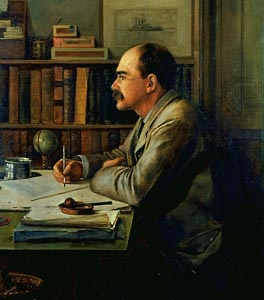
Kipling in 1899

"The King's Pilgrimage" is a poem and book about the journey made by King George V in May 1922 to visit the World War I cemeteries and memorials being constructed at the time in France and Belgium by the Imperial War Graves Commission. This journey was part of the wider pilgrimage movement that saw tens of thousands of bereaved relatives from the United Kingdom and the Empire visit the battlefields of the Great War in the years that followed the Armistice. The poem was written by the British author and poet Rudyard Kipling, while the text in the book is attributed to the Australian journalist and author Frank Fox. Aspects of the pilgrimage were also described by Kipling within the short story "The Debt" (1930).

== Poem ==
The author of the poem, Rudyard Kipling, had lost his only son in the war. Kipling, a member of the Imperial War Graves Commission, was its literary adviser and wrote many of the inscriptions and other written material produced for the commission. The first publication of the poem in the UK was in The Times of 15 May 1922, while the poem also appeared in the US in the New York World. The text of the poem includes references to Nieuport (a coastal port down-river from Ypres), and "four Red Rivers", said to be the Somme, the Marne, the Oise and the Yser, which all flow through the World War I battlefields. The poem also talks about "a carven stone" and "a stark Sword brooding on the bosom of the Cross", referring to the Stone of Remembrance and the Cross of Sacrifice, architectural motifs being used by the Commission in the cemeteries.

And there lay gentlemen from out of all the seas
That ever called him King.

'Twixt Nieuport sands and the eastward lands where the Four Red Rivers spring,
Five hundred thousand gentlemen of those that served their King.

— Rudyard Kipling, "The King's Pilgrimage", lines 43-46

Kipling's poem describing the King's journey has been compared to The Waste Land by T. S. Eliot, published later the same year. In her 2009 paper, Joanna Scutts draws comparisons between the structure of the poem and that of a chivalric quest. She also considers the pilgrimage as an "interpretive context" for Eliot's poem, stating that "[s]een through Kipling's poetic lens, the king's exemplary pilgrimage became as much romance quest as religious ritual", and suggests that Kipling's poem blurs the line between "conservative, traditional commemoration" and the "antiestablishment modernism" represented by Eliot.

== Book ==
The poem was reprinted in a book published the same year by Hodder & Stoughton. The poem prefaced the book, and lines and stanzas from the poem and from the speech given by the King, were used as epigraphs for the chapters describing the King's journey, and to caption some of the photographs. The book, which was illustrated with black-and-white photographs, sold in "huge numbers". A statement in the book declared that profits from the sale of the book would, at the behest of the King, be donated to the organisations arranging for bereaved relatives to visit the cemeteries and memorials. Also included in the opening pages is a signed letter from the King himself, again mentioning the proposed use of the profits from the book to assist those travelling to visit graves. Following the opening pages, the book proper consists of 34 pages of text, authored by Frank Fox, divided into four sections, with 61 black-and white photographs illustrating the book. The book ends with the text of two telegrams and a letter of thanks sent by the King following his return home. Later reprints of the poem included its use in the opening pages of The Silent Cities, a guide to the commission's war cemeteries and memorials in France and Flanders, published in 1929.

The spirits of the mighty army of the dead seemed to marshall [...] come to receive the homage of the King, for whom they died, and to hear that in the land which they saved their names will live evermore.

— closing words of the text by Frank Fox in the book The King's Pilgrimage

== Pilgrimage ==
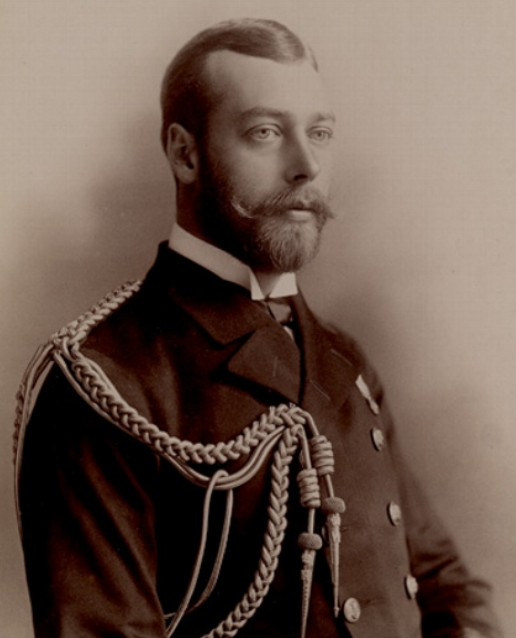
King George V in 1910

The King and his entourage, which included Field Marshal Earl Haig and Major-General Sir Fabian Ware, the head of the commission, travelled by ship, car and train, visiting sites in both France and Belgium. The journey was intended to set an example of pilgrimage to other travellers, and pomp and ceremony (apart from at Terlincthun) were avoided. The party inspected cemeteries and memorials, some still under construction, and met local representatives, army generals, war graves officials, memorial and headstone carvers and cemetery gardeners. During the journey, memorial silences were held and wreaths laid. Visits were made to graves of soldiers from all the Imperial Dominions, as well as India.

The sites visited on the journey included Étaples Military Cemetery, where the King laid flowers on the grave of a soldier following a personal request that had been made by the soldier's mother to Queen Mary. At Notre Dame de Lorette, a burial place and ossuary for tens of thousands of French war dead, the King and Haig met with Marshal Ferdinand Foch, who had led the French army during the final year of the war. Other dignitaries to meet with the King included the Bishop of Amiens. Kipling was touring in a separate party to that of the King, but was asked several times to meet with him. The pilgrimage culminated in a visit to Terlincthun British Cemetery on 13 May 1922, where the King gave a speech that had been composed by Kipling.

The official Royal Party, in addition to the King, Haig and Ware, included the Right Honourable Sir Frederick Ponsonby, Colonel Clive Wigram and Major R. Seymour. The pilgrimage started on 11 May in Belgium, after a State Visit with the Belgian King, following which the King and his companions travelled by Royal Train through Belgium and France, using cars to tour the cemeteries from the towns where the train stopped. As described by Fox in the book about the pilgrimage, places visited included Zeebrugge (scene of the Zeebrugge Raid), Tyne Cot Cemetery, Brandhoek Military Cemetery, Ypres Town Cemetery (including a visit to the graves of the King's cousin, Prince Maurice of Battenberg, and the King's one-time equerry Lord Charles Mercer-Nairne and Major William George Sidney Cadogan, the equerry to the King's son, the Prince of Wales). While in and around Ypres, the touring party also visited the site of the planned Menin Gate memorial to the missing, and several other cemeteries associated with battles of the Ypres Salient.

Crossing to France, the Royal Party stopped for the night at Vimy. This place was not yet the site of the Vimy Memorial that would later be built there, but recalling the battle fought here, the King sent a telegram to Lord Byng, at that time the Governor-General of Canada, and during the war the commander of the Canadian forces that fought at Vimy. On 12 May, the pilgrimage arrived at Notre Dame de Lorette, to pay homage to the French war dead. As with other locations visited, this site was not yet the location of a memorial, but as at the Menin Gate, the design for the memorial structure to be built here (a basilica) was shown to the King. After this, the route of the pilgrimage passed near or through places on the battlefields of the Somme Offensive, with many cemeteries being visited (Warlencourt, Warloy-Baillon, Forceville, Louvencourt, Picquigny, Crouy, Longpre-les-Corps Saints). On that evening, the King was greeted by the Bishop of Amiens at Picquigny. After journeying back towards the French coast, the night of 12 May was spent at Etaples at the mouth of the River Canche.

The final day of the pilgrimage, 13 May, started at Etaples Military Cemetery, where the King, at his request, met representatives of the Imperial Dominions: P. C. Larkin (High Commissioner for Canada), Sir James Allen (High Commissioner for New Zealand), Sir Edgar Bowring (High Commissioner for Newfoundland), and representatives of Australia and South Africa (these two High Commissioners being absent to attend the Genoa Conference). The next visit was to Meerut Indian Cemetery, meeting General Sir Alexander Cobbe the representative of the Secretary of State for India. The final visit was to Terlincthun British Cemetery to carry out what was described by Fox as the "crowning act of homage".

Terlincthun British Cemetery is located high on the cliffs of Boulogne, from which it is sometimes possible to see the white cliffs of the English coast. A fleet of French and British warships awaited the King to escort him home, but first, joined by Queen Mary, he visited the graves of the British war dead. Along with Haig (representing the Army), the royal couple were joined by Earl Beatty (representing the Navy), and General de Castelnau (representing the French Army), along with other dignitaries, including the cemetery architect Sir Herbert Baker. After visiting the graves, the King laid a chaplet at the Cross of Sacrifice, and together with a guard of honour of French soldiers saluted the dead to begin a two-minute silence. Following this, the King, facing the Stone of Remembrance, delivered an eloquent and moving speech composed by Kipling, which made reference to the nearby column commemorating Napoleon Bonaparte.

...here, at Terlincthun, the shadow of his monument falling almost across their graves, the greatest of French soldiers, of all soldiers, stands guard over them. And this is just, for side by side with the descendants of his incomparable armies, they defended his land in defending their own.

— from King George V's speech at Terlincthun British Cemetery, 13 May 1922

This was followed by a speech in French by General de Castelnau, referring to the sea breeze bringing scents of England from across the Channel, and pledging to guard and honour the British dead. More wreaths were laid, by de Castelnau on behalf of the Anglo-French Committee of the Imperial War Graves Commission, and by another French general for the French Army. The concluding ceremony centred around the Stone of Remembrance, draped with the British flag, before which the Queen laid another wreath. The French guard of honour lowered their standards, and buglers of the Coldstream Guards and Grenadier Guards sounded the Last Post, bringing the pilgrimage to its end.

== Short story ==
A description of the pilgrimage is also present in a short story by Kipling called "The Debt", which he wrote some years later and which was published in 1930. The story is set at the time of a serious chest infection that affected King George V in November 1928. News of the King's condition was broadcast to the nation and the Empire on the radio, and the story depicts the subsequent conversation and story-telling that takes place one evening between a 6-year-old boy, the son of a doctor at a colonial prison, and his carers for that evening, a household servant and one of the prison convicts. Among the stories told is one related by the convict, a tribesman and former soldier, as told to him by his Colonel. In this story, the convict describes the ordering of the construction of the war graves and the pilgrimage undertaken six years earlier by the King (referred to as "the Padishah").

And when all was done, and the People of the Graves were laid at ease and in honour, it pleased the Padishah to cross the little water between Belait [England] and Frangistan [France], and look upon them. He give order for his going in this way. He said: "Let there be neither music nor elephants nor princes about my way, nor at my stirrup. For it is a pilgrimage. I go to salute the People of the Graves." Then he went over. And where he saw his dead laid in their multitudes, there he drew rein; there he saluted; there he laid flowers upon great stones after the custom of his people [...] and the old women and the little staring children of Frangistan pressed him close, as he halted among the bricks and the ashes and the broken wood of the towns which had been killed in the War.

— From "The Debt" (1930) by Rudyard Kipling

The rest of the short story features further description of the pilgrimage, including a specific incident inspired by Kipling's own experience on the pilgrimage. In the story, as presented in "The Debt", the King travels to one of the war cemeteries where a British general is waiting to greet him. Although still recovering from an illness, the general had removed his overcoat and was waiting in his uniform in cold weather. The King told the general to put the overcoat back on against the cold, and warned him against a named illness that the general might otherwise contract.

This leads to the central theme of the short story, as (returning to 1928) the convict and the household servant, a devout Muslim, attempt to forecast the outcome of the King's chest condition. They note that the King had forenamed in 1922 the disease that would strike him in 1928; from this, the convict concludes that the King's kindly actions towards the general had saved the general's life and led to a "blood-debt" that would be repaid by the King recovering from his illness. In the short story, this episode with the general and his overcoat is stated to have taken place towards the end of the pilgrimage at an Indian cemetery, though accounts of Kipling's movements during the pilgrimage ascribe the incident that inspired the short story to a few days earlier on 11 May, a "bitterly cold" day when Kipling had been waiting for the King and Haig near Ypres.
