= Cairns Argus =

Former newspaper in Queensland, Australia

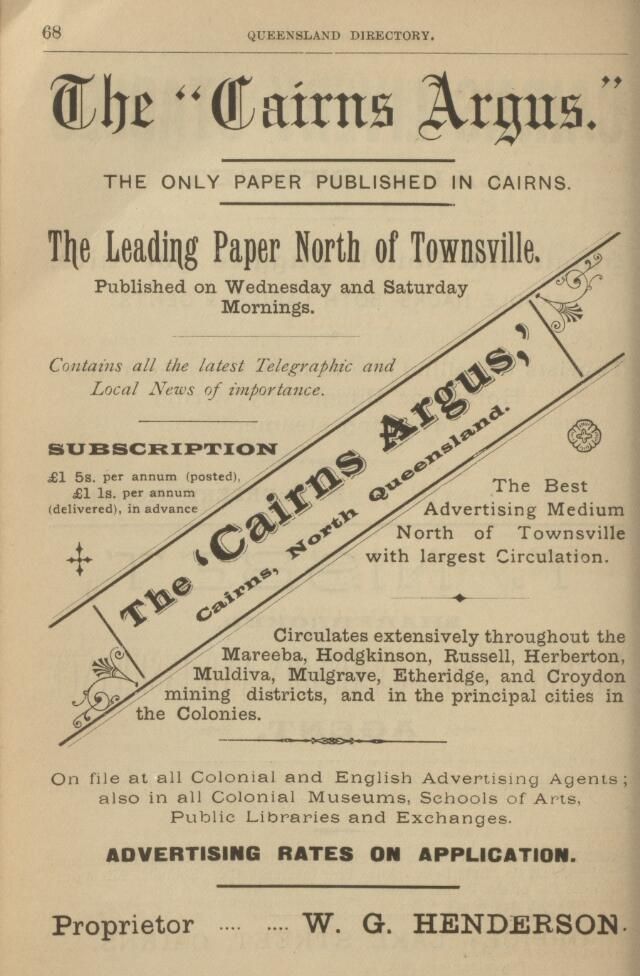
Cairns Argus (Queensland Directory 1895).

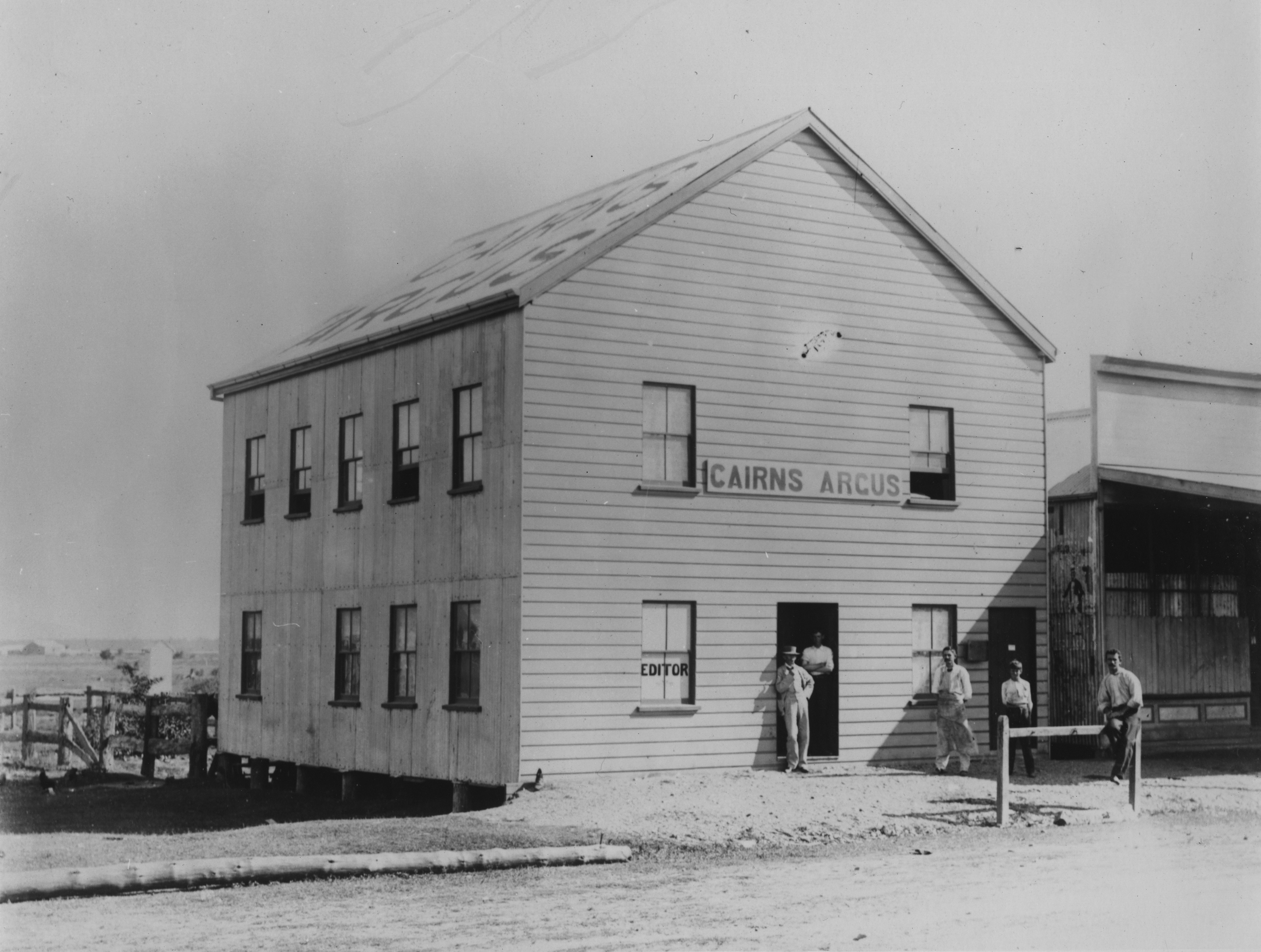
Premises of the Cairns Argus newspaper on Spence Street, Cairns, ca. 1898.

The Cairns Argus, from 1911 onward Cairns Daily Argus, was a newspaper published from 1888 to 1918 in Cairns, Queensland, Australia.

== History ==
The newspaper was founded in 1888 by William Graham Henderson (1864, Edinburgh, Scotland - 1943, Atherton, Queensland). Thereafter it had a succession of owners. The Argus was published biweekly and three times weekly and from 1911 daily. In July 1918 the Council of Cairns made available advise from the publishers of the Cairns Times, a publication close to the labour movement, that they were taking over the Argus and forthwith coming out as a daily paper. The Times in turn would in be absorbed by the Cairns Post in December 1935.

Alfred Stephens was editor and part-owner from 1891 to 1893. C. J. Fox was editor from May 1899 to February 1903, when he suffered a fall and died in Townsville hospital a week later.
