= William Wyatt (settler) =

Settler and philanthropist in South Australia (1804–1886)

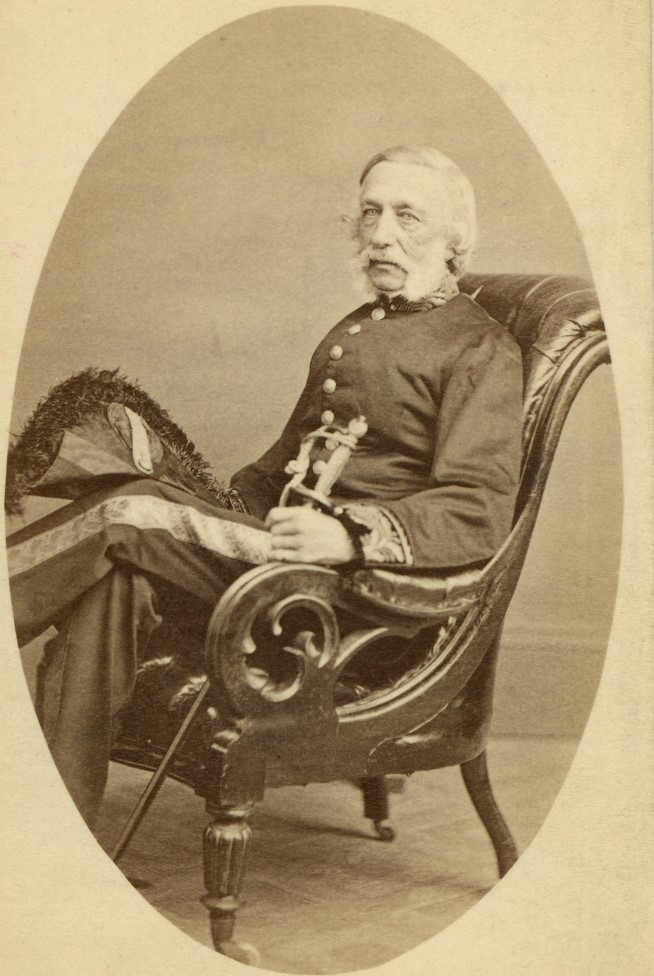

William Wyatt (1804 – 10 June 1886) was an early settler and philanthropist in the colony of South Australia. He was the third interim Protector of Aborigines in the colony between 1837 and 1839, worked on documenting the Kaurna language of the local Australian Aboriginal inhabitants of Adelaide and was a member of many boards, in fields as diverse as education, medicine, and horticulture.

== Early life and education ==
William Wyatt was born in 1804, in Plymouth, Devon, England, the son of Richard Wyatt.

He was educated Shrewsbury School and apprenticed at 16 to a Plymouth surgeon, Thomas Stewart. He continued to study medicine and obtained the qualification of M.R.C.S. in February 1828. He was curator of the museum of the Literary and Scientific Institution before leaving England.

== Career in Australia ==
In August, 1837, he was appointed city coroner. He served as the third interim part-time Protector of Aborigines from 1837 until 1839, replacing Captain Walter Bromley, who had been dismissed after criticism from The Register and was afterwards found drowned in the River Torrens.

During his time at Protector, he presided over the arraignment of Reppindjeri, a Ngarrindjeri man who had allegedly murdered European whaler John Driscoll, and was the first Aboriginal person recorded as killing a European in the colony of South Australia. Driscoll "was reportedly living with one of Reppindjeri's wives, Popalbe, in an arrangement to which the Aboriginal man consented"; however, "Driscoll had apparently molested [Popalbe]". Reppindjeri was chained up before being put on board the South Australian to be transported to Kangaroo Island. The case is significant because "there were no mechanisms in colonial law for prosecuting Reppindjeri". Wyatt condemned the practices of the whalers, who mistreated Aboriginal women.

Unlike his successor and the German Missionaries, Wyatt did not live at Piltawodli. According to Foster (1990b: 39) he was "criticised for not 'going among' the Aborigines and for failing to provide information to the public about their culture". Nonetheless, Wyatt does provide valuable, though sometimes unreliable, information on the language of the Kaurna people. After the German mission sources, it remains the next most important source and includes a sizable number of terms not recorded elsewhere.

A manuscript copy of Wyatt's wordlist, Vocabulary of the Adelaide Dialect (Wyatt, 1840)^{14} in the Library of Sir George Grey in the South African Public Library in Cape Town, contains only 67 words, though this is unlikely to represent the extent of Wyatt's knowledge of Kaurna at that time. A more comprehensive paper published later lists approximately 900 Kaurna and Ramindjeri words. The cover page notes that the material was "principally extracted from his official reports" most of which would have been written when Wyatt served as Protector from 1837 to 1839. Assuming Wyatt's (1840) wordlist in the Grey collection is complete, presumably Wyatt went through his papers and extracted words he had recorded in the early days of the colony. The University of Adelaide Library copy, donated by the author, contains three corrections in Wyatt's own hand, where n has been typed instead of u. This wordlist was also published in J. D. Woods ed. (1879) without correction of the three typographical errors. Wyatt identifies certain vocabulary items with a subscript _{e} or _{r} as Encounter Bay or Rapid Bay words respectively. In 1923, Parkhouse republished Wyatt's paper in three separate wordlists, designating them "Adelaide", "Encounter Bay", and "Rapid Bay" with changed spellings, substituting u for Wyatt's oo."

The South Australian Colonial Railway Company was one of three public companies contending to build a railway between Adelaide and Port Adelaide; the others being the South Australian Railway Company and Adelaide City and Port Railway Company.

== Later life, death, and legacy ==
After retiring, Wyatt published Monograph of Certain Crustacea Entomostraca (1883), and he contributed the chapter on the Adelaide and Encounter Bay Aboriginal peoples to the volume on the Native Tribes of South Australia (1879), by J. D. Woods and others.

Wyatt died at the age of 82 on 10 June 1886.

His only child to have survived past infancy was murdered by a drunken workman.

=== Wyatt Trust ===
The Wyatt Benevolent Institution, now known as the Wyatt Trust, was created by a Wyatt as a trust 1886, to help South Australian individuals struggling with adversity and poverty. It is governed by the Wyatt Benevolent Institution Incorporation Act 1935, and provides grants to a number of organisations, such as the South Australian Health and Medical Research Institute (SAHMRI), as well as individuals in the form of one-off grants. It supports the Aboriginal Legal Rights Movement, an Aboriginal and Torres Strait Islander Legal Service for Aboriginal South Australians.
