= The Irish Harp and Farmers' Herald =

South Australian Newspaper (1869–1873) for the Roman Catholic church

The Irish Harp and Farmer's Herald was a newspaper published in the British colony of South Australia from 1869 to 1873 for the Roman Catholic church. It was a forerunner of The Southern Cross.

== History ==
The Southern Cross and Adelaide Catholic Herald was first published on 20 September 1867 with the Very Rev. J. E. Tenison Woods as editor.

On 29 May 1869 The Catholic Herald and Monthly Summary took over The Irish Harp newspaper. The editor and manager was Benjamin Hoare, succeeded by C. J. Fox BA. Printer and publisher was James O'Dwyer Hennessy (died 13 June 1897)

The Catholic Newspaper and Printing Company (Limited) was liquidated in October 1870 due to the depression.

Fox was notable for his trenchant criticism of Bishop Sheil's excommunication of Mary MacKillop. and ousted from the South Australian Catholic Association, of which he was president. and founding member.

The paper was rebranded The Harp and Southern Cross on 5 December 1873 or earlier and published in Adelaide weekly until the 24 December 1875. Fox, who previously taught Latin at Adelaide Educational Institution, retired as editor around August 1875. He moved to Tasmania, where he edited the Tasmanian Mail. Frank Fox (born 10 August 1874), author and editor of The Lone Hand was a son.

The publisher was John Augustine Hewitt at 39 King William Street, and printer was Webb, Vardon and Pritchard of Hindley Street.

== Digitization ==
Copies of The Irish Harp and Farmers' Herald issues from 1 No. 1 of 29 May 1869 to Vol. 5 No. 190 of 31 January 1873 have been digitized by the National Library of Australia, and may be accessed via Trove.
