= Frank Fox (author) =

Australian-born journalist and author (1874–1960)

Sir Frank Fox
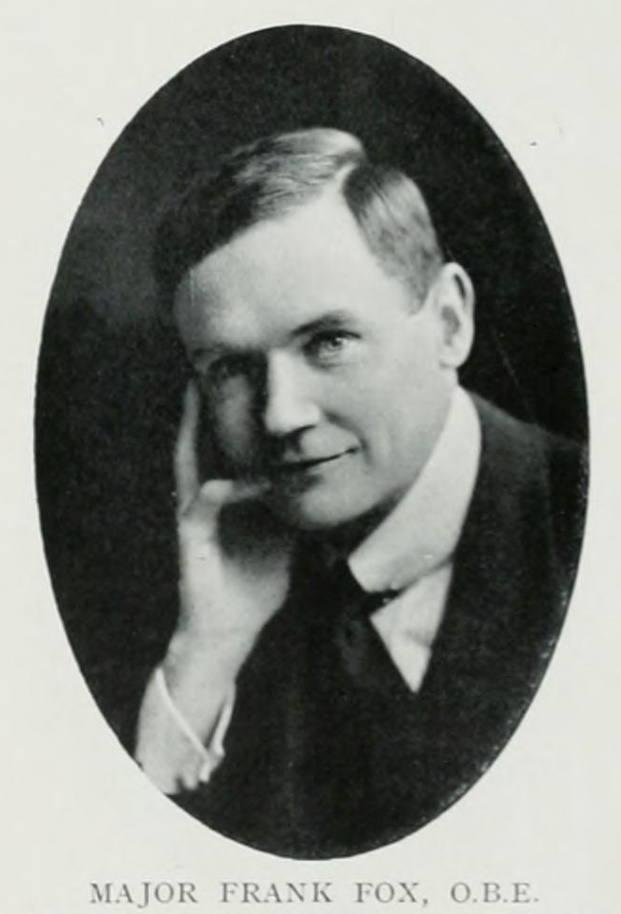
- Photographic portrait of Frank Fox (in about 1922).
- Born: 10 August 1874; Adelaide, South Australia
- Died: 4 March 1960 (aged 85); Chichester, Sussex, England
- Education: Christ College (University of Tasmania)
- Occupations: Journalist, soldier, author and campaigner
- Notable work: The Lone Hand
- Parents: Charles James Fox; Mary Ann

Sir Frank Ignatius Fox (10 August 1874 – 1960) was an Australian-born journalist, soldier, author and campaigner; he lived in Britain from 1909.

== Early life and education ==
Frank Ignatius Fox was born in 1874 in Adelaide, second son of Charles James Fox, one-time Latin teacher, journalist and editor of The Irish Harp and Farmers' Herald, and his wife Mary Ann (née Toole). He moved to Hobart in 1883, when his father became editor of the Tasmanian Mail, and was educated at Christ College. At an early age he wrote paragraphs for his father's paper.

== Career ==
Fox was appointed editor of The Australian Workman in 1893, then in 1895 the (Bathurst) National Advocate, before joining The Age, where he served as chief of their reporting staff. He joined the staff of the Sydney Bulletin in 1901 and was acting editor for a time. As "Frank Renar", he published his first book Bushman and Buccaneer, a memoir of Harry Morant, which became the seminal work for subsequent books, plays and the acclaimed film Breaker Morant.

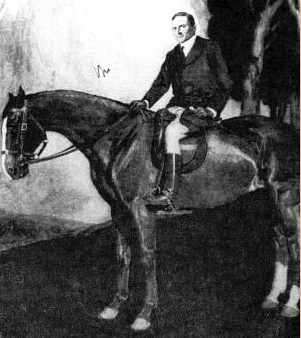
Portrait of Frank Fox by Norman Lindsay

While still working for the Bulletin, Fox served from 1907 to 1909 as first editor and manager of The Lone Hand, a monthly publication of literature and poetry. Fox published a volume of political essays, From the Old Dog (Melbourne), in 1908. He was a keen horseman; riding out regularly with his literary colleagues Andrew Banjo Paterson and Norman Lindsay. In spite of the latter describing him as an "equine exhibitionist", Lindsay painted an equestrian portrait of Fox. This was considered highly unusual, as the subject matter is not in keeping with Lindsay's well-known works.

Lindsay wrote Bohemians of the Bulletin, which is illustrated with his doodles.

Fox was appointed as an assistant editor for the Morning Post in December 1909 and later in 1910, he was promoted as the news editor. He published Ramparts of Empire (1910) about the navy, Australia (1910), The British Empire (1911), Problems of the Pacific (1912) and many travel books.

Motivated by the atrocities he witnessed to the civilian population in Belgium whilst war correspondent for the Morning Post he was commissioned in the Royal Field Artillery on 13 December 1914, over age at 41, and served in France. He was twice wounded in the Battle of the Somme. In 1917–18 he was at the War Office working for MI7, publishing The Battle of the Ridges and The British Army at War, designed to educate the American Public about the British war effort. He then served as Staff Captain at the Quartermaster General's branch, General Headquarters, in France, and wrote a contemporary account of life there (GHQ, Montreuil-sur-Mer).

== Journalist ==
=== Australia (1892–1909) ===
- Editor, The Australian Workman, aged 18
- Editor, National Advocate. Aged 21
- Acting editor, Sydney Bulletin
- Founder, The Lone Hand

=== England (from 1909) ===
- Morning Post
  - News editor 1910
  - War correspondent – 1912 Bulgarian Army in the Balkan War
  - War correspondent – Belgian Army, August–December 1914. German invasion. Reporting to Brussels re atrocities against the civilian population (Order of the Crown of Belgium – in the gift of King Albert).

== Soldier 1905–1919 ==
- Commissioned Australian Field Artillery 1905
- Commissioned RFA 1914/19 – wounded twice at the Somme 1916.
- War Office (1917).
- GHQ – Montreuil-sur-Mer. Staff Officer in QMG Division; then War Office as Major (OBE Military; mentioned in dispatches) (1916–1919).

== Author ==
Australian military historian Craig Wilcox, author of the 2002 book Australia's Boer War, wrote:

Fox was a great man, and concerning Morant I think of him not only as the launcher of an Australian legend but also its subtlest and most intelligent storyteller; he confounds Morant's champions as well as Morant's detractors, as good literature and insider history ought to do. His little book [Bushman and Buccaneer: A Memoir of Harry Morant] is often cited, sometimes plundered, but too rarely read.

== Campaigner ==
=== Australia ===
- Championed Australian federation (as editor of the National Advocate)

=== Britain ===
- Warned of danger of war in Europe (1909–1914) and urged preparation – in print and public platform
- MI7 (1917) to encourage US participation in World War I
- As an imperialist and a champion of Empire causes, organised:
  - British Empire Cancer Campaign
  - Empire Rheumatism Council
  - Fellowship of British Empire Exhibition (for which he was knighted in 1926)

== Family and personal life ==
He married Helena Clint (d. 1958) on 13 June 1894; they had a son and two daughters. Helena Clint was granddaughter of Alfred Clint, President of the Society of British Artists, great-granddaughter of George Clint ARA, and great-niece of Scipio Clint.

Former Conservative Member of Parliament Charles Goodson-Wickes is Frank Fox's great-grandson and literary executor.

== Bibliography ==
- 1902 – Bushman and Buccaneer: a memoir of Harry Morant, Frank Renar, H. T. Dunn, Australia
- 1908 – From the Old Dog, Lothian, Melbourne, Australia
- 1909 – The Australian Crisis, written under the pseudonym C. H. Kirmess
- 1910 – Australia, illustrations by Percy Spence, Black
- 1910 – Ramparts of Empire; a view of the Navy from an Imperial Standpoint, Black
- 1911 – Australia: Peeps at many lands, Black
- 1911 – The British Empire: peeps at many lands (new 1915; 2nd 1929)
- 1911 – Oceania: Peeps at many lands, Black, new edition 1915
- 1912 – Problems of the Pacific, Williams and Norgate
- 1912 – The Tyranny of Trade Unions, Eveleigh Nash
- 1913 – Naturalist in Cannibal Land, AS Meek (ed. F. Fox), Fisher, Unwin
- 1913 – Our English Land Muddle; an Australian view, Nelson
- 1914 – England, Black
- 1914 – Switzerland, Black
- 1915 – The Balkan Peninsula, Black
- 1915 – The Agony of Belgium (being Phase 1 of the Great War), Hutchinson (republished in 2014 as The Agony of Belgium: The Invasion of Belgium, August–December 1914 by Charles Goodson-Wickes, his great grandson and literary executor). Reviewed July 2016 in The Guards Magazine.
- 1915 – Bulgaria, Black
- 1915 – Italy, Black
- 1918 – The Battle of the Ridges: Arras to Messines (March–June 1917), Pearson
- 1918 – The British Army at War, Unwin
- 1920 – GHQ (Montreuil-sur-mer), GSO, P. Allan. French edition republished in 2015. English edition republished in 2016 by Charles Goodson-Wickes. Reviewed July 2016 in The Guards Magazine, and in December 2016 in The RUSI Journal.
- 1922 – The King's Pilgrimage, Hodder & Stoughton (Fox accompanying George V and Field Marshal Earl Haig to the opening of Belgian and French military cemeteries in 1922) – republished 2017
- 1923 – The History of the Royal Gloucestershire Hussars Yeomanry 1898–1922 (The Great Cavalry Campaign in Palestine), P. Allan
- 1923 – Beneath an Ardent Sun, Hodder & Stoughton
- 1923 – The English 1909–1922: a gossip, Murray
- 1924 – The British Empire Exhibition, Wembley, Official Guide, in collaboration with Grant Cook
- 1926 – Finland Today, Black; new edition 1928
- 1927 – Italy Today, H Jenkins
- 1928 – The Mastery of the Pacific: can the British Empire and the United States agree? Seams, New York, 1928
- 1928 – The Royal Inniskilling Fusiliers in the World War, Constable
- 1930 – Parliamentary Government: a failure?, S. Paul
- 1937 – The Royal House of Windsor 1837–1937 (edited), Royal Warrant Holders Association
- 1951 – The Royal Inniskilling Fusiliers in the Second World War, 1939–45
