= Laurence Sheil =

Irish Catholic bishop (1814–1872)

The Right Reverend Laurence Bonaventure Sheil, OFM
- Bishop of Adelaide
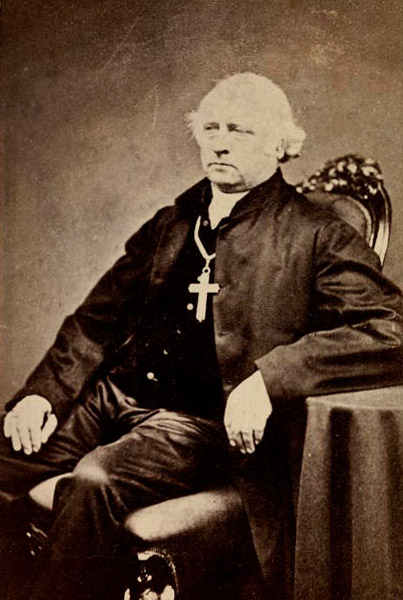
- Diocese: Adelaide
- Installed: 16 September 1866
- Term ended: 1 March 1872
- Predecessor: Bishop Patrick Geoghegan OFM
- Successor: Archbishop Christopher Reynolds

Orders
- Ordination: 1839
- Consecration: 15 August 1866

Personal details
- Born: 24 December 1815 Wexford, Ireland, United Kingdom of Great Britain and Ireland
- Died: 1 March 1872 (aged 56) Willunga, South Australia, British Empire

Laurence Bonaventure Sheil OFM (24 December 1815 – 1 March 1872) was an Irish Franciscan friar, who served as the third Roman Catholic Bishop of Adelaide. Born in Ireland, he was educated at St Peter's College, Wexford, and at the Franciscan College of St Isidore, Rome, Sheil was sent to the British Colony of New South Wales in Australia after being ordained a priest. There, he served as an educator and administrator, before poor health saw him move to Ballarat as archdeacon. His surname was frequently mis-spelled as "Shiel".

In 1866, Sheil became the third Bishop of Adelaide. His reign was characterised by poor administration, with his extensive absence from the diocese contributing to severe factionalism within the clergy. Sheil's mismanagement culminated in his excommunication of Mary MacKillop, who later became Australia's first saint. He died in March 1872, rescinding his excommunication of MacKillop on his deathbed.

== Early life ==
Sheil was born on 24 December 1815 in Wexford, Ireland. From 1832, he attended the Franciscan College of St Isidore in Rome, where he taught after he was ordained in 1839. After serving as guardian of the convents of St Francis at Cork and Carrickbeg, Sheil travelled to Melbourne, Australia, arriving on 12 February 1853. There, he served as the secretary and manager of the Victorian Catholic education board, and taught at a Melbourne seminary. Sheil's failing health saw him moved to Ballarat in 1859, where he became archdeacon. In 1866 he was chosen to replace Patrick Geoghegan as Bishop of Adelaide.

== Episcopacy ==
After being consecrated on 15 August 1866 by the Bishop of Melbourne, James Goold, Sheil was installed as Bishop of Adelaide on 16 September, that year.

The diocese of Australia expanded significantly during Sheil's term as bishop. The number of priests rose from 17 to 30, and a number of new parishes were founded. The founding of the Sisters of St. Joseph in 1866 by Mary Mackillop and Julian Tenison Woods contributed to a large improvement in Catholic education within the diocese. Sheil appointed Woods as the director general of Catholic education in the diocese, and by 1871, there were 71 Catholic schools in the diocese, more than half run by the Josephites.

Although Sheil had been an effective educator in Victoria, his episcopacy was characterised by weak leadership and poor administration. His travels to Europe to recruit priests and attend the First Vatican Council meant that he spent less than two years of his six-year reign in the diocese. In the absence of effective leadership, clergy disunity became rife, with a factional grouping forming around the Franciscan priest Charles Horan. In 1871, when Sheil returned from a visit to Europe, Horan's faction alleged that the Josephites were incompetent and ignorant, petitioning him to take direct control of the order. Sheil, who was increasingly acting under Horan's influence, demoted Tenison Woods from his administrative position within the diocese, disbanded the Josephite novitiate and sought to bring the charitable activities and schools operated by the Sisters of St. Joseph under the direct control of local bishops. In doing so, he removed Tenison Woods and MacKillop from their positions of influence within the order. MacKillop refused to submit, and in response, Sheil excommunicated her for disobedience. C. J. Fox, editor and proprietor of the Catholic Irish Harp newspaper ran an article highly critical of the bishop's treatment of MacKillop and her order. Fox was then ousted by the Catholic Association, of which he was president, for his candid criticism of Catholic hierarchy. These events were reported by the mainstream Register, the outcome of which was a number of "Letters to the Editor" sympathetic to MacKillop, who was well respected by Catholics and Protestants alike.

A group of Catholic laymen wrote to Cardinal Alessandro Barnabò, Prefect of the Congregation of the Propagation of the Faith in Rome. The letter was strongly critical of Sheil's excommunication of MacKillop, the management of diocesan finances and impropriety within the clergy.

Throughout early 1872, Sheil's health deteriorated seriously, a fact that was denied by his personal physician. On his deathbed in Willunga, he rescinded his excommunication of MacKillop, claiming he had been betrayed by his advisors. He died of a carbuncle on 1 March 1872.

== Legacy ==
After Sheil's death, two reports into his episcopacy and the state of the Diocese of Adelaide were conducted. The first, written by a Jesuit priest in the diocese to his Father-General in Rome, was fiercely critical of Sheil's recruitment of priests from Ireland. Of the 21 priests he had brought to the diocese, the report stated that one had died, one had such poor health as to be useless, five had been dismissed for impropriety, five had insufficient knowledge to be effective as priests and six had become involved in diocesan factionalism. Not only, the report alleged, had only two of the twenty-one recruited priests been useful, but many of them had known deficiencies before Sheil recruited them.

The second report, commissioned by the Congregation of the Propagation of the Faith, was conducted by Bishop of Hobart Daniel Murphy and Bishop of Bathurst Matthew Quinn. Murphy and Quinn travelled around the diocese, inspecting parishes and collecting evidence. Having concluded their investigations, they expelled Charles Horan and other factional leaders from the diocese, and recommended Christopher Reynolds (who had been acting as administrator of the Diocese since Sheil's death) be appointed as the next Bishop of Adelaide.

Sheil and his predecessor Patrick Geoghegan were memorialised by Archbishop Reynolds in a pair of leadlight windows for St Francis Xavier's Cathedral. The windows, fabricated in Adelaide by Montgomery & Grimbly, depict their patronymic saints Patrick and Laurence.
