= The Lone Hand (magazine) =

Australian magazine

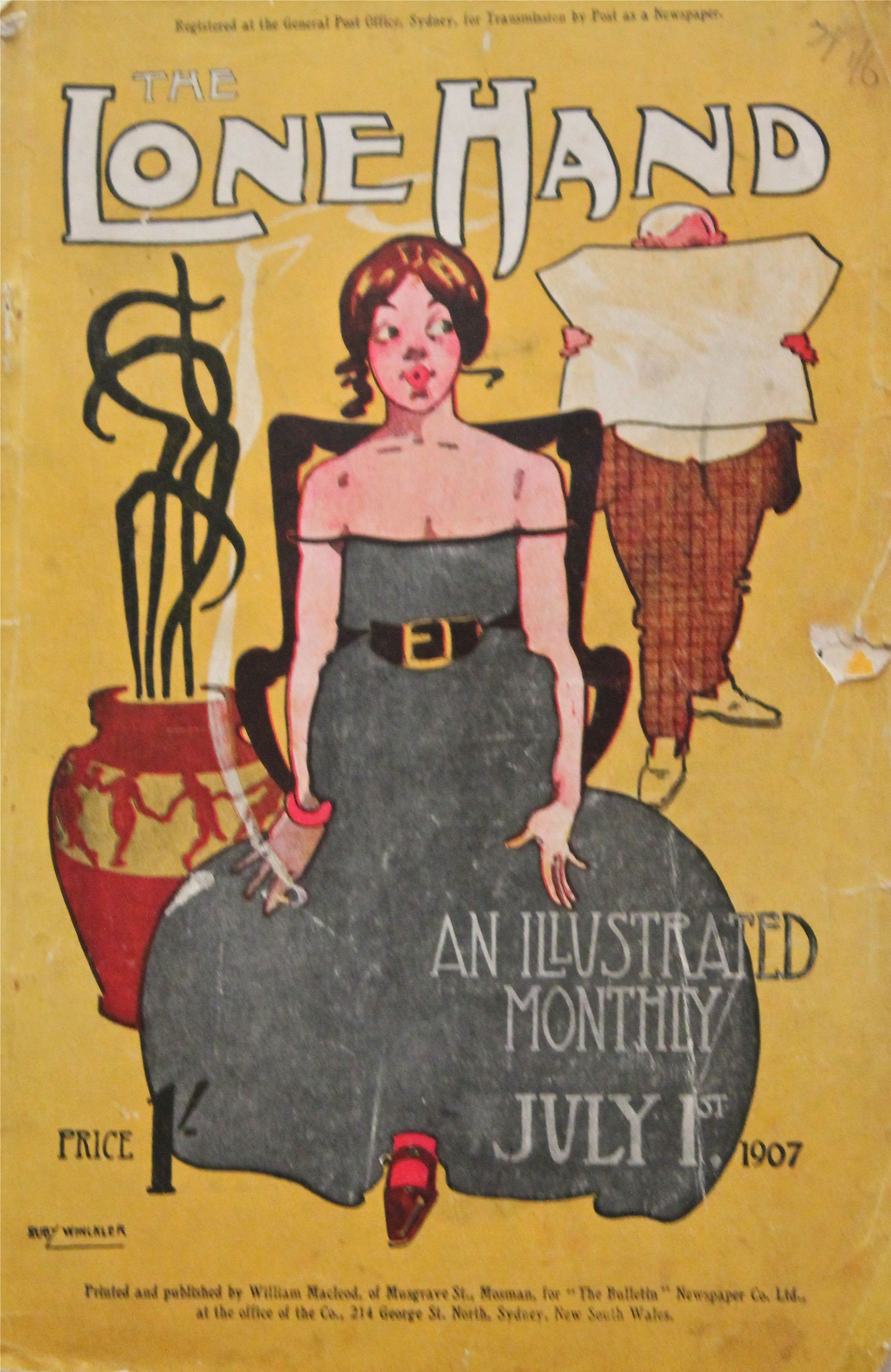
- Cover of the July 1907 edition
- Former editors: J. F. Archibald; Frank Fox; A. H. Adams; Bertram Stevens; Walter Jago
- Categories: Literature and poetry
- Frequency: Monthly
- Founder: J. F. Archibald; Frank Fox
- Founded: 1907
- First issue: May 1907; 117 years ago
- Final issue: February 1928
- Country: Australia
- Based in: Sydney

The Lone Hand was a monthly Australian magazine of literature and poetry published between 1907 and 1928. The magazine was based in Sydney.

== History ==
The Lone Hand was founded in 1907 by J. F. Archibald and Frank Fox as a monthly Australian magazine of literature and poetry as a sister magazine to The Bulletin. It was modelled on The London Strand. Originally, Archibald had wanted the name Lone Hand for what became The Bulletin. Once the magazine was established, Archibald had little to do with its running. It tended to echo the themes of The Bulletin; Australian individuality and mateship, and support for the White Australia Policy.

In common with The Bulletin, contributions from the public were solicited and paid for at the 'going rate'. A remarkable innovation was a prize offered to readers who found errors (including typos) in advertisements and contributions. It also sponsored the first Australian beauty contest in 1908 (after a challenge by the Chicago Tribune), and featured columns by celebrities.

The Lone Hand was an initial success. The first issue in May 1907 sold out its print run of 50,000 copies in three days; the second issue sold out in one. But two years later, faced with falling circulation and advertising revenue, mostly due to competition from overseas magazines, Fox instituted radical changes, adding a women's section and fashion photography. The price of the magazine was also dropped from 1 shilling to 6 pence, and the language used in its editorials was softened to engage a broader audience. In 1914, links with The Bulletin were cut. By 1919 the magazine was being published in a larger format, with more articles on higher quality paper. However, when the price was adjusted again to 9 pence, circulation dropped and continuing the production became unsustainable. February 1928 was the last issue published.

== Contributors ==
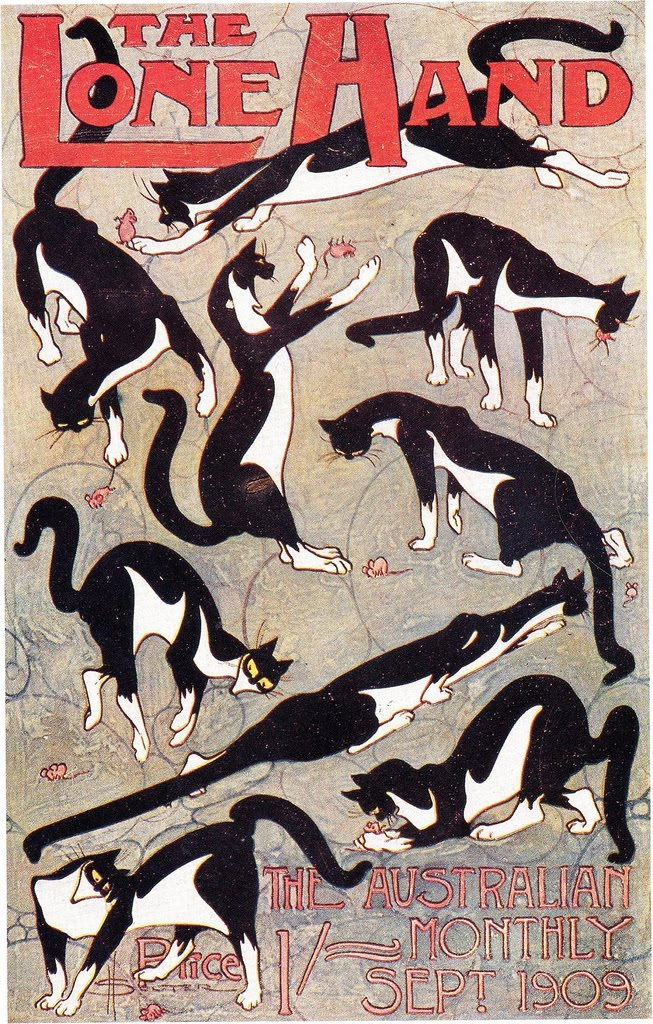
Cover design by David Henry Souter of the September 1909 edition

Major contributors included:

- A. H. Adams
- L W Appleby (photographer)
- Randolph Bedford
- Zora Cross (inc. many pseudonyms)
- Victor Daley
- C J Dennis
- Edward Dyson
- Will Dyson (artist)
- Mabel Forrest
- Henry Lawson
- Lionel Lindsay (artist)
- Norman Lindsay (artist)
- Percy Lindsay (artist)
- David Low (artist)
- Hugh McCrae
- Ernest O'Ferrall
- Dowell O'Reilly
- Ambrose Pratt
- Roderic Quinn
- Steele Rudd The Old Homestead (serialised novel)
- David Henry Souter (artist)
- Louis Stone Betty Wayside (serialised novel)
- J. W. Tristram (artist who contributed poetry under the pseudonym of Tris)
- David McKee Wright (inc. many pseudonyms)
- Blamire Young (artist)

== Editors ==
Editors were:

- J. F. Archibald 1907
- (later Sir) Frank Fox 1907–1909
- A. H. Adams 1909–1911
- Bertram Stevens 1912–1919
- Walter Jago 1919–1928
