= Mary MacKillop =

Australian religious sister and saint (1842–1909)

Saint Mary MacKillop RSJ
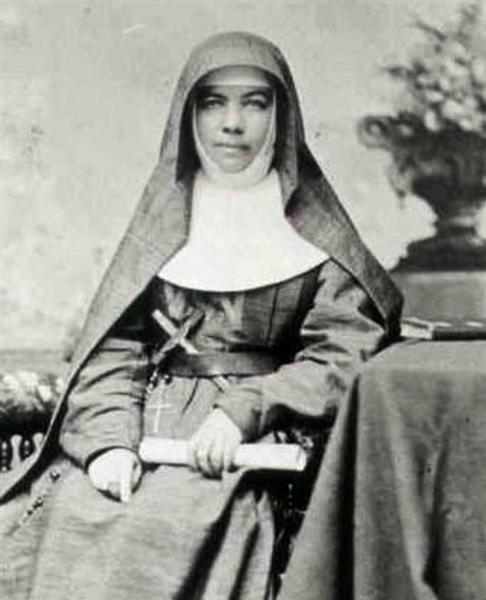
- Mary of the Cross (1869)

Virgin
- Born: 15 January 1842: Newtown, Melbourne, Adelaide (now Fitzroy, Victoria, Australia)
- Died: 8 August 1909 (aged 67); North Sydney, New South Wales, Australia
- Venerated in: Catholic Church
- Beatified: 19 January 1995, Sydney, New South Wales by Pope John Paul II
- Canonized: 17 October 2010, Vatican City by Pope Benedict XVI
- Major shrine: Mary MacKillop Place, North Sydney, New South Wales, Australia
- Feast: 8 August
- Patronage: Australia; Archdiocese of Brisbane; Knights of the Southern Cross

Mary Helen MacKillop RSJ (religious name Mary of the Cross; 15 January 1842 – 8 August 1909) was an Australian religious sister. She was born in Melbourne but is best known for her activities in South Australia. Together with Julian Tenison-Woods, she founded the Sisters of St Joseph of the Sacred Heart (the Josephites), a congregation of religious sisters that established a number of schools and welfare institutions throughout Australia and New Zealand, with an emphasis on education for the rural poor.

The process to have MacKillop declared a saint began in the 1920s, and she was beatified in January 1995 by Pope John Paul II. Pope Benedict XVI prayed at her tomb during his visit to Sydney for World Youth Day 2008 and in December 2009 approved the Catholic Church's recognition of a second miracle attributed to her intercession. She was canonised on 17 October 2010, during a public ceremony in Saint Peter's Square. She is the first Australian Catholic saint. Mary MacKillop is the patron saint of the Archdiocese of Brisbane and of Australia.

== Early life and career ==
Mary Helen MacKillop was born on 15 January 1842 in what is now the Melbourne suburb of Fitzroy, Victoria (at the time part of an area called Newtown in the then British colony of New South Wales), to Alexander MacKillop and Flora MacDonald. Although she continued to be known as "Mary", when she was baptised six weeks later she received the names Maria Ellen.

MacKillop's parents lived in Roybridge (Scottish Gaelic: Drochaid Ruaidh), Lochaber, Inverness-shire, Scotland, prior to emigrating to Australia. Others on both sides of the family had emigrated previously. MacKillop visited the village in the 1870s where St Margaret's, the local parish church of the Roman Catholic Diocese of Argyll and the Isles, now has a shrine to her.

MacKillop's father, Alexander MacKillop, was born in Perthshire. He began his studies for the priesthood at age twelve, and two years later went to the Scots College in Rome; he also studied at Blairs College in Kincardineshire, but at the age of 29 left, just before he was due to be ordained. He migrated to Australia and arrived in Sydney in 1838. MacKillop's mother, Flora MacDonald, born in Fort William, had left Scotland and arrived in Melbourne in 1840. Her father and mother married in Melbourne on 14 July 1840. MacKillop was the eldest of their eight children. Her younger siblings were Margaret ("Maggie", 1843–1872), John (1845–1867), Annie (1848–1929), Alexandrina ("Lexie", 1850–1882), Donald (1853–1925), Alick (who died at 11 months old) and Peter (1857–1878). Donald became a Jesuit priest and worked among the Aboriginal peoples in the Northern Territory. Lexie became a member of the Good Shepherd Sisters in Melbourne.

MacKillop's mother, Flora, was killed on 30 May 1886 when the steamer SS Ly-ee-Moon ran aground and sank at Green Cape on the Far South Coast of New South Wales.

MacKillop was educated at private schools and by her father. She received her First Holy Communion on 15 August 1850 at the age of nine. In February 1851, Alexander MacKillop left his family behind after having mortgaged the farm and their livelihood and made a trip to Scotland lasting some 17 months. Throughout his life he was a loving father and husband but not successful as either a farmer or gold prospector. Consequently, the family faced many hardships.

MacKillop started work at the age of 16 as a clerk in a stationery store in Melbourne. To provide for her needy family, in 1860 she took a job as governess at the estate of her aunt and uncle, Margaret MacKillop Cameron and Alexander Cameron in Penola, South Australia, where she was to look after their children and teach them. Already set on helping the poor whenever possible, she included the other farm children on the Cameron estate as well. This brought her into contact with Julian Tenison-Woods, who had been the parish priest in the south east since his ordination to the priesthood in 1857 after completing his studies at Sevenhill.

MacKillop stayed for two years with the Camerons before accepting a job teaching the children of Portland, Victoria in 1862. Later she taught at the Portland school and after opening her own boarding school, Bay View House Seminary for Young Ladies, now Bayview College, in 1864, was joined by the rest of her family.

== Founding of school and religious congregation ==
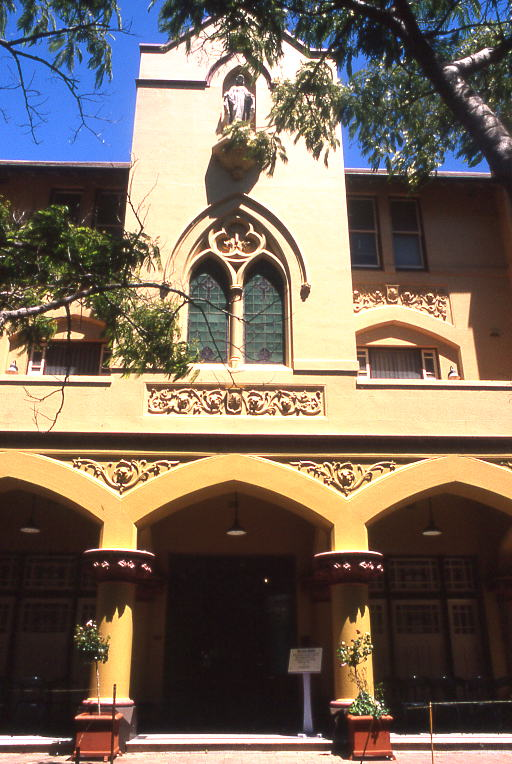
MacKillop museum on Mount Street, North Sydney

In 1866, Julian Tenison-Woods invited MacKillop and her sisters Annie and Lexie to come to Penola and to open a Catholic school. Woods was appointed director of education and became the founder, along with MacKillop, of a school they opened in a stable there. After renovations by their brother, the MacKillops started teaching more than 50 children. At this time MacKillop made a declaration of her dedication to God and began wearing black.

On 21 November 1866, the feast day of the Presentation of Mary, several other women joined MacKillop and her sisters. MacKillop took the religious name Mary of the Cross, and she and Lexie began wearing simple religious habits. The small group began to call themselves the Sisters of St Joseph of the Sacred Heart and moved to a new house in Grote Street, Adelaide. There they founded a new school at the request of the local bishop, Laurence Sheil OFM.

The "rule of life" developed by Woods and MacKillop for the community emphasized poverty, a dependence on divine providence, no ownership of personal belongings, faith that God would provide and willingness to go where needed. The rule of life was approved by Bishop Sheil. By the end of 1867, ten other women had joined the Josephites, who adopted a plain brown religious habit. Due to the colour of their attire and their name, the Josephite sisters became colloquially known as the "Brown Joeys".

== Expansion of the Sisters of St Joseph ==
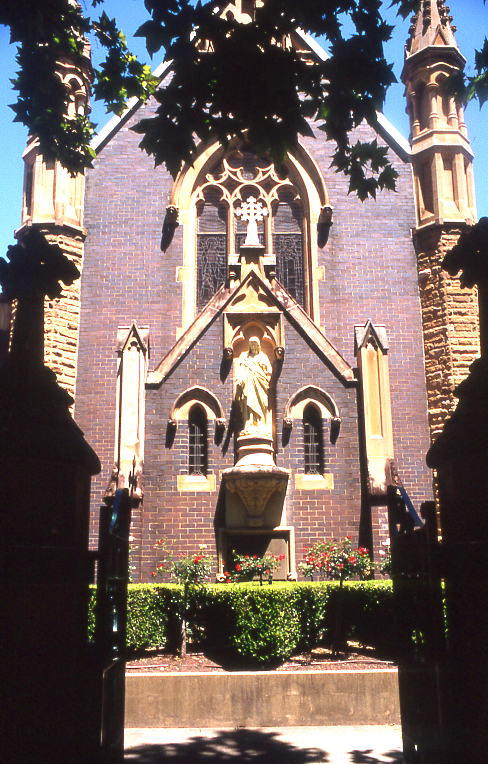
Mary MacKillop Chapel in North Sydney, which holds MacKillop's tomb

In an attempt to provide education to all the poor, particularly in rural areas, a school was opened in Yankalilla, South Australia, in October 1867. By the end of 1869, more than 70 members of the Sisters of St Joseph were educating children at 21 schools in Adelaide and the country. MacKillop and her Josephites were also involved with an orphanage; neglected children; girls in danger; the aged poor; a reformatory (in Johnstown near Kapunda); and a home for the aged and incurably ill. Generally, the Josephite sisters were prepared to follow farmers, railway workers and miners into the isolated outback and live as they lived.

In December 1869, MacKillop and several other sisters travelled to Brisbane to establish the order in Queensland. They were based at Kangaroo Point and took the ferry or rowed across the Brisbane River to attend Mass at St Stephen's Cathedral. Two years later, she was in Port Augusta, South Australia for the same purpose. The Josephite congregation expanded rapidly and, by 1871, 130 sisters were working in more than 40 schools and charitable institutions across South Australia and Queensland.

MacKillop clashed with the Bishop of Brisbane, James Quinn, over the control of the many schools she established; MacKillop believed the sisters should control the schools while Quinn believed the diocese should control them. In 1879, relationships between them had deteriorated to the point that Quinn directed the sisters to leave his diocese. Despite protests by the laity, Quinn was determined and MacKillop and her Josephite sisters had left the diocese by mid-1880 with other Catholic orders taking over the operation of their schools. When the Diocese of Rockhampton was excised from the Brisbane diocese on 29 December 1882, it enabled MacKillop and her sisters to return to Queensland, where they established a school in Clermont and then in other places within the new diocese.

In 1881, Elzear Torreggiani, then Bishop of Armidale and a Capuchin who had worked in both North Wales at Pantasaph and London at Peckham, prior to being consecrated in London in 1879, for the Armidale Diocese; established Mother Mary MacKillop's Sisters of St Joseph at Tenterfield and defended their power of central government at the 1885 Plenary Council.

During the time Torreggiani was Bishop of Armidale the Sisters of St Joseph established foundations at Tenterfield (1880), Inverell (1880), Narrabri (1882), Glen Innes (1883), Uralla (1886), Quirindi (1888), Hillgrove (1889), Tingha (1890), Bingara (1902), Walgett (1902), Warialda (1904) and Manilla (1904). Subsequently, the sisters established Bundarra (1908), Barraba (1910), Boggabri (1911), Tamworth West (1919), Dungowan (1930), Tamworth South (1954), Lightning Ridge (1980), Mungindi (1995) and Attunga (1995). Wee Waa and Werris Creek were also "Motor Mission" centres.

== Excommunication ==
Bishop Sheil spent less than two years of his episcopate in Adelaide and his absences and poor health left the diocese effectively without clear leadership for much of his tenure. This resulted in bitter factionalisms within the clergy and disunity among the lay community. After the founding of the Josephites, Sheil appointed Julian Woods as director general of Catholic education.

In Sept 2010, Paul Gardiner, historian and chaplain with the Mary MacKillop Penola Centre told Australian media that in 1871 Mary MacKillop had been banished following a series of events, including her uncovering and reporting clergy child sex abuse. Gardiner explained that after hearing disturbing stories of alleged child abuse involving Fr Keating of the Kapunda parish in South Australia, MacKillop and other nuns spoke to Father Woods, who in turn approached the Vicar General in Adelaide. As a result, Keating was removed from his parish and sent back to Ireland where he continued as a priest. One of Keating's fellow priests, Father Charles Horan OFM, was so angered by what Woods and the Josephites had exposed, he swore vengeance on them.

In addition to reporting the child abuse, Woods and the Josephites also came into conflict with some clergy over educational matters and local clergy began a campaign to discredit the Josephites. As well as allegations of financial incompetence, rumours were also spread that MacKillop had a drinking problem. A 2010 investigation by Paul Gardiner found no evidence to support these allegations. In fact, it was widely known that she drank alcohol on doctor's orders to relieve the symptoms of dysmenorrhea, which often led to her being bedridden for days at a time. Horan met with Sheil on 21 September 1871 and convinced him that the Josephites' constitution should be changed in a way that could have left the Josephite sisters homeless; the following day, when MacKillop apparently did not accede to the request, Sheil excommunicated her, citing insubordination as the reason. Candid coverage in the Catholic newspaper The Irish Harp and Farmers' Herald earned for its editor C. J. Fox ostracism and expulsion from the Catholic Association of which he was president. Though the Josephites were not disbanded, most of their schools were closed in the wake of this action. Forbidden to have contact with anyone in the church, MacKillop was given the rent-free use of two houses in Flinders Street, Adelaide by prominent Jewish merchant Emanuel Solomon and was also sheltered by Jesuit priests. Some of the sisters chose to remain under diocesan control, becoming popularly known as "Black Joeys".

On his deathbed, Sheil instructed Horan to lift the excommunication on MacKillop. On 21 February 1872, he met her on his way to Willunga and absolved her in the Morphett Vale church. An episcopal commission later completely exonerated her.

== Rome ==
After the acquisition of the Mother House in Kensington in 1872, MacKillop made preparations to leave for Rome to have the "Rule of Life" of the Sisters of St Joseph officially approved.

MacKillop travelled to Rome in 1873 to seek papal approval for the religious congregation and was encouraged in her work by Pope Pius IX. The authorities in Rome made changes to the way Josephite sisters lived in regards to their commitment to poverty and declared that the superior general and her council were the authorities in charge of the congregation. They assured MacKillop that the congregation and their "Rule of Life" would receive final approval after a trial period. The resulting alterations to the "Rule of Life" regarding ownership of property caused a breach between MacKillop and Woods, who felt that the revised document compromised the ideal of vowed poverty and blamed MacKillop for not getting the document accepted in its original form. Before Woods' death on 7 October 1889, he and MacKillop were personally reconciled, but he did not renew his involvement with the congregation.

While in Europe, MacKillop travelled widely to observe educational methods. During this period, the Josephites expanded their operations into New South Wales and New Zealand. MacKillop relocated to Sydney in 1883 on the instruction of Bishop Reynolds of Adelaide.

== Return from Rome ==
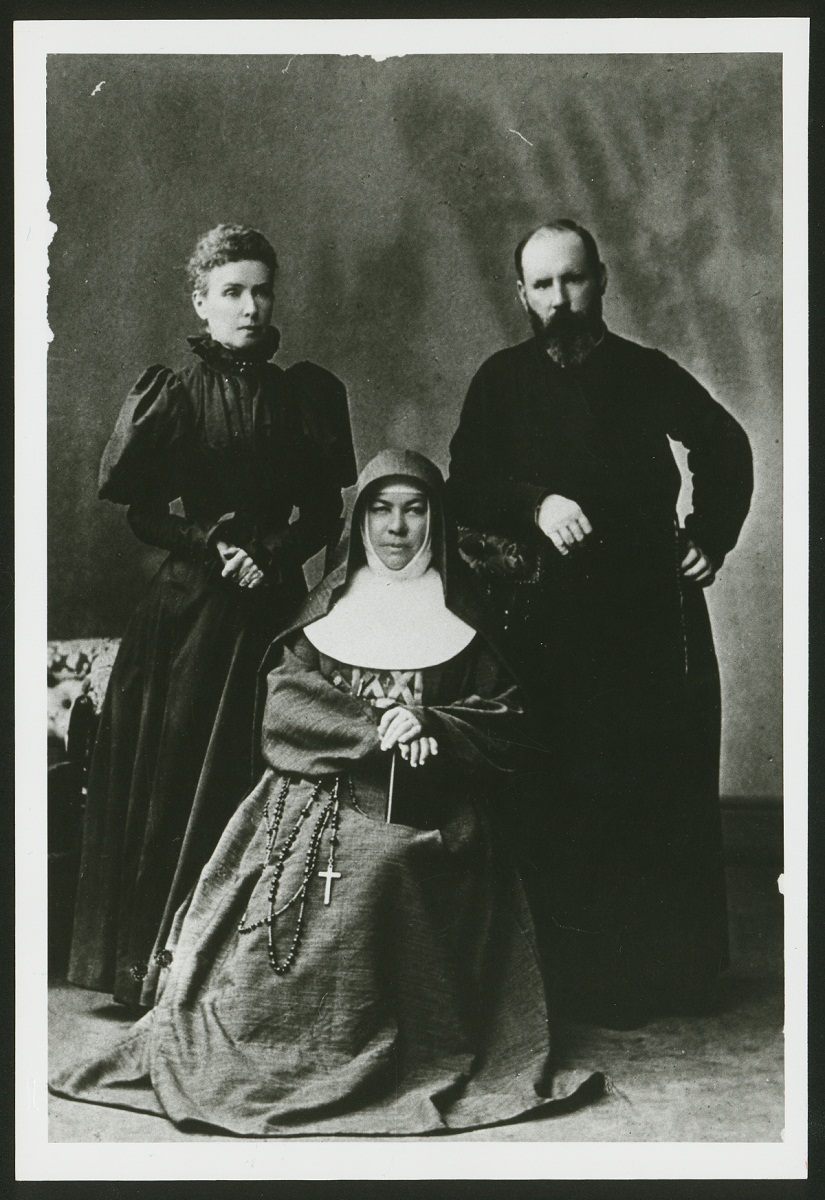
Saint Mary MacKillop, 1890

When MacKillop returned to Australia in January 1875, after an absence of nearly two years, she brought approval from Rome for her sisters and the work they did, materials for her school, books for the convent library, several priests and most of all, 15 new Josephites from Ireland. Regardless of her success, she still had to contend with the opposition of priests and several bishops. This did not change after her unanimous election as superior general in March 1875.

The Josephites were unusual among Catholic church ministries in two ways. Firstly, the sisters lived in the community rather than in convents. Secondly the congregation's constitutions required administration by a superior general chosen from within the congregation rather than by the bishop, which was uncommon in its day. However, the issues which caused friction were that the Josephites refused to accept government funding, would not teach instrumental music (then considered an essential part of education by the church) and were unwilling to educate girls from more affluent families. This structure resulted in the sisters being forced to leave Bathurst in 1876 and Queensland by 1880 due to the local bishops' refusal to accept this working structure.

Notwithstanding all the trouble, the congregation did expand. By 1877, it operated more than 40 schools in and around Adelaide, with many others in Queensland and New South Wales. With the help from Benson, Barr Smith, the Baker family, Emanuel Solomon and other non-Catholics, the Josephites, with MacKillop as their leader and superior general, were able to continue the religious and other good works, including visiting prisoners in jail.

After the appointment of Roger Vaughan as Archbishop of Sydney in 1877, life became a little easier for MacKillop and her sisters. Until his death in 1882, Joseph Tappeiner had given MacKillop his support and, until 1883, she also had the support of Bishop Reynolds of Adelaide. After the death of Vaughan in 1883, Patrick Francis Moran became archbishop. Although he had a somewhat positive outlook toward the Josephites, he removed MacKillop as superior general and replaced her with Bernard Walsh.

Pope Leo XIII gave official approval to the Josephites as a congregation in 1885, with its headquarters in Sydney. Pope Leo XIII gave the final approval to the Sisters of Saint Joseph of the Sacred Heart in 1888.

On 31 May 1886, Mary MacKillop's mother, Flora MacKillop, was travelling from Melbourne to Sydney in the SS Ly-ee-Moon, to visit Mary and another daughter who was also a religious sister. The ship struck a reef near the Green Cape Lighthouse. Flora, along with 70 others, died.

Although still living through alms, the Josephite sisters had been very successful. In South Australia, they had schools in many country towns including, Willunga, Willochra, Yarcowie, Mintaro, Auburn, Jamestown, Laura, Sevenhill, Quorn, Spalding, Georgetown, Robe, Pekina, Appila and several others. MacKillop continued her work for the Josephites in Sydney and tried to provide as much support as possible for those in South Australia. In 1883 the order was successfully established at Temuka in New Zealand, where MacKillop stayed for over a year. In 1880, sisters from Perthville opened a boarding school in Whanganui. In 1889 the community was also established in the Australian state of Victoria.

During all these years MacKillop assisted Mother Bernard with the management of the Sisters of St Joseph. She wrote letters of support, advice and encouragement or just to keep in touch. By 1896, MacKillop was back in South Australia, visiting fellow sisters in Port Augusta, Burra, Pekina, Kapunda, Jamestown and Gladstone. That same year, she travelled again to New Zealand, spending several months in Port Chalmers and Arrowtown in Otago. During her time in New Zealand with the Sisters of St Joseph, a school was established in Arrowtown, near Queenstown, South Island. Located in the grounds of St Patrick's Church, the small yellow cottage now known as Mary MacKillop cottage was originally built as a miner's house around 1870. It was bought by the church and incorporated into the church school in 1882 and then in 1897, MacKillop had the cottage and some of the school converted to a convent for the Sisters of St Joseph of the Sacred Heart who worked in New Zealand.

In 1897, Bishop Maher of Port Augusta arranged for the Sisters of St Joseph to take charge of the St Anacletus Catholic Day School at Petersburg (now Peterborough). MacKillop founded a convent and base for the Sisters of St Joseph in Petersburg on 16 January 1897. "On January 16th, 1897, the founder of the Sisters of St Joseph of the Sacred Heart, Mother Mary of the Cross, arrived in Petersburg to take over the school. She was accompanied by fellow Sisters Benizi (who was placed in charge of the school), M. Joseph, Clotilde and Aloysius Joseph. They were met at the station by the priest Norton who took them to the newly blessed convent, purchased for them on Railway Terrace." The property at 40 Railway Terrace is identified as the convent by a plaque placed by the Catholic diocese of Peterborough.

After the death of Mother Bernard, MacKillop was once more elected unopposed as superior general in 1899, a position she held until her own death. During the later years of her life she had many problems with her health which continued to deteriorate. She developed rheumatism and after a stroke in Auckland, New Zealand, in 1902, became paralysed on her right side. For seven years, she had to rely on a wheelchair to move around, but her speech and mind were as good as ever and her letter writing had continued unabated after she learned to write with her left hand. Even after her stroke, the Josephite nuns had enough confidence in her to re-elect her in 1905.

== Death ==
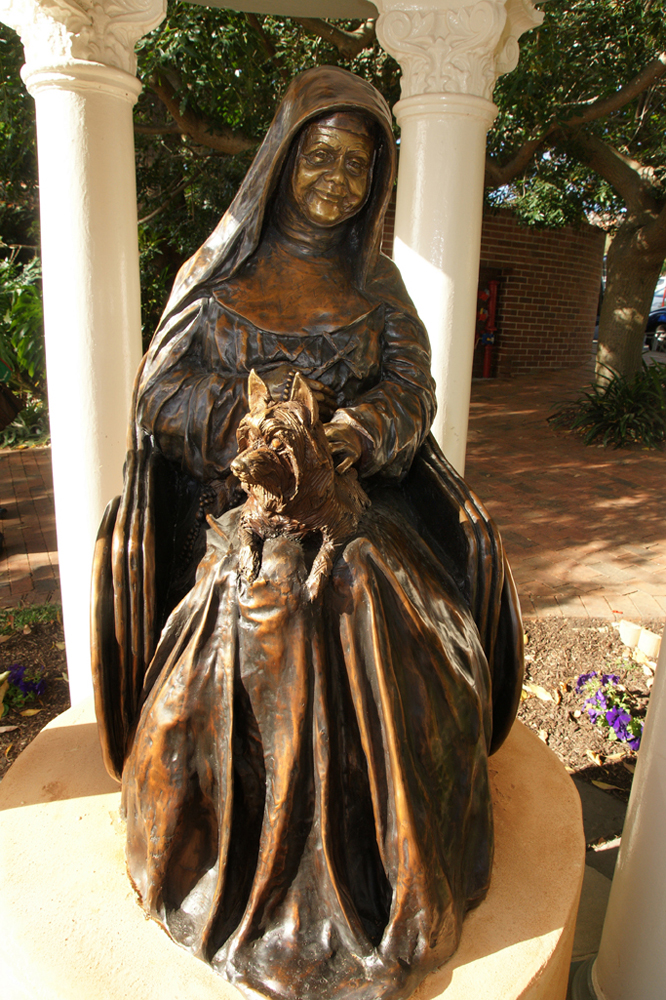
Life-size bronze statue of St Mary Mackillop by sculptor Linda Klarfeld at the Australian Catholic University in North Sydney

Mary MacKillop died on 8 August 1909 at the Josephite convent in North Sydney. The Archbishop of Sydney, Cardinal Moran, said: "I consider this day to have assisted at the deathbed of a saint." She was laid to rest at the Gore Hill Cemetery, a few kilometres up the Pacific Highway from North Sydney.

After MacKillop's burial, people continually took earth from around her grave. As a result, her remains were exhumed and transferred on 27 January 1914 to a vault before the altar of the Virgin Mary in the newly built memorial chapel in Mount Street, North Sydney. The vault was a gift of Joanna Barr Smith, a lifelong friend and admiring Presbyterian.

== Beatification process ==
In 1925, the Mother Superior of the Sisters of St Joseph, Laurence, began the process to have MacKillop declared a saint and Michael Kelly, Archbishop of Sydney, established a tribunal to carry the process forward. The process for MacKillop's beatification began in 1926, was interrupted in 1931 but began again in April 1951 and was closed in September of that year. After several years of hearings, close examination of MacKillop's writings and a 23-year delay, the initial phase of investigations was completed in 1973.

After further investigations, MacKillop's heroic virtue was declared in 1992. That same year, the church endorsed the belief that Veronica Hopson, apparently dying of leukaemia in 1961, was cured by praying for MacKillop's intercession; MacKillop was beatified on 19 January 1995 by Pope John Paul II. For the occasion of the beatification, the Croatian-Australian artist Charles Billich was commissioned to paint MacKillop's official commemorative.

On 19 December 2009, the Congregation for the Causes of Saints issued a papal decree formally recognising a second miracle, the complete and permanent cure of Kathleen Evans of inoperable lung and secondary brain cancer in the 1990s. Kathleen Evans went on to publish in 2012 with Penguin Books, "The Story Behind Saint Mary MacKillop's second Miracle." Her canonisation was announced on 19 February 2010 and subsequently took place on 17 October 2010.

== Recognition ==
In the week leading up to her canonisation, the Australian federal government announced that it was protecting the use of MacKillop's name for commercial purposes. According to a statement from the office of the Prime Minister of Australia, Julia Gillard, the only other individual Australian whose name has similar protection is Australian cricket legend Sir Donald Bradman. Australia Post issued an official postage stamp to recognise MacKillop's canonisation.

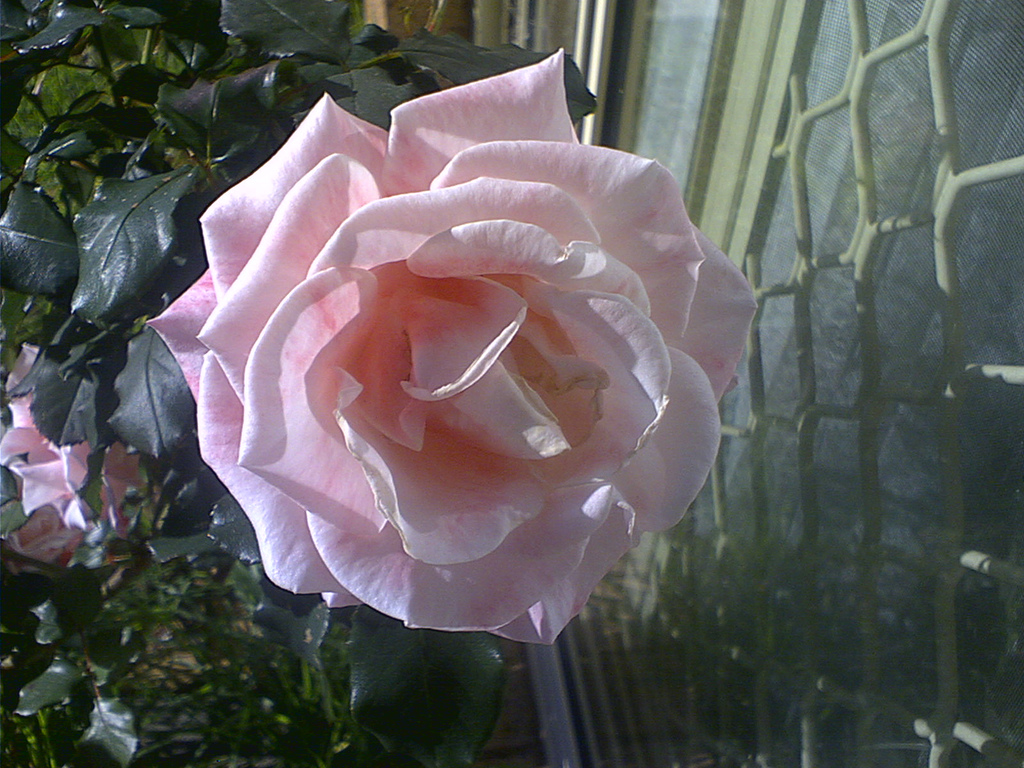
The Mary MacKillop rose

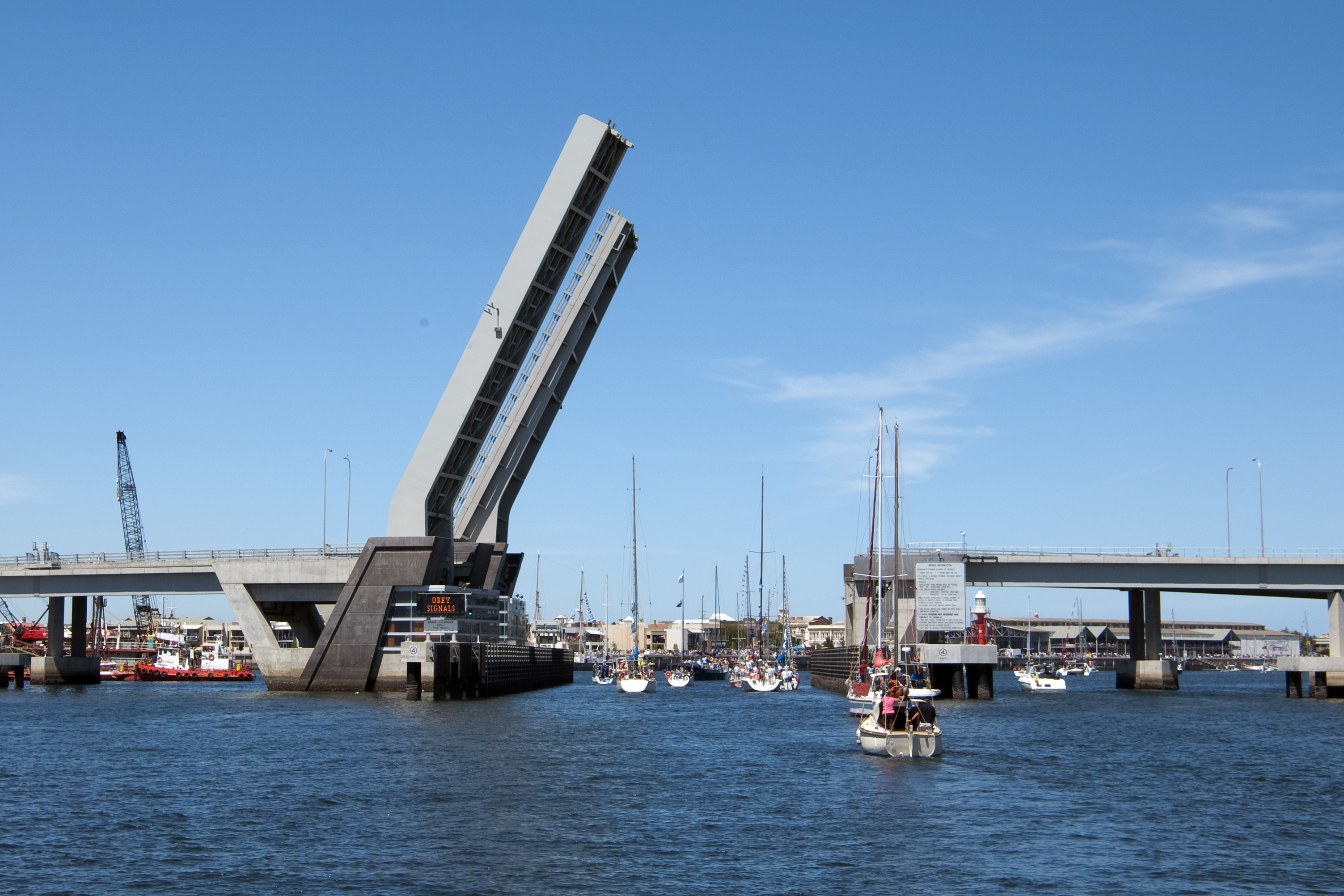
The rail portion of the Tom 'Diver' Derrick Bridge, which opened in Port River, Port Adelaide in 2008, is named after MacKillop

An estimated 8,000 Australians were present in Vatican City to witness the ceremony. The Vatican Museum held an exhibition of Aboriginal art to honour the occasion titled "Rituals of Life". The exhibition contained 300 artifacts which were on display for the first time since 1925.

MacKillop is remembered in numerous ways, particularly in Australia. Things named for her include the electoral district of MacKillop in South Australia and several MacKillop colleges. In 1985, the Sisters of St Joseph approached one of Australia's foremost rose growers to develop the Mary MacKillop Rose. MacKillop was the subject of the first of the "Inspirational Australians" one dollar coin series, released by the Royal Australian Mint in 2008. She was posthumously inducted onto the Victorian Honour Roll of Women in 2001.

Several Australian composers have written sacred music to celebrate MacKillop. For the occasion of her beatification the MacKillop Secretariat commissioned eight composers in 1994 to write some of the first liturgical hymns to MacKillop. These were published in 1995 by the Secretariat as an anthology entitled If I Could Tell The Love of God. Hymns specifically used in St Mary of the Cross celebrations include A Saint for Today and Mary MacKillop, Woman of Australia by Josephite Sister Margaret Cusack and If I Could Tell The Love of God, In Love God Leads Us and Psalm 103 by Jesuit Priest Christopher Willcock.

In 2009 Nicholas Buc was commissioned by the Shire of Glenelg to write an hour-long cantata mass for the centenary of the death of MacKillop. It was premiered by the Royal Melbourne Philharmonic in Portland, Victoria. The Mass of Mary McKillop is a setting for congregational singing, composed by Joshua Cowie.

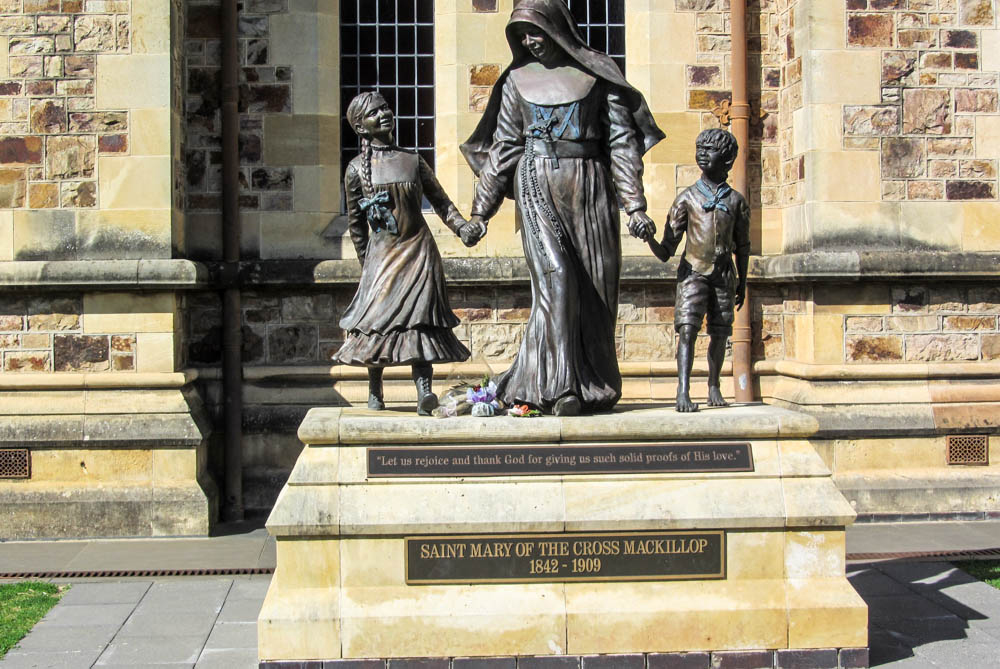
Statue of Mary MacKillop outside St Francis Xavier's Cathedral, Adelaide

In 2018 The University of Scranton in Scranton, Pennsylvania renamed a residence hall after Mary MacKillop. The building which used to be McCormick Hall is now MacKillop Hall.

== In popular culture ==
MacKillop is also the subject of several artistic productions, including

- 1994 film Mary, directed by Kay Pavlou with Lucy Bell as MacKillop; released on DVD as Mary: The Mary MacKillop Story
- That very Troublesome Woman: The Dramatic Search for Mary MacKillop (1987); recreation of interviews with Mackillop and Woods by "Vagabond" (Sydney journalist Stanley James); written by Dion Boehme, produced and directed by John Mabey. Neil Fitzpatrick as Woods, William Upjohn as James and Les Foxcroft as Ship's Purser. DVD by Flashback Entertainment Cat. 17925.
- Blessed Mary; A Foxtel/History Channel production, hosted by Alan Jones, inc. interviews with Cardinal Pell. DVD by Universal.
- Her Holiness, a play by Justin Fleming;
- MacKillop, a dramatic musical created by Victorian composer Xavier Brouwer and first performed for pilgrims at World Youth Day 2008 in Melbourne.
- Novelist Pamela Freeman's The Black Dress is a fictionalised biography of MacKillop's childhood and young adulthood.
- At the Centre of Light by Rosemary Johns, seeded at Explorations (La Mama), had a regional Victorian tour. It was read in part with international and Indian actors at WPI Mumbai, and was later commercially produced at 12th Night Theatre Brisbane, 2010. An extract of the play was published in Scenes from a Diverse World anthology (published by the International Centre for Women Playwrights, U.S.A.) The play about MacKillop was written with permission and support of the Josephite Sisters in East Melbourne and is available at Australianplays.org

In 2000, the State Transit Authority named a Sydney Harbour SuperCat ferry after MacKillop. In 2008, a railway bridge in Adelaide was named Mary MacKillop Bridge.

== See also ==
- Josephite Community Aid
- List of Catholic saints
