= Sisters of St Joseph of the Sacred Heart =

Roman Catholic female teaching order

The Sisters of St Joseph of the Sacred Heart, often called the Josephites or Brown Joeys, is a Catholic religious institute founded by Saint Mary MacKillop (1842–1909). Members of the congregation use the postnominal initials RSJ (Religious Sisters of St Joseph).

The order was founded in Penola, South Australia, in 1866 by Saint Mary MacKillop and the Rev. Julian Tenison Woods.

The centre of the congregation is at Mary MacKillop Place, Mount Street, North Sydney, New South Wales, where Saint Mary MacKillop's tomb is enshrined in the Mary MacKillop Memorial Chapel.

As of August 2026, there are around 500 Sisters living and working throughout Australia and New Zealand, as well as in Ireland, Peru and Brazil. As of August 2026 the current Congregational Leader is Sr Josephine Dubiel, who is supported by four other Sisters who constitute the Congregational Leadership Team.

Besides the main centre at North Sydney, the Josephites, who were named after Saint Joseph, have Mary MacKillop Spirituality Centres' in the Adelaide suburb of Kensington, South Australia; East Melbourne, Victoria; Williamstown, Victoria; Hobart, Tasmania; Shoalwater, Western Australia; and the Sydney suburb of Norwest. There is also a centre at Penola, South Australia. The Australian-New Zealand Federation of the Sisters of Saint Joseph includes congregations in Perthville and Lochinvar in New South Wales.

== History ==
=== 1866: Founding ===
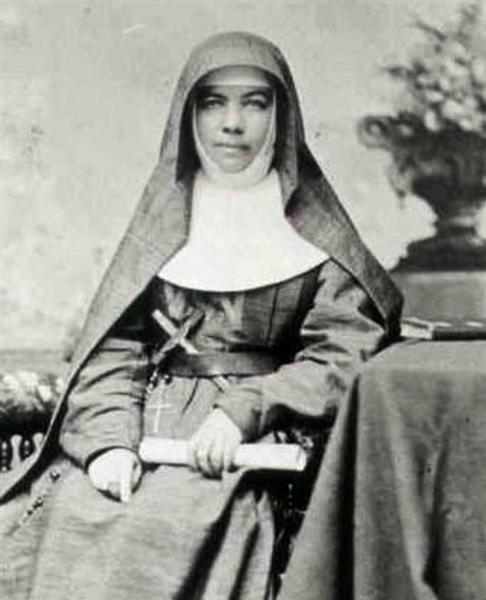
Saint Mary MacKillop

Fr Julian Tenison Woods had been very concerned about the lack of education, particularly Catholic education, in South Australia. In 1866, he invited MacKillop and her sisters Annie and Lexie to come to Penola and open a Catholic school. Woods was appointed Director of Catholic education for South Australia and became the founder, along with MacKillop, of a school they opened in a stable there. After renovations by their brother, the MacKillops started teaching more than 50 children. At this time MacKillop made a declaration of her dedication to God and began wearing black.

In 1867, MacKillop became the first member and superior general (SG) of the newly formed religious congregation of the Sisters of St Joseph of the Sacred Heart, and moved to a new convent in Grote Street, Adelaide. In the same year, at age 25, she adopted the religious name 'Sister Mary of the Cross'. In Adelaide they founded a new school at the request of the bishop, Laurence Bonaventure Sheil, OFM. Dedicated to the "Catholic education of poor children", it was the first religious institute to be founded by an Australian. The Rule of Life developed by Woods and MacKillop for the convent emphasised poverty, a dependence on divine providence, no ownership of personal belongings and faith that God would provide, and willingness to go where needed. The Rule was approved by Sheil. Near the end of 1867, ten other women had joined the Josephites, who had adopted a plain brown religious habit. In consequence, the Josephite sisters became colloquially known as the 'Brown Joeys'.

=== 1866–1880s: Expansion ===
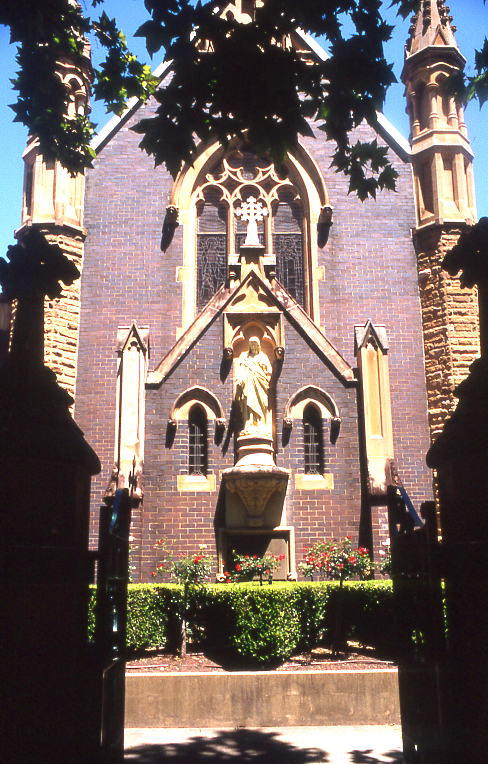
Mary MacKillop Chapel in North Sydney, which holds MacKillop's tomb

With the mission of providing a "Catholic education of poor children", particularly in country areas, the Sisters opened a school at Yankalilla, South Australia, in October 1867. By the end of 1869, more than 70 Josephite Sisters were educating children at 21 schools in Adelaide and the country. MacKillop and her Josephites were also involved with an orphanage; neglected children; girls in danger; the aged poor; a reformatory (in St Johns near Kapunda); a home for the aged; and the incurably ill.

In December 1869, MacKillop and several other Sisters travelled to Brisbane to establish the congregation in Queensland. They were based at Kangaroo Point and took the ferry or rowed across the Brisbane River to attend Mass at old St Stephen's Cathedral. Two years later she was in Port Augusta, South Australia, for the same purpose. The Josephite congregation expanded rapidly and, by 1871, 130 Sisters were working in more than 40 schools and charitable institutions across South Australia and Queensland.

After the acquisition of the Mother House at Kensington in 1872, MacKillop made preparations to leave for Rome to have the Rule of the Sisters of Saint Joseph approved by the Holy See. She travelled to Rome in 1873 and was encouraged in her work by Pope Pius IX. The authorities in Rome made changes to the way Josephites lived in poverty, declared that the Superior General and her Council were the authorities in charge of the institute, and assured MacKillop that the congregation and their Rule of Life would receive final approval after a trial period. The resulting softening of the Rule caused a breach between MacKillop and Woods, who felt that the revised Rule compromised the ideal of vowed poverty and blamed MacKillop for not getting the Rule accepted in its original form. The congregation became divided, with Woods' followers becoming known as the 'Black Josephites', for their black habits, while MacKillop's followers donned brown habits, and were known as the 'Brown Josephites'. Before Woods' death on 7 October 1889, he and MacKillop were personally reconciled, but he did not renew his involvement with the congregation.

While in Europe, MacKillop travelled widely to observe educational methods.

When she returned in January 1875, after an absence of nearly two years, she brought approval from Rome for her Sisters and the work they did, materials for her school, books for the convent library, several priests, and most of all 15 new Josephites from Ireland. Regardless of her success, she still had to contend with the opposition of priests and several bishops. This did not change after her unanimous election as superior general in March 1875. During this period, the Josephites expanded their operations into New South Wales and New Zealand. MacKillop relocated to Sydney in 1883 on the instruction of Bishop Reynolds of Adelaide.

The Josephites were unique among Catholic church ministries in two ways. Firstly, the Sisters lived in the community rather than in convents. Secondly, the congregation's constitution required administration by a superior general rather than being subject to the local bishop, a situation unique in its day. This structure resulted in the institute being forced to leave Bathurst in 1876 and Queensland by 1880 due to their respective bishop's refusal to accept this administrative structure.

Notwithstanding all the trouble, the institute expanded. By 1877 it operated more than 40 schools in and around Adelaide, with many others in Queensland and New South Wales. With the help from Benson, Barr Smith, the Baker family, Emanuel Solomon, and other non-Catholics, the Josephites, with MacKillop as their superior general, were able to continue the religious and other good works, including visiting prisoners in jail.

=== 1883: Sister Bernard becomes SG ===
Sydney's Archbishop Roger Vaughan died in 1883 and was succeeded by Patrick Francis Moran. Although he had a somewhat positive outlook toward the Josephites, he removed MacKillop as superior general and replaced her with Sister Bernard Walsh.

Pope Leo XIII made the Josephites into a religious congregation of Pontifical right in 1885, with its headquarters in Sydney. He gave the final approval to the Sisters of Saint Joseph of the Sacred Heart in 1888.

Although still living through alms, the Josephite sisters had been very successful. In South Australia they had schools in many country towns including Willunga, Willochra, Yarcowie, Mintaro, Auburn, Jamestown, Laura, Sevenhill, Quorn, Spalding, Georgetown, Robe, Pekina, and Appila. MacKillop continued her work for the Josephites in Sydney and tried to provide as much support as possible for those in South Australia. In 1883 the institute was successfully established at Temuka in New Zealand, where MacKillop stayed for over a year. In 1889 it was also established in the Australian state of Victoria.

During all these years MacKillop assisted Mother Bernard with the management of the Sisters of Saint Joseph. She wrote letters of support, advice, and encouragement or just to keep in touch. By 1896, MacKillop was back in South Australia visiting fellow Sisters in Port Augusta, Burra, Pekina, Kapunda, Jamestown, and Gladstone. That same year she travelled again to New Zealand, spending several months in Port Chalmers and Arrowtown in Otago. During her time in New Zealand the Sisters of Saint Joseph established a school in the South Island. In 1897, Bishop Maher of Port Augusta arranged for the Sisters of Saint Joseph to take charge of the St Anacletus Catholic Day School in Petersburg (now Peterborough).

MacKillop founded a convent and base for the Sisters of Saint Joseph in Petersborough on 16 January 1897. "On January 16th, 1897, the founder of the Sisters of St Joseph of the Sacred Heart, Mother Mary of the Cross, arrived in Peterborough to take over the school. She was accompanied by Sister Benizi (who was placed in charge of the school), Sister M. Joseph, Sister Clotilde, and Sister Aloysius Joseph. They were met at the station by Rev. Father Norton who took them to the newly blessed convent, purchased for them on Railway Terrace." The property at 40 Railway Terrace is identified as the convent by a plaque placed by the Diocese of Peterborough.

=== 1889–1909: Illness and death of Mary MacKillop ===
After the death of Mother Bernard, MacKillop was once more elected unopposed as superior general in 1899, a position she held until her own death. During the later years of her life she had many problems with her health which continued to deteriorate. She suffered from rheumatism and after a stroke in Auckland, New Zealand, in 1902, became paralysed on her right side. For seven years she had to rely on a wheelchair to move around, but her speech and mind were as good as ever and her letter writing had continued unabated after she learned to write with her left hand. Even after suffering the stroke, she inspired enough confidence among the Josephites that she was re-elected in 1905.

MacKillop died on 8 August 1909 in the Josephite convent in North Sydney. The Archbishop of Sydney, Cardinal Moran, stated that he had that day "assisted at the deathbed of a Saint". She was laid to rest at the Gore Hill Cemetery, a few kilometres up the Pacific Highway from North Sydney. After MacKillop's burial, people continually took earth from around her grave. As a result, her remains were exhumed and transferred on 27 January 1914 to a vault before the altar of the Virgin Mary in the newly built memorial chapel on Mount Street, Sydney. The vault was a gift of Joanna Barr Smith, a lifelong friend and admiring Presbyterian.

=== 20th century ===
The wide network of schools and community aid organisations established by the Sisters continued to expand throughout Australasia and elsewhere during the 20th century. While vocations within Australia suffered along with other religious institutes in the latter 20th century, its work continued and global recognition came with the canonisation of Mary MacKillop in 2010.

Since 1979, the Congregations of St Joseph, made up of all the Sisters of Saint Joseph and Associates throughout the world, have had a presence at the United Nations as a Non-Governmental Organisation (NGO). In 1999, the Congregations of St Joseph gained accreditation with the Economic and Social Council of the United Nations, allowing them access to other UN programs and agencies. As an NGO its focus is poverty, empowering women and children, ecology, environment, and immigrants.

== 21st century ==
The number of Sisters teaching in schools and vocations in general have declined in Australia; however, the congregation has Incorporated Works meeting the needs of today, including:

- Mary MacKillop Spirituality Ministry - offering experiences for the whole community within spaces that inspire, connect and renew
- Mary MacKillop Today - life-changing projects in Australia and community development projects in Timor-Leste, Peru, Papua New Guinea and Fiji
- Mary MacKillop Place (not incorporated) - the burial site of Saint Mary of the Cross MacKillop, offering accommodation and conference facilities, a museum, and the Mary MacKillop Memorial Chapel in the heart of North Sydney
- Mary MacKillop College - Year 7 to 12 girls' school based in Kensington, South Australia
- St Anthony's Family Care - providing services to nurture and support children and young adults of all abilities

The work of the Sisters continues among the thousands of lay people who lead and serve in the ministries and direct the focus through being directors of the boards of the incorporated community works.

The Sisters maintain an interest in working in education, aged care, ministry in rural areas, work with First Nations people, refugees, families, the homeless, and general pastoral and parish ministries. The South Australian Province Reconciliation Circle, comprising a group of Josephite and Carmelite women together with Aboriginal mentors, began meeting regularly in 2003 to work for justice and reconciliation in Indigenous affairs. In 2006 the Conference of Josephite Leaders (Central and Federation Congregations) established the Josephite Justice Office to conduct advocacy in the community.

Between 2012 and 2014 the Sisters of Saint Joseph of Tasmania, Goulburn, Whanganui (Sisters of St Joseph of Nazareth), and the Perthville Congregation merged with the Sisters of Saint Joseph of the Sacred Heart.

== Contemporary Ministries - Mary MacKillop Today ==
In 2018, three Josephite-affiliated bodies - Mary MacKillop International, the Mary MacKillop Foundation, and the Josephite Foundation - merged to form Mary MacKillop Today, a single organisation continuing the congregation's education, health, financial inclusion and livelihoods work in Australia, Timor-Leste, Fiji and Peru. One of its programs, a No Interest Loan Scheme originally established in Bathurst in 1998, has continued to expand across regional New South Wales in response to rising demand. Mary MacKillop Today is accredited by the Australian Department of Foreign Affairs and Trade and is a member of the Australian Council for International Development.

== Canonisation of Mary MacKillop ==
In 1925, the congregational leader of the Sisters of Saint Joseph, Mother Laurence, began the process to have MacKillop declared a saint and Archbishop Michael Kelly of Sydney established a tribunal to carry the process forward. After further investigations, MacKillop's "heroic virtue" was declared in 1992. Her canonisation was announced on 19 February 2010 and took place on 17 October 2010. An estimated 8,000 Australians were present in Vatican City to witness the ceremony.

== Notable members ==
=== Irene McCormack ===
Irene McCormack (21 August 1938 – 21 May 1991) was an Australian member of the Sisters of St Joseph of the Sacred Heart who worked as a missionary in Peru. She was executed there in 1991 by members of Sendero Luminoso ("Shining Path"), a Maoist rebel guerrilla organisation.

In October 2010, Australian media reported McCormack's possible recognised sainthood after Mary MacKillop's canonisation. The Daily Telegraph reported that senior Peruvian and Australian Catholic clergy planned on preparing a submission to the Vatican for McCormack's cause after Mary MacKillop's canonisation.

The then Congregational Leader of the Sisters of St Joseph, Sister Ann Derwin, said that people in Huasahuasi, who already regarded McCormack as a saint, demanded this, since people judged to have been martyrs do not require evidence of miracles performed through their intercession.

== Schools - AJASS ==
In the spirit of Mary MacKillop's focus on education, schools in the Josephite tradition seek to live her vision of a just and compassionate world. These schools empower people to respond in the 21st century to the call that remains at the heart of the Josephite spirit.

AJASS is an independent Association of Josephite Affiliated Secondary Schools and aims to embrace, extend, strengthen and perpetuate the charism of Mary MacKillop and Julian Tenison Woods.
