= Julian Tenison-Woods =

English Catholic priest and geologist (1832–1889)

The Reverend Julian Tenison-Woods
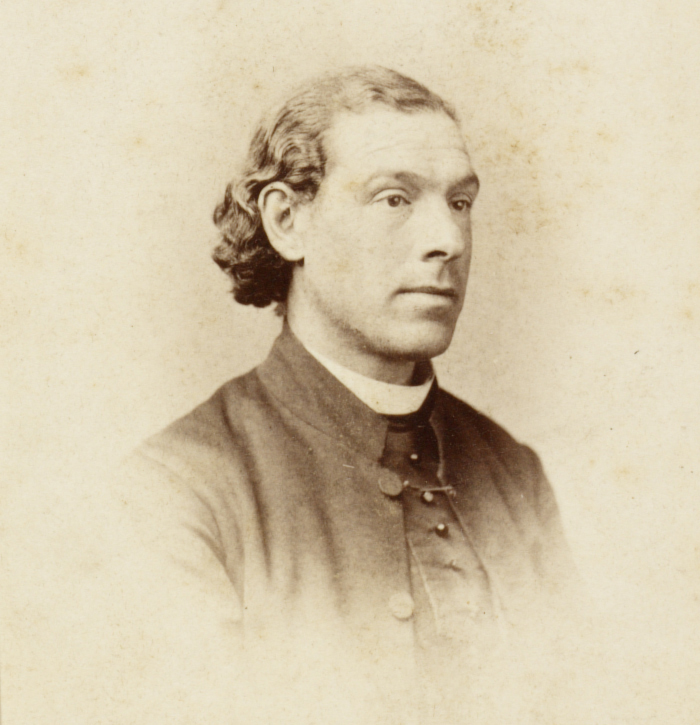
- Albumen print
- Born: 15 November 1832; London, England
- Died: 7 October 1889; Sydney, New South Wales, Australia
- Citizenship: United Kingdom
- Education: Marist seminaries near Toulon, France
- Known for: Geology
- Awards: Clarke Medal (1888)
- Scientific career
- Workplaces: Royal Society of New South Wales

Julian Edmund Tenison-Woods (Note: Though common in modern references, his surname was not hyphenated in contemporary newspaper reports, his signature, or his headstone.) (15 November 1832 – 7 October 1889), commonly referred to as Father Woods, was an English Catholic priest and geologist who served in Australia. With Mary MacKillop, he co-founded the Sisters of St Joseph of the Sacred Heart at Penola in 1866.

== Early life ==
Tenison-Woods was born in London, the sixth son (of eleven children) of James Dominick Woods, a sub-editor of The Times, and his wife, Henrietta Maria Saint-Eloy Tenison, daughter of the Rev. Joseph Tenison, rector of Donoughmore, County Wicklow, Ireland, and of the same family as Archbishop Thomas Tenison. She became a Catholic.

Julian Tenison-Woods was baptised by the Rev. John White of the Royal Belgian Chapel, Southwark, (Note: The site of the Royal Belgian Chapel became Saint George's Cathedral, cf. https://books.google.com/books?id=65JUAAAAYAAJ&pg=PA64) and confirmed by Cardinal Wiseman, at that time Vicar-Apostolic of the London District. He attended Thomas Hunt's Catholic school, Kent House, Hammersmith, and, briefly, Newington Grammar School.

== Family ==
Three brothers of Woods emigrated to Australia:

- Edward Tenison Woods (c. 1825 – 4 June 1866) was a reporter for the Melbourne Argus.
- James Dominick Woods (1826 – 7 July 1905), South Australian journalist and author of The Province of South Australia. He emigrated in 1853 as an agent of banker John Abel Smith (1802–1871). His contribution to South Australian letters was acknowledged by "A. Pencil" (Sir William Sowden). A grandson, (Julian) Gordon Tenison Woods (1909– ) married Mary Cecil Kitson (1893–1971) on 13 December 1924. She was South Australia's first woman barrister. He was struck off the rolls in 1927 for misuse of trust funds; they divorced in 1933.
- Terence Albert Tenison-Woods (c. 1835 – 1 July 1887) was postmaster at Penola, died in Sydney.

== Early career ==
In 1849 he assisted Canon Oakley, a convert who had charge of the Catholic chapel at Islington, with a school he had established. In 1850 he entered the monastery of the Passionist order at Broadway in Worcestershire and became a novice. His health began to fail, and he studied at Marist seminaries near Toulon, France, where he also taught English at a naval college. Around this time, his interest in geology and natural history appears to have begun.

In 1854, in England, Tenison-Woods met Robert Willson, the first Roman Catholic Bishop of Hobart. The two travelled to Van Diemen's Land (now Tasmania), arriving in Hobart on the Bernicia on 30 January 1855. Woods fell into disagreement with Willson and left for Adelaide around March/April 1855. He worked for the Adelaide Times as sub-editor for a year, then, in April 1856, entered the "Sevenhill" Jesuit college near Clare, South Australia to prepare for ordination. His brother J. D. Woods helped by completing his contract with the newspaper.

== Priesthood ==
Tenison-Woods was ordained as a diocesan priest on 4 January 1857 and took charge of the large parish of Penola. He published his first book, Geological Observations in South Australia, in 1862. With Sister Mary MacKillop (who was later canonised), Tenison-Woods co-founded the congregation of Sisters of St Joseph of the Sacred Heart at Penola in 1866.

After four years as director of Catholic education, he continued working as a scientist and missionary priest in New South Wales, Tasmania and Queensland.

Tenison-Woods met Adam Lindsay Gordon. Early in 1867, Tenison-Woods was transferred to Adelaide and was appointed director-general of Catholic education and secretary to Bishop Laurence Sheil, with the clerical style of The Very Reverend. Another of his duties was the administration of the newly erected cathedral. Woods was also a musician and reportedly accompanied the church choir at Penola with a harmonium.

Tenison-Woods founded the Southern Cross in 1867. It ceased after two years, but he made a further foray into journalism in 1870 with The Chaplet and Advocate of the Children of Mary, which may have run to no more than two issues. He was then involved, initially with Archdeacon Russell and Father Byrne, in production of the monthly Southern Cross and Catholic Herald, which was dropped after the weekly Irish Harp and Farmers' Herald had become firmly established and the two amalgamated around November 1873 as The Harp and Southern Cross.

He has been described as a "rigid teetotaller" and a "stern advocate" of temperance for many years.

== Geological work ==
Tenison-Woods' district contained many formations of geological interest. Tenison-Woods published his first book, Geological Observations in South Australia, in 1862. His History of the Discovery and Exploration of Australia (London, 1865) in two volumes, and his serialized "Australian bibliography" in the Australian Monthly Magazine (1866–67), show Tenison-Woods' broad knowledge.

In 1878, Tenison-Woods joined the Linnean Society of New South Wales. His Fish and Fisheries of New South Wales (Sydney, 1883) was published by the colonial government, and William III of the Netherlands awarded Tenison-Woods a gold medal for the book.

== Botanical work ==
In the 1860s, Tenison-Woods started to publish his research into geology and botany. His first botanical work was an acknowledgement of the specimens in the [Ninety Mile Desert] that he collected for the [National Herbarium of Victoria]. They were subsequently referenced in Flora Australiensis. Tenison-Woods also wrote botanical papers himself, including in the Proceedings of the Linnean Society of New South Wales:

- Bailey, F. M. & Tenison-Woods, J. E. 1879. A census of the flora of Brisbane. (1)4: 137-204.
- Tenison-Woods, J. E. 1879. On Arauja albens. (1)4: 111-112.
- Tenison-Woods, J. E. 1879. On the relations of the Brisbane flora. (1)4: 117-137.
- Tenison-Woods, J. E. 1882. Botanical notes on Queensland. No. I. (1)7: 76-83.
- Tenison-Woods, J. E. 1882. On various deposits of fossil plants in Queensland. (1)7: 95-98.
- Tenison-Woods, J. E. 1882. Botanical notes on Queensland. No. II. The tropics. (1)7: 136-147.
- Tenison-Woods, J. E. 1882. Botanical notes in Queensland. No. III. (1)7: 305-310.
- Tenison-Woods, J. E. 1882. Botanical notes on Queensland. No. IV. (1)7: 331-342.
- Tenison-Woods, J. E. 1882. On a coal plant from Queensland. (1)7: 342-344.
- Tenison-Woods, J. E. 1883. Botanical notes on Queensland. No. V. (1)7: 565-585.
- Tenison-Woods, J. E. 1883. On the fossil flora of the coal deposits of Australia. (1)8: 37-167.
- Tenison-Woods, J. E. 1888a. On the volcano of Taal. (2)2: 685-810.
- Tenison-Woods, J. E. 1889. On the vegetation of Malaysia. (2)4: 9-106.

Papers published by the Royal Society of New South Wales that focused on botany included:

- Tenison-Woods, J. E. 1878. Tasmanian forests: Their botany and economic value. (12): 17−28, 1878.
- Tenison-Woods, J. E. 1882. A fossil plant formation in central Queensland (16): 179−192, 1882.

Of the plants collected by Tenison-Woods, these specimens are now cared for by multiple herbaria throughout Australasia, including over 1,000 specimens held by the National Herbarium of Victoria, Royal Botanic Gardens Victoria, the Queensland Herbarium, the National Herbarium of New South Wales, the Northern Territory Herbarium, and the Auckland War Memorial Museum Herbarium. He was awarded the 1888 Clarke Medal for distinguished contribution to natural science and a grant of £25 by the Royal Society of New South Wales.

== Evolution ==
Tenison-Woods was an advocate of theistic evolution. In 1880, he commented,

"I can well believe that there is much truth in evolution. If tomorrow the evidence of its occurrence were established on indubitable grounds, it would be one more beautiful illustration of the plan of nature."

== Exploration and acquisitions ==
For three years, between August 1883 and June 1886, Woods travelled through Eastern and Southeastern Asia, including Hong Kong, China and two trips to Japan. In late 1885 Woods had intended to travel along the Yangtze, but because of a cholera outbreak at Shanghai he re-routed to Kobe, before moving inland to the hot spring town of Arima Onsen. He remained in Arima Onsen until February–March 1886 when he departed for Hong Kong, and ultimately returning to Darwin, Australia, for further expeditions. During this period in Japan, he collected mineral samples, plants, and a large number of examples of Japanese artworks, spiritual items, photographs, and material culture. After Tenison Woods' death in 1889 his executrix disposed of his estate, and a portion was purchased by the Sydney-based Museum of Applied Arts & Sciences (MAAS). Today, over 150 of the items collected by Woods are held at this museum, with the majority of these items acquired while in Japan.

== Weakening health and death ==
He dictated his partly fanciful autobiographical memoir to his carers.

He died at St Vincent's Hospital on 7 October 1889, aged 56, and was buried in the Catholic section at Waverley Cemetery, Sydney.

== Commemoration ==
The Father Woods Park in Glenroy, outside of Mount Gambier, was developed on land donated to the Archdiocese of Adelaide that was consecrated by Archbishop Matthew Beovich in 1951. The park features chainsaw-carved wooden sculptures by Kevin Gilders depicting events in Tenison-Woods' life that were completed in 2010 for the park's re-dedication. In 1974 the highest peak in the D'Aguilar Range (770 m) within Brisbane Forest Park, south-east Queensland, was named Tenison-Woods Mountain. The Tenison Woods Reserve in Goulburn, New South Wales, was established in 1889 to commemorate the centenary of Tenison-Woods' death. It features a rose garden and a small shelter with a park table.

== Significant publications ==
- Tenison-Woods, J.E. 1865. A History of the Discovery and Exploration of Australia. Or, an Account of the Progress of Geographical Discovery in that Continent from the earliest period to the present day. By the Rev. J. E. T. Woods, F. R. G. S. &c., &c., &c. (1865)
- Tenison-Woods, J.E. 1882. The Hawkesbury Sandstone. Journal and Proceedings of the Royal Society of New South Wales 16:53–116.
- Tenison-Woods, J.E. 1882. Physical structure and geology of Australia. The Proceedings of the Linnean Society of New South Wales 7(3):371–389.

== See also ==
- Media related to Julian Tenison-Woods at Wikimedia Commons
- Digitized works by J. E. Tenison-Woods at Biodiversity Heritage Library
- List of Catholic clergy scientists

Awards
Preceded by James Hector	Clarke Medal; 1888	Succeeded by Robert L. J. Ellery
