= Jeremiah O'Flynn =

Catholic priest in colonial Australia (1788–1831)

Jeremiah Francis O'Flynn (1788-1831), was a Roman Catholic priest and prelate, the first Prefect Apostolic of New Holland in colonial Australia, before he was deported from the colony by the British.

== Early life and education ==
O'Flynn was born on 25 December 1788 in Tralee, County Kerry, Ireland. He studied with the Franciscans at Killarney.

== Early career ==
In 1810, entered Lulworth Abbey, Dorset, England as a Trappists monk. This house was an emigre community which had taken refuge there after its expulsion from France in 1790. In 1812, he was professed and took the religious name Francis.

In 1813, O'Flynn was ordained by Bishop William Poynter and went with other Trappist monks to establish a mission in Canada. The mission was instead forced to land in Martinique, where the English authorities detained the monks. The French monks were later expelled but as a British subject, O’Flynn was permitted to remain. He went to the Caribbean island of Saint Croix which had recently come under British administration. Here he functioned as priest in Christiansted. Although the island was administered by the English it was under the jurisdiction of the Archdiocese of Baltimore which at the time was led by John Carroll. Fr O’Flynn had a disagreement with Carroll’s successor Bishop Neale and departed for Rome in 1816.

The purpose of this visit was to resolve his dispute with Neale, however, he came under the influence of Father Hayes, the representative of the Irish Catholic Association in Rome, whose brother, Michael Hayes, had been transported to New South Wales. O’Flynn was released from his monastic vows by Pope Pius VII. O'Flynn was appointed Prefect Apostolic of New Holland by the Congregation of Propaganda Fide

O'Flynn returned to Ireland and from there went to London. In London, he sought British permission to go to New South Wales but ignored protocol by going through Bishop Poynter. In February 1817, Poynter met Bathurst, the Colonial Secretary and gave an unfavourable account of O'Flynn. Bathurst refused permission to O'Flynn amongst other things on the grounds that the Irishman had insufficient grasp of English to work in an English colony. The last of the penal laws against Catholics were still in place at this time.

Despite not receiving permission, O'Flynn decided to go to Australia, leaving at the end of March 1817. He arrived in Sydney that November without the requisite papers from the Colonial Office. After Governor Macquarie refused him permission to stay, O'Flynn persuaded the governor to allow him to remain until he heard from London. In this period, O'Flynn functioned continuously as a priest attending to the spiritual needs of the Catholics in the colony who were without any clergy. This included the Irish Catholic men of the 48th Regiment of Foot. The Governor was alarmed at this development and in mid 1818, had O'Flynn deported.

Back in England, O'Flynn petitioned Bathurst but flatly refused him permission to return. The issue was even raised parliament to no avail.

A Catholic clergyman had voluntarily gone from Ireland with the view of instructing convicts of his own persuasion. He had gone from house to house, and exerted himself in the most laudable manner in promoting the comfort and correcting the morals of the people. No objections whatever were made to him on any other ground but that of his being a Catholic; but as a Catholic he was sent away from the settlement. ... Yet the governor had shut up this priest in a gaol, and sent him home a prisoner. All he could say was, that he had this under Mr. Marsden's own hand—he had his letter in his pocket. Nothing could be more affecting than the manner in which mass was first celebrated in the settlement. Hundreds and thousands were present The poor Irish lamented exceedingly the departure of their clergyman. They shed tears as he left them, and appeared rather to be following some beloved friend to his grave, than their pastor to the vessel which was to bear him away. He hoped government would take care that in future proper religious instruction should be given to the Catholics.

== Later career ==
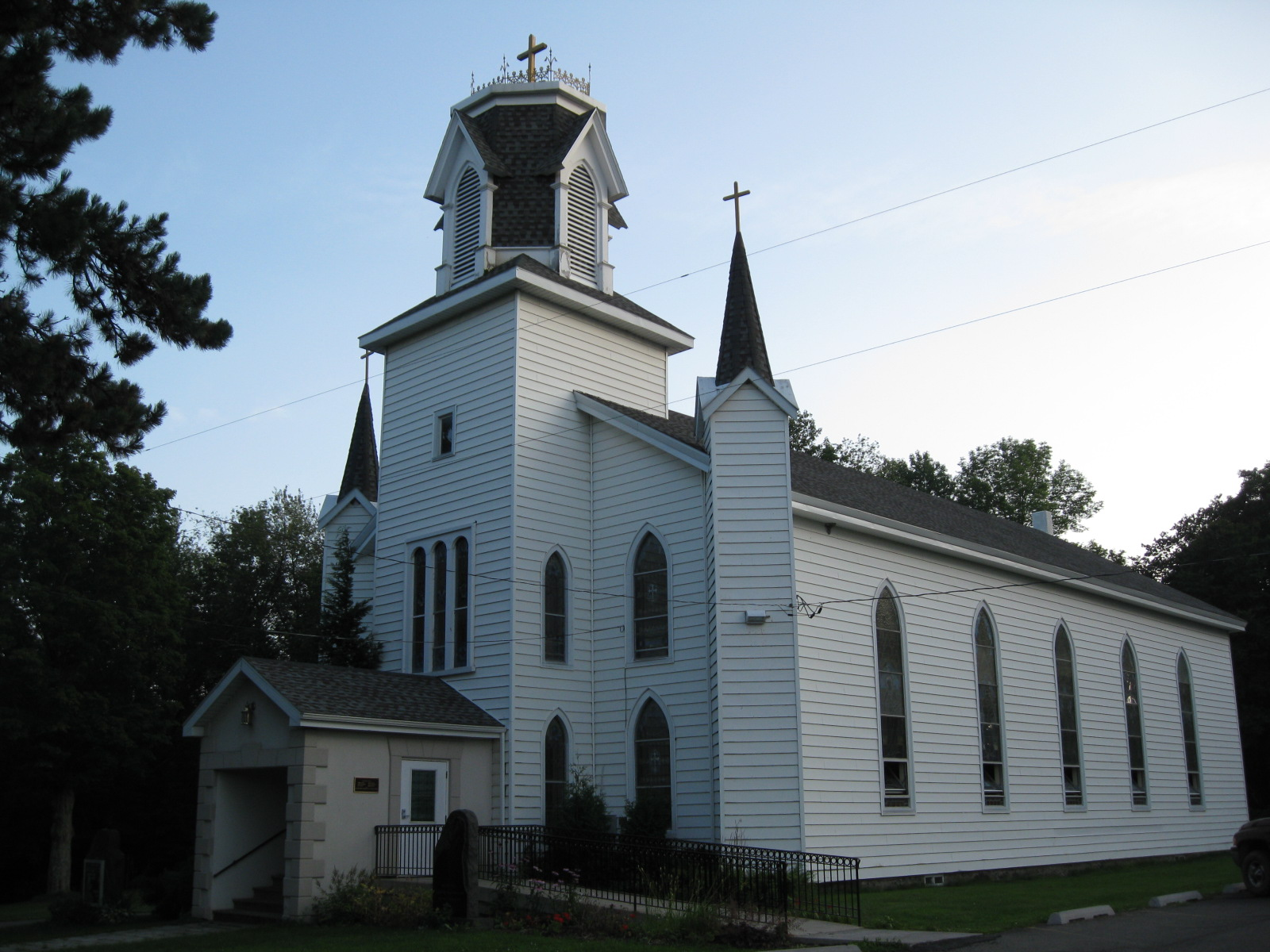
St. Augustine's Catholic Church - Silver Lake Township, Pennsylvania

After it was clear he would not return to New South Wales, O'Flynn went to the West Indies in 1819, first to Port-au-Prince, Haiti where he became a parish priest. In 1820, after another old adversary, bishop Pierre de Glory, was appointed Vicar of Haiti, O'Flynn left.

For the next decade, O'Flynn moved between Philadelphia, Dominica, and New Haven before returning to Philadelphia. The Hogan Schism may have impacted his ability to function as a priest there as he was refused permission to work there. By 1828, he was living with family in Susquehanna in upstate Pennsylvania. He established St Augustine's Church in Silver Lake.

== Death ==
O'Flynn died in 1831.
