= Parliamentary Christian Fellowship =

The Parliamentary Christian Fellowship, also known as the Parliamentary prayer group, involves a number of gatherings of Christian politicians in the Australian parliament, from small informal prayer gatherings to the annual National Prayer Breakfast.

== Overview ==
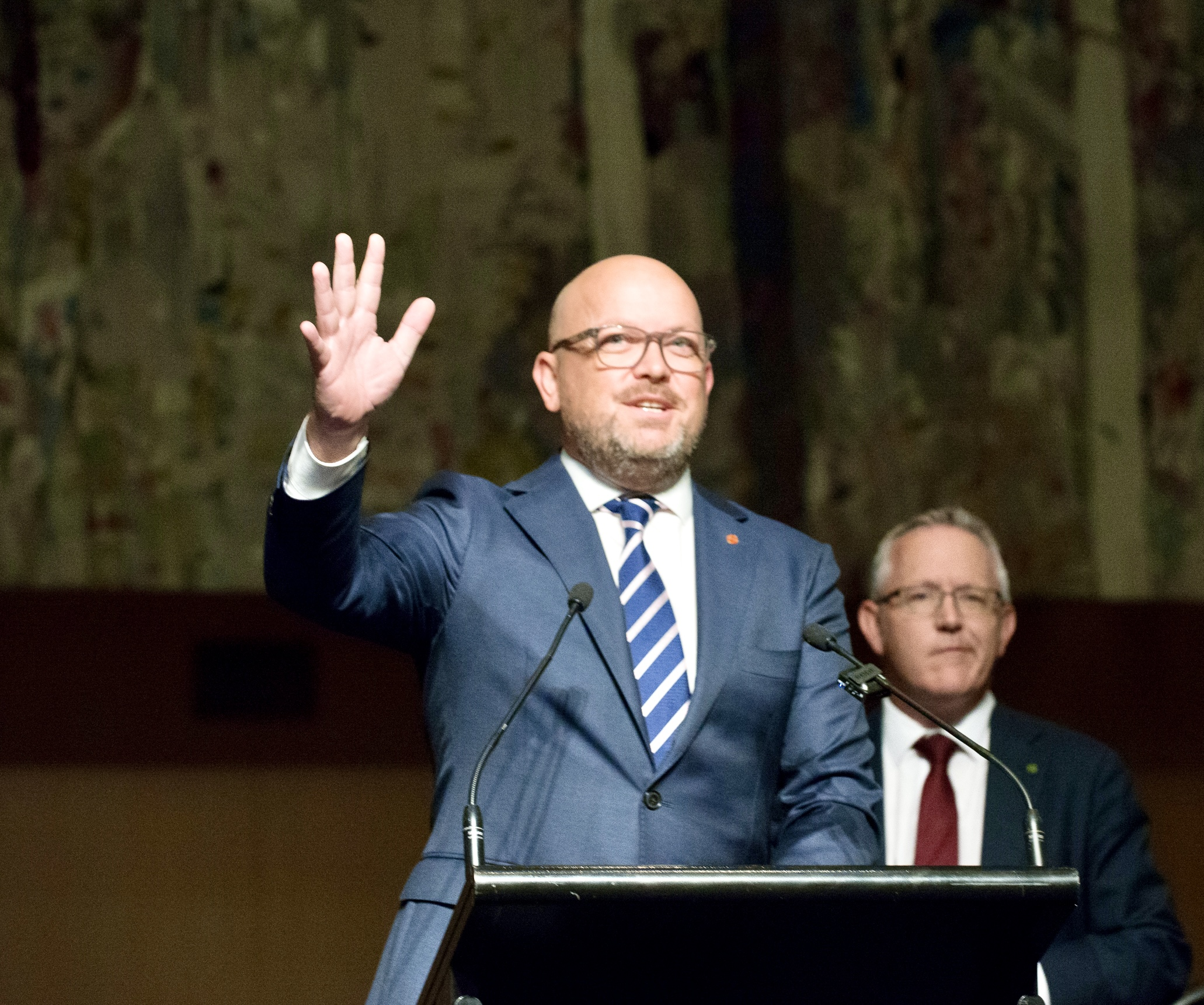
Senator Matt O'Sullivan and David Smith MP have been the co-chairs of the Fellowship, since 2022.

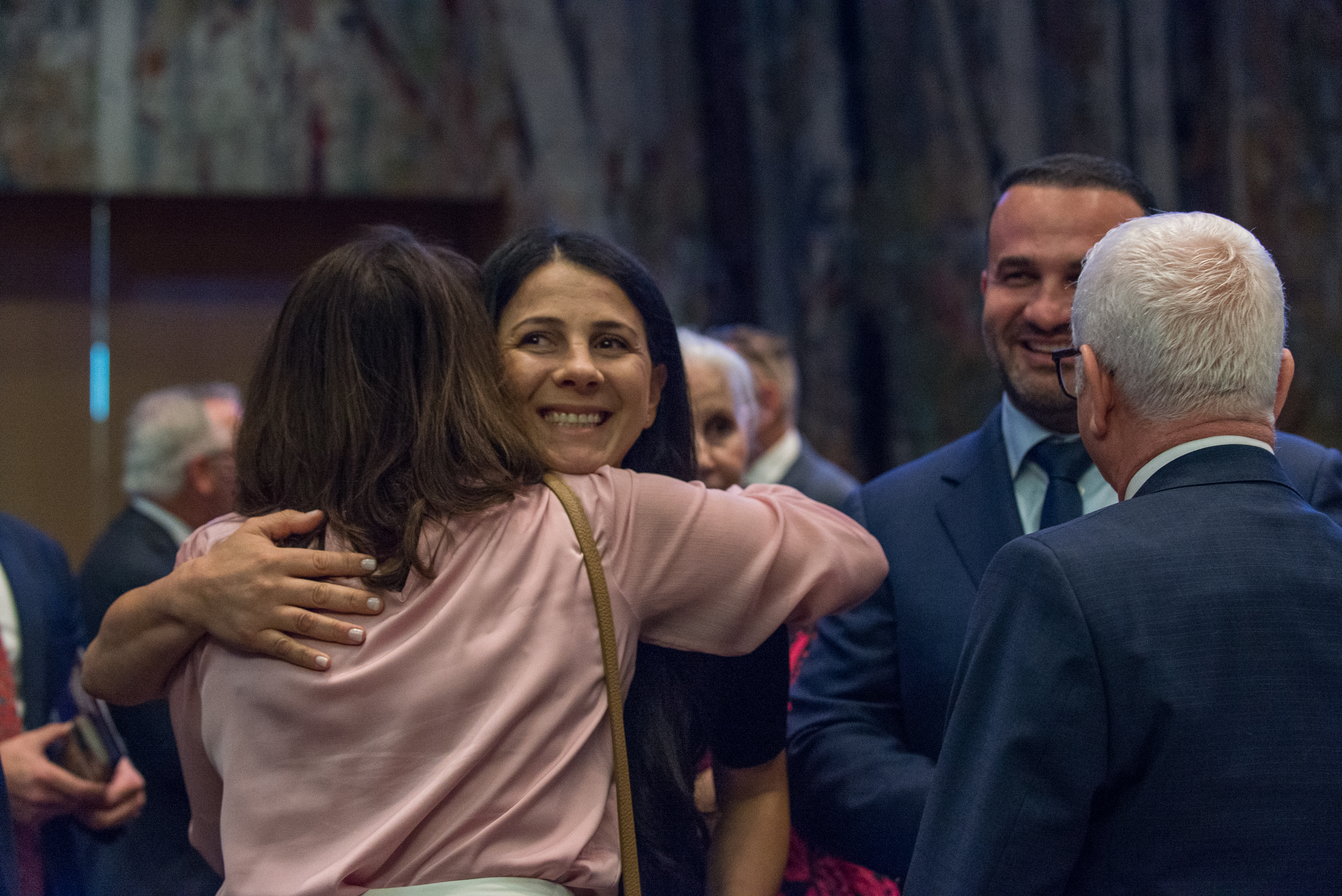
Speakers and guests at the prayer event in the Australian Parliament, 2023.

The Parliamentary Christian Fellowship is a cross-party grouping for MPs and Senators. Its activities include meetings for prayer and Bible study followed by a discussion. The group, at first known as the Federal Parliamentary Christian Fellowship, was initiated by the Labor Party front-bencher, Frank Crean in 1968. The first organisers were reported to be Evan Adermann of the National Party and Mervyn Lee of the Liberal Party. Its first secretary was the longtime Labor Whip, Gil Duthie, who only stood down from the role in 1975.

Devoted to fellowship, rather than politics, it has rarely made public statements. However, in 1972, its members, drawing on three parties did release a statement against The Little Red Book saying it "has the potential to sow the seeds of anarchy among young people."

In the 1980s, the group was said to number about 30, meeting four times in each of the autumn and budget sittings. By 2007, it was said to mainly be attended by socially conservative Members of Parliament. Kevin Rudd was considered the mainstay of the group and, at that point, was the only member of the Labor Party to regularly attend. Rudd had formed a good relationship with conservative independent Bob Katter as a result of their mutual attendance at the group. In 2010–2020, it was said to have about 60 to 75 members, perhaps a quarter of all Parliamentarians.

The group has no statement of belief and, as disclosed by one member, Bruce Baird, "they're not confessional. Rather, the meetings, "are quite personal encounters that go to the implication of what it means to be a Christian with a heavy public burden." The group has met with fellowships of other nations at points. A retreat held in Sydney in June 1985 included the Prime Ministers of Solomon Islands and Fiji where "solidarity with Christians in leading positions in the Pacific and Asian regions allows us to break out of some pretty partisan conflicts."

Parliamentarians who have participated through its history include:

- Evan Adermann (National)
- Bob Baldwin (Liberal)
- Bronwyn Bishop (Liberal)
- Bob Katter (Independent)
- John Langmore (Labor)
- Sussan Ley (Liberal)
- Scott Morrison (Liberal)
- Christopher Pyne (Liberal)
- Kevin Rudd (Labor)
- Amanda Stoker (Liberal)
- Michael Tate (Labor)

=== Church Service for the new Parliamentary year ===
The Parliamentary Christian Fellowship sponsors the ecumenical church service at the start of each Parliamentary year; as this was a goal of the fellowship since its beginnings. The church service is rotated annually across different denominations.

The inaugural Parliamentary service was held at St Andrew's Presbyterian, close to the Parliament on 25 February 1969. Ten clergymen took part in that service, with the organiser, Mervyn Lee, saying "it is right and proper for members of both sides of the Parliament to be drawn together to worship in this way." In 1992 It was held at St Christopher's Catholic Cathedral. In 2023 it was held at the Greek Orthodox Church of St Nicholas in Canberra.

=== Australian National Prayer Breakfast ===
The Fellowship hosts an annual National Prayer Breakfast. The ecumenical event is often addressed by the Governor-General of Australia, the Prime Minister and Leader of the Opposition.

The first of events was held in 1986 and was said to have extended from breakfast, through to morning discussion groups, then lunch. It was attended by 350 people, including the Prime Minister of the Solomon Islands Sir Peter Kenilorea, the keynote address was given by Kim Beazley Sr, dominated by themes of peace from his time working with Moral Re-Armament. It was the largest assembly ever to back the Members' Dining Room.

The event often features music, with the choir of local schools performing, such as Canberra Grammar singing in 2000. The centre-piece of the event is the public recital of Lord's Prayer. In 2019, the co-chairs were Luke Gosling and Amanda Stoker, with one reporter noting uplifting themes, warmth, and "real fellowship."

As of 2023, David Smith and Matt O'Sullivan were co-chairs of the Fellowship. The 2023 breakfast the keynote speakers Danny and Leila Abdallah of I4Give Foundation, sharing their story of forgiveness after the loss of three of their children.

== See also ==
- Catholic Church and politics
- Christianity in Australia
- Religion in Australia
- Secularism
