= Apostolic Prefecture of New Holland =

Catholic mission in Australia (1816–19)

The Apostolic Prefecture of New Holland was a short-lived (1816–1819) Roman Catholic missionary jurisdiction in colonial Australia.

== History ==
In 1681, Fr Vittorio Riccio OP of Manila was appointed Prefect Apostolic of Terra Australis. He died in 1685.

Fr James Dixon, the first Catholic priest permitted to minister in Australia, was briefly appointed Prefect Apostolic of New Holland in 1803. It was the first official Catholic appointment in Australia.

The Prefecture was established in 1816 as an Apostolic Prefecture (missionary pre-diocesan jurisdiction; exempt, i.e. directly subject to the Holy See, not part of any ecclesiastical province) in Australia, a territory split off from the then Apostolic Vicariate of the London District (in still missionary England; of a higher pre-diocesan rank, entitled to a titular bishop).

Fr Jeremiah O'Flynn was appointed and arrived in Sydney but was soon expelled by Governor Macquarie as he lacked government authorisation.

On 4 April 1819, it was suppressed and its territory merged into the then Apostolic Vicariate of Cape of Good Hope and adjacent territories (in South Africa, across the Indian Ocean; now Archdiocese of Cape Town).

In 1834, it would be de facto restored (still from the Cape Vicariate) as Apostolic Vicariate of New Holland and Van Diemen's Land, the precursor of the present Metropolitan Roman Catholic Archdiocese of Sydney.

== See also ==
- Catholic Church in Australia
