= James Dixon (priest) =

Irish-Australian Catholic priest (1758–1840)

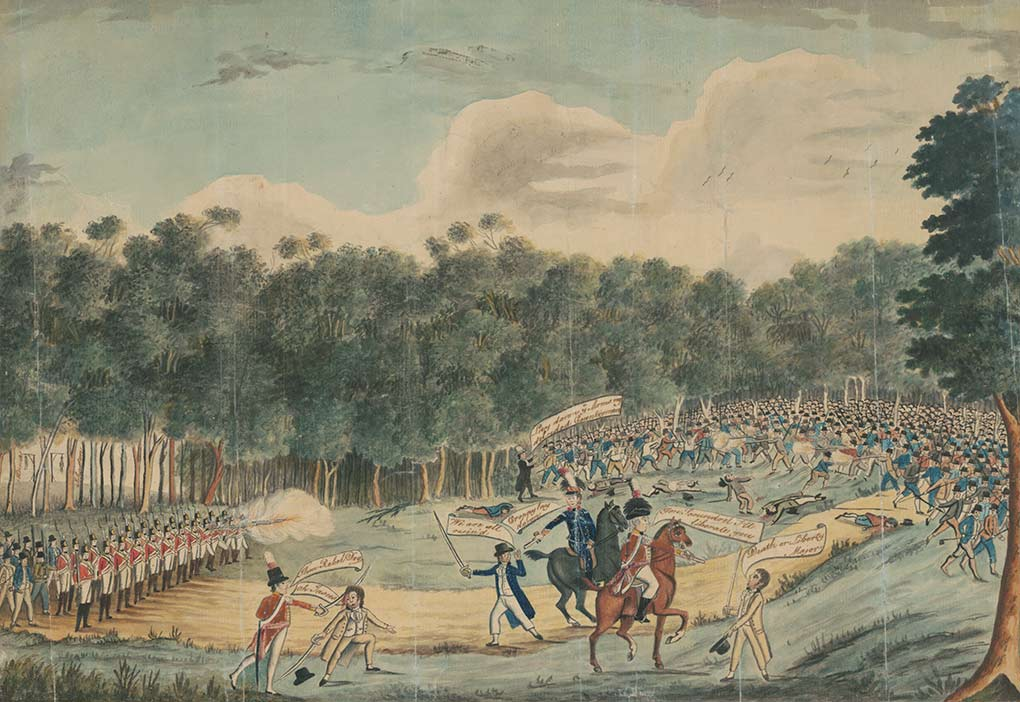
Dixon (centre, in black) addresses the Castle Hill rebels

James Dixon (1758 – 1840) was an Irish Catholic priest who was transported to Australia and in 1803 became the first Catholic priest permitted to minister there.

== Early life ==
James Dixon was born in 1758 in Castlebridge, County Wexford. As was common for Irish priests, he trained for the priesthood overseas, at the universities of Salamanca and Louvain, then became curate at Crossabeg near Wexford. During the Irish Rebellion of 1798 he was arrested and tried for involvement and convicted, although there was considerable evidence that he was innocent. He was sentenced to death but the sentence was commuted to transportation for life to New South Wales. He arrived in Sydney on the Friendship on 16 January 1800. Two other Irish convict priests, Peter O'Neil and James Harold, arrived in the same year.

== Ministry in Australia ==
Dixon impressed the authorities as a man of mild temperament and good education. Lord Hobart, the Secretary of State for War and the Colonies, instructed Governor King to permit toleration of the Catholic faith in the hope of reducing discontent among the Irish convicts, many of whom had been sent for actions during the 1798 rebellion. On 24 April 1803 King announced that Dixon would be permitted to regularly say mass. King expressed satisfaction with the result and began to pay Dixon a salary.

However on 4 March 1804 the Irish convicts began the Castle Hill convict rebellion. The commander of troops in the colony, Major Johnston, acted quickly and marched to confront the rebels. He took Dixon with him. A contemporary watercolour shows Dixon pleading with the rebels "Lay down your arms my deluded countrymen." His pleas were unsuccessful but Johnston tricked the rebel leaders and the rebellion collapsed. Despite Dixon's efforts at creating peace, King withdrew his permission to minister.

Church authorities in Rome heard of the Irish priests and responded enthusiastically, sending Dixon an appointment as Prefect Apostolic of New Holland. It was the first official Catholic Church appointment in Australia.

Dixon continued to minister privately and was recorded as performing a wedding in 1809.

== Later life ==
Dixon was allowed to leave the colony in 1809. He returned to Crossabeg and became parish priest. In later life he said little about his time in Australia. He died in 1840.

== Books ==
- 2003, Vivienne Keely, Dixon of Botany Bay: The convict priest from Wexford, Strathfield, St Paul's, ISBN 1876295635
- 1984, Harold Perkins, The Convict Priests, Rosanna, Vic, H. Perkins ISBN 0959140700
