= Lulworth Abbey =

Trappist monastery in Dorset, England

Coordinates: 50°37′45″N 2°11′51″W

Lulworth Abbey was a Trappist monastery at East Lulworth in Dorset, England, established as a priory in 1796 by Thomas Weld for refugee French Trappist monks moving on from temporary shelter in the abandoned La Valsainte Charterhouse in Switzerland. The monastery at Lulworth was raised to the status of an abbey in 1813 by Pope Pius VII. In 1817 it was abandoned, as the monks were able to return to France, to the newly-re-established Melleray Abbey near Nantes.
