= Ursula Stephens =

Australian politician

The Honourable Ursula Stephens

Senator for New South Wales
- In office 1 July 2002 – 30 June 2014

Personal details
- Born: Ursula Mary Clarke; 7 July 1954 (age 72) Wicklow, Ireland
- Party: Labor
- Spouse: Bob Stephens
- Education: South Australian CAE; University of Canberra
- Profession: Teacher

Ursula Mary Stephens (née Clarke; born 7 July 1954) is an Australian former politician. She served as a Senator for New South Wales from 2002 to 2014, representing the Australian Labor Party (ALP). She was a parliamentary secretary in the Rudd and Gillard governments from 2007 to 2010. In 2019, she was appointed CEO of Catholic Social Services Australia.

== Early life ==
Stephens was born in Wicklow, Ireland. She arrived in Australia with her family at a young age and grew up on the New South Wales North Coast. She is one of seven siblings; her father was a mechanic and her mother was a nurse. She was educated at St Mary's College in Grafton.

She subsequently completed a diploma in teaching at Goulburn College of Advanced Education and a Bachelor of Education at the South Australian College of Advanced Education. She worked as a primary school teacher from 1974 to 1992, including in the Northern Territory for two years. She later operated a small business and then from 1997 to 2001 worked for the New South Wales state government as a senior project officer in the Premier's Department.

== Politics ==
Stephens joined the ALP as a result of the dismissal of the Whitlam government in 1975, during which she travelled to Canberra to attend protests. She was the first member of her family to join a political party. Stephens served on the Australian Labor Party National Executive and the national executive of the Labor Women's Network. She was president of the Australian Labor Party (New South Wales Branch) from 2002 to 2006, the first woman to hold the position.

=== Senate ===
Stephens was elected to the Senate at the 2001 federal election, to a term beginning on 1 July 2002. She was re-elected in 2007 but lost her seat in 2013, with her term ending on 30 June 2014. She was a member of the Labor Right faction.

In the Senate, Stephens served as chair of the economic references committee from 2003 to 2006. She was chosen as a shadow parliamentary secretary in 2004, continuing in the role under opposition leaders Mark Latham, Kim Beazley and Kevin Rudd until Labor's victory at the 2007 election. In 2005, she was one of only three ALP senators – along with Stephen Conroy and Helen Polley – to vote against greater availability of the abortion drug RU486. In the First Rudd Ministry, Stephens served as Parliamentary Secretary for Social Inclusion and Parliamentary Secretary for the Voluntary Sector. She initially continued on when the First Gillard Ministry was formed in June 2010, but in September 2010, following the 2010 election, her positions were abolished. She stated that they were abolished because "my job was completed" and it did not constitute a demotion.

Stephens was opposed to the legalisation of same-sex marriage in Australia. In 2011, she stated "marriage is about a relationship between a man and a woman [...] marriage is about producing children". In 2012 she submitted a report to the ALP caucus in which she stated same-sex marriage could have unintended consequences, such as allowing neighbours to marry for tax benefits. She said she was also concerned about "the demonisation of those who oppose same sex marriage" and that "anyone who knows me would never consider me as homophobic".

=== State politics ===
Stephens ran unsuccessfully for the seat of Goulburn at the 2015 New South Wales state election. She reprised her candidacy at the 2019 state election but was again unsuccessful.

== Later career ==
In July 2019, Stephens succeeded Frank Brennan as CEO of Catholic Social Services Australia. She resigned from the role in 2021 to take up an appointment as CEO of Australian Catholic Safeguarding Ltd, a newly created body established "to oversee safeguarding, child protection and professional standards matters" for the Catholic Church in Australia.

== Personal life ==
Stephens has four children with her husband Bob. In 2005, while serving in the Senate, she was awarded the degree of Doctor of Public Administration (DPA) by the University of Canberra for a thesis on "best practice in service delivery models and the impact of National Competition Policy reforms on regional and rural communities".
