= Catholic Church in Australia =

- Latin: Ecclesia Catholica in Australia
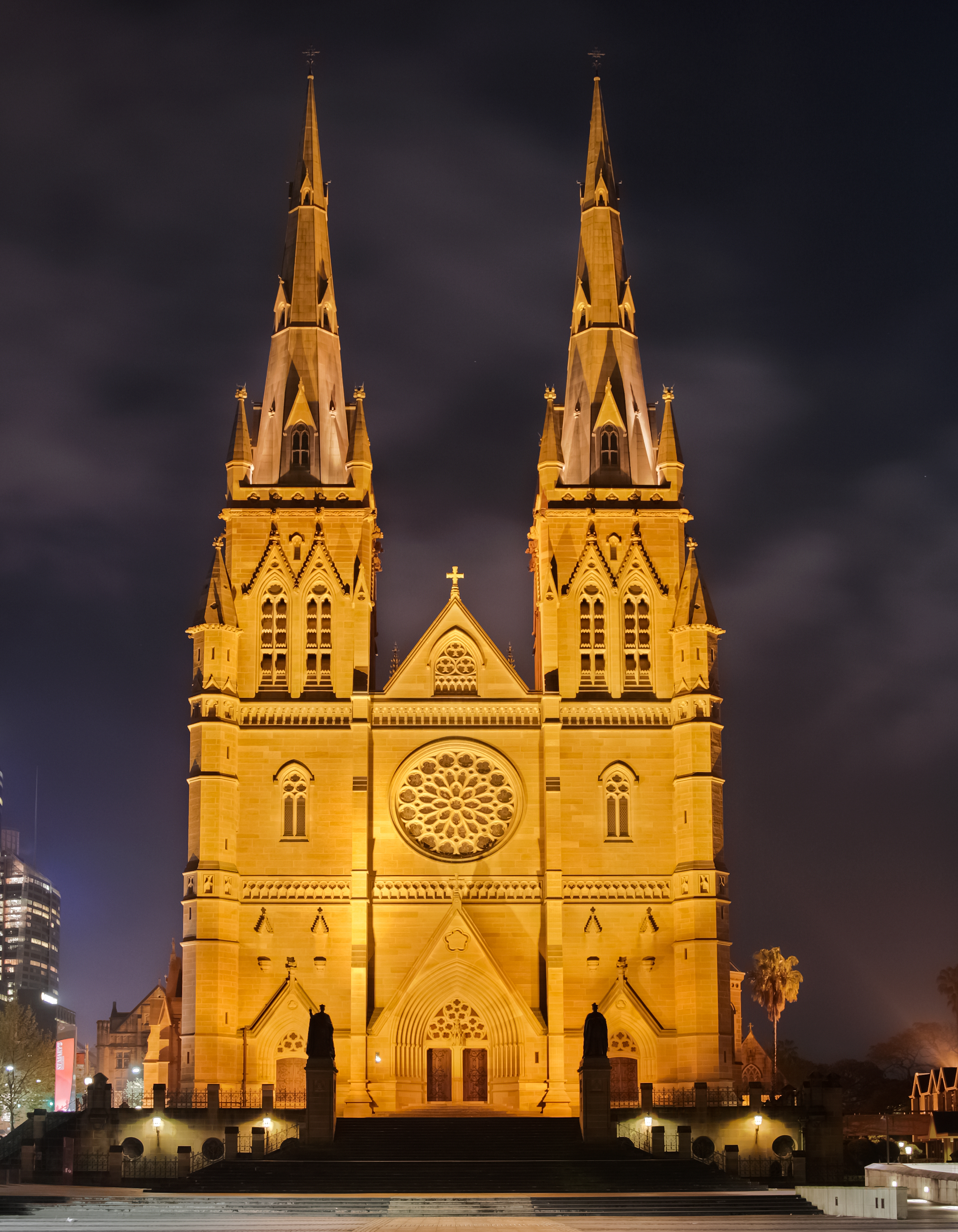
- St Mary's Cathedral, Sydney
- Type: National polity
- Classification: Catholic
- Orientation: Latin
- Scripture: Bible
- Theology: Catholic theology
- Polity: Episcopal
- Governance: Australian Catholic Bishops' Conference
- Pope: Leo XIV
- President of the ACBC: Timothy Costelloe SDB
- Region: Australia
- Language: English, Latin
- Origin: 1788; Sydney, New South Wales
- Number of followers: 5,886,980 (2021)
- Official website: catholic.org.au

People who identify as Catholic as a percentage of the total population in Australia divided geographically by statistical local area, as of the 2011 census

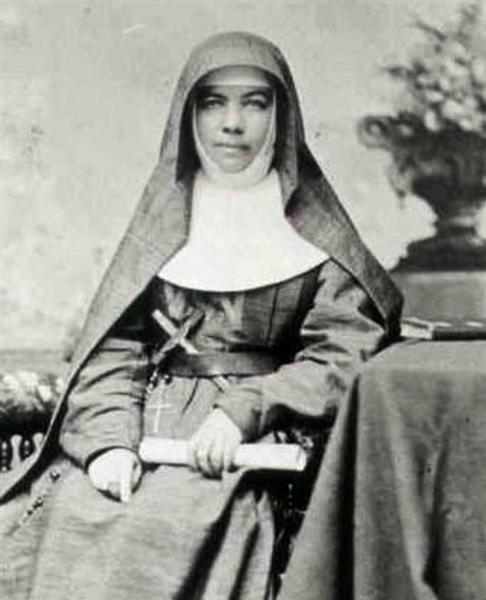
Mary MacKillop, co-founder of the Josephite Sisters became Australia's first canonised saint in October 2010.

The Catholic Church in Australia is part of the worldwide Catholic Church under the spiritual and administrative leadership of the Holy See. The Catholic Church is the largest Christian denomination in Australia, growing from its origins as a suppressed and largely Irish demographic during the colonial period to an ethnically and geographically diverse membership of around 5,075,907 people, representing about 20% of the overall population of Australia according to the 2021 ABS Census data.

The church is the largest non-government provider of welfare and education services in Australia. Catholic Social Services Australia aids some 450,000 people annually, while the St Vincent de Paul Society's 40,000 members form the largest volunteer welfare network in the country. In 2016, the church had some 760,000 students in more than 1,700 schools.

The Latin Church in Australia has five provinces: Adelaide, Brisbane, Melbourne, Perth and Sydney. It has 35 dioceses, comprising geographic areas as well as the military diocese, as well as dioceses administered by the Chaldean, Maronite, Melkite, Syro-Malabar, and Ukrainian Catholic Churches. The national assembly of bishops is the Australian Catholic Bishops Conference (ACBC). There are a further 175 Catholic religious orders operating in Australia, affiliated under Catholic Religious Australia. One Australian has been recognised as a saint by the Catholic Church: St Mary MacKillop, who was born in Melbourne and co-founded the Sisters of St Joseph of the Sacred Heart ("Josephite") religious institute in the 19th century.

== Demographics ==
Major religious affiliations in Australia by census year

Since the 1980s, Catholicism has been the largest Christian denomination in Australia, constituting around one-quarter of the overall population and becoming slightly larger than the Anglican and Uniting churches combined. Up until the 2016 census, adherents had been recorded as growing both numerically and as a percentage of the population; however, the 2016 census found a fall in both overall numbers and the percentage of Catholics as a proportion of Australian residents, with 5,291,839 Australian Catholics (around 22.6% of the population) in 2016, down from 5,439,257 in the 2011 census (25.3% of the population). This was repeated again in 2021, with the numbers dropping to 5,075,907 people, representing about 20% of the overall population of Australia according to the 2021 ABS Census data.[1]

Until the 1986 census, Australia's most populous Christian church was the Anglican Church of Australia. Since then, Catholics have outnumbered Anglicans by an increasing margin. The change is partly explained by changes in immigration patterns. Before the Second World War, the majority of immigrants to Australia came from the United Kingdom and most Catholic immigrants came from Ireland. After the war, Australia's immigration diversified, and more than 6.5 million migrants arrived in the following 60 years, including more than a million Catholics from Italy, Malta, Lebanon, the Netherlands, Germany, Poland, Croatia and Hungary.

At the 2016 Census, the ancestries with which Australian Catholics most identified were English (1.49 million), Australian (1.12 million), Irish (577,000), Italian (567,000) and Filipino (181,000).

Despite a growing population of Catholics, weekly Mass attendance has declined from an estimated 74% in the mid-1950s to around 14% in 2006.

There are seven archdioceses and 32 dioceses, with an estimated 3,000 priests and 9,000 men and women in institutes of consecrated life and societies of apostolic life, including six dioceses that cover the whole country: one each for those who belong to the Chaldean, Maronite, Melkite, Syro-Malabar and Ukrainian rites and one for those serving in the Australian Defence Forces. There is also a personal ordinariate for former Anglicans, which has a similar status to a diocese.

State/Territory	% 2016	% 2011	% 2006	% 2001
Australian Capital Territory	22.3	26.1	28.0	29.1
New South Wales	24.7	27.5	28.2	28.9
Northern Territory	19.9	21.6	21.1	22.2
Queensland	21.7	23.8	24.0	24.8
South Australia	18.0	19.9	20.2	20.8
Tasmania	15.6	17.9	18.4	19.3
Total	22.6	25.3	25.8	26.6
Victoria	23.2	26.7	27.5	28.4
Western Australia	21.4	23.6	23.7	24.7

== History ==
=== Arrival and suppression ===
Among the first Catholics known to have sighted Australia were the crew of a Spanish expedition of 1605–6. In 1606, the expedition's leader, Pedro Fernandez de Quiros, landed in the New Hebrides believing it to be the fabled southern continent. He named the land Austrialis del Espiritu Santo ("Southern Land of the Holy Spirit"). Later that year, his deputy Luís Vaz de Torres sailed through the Torres Strait between Australia and New Guinea.

The permanent presence of Catholicism in Australia came rather with the arrival of the First Fleet of British convict ships at Sydney in 1788. One-tenth of all the convicts who came to Australia on the First Fleet were Catholic, and at least half of them were born in Ireland. A small proportion of British marines on the First Fleet were also Catholic.

Just as the British were setting up the new colony, French captain Jean-François de Galaup, comte de Lapérouse arrived off Botany Bay with two ships. La Pérouse was 6 weeks in Botany Bay, where the French, besides other things, held Catholic Masses. The crew conducted the first Catholic burial, that of Father Louis Receveur, a Franciscan friar who died while the ships were at anchor at Botany Bay.

Some of the Irish convicts had been transported to Australia for political crimes or social rebellion in Ireland, so the authorities were suspicious of Catholicism for the first three decades of settlement.

Catholic convicts were compelled to attend Church of England services and their children and orphans were raised by the authorities as Anglicans. The first Catholic priests arrived in Australia as convicts in 1800 – James Harold, James Dixon and Peter O'Neill, who had been convicted for "complicity" in the Irish 1798 Rebellion. Fr Dixon was conditionally emancipated and permitted to celebrate Mass. On 15 May 1803, in vestments made from curtains and with a chalice made of tin, he conducted the first Catholic Mass in "New South Wales". The Castle Hill convict rebellion of 1804, which large numbers of Catholic convicts participated in, led Dixon's permission to celebrate Mass to be revoked. Jeremiah O'Flynn, an Irish Cistercian monk, was appointed as Prefect Apostolic of New Holland and set out from Britain for the colony, uninvited. Watched by authorities, O'Flynn secretly performed priestly duties before being arrested and deported to London. Reaction to the affair in Britain led to two further priests being allowed to travel to the colony in 1820 — John Joseph Therry and Philip Conolly. The foundation stone for the first St Mary's Church was laid on 29 October 1821 by Governor Lachlan Macquarie.

The absence of a Catholic mission in Australia before 1818 reflected the legal disabilities on Catholics in Britain and Ireland. The government therefore endorsed the English Benedictine monks to lead the early church in the colony. The Reverend William Bernard Ullathorne (1806–1889) was instrumental in influencing Pope Gregory XVI to establish the hierarchy in Australia. Ullathorne was in Australia from 1833 to 1836 as vicar-general to Bishop William Morris of Mauritius, whose jurisdiction extended over the Australian missions.

=== Emancipation and growth ===
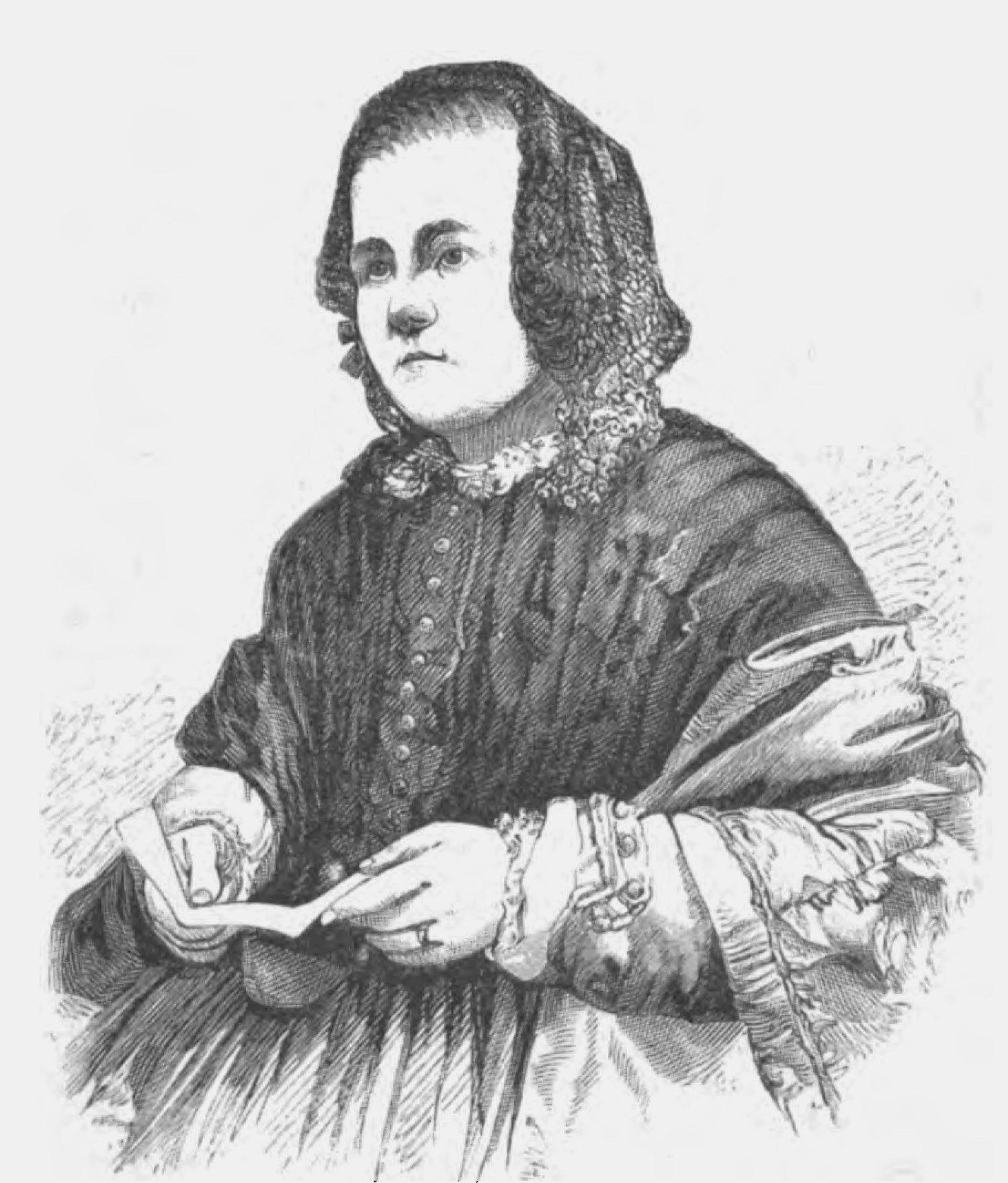
Catholic humanitarian Caroline Chisolm

The Church of England was disestablished in the colony of New South Wales by the Church Act of 1836, which also provided equal funding of Protestant and Catholic churches. Drafted by the Catholic attorney-general John Plunkett, the act established legal equality for Anglicans, Catholics and Presbyterians and was later extended to Methodists. Nevertheless, social attitudes were slow to change. A laywoman, Caroline Chisholm (1808–1877), faced discouragements and anti-Catholic feeling when she sought to establish a migrant women's shelter. She worked for women's welfare in the colonies in the 1840s, though her humanitarian efforts later won her fame in England and great influence in achieving support for families in the colony.

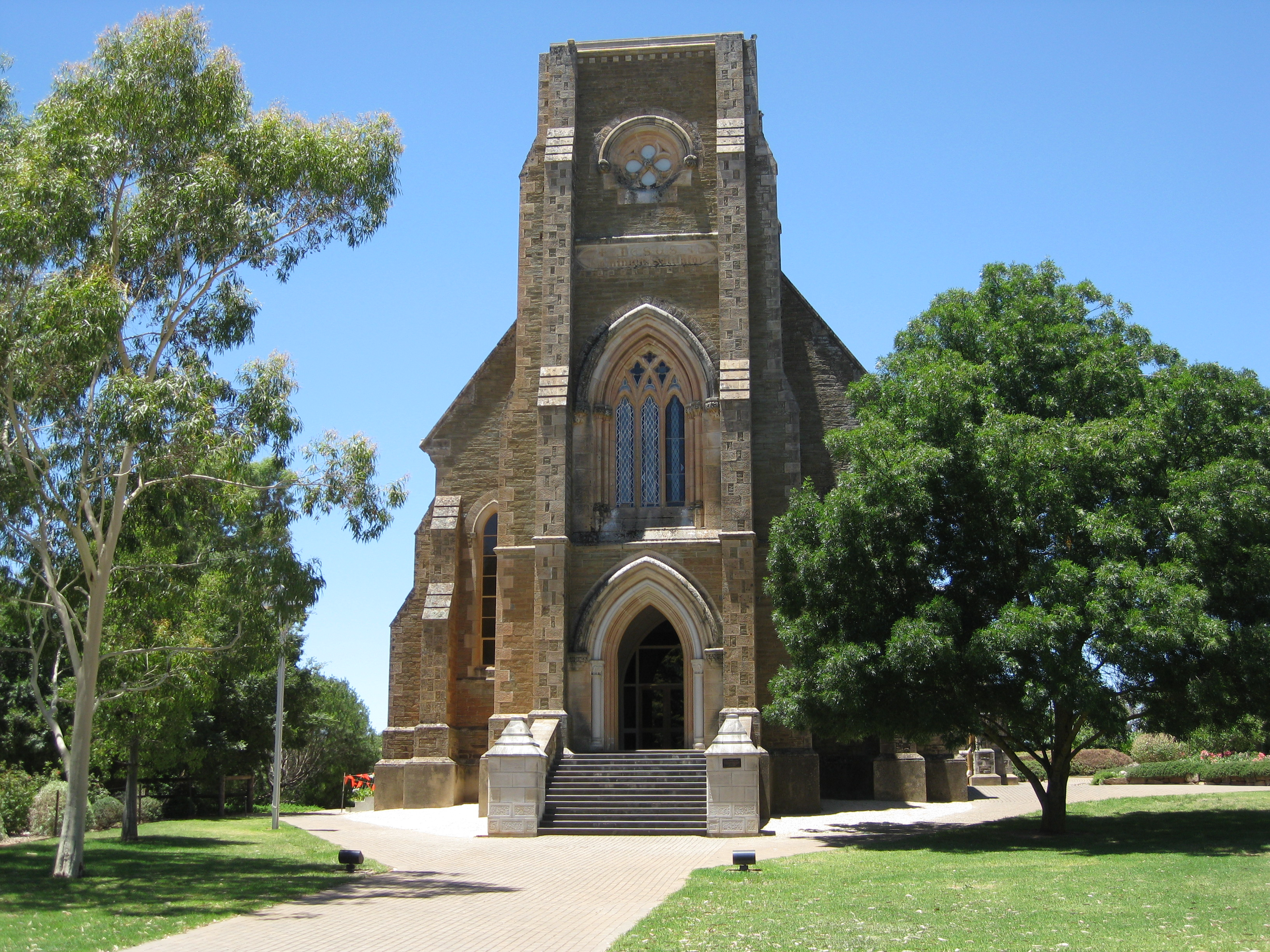
St Aloysius Church, Sevenhill, South Australia. The Jesuits were the first order of priests to enter and establish houses in South Australia, Victoria, Queensland and the Northern Territory – Austrian Jesuits established themselves in the south and north and Irish in the east.

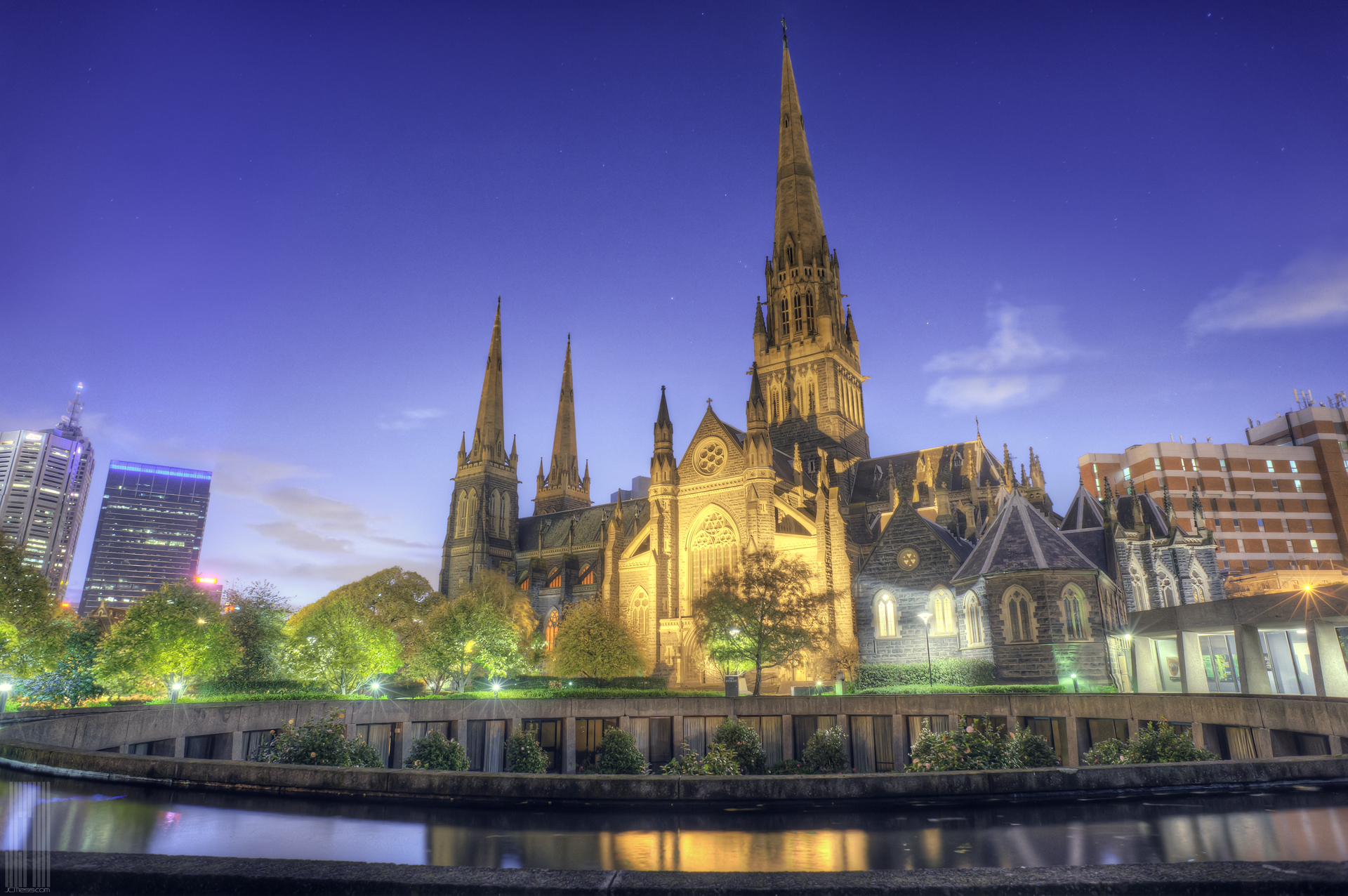
St Patrick's Cathedral, Melbourne

The church's most prominent early leader was John Bede Polding, a Benedictine monk who was Sydney's first bishop (and then archbishop) from 1835 to 1877. Polding requested a community of nuns be sent to the colony and five Irish Sisters of Charity arrived in 1838. While tensions arose between the English Benedictine hierarchy and the Irish, Ignatian-tradition religious institute from the start, the sisters set about pastoral care in a women's prison and began visiting hospitals and schools and establishing employment for convict women. In 1847, two sisters transferred to Hobart and established a school. The sisters went on to establish hospitals in four of the eastern states, beginning with St Vincent's Hospital, Sydney, in 1857 as a free hospital for all people, but especially for the poor.

At Polding's request, the Christian Brothers arrived in Sydney in 1843 to assist in schools. Again jurisdictional tensions arose and the brothers returned to Ireland. In 1857, Polding founded an Australian religious institute in the Benedictine tradition – the Sisters of the Good Samaritan – to work in education and social work. While Polding was in office, construction began on the ambitious Gothic Revival designs for St Patrick's Cathedral, Melbourne, and the final St Mary's Cathedral in Sydney.

In 1845, Polding established the Australian Holy Catholic Guild of Saints Mary and Joseph. Some parishes have memorials dedicated to deceased members and friends. One such is at St Patrick's Boorowa, New South Wales. Examples of the Guild's reporting to members and election of office bearers can be seen in the Freeman's Journal. In 1848, they met under St Patrick's Church at the intersection of George and Hunter streets and had 250 members at that time. Records of the association, from 1845 to 1996, are held at the NSW State Library and this includes a copy of the constitution of the guild.

Establishing themselves first at Sevenhill, in the newly established colony of South Australia in 1848, the Jesuits were the first religious order of priests to enter and establish houses in South Australia, Victoria, Queensland and the Northern Territory – Austrian Jesuits established themselves in the south and north and Irish in the east. The goldrush saw an increase in the population and prosperity of the colonies and called for an increase in the number of episcopal sees. When gold was discovered in late 1851, there were an estimated 9,000 Catholics in the Colony of Victoria, increasing to 100,000 by the time the Jesuits arrived 14 years later. While the Austrian priests traversed the Outback on horseback to found missions and schools, the Irish priests arrived in the east in 1860 and had by 1880 established the major schools of Xavier College in Melbourne and in Sydney St Aloysius' College and Saint Ignatius' College, Riverview – which each survive to the present.

During 1869 and 1870, some Australian-based clergy attended the first Vatican Council in Rome. Despite lobbying by English Benedictine bishops, the Irish cleric Patrick Francis Moran won the favour of Pope Leo XIII and was appointed Archbishop of Sydney in 1884, arriving in New South Wales on 8 September. A prominent figure in Australian Catholic history, he became Australia's first cardinal the following year after being summoned back to Rome, and presided over Plenary Councils of Australasia in 1885, 1895 and 1905 which laid the foundations for Church structure in the 20th century. The Australian colonies had hitherto relied heavily on immigrant clergy. In 1889, Moran founded St Patrick's College, Manly, intended to provide priests for all the colonies. Moran believed that Catholics' political and civil rights were threatened in Australia and, in 1896, saw deliberate discrimination in a situation where "no office of first, or even second, rate importance is held by a Catholic".

In Rome in 1884, Moran had met the Venerable Mary Potter and invited her to send a group of her newly established Little Company of Mary sisters to Australia in order to establish a local congregation. Six pioneering sisters arrived in Sydney in November 1885, commencing work caring for the sick and dying. Establishing a convent at Lewishman, they had nearly fifty members within just five years. In 1889 they opened a small hospital at Lewisham. Under the leadership of Mother Mary Xavier Lynch from 1899, the hospital would grow to be one of Sydney's leading general hospitals and nursing schools. Mother Mary Xavier established a new hospital at Adelaide in 1900 and Wagga Wagga in 1926, and despatched sisters to found hospitals in New Zealand and South Africa. In 1922 she became the order's first provincial of Australasia, and is remembered as one of Australia's most noted hospital and nursing administrators.

The Catholic Church also became involved in mission work among the Aboriginal people of Australia during the 19th century as Europeans came to control much of the continent. According to Aboriginal anthropologist Kathleen Butler-McIlwraith, there were many occasions when the Catholic Church attempted to advocate for Aboriginal rights, but the missionaries were also "functionaries of the Protection and Assimilation policies" of the government and so "directly contributed to the current disadvantage experienced by Indigenous Australians". The missionaries themselves argued that they protected children from dysfunctional aspects of indigenous culture.

With the withdrawal of state aid for church schools around 1880, the Catholic Church, unlike other Australian churches, put great energy and resources into creating a comprehensive alternative system of education. It was largely staffed by sisters, brothers and priests of religious institutes, such as the Christian Brothers (who had returned to Australia in 1868); the Sisters of Mercy (who had arrived in Perth in 1846); Marist Brothers, who came from France in 1872; and the Sisters of St Joseph, founded in Australia by Mary MacKillop and Fr Julian Tenison Woods in 1867. MacKillop travelled throughout Australasia and established schools, convents and charitable institutions but came into conflict with those bishops who preferred diocesan control of the institute rather than central control from Adelaide by the Josephite religious institute. MacKillop administered the Josephites as a national religious institute at a time when Australia was divided among individually governed colonies. She is today the most revered of Australian Catholics, beatified by Pope John Paul II in 1995 and canonised by Benedict XVI in 2010. Catholic schools flourished in Australia and by 1900 there were 115 Christian Brothers teaching in Australia. By 1910 there were 5000 religious sisters teaching in schools.

=== Federation ===
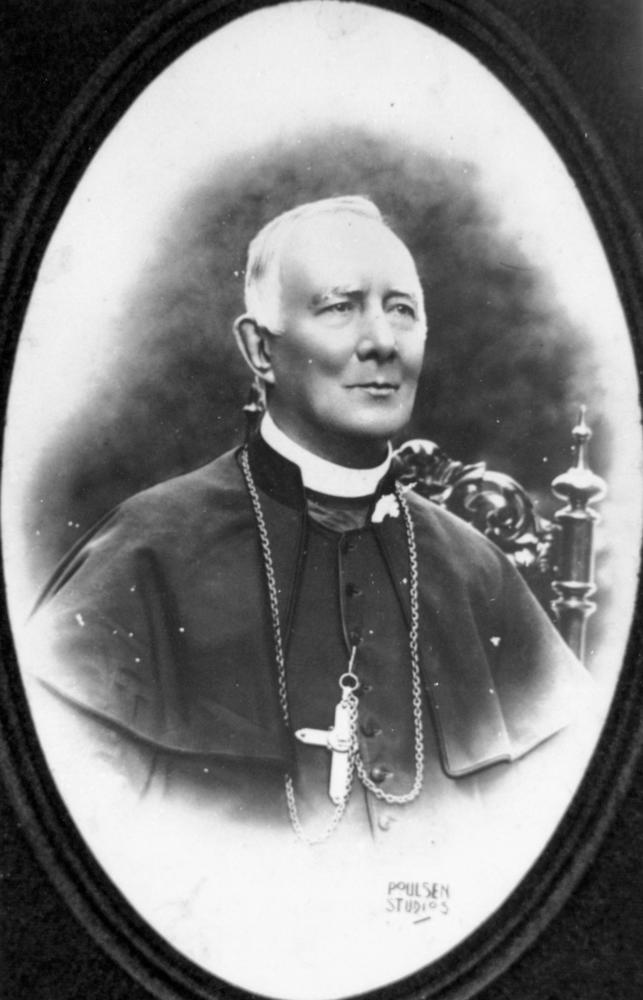
Cardinal Patrick Francis Moran was an advocate for Federation

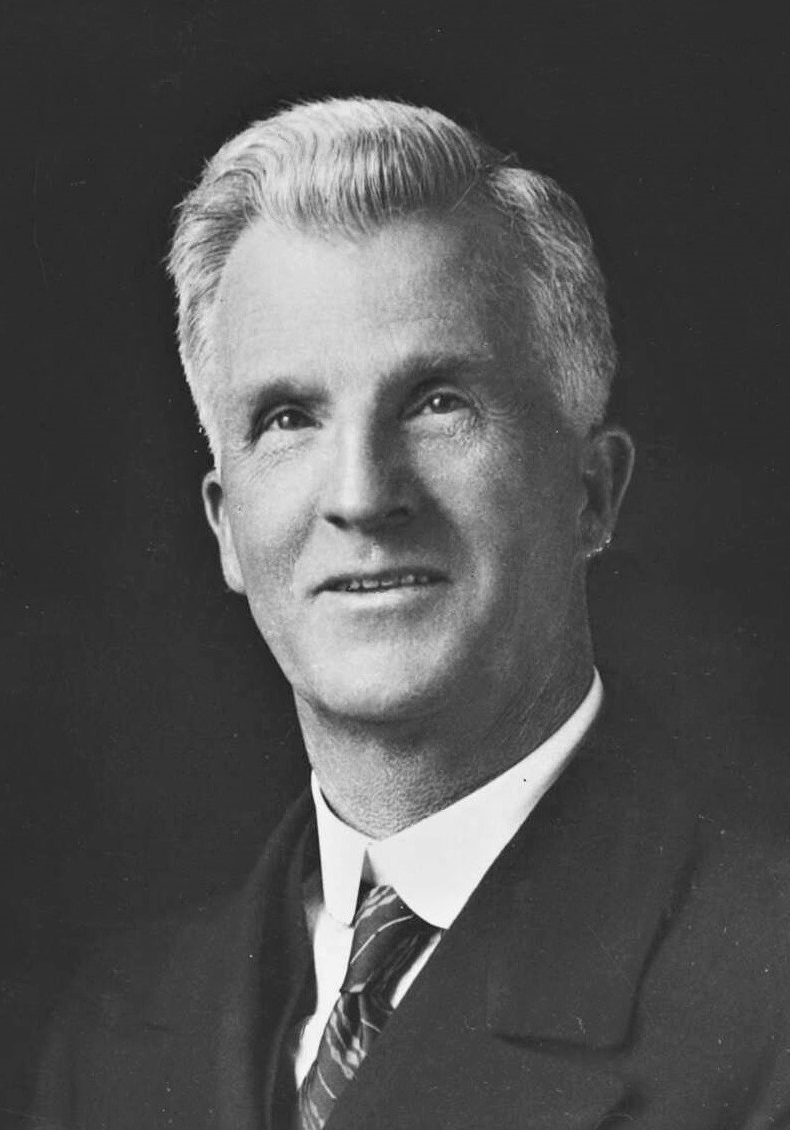
James Scullin of the Australian Labor Party was the first Catholic to become a Prime Minister of Australia

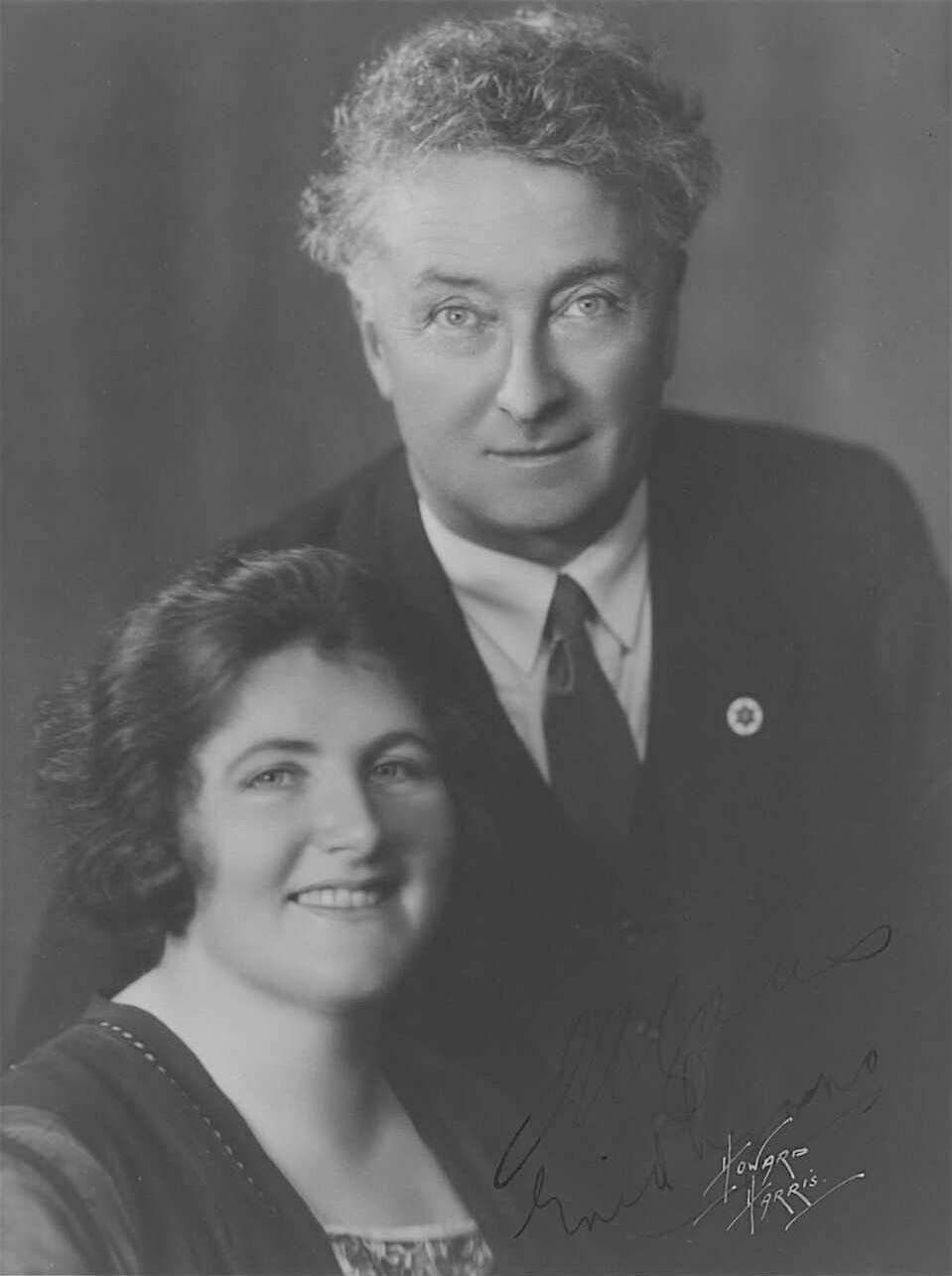
United Australia Party prime minister Joseph Lyons pictured with wife Enid Lyons, both of whom were important figures in the foundation of modern Australian conservatism

Section 116 of the Australian Constitution of 1901 to some extent prevented the new federal parliament from interfering with freedom of religion and ensured a separation of church and state throughout Australia. Australia's first Catholic cardinal, Patrick Francis Moran (1830–1911), had been a proponent of Australian Federation but in 1901 he refused to attend the inauguration ceremony of the Commonwealth of Australia because precedence was given to the Church of England. He was criticised in The Bulletin for speaking against racist immigration laws and he alarmed Catholic conservatives by supporting Trade Unionism and the newly formed Australian Labor Party.

The Catholic Church was rooted in the working class Irish communities. Moran, the Archbishop of Sydney from 1884 to 1911, believed that Catholicism would flourish with the emergence of the new nation through Federation in 1901, provided that his people rejected "contamination" from foreign influences such as anarchism, socialism, modernism and secularism. Moran distinguished between European socialism as an atheistic movement and those Australians calling themselves "socialists"; he approved of the objectives of the latter while feeling that the European model was not a real danger in Australia. Moran's outlook reflected his wholehearted acceptance of Australian democracy and his belief in the country as different and freer than the old societies from which its people had come. Moran thus welcomed the Labor Party and the Catholic Church stood with it in opposing conscription in the referendums of 1916 and 1917. The hierarchy had close ties to Rome, which encouraged the bishops to support the British Empire and emphasize Marian piety.

=== Between the wars ===
Another Irish cleric, Archbishop Daniel Mannix (1864–1963) of Melbourne, was a outspoken voice against conscription during World War I and against British policy in Ireland. He was also a fervent critic of contraception and the Treaty of Versailles, saying it would lead to a greater war than the one just ended. In the Melbourne St Patrick's day parade of 1920, Archbishop Mannix participated with fourteen Victoria Cross recipients. Yet despite early 20th century sectarian feeling, Australia elected its first Catholic prime minister, James Scullin, of the Australian Labor Party in 1929 – decades before the Protestant majority of the United States would elect John F. Kennedy as its first Catholic president. His successor, Joseph Lyons, a devout Irish Catholic, split from Labor to form the fiscally conservative United Australia Party – predecessor to the modern Liberal Party of Australia. His wife, Dame Enid Lyons, a Catholic convert, became the first female member of the Australian House of Representatives and later first female member of cabinet in the Menzies Government. With the place of Catholics in the British Empire still complicated by the recent Irish War of Independence and centuries of imperial rivalry with Catholic European nations, as prime minister, Lyons travelled to London in 1935 for the silver jubilee celebrations of King George V and faced anti-Catholic demonstrations in Edinburgh, then visited his ancestral homeland of Ireland and also had an audience with the Pope in Rome.

The Australian congregation known as Our Lady's Nurses for the Poor was founded by Melbourne-born mystic Eileen O'Connor and Fr Ted McGrath in a rented home at Coogee in 1913. A deeply religious youth, O'Connor had suffered a damaged spine when she was three years old and lived in a wheelchair with a painful disability. McGrath, the parish priest of Coogee, found accommodation for her widowed mother and family and was impressed by her courage. O'Connor told McGrath that she had experienced a visitation from the Virgin Mary, and McGrath shared with her his hope to establish a congregation of nurses to serve the poor. Eventually, a group of seven laywomen gathered around O'Connor and elected her as their first superior. Directed by the largely bed-ridden O'Connor, they visited the sick poor and nursed the frail aged. O'Connor died in 1921 of chronic tuberculosis of the spine and exhaustion. She was 28. Initially a group of laywomen, Our Lady's Nurses for the Poor later formed themselves into a religious community of sisters under vows and their work continues in Sydney, Newcastle and Macquarie Fields. In 2018, Australia's bishops voted to initiate her cause for sainthood and the Holy See granted her the title Servant of God.

In October 1916, the Catholic Women's Social Guild (now Catholic Women's League) was formed in Fitzroy, Victoria, and Mary Glowrey became the inaugural president. Glowrey was one of the first women to study medicine at Melbourne University. She later went to India to become a missionary nun, founding the largest non-government healthcare system in that country. She was accorded the title Servant of God in 2013 and her cause for sainthood is underway.

The Australian Army Chaplains Department was promulgated in 1913, and 86 Catholic chaplains went on to serve in the army during World War One. As well as conducting church parades and religious services, chaplains organised activities to improve the morale and welfare of the troops. Fr John Fahey from Perth was the longest-serving front-line chaplain of the conflict. Assigned to the 11th battalion, he was the first chaplain ashore on Gallipoli, after disregarding orders to stay on the ship.

During the Second World War, the Australian-administered Territory of New Guinea was invaded by Japanese forces. Some 333 Martyrs of New Guinea are remembered from all denominations during WW2, including 197 Catholics. On Rabaul, Australians and Europeans found refuge at the Vunapope Catholic Mission, until the Japanese overwhelmed the island and took them prisoner in 1942. The local Bishop Leo Scharmach, a Pole, convinced the Japanese that he was German and to spare the internees. A group of indigenous Daughters of Mary Immaculate (FMI Sisters) then refused to give up their faith or abandon the Australians and are credited with keeping hundreds of internees alive for three and half years by growing food and delivering it to them over gruelling distances. Some of the Sisters were tortured by the Japanese and gave evidence during war crimes trials after the war. Indigenous Rabaul man Peter To Rot found himself in charge of the mission at Rakunai after the internment of the Europeans. He took on their work of teaching the faith, presiding over baptisms, prayer and marriages and caring for the sick and POWs. When the Japanese outlawed these practises, he continued them in secret, was exposed by a collaborator and sent to a labour camp where he was executed. Pope John Paul II declared him a martyr in 1993 and beatified him in 1995. Pope Leo XIV canonised Peter To Rot in 2025.

=== Post-war immigration: A more diverse church ===
Until about 1950, the Catholic Church in Australia was overwhelmingly Irish in its ethos. Most Catholics were descendants of Irish immigrants and the church was mostly led by Irish-born priests and bishops. A number of rural areas had high proportions of Irish and a strongly Catholic culture. From 1950 the ethnic composition of the church began to change, with the assimilation of Irish Australians and the arrival of Eastern European Displaced Persons from 1948 and more than one million Catholics from countries such as Italy, Malta, the Netherlands, Germany, Croatia and Hungary, and later Filipinos, Vietnamese, Lebanese and Poles around the 1980s. There are now also strong Chinese, Korean and Hispanic Catholic communities.

For a long time, Irish-Australians had a close political association with the Labor Party. The changing ethnic composition of Australian Catholicism and shifting political allegiances of Australian Catholics saw Catholic layman B. A. Santamaria, the son of Italian immigrants, lead a movement of working class Catholics against Communism in Australia and the formation of his Democratic Labor Party (DLP) in 1955. The DLP was formed over concerns of Communist influence over the trade unions and Labor Party. The movement was not approved by the Vatican, but it siphoned a proportion of the Catholic vote away from the Labor Party, contributing to the success of the newly formed Liberal Party of Robert Menzies, which held power from 1949 to 1972, which, in return for DLP preferences, secured state aid for Catholic schools in Australia in 1963. Along with a sharp decline in sectarianism in post-1960s Australia, sectarian loyalty to political parties has diminished and Catholics have been well represented within the conservative Liberal and National parties. Brendan Nelson became the first Catholic to lead the Liberal Party in 2007. Former prime minister Tony Abbott is a former seminarian who won the party leadership after defeating two other Catholic candidates for the post. In 2008, Tim Fischer, a Catholic and former deputy prime minister in the Howard government, was nominated by the Labor prime minister, Kevin Rudd, as the first resident Australian ambassador to the Holy See since 1973, when diplomatic relations with the Vatican and Australia were first established.

=== Post Second Vatican Council ===
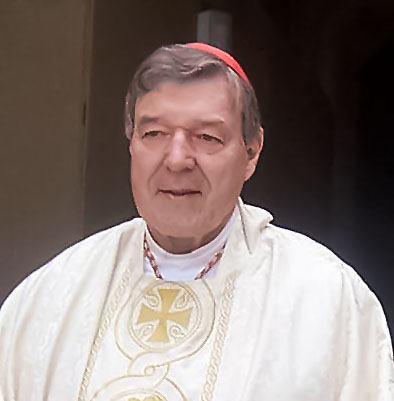
The Late Cardinal Pell in 2006

Since the Second Vatican Council of the 1960s, the Australian church has experienced a decline in vocations to the religious life, leading to a priest shortage. On the other hand, lay leadership in education and other areas has expanded, and about 20% of Australian school students attend a Catholic school. While the numbers of nuns serving in Australian health facilities declined, the church maintained a strong presence in health care. The Sisters of Charity continued their mission among the sick, opening Australia's first HIV AIDS ward at St Vincent's Hospital, Sydney, in the 1980s. Declining vocations and increasing complexities in the health care technologies and management saw religious institutes like the Sisters of Charity and Sisters of Mercy amalgamating their efforts and divesting themselves of daily management of hospitals.

Following Vatican II, new styles of ministry were tried by Australian religious. Some rose to national prominence. Fr Ted Kennedy began one such ministry in Sydney's inner city Redfern presbytery in 1971 – an area with a large Aboriginal population. Working closely with Catholic Aboriginal laywoman "Mum" Shirl Smith, he developed a theology which held that the poor had special insights into the meaning of Christianity, worked as an advocate for Aboriginal rights and often challenged the civil and church establishment on questions of conscience. In 1989, Jesuit lawyer Fr Frank Brennan founded Uniya, a centre for social justice and human rights research, advocacy, education and networking. Uniya focused much of its attention on the plight of refugees, asylum seekers, and Indigenous reconciliation. In 1991, Fr Chris Riley formed Youth Off The Streets, a community organisation working for young people who are "chronically homeless, drug dependent and recovering from abuse". Originally a food van in Sydney's King's Cross, it has grown to be one of the largest youth services in Australia, offering crisis accommodation, residential rehabilitation, clinical services and counselling, outreach programs, drug and alcohol rehabilitation, specialist Aboriginal services, education and family support. Melbourne priest Father Bob Maguire began parish work in the 1960s, but became a youth media personality in 2004 with the beginning of a series of collaborations with irreverent satirist John Safran on SBS TV and Triple J radio.

The year 1970 saw the first visit to Australia by a Pope, Paul VI. Pope John Paul II was the next Pope to visit Australia in 1986. At Alice Springs, the Pope made an historic address to indigenous Australians, in which he praised the enduring qualities of Aboriginal culture, lamented the effects of dispossession of and discrimination; called for acknowledgment of Aboriginal land rights and reconciliation in Australia; and said that the church in Australia would not reach its potential until Aboriginal people had made their "contribution to her life and until that contribution has been joyfully received by others".

In 1988, the Archbishop of Sydney, Edward Bede Clancy was created a cardinal and during the Australian Bicentenary celebrations led the religious ceremonies for the opening of Parliament House, Canberra. Pope John Paul II visited Australia for the second time in 1995, to perform the rite of beatification for Mary MacKillop, founder of Australia's Josephite Sisters, before a crowd of 250,000.

From the late 1980s, cases of abuse within the Catholic Church and other child care institutions began to be exposed in Australia. In 1996, the church issued a document, Towards Healing, which it described as seeking to "establish a compassionate and just system for dealing with complaints of abuse". In 2001, an apostolic exhortation from Pope John Paul II condemned incidents of sex abuse in Oceania. Impetus for the Towards Healing protocols was in part led by Bishop Geoffrey Robinson, who would later call for large scale systemic reform of the church globally in his 2007 book Confronting Power and Sex in the Catholic Church: Reclaiming the Spirit of Jesus. The Australian Catholic Bishops Conference did not endorse the book. Pat Power, the Auxiliary Bishop of Canberra & Goulburn, wrote in 2002 that "the current crisis around sexual abuse is the greatest since the Reformation. At stake is the Church's moral authority, its credibility, its ability to interpret the 'signs of the times' and its capacity to confront the ensuing questions." Pope Benedict XVI officially apologised to victims during World Youth Day 2008 in Sydney and celebrated a Mass with four victims of clerical sexual abuse in the chapel of St Mary's Cathedral, Sydney, and listened to their stories.

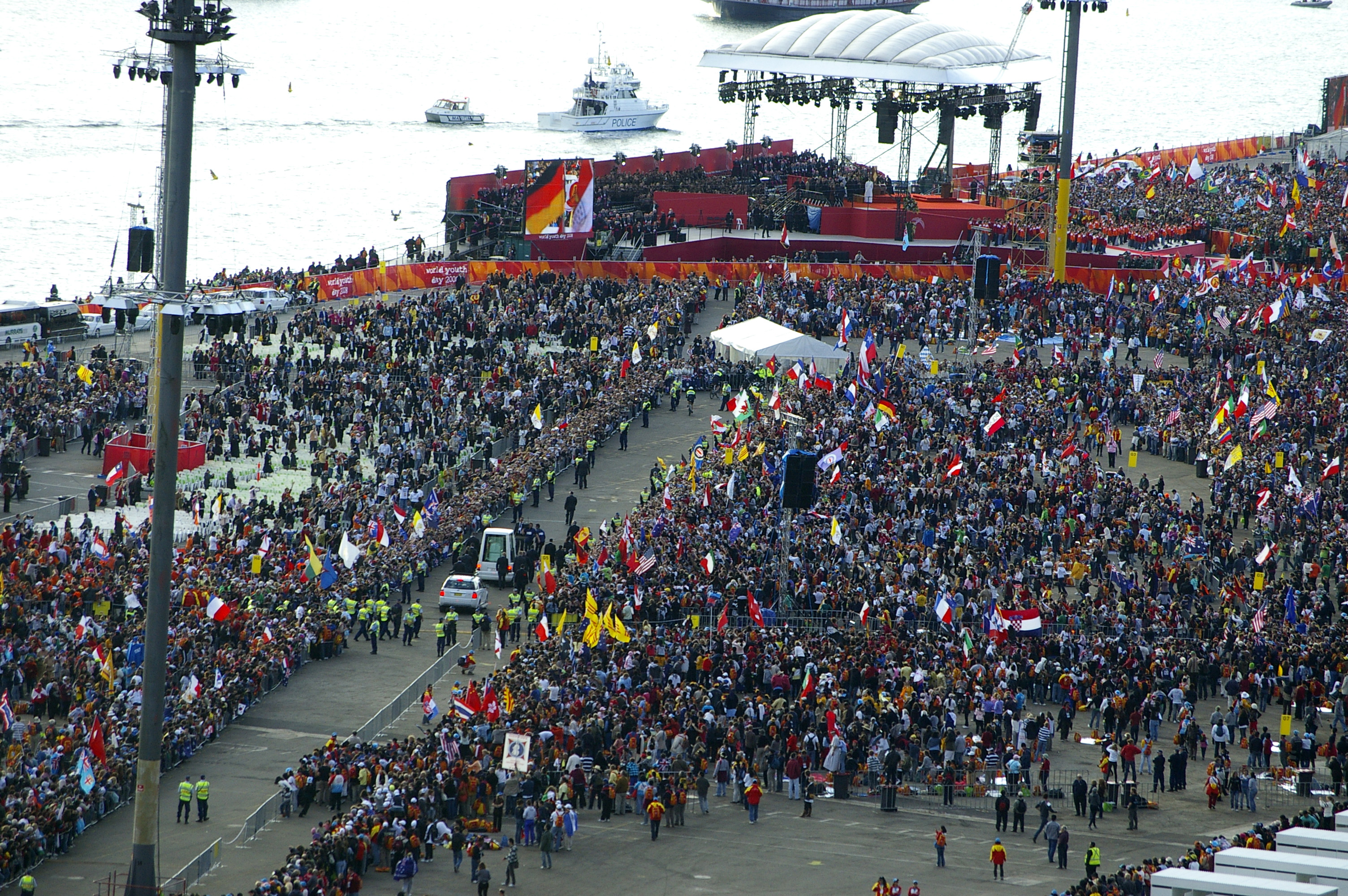
Pope Benedict XVI arriving at Barangaroo, Sydney, for World Youth Day 2008

In 2001, in Rome, Pope John Paul II apologised to Aboriginal and other indigenous people in Oceania for past injustices by the church: "Aware of the shameful injustices done to indigenous peoples in Oceania, the Synod Fathers apologised unreservedly for the part played in these by members of the church, especially where children were forcibly separated from their families." Church leaders in Australia called on the Australian government to offer a similar apology.

In 2001, George Pell became the eighth Archbishop of Sydney and, in 2003, became a cardinal. Pell supported Sydney's bid to host World Youth Day 2008. In July 2008, Sydney hosted the massive youth festival led by Pope Benedict XVI. Around 500,000 welcomed the pope to Sydney and 270,000 watched the Stations of the Cross. More than 300,000 pilgrims camped out overnight in preparation for the final Mass, where final attendance was between 300,000 and 400,000 people.

In February 2010, Pope Benedict XVI announced that Mary MacKillop would be recognised as the first Australian saint of the Catholic Church. She was canonised on 17 October 2010 during a public ceremony in St Peter's Square. An estimated 8,000 Australians were present in the Vatican City to witness the ceremony. The Vatican Museum held an exhibition of Aboriginal art to honour the occasion titled "Rituals of Life". The exhibition contained 300 artefacts which were on display for the first time since 1925.

In the late 20th and early 21st century, Catholicism in Australia has been growing numerically, while remaining relatively stable as a proportion of the population and facing a long-term decline in numbers of people following vocations to the religious life. In 2016, the Catholic education sector ran 1,738 schools, accounting for some 20.2% of Australian school students. There were also two Catholic universities – University of Notre Dame Australia and the Australian Catholic University. Catholic Social Services Australia, the church's peak national body for social services, had 52 member organisations providing services to hundreds of thousands of people each year. Catholic Health Australia was the largest non-government provider grouping of health, community, and aged care services.

The church was among the secular and religious institutions examined at the 2013-2017 Royal Commission into Institutional Responses to Child Sexual Abuse, which reported that abuse cases by Catholic personnel had peaked in the 1970s, with around 4400 cases and alleged cases over the 6 decades prior to the inquiry. In 2017, there were 5.5 million Australian Catholics. Gerard Henderson stated that statistics presented to the Royal Commission indicated that children were safer in a Catholic religious institution in Australia during the years studied than in any other religious institution (state institutions were not studied, so a statistical comparison could not be made).

== Social and political engagement ==
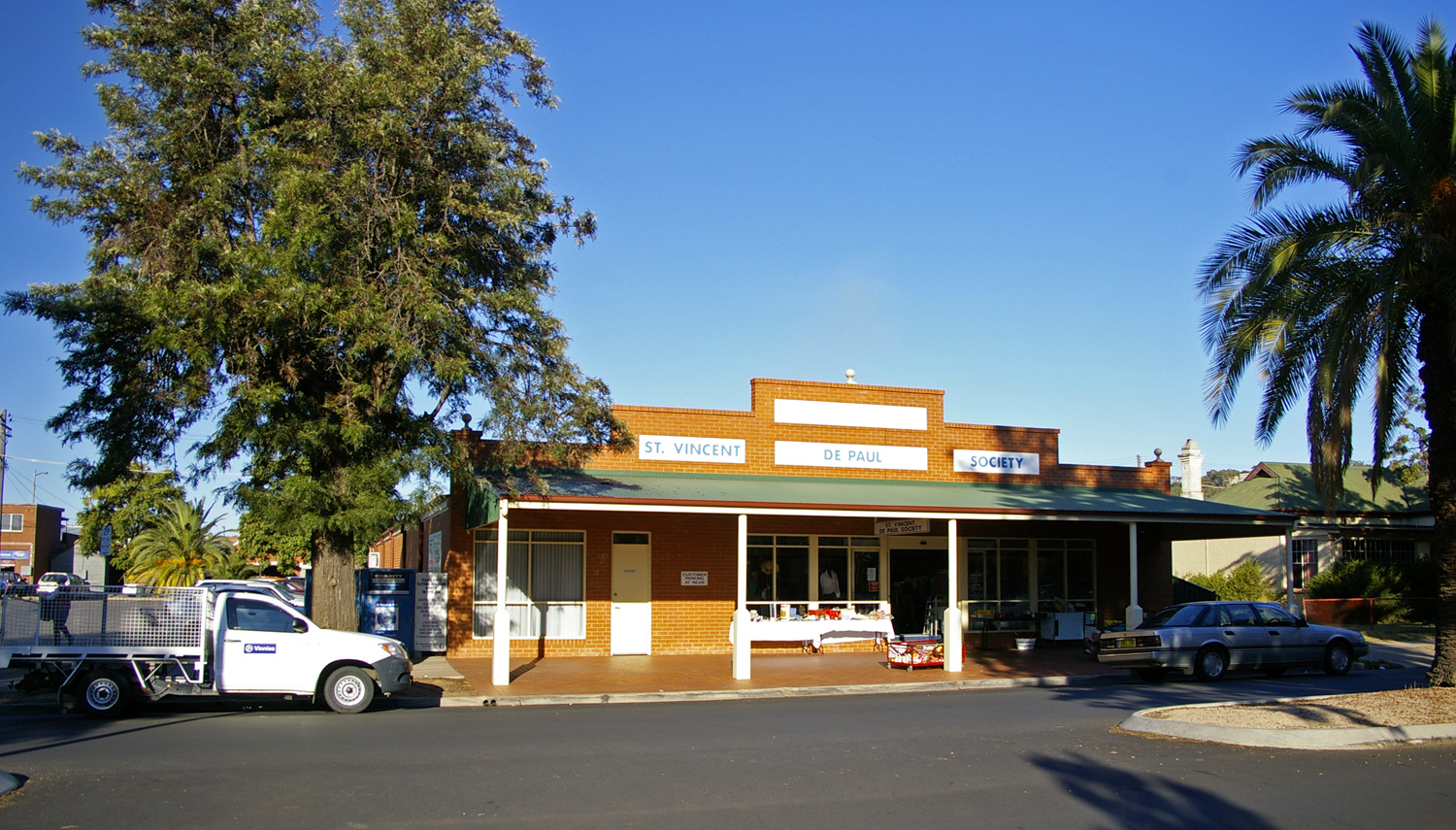
St Vincent de Paul Society Opportunity shop in Wagga Wagga, New South Wales.

=== Introduction ===
Catholic people and charitable organisations, hospitals and schools have played a prominent role in welfare and education in Australia ever since colonial times when Catholic laywoman Caroline Chisholm helped single, migrant women and rescued homeless girls in Sydney. In his welcoming address to the Catholic World Youth Day 2008 in Sydney, the prime minister, Kevin Rudd, said that Christianity had been a positive influence on Australia: "It was the church that began first schools for the poor, it was the church that began first hospitals for the poor, it was the church that began first refuges for the poor and these great traditions continue for the future".

=== Welfare ===
A number of Catholic organisations are providers of social welfare services (including residential aged care and the Job Network) and education in Australia. Australia-wide these include: Centacare, CatholicCare Caritas Australia, Jesuit Refugee Service, St Vincent de Paul Society, Youth Off The Streets. Two religious institutes founded in Australia which engaged in welfare and charity work are the Sisters of St Joseph of the Sacred Heart and the Sisters of the Good Samaritan. Many international Catholic religious institutes also work in welfare, such as the Little Sisters of the Poor who work in aged care. Catholic Social Services Australia is the peak body for Catholic welfare agencies and has 54 member organisations in metropolitan, regional and remote Australia. Members include diocesan-based Centacare and CatholicCare agencies and those under the stewardship of religious orders.

=== Health ===
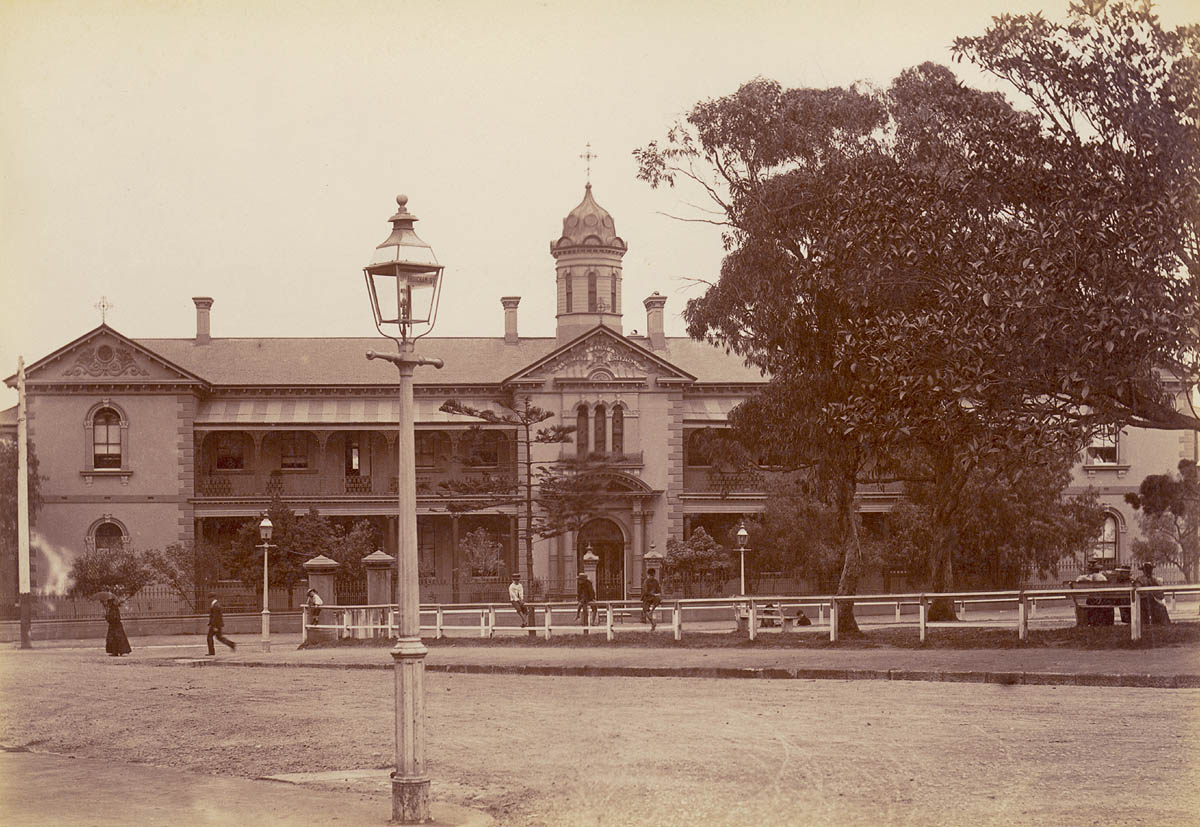
St Vincent's Hospital, Sydney, in the 1900s.

Catholic Health Australia is the largest non-government provider grouping of health, community and aged care services in Australia. These do not operate for profit and range across the full spectrum of health services, representing about 10% of the health sector and employing 35,000 people.

Religious institutes founded many of Australia's hospitals. Irish Sisters of Charity arrived in Sydney in 1838 and established St Vincent's Hospital, Sydney, in 1857 as a free hospital for the poor. The Sisters went on to found hospitals, hospices, research institutes and aged care facilities in Victoria, Queensland and Tasmania. At St Vincent's they trained leading surgeon Victor Chang and opened Australia's first AIDS clinic. In the 21st century, with more and more lay people involved in management, the sisters began collaborating with Sisters of Mercy Hospitals in Melbourne and Sydney. Jointly the group operates four public hospitals, seven private hospitals and 10 aged care facilities.

The English Sisters of the Little Company of Mary arrived in Australia in 1885 and went on to establish hospitals and other health services in several states and territories. Their health, aged care and community ministries in Australia are now administered through Little Company of Mary Health Care, which operates nationally under the trading name Calvary Health Care, a charitable not-for-profit provider of hospitals, residential aged care, retirement living and community care services.

The Little Sisters of the Poor, who follow the charism of Saint Jeanne Jugan to "offer hospitality to the needy aged", arrived in Melbourne in 1884 and now operate four aged care homes in Australia.

In 1895, Perth's Bishop Matthew Gibney sent a request for help to the Sisters of St John of God in Wexford, Ireland to care for people suffering from typhoid fever during the 1890s gold rush. They established a hospital in Kalgoorlie in the late 1890s, followed shortly by another in the Perth suburb of Subiaco. These services developed into St John of God Health Care, which now operates 24 hospitals and facilities across Western Australia, New South Wales, Victoria, and New Zealand.

=== Education ===
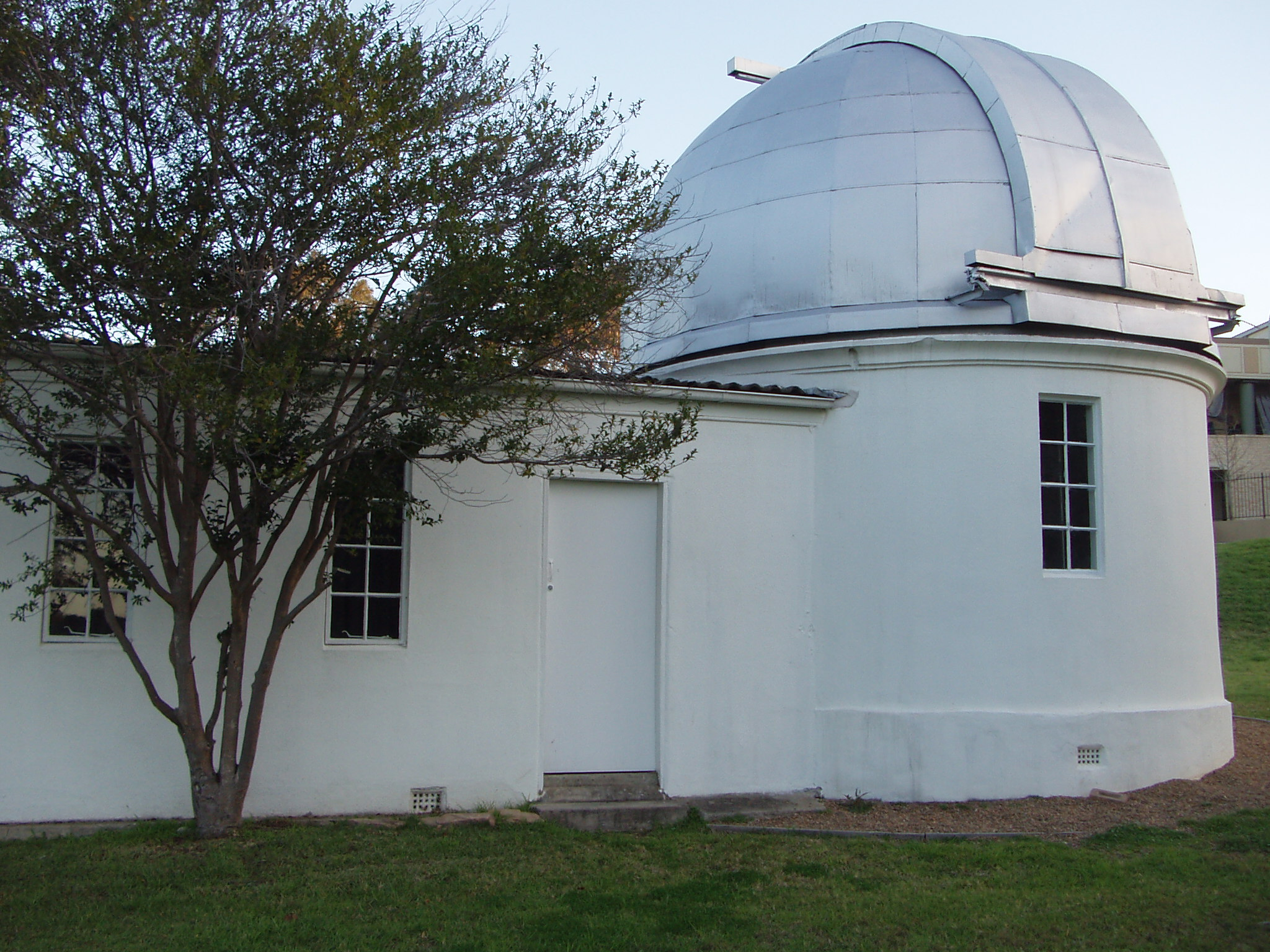
The historic observatory at Saint Ignatius' College, Riverview was founded by the distinguished Jesuit scientist Edward Francis Pigot in 1908.

By 1833, there were around ten Catholic schools in the Australian colonies. Today one in five Australian students attend Catholic schools. There are over 1700 Catholic schools in Australia with more than 750,000 students enrolled, employing almost 60,000 teachers. Mary MacKillop was a 19th-century Australian religious sister who founded an educational religious institute, the Sisters of St Joseph of the Sacred Heart. Other Catholic religious institutes involved in education in Australia have included: Sisters of Mercy, Marist Brothers, Christian Brothers, Loreto Sisters, Benedictine Sisters and Jesuits.

As with other classes of non-government schools in Australia, Catholic schools receive funding from the Commonwealth Government. Church schools range from elite, high cost schools (which generally offer extensive bursary programs for low-income students) to low-fee local schools. Notable schools include the Jesuit colleges of St Aloysius and Saint Ignatius' College, Riverview in Sydney, Saint Ignatius' College, Adelaide and Xavier College in Melbourne; the Marist Brothers St Joseph's College, Hunters Hill, the Christian Brothers' High School, Lewisham, the Society of the Sacred Heart's Rosebay Kincoppal School, the Institute of the Blessed Virgin Mary's Loreto Kirribilli, the Sisters of Mercy's Monte Sant' Angelo Mercy College, the Christian Brothers' St Edmund's College, Canberra and Aquinas College, Perth – however, the list and range of Catholic primary and secondary schools in Australia is long and diverse and extends throughout metropolitan, regional and remote Australia: see Catholic Schools in Australia

The Australian Catholic University opened in 1991 following the amalgamation of four Catholic tertiary institutions in eastern Australia. These institutions had their origins in the 1800s, when religious institutes became involved in preparing teachers for Catholic schools and nurses for Catholic hospitals. The University of Notre Dame Australia opened in Western Australia in December 1989 and now has over 9,000 students on three campuses in Fremantle, Sydney and Broome.

=== Politics ===
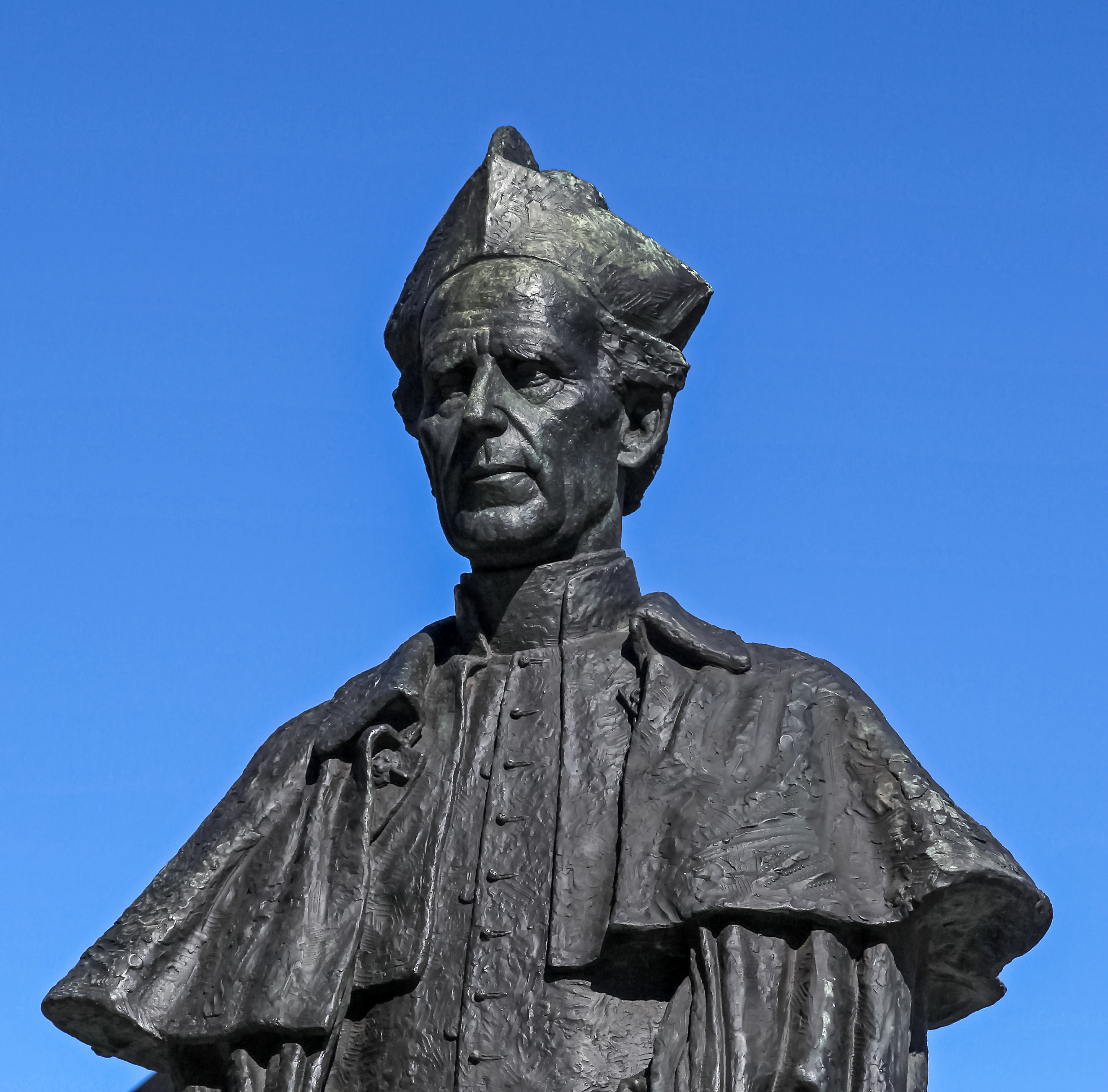
Archbishop Daniel Mannix of Melbourne was a controversial voice against conscription during World War I and against British policy in Ireland.

Church leaders have often involved themselves in political issues in areas they consider relevant to Christian teachings. In early Colonial times, Catholicism was restricted but Church of England clergy worked closely with the governors. Early Catholic missionary William Ullathorne criticised the convict system, publishing a pamphlet, The Horrors of Transportation Briefly Unfolded to the People, in Britain in 1837. Sydney's first archbishop, John Bede Polding, was influential in the preparation of the Australian bishops' pastoral letter on Aboriginal People in 1869 which advocated for Aboriginal rights and dignity.

Australia's first Catholic cardinal, Patrick Francis Moran (1830–1911), was politically active. He was a proponent of Australian Federation; he denounced anti-Chinese legislation as "unchristian" and opposed antisemitism. He became an advocate for women's suffrage and he stood for election to the Australasian Federal Convention in 1897, but in 1901 he refused to attend the inauguration of the Commonwealth of Australia because precedence was given to the Church of England. He alarmed conservatives by supporting trade unionism and "Australian socialism". Archbishop Daniel Mannix of Melbourne was a controversial voice against conscription during World War I and against British policy in Ireland.

Mum (Shirl) Smith, a celebrated Redfern community worker, assisted by the Sisters of Charity, worked in the courts and organised prison visitations, medical and social assistance for Aboriginal People. Fr Ted Kennedy of Redfern and Fr Frank Brennan, a Jesuit, have been high-profile Catholic priests engaged in the cause of Aboriginal rights.

In 1999, Cardinal Edward Bede Clancy wrote to the then prime minister, John Howard, urging him to send an armed peacekeeping force to East Timor to end the violence engulfing that country. In 2006, an Australian Greens senator, Kerry Nettle, called on the health minister, Tony Abbott, to refrain from debating the abortion drug RU486 because he was Catholic. Cardinal George Pell concerned himself publicly with traditional issues of Christian doctrine, such as supporting marriage and opposing abortion, but also raised questions about government policies such as the Work Choices industrial relations reforms and the mandatory detention of asylum seekers.

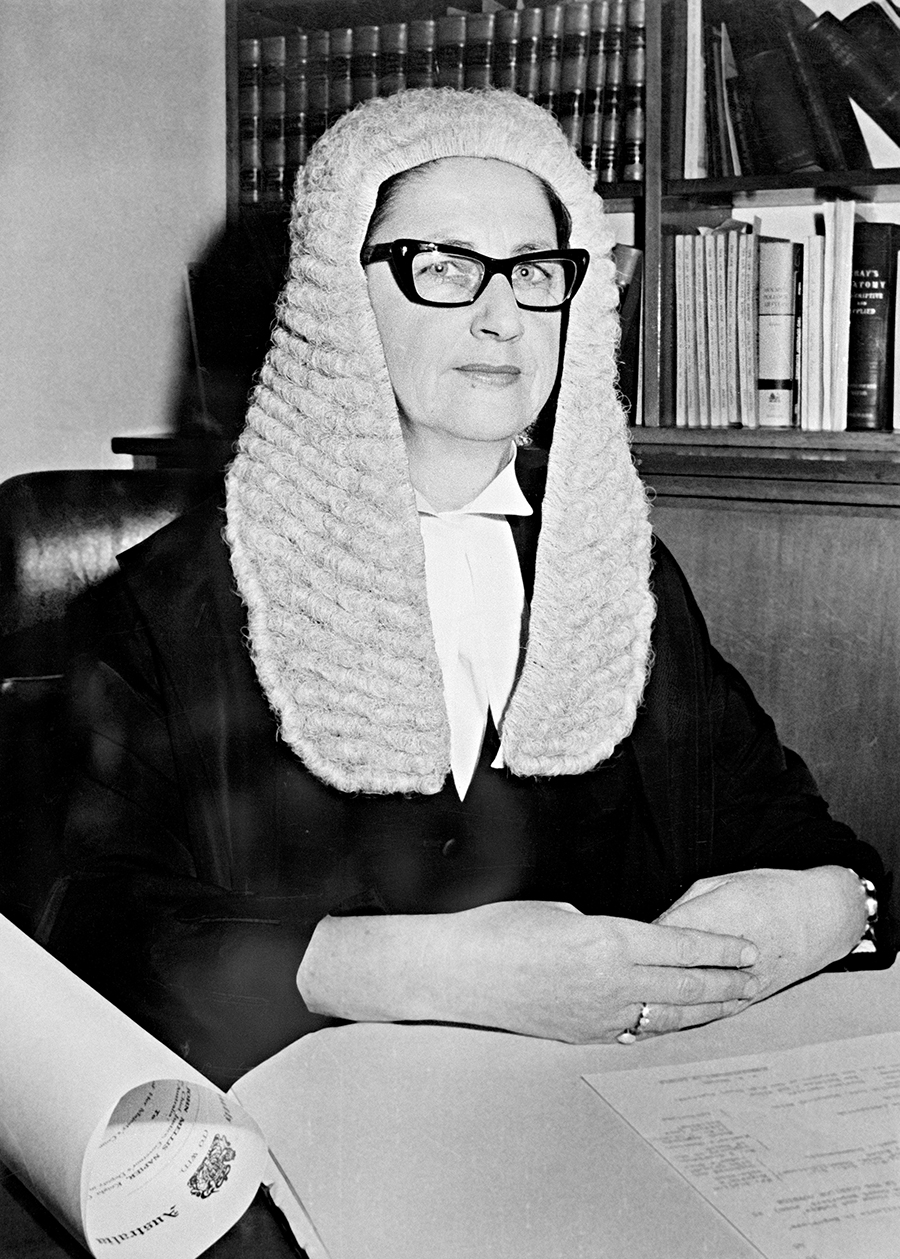
Dame Roma Mitchell.

Australian Catholic politicians

Australia elected its first Catholic prime minister, James Scullin of the Australian Labor Party in 1929. He was succeeded by Joseph Lyons of the United Australia Party who was prime minister from 1932 to 1939, and remains Australia's longest serving Catholic prime minister. The first woman elected to the House of Representatives was his wife, Enid Lyons (United Australia Party), who was a Catholic convert. Australian Catholic women have achieved a number of significant milestones in the history of Australian politics. The first woman to be elected as leader of a state or territory was Catholic Rosemary Follett, who won the first ACT election in 1989. The first woman Premier of NSW was Labor's Kristina Keneally, a Catholic with a master's degree in Catholic systemic theology. Dame Roma Mitchell, a devout Catholic, served as Governor of South Australia from 1991 to 1996, the first woman to be appointed governor of an Australian state. Dame Roma had also been a Supreme Court Judge, University Chancellor, Human Rights campaigner and advocate for Aboriginal people. Following her death, the ABC reported "Those who were close to Dame Roma Mitchell say her deep Catholic faith guided every aspect of her life, giving her the strength and ambition to campaign for social change and her philosophy of generosity and kindness".

The Australian Labor Party had largely been supported by Catholics until layman B. A. Santamaria formed the Democratic Labor Party over concerns of Communist influence over the trade union movement in the 1950s. The war-time prime minister, John Curtin (Labor), was raised Catholic. Ben Chifley (Labor) also served as prime minister from 1945 to 1949. In more recent decades, Catholics have led all major parties and served as Prime Ministers and Opposition leader. Labor prime ministers Paul Keating (1991–1996) and Kevin Rudd (2007–2010, 2013) were both raised Catholic (though Rudd now identifies as an Anglican). Tim Fischer was Deputy Prime Minister and leader of the National Party between 1996 and 1999, was a practising Catholic and later served as the Australian Ambassador to the Holy See between 2008 and 2012.

The three Liberal Party Leaders of the Opposition between 2007 and 2013 - Brendan Nelson, Malcolm Turnbull and Tony Abbott - were all Catholics. Abbott brought the Party to office in 2013 and was succeeded by Turnbull as Prime Minister in 2015. As the connection of the conservative parties to Catholicism has increased in recent decades, so the formerly strong connection between Labor and Catholicism has waned. Nevertheless, since losing office in 2013, the Labor Party has been led by Jesuit educated Bill Shorten and the current Prime Minister Anthony Albanese, who describes himself as a "cultural Catholic". Shorten, now an Anglican, wrote in his book The Common Good, that he is grateful for his Jesuit education and takes inspiration from the invocation of the Jesuit Pedro Arrupe to be "men for others". Politicians including Prime Minister Tony Abbott, and NSW Premier John Fahey studied for the priesthood before politics. Michael Tate served as a minister in the Labor Hawke government and then, after politics, became a Catholic priest.

== Arts and culture ==
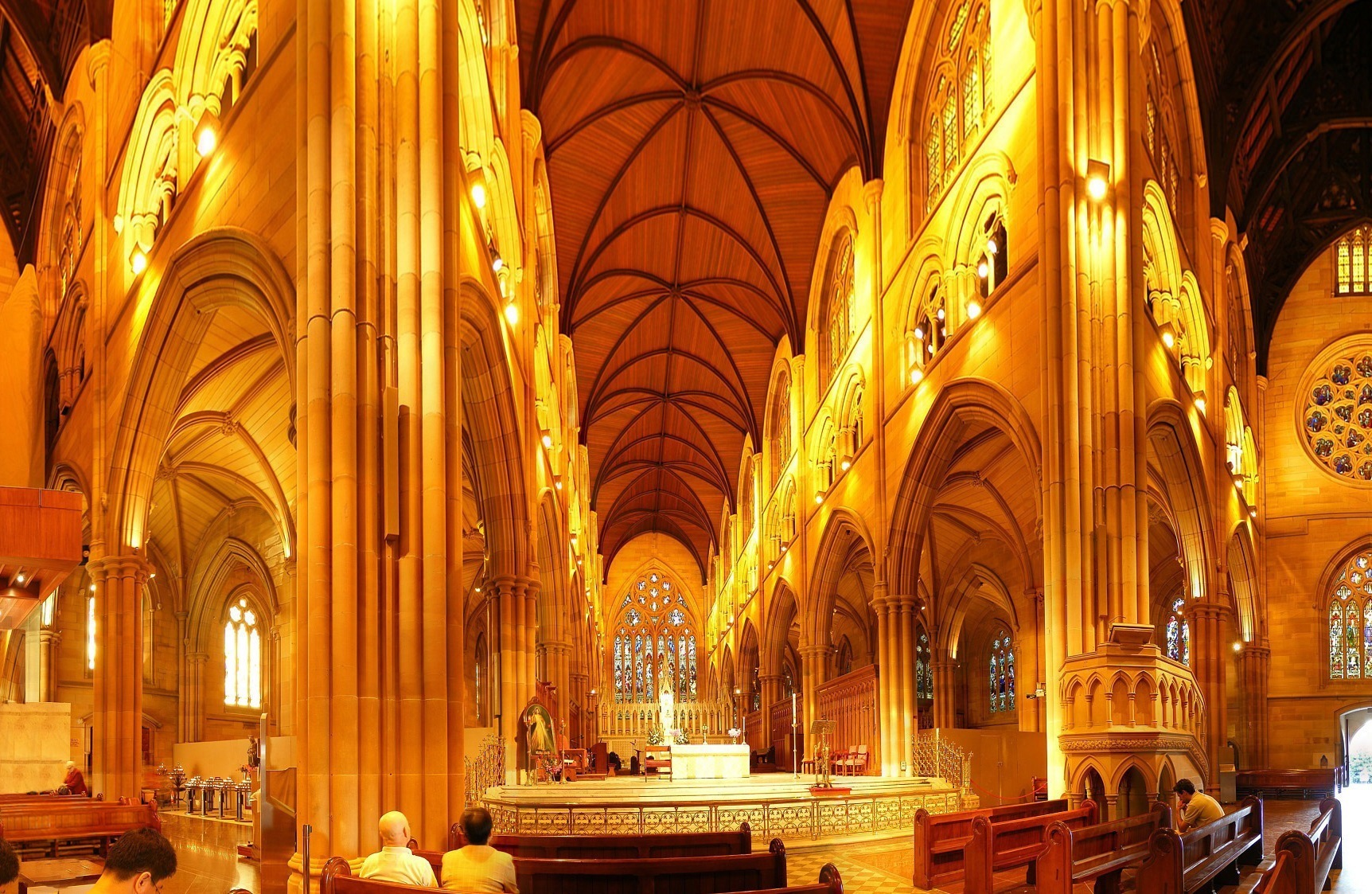
St Mary's Cathedral, Sydney, interior.

=== Architecture ===
Most towns in Australia have at least one Christian church. St Mary's Cathedral, Sydney, follows a conventional English cathedral plan, cruciform in shape, with a tower over the crossing of the nave and transepts and twin towers at the west front with impressive stained glass windows. With a length of 106.7 metres (350 ft) and a general width of 24.4 metres (80 ft), it is Sydney's largest church. Built to a design by William Wardell from a foundation stone laid in 1868, the spires of the cathedral were not finally added until the year 2000. Wardell also worked on the design of St Patrick's Cathedral, Melbourne – among the finest examples of ecclesiastical architecture in Australia. Wardell's overall design was in Gothic Revival style, paying tribute to the mediaeval cathedrals of Europe. Largely constructed between 1858 and 1897, the nave was Early English in style, while the remainder of the building is in Decorated Gothic.

Adelaide, the capital of South Australia, has long been known as the City of Churches. North of Adelaide 130 kilometres (81 mi) is the Jesuit old stone winery and cellars at Sevenhill, founded by Austrian Jesuits in 1848. A rare Australian example of Spanish missionary style exists at New Norcia, Western Australia, founded by Spanish Benedictine monks in 1846. A number of notable Victorian era chapels and edifices were also constructed at church schools across Australia.

Along with community attitudes to religion, church architecture changed significantly during the 20th century. St Monica's Cathedral in Cairns was designed by architect Ian Ferrier and built in 1967–68 following the form of the original basilica model of the early churches of Rome, adapted to a tropical climate and to reflect the changes to Catholic liturgy mandated at Vatican II. The cathedral was dedicated as a memorial to the Battle of the Coral Sea which was fought east of Cairns in May 1942. The "Peace Window" stained glass was installed on the 50th anniversary of the end of World War II. In the later 20th century, distinctly Australian approaches were applied at places such as Jamberoo Benedictine Abbey, where natural materials were chosen to "harmonise with the local environment" and the chapel sanctuary is of glass overlooking rainforest. Similar design principles were applied at Thredbo Ecumenical Chapel built in the Snowy Mountains in 1996.

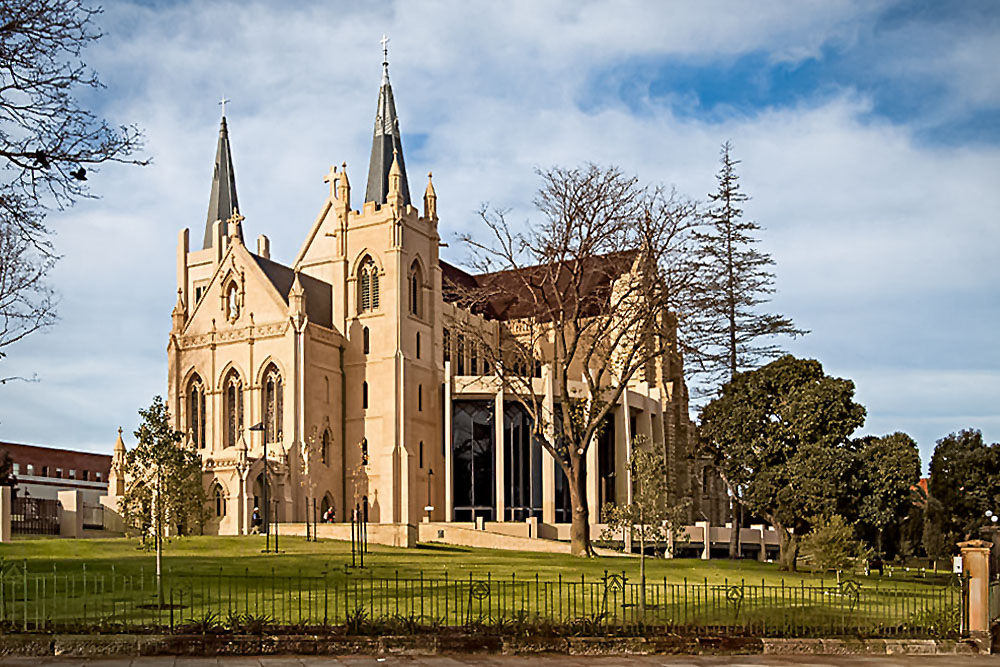
St Mary's Cathedral, Perth

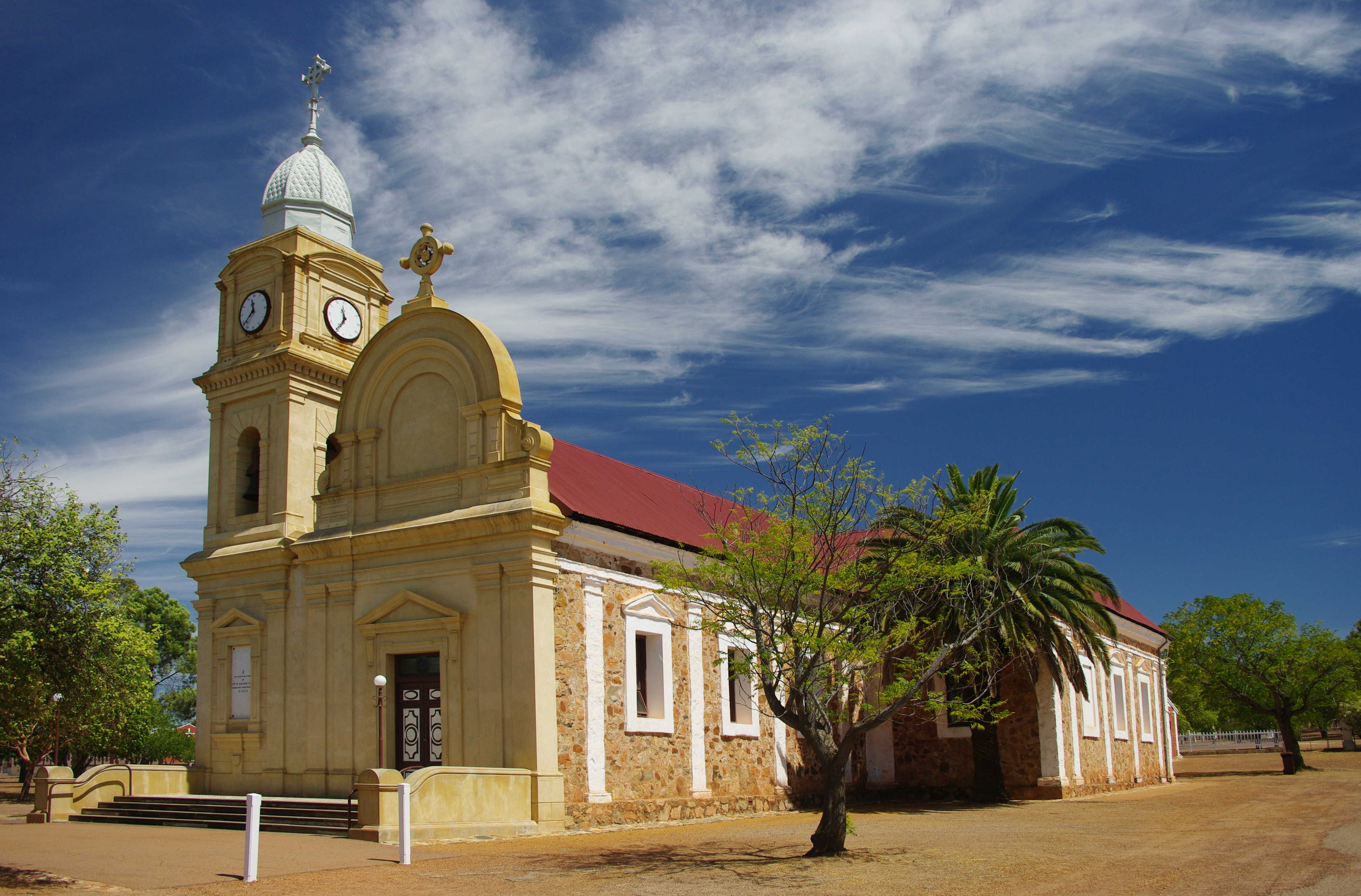
New Norcia, Western Australia

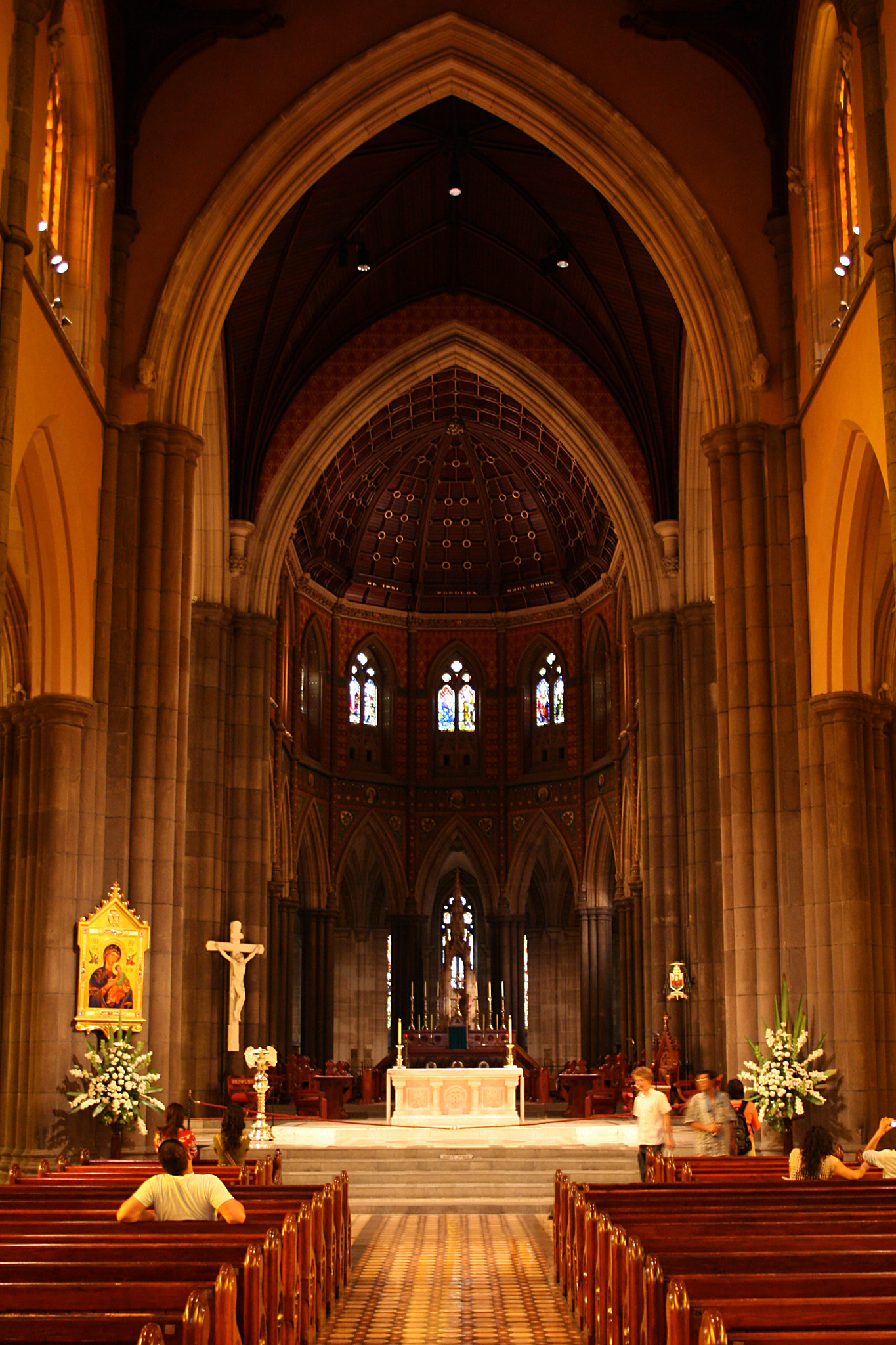
St Patrick's Cathedral, Melbourne

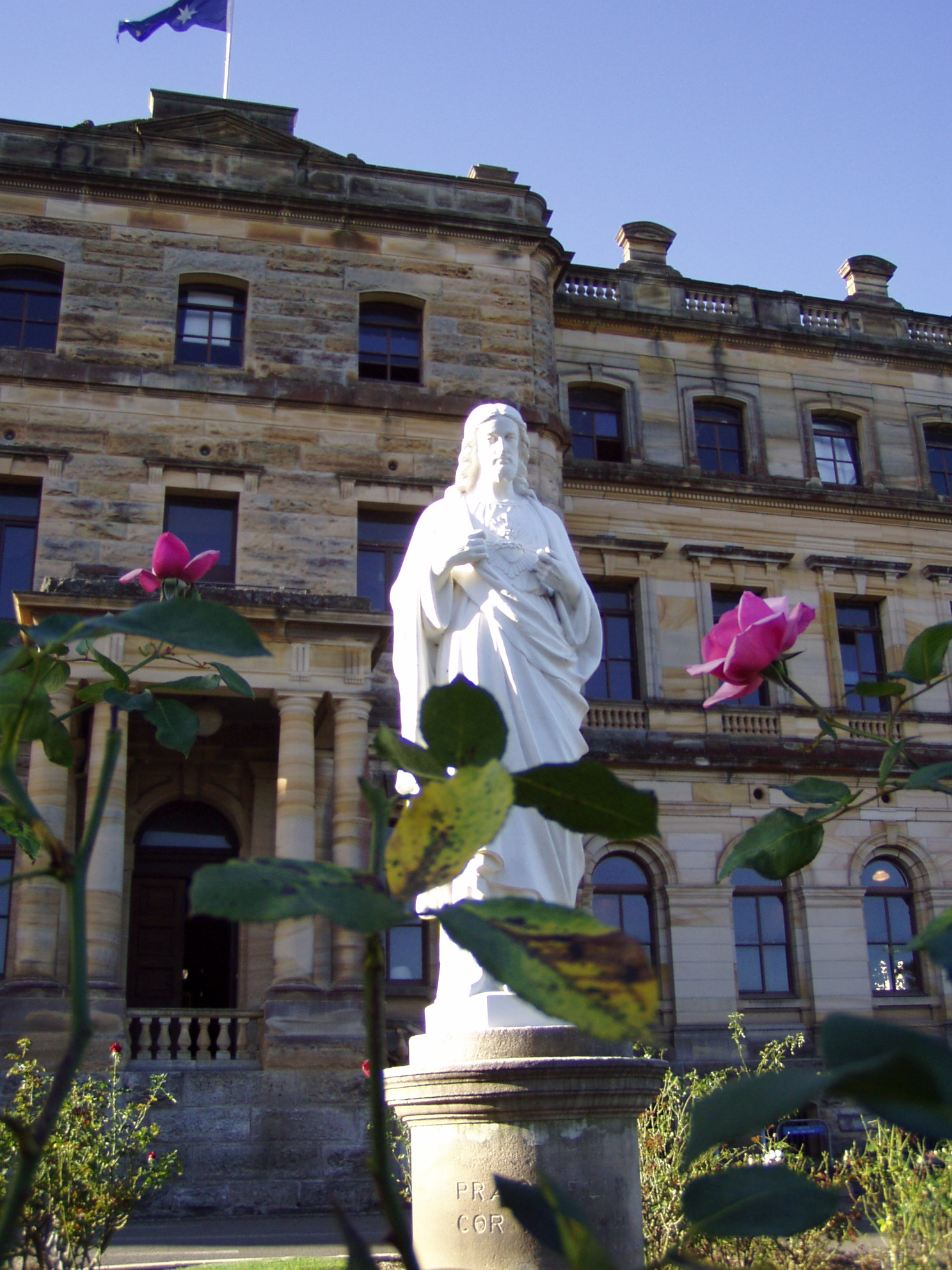
Saint Ignatius' College, Riverview

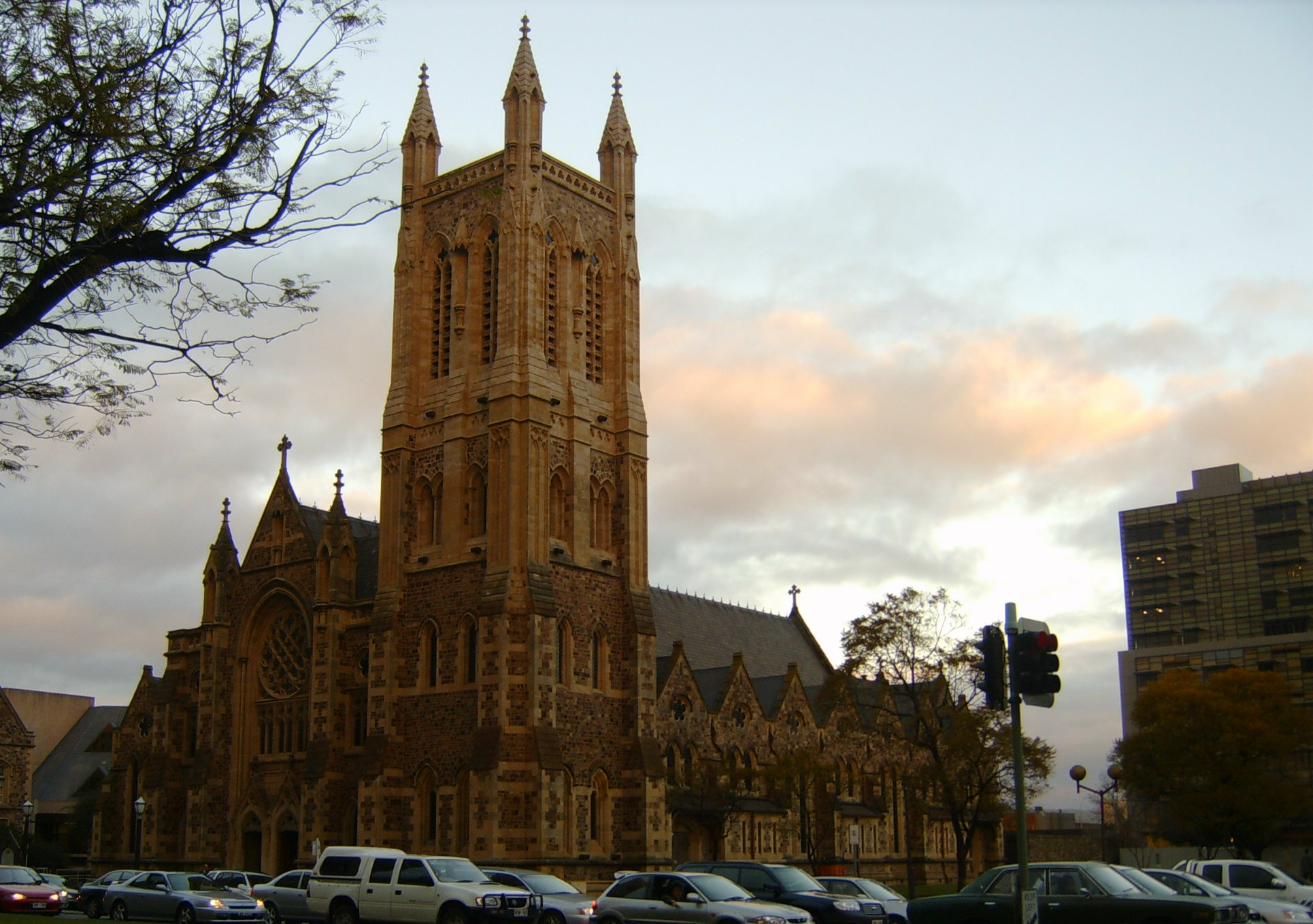
St Francis Xavier's Cathedral, Adelaide

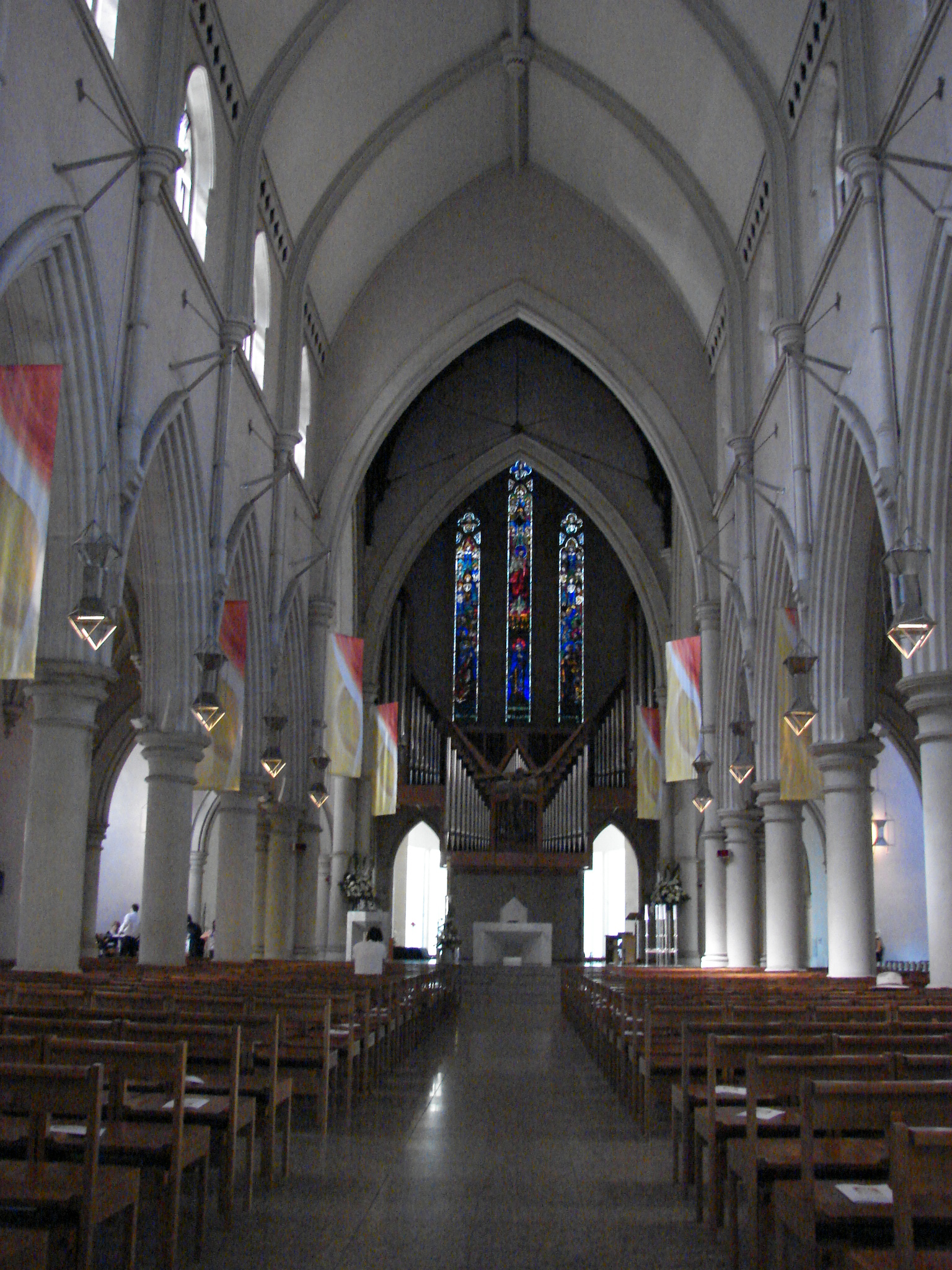
The Cathedral of St Stephen, Brisbane

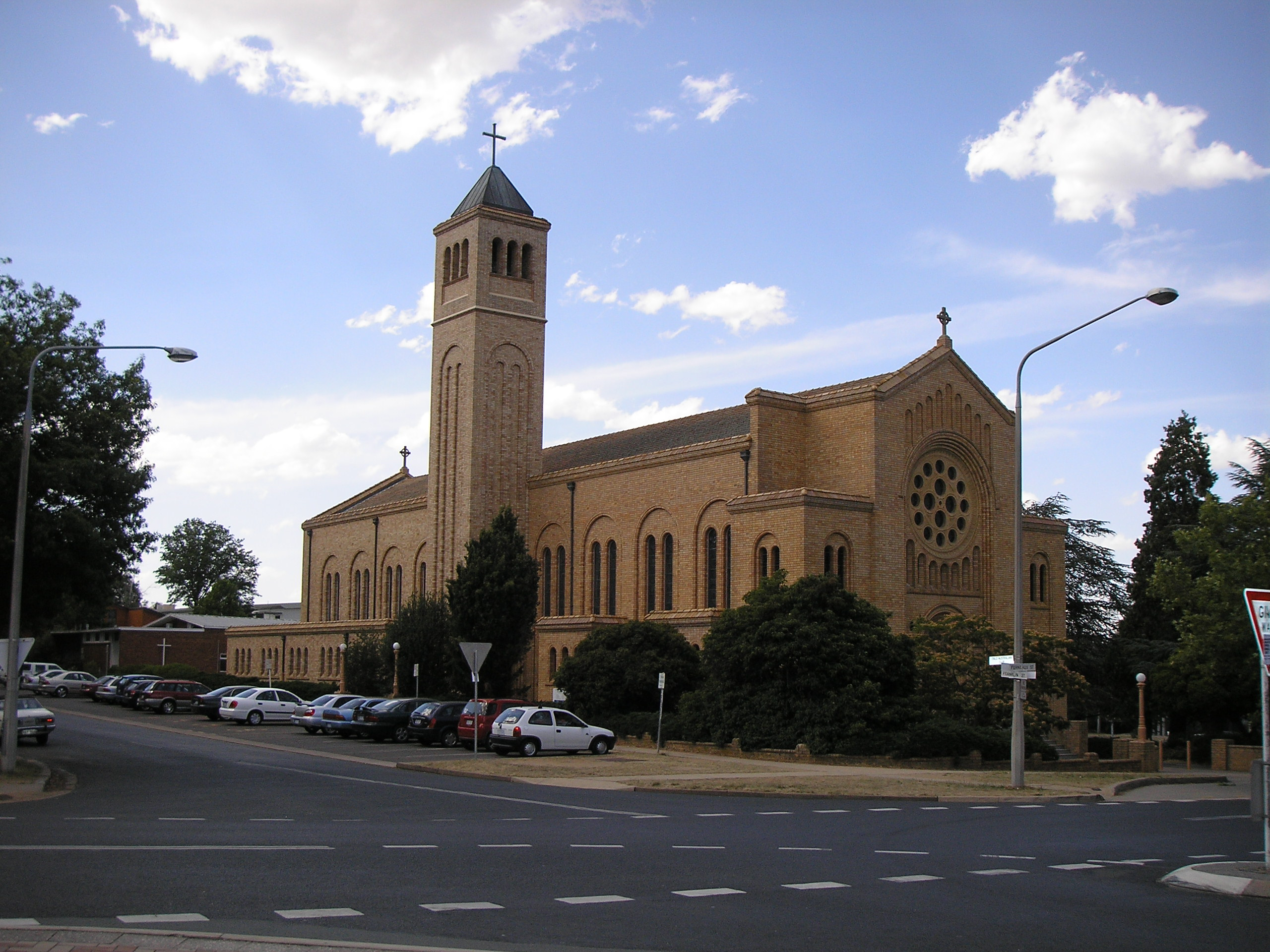
St Christopher's Cathedral, Canberra

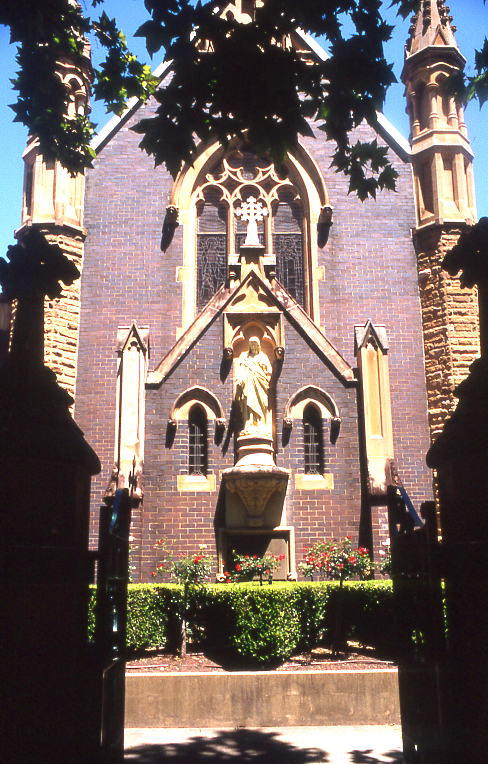
Mary MacKillop Chapel, in North Sydney

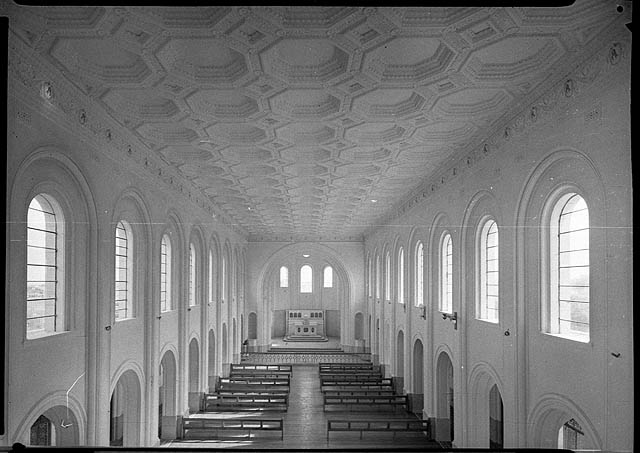
St Joseph's College, Hunters Hill Chapel, 1940

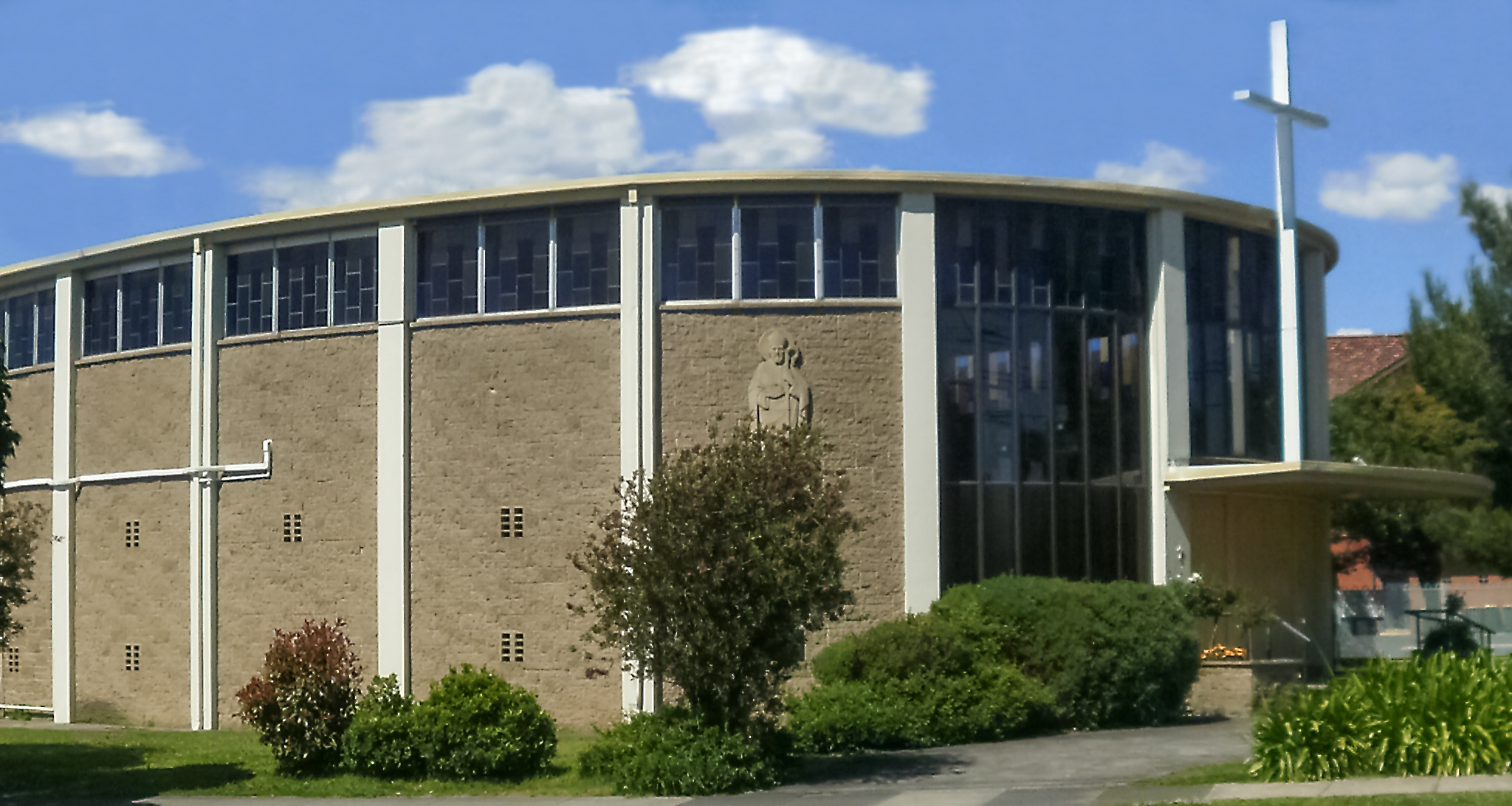
St Patricks Church Murrumbeena in Victoria

=== Film and television ===
Australian films on Catholic themes have included:

- Molokai: The Story of Father Damien (1999), directed by Paul Cox and starring David Wenham. The film recounts the life of the Belgian Saint Fr Damien of Molokai who devoted his life to the Kalaupapa Leprosy Settlement on the Hawaiian island of Molokai.
- Mary (1994), written and directed by Kay Pavlou and starring Lucy Bell, a biopic recounting the life and works of Mary MacKillop, Australia's first saint of the Catholic Church.
- The Passion of the Christ (2004) was directed and co-written by Australian trained actor-director Mel Gibson (who was raised a Traditionalist Catholic in Australia).
- Oranges and Sunshine (2010), directed by Ken Loach and starring Emily Watson, Hugo Weaving and David Wenham. The film is based on the true story of Margaret Humphreys, an English social worker who uncovers the scandal of a scheme to forcibly relocate poor children to Australia and Canada. Many of the children suffered sexual, physical and emotional abuse at the hands of the Christian Brothers in Australia.
- The Devil's Playground (1976) directed by Fred Schepisi and starring Simon Burke, Nick Tate, Arthur Dignam and John Frawley. The film is semi-autobiographical and tells the story of 13-year-old Tom Allen, training to be a religious Brother in the De La Salle Order.

Television programs on Catholic themes have included:

- Revelation (2020) directed by Nial Fulton and Sarah Ferguson. A three-part documentary on the sexual abuse of children by priests and religious brothers. Ferguson interviewed Father Vincent Ryan and Brother Bernard McGrath during their criminal trials in Sydney.
- The Devil's Playground (2014), directed by Rachel Ward and Tony Krawitz and starring Simon Burke, John Noble, Don Hany, Jack Thompson and Toni Collette. The series picks up 35 years after the events of Fred Schepisi's film. Tom Allen, now in his 40s is a respected Sydney psychiatrist and father of two children. After accepting an offer to counselling priests, he uncovers a scandal.
- Sisters of War (2010) is a telemovie based on the true story of two Australian women, Lorna Whyte, an army nurse and Sister Berenice Twohill, a Catholic nun from New South Wales who survived as prisoners of war in Papua New Guinea during World War II.
- Brides of Christ (1991), starring Naomi Watts and guest starring Russell Crowe, was a television miniseries produced by the Australian Broadcasting Corporation (ABC). Set in a Sydney convent school, it dealt with the struggles of both the nuns and the young students to adapt to the many social changes taking place within the church and the outside world during the 1960s.
- The Abbey (2007), an ABC documentary series filmed in the Jamberoo Benedictine Abbey, followed five women from very different backgrounds and with very different views about spirituality as they lived a 33-day program introduction to monastic living devised and implemented by the nuns.

Coverage of religion is part of the ABC's Charter obligation to reflect the character and diversity of the Australian community. Its religious programs include coverage of Catholic (and other) worship and devotion, explanation, analysis, debate and reports. Catholic Church Television Australia is an office with the Australian Catholic Office for Film & Broadcasting and develops television programs for Aurora Community Television on Foxtel and Austar in Australia.

=== Literature ===
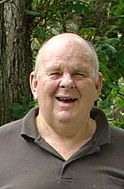
Les Murray, Catholic poet (1938–2019)

The body of literature produced by Australian Catholics is extensive. During colonial times, the Benedictine missionary William Ullathorne (1806–1889) was a notable essayist writing against the Convict Transportation system. Later Cardinal Moran (1830–1911), a noted historian, wrote a History of the Catholic Church in Australasia. More recent Catholic histories of Australia include The Catholic Church and Community in Australia (1977) by Patrick O'Farrell and Australian Catholics (1987) by Edmund Campion.

Notable Catholic poets have included Christopher Brennan (1870–1932); James McAuley (1917–1976); Bruce Dawe (1930–2020) and Les Murray (1938–2019). Murray and Dawe were among Australia's foremost contemporary poets, noted for their use of vernacular and everyday Australian themes. Emblematic of the Christian poets could be McAuley's rejection of Modernism in favour of Classical culture:

Christ, you walked on a sea
But you cannot walk in a poem,
Not in our century.
There's something deeply wrong
Either with us or with you.

Many Australian writers have examined the lives of Christian characters, or have been influenced by Catholic schooling. Australia's best-selling novel of all time, The Thorn Birds by Colleen McCullough, writes of the temptations encountered by a priest living in the Outback. Many contemporary Australian writers have attended or taught at Catholic schools

Catholic news publications have existed since 1839. They currently include The Catholic Weekly from Sydney; The Catholic Leader, published by the Brisbane Archdiocese; and Eureka Street Magazine which is concerned with public affairs, arts, and theology and is run by the communication division of the Jesuit religious order. Australian Catholics is also published quarterly by Jesuit Communications Australia.

=== Music ===
St Mary's Cathedral Choir, Sydney, is the oldest musical institution in Australia, from origins in 1817. Major Catholic-raised recording artists from Johnny O'Keefe to Paul Kelly have recorded Christian spirituals. Paul Kelly's Meet Me in the Middle of the Air is based on Psalm 23. Catholic nun Sister Janet Mead achieved significant mainstream chart success. New South Wales Supreme Court Judge George Palmer was commissioned to compose the setting of the Mass for Sydney's World Youth Day 2008 Papal Mass. The Mass, Benedictus Qui Venit, for large choir, soloists and orchestra, was performed in the presence of Pope Benedict XVI and an audience of 350,000 with singing led by soprano Amelia Farrugia and tenor Andrew Goodwin. "Receive the Power", a song written by Guy Sebastian and Gary Pinto, was chosen as the official anthem for the XXIII World Youth Day (WYD08) held in Sydney in 2008.

Australian Christmas carols like the Three Drovers or Christmas Day by John Wheeler and William G. James place the Christmas story in an Australian context of warm, dry Christmas winds and red dust and are popular at Catholic services. As the festival of Christmas falls during the Australian summer, Australians gather in large numbers for traditional open-air evening carol services and concerts in December, such as Carols by Candlelight in Melbourne and Carols in the Domain in Sydney.

=== Art ===
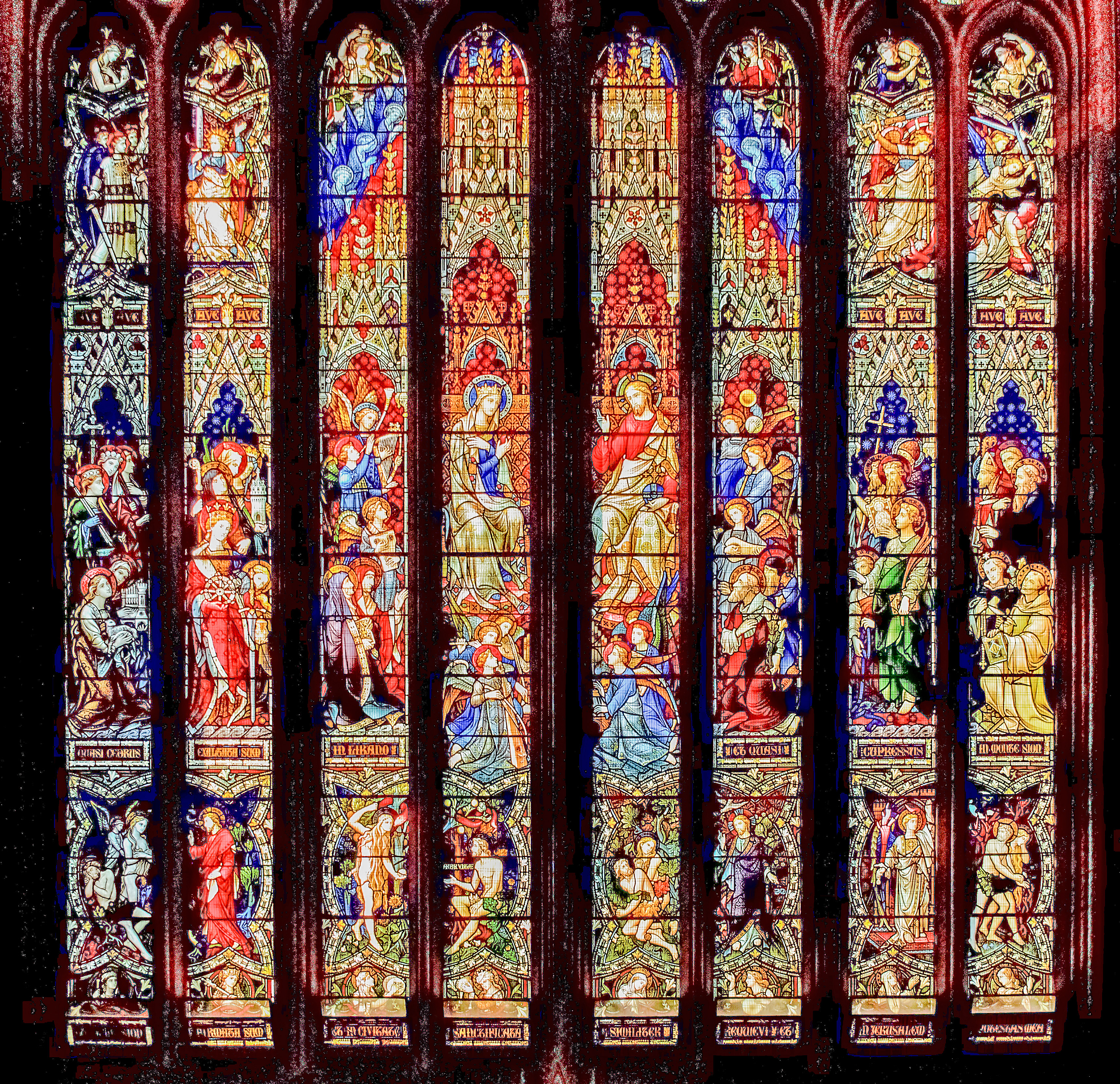
The chancel window of St Mary's Cathedral, Sydney depicts a vision of Christ and the Blessed Virgin Mary enthroned in Heaven.

The story of Christian art in Australia began with the arrival of the first British settlers at the end of the 18th century. During the 19th century, Gothic Revival cathedrals were built in the colonial capitals, often containing stained glass art works, as can be seen at St Mary's Cathedral, Sydney, and St Patrick's Cathedral, Melbourne. Roy de Maistre (1894–1968) was an Australian abstract artist who obtained renown in Britain, converted to Catholicism and painted notable religious works, including a series of Stations of the Cross for Westminster Cathedral in London. Among the most acclaimed of Australian painters of Catholic themes was Arthur Boyd. He painted a Biblical series, and created tapestries of the life of St Francis of Assisi. Influenced by both the European masters and the Heidelberg School of Australian landscape art, he placed the central characters of the Bible within Australian bush scenery, as in his portrait of Adam and Eve, The Expulsion (1948). The artist Leonard French, who designed a stained glass ceiling of the National Gallery of Victoria, has drawn heavily on Christian story and symbolism through his career.

== Saints and other venerated Australians ==
Some of the Australians honoured by the Catholic Church to be saints or whose cause for canonisation is still being investigated include:

=== Saints ===
- Mary MacKillop, founder of the Sisters of St Joseph of the Sacred Heart of Jesus
  - Declared Venerable: 13 June 1992
  - Beatified: 19 January 1995
  - Canonised: 17 October 2010

=== Venerables ===
- Mary Glowrey (Mary of the Sacred Heart), a professed religious of the Society of Jesus Mary Joseph
  - Declared Venerable: 21 November 2025

=== Servants of God ===
- Caroline Chisholm, a married laywoman of the Archdiocese of Canberra-Goulburn
- Eileen Rosaline O'Connor, a laywoman of the Archdiocese of Sydney and founder of the Society of Our Lady's Nurses for the Poor
- Constance Helen Gladman (Mary Rosina), a professed religious of the Daughters of Our Lady of the Sacred Heart

=== Other open causes ===
- Ellen Whitty, a professed religious of the Sisters of Mercy
- Irene McCormack, a professed religious of the Sisters of St Joseph of the Sacred Heart

=== Visits of saints' relics ===
Australia has hosted the major relics of a number saints:

- Peter Chanel, protomartyr of the South Seas (4 May 1849 to 1 February 1850)
- Therese of Lisieux (2002), and together with her parents Louis Martin and Marie-Azélie Guérin (2020)
- Margaret Mary Alacoque (2005)
- Pier Giorgio Frassati for the Sydney World Youth Day (2008)
- Francis Xavier (2013)

=== Visits by saints during their lifetime ===
- Teresa of Calcutta (1969, 1981)
- Pope Paul VI (1970)
- Pope John Paul II (1986, 1995)

== Organisation ==
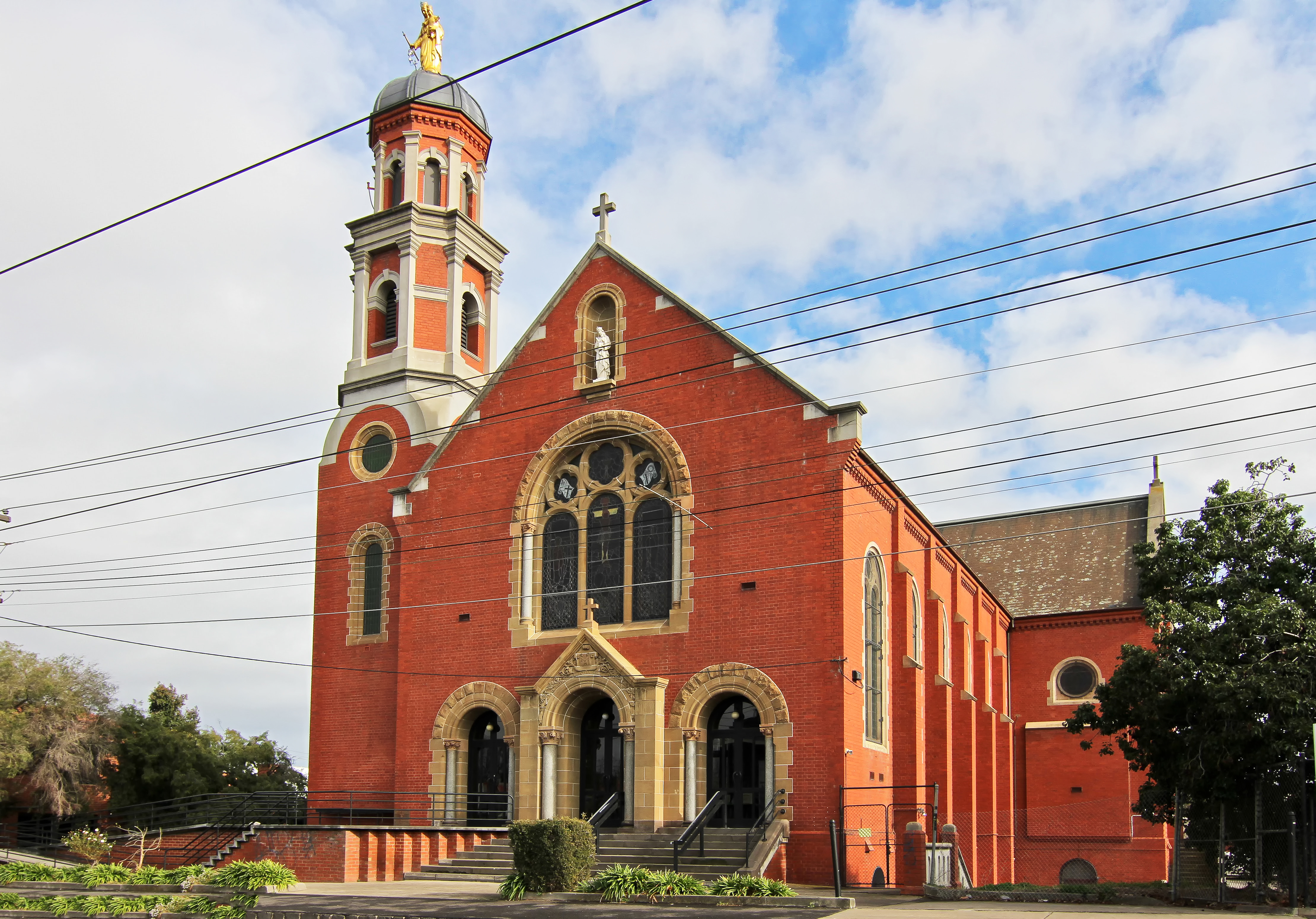
Our Lady Help of Christians Catholic Church in Brunswick East is part of the Melbourne archdiocese

Within Australia the church hierarchy is made of metropolitan archdioceses and suffragan sees. Each diocese has a bishop, while each archdiocese is served by an archbishop. Australia had no living members of the College of Cardinals from the death on 10 January 2023 of the previous Archbishop of Sydney, George Pell, until the elevation on 7 December 2024 of Mykola Bychok to the College of Cardinals. The national assembly of bishops is the Australian Catholic Bishops Conference (ACBC), headed by Timothy Costelloe SDB, the Archbishop of Perth. There are a further 175 autonomous Catholic religious orders operating in Australia, generally affiliated under Catholic Religious Australia, headed by Sr Monica Cavanagh RSJ.

The church in Australia has five provinces: Adelaide, Brisbane, Melbourne, Perth and Sydney. There are seven archdioceses: Adelaide, Brisbane, Canberra and Goulburn, Hobart, Melbourne and Perth. There are 35 dioceses, comprising geographic areas as well as the Australian Defence Force and dioceses for the Chaldean, Maronite, Melkite and Ukrainian rites. There is also a personal ordinariate, principally for former Anglicans, which has a similar status to a diocese. There is also the Australian vicariate of the international personal prelature of the holy cross and opus dei. Rev Paul Hayward, a member of the canon law society of Great Britain and Ireland published in 2013 a helpful article expanding on the theme of territorial and personal jurisdictions. In May 2024, Pope Francis published a short letter to parish priests throughout the world offering three suggestions, the first beginning; "I ask you first to live out your specific ministerial charism in ever greater service to the varied gifts that the Spirit sows in the People of God. It is urgent to discover with faith, the many and varied charismatic gifts of the laity, be they of a humble or more exalted form..." In 2017, there were an estimated 3,000 priests and 9,000 men and women in institutes of consecrated life and societies of apostolic life.

=== Australian Catholic Bishops Conference ===
The Australian Catholic Bishops Conference is the national body of the bishops of Australia. The Conference is headed by Perth Archbishop, Timothy Costelloe SDB. It is served by a secretariat, based in Canberra, under the management of the Reverend Brian Lucas. The conference meets at least annually. (Note: A list of Australian prelates by name can be found at gcatholic.org.)

=== Archdioceses and dioceses ===
- Archdiocese of Adelaide
  - Diocese of Darwin
  - Diocese of Port Pirie
- Archdiocese of Brisbane
  - Diocese of Cairns
  - Diocese of Rockhampton
  - Diocese of Toowoomba
  - Diocese of Townsville
- Archdiocese of Melbourne
  - Diocese of Ballarat
  - Diocese of Sale
  - Diocese of Sandhurst
  - Ukrainian Eparchy of Ss Peter and Paul
- Archdiocese of Perth
  - Diocese of Broome
  - Diocese of Bunbury
  - Diocese of Geraldton
- Archdiocese of Sydney
  - Diocese of Armidale
  - Diocese of Bathurst
  - Diocese of Broken Bay
  - Diocese of Lismore
  - Diocese of Maitland-Newcastle
  - Diocese of Parramatta
  - Diocese of Wagga Wagga
  - Diocese of Wilcannia-Forbes
  - Diocese of Wollongong
- Immediately subject to the Holy See:
  - Archdiocese of Canberra and Goulburn (attached to the Province of Sydney)
  - Archdiocese of Hobart (attached to the Province of Melbourne)
  - Catholic Diocese of the Australian Defence Force (attached to Sydney)
  - Chaldean Eparchy of Saint Thomas the Apostle (attached to Sydney)
  - Maronite Diocese of St Maroun (attached to Sydney)
  - Melkite Eparchy of St Michael, Archangel (attached to Sydney)
  - Personal Ordinariate of Our Lady of the Southern Cross
  - St Thomas the Apostle Syro-Malabar Catholic Eparchy of Melbourne

=== Catholic Religious Australia ===
Australia's autonomous Catholic religious orders are affiliated under Catholic Religious Australia (CRA), which is the public name of the Australian Conference of Leaders of Religious Institutes (ACLRI). This is the peak body for leaders of the religious institutes and societies of apostolic life resident in Australia. It represents more than 130 congregations of sisters, brothers and priests. It is established by the authority of the Holy See in Rome and is tasked with promoting, supporting and representing religious life in the Australian church and in the wider community and with facilitating co-ordination and co-operation of religious with church bodies and with other authorities including with episcopal conferences and with individual bishops. The organisation is presently led by Josephite Sister Monica Cavanagh.

== See also ==
- Catholic Church by country
- Broken Rites and Catholic sexual abuse scandal in Australia
- Christianity in Australia
- List of Catholic cathedrals in Australia
- List of Catholic dioceses in Australia
- List of saints from Oceania
- Religion in Australia
- Category:Catholic Church in South America
