= Catholic Health Australia =

Health services company

Catholic Health Australia represents 75 hospitals and 550 residential and community aged care services and comprises Australia's largest non-government not-for-profit grouping of health and aged care services. Catholic Health Australia was established by the Catholic Church in Australia as the representative body of these health and aged care services.

It is the largest grouping of non-government health, aged and community care services in Australia and according to Catholic Health Australia, one in every ten Australians being cared for in hospitals or residing in aged care facilities are in Catholic health care institutions. Catholic Health Australia says its foundational principles are to service such interests as advocacy and policy development for the "Dignity of the Human Person"; "Service"; the "Common Good"; and "Preference for the Poor and Under-Served".

The group also advocates on behalf of its members to the Australian Governments on health- and aged care-related issues.

== See also ==
- Catholic Social Services Australia
- Health care in Australia
- Catholic Church and health care
- History of public health in Australia

== Further reading. ==
- Arbuckle, Gerald A. "Have Catholic healthcare ministries a future?." Australasian Catholic Record 101.4 (2024): 428-446.
- Austin, Rodger J. "The ministry of Catholic healthcare: a Church Law reflection on its future." Australasian Catholic Record, 73.2 (1996): 162-172.
- Belcher, Helen Maria. "Resisting the Welfare State: An examination of the response of the Australian Catholic Church to the national health schemes of the 1940s and 1970s." (PhD Dissertation University of Sydney, 2004). Outline.
- Gleeson, Damian John. The professionalisation of Australian catholic social welfare, 1920-1985 (Dissertation, UNSW Sydney, 2006) online.
- Ryan, John Joseph. "Strategy transformation and change: changing paradigms in Australian Catholic health and aged care." (Diss. Curtin University, 2001) online.
- Turner, Rosemary. "Catholic health care and aged care in Australia." Australasian Catholic Record 73.2 (1996): 136-145.
