= Monica Cavanagh =

Australian nun

Monica Cavanagh RSJ is an Australian religious sister. She is the congregational leader of the Sisters of St Joseph of the Sacred Heart (Josephites) and was formerly (from 2018) president of Catholic Religious Australia, the peak body for Catholic religious orders in Australia.

== See also ==
- Mary Mackillop
- Catholic Church in Australia
