= Catholic Social Services Australia =

Catholic Social Services Australia (CSSA) is a body that seeks to advance the social service ministry of the Catholic Church and consists of member welfare organisations. It was established as a commission of the Australian Catholic Bishops Conference until it underwent consolidation in 2020.

The incumbent Executive Director, appointed in July 2021, is Monique Earsman.

It succeeds earlier bodies such as the Catholic Welfare Bureau.

Catholic Social Services Australia has 54 member organisations in metropolitan, regional and remote Australia. Members include diocesan based Centacare and CatholicCare agencies and those under the stewardship of religious orders.

CSSA defines it objects as: "Catholic Social Services carries out its Mission by interacting with Catholic organisations, governments, other churches and all people of goodwill, to develop social services policies, programs and other strategic responses that enhance the human dignity of every person and work towards the economic, social and spiritual well-being of the Australian community."

The body seeks to influence Australian governments and the community on welfare issues and is a co-sponsor of the Dropping Off the Edge Report (DOTE) mapping disadvantage in Australia.

== See also ==
- Catholic education in Australia
- Catholic Health Australia
- Christianity in Australia
