= Constance Helen Gladman =

Australian nun (1922–1964)

Constance Helen Gladman (23 December 1922 – 30 November 1964), also known as Sr. Mary Rosina, was a religious sister of the Daughters of Our Lady of the Sacred Heart.

== Life ==
She was born in Koroit, Victoria the oldest of seven children, raised in Warrong and educated in Warrnambool and Melbourne.

She died in Kokopo (near Rabaul), on the island of New Britain, Papua New Guinea. Sister Rosina was beheaded in her classroom while working as a teaching nun among impoverished communities. Her cause for beatification as a martyr is currently under investigation.
