= O'Leary =

Irish surname

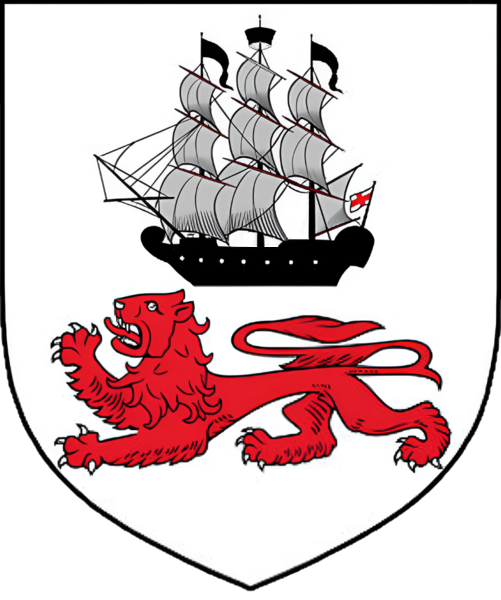
O'Leary Coat of Arms: Argent, a lion passant in base gules, in chief a ship of three masts sable sails set proper, from the stern the flag of St. George flotant.

O'Leary is an Irish surname derived from the Gaelic Ó Laoghaire (also Ó Laoire), meaning "descendant of Laoghaire"—a personal name often interpreted as "keeper of the calves" or "calf herder." The name is historically associated with a prominent family lineage in County Cork, Ireland, where the O'Learys were chieftains in the ancient kingdom of Munster. Over time, individuals bearing the O'Leary surname have become notable in various fields such as politics, military service, literature, and religion, both in Ireland and abroad.

== History ==
=== Ancient ===
The Uí Laoghaire clan, today associated with the Uibh Laoghaire parish in County Cork, is considered by scholars to have originated in the early Middle Ages on the south-west coast, in the area of Ros Ó gCairbre (Rosscarbery), of which the O'Leary were hereditary lords.

Carrignacurra Castle, Inchigeelagh, Co. Cork, Ireland.

The Annals of Innisfallen (Dublin copy) records St. Fachtna's (Saint Fachanan) death in 600 AD as occurring in "O'Laeghaire of Ross i.e. Corca Laidhe-I-Laeghaire Ruis". The clan traces its lineage to Lugaid Mac Con, an ancient King of Tara and High King of Ireland, and descendant of Dáire Doimthech. In the 12th century the O'Leary's were recognised hereditary wardens of St Fachtna's monastery and seat of higher learning, the School of Ross. In more recent times (since 1300 AD), the clan, of the Corcu Loígde, was pushed north and settled in an area west of Macroom around Inchigeelagh called Uibh Laoghaire (or Uibh Laoire in modern Irish – the 'gh' is silent in the old Irish). Their presence in the area is marked by a four story stone tower house called Carrignacurra Castle, which was built on a rocky outcrop on the south bank of the River Lee in the late 16th century, a mile east of Inchigeelagh.

The Corcu Loígde were the rulers of Munster, and of territories beyond the province, before the rise of the Eóganachta in the 7th century. According to historian C. Thomas Cairney, the O'Learys were one of the chiefly families of the Corca Laoghdne tribe who in turn came from the Erainn tribe who were the second wave of Celts to settle in Ireland from 500 to 100 BC. The port of Dún Laoghaire, near Dublin is not associated with the O'Leary sept(s), rather it is named for Lóegaire mac Néill, a 5th-century High King of Ireland.

The book of Lecan (A.D. 1397-A.D. 1418) details the early status of O'Leary as a Corco Laide taisach duchusa (hereditary chieftain) in the tuath of Ross (Ruis), with associated families:

Tuath Ruis .i. Tuath in Dolaich, o Loch in Bricin co Faid Ruis -, o Thraig Long co Sid na Fear (i) Find. O Leagaire a taisach duchusa. Is iad so an oclaid duchusa .i. O Ruaidri -, O Lonan -, O Laidid -, O Torpa -, O hUrmoltaich -, O Mirin -, O Meic Dairic -, O Tuaraide -, O Trena -, O hUainidi -, O Cerdin

The name also occurs in the Cineal Laoghaire branch of the Eoghanacht dynasty which later came to dominate Munster. With the unrelated Corco Laidhe and Eoghanacht branches of O'Learys settling in north-west Cork and nearby Kerry respectively, the tracing of lineage is complex.

=== Modern ===
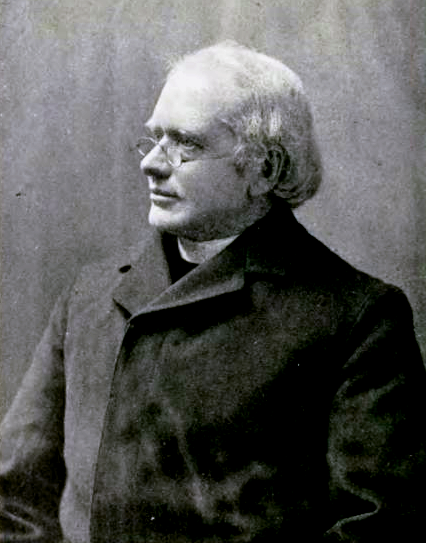
Peadar Ua Laoghaire, one of the founders of modern literature in Irish.

Although almost nothing is known of their activities for several centuries, the O'Learys reappear as a still titled family in the 16th century, and relatively wealthy, although they were subject to the MacCarthy of Muskerry dynasty, from whom they received the White Wand (a symbol of authority). They were the only other freeholders in Muskerry besides the O'Mahonys, and had built several castles in their territories, including Carraignaneelagh, Drumcarragh and Carrignacurra, of which Carrignacurra is the only one still standing. The celebrated Irish language writer Peadar Ua Laoghaire was a descendant of the Carrignacurra branch of the family.

Auliffe O'Leary joined the side of Hugh Ó Neill, 2nd Earl of Tyrone in the Nine Years' War, from the very inception of it, and took the field with William Bourke (Clanricarde) and others. For this the chiefs of the O'Learys were eventually attained, and their lands parceled out, but because of the remoteness of their territory it was never carried out, and they remained safe there until the Cromwellian confiscations decades later. Donough MacCarty, 1st Earl of Clancarty did however appear to do his best to allow them to stay on their lands through leasing. The family became much more scattered during the later Williamite War in Ireland.

As an example of their wealth and capacity in the mid-16th century, an early O'Leary of Carrignacurra is purported to be the fosterer of Donnel na g croiceann, or Donnel of the Hides, ancestor of the modern O'Donovans of Clan Cahaill. His daughter Ellen married Donnell. Their issue was Donnell II O'Donovan.

The last O'Leary lord of the Old Gaelic order was Donal MacArt O'Leary (1575–1657).

== People ==
=== Military ===
- Art Ó Laoghaire (d 1773), Austro-Hungarian army officer
  - His wife Eibhlín Dubh Ní Chonaill, composed "Caoineadh Airt Uí Laoghaire"
- Daniel Florencio O'Leary (1802–1854), military general under Simon Bolivar
- Michael John O'Leary (1890–1961), Irish-Canadian recipient of the Victoria Cross
- William O'Leary (British Army officer), Deputy Commander Field Army (British Army)

Bernard F O’Leary (British Army)

Donald B O’Leary (British Army)

=== Religion ===
- Arthur O'Leary (preacher) (1729–1802), Irish Franciscan and polemical writer
- Francis O'Leary MBE (1931–2000), founded the St Joseph's Hospice Association
- Henry Joseph O'Leary (1879–1938), Bishop of Charlottetown and Archbishop of Edmonton
- Louis James O'Leary (1877–1930), 6th Bishop of the Roman Catholic Diocese of Charlottetown

=== Poetry and literature ===
- John O'Leary (Fenian) (1830–1907), Irish poet who was imprisoned in England
- Máire Bhuí Ní Laoghaire (1774–1849), Irish poet
- Peadar Ua Laoghaire (1839–1920), Irish writer in Irish and Catholic priest
- P. I. O'Leary (1888–1944), Australian poet and journalist

=== Politics and law ===
- Brendan O'Leary, Irish political scientist
- Clement O'Leary, Canadian member of Parliament
- Cornelius O'Leary, Irish historian and political scientist
- Denis O'Leary (1863–1943), New York politician
- Donnchadh Ó Laoghaire (born 1989) Teachta Dála for Sinn Féin
- Grattan O'Leary (1888–1976), Canadian journalist and Senator
- Harriet Wright O'Leary (1916-1999), American teacher and politician and first woman to serve on the tribal council of the Choctaw Nation of Oklahoma
- Hazel R. O'Leary (born 1937), former United States Secretary of Energy
- Henry O'Leary, Irish-born businessman and political figure in New Brunswick
- Hugh O'Leary (born 1974), English accountant and husband of Liz Truss
- Humphrey O'Leary (1886–1953), 7th Chief Justice of New Zealand
- James A. O'Leary, member of the United States House of Representatives from New York
- Jean O'Leary, American gay and lesbian rights activist, politician, and former nun
- John O'Leary (ambassador) (1947–2005), mayor of Portland, Maine, and United States ambassador to Chile
- John O'Leary (Fenian) (1830–1907), Irish separatist
- John O'Leary (Kerry politician) (1933–2015), former Irish Fianna Fáil party politician and TD for Kerry South
- John O'Leary (Wexford politician) (1894–1959), former Irish Labour party politician and TD for Wexford
- Joseph V. O'Leary, NYS Comptroller 1941–1942 and founding member of the Liberal Party of New York
- Kevin O'Leary (judge) (1920–2015), 2nd Chief Justice of the Supreme Court of the Northern Territory
- Michael O'Leary (politician) (1936–2006), former leader of the Irish Labour Party
- Richard O'Leary, American politician
- Seán O'Leary (Irish politician) (1941–2006), former Irish senator
- Sheilagh O'Leary, Canadian politician
- William O'Leary (Irish politician) (died 1955), Irish Fianna Fáil politician and TD for Kerry

=== Journalism and activism ===
- Émile-Dostaler O'Leary (1908–1965), Canadian journalist and writer
- Grattan O'Leary (1888–1976), Canadian journalist and Senator
- Jeremiah O'Leary, American journalist
- John O'Leary (journalist), editor of the Times Higher Education Supplement
- Olivia O'Leary, Irish journalist
- P. I. O'Leary (1888–1944), Australian poet and journalist.
- Walter-Patrice O'Leary (1910–1989), Canadian journalist, political activist and trade unionist

=== Arts and entertainment ===
- Arthur O'Leary (composer) (1834–1919), Irish composer and pianist
- Dermot O'Leary (born 1973), English television and radio presenter
- Fletcher O'Leary, Australian child actor
- Jane O'Leary (born 1946), American-Irish avantgarde composer
- Karen O'Leary New Zealand comedian and television and film actress
- Mary O'Leary (producer), American television producer
- Matt O'Leary, American actor
- Michael O'Leary (actor) (born 1958), in American soap opera Guiding Light
- Patrick O'Leary (writer) (born 1952), American science fiction writer
- Tim O'Leary, fictional character in the British soap opera Brookside
- Ursula O'Leary, English actress
- William O'Leary (actor), American actor

=== Sport ===
- Amanda O'Leary, American lacrosse coach
- Bob O'Leary, American soccer player
- Charley O'Leary (1882–1941), American baseball player
- Clare O'Leary, first Irish woman to climb Mount Everest
- Clare O'Leary (cricketer)
- Dan O'Leary, American baseball player
- Daren O'Leary, English rugby union player
- David O'Leary, English-born Irish football (soccer) manager formerly of Aston Villa
- George O'Leary (born 1946), American college football coach
- John O'Leary (Gaelic footballer)
- Kieran O'Leary, Irish Gaelic footballer
- Kristian O'Leary, Welsh football (soccer) player
- Mike O'Leary, American curler
- Noel O'Leary, Irish footballer
- Peter O'Leary (referee), New Zealand football (soccer) referee
- Pierce O'Leary, Irish footballer
- Pierce O'Leary (boxer) (born 2000), Irish boxer
- Ryan O'Leary, Scottish footballer
- Seánie O'Leary (1952–2021), Irish hurler
- Stephen O'Leary, English-born Irish footballer
- Tomás O'Leary (born 1983), Irish rugby union player
- Troy O'Leary (born 1969), American baseball player

=== Other ===
- Brian O'Leary, American "scientist-astronaut"
- Catherine O'Leary (1827–1895), owner of the property in which it was alleged the Great Chicago Fire started
- Ciarán O'Leary, Irish professional poker player practicing in the USA
- Daniel O'Leary (mobster), Irish American mobster
- James Patrick O'Leary (c. 1860–1926), American mobster
- Kevin O'Leary (entrepreneur), Canadian entrepreneur and venture capitalist
- Michael O'Leary (businessman), CEO of the low-cost Irish airline Ryanair
- Seán Ó Laoire, (1946–2026) Irish architect and urban designer

== Places ==
- Uibh Laoghaire, parish around Inchigeelagh, in County Cork, Ireland.
- Dún Laoghaire, Dublin, Ireland – Name means "Fort of Leary".
- O'Leary, Prince Edward Island
- Plaza O’Leary – major square in Caracas, Venezuela. Named for Daniel Florencio O'Leary

== See also ==
- Leary (disambiguation)
- Irish clans
