= The Tribune (Melbourne) =

Catholic newspaper in Australia

- Type: Weekly newspaper
- Format: Broadsheet
- Publisher: William Ponsonby McMahon
- Editor: W. B. Mangan; Thomas W. Brennan (sub-editor and poet); Thomas J. Moore
- General manager: J. J. Collins
- Staff writers: J. A. Alexander; G. M. Jackson; Bessie Marren
- Managing director: W. B. Mangan
- Founded: January 13, 1900
- Ceased publication: March 25, 1971
- Language: English
- City: Melbourne, Victoria
- Country: Australia
- ISSN: 2203-3998 (print); 2203-4005 (web)
- Website: trove.nla.gov.au/newspaper/title/793

The Tribune was a newspaper first published in Melbourne, Australia in 1900 for the Roman Catholic Church.

== History ==
1853

A newspaper Catholic Tribune was published in Melbourne by bookseller James Shanley (died March 1857) from 2 July 1853, and may have ceased with the advent of the Advocate on 1 February 1868.

1870

In November 1870 The Tribune was founded in Melbourne by William Ponsonby McMahon aimed at a liberal–labour Catholic readership, but failed to thrive. He then found employment working for the Melbourne Argus.

1900

In 1900 The Tribune subtitled "A Journal of Information and Literature" was founded, with McMahon its publisher and editor. (Trove only has copies from No. 730 Vol. XIII of 3 January 1914 to No. 989 Vol. XVII of 26 December 1918). McMahon resigned in January 1920 to take up a less demanding post as organising secretary to the Victorian Catholic Federation.

Sufficient references have been found to the Tribune in the intervening years to be assured of its continued existence to 1963, in which year Michael Costigan served as its representative at the Second Vatican Council in Rome.

The Tribune was printed at The Advocate Press.

=== Some personnel ===
- Father W. B. Mangan was editor and managing director 1913–1924 He was chaplain of the First AIF during WWI.
- J. A. Alexander was editor 1922 Alexander became political correspondent for the Herald.
- Thomas J. Moore was editor before leaving to found The New Times c. 1934
- Denys G. M. Jackson was editor 1936–1944 or later.
- Thomas W. Brennan was sub-editor and poet, became lawyer
- J. J. Collins was appointed manager in 1922
- Father Francis Moynihan was associate editor from February 1924 to February 1925
- J. J. McLean, news editor 1947
- Bessie Marren, "Cecilia" of the Women's Page She later married Arthur Calwell.
- Harrison Owen, London correspondent
- Frank Kelly, previously with the Geelong Advertiser was journalist when McMahon was editor and offices were in Wardrop Buildings, Elizabeth Street.
- Offices were in Errol Place, North Melbourne in 1923

== Other Tribune newspapers in Melbourne ==
There have been other, unconnected and probably secular, Tribunes in Victoria:

- The Evening Tribune, first issue 30 March 1874, was founded by ex-employees of Mason & Firth's printery, sacked for taking part in a strike. It was taken over by a consortium in October 1874 and vanished without trace.
- The Port Melbourne Tribune first appeared in April 1889 and William Howe became manager around 1890. It was absorbed by The Port Melbourne Standard in 1894.
