= Patrick O'Leary =

Patrick O'Leary may refer to:

- Patrick O'Leary (canoeist), who became the first Irish Paralympic athlete to qualify for the final of the KL3 canoeing at the 2016 Summer Paralympics
- Pat O'Leary, rugby league footballer of the 1940s and 1950s
- Patrick O'Leary (writer) (born 1952), science fiction author
- Patrick Albert O'Leary, the wartime alias of Belgian Resistance member Albert Guérisse
- Patrick O'Leary, husband to Catherine O'Leary of the Great Chicago Fire
- Patrick I. O'Leary (1888–1944), Australian poet and journalist
