= Jean-Louis Gagnon =

Canadian journalist (1913–2004)

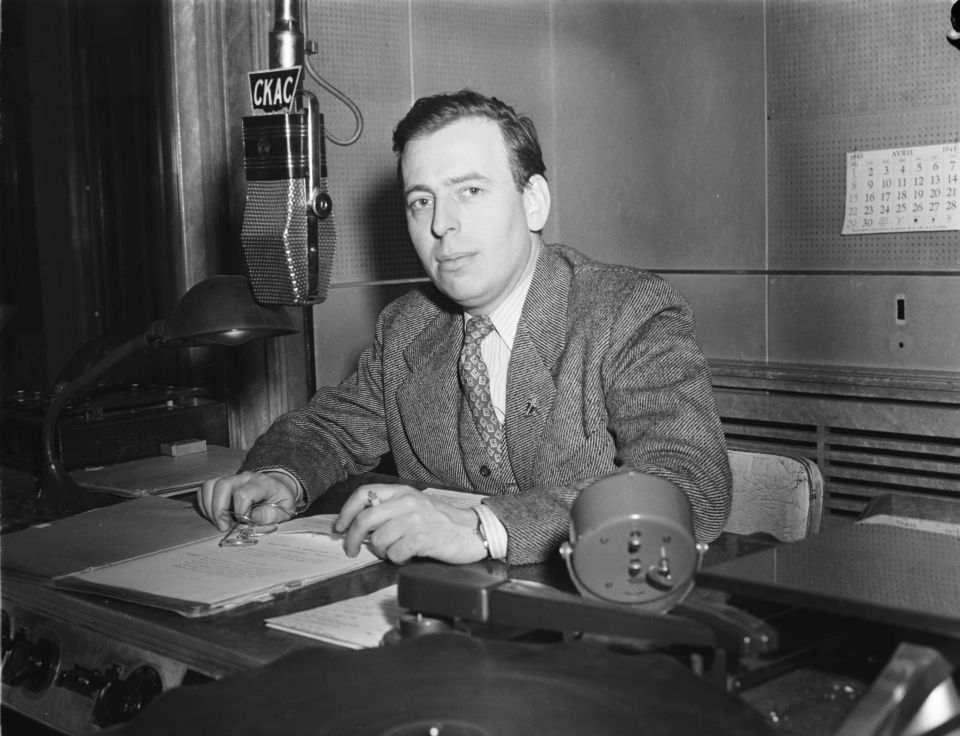

Jean-Louis Gagnon, OC, CQ, FRSC (February 21, 1913 – May 26, 2004) was a Canadian journalist, writer, and public servant. He was a member of the Royal Commission on Bilingualism and Biculturalism and, following the death of André Laurendeau, its co-president.

Gagnon was appointed Director General of Information Canada in 1970, served as Ambassador and Permanent Delegate of Canada to UNESCO from 1972 to 1976, and member of the Canadian Radio-television and Telecommunications Commission from 1976 to 1983.
