= Leacy =

Leacy is a toponymic surname derived from Lassy, Calvados. Notable people with the surname include:

- Mary Leacy (born 1987), Irish camogie player
- Una Leacy (born 1988), Irish camogie player
- Margaret O'Leary-Leacy

== See also ==
- Lacy
- Leary (surname)
