= Heary =

The name Ó hÍoruaidh is an Anglicized form of a Gaelic personal name, Íoruadh, with unclear etymology. Heary is a surname most commonly found in England, Ireland, and the United States. Notable people with the surname include:

- Owen Heary (born 1976), Irish footballer
- Thomas Heary (born 1979), Irish footballer

== Related Surnames ==
Leary (surname)
