= Leary =

Leary may refer to:

== People ==
- King Leary or Lóegaire mac Néill, an Irish king
- Leary (surname)

== Places ==
- Leary, Georgia, U.S.
- Leary, Texas, U.S.

== Other uses ==
- Leary v. United States, a 1969 U.S. Supreme Court case
- Lt. Leary series, a science fiction novel series by David Drake
- USS Leary, three ships of the United States Navy

== See also ==
- O'Leary
- Lóegaire, an Irish anglicized to Leary
