= Paul Wyczynski =

Canadian academic (1921–2008)

Paul Wyczynski, OC, FRSC (June 29, 1921 – November 27, 2008) was a Polish-born Canadian literature scholar who pioneered the study of French Canadian literature. A specialist of the work of Émile Nelligan, he spent his academic career at the University of Ottawa, where he founded the Centre de Recherche en Civilisation Canadienne-Française.

He was a member of the Royal Commission on Bilingualism and Biculturalism.
