= Gertrude M. Laing =

<100>Canadian academic and activist

Gertrude M. Laing, OC (1905-2005) was a Canadian academic and activist. She served as the only woman on the Royal Commission on Bilingualism and Biculturalism Commission.

== Biography ==
Laing was born in Royal Tunbridge Wells, Kent and grew up in Winnipeg. Laing truly enjoyed French, saying, "It was love at first sight. The first time I had a French lesson, I felt that was it and it was." She read French from the University of Manitoba. Laing was given "the first French government bursary ever awarded to a student at the University of Manitoba" and went to study in Le Sorbonne, France. After her return, she became a French teacher at the University of Manitoba. She was head of the local YWCA and various councils, and served on several community boards such as the Canadian Radio and Television Commission. She was also a UNESCO General Assembly delegate.

Laing was part of the Royal Commission on Bilingualism and Biculturalism Commission, set up in 1963. She was the only woman on the commission. In 1972, she was inducted into the Order of Canada for her community work. From 1975 to 1978, Laing was Chair of the Canada Council. She was awarded honorary degrees from the University of Manitoba, University of Calgary, University of British Columbia (Doctor of Laws) and University of Ottawa, as well as receiving the Queen Elizabeth II Silver Jubilee Medal and Queen Elizabeth II Golden Jubilee Medal in 1977 and 2002 respectively.

She died in Calgary, Alberta on 18 December 2005.
