= Samuel Vincent Winter =

Australian politician

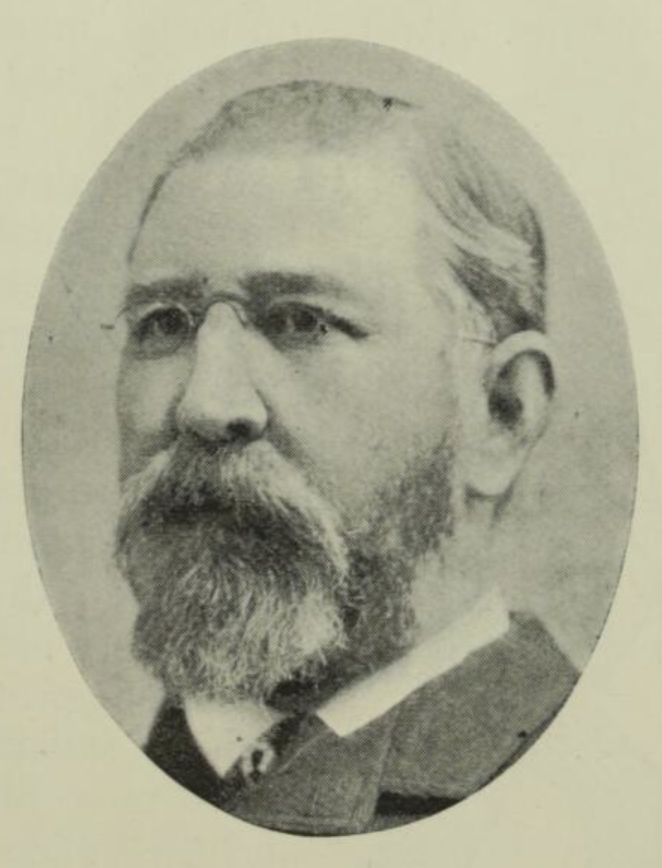
Samuel Vincent Winter

Samuel Vincent "Stormy" Winter (23 March 1843 – 16 October 1904) was a newspaper proprietor and editor in the colony of Victoria, Australia. He served two terms as mayor of Richmond, Victoria, in the second instance being distinguished as the first mayor of the City of Richmond.

== History ==
Samuel was born in the Goulburn district in 1843, eldest son of Samuel Winter (1786–1861)and Alice "Ally" Winter, née O'Sullivan (1818 – 11 January 1905); his parents shortly afterwards moved to Clifton Street, Richmond. He was a bright student, but was forced at age 13 by the death of his father in 1857 to leave school. He was apprenticed as a compositor to printer W. H. Williams. In 1868 with assistance from Sir Charles Gavan Duffy, the Very Rev. J. Dalton, S.J., the Rev. G. V. Barry, and Hon. Michael O'Grady, he founded The Advocate, a newspaper oriented towards the Irish Catholic community, and of which he was manager and editor for several years, when he handed it over to his brother Joseph. He then led a consortium to purchase The Herald (Melbourne), which had fallen on hard times, and became its business manager, then also editor in 1874. In 1881 he founded The Sportsman, which he sold in 1893 In 1891 The Weekly Times was incorporated into The Herald, and in 1894 the company took over the Evening Standard. At the time of his death he was general manager of the Herald and Weekly Times Newspaper Company, and editor-in-chief of the company's publications.

=== Politics ===
In 1875, he was elected a councillor of Richmond, and was at the forefront in introducing the city's tramways system. In 1877 he was elected Mayor of the municipality, and again in 1881, shortly before Richmond became a city on 17 February 1882. He laid the foundation stones of the South Richmond Free Library in 1877 and of the Swan Street east bridge over the Yarra River in 1881.

He was in 1877 and again in 1883 a candidate for the Legislative Assembly seat of Richmond, but was not elected.

He lived most of his adult life at Church Street, Richmond, led a very private life in his last years, and died at his residence, Walsh-street, South Yarra, after a very short illness, and had a private funeral.

== Other interests ==
- Samuel was a founding member of the Australian Natives' Association.
- He was Secretary of St. Patrick's Society for seven years, relinquishing the post when he took up the Herald, and was subsequently elected president.

== Family ==
Samuel's brother Joseph Winter (26 October 1844 – 2 December 1915) took over management and editorship of The Advocate around 1870. Another brother John Winter ( – ) was in the Public Service. Youngest brother James Winter ( – ) married Bridget Comber on 23 September 1872

S. V. Winter married Lucy Helen Stodart (c. 1846 – 6 May 1882) on 14 May 1863. Their children included:

- Samuel Stodart Winter (1867 – 15 January 1933?) married Ellen Barry (1866–1913) in 1889. He married again, to Catherine Brooks in 1915
- Joseph Stodart Winter (c. December 1870 – 1950)
- Lucy Helen Winter ( – ) married James Henry Dodds on 1 August 1899
- John Stodart Winter (c. December 1876 – )

He may have married again, to Miss Scott of Richmond, some time after May 1888.
