= The Record (Perth) =

Newspaper in Western Australia

The W. A. Catholic Record, later The W. A. Record, later simply The Record, was a newspaper published in Perth, Western Australia from September 1874, and was the official organ of the Archdiocese of Perth. The magazine is now published bi-monthly in both paper and electronic formats.

== History ==
The fourth issue of the newspaper appeared early in 1874.

A bi-monthly "eRecord" electronic magazine became free on-line in 2016, and a hard copy and PDF version began publication at the same time.

== Online archive ==
Vol.XV No.412 of Thursday 19 July 1888 to New Series No.2061 of Saturday 28 January 1922 were digitized from photographic copies by the National Library of Australia and can be accessed using Trove.

== Sequence ==
- The W.A. Catholic Record - 1874-1888
- The W.A. Record - 1888 - 1922
  - Dates: Vol. 15, no. 412 (July 19, 1888)-vol. 44, no. 2070 (April 1, 1922)
- The Record - 1922 - 2014

== See also ==
Other Roman Catholic publications in Australia are:

- The Southern Cross (South Australia)
- The Advocate (Melbourne)
- The Catholic Leader (Brisbane)
