= Bread and Cheese Club =

Australian art, literary society and publisher

The Bread and Cheese Club was a Melbourne-based Australian art and literary society and publisher. It was founded in June 1938 with the purpose of fostering “Mateship, Art and Letters”. Its membership was all male. It promoted Australian writers and published about 40 books, as well as a magazine. The person principally involved in founding and running the organisation was book collector J. K. Moir, the club's “Knight Grand Cheese” from its foundation until 1952. Following Moir's death in 1958 the club went into a decline and eventually closed in 1988.

== Publications ==
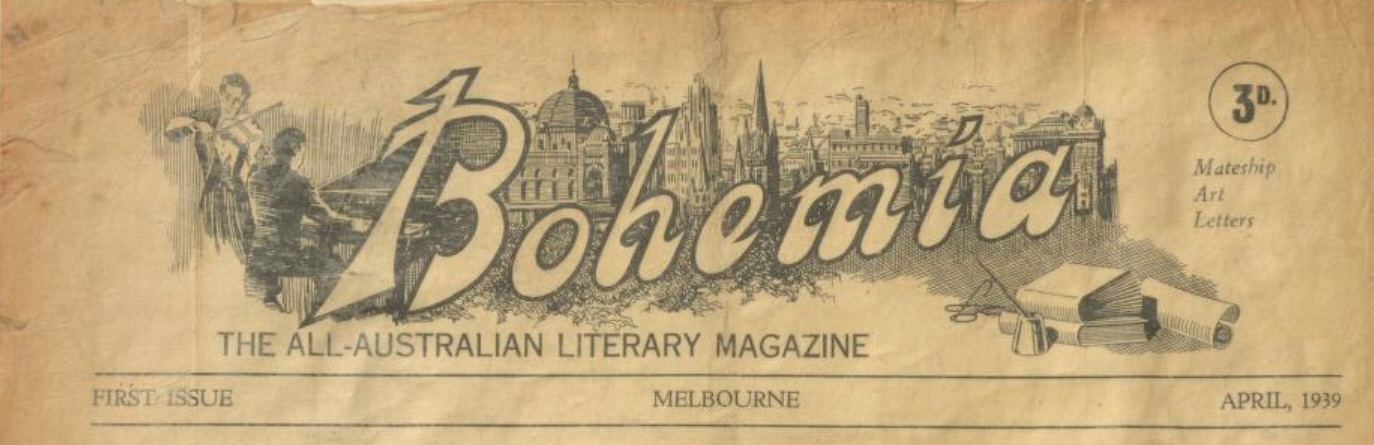
masthead of 1st edition of Bohemia

Bohemia, subtitled "the all-Australian literary magazine", was published from 1939 to 1967. Other publications, mainly of poetry and personal tributes issued in the 1940s, include:

- Allan, J. Alex (1940), Revolution
- Anon. (1940). Catalogue: Australian art and literature exhibition, sponsored by the Bread and Cheese Club
- Anon. (1942), John Shaw Neilson: a memorial
- Anon. (1946), Exhibition by fellows of the Bread and Cheese Club Art Group: at the Myer Gallery, from 2 July until 13 July 1946
- Anon. (1947), An English wreath for Gordon's grave
- Anon. (1955), Miles Franklin: a tribute, by some of her friends
- Archer, A. Lee (1941). Tom Collins (Joseph Furphy) as I knew him
- Barrett, Charles (1942), Art of the Australian Aboriginal
- Brogden, Stanley (1941), Tribute
- Brogden, Stanley (1942), The Australian freelance (Several editions published)
- Challman, Oscar (1967), Tributes in verse
- Cobb, Victor E. (1940), The etched work of Victor Cobb
- Croll, Robert Henderson (1946), An autobituary
- Dalziel, Kathleen (1941), "Known and not held"
- Doorly, Gerald S. (1943), The songs of the "Morning" (Words by John D. Morrison)
- Fleay, David (1947), Gliders of the gum trees: the most beautiful and enchanting Australian marsupials
- Grahame, Jim (1940), Call of the bush
- Gross, Alan (1948), Attainment: being a critical study of the literature of federation: with bibliography
- Lapthorne, Alice M. (1946), Mildura calling (Foreword by Bernard Cronin)
- Law, Marjorie J. (1945), Rain songs
- Malloch, Harry (1940), A brief history of the Bread and Cheese Club
- Malloch, H. W. (ed). (1943), Fellows all: The chronicles of the Bread and Cheese Club
- Malloch, H. W. (1951), Brief character sketch of John Kinmont Moir
- Mawdesley, Christina (1944), The corroboree tree and twelve shorter poems of Melbourne's early days of settlement
- Mountford, C. P. (1951). Art of Albert Namatjira
- O'Leary, Patrick I. (1939), The bread and cheese book: A selection of verses
- Pitts, Judith (1943), Cold hearthstone
- Swan, Robert A. (1946), Argonauts returned, and other poems (Foreword by R. H. Croll)
- Tierney, T. V. (1942), Nerangi Mundowie. (Lines written on viewing etching by Victor Cobb)
- Wannan, William (1943), The corporal's story
- West, Harvey (1945), Belsen
- Wye, W. J. (1941), Bush minstrelsy
