= Jean Martineau (lawyer) =

Jean Martineau, CC QC (ca. 1895 – 11 December 1985) was a Canadian lawyer, judge and President of the Canada Council for the Arts from 1964 to 1969.

Martineau was educated at the Université de Montréal. He was admitted to the Quebec Bar in 1919 and joined a Montreal law firm then known as Chauvin, Walker, that had been founded in 1907 by Henry Noel Chauvin and George Harold Baker. When he joined its senior partners were Henry Chauvin and Harold E. Walker, both of whom were English speaking. He practised with the firm until he was appointed to the Quebec Court of Appeal in 1954. He later rejoined the firm after he left the Court in 1959 and the firm later adopted his name, coming to be known as Martineau Walker.

He became a noted litigator and was made King's Counsel in 1929. He became Président du Bureau des examinateurs en 1952 and from 1953 to 1954, he was Bâtonnier of the Bar of Montreal and Bâtonnier du Barreau du Québec.

From 1954 to 1959, he sat as a judge of the Quebec Court of Appeal. In 1957 he was as a member of the Kellock Commission.

After his return to private practice he served as President of the Advisory Council for the Administration of Justice for the Province of Québec from 1965 to 1968 and as legal counsel to the Royal Commission of Inquiry concerning the administration of justice in Québec in 1968.

He was made President of the Canada Council for the Arts in 1964. In that capacity he gave an address, The Canada Council at Work, on 24 October 1968.

In 1969 on his retirement from the Canada Council, he was made a Companion of the Order of Canada.

== See also ==
- Fasken (Fasken Martineau)
