= Canada Council =

Arts council of the Government of Canada

Canada Council for the Arts

Council overview
- Formed: 1957
- Type: Arts council
- Jurisdiction: Government of Canada
- Headquarters: 150 Elgin Street Ottawa, Ontario
- Council executives: Jesse Wente, Chair; Marie Pier Germain, Vice-Chair; Michelle Chawla, Director and Chief Executive Officer
- Parent department: Department of Canadian Heritage
- Key document: Canada Council for the Arts Act
- Website: canadacouncil.ca

The Canada Council for the Arts (French: Conseil des arts du Canada), commonly called the Canada Council, is a Crown corporation established in 1957 as an arts council of the Government of Canada. It is Canada's public arts funder, with a mandate to foster and promote the study and enjoyment of, and the production of works in, the arts.

The Council's grants, services, initiatives, prizes and payments contribute to the vibrancy of a creative and diverse arts and literary scene and support its presence across Canada and abroad. The Council's investments contribute to fostering greater engagement in the arts among Canadians and international audiences.

In addition, the Canada Council administers the Art Bank, which operates art rental programs and an exhibitions and outreach program. The Canada Council Art Bank holds the largest collection of contemporary Canadian art in the world. The Canada Council is also responsible for the secretariat for the Canadian Commission for UNESCO and the Public Lending Right Commission.

== Organization ==
The Canada Council for the Arts is an arms-length organization based in Ottawa, Ontario, that reports to Parliament through the Minister of Canadian Heritage. Its endowment income is supplemented by annual appropriations from Parliament, donations, and bequests. Its main duty is allotting grants and prizes to Canadian artists based on the merits of their applications. The Canada Council also funds and administers many of Canada's top arts awards, including the Governor General's Literary Awards and the Governor General's Awards in Visual and Media Arts.

The Canada Council is called from time to time to appear before parliamentary committees, particularly the Canadian House of Commons Standing Committee on Canadian Heritage. Its accounts are audited by the Auditor General of Canada and included in an Annual Report to Parliament.

Canada Council for the Arts Act

Parliament of Canada
- Long title: An Act for the establishment of a Canadian council for the encouragement of the arts
- Citation: 1957 Original, 1977 Amendment, 1992 Amendment, Current (2009 Amendment), Killam-Dunn Renaming Attempt
- Enacted by: Parliament of Canada
- Assented to: 1985
- Status: Current legislation

=== History of the Act ===
"In 1977, the Canada Council sets up the Payment for Public Use Committee to discuss the creation of a Public Lending Right (PLR) program. The following year, the federal government created the Social Sciences and Humanities Research Council, adopting responsibility for the humanities and social sciences from the Canada Council, which would now only be responsible for the arts." Starting in 1978, there were attempts to rename the Council to the Killam-Dunn Council, in recognition of contributions to the Council made by Sir Isaac Walton Killam and Sir James Dunn.

The first version of the Canada Council for the Arts Act was titled An Act for the Establishment of a Canada Council for the Encouragement of the Arts, Humanities and Social Sciences. It was assented to on March 28, 1957, by the 22nd federal parliament under Liberal Prime Minister Louis St. Laurent. This version of the Act established a council of 21 members who could serve between three and five years, depending on their role in the Council. The Act also granted them the power to co-operate with organizations who had similar aims (such as universities) in funding and facilitating work in the Arts, Humanities, and Social Sciences across Canada, as well as promoting Canadian work in these fields abroad.

There were several amendments over the years, with most being minor alterations to language or the status of Council members for tax purposes. Two major amendments, passed in the 1970s and later the 1990s, were more significant. In 1976–77, an amendment renamed the Act to simply the Canada Council Act. In conjunction with the establishment of the Social Science and Humanities Research Council, the Act narrowed the Council's mandate exclusively to "the study and enjoyment of, and the production of works in, the arts". While the council's powers as a promoting and sponsoring body remained, all references to social sciences and humanities were removed. In 1992, this was reversed, and duties of the Research Council, as well as promotional activities of the Department of External Affairs, were reabsorbed into the Canada Council. This amendment also reduced the number of mandatory Council meetings to two, and shortened the deadline for the Council to submit its financial audits.

=== The Modern Act ===
The Canada Council for the Arts Act was last amended in 2009. This is the current version as of 2022. Between 2002 and 2009 were a number of small revisions to get to the modern Act that we have today. The majority of the changes to the Canada Council for the Arts Act since 2002 involve updates to language due to evolving definitions. For example, in section 12 of Objects, Powers and Duties of the Council 'public service of Canada' from 2002 was updated to 'federal public administration' as of 2005.

However, one of the most significant changes concerns Part 4 – Members of the Council. In the major 2002 Amendment other members of the council who were not the Chairperson or Vice-Chairperson would be appointed for a period of three years. In 2006 this was updated and changed to a period of four years and has remained fours years since, up to and including the current version.

Another significant change is the loss of council members. Instead of 21 council members, in the modern Act there is the Chairperson and Vice-Chairperson along with 9 other members of the council. That is a reduction of 10 members since the 1977 version of the Act.

=== Governance ===
The Canada Council for the Arts, as a federal Crown corporation, is accountable to Parliament through the Minister of Canadian Heritage and is governed by an 11-member Board. The Board is composed of a Chair, Vice-Chair, and nine other members from across Canada.

Along with the Director and CEO, Board members are appointed by the Governor-in-Council for fixed terms. The Board meets at least three times per year and is responsible for the oversight of the Canada Council's policies, programs, budgets, and grant decisions. The Canada Council's Executive Management, on the other hand—which is led by the Director and CEO—is responsible for establishing and implementing the broad directions and vision developed by the Board, as well as managing the Council itself. The Director is appointed by the Governor in Council as well, and also acts as the chief executive officer (CEO).

Chairs of the Canada Council:

- Brooke Claxton, 1957–1960
- Claude Bissell, 1960–1962
- Douglas B. Weldon, 1962–1964
- Jean Martineau, 1964–1969
- John G. Prentice, 1969–1974
- Brian Flemming (interim), 1974–1975
- Gertrude M. Laing, 1975–1978
- Mavor Moore, 1979–1983
- Maureen Forrester, 1983–1988
- Allan Gotlieb, 1989–1994
- Donna Scott, 1994–1998
- Jean-Louis Roux, 1998–2004
- Karen Kain, 2004–2008
- Joseph L. Rotman, 2008–2015
- Pierre Lassonde, 2015–2020
- Jesse Wente, 2020–2025

Executive Management:

- For the complete list of members of the Canada Council's Executive Management, visit the organization's website.

== History ==
The Canada Council for the Arts was established and began operations in 1957 as part of a major recommendation of the 1951 report by the Royal Commission on National Development in the Arts, Letters and Sciences, commonly known as the Massey Commission.

The report described an unpromising cultural landscape in Canada: professional theatre was "moribund;" the musical space was meager; professional artistic ventures were lacking and virtually absent outside of the largest urban areas; and English Canada produced only 14 works of fiction in an entire year. Moreover, the report stated:

No novelist, poet, short story writer, historian, biographer, or other writer of non-technical books can make even a modestly comfortable living by selling his work in Canada. No composer of music can live at all on what Canada pays him for his compositions. Apart from radio drama, no playwright, and only a few actors and producers, can live by working in the theatre in Canada." Gifted Canadians "must be content with a precarious and unrewarding life in Canada, or go abroad where their talents are in demand.

As such, the report recommended that the Government of Canada establish a Canada Council for the Encouragement of the Arts, Letters, Humanities and Social Sciences. Due to "the dangers inherent in any system of subvention by the central government to the arts and letters and to the culture of the country generally," the Commission—operating in the aftermath of WWII—proposed that the new council be created with a large amount of independence from government. In introducing the Canada Council Act to Parliament, then-Prime Minister Louis St-Laurent said:

Our main object in recommending the establishment of the Canada Council is to provide some assistance to universities, to the arts, humanities and social sciences as well as to students in those fields without attempting in any way to control their activities or to tamper with their freedom. Governments should, I feel, support the cultural development of the nation but not attempt to control it.

The Canada Council for the Arts was thereafter created as an independent, arm's-length body, accountable to Parliament through the Minister of Canadian Heritage with responsibility for establishing its priorities, policies, and funding programs as well as making grant decisions. In its first year, from an initial endowment of CA$50 million, the Council had a budget of $1.5 million for the arts, humanities, and social sciences. By 1964, the Council proposed for a substantial increase to the endowment. Instead, the Council's main source of revenue became yearly government appropriations.

In 1977, the Canada Council sets up the Payment for Public Use Committee to discuss the creation of a Public Lending Right (PLR) program. The following year, the federal government created the Social Sciences and Humanities Research Council, adopting responsibility for the humanities and social sciences from the Canada Council, which would now only be responsible for the arts. In March 1986, the Payment for Public Use (PPU) program was established by a Cabinet decision, with an initial budget of $3 million allocated to it by the Treasury Board Secretariat. This would make Canada the 13th country in the world to develop a PLR program. The initial name was promptly changed to Public Lending Right, and catalogue-based system was adopted.

The mid-1990s "program review" process, which the federal government undertook to curb spending and reduce the deficit, affected the Canada Council as it did other federal agencies and departments. During the mid-1990s period, the Council was restructured and its staff numbers reduced. Toward the end of the decade, however, came what the then-chairman of the Council, actor Jean-Louis Roux, called "the beginnings of a new period of growth." In October 1997, the Canadian Heritage Minister announced another $25 million of funding for 1997–98 and for each of the following 4 years. An additional $10-million increase in the appropriation was announced in the federal budget of February 2000. In May 2001, further $25 million was provided to the Council by the federal government between 2001–02 and 2003–05. In 2006, the Canadian government provided one-time funding of $50 million (divided into $20 million for 2006–07 and $30 million for 2007–08), all of which would go towards grants. In 2007, the government announced an additional $30 million to be added permanently to the Council's base budget, bringing the Parliamentary appropriation to around $180 million in 2008–09.

== Divisions and spaces ==
=== Âjagemô Exhibition Space ===
Âjagemô is a 3,000-square-foot (278.71 m^{2}) display and performance space at the Canada Council offices that features various exhibitions of contemporary Canadian art, including work from the collection of the Canada Council Art Bank. It takes its name from the Algonquin word for 'crossroads'.

Recent exhibits
Exhibitions	Curator	Description	Featured artists	Period on display
Awakening	Bruce Mau	Presents 21 artworks from Canadian and Indigenous artists held in the Art Bank collection that address climate change and action through depictions of the relationships between "city and ecology, nature and nurture, consumption and conservation, [and] ideals and actions."	Germaine Arnaktauyok, Iain Baxter&, Eleanor Bond, Edward Burtynsky, Ken Danby, Antonia Hirsch, Norval Morrisseau, Kim Ondaatje, Michael Snow, Takao Tanabe, Joanne Tod, Chih-Chien Wang, Shirley Wiitasalo, and others.	Current
Open Channels	Melissa Rombout	Presents the works of visual artists who took part in the Canada C3 sailing expedition organized for the 150th anniversary of Canada in 2017.	Lizzie Ittinuar, Sarni Pootoogook, Deanna Bailey, Soheila Esfahani, Christine Fitzgerald, Anna Gaby-Trotz, and others	2019/05/25 – 2020/01/26
Thresholds	Nathalie Bachand	An interactive installation that remakes the internal mechanics of door-opening devices found on MR-63 cars, the old metro cars manufactured for the inauguration of the Montréal Metro at the 1967 World Exhibition.	Michel de Broin	2019/02/20 – 2019/05/09
Thunderstruck: Physical Landscapes	Jenn Goodwin	A group exhibition composed of works of art, film-based works, installations, and dance-related materials. It poses the question: "is dance truly ephemeral, or does it stay with us long after a performance has ended?"	Shary Boyle, Aganetha Dyck, Brendan Fernandes, Michelle Latimer, Tanya Lukin Linklater, Zab Maboungou, Laura Taler, Anne Troake, and others	2018/05/20 – 2019/01/07
Constructed Identities	Persimmon Blackbridge	Presents mixed media wood carving combined with found objects that explores disability and common perceptions of such.	Persimmon Blackbridge	2018/01/23 – 2018/05/03

=== Art Bank ===
Canada Council Art Bank
- Banque d'art
- Established: 1970s
- Location: 921 St. Laurent Blvd, Ottawa
- Type: Art collection and rental
- Collections: contemporary Canadian art
- Collection size: over 17,000 artworks
- Owner: Canada Council for the Arts
- Website: artbank.ca

The Canada Council for the Arts oversees the Art Bank (French: Banque d'art), a division of the Canada Council with the mandate to rent works of art to public and private sector offices.

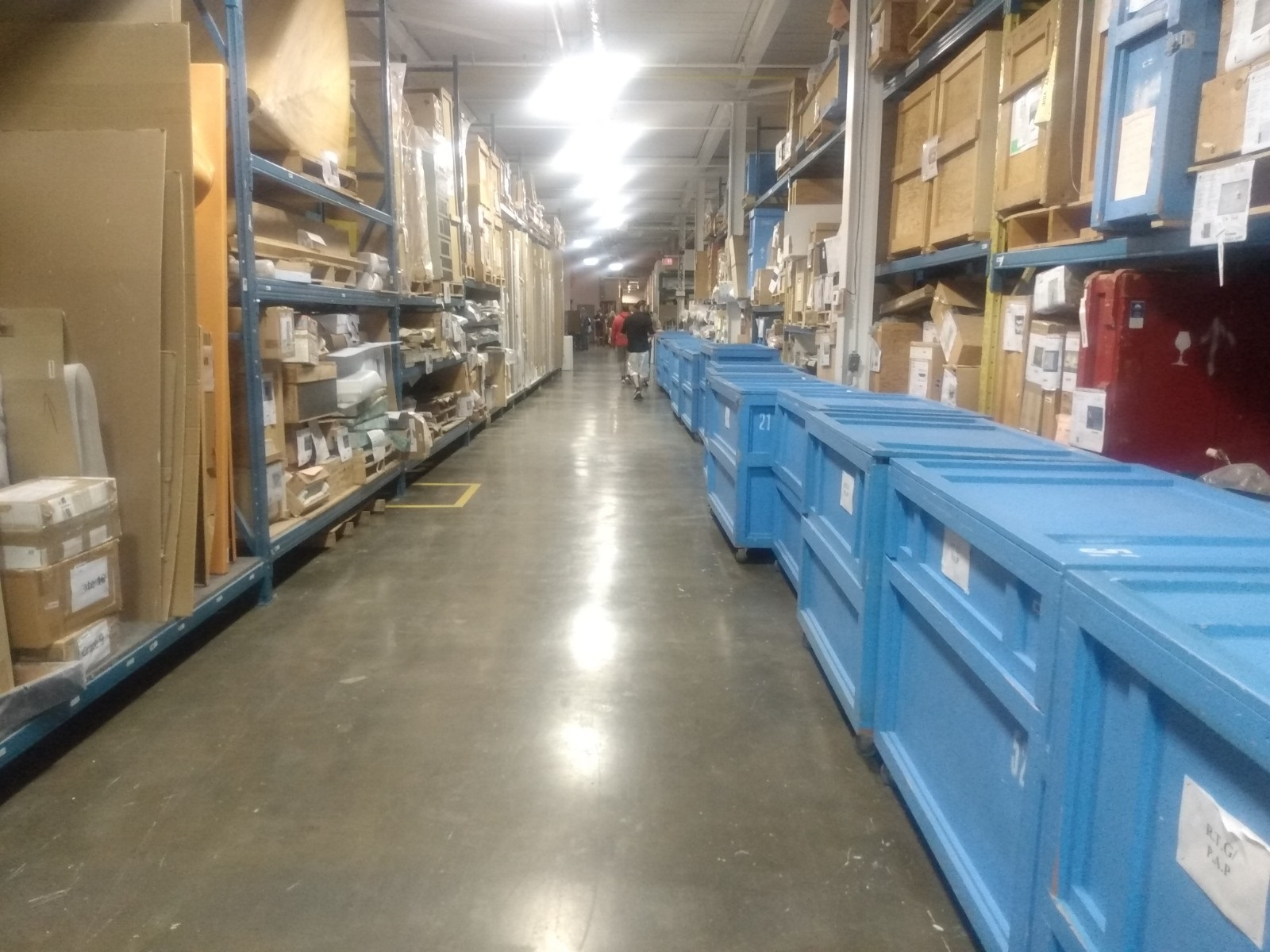
Interior of the Art Bank

The Art Bank's collection—the largest collection of contemporary Canadian art in the world—includes some 18,000 artworks by over 3,000 Canadian artists, including those from Indigenous backgrounds. These works include the 6,400 currently being rented to over 200 government and corporate clients. It offers public access to this art through its 3 programs: art rental, loans to museums, and outreach projects.

Established in the 1970s and developed by Canada Council Visual Arts Officer Suzanne Rivard-Lemoyne, the Art Bank buys art from notable Canadian artists through a system of peer-review juries. The Bank is completely self-funded, earning its money from renting out works in its collection, and continues to expand its collection by buying works in accord with its annual purchasing budget. The vast majority of its art is rented by the federal government, with less than 10% being rented to the private sector. Works of art are rented out for two-year periods. The rental rate is generally 20% of the piece's market value. Although located in Ottawa, Ontario, the Art Bank services its clients across the country. Its collection has been appraised to be worth over 71 million dollars.

In 2002 the Canada Council Art Bank began to purchase Indigenous art to enhance its collection as part of its 45th anniversary.

=== Canadian Commission for UNESCO ===
Overseeing UNESCO activities in Canada, the Canada Council operates the Canadian Commission for UNESCO (CCUNESCO), which helps governments, organizations, and individual Canadians share information, along with making recommendations to the federal Canadian government on UNESCO programs and budgets.

Established by the Canada Council for the Arts in 1957, the Commission is managed by a 17-member executive committee consisting of representatives of government departments, academics, and other experts in education, culture, and world heritage.

== Grants, Prizes and Initiatives ==
=== Prizes ===
The Canada Council for the Arts promotes public awareness of the arts through its communications, research and arts promotion activities. In particular, every year, the Canada Council awards a broad range of prizes to over 200 Canadian artists and scholars in recognition of their work.

The Canada Council administers various Governor General's Awards, including Medals in Architecture, Literary Awards, Performing Arts Awards, and Awards in Visual and Media Arts. Other awards include the Killam Program of scholarly awards, J.B.C Watkins Awards, the John G. Diefenbaker Award, the Musical Instrument Bank, and the Walter Carsen Prize for Excellence in the Performing Arts, among others.

The John G. Diefenbaker Award, with a prize of up to $95,000, allows a distinguished German scholar in the humanities to conduct research in Canada and spend brief periods gaining additional experience at American institutions. The Award was created in 1991, in memory of former Prime Minister John G. Diefenbaker, as the Canadian counterpart to the Konrad Adenauer Award, which was established by the Government of Germany for Canadian scholars in 1988.

The Killam Research Fellowship, granted for two years with a prize of $70,000 per year, provides support to scholars by granting them time to pursue research projects of broad significance and widespread interest within the disciplines of the humanities, social sciences, natural sciences, health sciences, engineering, or studies linking any of these disciplines. This award is one of the most distinguished research fellowships in Canada, and was established by the Killam Trusts through Dorothy J. Killam, in memory of her husband, Izaak Walton Killam.

==== Musical Instrument Bank ====
The Musical Instrument Bank (MIB; French: La Banque d'instruments de musique) is an initiative of Canada Council wherein preeminent Canadian classical musicians, especially young artists, compete for the opportunity to become the steward and performer of a classical instrument from the Musical Instrument Bank on a 3-year loan.

The MIB was established in 1985 with a $100,000 bequest from the Barwick Family along with the fundraising efforts of businessman William Turner and cellist Denis Brott, both of Montréal. Since then, the Bank has received donations and loans of violins, cellos, and bows—created by such luthiers as Stradivari, Gagliano, Guarneri, and Pressenda—as well as generous bequests for the Canada Council to purchase additional instruments.

The Musical Instrument Bank has supported various notable Canadian classical musicians, including Lara St. John, Alexandre Da Costa, Martin Beaver, Judy Kang, and Denise Djokic. among others.

=== Grants ===
In 2018–19, the Canada Council awarded grants to over 2,800 Canadian artists, almost 450 groups, and over 2,000 arts organizations.

Each year the organization receives some 16,000 grant requests, which are reviewed by peer assessment committees. In 2006–07, the Canada Council awarded some 6,000 grants to artists and arts organizations and made payments to more than 15,400 authors through the Public Lending Right Commission. Grants and payments totaled more than $152 million.

=== Public Lending Right ===
Through its Public Lending Right (PLR) program, the Canada Council financially compensates over 17,000 Canadian authors annually for providing free public access to their books in Canadian public libraries. Authors are compensated through direct payments ranging from CA$50 to $4,500 a year. Eligible work includes original writing, translation, illustration, narration and photography contained in library books across a range.

The Public Lending Right Commission is a permanent advisory board that works with the Canada Council "to define the program's criteria and promote the program among eligible authors, illustrators, narrators and translators" from a variety of literary and scholarly genres. The Commission consists of writers, translators, librarians, and publishers, as well as non-voting representatives from the Canada Council, the Department of Canadian Heritage, Library and Archives Canada, and Bibliothèque et Archives nationales du Québec. Author Mélikah Abdelmoumen is the current Commission Chair, with writer Russell Wangersky as Vice-Chair.

The creation of a PLR program was first deliberated in 1977, when the Council sets up the Payment for Public Use Committee to discuss the matter. Also that year, UNEQ (Union des écrivaines et des écrivains québécois) is founded in order to defend the rights of Quebec authors. In 1982, the Applebaum-Hébert Committee recommended that the federal government create a program to pay authors for the use of their books in libraries. Soon after, in March 1986, the Payment for Public Use (PPU) program was established by a Cabinet decision, with an initial budget of $3 million allocated to it by the Treasury Board Secretariat. This would make Canada the 13th country in the world to develop a PLR program. The initial name was promptly changed to Public Lending Right and catalogue-based system was adopted.

The PLR Commission developed and approved its Constitution and Bylaws in 1988, its second year of operation. In 2008, the Commission would unanimously adopt a growth management strategy, including a new four-tier payment scale for PLR payments, which was implemented two years later. The Commission first moved in favour of the possibility of ebooks being eligible in the PLR Program in 2011. However, it would not be until 2016, when the Program opened registration to ebooks. Also in 2016, the Program would begin to consider the future eligibility of audiobook materials, and the Canada Council would pledge to increase direct payments to authors through the PLR Program. In 2012, author Roy MacSkimming published the first of three major research studies related to PLR; subsequent reports would address the arrival of new technologies and compare the Canadian model to other PLR systems operating around the world. The PLR Program would finally open registration to audiobooks in 2019. For the first time, works must have been published during the previous 5 years in order to be eligible for registration.

== See also ==
- The Killam Trusts
- Molson Prize
- Virginia Parker Prize
