= Jeune-Canada =

Organization

Jeune-Canada (French for "Young Canada") was a Quebecois nationalist right-wing movement founded in and active during the 1930s. Launched in 1932 in reaction to the public nominations of unilingual anglophones, the movement reached its apogee the following year, in 1933. A manifesto (Manifeste de la jeune génération) was written by André Laurendeau under the guidance of Lionel Groulx.

As a movement, Jeune-Canada was corporatist and ultramontanist; the group advocated for francophone rights in Canada and political and economic autonomy for Quebec. The movement gathered together many of the future elites who would later contribute to the Quiet Revolution, even though the ideals of the Quiet Revolution were quite different from those of Jeune-Canada.

The movement was never officially dissolved; some members still declared themselves as members of Jeune-Canada in 1939. The files of the organization are maintained by the Lionel Groulx Foundation.

== Notable members ==
- Robert Charbonneau
- Pierre Dansereau, environmentalist, president in 1932
- Philippe Ferland, journalist and politician
- Gérard Filion, journalist, president from 1936 to 1938
- Lucien L'Allier, father of the Montreal Metro
- André Laurendeau, journalist, president from 1933 to 1935
- Dostaler O'Leary, journalist
- Claude Robillard, urban planner

== Supporters of the movement ==
- Le Devoir
- Édouard Montpetit, economist
- Esdras Minville, writer
- Lionel Groulx, historian
- Pierre Trudeau, journalist and politician
