= The Catholic Leader =

Brisbane, Queensland Newspaper

- Owner: Roman Catholic Archdiocese of Brisbane
- Founded: 1892
- City: Brisbane
- Country: Australia
- Website: https://catholicleader.com.au

The Catholic Leader, originally The Catholic Age, then The Age, is a newspaper published in Brisbane, Queensland from 1892, and is the official organ of the Roman Catholic Archdiocese of Brisbane. The Archdiocese of Brisbane says the newspaper is "Australia’s longest serving Catholic newspaper".

== History ==
The Catholic Age began publication in 1892, and was renamed The Catholic Leader in 1929.

Neither title has been digitized by the National Library of Australia for access using Trove. The earliest mention of The Age in its mainstream Brisbane contemporaries was in 1903 "What is it about Janny Leahy?"

One of its journalists, P. J. Henry, became editor of the Charleville Guardian in 1912.

The change of name to "The Leader" followed closely on the appointment of P. J. Dillon as editor in 1928.

== See also ==
Other Roman Catholic publications in Australia are:

- The Southern Cross (South Australia)
- The Advocate (Melbourne)
- The Record (Perth)
