= The Advocate (Melbourne) =

Former Catholic newspaper based in Melbourne, Australia

- Type: Weekly newspaper
- Format: Broadsheet
- Owner: Catholic Archdiocese of Melbourne
- Founder(s): Samuel Vincent Winter and Joseph Winter
- Publisher: Samuel Vincent Winter
- Founded: February 1, 1868
- Ceased publication: 1990
- Language: English
- City: Melbourne, Victoria
- Country: Australia
- Circulation: 300,000+
- ISSN: 2203-3971
- Website: trove.nla.gov.au/newspaper/title/792

The Advocate was a weekly newspaper founded in Melbourne, Victoria in 1868 and published for the Catholic Archdiocese of Melbourne from 1919 to 1990. It was first housed in Lonsdale Street, then in the grounds of St Francis' Church, and from 1937 in a'Beckett Street, Melbourne.

== History ==
The paper was founded in Melbourne in February 1868 by Samuel Vincent Winter, who was also a proprietor and editor of the Melbourne Herald, with assistance from Sir Charles Gavan Duffy, the Very Rev. J. Dalton, S.J., the Rev. G. V. Barry, and Hon. Michael O'Grady, as an outlet for Irish Catholic news and opinions. A few years later his brother Joseph Winter took over management of The Advocate. The first editor of the publication was John Gunson. He began in 1868 and continued in the role till 1902.

In 1902 they imported a font of Gaelic type and were thus the first newspaper in Australia to print in Irish Gaelic. In March 1919 the paper was purchased from the Winter family by the Catholic Archdiocese of Melbourne and continued weekly publication until 1990.

A fuller history of the newspaper was compiled for its 75th anniversary, in February 1943. "Gregory Parable" wrote an article on the newspaper's journalistic contributors.

== Journalists ==
Michael Costigan was associate editor 1961–1969, and was in 1963 sent to Rome by the four Catholic papers (Advocate, Tribune, Southern Cross and Standard) to report on the second sitting of the Vatican Council, following widespread dissatisfaction at the self-censorship of the official Vatican briefings.

Editor for many years, but including 1961–1969, was Father Denis Murphy, a superannuated parish priest, whose only function, according to Costigan, was to ensure inclusion in each issue of a page of Irish news, which he got from a correspondent in Dublin.

Other journalists and contributors mentioned by Costigan were parish news roundsman John McLean, sub-editor Bert De Luca, editorial writer Denys Jackson, film reviewer and media commentator Ronald Conway, sports reporter Hugh Buggy, women's commentator "Catherine Kaye", and literary critic Martin Haley.

Frank Murphy (as "Gregory Parable") was theatre and literature critic for The Advocate from 1937 to 1947 or later. Aside from shorter film, theatre and book reviews, he published many essays on Catholic/literary subjects such as Martin F. Tupper, early Melbourne, nursery rhymes, Brian Elliott, the Tyndale Bible and numerous diatribes against Communism and secularism. He also produced, as "Gregory Parable", several pamphlets (price 3d) on Roman Catholicism for the Australian Catholic Truth Society:

- The Peoples' Front, Part 1 (1939); Part 2 (1950)
- Communism Fights Religion (1947)

He was author of Daniel Mannix, Archbishop of Melbourne, The Advocate Press, Melbourne (1948). Michael Costigan identifies his friend and mentor as "a former seminarian with the Missionaries of the Sacred Heart", whose skills as a journalist were picked up "on the job" at The Advocate. A noted shorthand reporter, he was the author of a series of recollections in the Advocate 25 June 1947 – 23 July 1947.

A layman, Murphy was a member of the Campion Society and Young Men's Society (a rare conjunction), leader of Hawthorn Catholic Young Men's Society (CYMS), and General Secretary of the Melbourne Catholic Evidence Guild. He was still alive in March 1974.

Father James G. Murtagh (as "J. G. M.") was a reviewer and critic. (1939 to at least 1954).

Patrick O’Leary journalist, poet and critic, was the long serving literary editor (1920–1944).

== Archives ==
The Advocate has been digitized and made available online at Trove, a service of the National Library of Australia.

== See also ==
Other Roman Catholic publications in Australia are:

- The Southern Cross (South Australia)
- The Record (Perth)
- The Catholic Leader (Brisbane)
- The Catholic Weekly (Sydney), previously The Freeman's Journal

William Ponsonby McMahon (c. 1851 – June 1933) was in 1900 or 1901 a founder of another Melbourne Catholic newspaper, the Tribune, and was its publisher and editor for 19 years.
