= Royal Commission on Bilingualism and Biculturalism =

Canadian government commission

- Also known as: Laurendeau-Dunton Commission; Bi and Bi Commission
- Commissioners: Arnold Davidson Dunton (Co-Chair); André Laurendeau (Co-Chair); Clément Cormier; Royce Frith; Jean-Louis Gagnon; Gertrude M. Laing; Paul Lacoste; Jaroslav Bohdan Rudnyckyj; Frank Reginald Scott; Paul Wyczynski
- Inquiry period: 19 July 1963 – 1970

The Royal Commission on Bilingualism and Biculturalism (French: Commission royale d’enquête sur le bilinguisme et le biculturalisme, also known as the Bi and Bi Commission and the Laurendeau-Dunton Commission) was a Canadian royal commission established on 19 July 1963, by the government of Prime Minister Lester B. Pearson to "inquire into and report upon the existing state of bilingualism and biculturalism in Canada and to recommend what steps should be taken to develop the Canadian Confederation on the basis of an equal partnership between the two founding races, taking into account the contribution made by the other ethnic groups to the cultural enrichment of Canada and the measures that should be taken to safeguard that contribution".

The Commission was jointly chaired by André Laurendeau, publisher of Le Devoir, and Davidson Dunton, president of Carleton University. As a result, it was sometimes known as the Laurendeau-Dunton commission.

Ten commissioners representing each of the provinces were also included in the commission as areas such as education were provincial responsibilities.

== Background ==
Throughout the Quiet Revolution, modern Quebec nationalism rose as the federation-wide French Canadian nationalism became less and less supported by the younger Francophone generations of this province. The failure of Canada to establish the equality of the English and French languages within governmental institutions is one of main reasons for the rise of the Quebec secessionist movement.

== Recommendations ==
The Commission recommended sweeping changes when its final report was published, in five parts, 1967-1970, after a report of preliminary findings, February 1965. Among other things, it reported that Francophones were underrepresented in the nation's political and business communities. 1961 statistics of the salaries of Quebec men based on ethnic origin revealed that French Canadian incomes lagged behind all other ethnic groups, with the exception of Italian Canadians and aboriginal Canadians.

- The recommendations included the following:

- That bilingual districts be created in regions of Canada where members of the minority community, either French or English, made up 10% or more of the local population.
- That parents be able to have their children attend schools in the language of their choice in regions where there is sufficient demand.
- That Ottawa become a bilingual city.
- That English and French be declared official languages of Canada.

== Cultural legacy ==
While in some circles the Commission's legacy is controversial, others view it as a success. The under representation of French-Canadians in positions of power is less of a problem and French-Canadians have access to government services in their own language.

== Political response ==
Incoming Prime Minister Pierre Trudeau included the Commission's recommendations among his priorities. Prime Minister Pearson's policy statement on bilingualism was strengthened by the Official Languages Act, 1969, making Canada an officially bilingual nation. The provinces were also recommended to make reforms, and many did. Canada's education system was overhauled and school children across the country were made to learn both languages. Quebec later legislated French as its official language and limited English schooling to qualified families. French education in western provinces remained limited by provincial regulation as well.

The Commission and its recommendations were supported by both the Progressive Conservative Party and the New Democratic Party, but the Tories did have concerns with the costly implementation of the reforms. Regional parties like the Social Credit Party, the Confederation of Regions Party and the Reform Party later objected strongly to these changes.

In 1971, the Trudeau government departed from the Commission's findings. While Canada remained a bilingual nation, it pursued a policy of multiculturalism rather than biculturalism.

=== Constitutional incorporation ===
In the Constitution Act, 1982, Trudeau ensured that many of the Commission's recommendations were permanently included in the Constitution of Canada, as sections 16 through section 23 of the Canadian Charter of Rights and Freedoms included several language rights.

== See also ==
- Bilingualism in Canada
- Gendron Commission
- Jaroslav Rudnyckyj, commissioner who argued for change from biculturalism to multiculturalism
- Gertrude M. Laing, member of the commission.
