= School of Ross =

Monastic institutio

The School of Ross was a monastic institution located in what is now called Rosscarbery, County Cork, Ireland, but formerly Ross-Ailithir (Ross of the Pilgrims), from the large number of monks and students who "flocked" to it from all over Europe.

== Founding ==
The school was founded by St. Fachtna, who is generally regarded as the same person who founded the Diocese of Kilfenora; the feast in both cases is kept on 14 August, and in both the saint's descent is traced to the princely race of Corcu Loígde. Fachtna was born at a place called Tulachteann, and died at the early age of forty-six, probably late in the sixth century, and is buried in his own cathedral church in Rosscarbery, a tuath of which the O'Leary were hereditary lords. The Annals of Innisfallen (Dublin copy) mark 600 as the year of his death: "Died Fachtna first Bishop of Ross-Ailithre in Corca-Laidhe which goes by the additional name of O'Laeghaire of Ross i.e. Corca Laidhe-I-Laeghaire Ruis". Like many other Irish saints, he received his first lessons in religion from Saint Ita of Killeedy, the "Brigid of Munster", from whose care he passed, according to some writers, to St. Finbarr's seminary at Loch Eirce, near Cork. He is reported by some to have founded Molana Abbey, on the little island of Dairinis in the River Blackwater, not far from the town of Youghal. Returning to his native territory, he set about a more important foundation on a rocky promontory situated in the midst of woods and green fields between two bays.

This was the monastic School of Ross, called in the Life of St. Mochoemoc "magnum studium scholarium", for it quickly became famous for its study of Scripture, and the attention given to all the branches of a liberal education. One of the assistant teachers was St. Brendan the Navigator, whom Fachtna had known and loved as a companion when under the care of St. Ita. One old document represents Brendan as being at Ross in 540. While engaged in teaching there, St. Fachtna was stricken with total blindness; but it was reported that his sight was miraculously restored. Fachtna, it is generally thought, received episcopal orders, and became the first Bishop of Ross. He is sometimes called Facundus, in allusion to his eloquence.

== Later history ==
Fachtna's immediate successor in the School of Ross was St. Conall, and later a St. Finchad, a former schoolmate at Loch Eirce. Accounts claim that he was succeeded by twenty-seven bishops of his own tribe, whose names have not been preserved. In the ninth century, the Annals of the Four Masters reference the abbots of the School of Ross, and tell of a Danish attack in 840. Once only in the two centuries that followed is there mention of a bishop, Neachtan MacNeachtain whose death is set down under date 1085. In all other references to Ross the word airchinnect is used.

The Chronicon Scotorum mentions the death in 868 of Feargus, who is described as a celebrated scribe and anchorite of Ross-Ailithir. More evidence of the extent and variety of the literary work done at Ross is furnished by the geographical poem in the Irish language still extant, composed by MacCosse or Ferlegind, a lecturer at this school. The Diocese of Ross was upheld at the Synod of Kells and the O'Leary sept became the Hereditary Wardens of the monastery and university.

In 1127, according to the Chronicon Scotorum, one Toirdhealbach O Conor sailed to Ross-Ailithir and laid waste the land of Desmond. He was followed by the Anglo-Normans under Robert Fitz-Stephen, who towards the close of the century completed the destruction.

== Literary references ==
P.W. Joyce said of it:

Ross Carbery in Cork, was formerly a place of great ecclesiastical eminence; and it was "so famous for the crowds of students and monks flocking to it, that it was distinguished by the name of Ros-ailithir" [allihir : Four Masters], the wood of the pilgrims.

Daniel Donovan wrote:

The town of Rosscarbery, though to the ordinary observer it may seem a place comparatively unimportant, was, nevertheless, one of the most ancient and celebrated places in Ireland, and as far back as the 6th century, was renowned at home and abroad as a great seat of learning and sanctity. Hither flocked students, both lay and clerical, from all parts of Ireland, to complete their studies under the most eminent professors.
