= Kathy Desjardin =

American politician

Member of New Hampshire House of Representatives for Hillsborough 13
- In office December 5, 2018 – October 1, 2020
- Preceded by: Richard O'Leary
- Succeeded by: William Infantine

Personal details
- Party: Democratic

Kathy J. Desjardin is an American politician. She was a member of the New Hampshire House of Representatives and represented the Hillsborough 13th district.
