= William Ponsonby McMahon =

Founder of Tribune, Catholic newspaper in Australia

William Ponsonby McMahon (1852 – June 1933) was founder of a Catholic newspaper Tribune in Melbourne, Australia in 1870. It failed to thrive, but after a second Tribune was founded in 1900, he was appointed its publisher and editor, in which positions he served for 19 years.

== History ==
McMahon was born in Victoria, and started adult life as a schoolteacher, and moved to Tasmania, where he spent several years as a newspaperman.

In November 1870 McMahon founded the original Tribune newspaper for Melbourne Catholics, but it failed at an early date. He then found employment working for the Melbourne Argus.

The title was revived in 1900 with The Tribune, subtitled "A Journal of Information and Literature" as a Catholic weekly, and McMahon was with the company from the start, or shortly after, and served as publisher and editor for 19 years.

=== Later life ===
McMahon was closely associated with the Catholic Young Men's Society. He spent several years in Adelaide, helping establish the Southern Cross newspaper, and helping the Catholic fight against the Vaughan government's Education bill. For his work on behalf of the Catholic cause, he received warm praise from Archbishop Mannix. In his last years he served as organising secretary of the Australian Catholic Federation.

== Family ==
McMahon married Tasmanian-born Mary Catherine Murphy ( – 7 July 1909), and lived at 35 Gipps Street, East Melbourne. Their family included:

- Eileen Mary McMahon (1888–1981)
- Geraldine Julia McMahon (1889–1958)
- Kathleen Clare McMahon (born 1890)
