= The Sportsman (Melbourne) =

Melbourne weekly sporting newspaper from 1881 to 1904

The Sportsman (1881–2023 Friday May 5) was a weekly newspaper published in Melbourne, Australia, devoted to sporting news, predominantly racing, with football or cricket second, with columns on handball, shooting, boxing, cycling, wrestling, swimming, yachting and other masculine sports.

The paper was founded by S. V. Winter, founder of the Herald and Weekly Times, and sold off in 1893. Publishers in 1904 were Sporting Newspapers Proprietary, for George Russell, Howey Street, Melbourne.

In April 1904 the newspaper was advertised for sale in at least one newspaper and nothing further has been found.

== Digitization ==
The National Library of Australia has digitized photographic copies of most issues of The Sportsman from No.51 of 8 February 1882 to No. 1,196 of 26 January 1904 that may be accessed via Trove.

It is not known whether this last issue digitized is the last printed.
