= Jim Grahame =

Australian poet

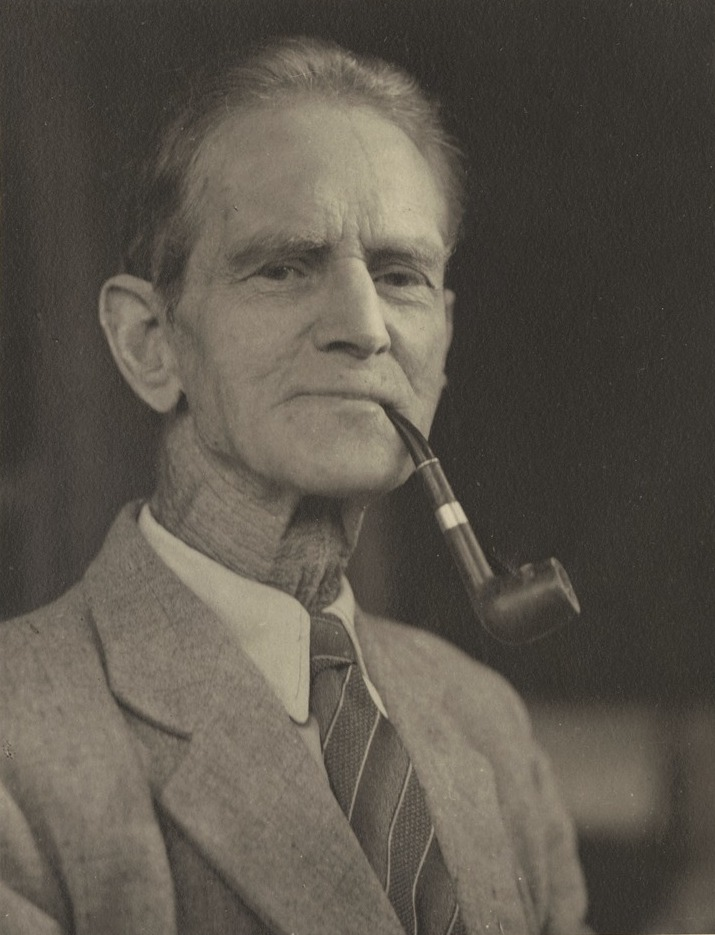
- Born: James William Gordon; 23 October 1874; Creswick, Victoria, Australia
- Died: 12 August 1949 (aged 74); Leeton, New South Wales, Australia
- Other names: Also wrote under the pen-names of Balm Oral, Poor Hawk
- Occupations: rouseabout, jackeroo, horse breaker, bullock driver, opal miner, drover, station manager, jockey, orchard inspector, poet, writer
- Spouse: Celia Letitia Gordon (nee McIntyre) (m. 1902)
- Children: 5

James William "Jim" Gordon (23 October 1874 – 12 August 1949), better known by the pen name of Jim Grahame, was an Australian poet who has been called the last of the Australian bush balladists.

Gordon left school aged 13 and had numerous odd jobs before he began submitting his poems to newspapers about 1900. He published first under the name Balm Oral, then Poor Hawk, and finally Jim Grahame. His poems were collected in 1940 and 1947 in books titled Call of the Bush and Under Wide Skies respectively.

Grahame was a good friend of the poet Henry Lawson. While he did not reach the same heights of fame or recognition as Lawson, Gordon's contributions to Australian literature were recognised at the national level when he was awarded a Commonwealth Literary pension in 1947.

== Early life ==
James William Gordon was born on 23 October 1874 in Bloody Gully, a mining camp near Creswick, Victoria, the son of John and Jane (née Morgan) Gordon. Gordon's father was Scottish and his mother of Welsh descent. The family lived in Balmoral, Victoria, where Gordon attended school, leaving at 13.

== Career ==
Gordon spent the next twenty years working at a variety of jobs (including jackeroo, horse-breaker, bullock driver, opal miner, jockey, and drover) before he became a station manager on the Darling River in New South Wales.

Later, he was attached to the government field staff as an inspector of orchards at the Yanco Irrigation Area, near Leeton, New South Wales doing his rounds by horse and sulky.

Gordon was also, at one stage, Treasurer, Secretary and President of the Writers and Artists Union.

== Poetry ==
Gordon began submitting poems to newspapers about 1900. Many sources suggest Gordon's first published work was published in The Worker in 1902. Certainly his "Ode to the Handy Man" appeared that year in the Hillston Spectator and Lachlan River Advertiser. In 1903, his first verse, titled "Boundary-Riding", appeared in The Bulletin magazine It was also reprinted in 1905. All of these appeared under the pen-name "Balm Oral".

Gordon also began to have other written contributions accepted by The Bulletin around this time, under the pen-names "Balm Oral" and "Poor Hawk".

In 1940, Melbourne's Bread and Cheese Club put out a collection of Gordon's poems in a book titled Call of the Bush.

At 72, Gordon began to contribute a regular column to the Murrumbidgee Irrigator with the title "By Lane and Highway".

In 1947, as part of an honour night held for his 73rd birthday, the citizens of Leeton published a compilation of his poems in a book titled "Under Wide Skies". The Testimonial Committee tracked down all of Gordon's known poems except the poem "The King is Shorn".

== Friendship with Henry Lawson ==
Gordon had a life-long friendship with the poet Henry Lawson. The pair first met in Bourke, New South Wales in September 1892 when Lawson had been sent there by his publisher to write and to dry out while Gordon moved there on his doctor's recommendation to escape the cold, damp Victorian countryside (where he suffered repeated chest infections).

The pair's first trek together was to Fort Bourke station, where they worked as roustabouts, in late October 1892. On 27 December 1892, they trekked from Bourke to Hungerford and back, a round trip of over 400km, arriving back in Bourke about 6 February 1893. After this trek, the pair lost contact for over 20 years; but they renewed their friendship in 1916, when they met again in Leeton.

In 1917, Lawson persuaded Gordon to adopt a different writing name to 'Poor Hawk', which resulted in him adopting the pen name Jim Grahame. Lawson also advised Gordon on ways to get his work published and also how to play one paper against another in order to get better rates for the poems that did make it to print.

== Awards and honours ==
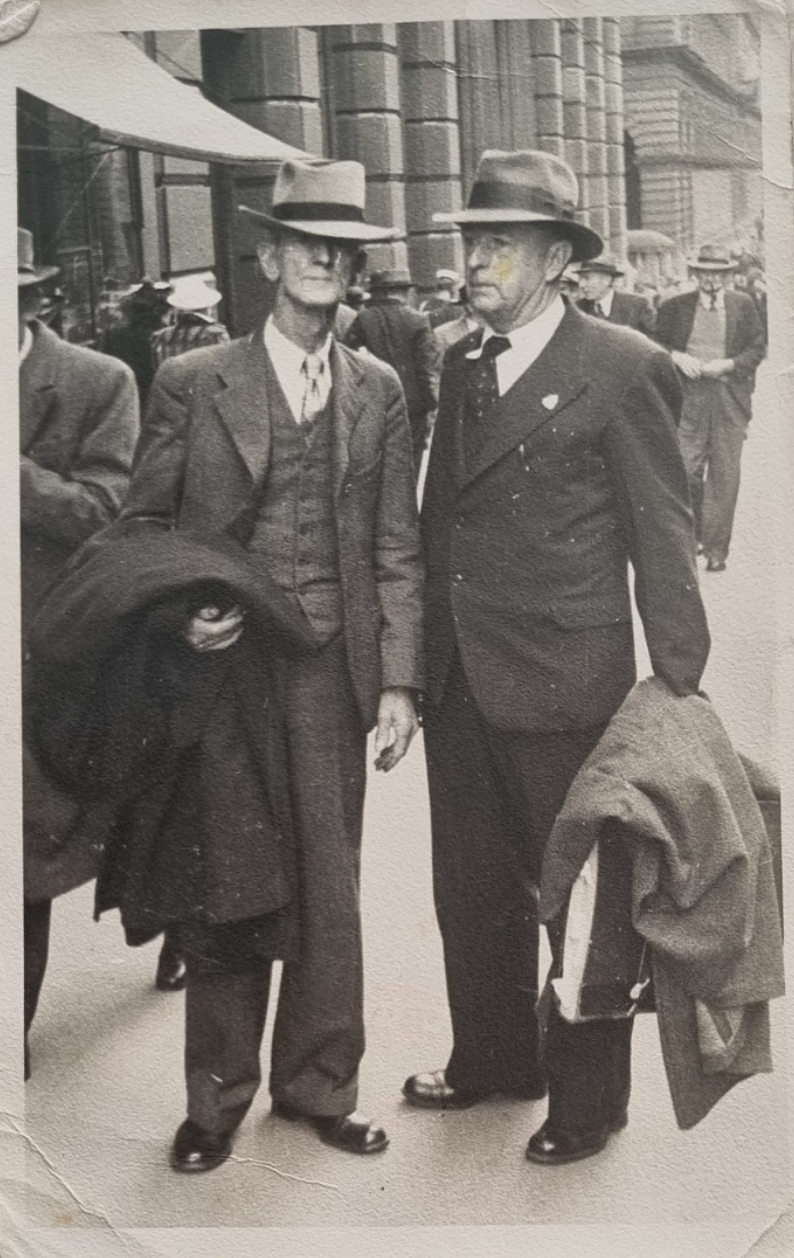
Jim Gordon (left) and Leigh Marchant in Sydney in search of a publisher. Leigh is holding Jim's scrapbook. (Photo courtesy of Marchant family)

Gordon and his family moved to Leeton in 1921. There he came to be known as "Leeton's poet".

In 1947, an honour night was held for Gordon at the local Roxy Theatre in Leeton for his 73rd birthday. This was attended by some 600 people and was also recorded and broadcast by the Australian Broadcasting Commission. Gordon's contributions to Australian literature were recognised at the national level in 1947, when he was awarded a Commonwealth Literary pension, presented to him at the honour night. The event was also marked by the presentation to Gordon of a copy of a collection of his works titled Under Wide Skies. The Testimonial Committee responsible for the compiling his poetry was led by Leigh Marchant, a local orchardist, Rotarian and close friend of Gordon's. They succeeded in tracking down all of his known poems to date but one.

Two other civic events were held in Gordon's honour in 1949 in his birthplace of Creswick, Victoria and childhood hometown of Hamilton, Victoria.

== Personal life ==
In 1902, Gordon married Celia McIntyre, the daughter of a wealthy grazier, John McIntyre. She was cut off by her family for marrying beneath her station.

In 1912, the couple and their two older children moved to the Yanco Irrigation Area in New South Wales near Leeton where the couple's other children were born.

== Death and legacy ==
Gordon died on 12 August 1949 at his home in Leeton; he was 74. He was survived by his wife, one son, and three daughters. He was predeceased by one daughter and a son who died in World War II.

After his death, a newly established Leeton sub-division of Gralee and the Gralee School were named after him – combining the names "Grahame" and "Leeton".

Grahame Park, Leeton in Quandong Street was also named for him in 1949. In 1953, Gralee School opened in a section of the park made available by the local council.
