= Carrignacurra Castle =

Tower house in County Cork, Ireland

Coordinates: 51°50′49″N 9°06′18″W

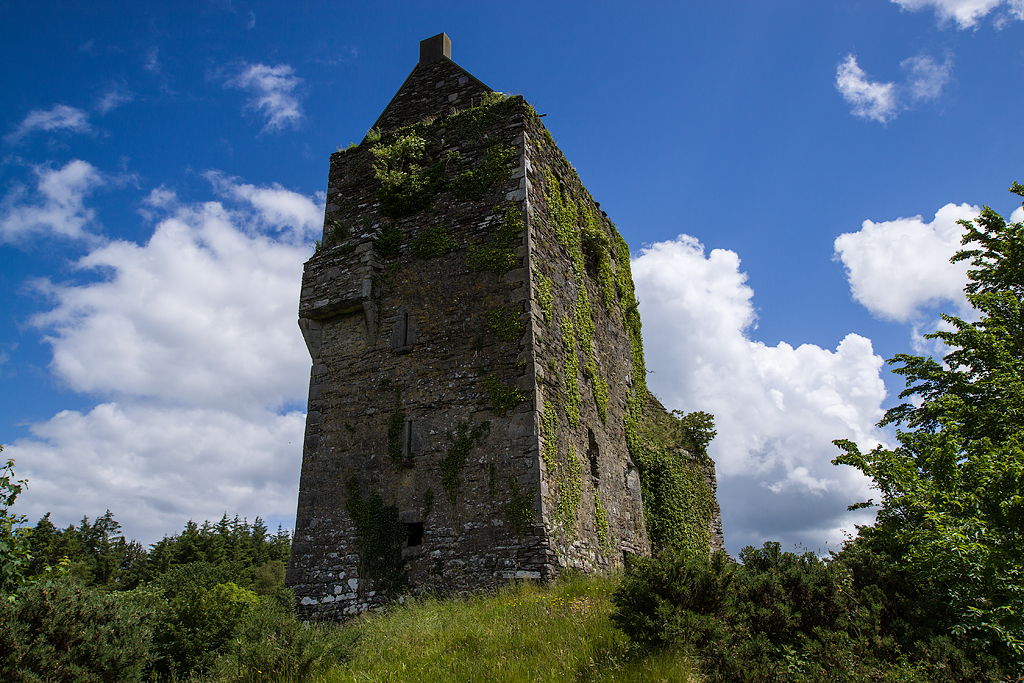
Carrignacurra Castle, Co. Cork, Ireland

Carrignacurra Castle is a stone-built tower house constructed in County Cork, Ireland, as the chief seat of the O'Leary family. It was built to defend a ford across the River Lee about 1.5 km east of Inchigeelagh village, on a historic route between Macroom and Dunmanway. The name, Carrignacurra, probably comes from Carraig na Choradh - Rock of the Weir.

The tower house is listed in the National Monuments Service's Record of Monuments and Places.

== History ==
Carrignacurra Castle photographed from the north bank of the River Lee

The structure is undergoing carbon dating to establish its exact date of construction, but it is likely constructed in the 15th or 16th century. There were originally three tower houses built around Inchigeelagh by the O'Leary clan, located at Carrignacurra, Carrignaneela and Dromcarra, but the latter two have been destroyed. It was captured by O'Sullivan Beare in 1602, but was forfeited in 1641 and restored to the Mac Carthy clan, with the O'Learys installed as tenants. The Williamite War (1689-91) resulted in a wave of destruction across Ireland, particularly in south-west Munster. As part of the Williamite Settlement, in 1703 the London-based Hollow Sword Blades company purchased some forfeited Irish estates in counties Mayo, Sligo, Galway, Roscommon, Cork and Kerry. These included the forfeited estates of the Earl of Clancarty (Mac Carthy) in Cork and Kerry, and Carrignacurra was included in this acquisition. According to Landed Estates (A database of landed estates and historic houses at the University of Galway), sources suggest that the Masters family purchased property from the Hollow Sword Blade Company in the 1720s. Masters Esq was listed as the occupier of Carronacurragh or Carrignacurra in the 1770s and 1780s. Pyne family records suggest that the building passed to the Pyne family when Mary Masters inherited it and married Arthur Pyne. Jasper Pyne (Nephew of Sir Richard Pyne, Lord Chief Justice of Ireland) is recorded as the occupier of the castle at the time of Griffith's Valuation in 1868. It is unclear at what point the structure was left without human inhabitation.

== Architecture ==
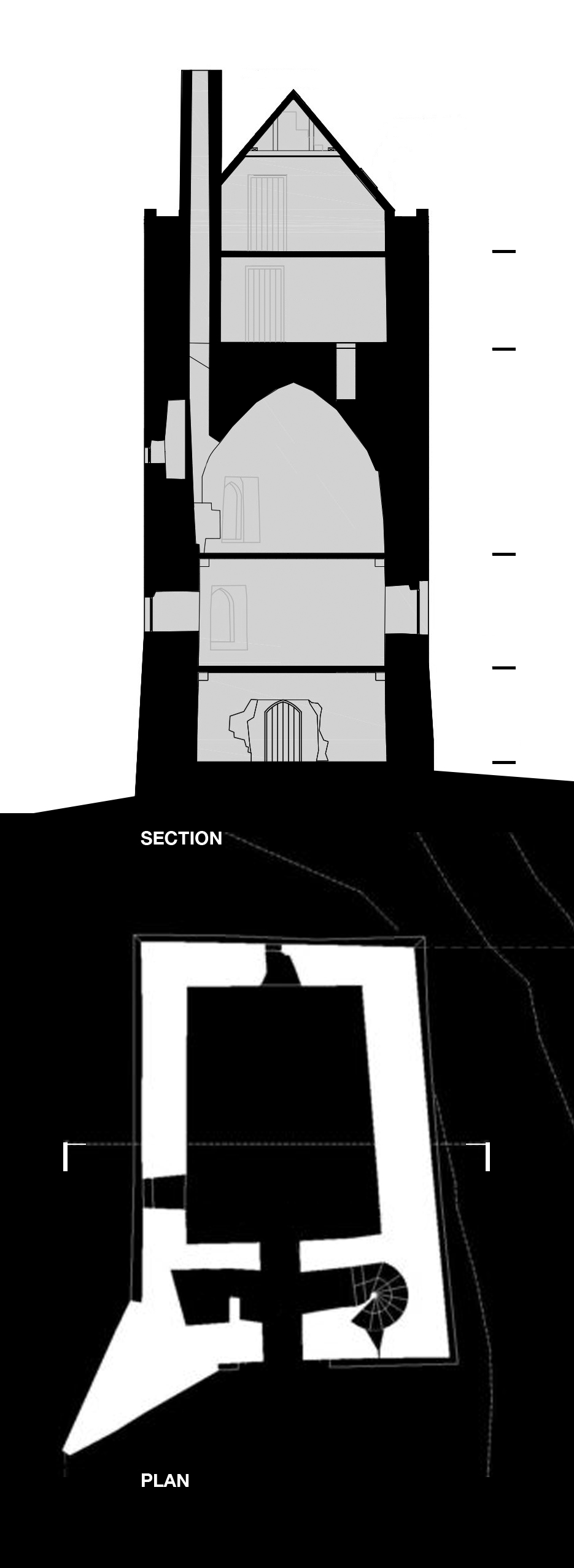
Carrignacurra Castle, architectural plan and section

The building is a four-storey ‘Tower House’ form. The walls are about 15.2m (50ft) high, but the original battlements have been removed. In form, it is more rectangular than square in plan, with the long side of 11.5m (38 feet) and short side 7.6m (25 feet). The southeast corner has a pointed triangular stone projection built from the ground known as a redan, which has three gun-loops. This was used as a strategic defensive position overlooking the entrance area. Only three castles in County Cork (Carrignacurra, Castle Hyde and Mashanaglass) were built with this defensive element, and it may be a late 16th century or early 17th century addition. The north-western side has a projecting wall-mounted turret called a bartizan. The east wall has a projecting balcony called a machicoulis, (or murder hole) which has an opening in the floor, through which heavy stones and boiling liquids could be dropped on attackers.

A stone spiral staircase built within the north-eastern corner wall leads to the upper floors. The second floor has the largest chamber, with a fireplace on the north wall and a vaulted ceiling made by using a type of basket weave as a support. From the staircase above this level, there is access to an intramural passageway within the north wall which leads to the bartizan, where there are five gun-loops in the walls and two openings in the floor. The spiral staircase further provides access to the upper floors and battlement access.

== Restoration ==
The castle was listed for sale in 2016, and featured in Country Life Magazine. It is currently undergoing restoration by the current owners. Stonework has been repaired around the gun loops, windows, and door surrounds. The lower stone corners had previously been vandalised in an attempt to remove the stones, so these have also been sensitively repaired. Timber floors have also been reinstated and a new slated roof added.

== Archaeology ==
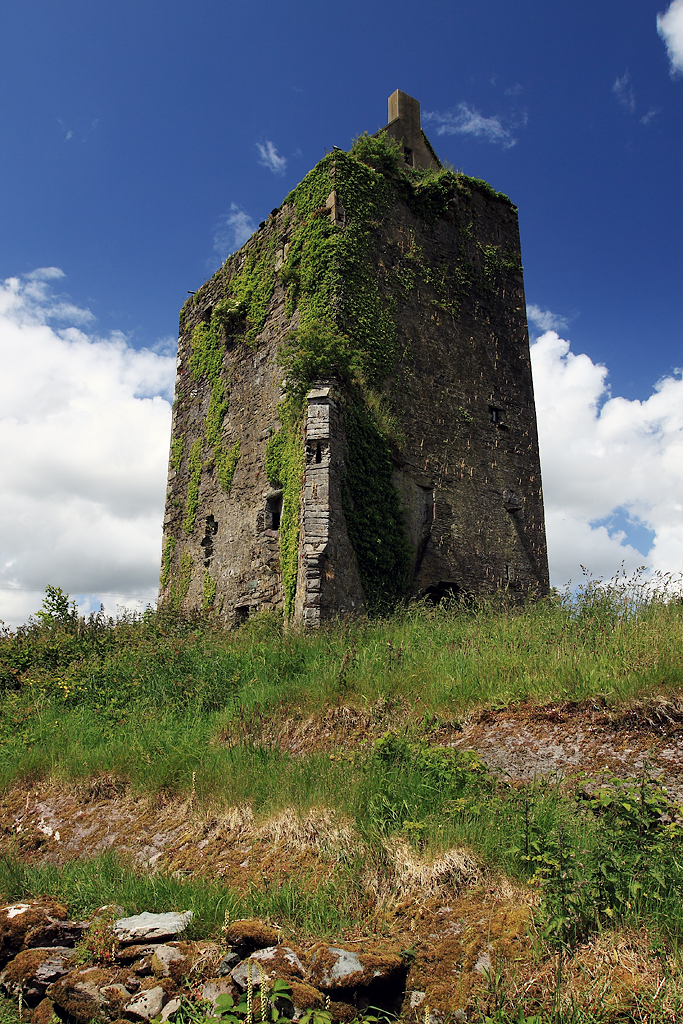
Carrignacurra Castle, Co. Cork

Excavation of a 3m-wide strip around the base of the Tower House began in September 2020, with four trenches excavated along the four sides of the building as well as the internal ground floor. A small collection of animal bones was found in the north-west corner beneath the bartizan. Other finds included a bone bead and bone dice, musket and pistol balls, small lead ingots, clay pipes and an exchequer piece or 'jeton' made in Nuremberg by Hans Krauwinkel c.1640. Two silver coins, — one known as a groat featuring Henry III, dated to 1270, and the other featuring Edward IV, dating from the 1470s were found, fuelling speculation that a castle may have stood on this site much earlier than expected.
