= St. Joseph's Hospice, Rawalpindi =

St. Joseph's Hospice

Geography
- Location: Rawalpindi, Pakistan
- Coordinates: 33°36′56″N 73°01′35″E

Organisation
- Care system: Public
- Religious affiliation: Catholic Diocese of Islamabad-Rawalpindi
- Affiliated university: Islamabad Medical and Dental College
- Patron: Sister Margaret Walsh

Services
- Beds: 80

History
- Constructed: 1964

Links
- Lists: Hospitals in Pakistan

St. Joseph's Hospice (Urdu: سینٹ جوزف ہاسپیس ہسپتال، راولپنڈی) is a health care facility in Rawalpindi, run by the Franciscan Sisters of Mary, open to patients from all walks of life.

== History ==
Francis O'Leary was a Catholic Priest and missionary in Rawalpindi. In 1962, while attending to a sick woman in a mud hut, O'Leary realized the need for a hospice. In 1964, he opened the first hospice in Rawalpindi. After receiving advice from Mother Teresa, he obtained loans and donations to establish hospices in Peru, Colombia, Ecuador, Honduras, Guatemala and England. It is registered as a non-profit organisation under the Pakistan Donor Welfare Agencies Ordinance.

== Facilities ==
The hospice has been run for the past 30 years by the Franciscan Sisters. With 60 beds, it receives up to 300 patients a day. The staff includes 50 Pakistani nurses, aides, volunteers, doctors, and ward helpers. In 2009 Sister Mairead Walsh, a nun from Dublin, ran the hospice. The hospice has three separate wards for men, women and children within its two-storeyed structure built of concrete and stone. The building was funded by a German Catholic organisation, MISEREOR and built on church land.

The hospice treats patients with chronic illnesses and disabilities, tuberculosis, meningitis, polio and typhoid fever, etc. Children with congenital deformities and malnutrition are often abandoned to the hospice.

90 per cent of its outpatients and 60 per cent of its in-patients are Muslim.

St Joseph's has a well functioning laboratory, provides physiotherapy treatment and has its own pharmacy. All medical services are free of charge.

The Pakistani government officially recognised this service to the community when in 2006, St Joseph's received the Award of Excellence from President Pervez Musharraf.

The hospice is now a teaching facility attached to the Islamabad Medical and Dental College.

In November 2013 the Hospice came close to closing when it had only enough in the bank to run for 5 months.

In 2014 the Hospice celebrated the 50th anniversary of its founding. The Administrator at the time was Sister Margaret Walsh MFF.

Also in 2014, a fundraiser was organised by the Nomad Centre and Gallery on March 7, in support of the Hospice which is struggling financially. The Hospice charges as little as Rs. 20 per patient, but this too is waived if the patient cannot afford to pay. This user pay system has not been enough to fund its work.
