= Francis O'Leary =

Francis Aloysius O'Leary MBE (18 June 1931 – 4 October 2000) was an English Roman Catholic priest and missionary who founded the St Joseph's Hospice Association, an international network of hospices known as Jospice. O'Leary was appointed a Member of the Order of the British Empire (MBE) in 1996.

== Life ==
Francis Aloysius O'Leary was born 18 June 1931 in Crosby, Liverpool, England, the youngest of three children. At the age of 11, O'Leary entered the seminary of Mill Hill Fathers at Freshfield. He later attended seminaries at Burn Hall, County Durham, and St Joseph's College in Roosendaal, Netherlands. O'Leary was ordained on 8 July 1956. After earning a post-graduate degree from the University of Glasgow in 1960, he was posted to Pakistan.

O'Leary was assigned as a missionary in Rawalpindi, Pakistan. In 1962, while attending to a sick woman in an empty mud hut, O'Leary realized the need for a hospice care facility. In 1964, he opened the first hospice in Rawalpindi. After receiving advice from Mother Teresa, O'Leary obtained loans and donations to establish more facilities. O'Leary established several hospices in Peru, Colombia, Ecuador, Honduras and Guatemala. He also founded three facilities in England.

In 1973, O'Leary was the subject of the British television program This Is Your Life when he was surprised by Eamonn Andrews. He was awarded the 1974 Daniel Carrion Medal for his medical work in Peru. In 1996, O'Leary was awarded an MBE membership.

O'Leary died on 4 October 2000, at the age of 69.

The leader of England's Roman Catholics, Archbishop Vincent Nichols was a cousin of Father O'Leary, and is current president of the Jospice organisation.
