= The Southern Cross (South Australia) =

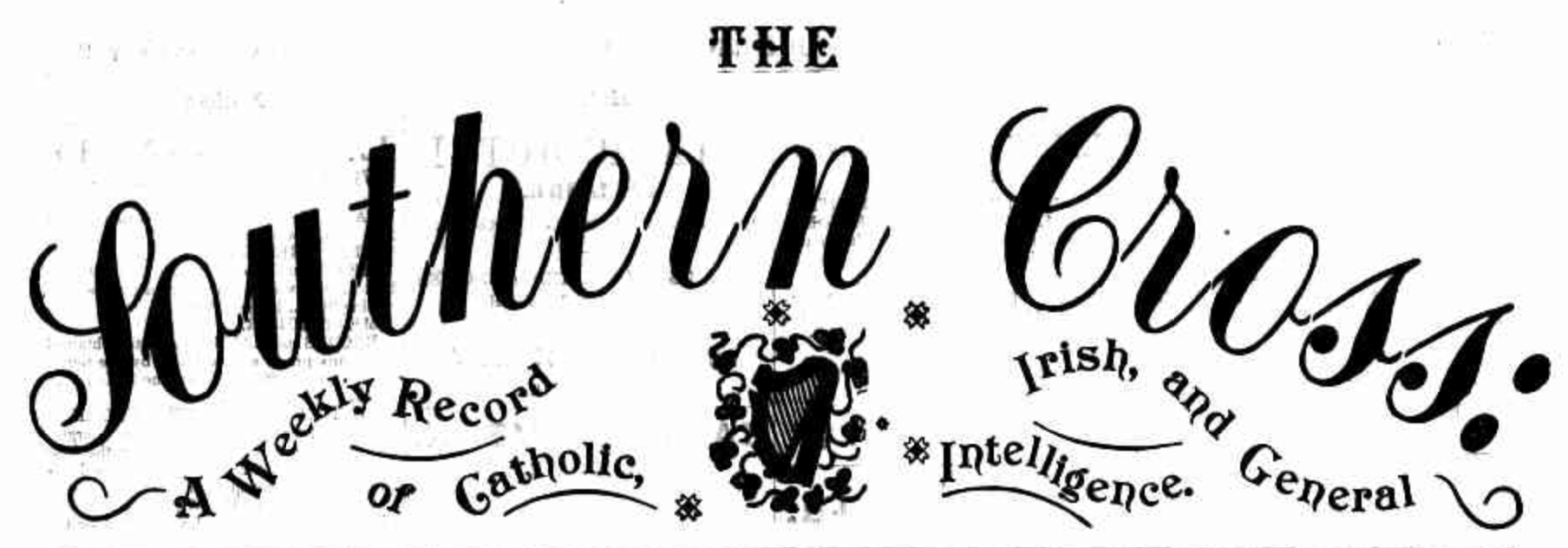
- The original banner of The Southern Cross
- Type: Weekly newspaper
- Owner(s): Southern Cross Printing and Publishing Company
- Founded: July 1889
- City: Adelaide
- Country: Australia

The Southern Cross is the official publication of the Catholic Archdiocese of Adelaide. About 5000 copies are printed monthly and distributed to parishes, schools and agencies, besides an online version. It began in July 1889 as a weekly magazine published in Adelaide, South Australia, for the Catholic Archdiocese of Adelaide, and remained a weekly for most of its history. Its banner was subtitled A weekly record of Catholic, Irish and General Intelligence, and later Organ of the Catholic Church in South Australia. The current, non-print website version of the magazine also bears the name Southern Cross.

== History ==
Two earlier Irish Catholic newspapers, The Irish Harp and Farmers' Herald (1869–1873) and its successor The Harp and Southern Cross (1873–1875), were published in Adelaide weekly until the end of 1875. The publisher was John Augustine Hewitt at 39 King William Street, and printer was Webb, Vardon and Pritchard of Hindley Street. The Irish Harp and Farmers' Herald and its editor C. J. Fox were notable for their trenchant criticism of Bishop Sheil's excommunication of Mary MacKillop.

The Southern Cross (subtitled: A Weekly Record of Catholic, Irish, and General News) was initiated on 5 July 1889 by the Southern Cross Printing and Publishing Company, with the aim of publishing news about and for the Catholic community. It succeeded The Catholic Monthly, a magazine published by Archbishop C. A. Reynolds (1834–1893) and from which he was "anxious to be relieved". The original board of management consisted of Archdeacon Russell (chairman), the Rev. G. Williams, Hon. James O'Loghlin, M.L.C., Dr. O'Connell J.P. and Mr. W. A. Dempsey, J.P. O'Loghlin was appointed managing editor, with an office at 28 Waymouth Street, Adelaide.

The company had been created with the sale of 200 £5 shares. At the following AGM, at which a profit of over 50% was declared and a 10% dividend was distributed to shareholders, Russell, Williams and O'Connell retired and were replaced by Rev. T. F. O'Neill, Rev. P. Jorgensen and Peter Paul Gillen, M.P. At the 1891 AGM a profit was announced, but the meeting resolved that, rather than give a dividend to shareholders, the cover price of the paper should be reduced. The board remained unchanged. At the 1892 AGM another satisfactory report was read; the cover price had been dropped, circulation and advertising were up, and a dividend was distributed to shareholders. Similar results were announced in the ensuing five years, despite a country-wide depression which was affecting South Australia in particular.

O'Loghlin resigned as editor in 1896, but continued as manager and secretary of Southern Cross Printing and Publishing until 1915, when his duties in the Senate and involvement with the war effort made his continuing involvement impossible; he died of tuberculosis after a long period of ill-health, in 1925. Later editors include Matthew Abraham, who had a long career as a radio presenter with ABC Radio Canberra then ABC Radio Adelaide. It continues to be published in print and online. The current editor is Jenny Brinkworth, a former journalist with The Advertiser.

== Archives ==
The Harp and Southern Cross have been digitised by the National Library of Australia as part of the Australian Newspapers Digitisation Project.

- Harp and Southern Cross (Adelaide, SA : 1873–1875) at Trove
- Southern Cross (Adelaide, SA : 1889–1954) at Trove

== See also ==
- The Advocate (Melbourne)
- The Record (Perth)
- The Catholic Leader (Brisbane)
- Freeman's Journal (Sydney)
