= Leary (surname) =

Leary is an Irish surname and may refer to:

- King Leary or Lóegaire mac Néill, an Irish king
- Annie Leary, an American philanthropist and Papal Countess
- Arthur Leary, an American merchant
- Denis Leary (frequently misspelled as 'Dennis Leary'), an American actor, comedian, writer and film director
- Dennis Leary, an American restaurateur
- Devin Leary (born 1999), American football player
- Josephine Leary (1856–1923), American real estate entrepreneur
- Lewis Sheridan Leary, a participant in John Brown's raid on Harpers Ferry
- Michael Leary, an association football player for Barnet F.C.
- Paul Leary, an American musician and record producer
- Richard P. Leary, US Navy admiral in the Spanish–American War
- Thomas B. Leary (1931–2021), American attorney
- Timothy Leary, an American psychologist, writer and counterculture icon
- Warren D. Leary, American politician

== See also ==
- Leary (disambiguation)
- O'Leary (surname)
- King Lear
