= William Howe (mayor) =

William Howe (c. 1864 – 17 May 1952) was an English-born businessman and newspaperman in Port Melbourne, Australia.

== History ==
Howe was born either in Manchester or London, the second son of Samuel Howe, industrialist, and grew up in Southgate, London, and became manager of the Queen Victoria Street, London, branch of Howe Machine Co. Ltd., makers of sewing machines.

He came to Port Melbourne around 1887 and shortly joined the staff of the Port Melbourne Tribune, of which he later became editor. The newspaper was absorbed by The Port Melbourne Standard in 1894.

He lost heavily in the 1893 recession that followed the land boom, and briefly found employment in the Victorian Government Agriculture Department, after which he opened an estate agency.

=== Councillor and mayor ===
Howe was first elected to the Port Melbourne Council in 1900, and apart from a brief forced retirement when he took a Government appointment, remained a councillor until 1946. He served five terms as mayor, including the year of the visit of the then Duke and Duchess of York, and was a member of the party that farewelled them from Victoria. Howe was responsible for establishment of the gardens along the Port Melbourne Railway, opened by Sir Thomas Bent in 1906. He officially opened the first house in Garden City, the local Baby Health Centre, the annexe to the Town Hall that became the Lending Library, and the statue to G. S. Walter.

=== Other interests ===
Howe was a member of the Foresters friendly society and a prominent Mason. He was a special officer of the Children's Court, and returning officer for the Legislative Assembly. Howe and his wife were prominent members of Holy Trinity Church, Port Melbourne, where Mrs Howe was secretary of the Ladies' Benevolent Society.

== Family ==
Howe married Isabella Mary Dando ( – 9 February 1948), eldest daughter of Henry Dando, on 26 September 1891. The Dando family were pioneers from when Port Melbourne was known as Sandridge, and Howe and his wife lived in her family's historic home. This may have been 151 Graham Street, Port Melbourne, the last residence of both William and Isabella Howe. Their children were Anne, Charles, Ethel ("Evie") and Isabel.
