= Richard O'Leary =

American politician

Member of New Hampshire House of Representatives for Hillsborough 13
- In office 2016–2018
- Succeeded by: Kathy Desjardin

Personal details
- Party: Democratic

Richard O'Leary is an American politician. He was a member of the New Hampshire House of Representatives and represented the Hillsborough 13th district.

O'Leary is a former deputy chief of the Manchester Police Department and an opponent of the death penalty.
