= Walter-Patrice O'Leary =

Canadian journalist and political activist

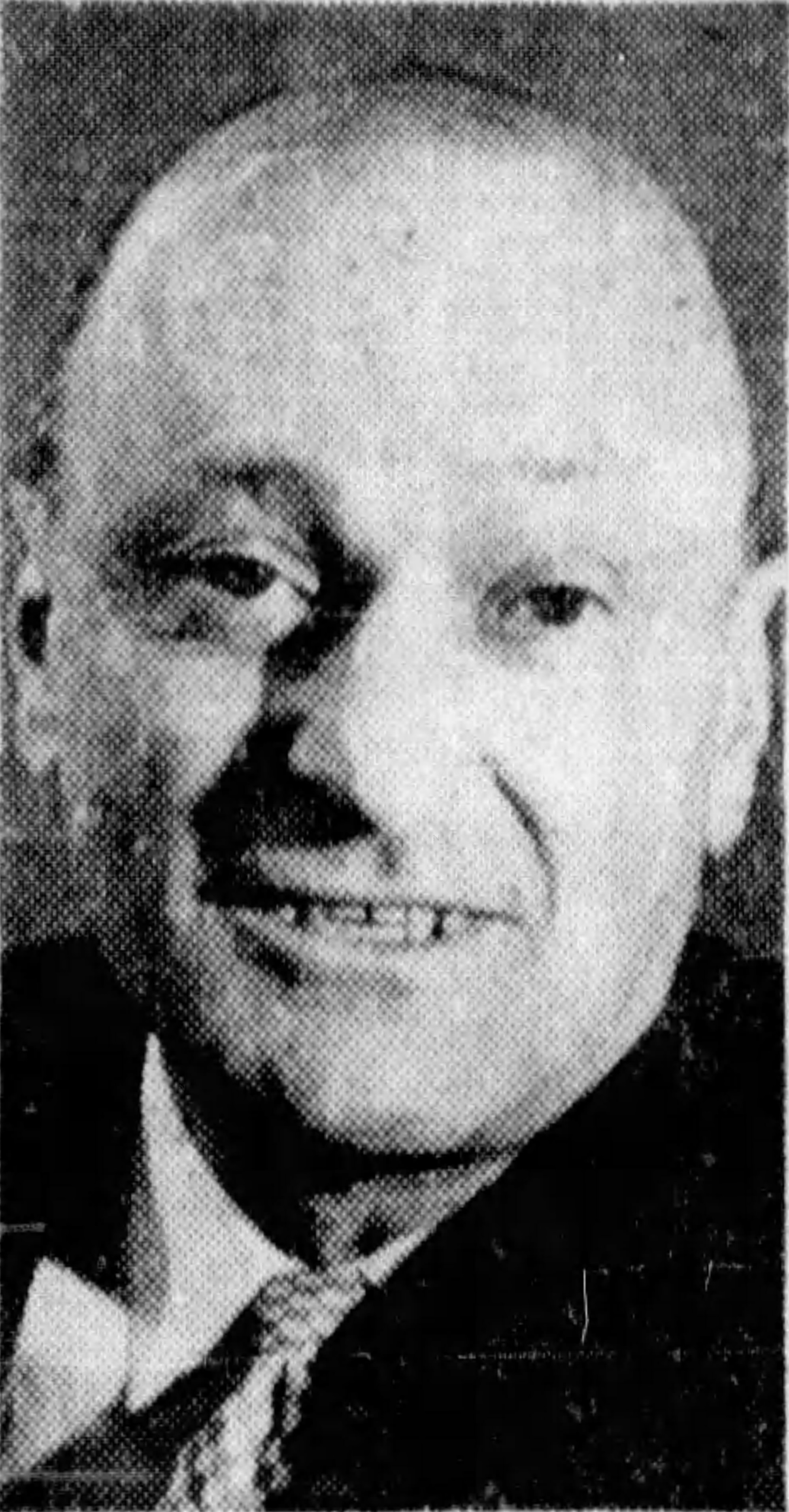
- O'Leary in a Montreal Star article in 1966
- Born: 3 July 1910; Berthierville, Quebec, Canada
- Died: 13 September 1989 (aged 79); Montreal, Quebec, Canada
- Spouse: Gratia Parent
- Parent(s): Émile O'Leary; Fébronie Dostaler

Walter-Patrice O'Leary (3 July 1910 – 13 September 1989) was a Canadian journalist, political activist and trade unionist.

== Biography ==
O'Leary was born in Berthierville, Quebec on 3 July 1910. He attended the Collège Saint-Joseph in Berthierville before travelling to Belgium to study at a Roman Catholic seminary in Wavre. Later, he attended the Institut supérieur de commerce Saint-Louis in Brussels, where he earned a license in commercial sciences, and completed licenses in consular and maritime sciences at the Institut Saint-Ignace in Antwerp. O'Leary also studied at the École Libre des Sciences Politiques in Paris and the National Autonomous University of Mexico (Mexico City), where he earned a license in philosophy and a Master of Arts in Spanish.

While in Europe, O'Leary was vice president of the Foyer international des étudiants catholiques (France) and a member of the Mission universitaire catholique française and the Jeunesse universitaire catholique. In 1931, he founded the Action politique internationale des universitaires catholiques (Belgique). After returning from Europe, he became a journalist for L'Ordre.

=== Activism ===
O'Leary was a Quebec nationalist. With his brother Émile-Dostaler, he co-founded the Young Patriots of French Canada (French: Jeunesses patriotes du Canada français) and the Knights of the Round Table of Canada (French: Chevaliers de la table ronde du Canada) in 1935, and the Cultural Union of Mexico–French Canada (French: Union culturelle Mexique-Canada français), which was later renamed the Union of Latin America (French: Union des Latins d'Amérique), in 1939. Also in 1939, he founded the Bureau de liaison Paris-Montréal.

Circa 1947, O'Leary was secretary of the Goodwill Mission Canada–Mexico (French: Mission de bonne entente Canada-Mexique). He served as president of the Quebec Popular Movement for Human Rights (French: Mouvement populaire québécois des droits de l'Homme) from 1966 to 1967, when he founded Quebec International (French: Québec inter-national). From 1968 to 1970, O'Leary was involved in efforts to disseminate and promote "La marche du Québec" (English: The March of Quebec), a Québécois patriotic song (see Music of Quebec). Subsequently, he was president of The Plateau in Montreal from 1974 to 1975. O'Leary served as secretary of the Parti Québécois' committee on international politics from 1976 to 1976 and was a member of the Saint-Jean-Baptiste Society's committee on international relations.

In the Quebec general election of 1966, O'Leary stood as a candidate for the Rassemblement pour l'Indépendance Nationale in the Notre-Dame-de-Grâce riding. He placed fourth in the contest with 949 votes, losing to Quebec Liberal Eric Kierans.

O'Leary published articles in various French-language magazines and newspapers, including L'Indépendance, L'Ordre, and L'Unité.

=== Personal life ===
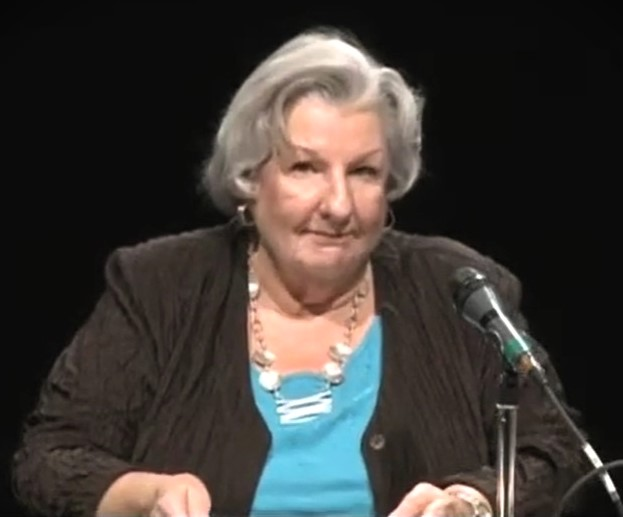
Gratia O'Leary in 2011

O'Leary was born to Emile O'Leary and Fébronie Dostaler and had two sisters—Marguerite and Alice—and a brother, Émile-Dostaler.

He married Gratia Parent on 23 January 1960, at the age of 49. He fathered two children: Christian and Pascal.

=== Death ===
O'Leary died on 13 September 1989 in Montreal, aged 79.
