= André Laurendeau =

Canadian politician

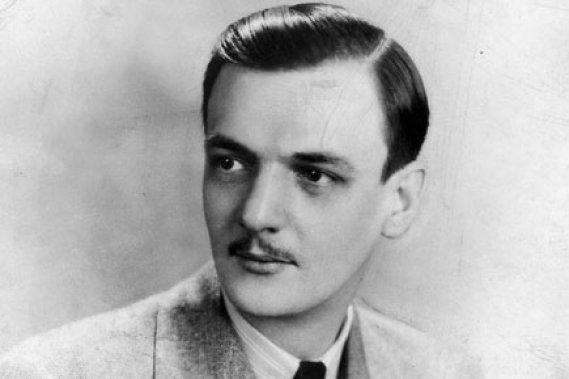
- André Laurendeau
- Born: Joseph-Edmond-André Laurendeau; March 21, 1912; Montreal, Quebec, Canada
- Died: June 1, 1968 (aged 56); Ottawa, Ontario, Canada
- Occupations: Journalist, politician, and playwright

Joseph-Edmond-André Laurendeau (French pronunciation: [ʒozɛf ɛdmɔ̃ ɑ̃dʁe lɔʁɑ̃do]; March 21, 1912 – June 1, 1968) was a journalist, politician, co-chair of the Royal Commission on Bilingualism and Biculturalism, and playwright in Quebec, Canada. He is usually referred to as André Laurendeau. He was active in Québécois life, in various spheres and capacities, for three decades. Laurendeau's career also "spanned the most turbulent periods in the history of Canada".

== Early life ==
André Laurendeau was born March 21, 1912, into a 'notable' Québécois family. He was the only child of Blanche Hardy and Arthur Laurendeau. Theirs was a very musically and politically oriented home, and also a very Catholic atmosphere. His father Arthur was an ardent nationalist and Laurendeau grew up admiring people such as the founder of Le Devoir, Henri Bourassa, and the Catholic nationalist historian Abbé Lionel Groulx. Laurendeau graduated from Collège Sainte-Marie in 1931. Due to a bout with depression, Laurendeau did not pursue a university degree immediately thereafter. The fact that he reached young adulthood as the Great Depression struck naturally influenced his social views.

Starting in 1933, Laurendeau and several friends from the University of Montréal founded a neo-nationalist, separatist movement called "Jeune-Canada". They advocated for the establishment of "Laurentie", a homeland for French Canadians. While a member of Jeune-Canada, Laurendeau helped organize and spoke at a protest rally titled "Politicians and Jews". It was held in response to a protest against anti-Semitism in Germany held in Montreal, both rallies taking place in 1933. Laurendeau questioned the validity of the charges of maltreatment against Jewish peoples in Germany. He also described Jewish peoples' ability to make their political weight felt as a cohesive unit. While claiming not to be anti-Semitic throughout their political career, Jeune-Canada's message of hatred was debated openly in the newspaper Le Devoir, and it was not until the death of Hitler that the group died down. In 1963 Laurendeau wrote an article in the French edition of Maclean's magazine, which essentially denounced this period of his life as ignorant, youthful passion.

== Career ==
In 1935 he left Quebec with his spouse to study philosophy and social sciences at the Sorbonne. After studying abroad, Laurendeau relinquished his separatist persuasion and began to be more preoccupied with the American threat to French-Canadian culture than with that threat posed by English Canada. Upon returning home, he served as director of the L'Action nationale magazine from 1937 to 1943 and from 1949 to 1953, which had been under his father's direction in the past. As a journalist and editorialist, Laurendeau broached a myriad of topics, from nationalism, to World War II, to federalism, to separatism and bilingualism/biculturalism, but always from essentially the same platform. Laurendeau subscribed to tenets of Christian humanism throughout his long career. He was concerned for the good of the collective and ever suspicious of those who wished to concentrate power in the hands of the few. Additionally, Laurendeau believed that even though Quebec constituted a minority in Canada, their position as a unique province with a unique culture were to be respected and not undermined by a central (majority/anglophone/Protestant) power based in Ottawa.

In 1942, Laurendeau entered into politics in opposition to conscription, as a member of the Ligue pour la défense du Canada. His primary reason for doing so was that Prime Minister Mackenzie King had promised conscription would not become national policy, only to put a plebiscite to Canadians to determine whether or not he might revoke his promise and retain their favour. Laurendeau later took part in the founding of the centre-left party Bloc populaire Canadien, and soon became its provincial leader while Maxime Raymond was its federal leader. Laurendeau was a Member of the Legislative Assembly of Quebec (MNA) from 1944 to 1948 in Montréal-Laurier electoral district.

In 1947, Laurendeau became associate editor-in-chief of Le Devoir and, in 1957, became its editor-in-chief. As editor, he was known first for his battles against Maurice Duplessis and later as a leading spokesman for the rising national identity of Quebec during the Quiet Revolution. His editorial column of November 18, 1958, Maurice Duplessis à l'Assemblée nationale: la théorie du roi nègre ("Maurice Duplessis at the National Assembly: the theory of the negro king") was widely cited by Quebecers of all political stripes for years afterwards. This piece compared the status of Duplessis in Quebec in Canada to that of an indigenous ruler in an imperial colony, the parallel being that violations of civil rights and liberties, perpetrated by Duplessis, were tolerated by English Canadians. In the colonial case, the same would hold true even though such violations would not be tolerated by colonists in their imperial lands of origin.

Laurendeau is known for having popularized the word "joual". From 1953 to 1961, he was the host of the television show Pays et Merveilles broadcast by Radio-Canada.

From 1963 until his death, Laurendeau served as co-chair, along with Davidson Dunton, of the Royal Commission on Bilingualism and Biculturalism, a position that brought him considerable criticism from his nationalist colleagues. The stress caused by this criticism was blamed for Laurendeau's relatively early death by historian Charles Godin.

In many of his publications, Laurendeau attached particular importance to the education and future of youth. Schools were named in his honour in Saint-Hubert, in LaSalle, and in Ottawa (this Franco-Ontarian school closed in 1999 and was later converted into a primary school).

== Works ==
- L'abbé Lionel Groulx, 1939
- Voyages au pays de l'enfance (récits) (1960)
- La crise de la conscription 1942 (essai) (1962)
- Une vie d'enfer (roman) (1965)
- Ces choses qui nous arrivent. Chronique des années 1961-1966 (1970)
- Théâtre (1970)
- Journal tenu pendant la Commission royale d'enquête sur le bilinguisme et le biculturalisme (1990), The Diary of André Laurendeau: Written during the Royal Commission on Bilingualism and Biculturalism 1964-67, 1991

== Biographies ==
"Biography". Dictionnaire des parlementaires du Québec de 1792 à nos jours (in French). National Assembly of Quebec.

Bouvier, Félix. André Laurendeau, LIDEC, Montréal, 1996. Horton, Donald. André Laurendeau, French-Canadian Nationalist, 1912-1968, Oxford University Press, Toronto, 1992. Laurendeau, André in Ramsay Cook & Michael Behiels, Eds.The Essential Laurendeau, Copp Clark Publishing, Toronto, 1976.
