= Émile-Dostaler O'Leary =

Canadian journalist and writer

- Born: 16 August 1908; Berthierville, Quebec, Canada
- Died: 18 April 1965 (aged 56); Paris, France
- Occupation: Journalist
- Employer(s): La Patrie, Air France, Canadian Broadcasting Corporation
- Spouse(s): Lucille Lévesque; 4 children
- Parent(s): Émile O'Leary; Fébronie Dostaler

Émile-Dostaler O'Leary (16 August 1908 – 18 April 1965) was a Canadian journalist and writer.

== Biography ==
Émile-Dostaler O'Leary was born in Berthierville, Quebec and attended the Collège Saint-Joseph in Berthierville before travelling to Belgium to study at the "Petit Séminaire de Basse-Wavre" and, later, the University of Burgundy (Dijon, France) and Université libre de Bruxelles. He completed a B.Sc. degree in chemistry, physics, and mathematics at the Institut de chimie Meurice.

After returning from Europe, O'Leary completed an internship in the chemical industry from 1933 to 1937. He subsequently pursued journalism and joined La Patrie. He worked at La Patrie until 1957, when he became director of Air France's Department of External Relations—a position he held until 1958. In 1959, he began working as a correspondent for the Canadian Broadcasting Corporation in Paris, where he also served as Canadian correspondent for several French language newspapers.

=== Activism ===
O'Leary was a Quebec nationalist and member of Jeune-Canada. With his brother Walter-Patrice, he co-founded the Young Patriots of French Canada (French: Jeunesses patriotes du Canada français) and the Knights of the Round Table of Canada (French: Chevaliers de la table ronde du Canada) in 1935, and the Cultural Union of Mexico–French Canada (French: Union culturelle Mexique-Canada français), which was later renamed the Union of Latin America (French: Union des Latins d'Amérique), in 1939.

During the Canadian federal election of 1945, he stood as a candidate for the Bloc Populaire Canadien in the Laurier district. He placed second in the contest with 5,145 votes, losing to incumbent Liberal Ernest Bertrand.

O'Leary was a representative to the executive of the International Federation of Journalists and, in 1950, founded the International Francophone Press Union (French: Union internationale de la presse francophone, UPF).

He served as the UPF's president from 1950 to 1955. He also involved himself with the formation of the Canadian Union of French-language Journalists (French: Union canadienne des journalistes de langue française).

=== Personal life ===
O'Leary was born to Émile O'Leary and Fébronie Dostaler and had two sisters—Marguerite and Alice—and a brother, Walter-Patrice. He married Lucille Lévesque on 15 April 1939, at the age of 30. He fathered four children: Marie-France, Denis, Étienne O'Leary, and Véronique. O'Leary died on 18 April 1965 in Paris, aged 56, from undisclosed causes.

== Publications ==
- L'"inferiority complex", 1935 (English translation: The "inferiority complex")
- Séparatisme, doctrine constructive, 1936 (English translation: Separatism: a constructive doctrine)
- Jeunes du Québec et France d'aujourd'hui 1941 (English translation: Youth of Quebec and France today)
- Introduction à l'histoire de l'Amérique latine, 1949 (English translation: Introduction to the history of Latin America)
- Le roman canadien-français : étude historique et critique. Montreal: Le Cercle du Livre de France, 1954. (English translation: The French-Canadian novel: A historical and critical study)
