= P. I. O'Leary =

Australian poet and journalist (1888–1944)

Patrick Ignatius Davit O'Leary (22 March 1888 – 21 July 1944) was an Australian union organiser, journalist and poet.

== History ==
O'Leary was born 1888, in Georgetown, South Australia, the fourth of nine children of Irish-born schoolteacher Daniel James O'Leary (died 6 May 1902) and Susan O'Leary, née Kinnear. The Irish patriot Michael Davitt, who visited Australia in 1895 was said to be his Godfather. Patrick did not walk until 8 years of age on account of a congenital leg deformation, so developed an early love of reading, particularly the adventure stories of Stevenson and Conrad. He eventually learned to walk, and developed a love of cricket (though he needed a runner) and horseriding. The family moved to Port Pirie, from where he once attempted to stowaway to America, but was caught out.

He worked as a clerk for BHP in Whyalla and Broken Hill, where he became involved with the union movement, then became a journalist with the Barrier Miner, learning the trade from the radical H. H. Champion. In 1912, he married Mary Slattery, and moved to Adelaide, where he found employment with The Advertiser. This was around the time of the Great War, and the conscription referendum, on which he campaigned vigorously on the "NO" side, against Advertiser policy, and was sacked. The couple then moved to Melbourne, where he worked for some time in menial jobs and perhaps a publication called Midnight Sun. In 1920 he joined The Advocate, a Catholic weekly, where he remained until his death on 21 July 1944, aged 55 or 56, making significant contributions with literary critiques, book reviews and poems, and briefly served as assistant editor.

He was a member of Louis Esson's Pioneer Players, an amateur company that specialized in Australian plays, and also belonged to Melbourne's Bread and Cheese Club. He was secretary of the Irish Self-Determination League.

== Family ==
O'Leary married Mary Teresa Slattery at the Broken Hill cathedral in 1912. Their son Kevin became a Catholic priest.

O'Leary's brothers John Justin O'Leary (born Peterborough 31 July 1892 – 14 February 1918), and (Humphrey) Emmet O'Leary (born Georgetown 6 May 1886 – 9 March 1918) both enlisted with the First AIF, both killed in action. Their mother, Susan O'Leary, was listed as next of kin. She later became Sue Holland.

== Works ==
- Romance and Other Verses (1921)
- The Bread and Cheese Book (1939)
- Bard in Bondage (1947), an anthology compiled by Joseph O'Dwyer, included several of his essays.

He was a frequent contributor to The Lone Hand, Triad and other periodicals. His poetry was published under several pseudonyms, including "M", "Historicus", "Francis Davitt" and "P.I.O.L." One of his poems was published in December 1944 as R.I.P. by the Irish Press in his memory.
