= Patrick O'Leary (writer) =

American writer (born 1952)

Patrick O'Leary (born September 13, 1952) is an American writer.

== Life and work ==
Born on September 13, 1952, in Saginaw, Michigan, O'Leary's literary works have been recognized and highlighted at Michigan State University in their Michigan Writers Series. He wrote the poem "Nobody Knows It But Me" which was used in the popular 2002 advertising campaign for the Chevrolet Tahoe and read in the commercial by James Garner.

== Works ==
- Door Number Three (1995)
- The Gift (1998) – nominated for the World Fantasy Award
- Other Voices, Other Doors (collection) (2000)
- The Impossible Bird (2002)
- "The Cane" (2007) Published in Postscripts 12
- The Black Heart (2009)
- "51" (2022)
