= John Kelly (bishop) =

Australian Catholic bishop (1915–1987)

The Most Reverend John Kelly
- Auxiliary Bishop Emeritus of Archdiocese of Melbourne
- Archdiocese: Melbourne
- Installed: 21 February 1973
- Term ended: 19 August 1986
- Other post: Titular Bishop of Zucchabar (1972–1987)

Orders
- Ordination: 28 July 1940 at St Patrick's Cathedral, Melbourne by Daniel Mannix
- Consecration: 21 February 1973 at St Patrick's Cathedral, Melbourne by James Robert Knox

Personal details
- Born: John Anthony Kelly; 27 October 1915 South Yarra, Victoria, Australia
- Died: 24 July 1987 (aged 71) Melbourne, Victoria, Australia
- Buried: Melbourne, Victoria, Australia
- Denomination: Catholic Church
- Occupation: Catholic bishop

John Anthony Kelly (27 October 1915 – 24 July 1987) was an Australian bishop of the Catholic Church. He served as Auxiliary Bishop of Melbourne for 13 years.

== Early life ==
Kelly was born in South Yarra, the son of John and Teresa Kelly. He received his early education at the Convent of Our Lady of Mercy, Heidelberg, before moving to Cathedral College, East Melbourne (also known as Christian Brothers College) and then Good Samaritan Convent, Canberra. He studied for a brief time at Rockwell College in Ireland before concluding his studies at St Kevin's College, Toorak. He began his studies for priesthood at Corpus Christi College, Melbourne.

== Priesthood ==
Kelly was ordained on 28 July 1940 at St Patrick's Cathedral, Melbourne by Archbishop Daniel Mannix along with 13 other priests.

== Episcopate ==
On 16 November 1972, Kelly was appointed Auxiliary Bishop of Melbourne by Pope Paul VI along with Eric Gerard Perkins and Thomas Francis Little. The trio were consecrated as bishops on 21 February 1973 at St Patrick's Cathedral, Melbourne by Archbishop James Robert Knox during the International Eucharistic Congress in Melbourne.

== Death ==
Kelly resigned as Auxiliary Bishop of Melbourne on 19 August 1986. He died less than a year later on 24 July 1987 at the age of 71.

Catholic Church titles
Preceded by –	Auxiliary Bishop of Melbourne; 1973–1986	Succeeded by –
Preceded by Nicolas Kinsch	Titular Bishop of Zucchabar; 1972–1987	Succeeded by João Maria Messi
