= Raheen, Kew =

Heritage-listed mansion in Melbourne, Victoria, Australia

Raheen
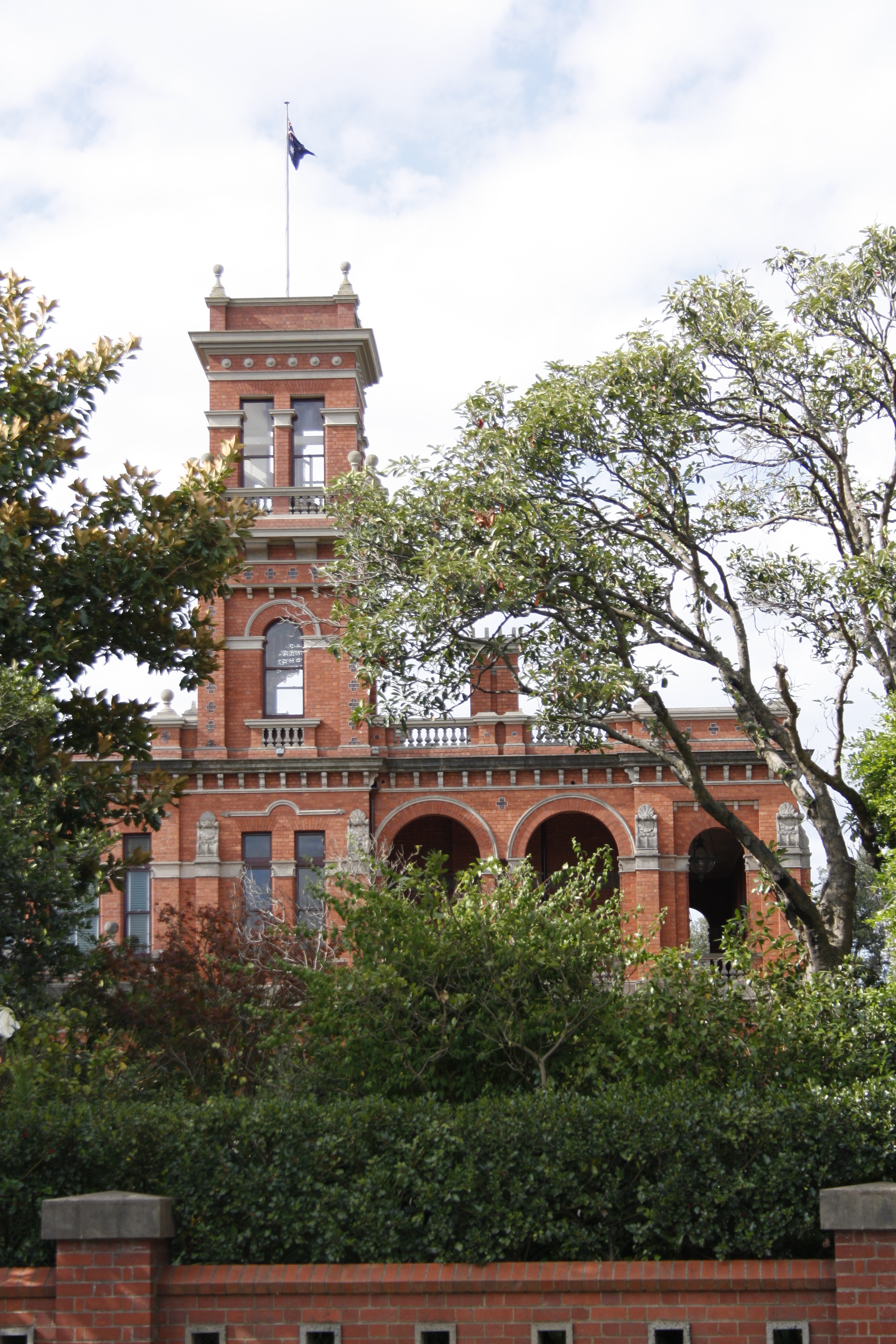
- Raheen [1] mansion, viewed from the street

- Location within Melbourne
- Etymology: Gaelic: little fort

General information
- Status: Completed
- Type: Residential estate incorporating a mansion
- Architectural style: Victorian Italianate (1885); Contemporary (2019)
- Location: Kew, Melbourne, Victoria, Australia
- Coordinates: 37°48′19″S 145°01′00″E
- Year built: 1870–1885 (Raheen 1)
- Completed: 1885; 141 years ago
- Renovated: c. 1993 (Raheen 2); 2019 (Raheen 3)
- Client: Edward Latham
- Owner: Edward Latham (1870–c. 1888); Sir Henry Wrixon (c. 1889–1917); Roman Catholic Archdiocese of Melbourne (1917–1981); Pratt family {since 1981)

Technical details
- Material: Bricks; cement render; cast iron; glass
- Floor count: 2; plus 4-storey tower

Design and construction
- Architect: William Salway
- Other designers: Egidio Lunardon (garden)

Renovating team
- Architect: Glen Murcutt (c. 1993)
- Renovating firm: Bates Smart McCutcheon (c. 1993); Bates Smart (2019)
- Other designers: Jane Dennithorne (garden)
- Main contractor: Kane Constructions (c. 1993); Krongold Constructions (2019)
- Awards: RAIA: Residential Architecture – Houses (Alterations and Additions), 2023 (2019)

Victorian Heritage Register
- Official name: Raheen
- Type: Registered place
- Designated: 14 July 1982
- Reference no.: VHR H0515
- Heritage overlay no.: HO128
- Category: Residential buildings (private)

Register of the National Estate
- Official name: Raheen
- Type: Defunct register
- Designated: undated
- Reference no.: 14969

Raheen is a private residential estate located at 94 Studley Park Road in Kew, an inner eastern suburb of Melbourne, Victoria, Australia. Within the estate, there are three separate and integrated residences; Raheen 1 is the heritage-listed Italianate mansion, a solid brick house that was built between 1870 and 1885; Raheen 2 is a voluminous and lightly framed structure, completed in c. 1993; and Raheen 3 is a floating glass and steel Contemporary-styled pavilion, completed in 2019.

The estate draws its name from the Gaelic, meaning "little fort". Raheen 1 is a previous residence of leading businessmen and several Roman Catholic Archbishops of Melbourne, the Raheen estate has been owned by members of the Pratt family since 1981, and Raheen 3 is the principal Australian residence of Anthony Pratt.

Built on the traditional lands of the Wurundjeri people, the mansion (Raheen 1) was added to the Victorian Heritage Register on 14 July 1982, in recognition of its historical and architectural significance; and was also added to non-statutory lists by the Victorian branch of the National Trust on 9 April 1981 and the now defunct Register of the National Estate on an unknown date. Several trees located on and adjacent to the estate, believed to have been planted in the c. 1880s by Sir Henry Wrixon, were also added to a non-statutory list by the National Trust.

== History ==
=== Mansion ===
==== Establishment by Edward Latham ====
The construction of Raheen commenced in 1870, with an extension added in 1884. It was designed by William Salway and built for Edward Latham, founder of the Carlton Brewery, whose daughter, Bertha, married William Lawrence Baillieu in 1861.

Entrance gates to the estate

Raheen was constructed as a two-storey house in the Italianate style, with a four-storey tower over the entrance and single-storey extension. It was designed in an asymmetric and arcaded form, and is built of red brick with cement render. The property retains its garden layout, including an Italianate garden, outbuildings, fence and gates, and internal features including the original stairwell, library, ballroom and cast iron tower stairs. Raheen is architecturally important in exhibiting an unusual integration of features in the combination of red brick and cement rendering. The house is architecturally important in exhibiting good design and aesthetic characteristics of the Italianate style, as well as in internal features and garden design.

==== Wrixon family ownership ====
Sir Henry Wrixon KCMG QC, a prominent Melbourne barrister and solicitor, and his wife, Lady Charlotte – a daughter of the Hon. Henry "Money" Miller MLC – owned and resided at Raheen from c. 1889. After Sir Henry's death in 1915, Lady Wrixon remained at Raheen until 1917, described at the time as:

"Raheen is a beautiful, roomy home, overlooking the heights of Kew, with Melbourne in the distance. The terrace garden is most picturesque, and formed a beautiful setting many… a time to a garden party during the life of Sir Henry Wrixon… The ground floor of the interior includes a large reception-room and dining-room, both open into the garden. There is a smaller drawing-room, and a fine music-room, fitted with a very good organ."

— The Australasian, 18 August 1917.

==== Roman Catholic Archdiocese of Melbourne ownership ====
By July 1917, the Roman Catholic Archdiocese of Melbourne had purchased both Raheen and an adjacent property, Studley Hall, (Note: Despite multiple media reports that the Church had purchased Studley Hall, sometimes referred to as "Studley House", a former residence of Carl Pinschof, the property was purchased by the Victorian Government in 1918 for the purposes of establishing a venereal hospital. However, in the face of local community opposition to the hospital, the government sold Studley Hall in 1920 to T. M. Burke, a Catholic businessman, who gifted the property to Xavier College, for the purposes of establishing a preparatory school at what is now known as part of the Burke Hall campus of Xavier College.) with the intention of converting the latter into a Catholic girls' school and Raheen as the official residence of the Archbishop of Melbourne. At the time, the archbishop was Dr Daniel Mannix, and he would daily walk to and from St Patrick's Cathedral, in the Melbourne city centre. Following Mannix's death in 1963, Raheen was the official residence for Archbishops Justin Simonds, James Cardinal Knox, and Sir Frank Little KBE. In 1981, the Church sold the Raheen estate.

The period of the Church's ownership of Raheen illustrated the status sought by church hierarchy for Melbourne's Catholics and the Church prior to the mid-twentieth century. Raheen, as Archbishop Mannix's official residence, was significant due to Mannix's influence within the Melbourne Archdiocese and in Melbourne politics, particularly during the conscription debates of World War I; his opposition to the Industrial Workers of the World and the Communist Party of Australia; and his support of Joseph Lyons as Prime Minister of Australia.

==== Pratt family ownership ====
Raheen was purchased for reportedly A$2 million in 1981 by the Australian businessman Richard Pratt and his family. Pratt and his wife, Jeanne Pratt AC, extensively renovated and restored the mansion and gardens, and reportedly spent approximately $10 million, as of 1999. In the same year, it was reported that Richard Pratt wished to bequeath Raheen to the Victorian Government. However, the Kennett government rejected the offer unless it included a gift of $1 million to sustain the upkeep of the house. Pratt dismissed the counter offer.

During the Pratt's ownership, the house and gardens have been occasionally opened for charitable events; and both Katy Perry and Kylie Minogue have performed at private events in the estate.

=== Additional dwellings ===
The Pratt family have added two additional dwellings to the site. A modern family wing was designed by Glen Murcutt in c. 1993, in conjunction with Bates Smart McCutcheon, called Raheen 2.

Following Richard Pratt's death in 2009, his son, Anthony, in 2016 initiated renovations to the estate. He commissioned the addition of a contemporary pavilion-style dwelling, designed by Bates Smart architects, called Raheen 3; that won the national category for Residential Architecture – Houses (Alterations and Additions), awarded by the Australian Institute of Architects in 2023.

Prior to the construction of Raheen 3, the estate was assessed as having an approximate value of A$100 million.

== See also ==
- Architecture of Melbourne
- List of places on the Victorian Heritage Register in the City of Boroondara
