= Hilton Deakin =

Australian Roman Catholic prelate (1932–2022)

The Most Reverend Hilton Deakin AM
- Auxiliary Bishop Emeritus of Melbourne
- Archdiocese: Melbourne
- Appointed: 30 December 1992
- Installed: 3 March 1993
- Term ended: 13 November 2007
- Other post: Titular Bishop of Murthlacum (1992–2022)

Orders
- Ordination: 27 July 1958 at St Patrick's Cathedral, Melbourne by Justin Daniel Simonds
- Consecration: 3 March 1993 at St Patrick's Cathedral, Melbourne by Thomas Francis Little

Personal details
- Born: Hilton Forrest Deakin; 13 November 1932 Seymour, Victoria, Australia
- Died: 28 September 2022 (aged 89) Balwyn, Victoria, Australia
- Education: Corpus Christi College, Melbourne; Monash University

Hilton Forrest Deakin AM (13 November 1932 – 28 September 2022) was an Australian Roman Catholic prelate who served as Auxiliary Bishop of Melbourne for 15 years and was appointed a Member of the Order of Australia (AM) for his service to the international community, particularly the people of East Timor.

== Early life ==
Born in Seymour, Victoria, to Arthur and Ruby Deakin. Three of his brothers died before the age of three, leaving him as the eldest of three siblings: two sisters and a brother. One of his sisters joined the Sisters of the Good Samaritan. He grew up in Finley in the Riverina region of New South Wales after being forced to sell their farm due to economic hardship.

He received his primary education from the Sisters of Mercy at St Joseph's Catholic School in Finley and then later at Our Lady of Lourdes, Thornbury when the family moved to Melbourne during the war years. There, one of the teachers discovered he could sing with perfect pitch and encouraged him to audition for the Cathedral Choir. He was successful and earned a scholarship to St Patrick's College, East Melbourne, and then at Parade College, Melbourne. He graduated from Parade College in 1950.

Deakin credited his early life with shaping his ministry, witnessing the hardships his family faced and growing up in a community with Aboriginal families living alongside them. It sparked a deep interest and respect towards Aboriginal people and gave him a sense of solidarity towards people on the margins. During high school, he became interested in Catholic Social Teaching. He would sell the Catholic Worker on the steps of Flinders Street Station on Saturday morning, visit the sick and elders, helped the parish deliver food parcels and even mounted a soap box at Yarra Bend Park tospeak on behalf of the Catholic Evidence Guild.

In 1951, he entered Corpus Christi College, Werribee to begin studies for the priesthood.

== Priesthood ==
Deakin was ordained to the priesthood for the Roman Catholic Archdiocese of Melbourne on 27 July 1958 at St Patrick's Cathedral, Melbourne by Archbishop Justin Simonds.

His first appointment was as an assistant priest at Moonee Ponds before serving at St Patrick's Cathedral, Melbourne in 1963. In 1966, he moved to serve as an assistant priest at Box Hill and then moved to Glen Iris in 1969.

In 1968, Archbishop James Knox invited Deakin to undertake undergraduate studies in anthropology, aware of his interest in Aboriginal affairs and in preparation for the 40th International Eucharistic Congress, to be held in Melbourne in 1973. In 1972, he received a Bachelor of Arts from Monash University and in 1975, took leave from full-time ministry to conduct field work in Western Australia for his doctorate. He received a PhD in Anthropology in 1977, also from Monash University. In 1968, he took a sabbatical year, traveling and working in Europe and Africa.

He returned to full-time ministry in 1979, serving at parish priest of Mount Eliza until 1987. During this same time, he became Chair of the Senate of Priests. In May 1987, he was appointed Vicar General of the Archdiocese of Melbourne. He served in this role until 1992, despite suffering an aneurism shortly after the appointment which forced him to go on leave for some months.

In 1991, while serving as Vicar General, a group of East Timorese asked if a memorial Mass could be celebrations at St Patrick's Cathedral, Melbourne to commemorate the 16th anniversary of the Indonesian invasion of Dili. Just days later, 293 East Timorese people were massacred at a Dili cemetery by Indonesian troops. At Deakin's suggestion, the commemorative Mas became a funeral Mass attended by more than a thousand East Timorese and other supporters. The event sparked the beginning of a long, passionate and personal commitment to the people of East Timor by Deakin.

== Episcopacy ==
On 30 December 1992, Deakin was appointed an Auxiliary Bishop of the Archdiocese of Melbourne and Titular Bishop of Murthlacum. He was consecrated as a bishop on 3 March 1993 by Archbishop Thomas Francis Little in St Patrick's Cathedral, Melbourne. As Auxiliary Bishop, he was responsible for the eastern region of the Archdiocese.

He was appointed a Member of the Order of Australia (AM) in the 2003 Australia Day Honours "for service to the international community, particularly through the Catholic aid agency, Caritas Australia, and to the people of East Timor."

From 1993 to 2006, he held senior roles within Caritas, the Catholic aid agency. He served as Chair of Caritas Australia, President of Caritas Oceania, and then Vice President of Caritas International.

During his episcopacy, he served under three different Archbishops: Archbishop Thomas Francis Little, Archbishop George Pell and Archbishop Denis James Hart.

== Retirement and death ==
On 13 November 2007, Deakin retired as Auxiliary Bishop of the Archdiocese of Melbourne on his 75th birthday, the age of canonical retirement from episcopal ministry.

In 2015, he appeared before the Royal Commission into Institutional Responses to Child Sexual Abuse. He told the commission he didn't refer allegations of child sexual abuse to police, but instead referred the matters to then Archbishop Thomas Francis Little.

Following a brief period of ill-health, Deakin passed away peacefully at his home at Justin Villa, Balwyn on 28 September 2022, aged 89 years.

Catholic Church titles
Preceded by —	Auxiliary Bishop of Melbourne; 1992–2007	Succeeded by —
Preceded by Edmond Carmody	Titular Bishop of Murthlacum; 1992–2022	Succeeded by Richard Adrian Walker
