= Eric Perkins =

Australian Catholic bishop (1916–1987)

The Most Reverend Eric Perkins
- Auxiliary Bishop Emeritus of Archdiocese of Melbourne
- Archdiocese: Melbourne
- Installed: 21 February 1973
- Term ended: 20 August 1991
- Other post: Titular Bishop of Verrona (1972–1998)

Orders
- Ordination: 28 July 1940 at St Patrick's Cathedral, Melbourne by Daniel Mannix
- Consecration: 21 February 1973 at St Patrick's Cathedral, Melbourne by James Robert Knox

Personal details
- Born: Eric Gerard Perkins; 10 July 1916 Prahran, Victoria, Australia
- Died: 27 May 1998 (aged 81) Melbourne, Victoria, Australia
- Buried: Melbourne, Victoria, Australia
- Denomination: Catholic Church
- Occupation: Catholic bishop

Eric Gerard Perkins (10 July 1916 – 27 May 1998) was an Australian bishop of the Catholic Church. He served as Auxiliary Bishop of Melbourne for more than 18 years.

== Early life ==
Perkins was born in Prahran, Victoria to Phillip and Margaret Perkins. He was raised in St Kilda and attended Christian Brothers College, St Kilda and then moved to St Kevin's College, Toorak, before joining the seminary at Corpus Christi College, Melbourne. His brother John also became a priest but died before Perkins was elevated to the episcopate.

== Priesthood ==
Perkins was ordained on 28 July 1940 at St Patrick's Cathedral, Melbourne by Archbishop Daniel Mannix along with 13 other priests.

== Episcopate ==
On 16 November 1972, Perkins was appointed Auxiliary Bishop of Melbourne by Pope Paul VI along with John Anthony Kelly and Thomas Francis Little. The trio were consecrated as bishops on 21 February 1973 at St Patrick's Cathedral, Melbourne by Archbishop James Robert Knox during the International Eucharistic Congress in Melbourne.

== Death ==
Perkins retired at Auxiliary Bishop of Melbourne on 20 August 1991, having reached the canonical retirement age of 75. He died on 27 May 1998.

Catholic Church titles
Preceded by –	Auxiliary Bishop of Melbourne; 1973–1991	Succeeded by –
Preceded by Eugenio Beitia Aldazabal	Titular Bishop of Verrona; 1972–1998	Succeeded by James Francis McCarthy
