= Thinh Xuan Nguyen =

Australian Catholic bishop (born 1973)

The Most Reverend Thinh Xuan Nguyen
- Auxiliary Bishop of Melbourne
- Native name: Gioakim Nguyễn Xuân Thinh
- Church: Catholic
- Archdiocese: Melbourne
- Province: Melbourne
- Appointed: 8 November 2024
- Other post: Titular Bishop of Madaurus

Orders
- Ordination: 16 September 2006 by Denis Hart
- Consecration: 1 February 2025 by Peter Comensoli

Personal details
- Born: 3 January 1973 (age 53) Saigon, South Vietnam
- Denomination: Catholic
- Motto: Confide, vocat te; (Take courage, He is calling you); (Hãy can đảm, Người gọi con)
- Styles
- Reference style: His Lordship; The Most Reverend
- Spoken style: My Lord
- Religious style: Bishop

Joachim Thinh Xuan Nguyen (born 3 January 1973) is an Australian Catholic prelate serving as an auxiliary bishop of the Archdiocese of Melbourne since 2025.

== Early life ==
Nguyễn Xuân Thinh was born on 3 January 1973 in Saigon, then part of South Vietnam. He is the eleventh of nine brothers and four sisters born to Nguyễn Xuân Hạng and Nguyễn Thị Côi (née Phạm). One of his older brothers is also a priest, Joachim Nguyễn Xuân Tiến, SSC, who serves in Japan.

After finishing his primary education at Kết Đoàn Primary School, at the age of thirteen, he and his family arrived in Australia and settled in Melbourne after fleeing Vietnam by boat. He was later enrolled in secondary school at Redden Catholic College, Preston. He obtained a Bachelor of Building Engineering degree from Victoria University and worked for an engineering firm before entering Corpus Christi College Regional Seminary, Carlton, in 1999.

== Presbyteral ministry ==
Nguyen was ordained a deacon on 8 October 2005. He was ordained a priest for the Archdiocese of Melbourne on 16 September 2006 at the Cathedral Basilica of Saint Patrick, by Archbishop Denis Hart. He served in the parish of Deer Park as a curate before being appointed parish priest of Fitzroy. He became a formator at Corpus Christi College Regional Seminary in 2013. He then served as chaplain at the University of Melbourne from 2018 and as assistant vocation director of the archdiocese. In 2020 he became parish priest in Bennettswood.

He holds a master's degree in theological studies and a Master of Arts in spirituality. In 2022, he was appointed coordinator of Clergy, Life and Ministry in the archdiocese.

== Episcopal ministry ==
On 8 November 2024, Pope Francis announced his appointment of Nguyen and Rene Ramirez RCJ as auxiliary bishops of Melbourne. Nguyen expressed his surprise upon receiving the news of his appointment. He commented that he felt overwhelmed by the "responsibility and the weight of the task ahead," but remembered a line from the Gospel of Matthew, which encouraged him to accept this role, "Take heart! It is I! Do not be afraid!" (Note: From Matthew 14:27, "Take heart, it is I; do not be afraid.") The sentiment behind this line was later seen in his episcopal motto, in which he took a similar verse, "Take courage. He’s calling you." (Note: From Mark 10:49, “Take heart; get up, he is calling you.”)

The pair were consecrated as bishops on 1 February 2025 at the Cathedral Basilica of Saint Patrick. The principal consecrator was Archbishop Peter Comensoli while Bishop Gregory Bennet of Sale and Bishop Shane Mackinlay of Sandhurst were co-consecrators. Nguyen serves as auxiliary bishop for the eastern region of the archdiocese.
