= Joseph O'Connell (bishop) =

The Most Reverend Joseph O'Connell
- Auxiliary bishop of Archdiocese of Melbourne
- Archdiocese: Melbourne
- Installed: 31 March 1976
- Term ended: 11 December 2006
- Other post: Titular Bishop of Sanctus Germanus (1976–2013)

Orders
- Ordination: 28 July 1957 at St Patrick's Cathedral, Melbourne by Justin Daniel Simonds
- Consecration: 31 March 1976 at St Patrick's Cathedral, Melbourne by Thomas Francis Little

Personal details
- Born: Joseph Peter O’Connell; 10 December 1931 North Melbourne, Victoria, Australia
- Died: 27 April 2013 (aged 81) Kew, Victoria, Australia
- Denomination: Catholic Church
- Occupation: Catholic bishop
- Education: Pontifical Gregorian University

Joseph Peter O'Connell (10 December 1931 – 27 April 2013) was the Roman Catholic titular bishop of 'Sanctus Germanus' and auxiliary bishop of the Roman Catholic Archdiocese of Melbourne, Australia.

== Early life ==
O'Connell was born on 10 December 1931 in North Melbourne, one of two sons born to Loughlin and May O'Connell. He initially commenced studies for teaching in 1949, but in 1950, entered Corpus Christi College in Werribee to study for the priesthood.

== Priesthood ==
O'Connell was ordained a priest for the Archdiocese of Melbourne on 28 July 1957 at St Patrick's Cathedral, Melbourne by Archbishop Justin Daniel Simonds. He was appointed assistant priest at Geelong West.

In 1958, he was sent to Rome to study canon law at the Pontifical Gregorian University. He lived in St Peter's College, Rome during his years there and obtained his Doctor of Canon Law in July 1961.

He returned to Melbourne and ministered in the parishes of West Melbourne and Yarraville, while also serving on the Archdiocesan Tribunal, becoming vice-officialis in 1968. In 1969, he was appointed Episcopal Vicar for Religious.

== Episcopate ==
On 24 January 1976, Pope Paul VI appointed O'Connell as Auxiliary bishop of Archdiocese of Melbourne and Titular Bishop of Sanctus Germanus. He was consecrated a bishop on 31 March 1976 at St Patrick's Cathedral, Melbourne by Archbishop Thomas Francis Little.

As Auxiliary Bishop, he was responsible for the Northern Region of the Archdiocese and also served as parish priest of Moonee Ponds. His work as a canonist was also valuable in both the local and national Church. He was a founding life member of the Canon Law Society of Australia and New Zealand.

Having held a desire to become a teacher, he embraced a love for education. He blessed the Coolock Wing of Sacred Heart College, Kyneton when it was opened in 1975. He blessed the Corpus Christi Primary School, Werribee when it opened in 1985. He also blessed St Margaret Mary's School, Brunswick North when it was officially opened at a new campus in 1990.

He was also instrumental in the planning for four Catholic Regional Colleges in West Melbourne, encompassing St Albans, Melton, Sydenham and Caroline Springs.

== Retirement and death ==
On 11 December 2006, he retired from episcopal ministry, having reached the canonical retirement age of 75 a day earlier.

He died peacefully at Caritas Christi, Kew on 27 April 2013, at the age of 81.
