= Terence Curtin =

Australian Catholic clergy

The Most Reverend Terence Curtin
- Bishop Emeritus of Melbourne
- Bishop Curtin
- Church: Roman Catholic Church
- Archdiocese: Melbourne
- See: Melbourne
- Appointed: 7 November 2014
- Installed: 7 October 2019
- Term ended: 31 January 2025

Orders
- Ordination: 28 August 1971 by Archbishop James Knox
- Consecration: 17 December 2014 by Archbishop Denis Hart

Personal details
- Born: Terence Robert Curtin; 20 July 1945 (age 81) Cremorne, Sydney, Australia
- Denomination: Roman Catholic
- Education: St Kevin's College, Melbourne; Corpus Christi College; Pontifical Urban University; Pontifical Gregorian University; University of Melbourne

Styles of Terence Curtin
- Reference style: The Most Reverend
- Spoken style: My Lord
- Religious style: Bishop

Terence Robert Curtin (born 20 July 1945) is a retired Australian prelate of the Catholic Church. He was previously an auxiliary bishop of the Roman Catholic Archdiocese of Melbourne. He was consecrated by Archbishop Denis Hart at St Patrick's Cathedral, Melbourne on 17 December 2014. He retired as an Auxiliary Bishop in January 2025.

== Early life ==
Curtin was born in Cremorne, Sydney on 20 July 1945. His family moved to Melbourne and he was educated at St Kevin's College, in Toorak. He entered seminary at Corpus Christi College, Melbourne in 1964, before moving to Rome to complete his studies at the Pontifical Urban University.

== Priesthood ==
In 1971, he was ordained a priest for the Archdiocese of Melbourne at St Patrick's Cathedral, Melbourne. He served as assistant priest at Noble Park until 1974, when he became assistant priest of Fawkner and chaplain to the General Cemetery of Melbourne.

In 1975, he was appointed chaplain and head of the religious education department at the State College of Victoria, Mercy Campus in Ascot Vale, where he served until 1982. From 1983 until 1986, he completed further studies at Pontifical Gregorian University, Rome, graduating with a Doctorate of Theology. He served as chaplain and head of the School of Religion and Philosophy at the Australian Catholic University, Oakleigh from 1987 to 1992. He did further study at the Weston School of Theology in Boston, USA in 1992.

In 1993, he was appointed head of the School of Religion and Philosophy at the Australian Catholic University, Victoria, serving in the role until 1995. He then became the head of the School of Theology at the university in 1996. In 2003, he became Master of the Catholic Theological College, Melbourne, serving until 2010.

In 2008, he was appointed parish priest of Greythorn. During this time, he also served as vice president and then president of the Melbourne College of Divinity.

In 2012, he was given the title "Monsignor" and appointed Diocesan Consultor and Episcopal Vicar of Melbourne for the Eastern Region.

== Episcopacy ==
On 7 November 2014, Pope Francis announced he had appointed Curtin and Father Mark Edwards OMI as auxiliary bishops for the Archdiocese of Melbourne. Curtin was appointed the titular bishop of Cabarsussi and consecrated a bishop by Archbishop Denis Hart on 17 December 2014.

Catholic Church titles
Preceded by António Manuel Moiteiro Ramos	— TITULAR — Titular Bishop of Cabarsussi; 2014–present	Incumbent
Preceded by	Auxiliary Bishop of Melbourne; 2014–present	Incumbent
