= Victoria Police Academy =

- Type: Police academy
- Established: 1973
- Founder: Victoria Police
- Location: 1 View Mount Road, Glen Waverley, Melbourne, Victoria, Australia; 37°53′29″S 145°10′30″E
- Location within Victoria

The Victoria Police Academy is the main induction training establishment for the Victoria Police. It is located at 1 View Mount Road, in Glen Waverley, in the south-eastern suburbs of Melbourne, Victoria, Australia. The grounds encompass 16 hectares (40 acres).

== History ==
The site was built from 1954 – 59 as the main campus of Corpus Christi College, a seminary of the Roman Catholic Archdiocese of Melbourne, from 1959–1972. The main chapel was intended to have wings of offices and accommodation either side, however only the southern wing was built before the College was sold.

The Victoria Police bought the site on 30 October 1972, and opened the Academy in 1973. Offices occupy the former seminarians rooms; the former kitchen and dining room now serve the current Academy. Additional buildings for instruction and student accommodation, sports facilities and a gymnasium and indoor swimming pool, were erected in the 1980s, and a mock village was added later for scenario training purposes.

== Training ==
Newly inducted recruits spend 31 weeks at the Academy. In 2004 an inquiry uncovered systemic bullying and the head and two other staff were transferred out of the Academy.

The Academy also houses the Detective Training School (DTS) used for training of detectives. There is also obstacle equipment and fields where the Dog Squad often train.

=== Academy facility upgrade ===
In order to increase the Academy’s capacity to accommodate the training of an additional 1700 police and 940 PSOs by November 2014, A$15.4 million was provided to Victoria Police to upgrade the Victoria Police Academy in 2013-14. The significant works included:

- an operational tactics and safety training complex with a new firing range, a ‘soft fall’ area for conducted energy device and defensive tactics training, and a simulator, for firearm and operational safety training
- a new training system, called Hydra, which simulates a variety of operational scenarios, ranging from vehicle intercepts to large-scale criminal investigations and emergencies, such as bushfires
- a railway platform for PSO training, new classrooms for training, improvements to bathroom and change room facilities, a dining room upgrade and extra car parking space.

=== New operational tactics and safety training facility ===
Construction of a new police training facility alongside the new Victorian Emergency Management Training Centre in Craigieburn commenced in 2013–14. The now complete A$30 million Victoria Police facility replaced a facility located at Essendon Fields.

The Craigieburn complex will house administration and training staff and include an indoor firing range, scenario training village, classrooms, an auditorium, conference centre and fitness facilities. Police can undertake compulsory training twice a year at either this facility, the Victoria Police Academy or other locations in country Victoria depending on location.

== Chapel ==
Victoria Police Academy Memorial Chapel
- Corpus Christi Chapel (former)
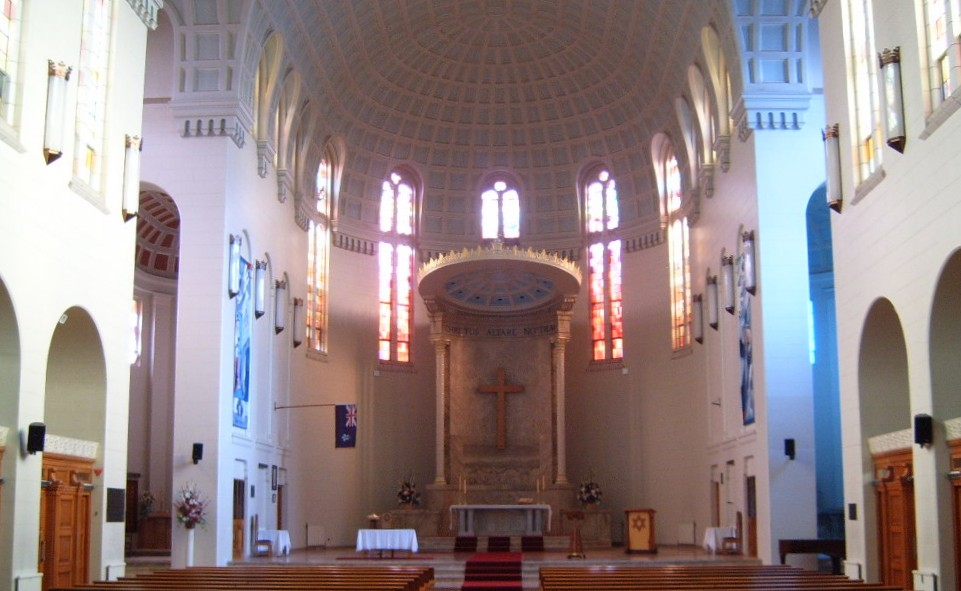
- Former Corpus Christi Chapel, now an interfaith chapel
- Victoria Police Academy Memorial Chapel
- Address: View Mount Road, Police Academy, Glen Waverley, Victoria
- Country: Australia
- Denomination: Interfaith
- Previous denomination: Roman Catholic

History
- Status: Chapel
- Founded: 1954 (as Corpus Christi College)
- Founder: Archbishop Daniel Mannix
- Dedication: Members of Victoria Police killed in the line of duty
- Dedicated: 20 October 1974; and; 13 November 1988 by Chaplains of Victoria Police

Architecture
- Style: Byzantine Basilica; Renaissance Revival; Romanesque Revival

Specifications
- Capacity: 500 people
- Length: 48 metres (157 ft)
- Width: 14.5 metres (48 ft)
- Height: 20 metres (66 ft)

The former Corpus Christi Chapel was built as a Basilica to model for seminarians the orders of Christian worship, and has 14 side altars in the cloister for rehearsal of sacraments. The architecture is a blend of the form of a Byzantine Basilica with a Renaissance ceiling and Romanesque Revival arches and exterior flying buttresses.

The chapel is 48 metres (157 ft) long, 14.5 metres (48 ft) wide, and 20 metres (66 ft) high. The chapel can seat up 500 people.

The main altar is surmounted by a cupola bearing the words in Latin, "Christus Altare Nostrum" (Christ Our Altar). The cross on the cupola is 2.8 by 1.6 metres (9 ft 2 in by 5 ft 3 in), and weighs 88 kilograms (194 lb). The cross was constructed by retired Senior Sargeant Norm Lieschke from Queensland maple that was donated by the Police Association.

Within the main chapel are stained glass windows, designed by Stephen Moor of Sydney, those on the left in red tones (for the Crucifixion) with medallions representing the Old Testament, those on the right in blue tones (for Mary) with medallions representing the New Testament.

To the right of the nave is the Chapel of Remembrance, with an eternal flame and memorial plaques for police officers who have died on duty. This chapel was dedicated during the Annual Church Service in 1988.

To the left is the chapel of St Michael, where the families of police can erect a plaque remembering a deceased police officer.

The chapel was rededicated as an interfaith chapel on 20 October 1974. The lectern is adorned with the Star of David.

The chapel is used for weddings, Baptisms, and funerals, for Victoria Police members only.

=== Gallery ===
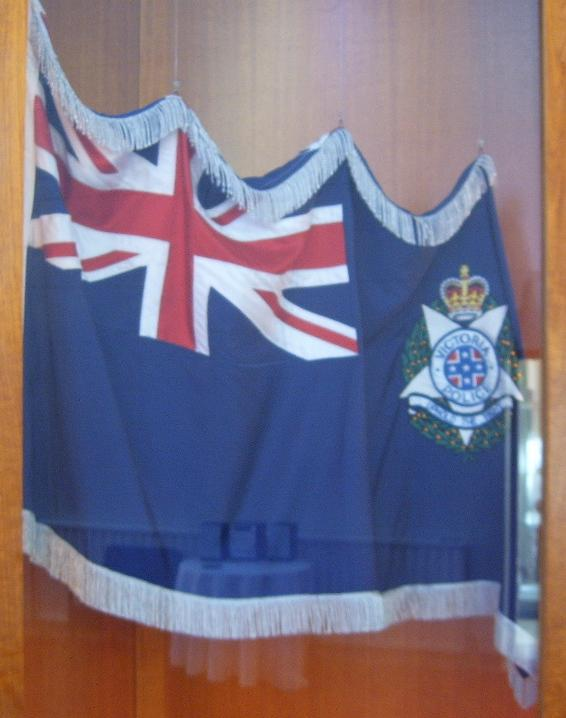
Ensign of the Victoria Police.

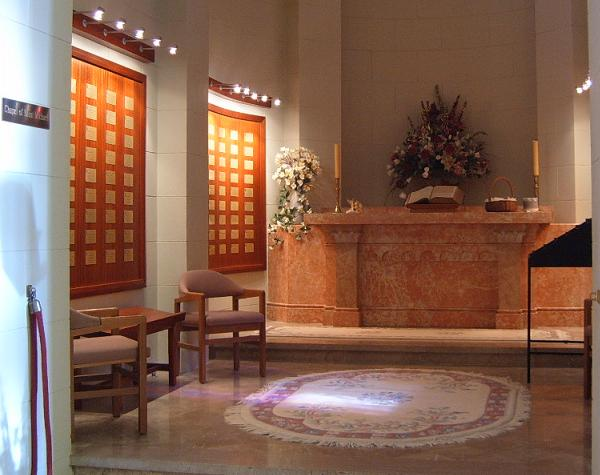
Chapel of St Michael, the patron saint of Police.

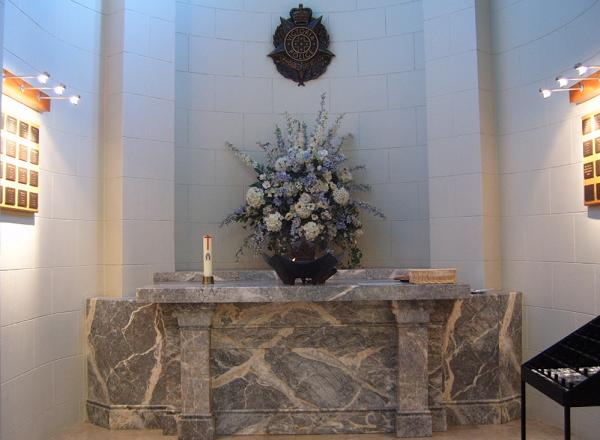
Chapel of Remembrance for Police who died on duty.

== Trivia ==
The academy is used by aircraft as an inbound reporting point when attempting to enter both the Moorabbin Airport Class D and Essendon Airport Class C control zones.
