= Lawrence Moran =

Australian Catholic bishop (1907–1970)

The Most Reverend Lawrence Moran
- Auxiliary Bishop of Archdiocese of Melbourne
- Archdiocese: Melbourne
- Installed: 3 December 1964
- Term ended: 15 March 1970
- Other post: Titular Bishop of Caesarea Philippi (1964–1970)

Orders
- Ordination: 26 July 1936 at St Patrick's Cathedral, Melbourne by Daniel Mannix
- Consecration: 3 December 1964 at Oval Maidan, Mumbai by Pope Paul VI

Personal details
- Born: Lawrence Patrick Moran; 28 July 1907 Oakleigh, Victoria, Australia
- Died: 15 March 1970 (aged 62) Melbourne, Victoria, Australia
- Denomination: Catholic Church
- Occupation: Catholic bishop
- Profession: Corpus Christi College, Melbourne

Lawrence Patrick Moran (28 July 1907 – 15 March 1970) was an Australian bishop of the Catholic Church. He served as Auxiliary Bishop of Melbourne for less than six years and died while in office.

== Early life ==
Moran was born in Oakleigh, Victoria to Patrick and Bridget Moran.

== Priesthood ==
Moran was ordained to the priesthood on 26 July 1936 at St Patrick's Cathedral, Melbourne by Archbishop Daniel Mannix.

In 1961, he was appointed vicar general of the Archdiocese of Melbourne, a position he would hold until his death.

== Episcopate ==
On 9 November 1964, Moran was appointed Auxiliary Bishop of Melbourne and Titular Bishop of Caesarea Philippi by Pope Paul VI. He was consecrated along with five other bishops on 3 December 1964 at Oval Maidan, Mumbai by Pope Paul VI. The ordination was part of the International Eucharistic Congress which was being held in India at the time.

== Death ==
Moran died on 15 March 1970 at the age of 62.

Catholic Church titles
Preceded by –	Auxiliary Bishop of Melbourne; 1964–1970	Succeeded by –
Preceded by Armando Lombardi	Titular Bishop of Caesarea Philippi; 1964–1970	Succeeded by Joseph Powathil
