= Cabarsussi =

Ancient municipality and bishopric in the Roman province of Byzacena

Cabarsussi was an ancient civitas (municipality) and bishopric in the Roman province of Byzacena (Roman North Africa), that is tentatively identifiable with ruins at Drâa-Bellouan in modern Tunisia. The current bishop is Terence Robert Curtin, auxiliary bishop of Melbourne.

Cabarsussi was the seat of an ancient diocese of which remains only the name as quasi-diocesan title, which may be granted to a pre-diocesan prelate, an auxiliary or coadjutor bishop etc.

== History ==
TO ELABORATE

The bishopric at Cabarsussi was established in 393 by a council of Donatist dissidents, who followed Maximian. The diocese was firmly Donatist in its churchmanship. Cabarsussi was the site of a Church Council in 393 called by a council of dissident Donatist bishops, held on 24 June 393 who excommunicated their primate Primianus, the Donatist Bishop of Carthage, in favor of Maximian. This council was hosted by Cabarsussi Bishop, Donato the first bishop of the newly created bishopric.

Another Donatist, Marciano, attended the Council of Carthage 411, as a strong hold of Donatism the town had no Catholic bishops at this time.

In the 6th century, Bishop Theodore, was mentioned by Victor of Tunnuna in his Chronicle of the history of the world; as a defender of the Three Chapters, Theodore was exiled to Constantinople, where he died the same day of the death of Justinian. Finally, the last known bishop of Cabarsussi is Mustolo, who took part in the anti-monothetalism Council of Carthage of 641.

Residential Suffragan Bishops

- Donatus (fl 393) (Donatist)
- Marcianus (fl 411) (Donatist)
- Theodorus (13 November 565)
- Mustolus (fl 641)

== Titular see ==
The diocese of Cabarsussi was nominally restored in 1933 as Latin Titular bishopric of Cabarsussi (Latin = Curiate Italian) / Cabarsussitan(us) (Latin adjective)

It has had the following incumbents, so far of the fitting Episcopal (lowest) rank :

- Gabriel Kihimbare (1964.09.29 – death? 1964.12.15) as Auxiliary bishop of Archdiocese of Gitega (1964.09.29 – 1964.12.15)
- Joseph Blomjous, White Fathers (M. Afr.) (1965.10.15 – resigned 1977.05.13) on emeritate, died 1992; previously Titular Bishop of Bubastis (1946.04.11 – 1950.06.27) as Apostolic Vicar of Musoma-Maswa (Tanzania) (1946.04.11 – 1950.06.24), Apostolic Vicar of Mwanza (Tanzania) (1950.06.25 – 1953.03.25), Apostolic Administrator of Apostolic Vicariate of Maswa (Tanzania) (1950.06.27 – 1953.03.25), Bishop of Mwanza (Tanzania) (1953.03.25 – retired 1965.10.15)
- Arnaldo Clemente Canale (1977.06.10 – death 1990.07.30) as Auxiliary Bishop of Archdiocese of Buenos Aires (Argentina) (1977.06.10 – 1990.07.30)
- Albert Malcolm Ranjith Patabendige Don (1991.06.17 – 1995.11.02) as Auxiliary Bishop of Archdiocese of Colombo (Sri Lanka) (1991.06.17 – 1995.11.02); later Bishop of Roman Catholic Diocese of Ratnapura (Sri Lanka) (1995.11.02 – 2001.10.01), Archbishop ad personam (2001.10.01 – 2004.04.29) as Adjunct Secretary of Congregation for the Evangelization of Peoples (2001.10.01 – 2005.12.10), Titular Archbishop of Umbriatico (2004.04.29 – 2009.06.16) as papal diplomat : Apostolic Nuncio (ambassador) to Indonesia (2004.04.29 – 2005.12.10), Apostolic Nuncio to Timor-Leste (2004.04.29 – 2005.12.10), Roman Curia official : Secretary of Congregation for Divine Worship and the Discipline of the Sacraments (2005.12.10 – 2009.06.16), Metropolitan Archbishop of above Colombo (Sri Lanka) (2009.06.16 – ...), President of Bishops’ Conference of Sri Lanka (2010.04 – ...), created Cardinal-Priest of S. Lorenzo in Lucina (2010.11.20 [2011.02.13] – ...)
- José María Pinheiro (1997.02.12 – 2005.03.09), first as Auxiliary Bishop of Diocese of Guajará-Mirim (Brazil) (1997.02.12 – 2003.08.06), then as Auxiliary Bishop of Archdiocese of São Paulo (Brazil) (2003.08.06 – 2005.03.09); later Bishop of Bragança Paulista (Brazil) (2005.03.09 – retired 2009.09.16)
- Joaquim Justino Carreira (2005.03.24 – 2011.11.23) as Auxiliary Bishop of Archdiocese of São Paulo (Brazil) (2005.03.24 – 2011.11.23); later Bishop of Guarulhos (Brazil) (2011.11.23 – death 2013.09.01)
- António Manuel Moiteiro Ramos (2012.06.08 – 2014.07.04) as Auxiliary Bishop of Archdiocese of Braga (Portugal) (2012.06.08 – 2014.07.04); later Bishop of Roman Catholic Diocese of Aveiro (Portugal) (2014.07.04 – ...)
- Terence Curtin (French) (2014.07.04 - ...) as Auxiliary Bishop of Archdiocese of Melbourne (Australia) (2014.11.07 – ...).

== See also ==
- List of Catholic dioceses in Tunisia

== Sources and external links ==
- GCatholic - (former and) titular see
- catholic-hierarchy.org
