= Rene Ramirez (bishop) =

Australian Catholic bishop (born 1969)

The Most Reverend Rene Ramirez RCJ
- Bishop of Sandhurst
- Church: Catholic
- Province: Melbourne
- Diocese: Sandhurst
- Appointed: 11 April 2026
- Installed: 30 July 2026
- Predecessor: Shane Mackinlay
- Previous post: Auxiliary Bishop of Melbourne & Titular Bishop of Mauriana (2025–2026)

Orders
- Ordination: 27 June 1998
- Consecration: 1 February 2025 by Peter Comensoli

Personal details
- Born: 29 March 1969 (age 57) Gapan, Philippines
- Denomination: Catholic
- Motto: Zelus et misericordia (Latin for 'Zeal and compassion')
- Styles
- Reference style: His Lordship; The Most Reverend
- Spoken style: My Lord
- Religious style: Bishop

Rene Ramirez (born 28 March 1969) is a Filipino bishop of the Catholic Church in Australia and a member of the Rogationists of the Heart of Jesus. In April 2026 he was appointed by Pope Leo XIV to be the ninth bishop of Sandhurst based in the regional city of Bendigo, Victoria. Since February 2025 he has been an auxiliary bishop of the Archdiocese of Melbourne.

== Early life ==
Ramirez was born in Gapan, Nueva Ecija, Philippines. He entered the Rogationists in 1985 at the age of 16. He professed solemn vows in 1995 and was ordained a priest on 27 June 1998.

== Priesthood ==
Following his ordination, Ramirez became the vocations director for his congregation in the Philippines. He then served as administrator, treasurer and vice-rector at Rogationist College in Cavite City. In 2003, he moved to Rome to complete licentiate studies in spirituality and earn a diploma in social communications from the Pontifical Gregorian University. He returned to the Philippines in 2006 and served in various roles within the Rogationists.

Ramirez moved to Australia in 2015 and served in the parishes of West Footscray, Maidstone and Braybrook within the Archdiocese of Melbourne. In 2023, he moved to the Diocese of Sandhurst to help his religious order establish a presence there.

== Episcopal ministry ==
On 8 November 2024, Pope Francis announced his appointment of Ramirez and Thinh Xuan Nguyen as auxiliary bishops of the Archdiocese of Melbourne. They were consecrated bishops on 1 February 2025 at St Patrick's Cathedral in Melbourne. The principal consecrator was Archbishop Peter Comensoli with Bishop Gregory Bennet of Sale and Bishop Shane Mackinlay of Sandhurst as co-consecrators. On 11 April 2026 it was announced that Ramirez had been appointed by Pope Leo XIV to be the ninth bishop of Sandhurst. His installation occurred on 30 July 2026 at Sacred Heart Cathedral, Bendigo.
