= Diocese of Melbourne =

Diocese of Melbourne or Archdiocese of Melbourne could refer to:

- Anglican Diocese of Melbourne
- Roman Catholic Archdiocese of Melbourne
