= Rene Ramirez (disambiguation) =

Rene Ramirez may refer to:

- Rene Ramirez, a character in the TV series Arrow
- Rene Ramirez (bishop), a Roman Catholic bishop in Australia
