= Catholic Theological College =

Theological college in Australia

Coordinates: 37.809110°S 144.980550°E

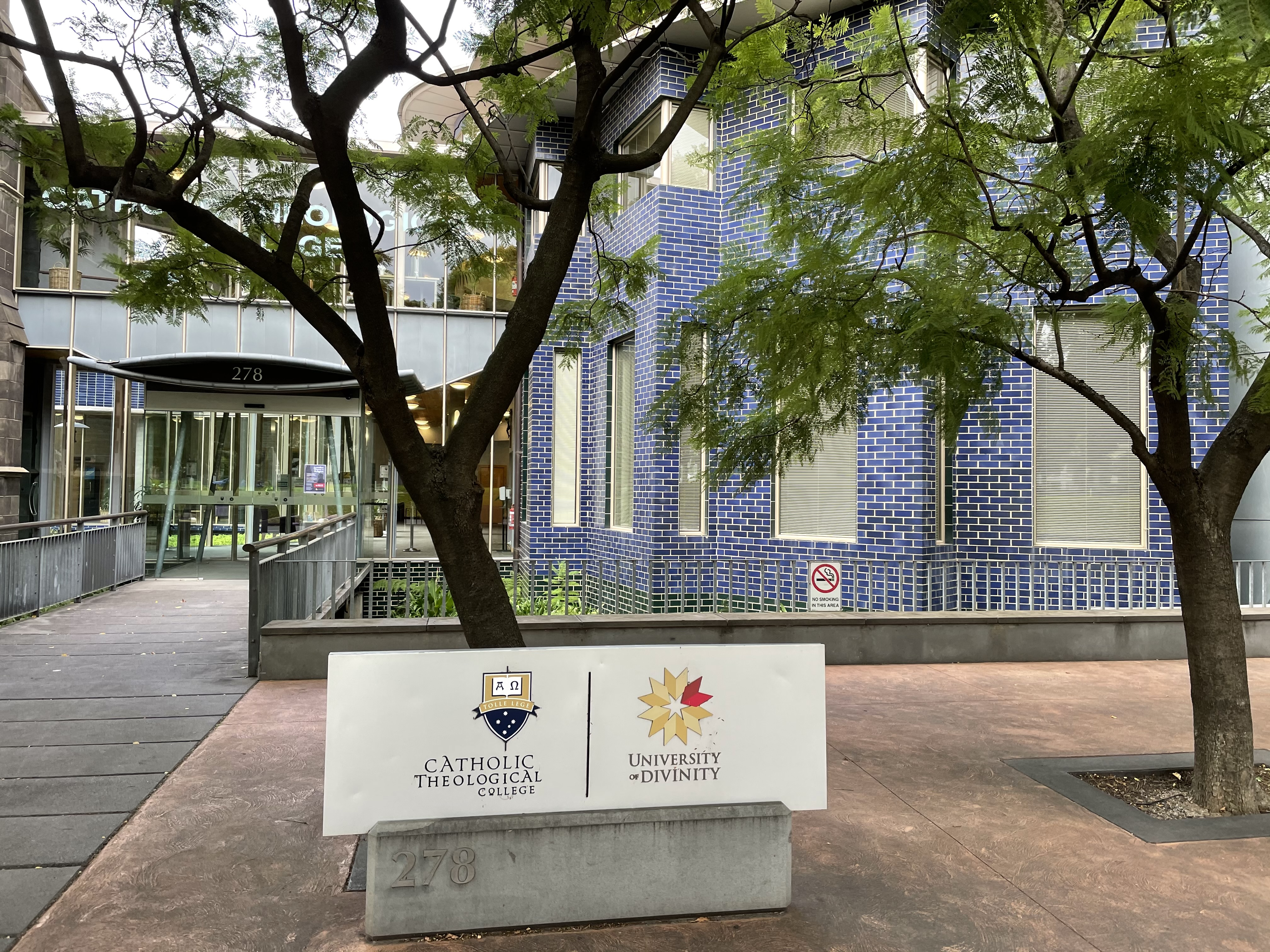
- Motto: Tolle lege ("Take up and read")
- Established: 1972
- Religious affiliation: Roman Catholic
- Academic affiliations: University of Divinity
- Master: Kevin Lenehan
- Location: East Melbourne, Victoria, Australia
- Website: ctc.edu.au

Catholic Theological College (CTC) is one of the constituent theological colleges of the University of Divinity, an Australian collegiate university of specialisation in divinity. The college is located in East Melbourne, Victoria.

== History ==
Catholic Theological College was established in 1972 when a group of dioceses and religious institutes agreed to act together as a confederated body in academic matters. In 1973 the college became a Recognised Teaching Institution of the Melbourne College of Divinity (now the University of Divinity) and thereby authorised to teach the Bachelor of Theology.

Cardinal James Knox (1914-1983) was the driving force behind the establishment of a central Catholic college in Melbourne, rather than maintaining separate seminaries for diocesan priests and religious institutes. The successful outcome provided enhanced theological education for seminarians and lay students, with degrees awarded through the Melbourne College of Divinity. Knox's initiatives required major building works, with existing seminaries eventually replaced with a new complex in Clayton. This site was selected for its close proximity to Monash University, and provided diocesan students with the opportunity to gain a university degree in the course of their studies.

The new site opened in 1973 with Catholic Theological College co-located with the new Corpus Christi College seminary. CTC had its own head of college, known as the master, and was attended by students from Corpus Christi College and other seminaries, religious sisters and brothers, as well as lay people. In CTC's first year, invitations were sent out to the superiors of religious institutes, inviting them to send students to study theology. The religious sisters in particular readily accepted this invitation and over the years have been among the college's major supporters.

Although Knox's vision for a single Catholic college in which all seminaries were involved was only partially fulfilled, his innovations were a great improvement on previous fragmentation. Since 1978, the college has held an annual Knox Public Lecture, acknowledging Cardinal Knox's original vision for its foundation. Notable presenters of the Knox Public Lecture include: Archbishop Stylianos of Australia in 1989, Alan Jones in 1992, Davis McCaughey in 1993, Keith Rayner in 1995, Michael Tate in 1997 and Margaret Manion in 2001. The main classroom at CTC is also named in Knox's honour.

In 2000, Catholic Theological College's new building in East Melbourne was officially opened. The new Thomas Carr Centre, which incorporated administration, faculty offices and the Mannix Library, adjoined a 1870s neo-Gothic building that was formerly the Christian Brothers' Cathedral College. Melbourne-based architect Gregory Burgess created the design that brought the two buildings together. Gregory Burgess Architects received several awards for the construction of the Catholic Theological College building. These included the Royal Australian Institute of Architects (VIC) Commendation: The Melbourne Prize in 2000 and the Australian Property Institute, Heritage Property Award in 2001.

== Masters of the college ==
- Austin Cooper OMI AM - 1972–1976, 1992–1994, 1998-2002 Cooper was made a Member of the Order of Australia on 26 January 2004 for service to education and scholarship, particularly through the Melbourne College of Divinity, and to the community through the Oblates of Mary Immaculate Congregation.
- Gerard Diamond - 1977-1983
- John Begley SJ - 1983-1985
- Norman Ford SDB - 1986-1991
- Mark Coleridge - 1995-1997
- Terence Curtin - 2003-2010
- Shane Mackinlay - 2011-2019
- Kevin Lenehan - 2019-current

The following Masters of CTC also served as presidents of the Melbourne College of Divinity.

- Austin Cooper OMI AM - 1976-1977
- Norman Ford SDB - 1991-1992
- Terence Curtin - 2010-2011

Austin Cooper OMI AM and Norman Ford SDB were also elected as fellows of the Melbourne College of Divinity in 1990 and 2001 respectively.

== Affiliated seminaries ==
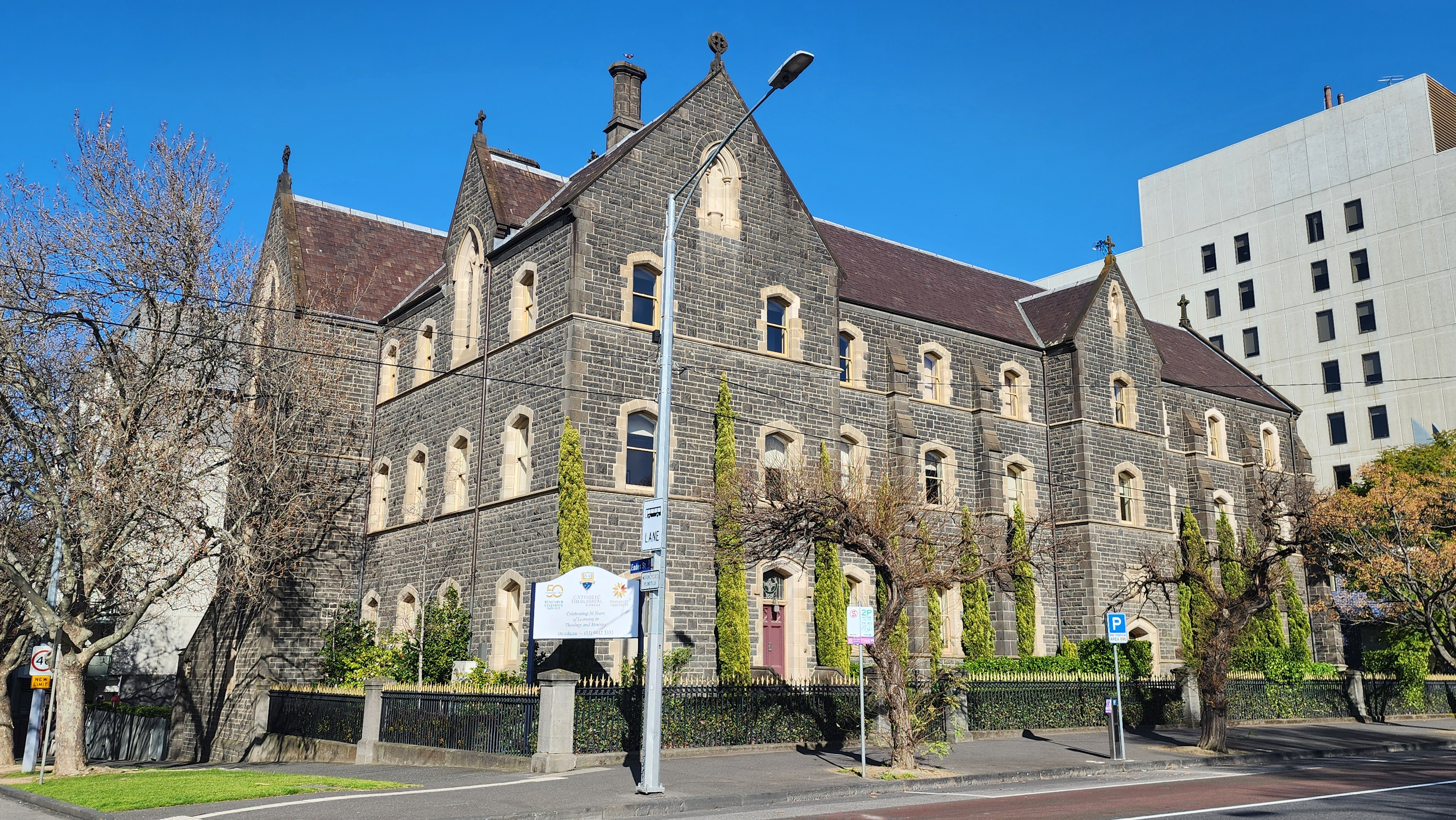
Intersection of Eades Street and Victoria Parade

Catholic Theological College is a federation of the following autonomous seminaries based in Melbourne:

- Corpus Christi College (diocesan seminary for Victoria and Tasmania), Carlton
- St Joseph of Cupertino Friary (Order of Friars Minor Conventual), Dingley
- St Dominic's Priory (Order of Preachers), Camberwell
- John Paul II House of Formation (Missionaries of God's Love), Burwood
- St Mary's Seminary (Missionary Oblates of Mary Immaculate), Camberwell
- Don Bosco House (Salesians of Don Bosco), Clifton Hill
- Salvatorian Formation House (Society of the Divine Saviour), Alphington
- Faber House Community (Society of Jesus), Parkville

== Notable alumni and faculty ==
- Bernadette Keating PVBM
- Bill Daniel SJ, 1930–1994
- Christopher Prowse
- Clare Johnson, alumni and now director of the ACU Centre for Liturgy
- Frances Baker RSM, alumni and former deputy master
- Francis Moloney
- John Scullion SJ, 1925–1990
- Mark Coleridge
- Mark Edwards OMI
- Race Mathews
- Richard Divall, 1945-2017
- Robyn Horner
- Shane Mackinlay
- Timothy Costelloe SDB
- Tony Ireland
