= Drâa-Bellouan =

Settlement in Tunisia

Drâa-Bellouan is a town in modern Tunisia.

Drâa-Bellouan was known during the Roman Empire as Cabarsussi a civitas of the Roman province of Byzacena.
