= Ireland Will Be Free =

1920 film

- Directed by: Bert Cross
- Starring: Daniel Mannix
- Release date: 10 May 1920
- Running time: 45 mins
- Country: Australia
- Language: Silent

Ireland Will be Free is a 1920 Australian documentary film. It was about the 1920 St Patrick's Day Parade in Melbourne.

== Production ==
Daniel Mannix was behind the making of the film to show his support for an Irish Free State. John Wren was also involved.

A restored and remastered version was exhibited by the State Library of Victoria in 2016.
