= Cathedral College, East Melbourne =

Catholic school and monastery in East Melbourne, Australia

Coordinates: 37.809°S 144.981°E

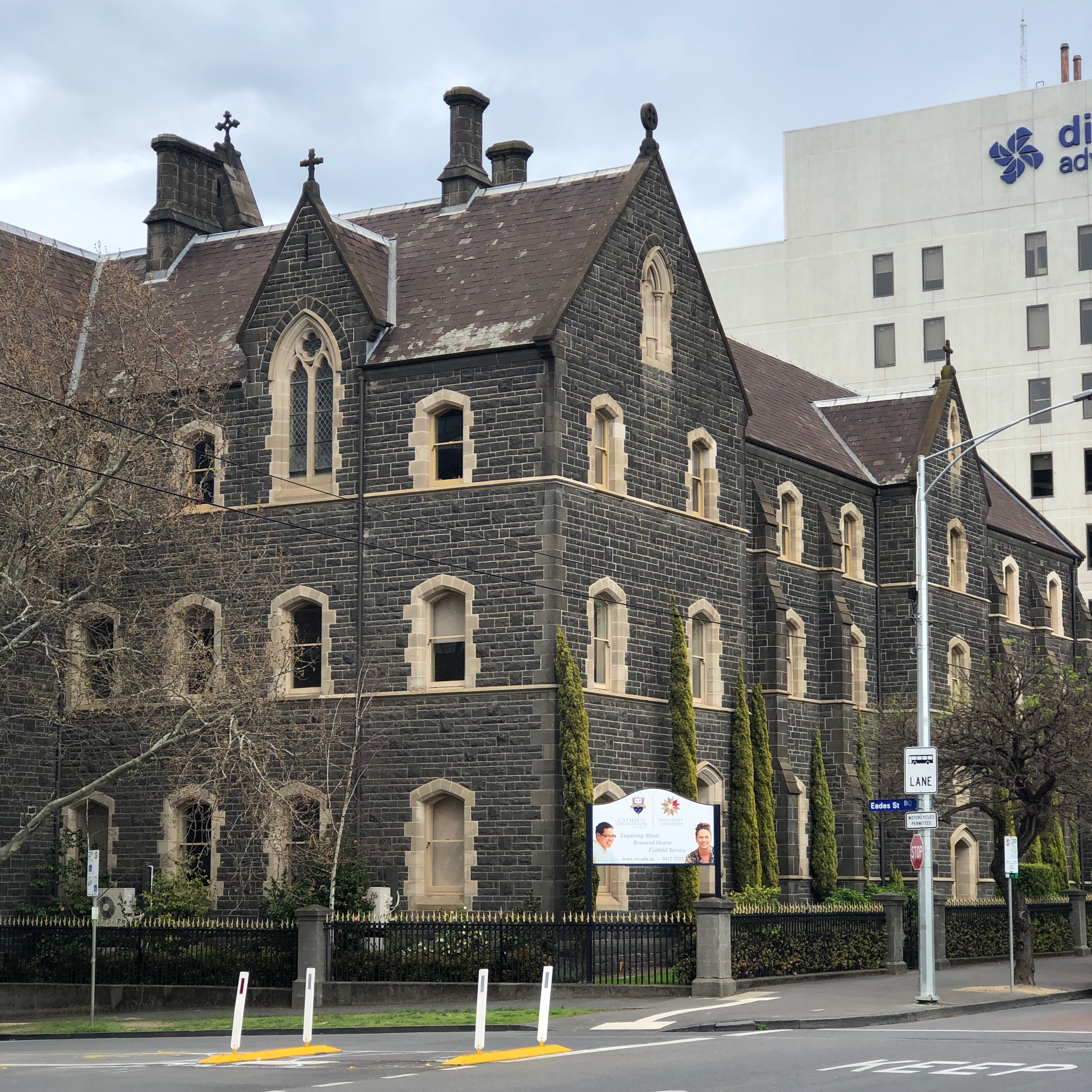
The Cathedral College building in East Melbourne

Cathedral College, East Melbourne, was an all-boys, Catholic high school run by the Congregation of Christian Brothers on Victoria Parade, in East Melbourne, Victoria, Australia.

It was on the former site of the Christian Brothers' school, Parade College, which had been relocated to Bundoora in 1968 and St Kevin's College, which moved to Toorak in 1932.

Cathedral College operated at the Victoria Parade location from 1968 and 1995, teaching classes from year 5 to year 10 and accommodated approximately 300 boys.

It was home to the renowned St Patrick's Cathedral Choir from 1968 until the school's closure, when the choristers moved to St Kevin's College.

The Catholic Theological College currently operates on a part of the former college site, with the remainder, the original St Kevin's College building on Albert Street, having been converted into apartments.

== Heritage-listed building ==
The school building, designed by prominent 19th century architect, William Wardell, is considered to be of architectural significance within the state of Victoria, and is heritage-listed.
