= Shane Mackinlay =

Australian Roman Catholic priest (born 1965)

The Most Reverend Shane Mackinlay
- Metropolitan Archbishop of Brisbane
- Church: Roman Catholic Church
- Archdiocese: Brisbane
- Province: Brisbane
- Appointed: 18 June 2025
- Installed: 11 September 2025
- Predecessor: Mark Coleridge

Orders
- Ordination: 6 September 1991
- Consecration: 16 October 2019 by Peter Comensoli

Personal details
- Born: 5 June 1965 (age 61) Brunswick, Melbourne, Australia
- Education: Corpus Christi College; Melbourne College of Divinity; Monash University; Catholic University of Leuven
- Motto: That they may have life
- Coat of arms

Shane Anthony Mackinlay (born 5 June 1965) is an Australian Catholic prelate who has served as Archbishop of Brisbane since 2025. He was previously Bishop of Sandhurst from 2019 to 2025. He was the master of Catholic Theological College in Melbourne from 2010 to 2019.

== Life and career ==
Shane Mackinlay was born in Brunswick, Melbourne, on 5 June 1965. He studied at Corpus Christi College and obtained a bachelor's degree in theology from the Melbourne College of Divinity and a degree in physics from Monash University. He earned a doctorate in philosophy from the Catholic University of Leuven in 2005.

Mackinlay was ordained a priest for the Diocese of Ballarat on 6 September 1991. He was parish priest in Colac from 1992 to 1997 and then at the cathedral in Ballarat. In 1998 he became parish priest of Sebastopol, secretary to Bishop Peter Connors and a lecturer at the Australian Catholic University. He served as a member of the diocese's college of consultors from 1999 to 2013. Until he was named a bishop in 2019, he served a parish in Bungaree from 2005 and another in Gordon from 2009 and headed the Advisory Council of Ballarat from 2010. He was master of Catholic Theological College in Melbourne from 2010 until his episcopal appointment.

From 2012 to 2014, during the inquiry conducted by the Parliament of Victoria into how the Catholic Church and other institutions had handled child abuse, Mackinlay served as spokesperson for the church. In September 2012, when the church submitted its report to the inquiry, Mackinlay said it had been difficult for the church to recognise the reality and extent of child abuse because "We had a very strong clerical culture which made it very difficult both for laypeople, for the families of these victims, for people in our schools, for people in our parishes and certainly for people in leadership and authority to accept that priests and religious [that is, members of religious orders] could do these evil things." The next year he was criticised by inquiry officials after he traced the origins of the abuse crisis to the social mores of the 1960s and 1970s and attempts to lower the age of consent. One official called his remarks disingenuous.

On 23 July 2019, Pope Francis appointed Mackinlay as Bishop of Sandhurst. On 16 October 2019, he was consecrated a bishop by Peter Comensoli, Archbishop of Melbourne, at Sacred Heart Cathedral, Bendigo, and installed as Bishop of Sandhurst.

On 18 June 2025, Pope Leo XIV appointed him Archbishop of Brisbane. His installation was held at the Cathedral of St Stephen on 11 September 2025.
