= Denis Hart =

Catholic archbishop of Melbourne, Victoria, Australia

The Most Reverend Denis Hart
- Archbishop Emeritus of Melbourne
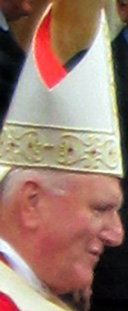
- Church: Roman Catholic Church
- Archdiocese: Melbourne
- See: Melbourne
- Appointed: 22 June 2001
- Installed: 1 August 2001
- Term ended: 29 June 2018
- Predecessor: George Pell
- Successor: Peter Comensoli
- Previous posts: Auxiliary Bishop of Melbourne (1997–2001); Titular Bishop of Vagada (1997–2001); President of the Australian Episcopal Conference (2012–18)

Orders
- Ordination: 22 July 1967 by Arthur Francis Fox
- Consecration: 9 December 1997 by George Pell

Personal details
- Born: Denis James Hart; 16 May 1941 (age 85) East Melbourne, Victoria, Australia]
- Residence: Saint Patrick's Cathedral
- Education: Xavier College; Corpus Christi College
- Motto: Constant in Faith

Ordination history of Denis Hart
History
Priestly ordination
- Ordained by: Arthur Francis Fox (Sale)
- Date: 22 July 1967
- Place: St Patrick's Cathedral, Melbourne
Episcopal consecration
- Principal consecrator: George Pell
- Co-consecrators: Frank Little; Hilton Deakin
- Date: 9 December 1997
- Place: St Patrick's Cathedral, Melbourne
Episcopal succession
Bishops consecrated by Denis Hart as principal consecrator
- Mark Coleridge: 19 June 2002
- Christopher Prowse: 19 May 2003
- Peter Elliott: 30 April 2007
- Timothy Costelloe: 15 June 2007
- Les Tomlinson: 17 June 2009
- Vincent Long Van Nguyen: 23 June 2011
- Paul Bird: 16 October 2012
- Terence Curtin: 17 December 2014
- Mark Stuart Edwards: 17 December 2014
- Patrick O'Regan: 26 February 2015

Styles of Denis James Hart
- Reference style: The Most Reverend
- Spoken style: Your Grace or My Lord Archbishop
- Religious style: Archbishop

Denis James Hart (born 16 May 1941) is a retired Australian prelate of the Catholic Church. He was Archbishop of Melbourne from 2001 to 2018.

== Early years and background ==
Hart was born in East Melbourne, Victoria, the eldest of the three children of Kevin and Annie Hart. He was educated at St John's Marist Brothers in Hawthorn and Xavier College in Kew. He studied for the priesthood at Corpus Christi College from 1960 to 1967.

Ordained at St Patrick's Cathedral, Melbourne, in 1967, Hart served as a hospital chaplain, an assistant parish priest and then master of ceremonies at St Patrick's Cathedral. He supervised the preparation of the books used in worship, including the lectionary for Mass. He was liturgy director and assistant master of ceremonies for the 1986 papal visit to Australia. In 1987 Hart became a parish priest and in 1996 he became vicar general and moderator of the archdiocese's curia. He has served in the parishes of North Balwyn, North Richmond and West Brunswick. In 1997, he was consecrated a bishop and made an auxiliary bishop in the Archdiocese of Melbourne.

== Archbishop ==
In 2001, Hart was appointed Archbishop of Melbourne, replacing George Pell who became the Archbishop of Sydney. On 29 June 2001, he received the pallium from Pope John Paul II in St Peter's Square.

Within the Australian Catholic Bishops Conference, he was a member of the permanent committee from 2002, chairman of the Bishops' Commission for Administration and Information (2002–2012), member of the Bishops' Commission for Liturgy (1998–2012) and vice president of the conference (2010–2012). He has been chair of the ad hoc committee for the Personal Ordinariate of Our Lady of the Southern Cross since 2010. In May 2012, he was elected president of the Australian Catholic Bishops Conference for two years. He has been a member of the International Commission on English in the Liturgy since 2003 and its vice president (2010–2014). He took part in the Oceania Synod and ad limina visits in 1998, 2004 and 2011. In 2007, Hart expressed that he was troubled by the remarks of St Patrick's Cathedral priest Geoff Baron.

During 2016, Hart urged schools to be sensitive and respectful to students who want to invite a same-sex date to school dance nights. "These are quite often emotional situations and it's very important that we always have respect for the dignity of the human being involved", he said when Fairfax asked for his response to a previously unreported case at the Academy of Mary Immaculate in Fitzroy.

He was appointed a member of the Congregation for Divine Worship and the Discipline of the Sacraments.

Pope Francis accepted his resignation on 29 June 2018.

Hart requested a Melbourne parish priest stand down while the priest was investigated by civil authorities for allegedly violating child safety laws.

== Controversies ==
In 2009 during a court case, Hart was accused of having told a woman to "Go to hell, bitch" when she had knocked on his door in the middle of the night in 2004. On the ABC on 14 November 2013, Hart acknowledged making the comment, then immediately asserting that he always followed the teachings of the Roman Catholic Church. He apologised for it and described it as unfortunate.

In May 2013, Hart appeared at a Victorian parliamentary inquiry into child sex abuse. He commented, in regard to why it took 18 years to have a priest laicised for sexually abusing children, "Better late than never."

On 15 August 2017, Hart stated that if the law was changed to require clergy to report child sexual abuse learned of during confessionals, he would break the law and not report such abuse.

Catholic Church titles
Preceded by George Pell	Archbishop of Melbourne; 2001–2018	Succeeded by Peter Comensoli
