= Peter Comensoli =

Catholic archbishop of Melbourne

The Most Reverend Peter Comensoli
- Metropolitan Archbishop of Melbourne
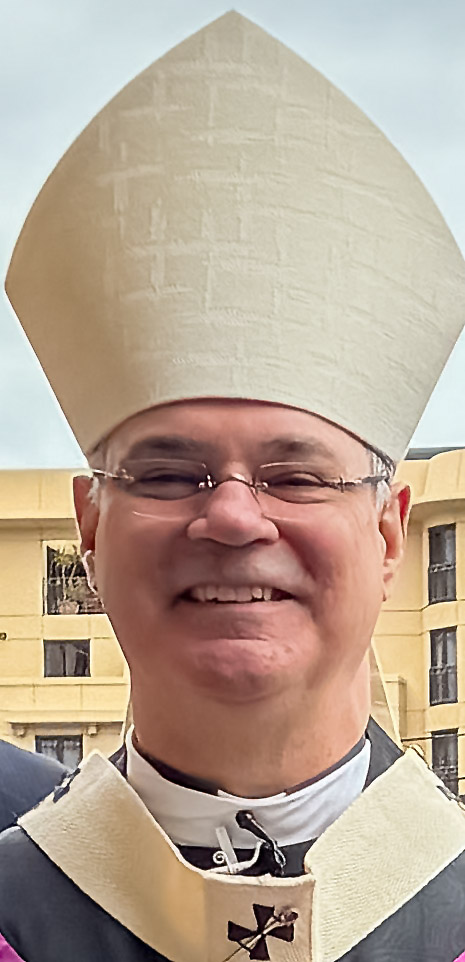
- Comensoli in 2025
- Church: Catholic Church
- Archdiocese: Melbourne
- See: Melbourne
- Appointed: 29 June 2018
- Installed: 1 August 2018
- Predecessor: Denis Hart
- Previous posts: Auxiliary Bishop of Sydney (2011–2014); Titular Bishop of Tigisis in Numidia (2011–2014); Apostolic Administrator of Sydney (2014); Bishop of Broken Bay (2014–2018)

Orders
- Ordination: 22 May 1992 by William Edward Murray
- Consecration: 8 June 2011 by George Pell

Personal details
- Born: Peter Andrew Comensoli; 25 March 1964 (age 62) Illawarra, Australia
- Denomination: Roman Catholic
- Education: University of Wollongong; Alphonsian Academy; University of St Andrews; University of Edinburgh
- Motto: Praedicamus Christum crucifixum ("We proclaim a crucified Christ")
- Coat of arms: Peter Comensoli's coat of arms

Styles of Peter Comensoli
- Reference style: The Most Reverend
- Spoken style: Your Grace
- Religious style: Bishop

Ordination history of Peter Comensoli
History
Priestly ordination
- Ordained by: William Edward Murray
Episcopal consecration
- Principal consecrator: George Pell (Sydney)
- Co-consecrators: Philip Wilson (Adelaide); Peter Ingham (Wollongong)
Episcopal succession
Bishops consecrated by Peter Comensoli as principal consecrator
- Shane Mackinlay: 16 October 2019

Peter Andrew Comensoli (born 25 March 1964) is an Australian Catholic prelate who was named the ninth Archbishop of Melbourne on 29 June 2018.

He had been serving as the third Bishop of Broken Bay in New South Wales since December 2014. From 2011 to 2014 he was an auxiliary bishop of the Archdiocese of Sydney.

== Early life ==
Comensoli studied at St Paul's (now Holy Spirit) College, Bellambi, New South Wales, and studied commerce at the University of Wollongong while working for four years in the banking sector before switching to theology.

== Priesthood ==
Comensoli entered St Patrick's Seminary in 1986 and obtained a Bachelor of Theology (BTh) degree in 1989 and a Bachelor of Sacred Theology (STB) degree in 1991 from the Catholic Institute of Sydney. He was ordained a priest of the Diocese of Wollongong in 1992 by William Edward Murray. Comensoli obtained a Licentiate of Sacred Theology (STL) from the Alphonsian Academy in Rome in 2000, a Master of Letters (MLitt) degree in moral philosophy from the University of St Andrews in 2007 and a Doctor of Philosophy (PhD) degree in theological ethics from the University of Edinburgh. His doctoral thesis was titled "Recognising persons: the profoundly impaired and Christian anthropology" and was submitted in 2012.

== Episcopacy ==
Comensoli was appointed an auxiliary bishop of the Archdiocese of Sydney and titular bishop of Tigisis in Numidia by Pope Benedict XVI on 20 April 2011. He was consecrated as a bishop by Cardinal George Pell at St Mary's Cathedral in Sydney on 8 June 2011, becoming Australia's youngest Catholic bishop.

On 27 February 2014, Comensoli was appointed by Pope Francis as apostolic administrator of the Archdiocese of Sydney following Cardinal Pell's appointment as prefect of the newly formed Secretariat for the Economy. On 18 September 2014, Pope Francis appointed Anthony Fisher the new Archbishop of Sydney, and Comensoli remained the apostolic administrator until Fisher's installation on 12 November.

On 20 November 2014, Pope Francis appointed Comensoli as the Bishop of Broken Bay. His installation took place on 12 December.

On 29 June 2018, Comensoli was appointed Archbishop of Melbourne. He was installed on 1 August.

Comensoli is the Grand Prior of the Victoria Australia Lieutenancy of the Equestrian Order of the Holy Sepulchre of Jerusalem.

Comensoli personally vouched for Cardinal Pell by signing a letter of support in 2015 ahead of the Royal Commission into Institutional Child Sexual Abuse, describing him as a "man of integrity", and considered him a personal friend.

Comensoli has stated that he would not break the seal of confession for confessions which include admissions of sexual abuse.

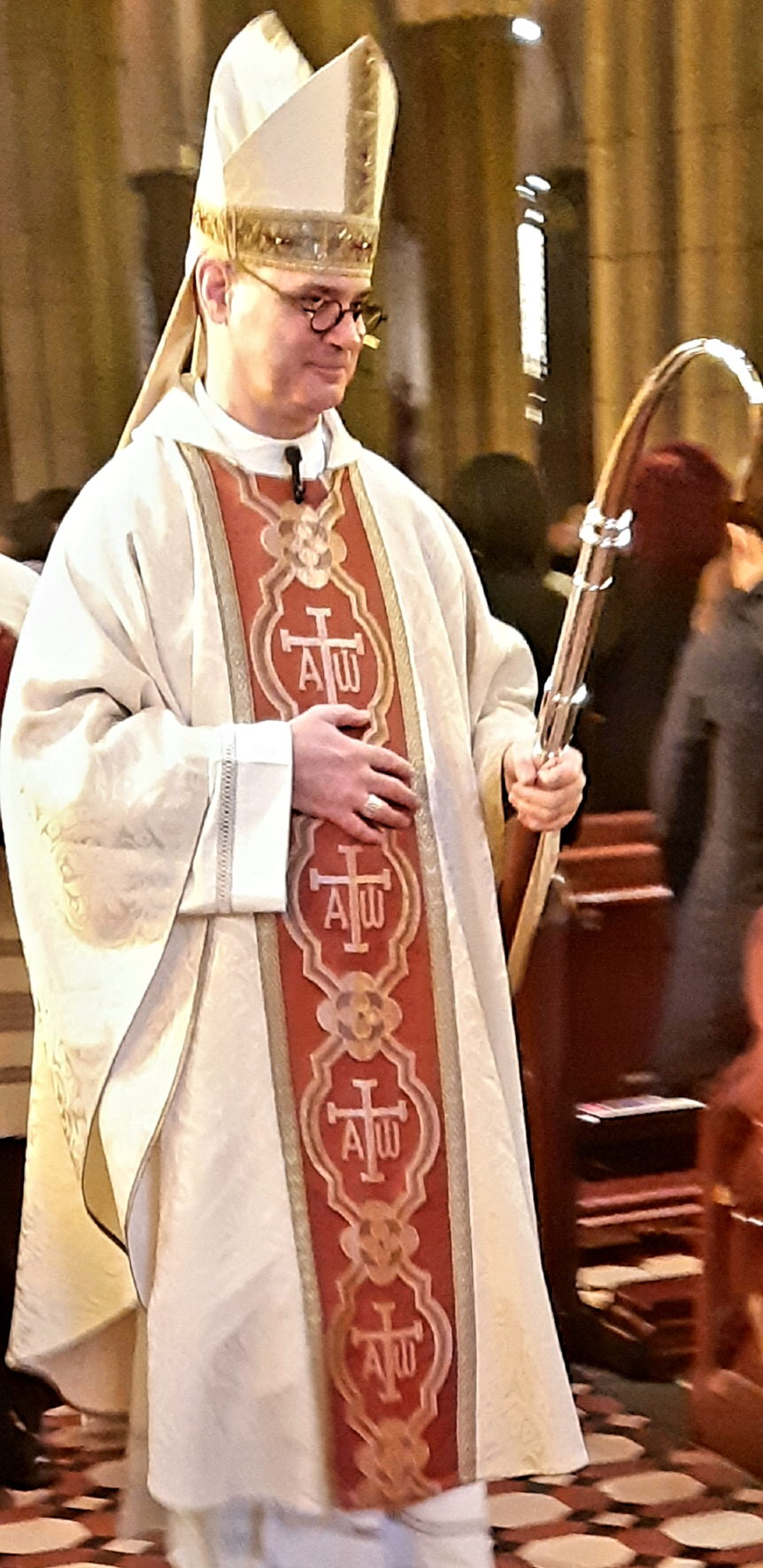

Catholic Church titles
Preceded by Aldo Maria Lazzarín Stella	— TITULAR — Titular Bishop of Tigisis in Numidia; 2011–2014	Succeeded by Denis Jachiet
Preceded by David Walker	Bishop of Broken Bay; 2014–2018	Succeeded by Anthony Randazzo
Preceded by Denis James Hart	Roman Catholic Archbishop of Melbourne; 2018–present	Incumbent
