= Justin Simonds =

Catholic archbishop of Melbourne in Australia

The Most Reverend Justin Simonds
- 4th Archbishop of Melbourne
- Diocese: Melbourne
- Installed: 6 November 1963
- Term ended: 13 May 1967
- Predecessor: Daniel Mannix
- Successor: James Knox
- Other posts: 5th Archbishop of Hobart (1937–1942); Coadjutor Archbishop of Melbourne (1942–1963)

Orders
- Ordination: 30 November 1912 in St Mary's Cathedral, Sydney
- Consecration: 6 May 1937

Personal details
- Born: 22 May 1890 Glen Innes, New South Wales, Australia
- Died: 3 November 1967 (aged 77) Melbourne, Victoria, Australia
- Buried: St Patrick's Cathedral, Melbourne
- Denomination: Roman Catholic
- Occupation: Cleric
- Education: Sydney Boys' High School; St Patrick's College, Manly; Catholic University of Louvain

Styles of Justin Simonds
- Reference style: The Most Reverend
- Spoken style: Your Grace
- Religious style: Archbishop

Justin Daniel Simonds (22 May 1890 – 3 November 1967) was an Australian prelate of the Roman Catholic Church, serving as the 5th Archbishop of Hobart from 1937 to 1942 and as the 4th Archbishop of Melbourne from 1963 to 1967.

== Early years ==
Born in Glen Innes, New South Wales, Simonds was educated in Deepwater, Blacktown and then Sydney Boys' High School before studying for the priesthood at St Patrick's College, Manly. He was ordained a priest by Archbishop Michael Kelly on 30 November 1912 at St Mary's Cathedral, Sydney.

Posted to Bega, Simonds served as a curate before he returned to St Patrick's Seminary as a professor of sacred scripture and Greek. In 1916 he was appointed to St Columba's College, Springwood, as professor of hermeneutics. In 1921 he returned to St Patrick's Seminary as professor of sacred scripture and dean. Between 1928 and 1930, Simonds studied at the Catholic University of Louvain, Belgium, graduating in 1930 with a PhD (first class honours). Returning to Springwood, Simonds served as vice rector and then rector of St Columba's College from 1931 to 1937.

== Episcopacy ==
On 18 February 1937, Pius XI appointed Simonds as Archbishop of Hobart. Simonds received his episcopal consecration on 6 May from Archbishop Giovanni Panico, with bishops Norman Gilroy and Patrick Joseph Farrelly serving as co-consecrators. Simonds was the first native-born Australian archbishop. During his term in Hobart, Simonds fostered the observance of Social Justice Sunday and wrote the first of the bishops' annual statements on social justice in 1940.

In 1942, Simonds was named Coadjutor Archbishop of Melbourne and Titular Archbishop of Antinoë. Archbishop Mannix appointed him as the parish priest of St Mary Star of the Sea, West Melbourne. He was to remain Coadjutor Archbishop of Melbourne for the next 22 years. During this period, Simonds played an active role in post World War II healing, including Catholic migration and the sending of orphaned children to Australia. In 1949, he was a special adviser and attended part of the United Nations General Assembly, held at Lake Success, New York.

Attending the Second Vatican Council from 1962 to 1965, he succeeded Daniel Mannix as Archbishop of Melbourne on 6 November 1963, becoming the first native Australian to hold that office. He returned to Melbourne where he celebrated Mannix's Funeral Mass and preached the panegyric: "We are mourning one of the world's leaders of our time. A cedar of Lebanon has fallen", said Simonds.

Unlike Mannix, Simonds abhorred the involvement of the church in party politics and vigorously opposed any attempt for the church to be involved in politics and industrial relations. Simonds was critical of B. A. Santamaria and the associated Catholic Social Studies Movement, terminating Santamaria's weekly contribution to a Catholic television program, Sunday Magazine, within days of taking office.

On 19 July 1964, he dedicated the new pipe organ in St Patrick's Cathedral to the memory of his predecessor. This instrument, one of the largest in Australia, has 4,762 pipes and a set of Spanish trumpets. It remains in use today.

Ill-health and age reduced Simonds' own period as Melbourne's archbishop, suffering several strokes while in office and his vision greatly deteriorated. He eventually resigned on 13 May 1967, after only three years of service. Upon his retirement, he was made titular Archbishop of Libertina. On 3 November 1967, Simonds died from a stroke at the Mercy Hospital in Melbourne, aged 77. He was buried in the crypt of St Patrick's Cathedral in Melbourne alongside his predecessor.

== Legacy ==
Named in his honour are Justin Villa, the home in Melbourne for retired priests, and Simonds Catholic College in West Melbourne and Fitzroy North.

Catholic Church titles
Preceded by William Hayden	5th Catholic Archbishop of Hobart; 1937–1942	Succeeded by Ernest Victor Tweedy
Preceded by Daniel Mannix	4th Catholic Archbishop of Melbourne; 1963–1967	Succeeded by James Knox
