= Archdiocese of Melbourne =

Catholic ecclesiastical territory

Archdiocese of Melbourne Archidioecesis Melburnensis
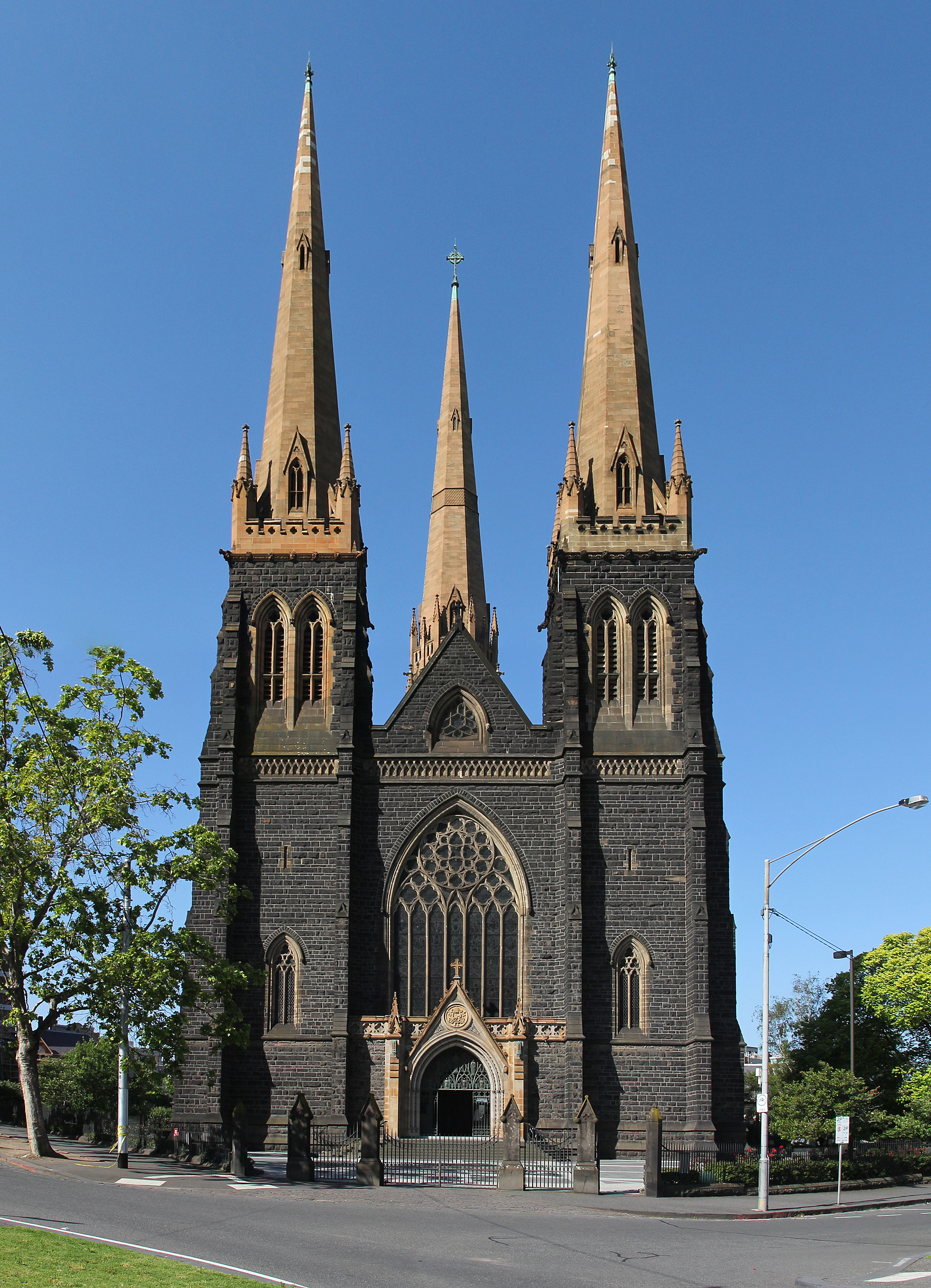
- St Patrick's Cathedral, Melbourne

Location
- Country: Australia
- Territory: Melbourne
- Ecclesiastical province: Melbourne
- Coordinates: 37°48′32″S 144°58′46″E

Statistics
- Area: 27,194 km^{2} (10,500 sq mi)
- Population: Total; Catholics: (as of 2020); ▲4,810,000; ▲1,264,150 ( 26.3%)
- Parishes: 216

Information
- Denomination: Catholic
- Sui iuris church: Latin Church
- Rite: Roman Rite
- Established: 31 March 1874
- Cathedral: St Patrick's Cathedral, Melbourne
- Patron saint: Saint Patrick

Current leadership
- Pope: Leo XIV
- Archbishop: Peter Comensoli
- Auxiliary Bishops: Martin Ashe; Thinh Xuan Nguyen
- Bishops emeritus: Denis Hart; Terence Curtin

Map

Website
- www.melbournecatholic.org

The Archdiocese of Melbourne is a Latin Rite metropolitan archdiocese in Melbourne, Victoria, Australia. Erected initially in 1847 as the Diocese of Melbourne, a suffragan diocese of the Archdiocese of Sydney, the diocese was elevated in 1874 as an archdiocese of the Ecclesiastical Province of Melbourne and is the metropolitan see for the suffragan dioceses of Sale, Sandhurst and Ballarat and also the Ukrainian Catholic Eparchy of Ss Peter and Paul. The Archdiocese of Hobart is attached to the archdiocese for administrative purposes. St Patrick's Cathedral is the seat of the Archbishop of Melbourne, currently Peter Comensoli, who succeeded Denis Hart on 1 August 2018.

According to the 2006 Commonwealth Census figures, there were 4,932,423 people within the province. Of these, 1,349,828 were Catholic, about 28% of the population.

== History ==
When Melbourne, then called the Port Philip Settlement, and the surrounding area was being settled by European settlers in the 1830s, the area was a part of the Roman Catholic Ecclesiastical Province of Sydney in the Archdiocese of Sydney. In 1839, John Polding, the Archbishop of Sydney, placed Patrick Bonaventure Geoghegan in charge of the Port Philip Settlement and the first Mass was celebrated in Melbourne on Pentecost Sunday, 15 May 1839. The entire population of Port Philip in 1841 was 11,738 and the Catholics numbered 2,411.

The oldest surviving Catholic church in Victoria, St Francis Catholic Church, was built in 1841.

The Diocese of Melbourne was created in 1848 out of the territory of the then Sydney archdiocese, with James Alipius Goold as its first bishop. The Catholic population of the colony was 18,000 in 1851 and had grown to 88,000 by 1857 as a result of the gold rush. James Goold was also instrumental in setting up many Catholic schools in the diocese and in introducing several religious orders devoted to education and works of charity, including the Society of Jesus, the Christian Brothers, the Sisters of Mercy, the Good Shepherd Nuns, the Presentation Sisters, the Faithful Companions of Jesus and the Little Sisters of the Poor.

When Goold was appointed Bishop of Melbourne in 1848, St Francis' Church became the cathedral church of the new diocese. Construction of a new church on Eastern Hill in East Melbourne commenced in 1858, to be called St Patrick's Cathedral. Construction of the cathedral was not completed until 1939.

On 30 March 1874, the dioceses of Sandhurst (comprising four parishes) and Ballarat were formed out of territory of the Diocese of Melbourne, with it becoming a metropolitan archdiocese of the Ecclesiastical Province of Melbourne and responsible for Sandhurst and Ballarat dioceses as suffragan dioceses. The suffragan Diocese of Sale was similarly formed on 26 April 1887 out of the archdiocese.

Under Goold's successor, Thomas Joseph Carr, additional teaching orders were introduced to the archdiocese, including the Marist Brothers, the Sisters of Charity, the Sisters of St Joseph of the Sacred Heart, the Sisters of Loreto, the Sisters of St. Joseph and the Sisters of the Good Samaritan. In 1887, 11,661 pupils attended Catholic schools of the archdiocese and that number had grown to 25,369 by 1908. The Catholic population of the archdiocese according to government census returns of 1901 was 145,333.

Until the mid-20th century, the Catholics of the archdiocese were almost all Irish or of Irish origin, when expansion of the migration programs saw the arrival of non-Irish Catholics from continental Europe. The priesthood was exclusively Irish until the early part of the 20th century, when training of native born priests began.

== Ordinaries ==
The following individuals were Archbishops of Melbourne, with one being a cardinal while in office as archbishop, as well as having civilian honours. Their highest title is shown here:

Order	Name	Title	Date enthroned	Reign ended	Term of office	Reason for term end
1	James Goold, OSA †	Bishop of Melbourne	9 July 1847	31 March 1874	26 years, 265 days	Elevated to Archbishop of Melbourne
1	James Goold, OSA †	Archbishop of Melbourne	31 March 1874	11 June 1886	12 years, 72 days	Died in office
2	Thomas Joseph Carr †	Archbishop of Melbourne	29 September 1886	6 May 1917	30 years, 219 days	Died in office
2	Thomas Joseph Carr †	Bishop of the Military Ordinariate of Australia	1912	1917	5 years	Resigned
3	Daniel Mannix †	Coadjutor Archbishop of Melbourne	1 July 1912	6 May 1917	4 years, 309 days	Elevated to Archbishop of Melbourne
3	Daniel Mannix †	Archbishop of Melbourne	6 May 1917	6 November 1963	46 years, 184 days	Died in office
3	Daniel Mannix †	Bishop of the Military Ordinariate of Australia	6 May 1917	6 November 1963	46 years, 184 days	Died in office
4	Justin Simonds †	Coadjutor Archbishop of Melbourne	6 September 1942	6 November 1963	21 years, 61 days	Elevated to Archbishop of Melbourne
4	Justin Simonds †	Archbishop of Melbourne	6 November 1963	13 May 1967	3 years, 188 days	Retired and appointed Archbishop Emeritus of Melbourne
5	James Cardinal Knox †	Archbishop of Melbourne	13 April 1967	1 July 1974	4 years, 309 days	Elevated to Prefect of the Congregation for Sacraments and Divine Worship
5	James Cardinal Knox †	Cardinal-Priest of Santa Maria in Vallicella	5 March 1973	26 June 1983	10 years, 113 days	Died in office
5	James Cardinal Knox †	Prefect of the Congregation for Sacraments and Divine Worship	25 January 1974	4 August 1981	7 years, 191 days	Elevated to the President of the Pontifical Council for the Family
5	James Cardinal Knox †	President of the Pontifical Council for the Family	4 August 1981	26 June 1983	1 year, 326 days	Died in office
6	Sir Frank Little, KBE †	Auxiliary Bishop of Melbourne	16 November 1972	1 July 1974	1 year, 227 days	Elevated to Archbishop of Melbourne
6	Sir Frank Little, KBE †	Archbishop of Melbourne	1 July 1974	16 July 1996	22 years, 15 days	Resigned and appointed Archbishop Emeritus of Melbourne
7	George Cardinal Pell, AC †	Auxiliary Bishop of Melbourne	30 March 1987	16 July 1996	9 years, 108 days	Elevated to Archbishop of Melbourne
7	George Cardinal Pell, AC †	Archbishop of Melbourne	6 July 1996	26 March 2001	4 years, 253 days	Elevated to Archbishop of Sydney
8	Denis Hart	Auxiliary Bishop of Melbourne	10 November 1997	22 June 2001	3 years, 224 days	Elevated to Archbishop of Melbourne
8	Denis Hart	Archbishop of Melbourne	22 June 2001	1 August 2018	17 years, 40 days	Retirement and appointed Archbishop Emeritus of Melbourne
9	Peter Comensoli	Bishop of Broken Bay	12 December 2014	31 July 2018	3 years, 231 days	Elevated to Archbishop of Melbourne
9	Peter Comensoli	Archbishop of Melbourne	1 August 2018	present	8 years, 97 days	n/a

== Auxiliary bishops ==
=== Current auxiliary bishops ===
The archbishop of the archdiocese, Peter Comensoli, is assisted by several auxiliary bishops:

- Martin Ashe (2021–present)
- Thinh Xuan Nguyen (2024–present)

Monsignor Greg Bennet was appointed vicar general and moderator of the curia of the archdiocese in February 2012.

=== Former auxiliary bishops ===
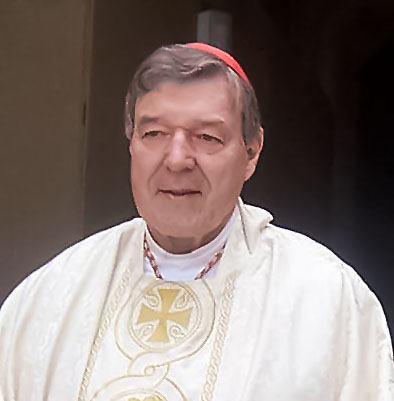
Pell in 2006

- Arthur Francis Fox † (1956–1967), appointed Bishop of Sale
- Lawrence Patrick Moran † (1964–1970)
- John Neil Cullinane † (1967–1974)
- Thomas Francis Little † (1972–1974), appointed Archbishop here
- John Anthony Kelly † (1972–1986)
- Eric Gerard Perkins † (1972–1991)
- Joseph Peter O'Connell † (1976–2006)
- George Pell (1987–1996) †, appointed Archbishop here; future Cardinal
- Peter Joseph Connors (1987–1997), appointed Bishop of Ballarat
- Hilton Forrest Deakin (1992–2007)
- Denis James Hart (1997–2001), appointed Archbishop here
- Joseph Angelo Grech † (1998–2001), appointed Bishop of Sandhurst
- Mark Benedict Coleridge (2002–2006), appointed Archbishop of Canberra–Goulburn
- Christopher Charles Prowse (2003–2009), appointed Bishop of Sale
- Peter John Elliott † (2007-2018)
- Terence Curtin (2014-2025)
- Mark Stuart Edwards OMI (2014–2020), appointed Bishop of Wagga Wagga
- Anthony Ireland (2021-2025), appointed Archbishop of Hobart
- Rene A. Ramirez, RCJ (2024–2026), appointed Bishop of Sandhurst

Bishop Tim Costelloe SDB was appointed as an auxiliary bishop on 30 April 2007 with responsibility for the northern region of the archdiocese. On 20 February 2012, Pope Benedict XVI elevated him to Archbishop of Perth, Western Australia.

Bishop Les Tomlinson was the auxiliary bishop for the Eastern Region. He was appointed auxiliary bishop on 5 May 2009 and continued until he was installed as Bishop of Sandhurst in March 2012.

Bishop Vincent Long Van Nguyen OFM Conv was the auxiliary bishop for the western region and former assistant superior general for the Conventual Franciscans for Asia and Oceania. He was appointed auxiliary bishop on 20 May 2011 and continued until he was appointed Bishop of Parramatta on 5 May 2016 and installed on 16 June 2016.

Bishop Mark Stuart Edwards OMI was the auxiliary bishop for the Western Region, having been appointed bishop on 7 Nov 2014. He was appointed Bishop of Wagga Wagga on 26 May 2020.

== Other priests of this diocese who became bishops ==
- James Moore †, appointed Bishop of Ballarat in 1884
- James Francis Corbett †, appointed Bishop of Sale in 1887
- Joseph Shiel †, appointed Bishop of Rockhampton in 1912
- Patrick Phelan †, appointed Bishop of Sale in 1912
- John Barry †, appointed Bishop of Goulburn in 1924
- James Patrick O'Collins †, appointed Bishop of Geraldton in 1930
- Romuald Denis Hayes, S.S.C. †, appointed Bishop of Rockhampton in 1932
- John Joseph Lonergan † appointed Bishop of Port Augusta in 1938 (did not take effect, apparently because of his death)
- Matthew Beovich †, appointed Archbishop of Adelaide in 1939
- Patrick Francis Lyons †, appointed Bishop of Christchurch, New Zealand in 1944
- Bernard Denis Stewart †, appointed Coadjutor Bishop of Sandhurst in 1946
- Ronald Austin Mulkearns †, appointed Coadjutor Bishop of Ballarat in 1968
- John Aloysius Morgan †, appointed Auxiliary Bishop of Canberra (and Goulburn) in 1969
- Leo Morris Clarke †, appointed Bishop of Maitland in 1976
- Joseph Eric D'Arcy †, appointed Bishop of Sale in 1981
- Luc Julian Matthys, appointed Bishop of Armidale in 1999
- Gregory Charles Bennet, appointed Bishop of Sale in 2020

== Other information ==
There are 232 parishes in the archdiocese and 369 diocesan priests and 16 permanent deacons. The archdiocese has a total of 294 priests and one permanent deacon in religious orders, 199 religious brothers and 1,323 religious sisters.

There is one seminary for diocesan clergy, Corpus Christi College, and three seminaries for religious clergy.

There are 331 Catholic schools in the archdiocese - 256 primary, 69 secondary and six special schools. According to the 1998 census, there were 136,387 students enrolled in Catholic schools in the archdiocese - 77,636 in primary schools and 58,751 in secondary schools.

Within the archdiocese, there are 10 Catholic hospitals, 18 homes for children, 27 for the elderly and 10 for other purposes.

== Sexual abuse cases ==
Cases of sexual abuse in the Catholic Church have come to light in recent years involving the Archdiocese of Melbourne as well as many regional Catholic jurisdictions, both in Australia and around the world. Archbishop Denis Hart was cross-examined for three hours at the Parliamentary Inquiry over documents sent to the inquiry by victims and whistleblowers within the archdiocese.

Hart regretted the "slow start" made in the process of resolving complaints and investigating instances of abuse but "st[ood] by what [they] did since 1996 nevertheless".

The inquiry's report was due to be delivered to the Victorian parliament in September 2013.

In May 2020, newly disclosed portions of the Royal Commission into Institutional Responses to Child Sexual Abuse report, which was originally published in redacted form in December 2017, revealed that priests and clergy staff accused of abusing children within the Archdiocese of Melbourne were sometimes "dealt with" by being transferred to other parishes.

== See also ==
- Roman Catholicism in Australia
