= Frank Little (bishop) =

Catholic archbishop of Melbourne, Australia

The Most Reverend Sir Frank Little KBE
- 6th Archbishop of Melbourne
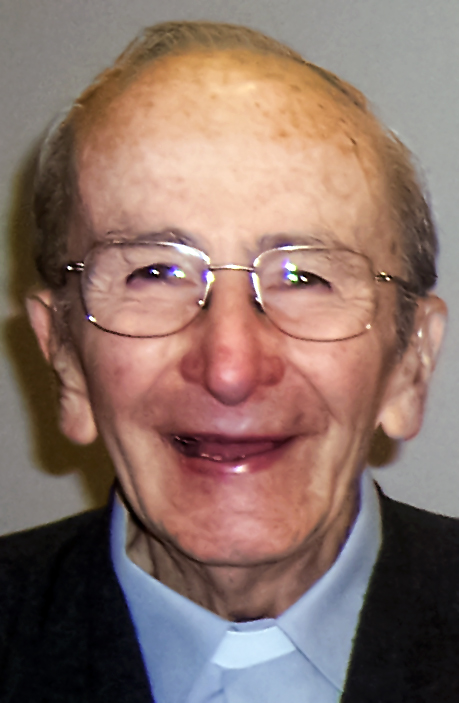
- Little in 2006
- Diocese: Melbourne
- Installed: 1 July 1974
- Term ended: 16 July 1996
- Predecessor: James Knox
- Successor: George Pell

Orders
- Ordination: 3 October 1950 (Priest) in Propaganda Fide College, Rome, by Pietro Fumasoni Biondi
- Consecration: 21 February 1973 by James Knox

Personal details
- Born: Thomas Francis Little; 30 November 1925 Melbourne, Victoria, Australia
- Died: 7 April 2008 (aged 82) Melbourne
- Buried: St Patrick's Cathedral, Melbourne
- Denomination: Roman Catholic
- Occupation: Cleric
- Profession: Roman Catholic bishop
- Education: Corpus Christi College, Melbourne; Propaganda Fide, Rome; Pontifical Urban University

Styles of Sir Frank Little
- Reference style: The Most Reverend
- Spoken style: Your Grace
- Religious style: Archbishop

Sir Thomas Francis Little (30 November 1925 – 7 April 2008 (Note: Brolly 2008 and Zwartz 2008 both say Little died on 7 April. Note that a death notice placed in The Age newspaper by "the Bishops, Priests and people of the Archdiocese of Melbourne" stated that Little "died peacefully at home on the [morning of] 8 April 2008" (The Age, 10 April 2008, page 13).)) was an Australian bishop. He was the sixth Roman Catholic Archbishop of Melbourne. He was appointed by Pope Paul VI on 1 July 1974 and retired in 1996; he was succeeded by the Most Reverend George Pell (as he was styled at the time). On retirement he was styled archbishop emeritus in the Archdiocese of Melbourne. The Royal Commission into Institutional Responses to Child Sexual Abuse found that Little had led a culture of secrecy in the Melbourne archdiocese designed to hide complaints against several priests and protect the church's reputation from scandal.

== Life and career ==
=== Early life and background ===
Little's father, Gerald Thompson Little, was a surveyor and engineer and his mother was Kathleen Annie McCormack. Both were from metropolitan Melbourne. Little was educated at St Columba's School, Essendon, then at St Monica's Christian Brothers College, Moonee Ponds. He completed his secondary education as a boarder at St Patrick's College, Ballarat.

=== Early priesthood ===
Little commenced training for the priesthood in 1943. In that year he entered Corpus Christi College, a seminary at Werribee. Little went to Rome in 1947 to study at the Propaganda Fide College. He was ordained by Cardinal Pietro Fumasoni Biondi, Prefect of the Sacred Congregation for the Propagation of the Faith, on 3 October 1950 in the chapel of the college. For the next three years he studied for a doctorate at the Pontifical Urban University in Rome. He was awarded a doctorate in 1953.

In 1953, Little returned to Melbourne. He was appointed assistant priest to Carlton, then appointed assistant at St Patrick's Cathedral, Melbourne in 1955. From 1956 until 1959 he worked as secretary to the apostolic delegate, Archbishop Carboni, in Sydney. In 1959, Little again returned to Melbourne as assistant priest at St Patrick's Cathedral. In 1965 he became the dean of the cathedral and then, in 1971, parish priest of St Ambrose's Brunswick. During these years he was involved in pastoral work with the large number of migrants finding a new home in Australia, especially within the Italian community. He was also a lecturer at the provincial seminary, a member of the Diocesan Ecumenical Affairs Commission, a member and chair of Victorian Action for World Development, a member of the organising committee for the Melbourne Eucharistic Congress and episcopal vicar for the apostolate of the laity.

=== Episcopate ===
Little was consecrated a bishop on 21 February 1973 by the Most Reverend James Knox, Archbishop of Melbourne (later created, in March 1973, Cardinal Knox), during the International Eucharistic Congress then being held in Melbourne. In 1973 he was appointed as an auxiliary bishop of Melbourne and Titular Bishop of Temuniana. He lived in Moonee Ponds as both a parish priest and a regional bishop with pastoral responsibility for the north-western region of Melbourne. In 1974, he succeeded Cardinal Knox as Archbishop of Melbourne upon Knox's appointment as Prefect of the Congregation for Divine Worship and the Discipline of the Sacraments.

In 1983, Little attended the Synod of Bishops in Rome, themed "Reconciliation". During his time as Archbishop of Melbourne his support of the education and renewal for the Catholic community expressed itself in such initiatives as the publication of the religious education guidelines, the launch of the RENEW program, the establishment of deaneries, and the "Tomorrow's Church" process. Little was committed to the continuing formation of laity and priests. He was known in Melbourne for his support for the Essendon Football Club. In July 1996 his resignation from the office of archbishop, for reasons of health, was accepted by the Pope.

In the 1977 Silver Jubilee honours he was appointed a Knight Commander of the Order of the British Empire (KBE). On 10 April 1992 he was awarded an honorary doctorate in theology by the Melbourne College of Divinity, particularly for his work for ecumenism and theological education in the archdiocese.

In 2002 there were media reports that Little failed to address issues associated with the sexual abuse scandal in the Catholic archdiocese of Melbourne, specifically relating to Father Wilfred "Billy" Baker, of Gladstone Park, Eltham and North Richmond parishes.

In 2013, the Victorian Parliamentary Inquiry into abuse of children was told by Archbishop Denis Hart that Little had covered up paedophile priests and moved them to other parishes where they would abuse again.

The Royal Commission into Institutional Responses to Child Sexual Abuse concluded that Little had "dismissed or ignored serious allegations of child sexual abuse against a number of priests" between 1974 and 1996.

St Patrick's College in Ballarat has stated that it would remove Little's name from a building which had been named in his honour and revoke his status as an inducted "Legend of the College".

== Death ==
Little died in April 2008 and was buried in the crypt of St Patrick's Cathedral, Melbourne.

== Notes ==
Catholic Church titles
Preceded by James Knox	Archbishop of Melbourne; 1974–1996	Succeeded by George Pell
