= Daniel Mannix =

Irish-born Catholic Archbishop of Melbourne

The Most Reverend Daniel Mannix
- Archbishop of Melbourne
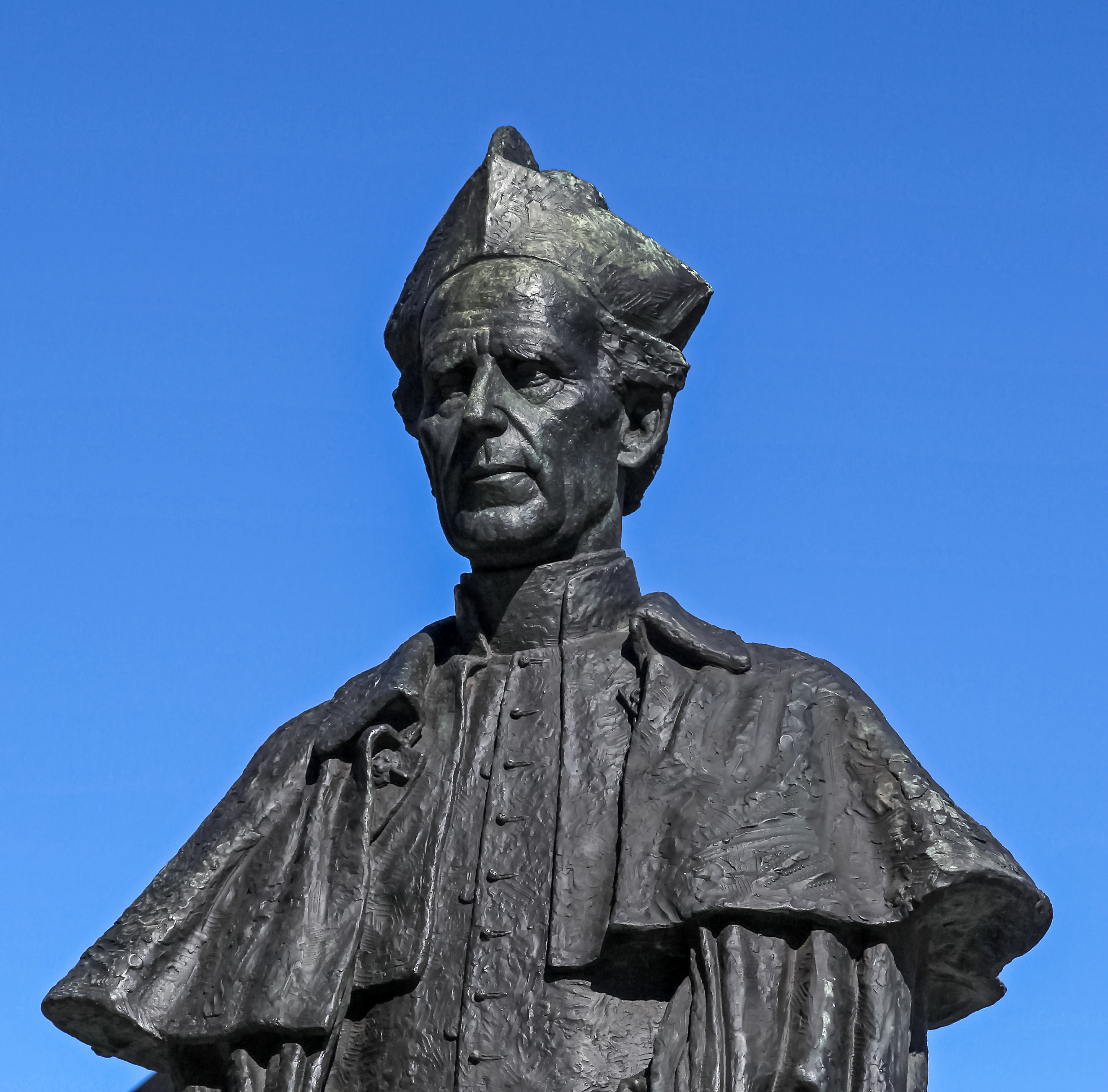
- Statue of Mannix outside St Patrick's Cathedral, Melbourne
- Diocese: Melbourne
- Installed: 6 May 1917
- Term ended: 6 November 1963
- Predecessor: Thomas Carr
- Successor: Justin Simonds
- Other post: Bishop of the Armed Services (1917–1963)

Orders
- Ordination: 9 June 1890
- Consecration: 6 October 1912

Personal details
- Born: 4 March 1864 Charleville, County Cork, Ireland
- Died: 6 November 1963 (aged 99) Melbourne, Victoria, Australia
- Buried: St Patrick's Cathedral, Melbourne
- Denomination: Roman Catholic
- Parents: Timothy Mannix, Ellen Mannix (née Cagney)
- Occupation: Cleric
- Education: St Patrick's College, Maynooth

Styles of Daniel Mannix
- Reference style: The Most Reverend
- Spoken style: Your Grace
- Religious style: Archbishop

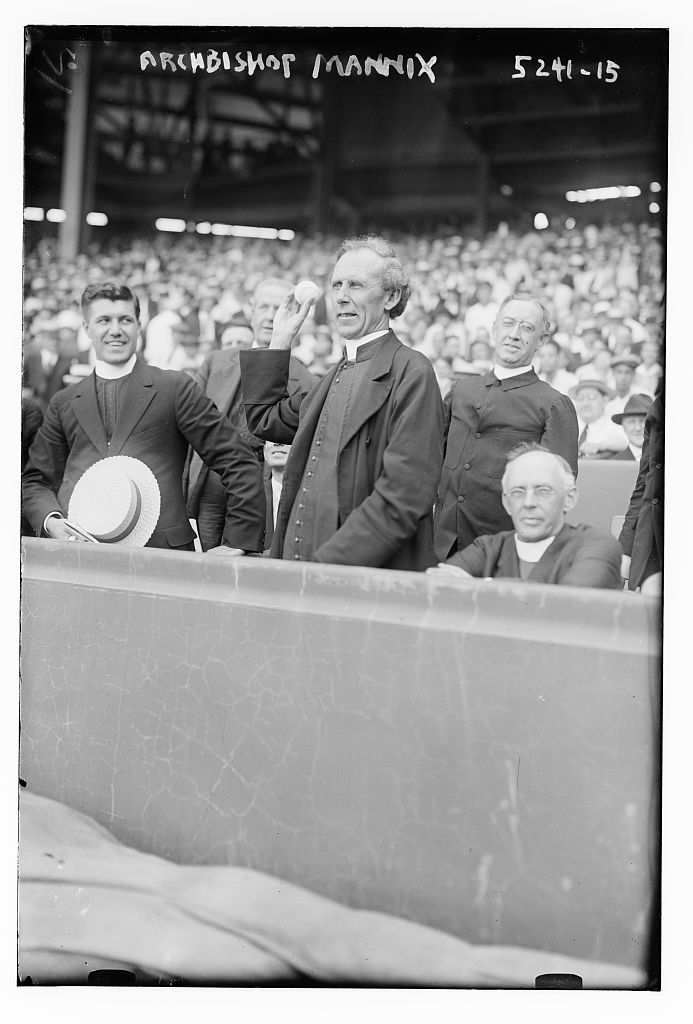
Mannix throwing out the first ball at Polo Grounds on 1 August 1920

Daniel Patrick Mannix (4 March 1864 – 6 November 1963) was an Irish-born Australian Catholic bishop. Mannix was the Archbishop of Melbourne for 46 years and one of the most influential public figures in 20th-century Australia.

== Early life and education ==
Born near Charleville, County Cork in Ireland, Mannix was the son of a tenant farmer, Timothy Mannix, and his wife Ellen (née Cagney). He was educated at St. Colman's College, Fermoy, and then completed his seminary studies at St Patrick's College, Maynooth, where he was ordained as a priest in 1890.

Mannix was a teacher at St Patrick's College, Maynooth, the Irish national seminary, later vice president and finally president. He served as president of St Patrick's College, from 13 October 1903 to 10 August 1912 when he was succeeded by the Rt Reverend John F. Hogan. During his presidency, he welcomed both Edward VII in 1903 and George V in 1911 with loyal displays, which attracted criticism by supporters of the Irish Home Rule movement. Mannix was also involved in the controversy surrounding the dismissal of Father Michael O'Hickey as Professor of Irish after O'Hickey publicly attacked those members of the senate of the National University of Ireland who opposed making Irish a compulsory subject for matriculation and insinuated that the senators (who included several bishops) had sinned grievously by so doing and resembled those MPs who were bribed to pass the Act of Union.

== Ecclesiastical career ==
On 1 July 1912, Mannix was consecrated titular bishop of Pharsalia and coadjutor bishop to Archbishop Carr of Melbourne at Maynooth College Chapel. Mannix was not consulted about his appointment. Melbourne was one of the large centres of Irish emigration, where the Roman Catholic Church was almost entirely Irish. In Australia at this time, the Irish Catholics were commonly treated with disdain by the English and Scottish majority (who were mostly Anglicans and Presbyterians respectively) and also as potentially disloyal. Mannix was regarded with suspicion from the start and his militant advocacy on behalf of a separate Roman Catholic school system, in defiance of the general acceptance of a secular school system, made him immediately a figure of controversy.

In 1914, Australia entered World War I on the side of the United Kingdom and when Mannix denounced the war as "just a sordid trade war", he was widely denounced as a traitor. When the Australian Labor Party government of Billy Hughes tried to introduce conscription for the war, Mannix campaigned against it and it was defeated. He spoke out more frequently about the 1917 referendum, which was also defeated. This campaign included a speech before a huge crowd of perhaps 100,000 at the Richmond Racecourse, which was provided by John Wren. The extent to which Mannix influenced the outcome of the vote has been debated widely. When the Labor Party split over conscription, Mannix supported the Catholic-dominated anti-conscription faction, led by Frank Tudor (although Tudor was not a Catholic). Among the Catholic politicians whose careers he encouraged were James Scullin, Frank Brennan, Joseph Lyons and, later, Arthur Calwell. In 1917, when Carr died, Mannix became Archbishop of Melbourne.

== Views ==
Mannix opposed the Easter Rising in 1916 and always condemned the use of force by Irish nationalists. He also counselled Australians of Irish Catholic extraction to stay out of Irish politics. He became, however, increasingly radicalised and in October 1920 led an Irish republican funeral cortège through the streets of London following the death of the hunger striker Terence MacSwiney, the Lord Mayor of Cork City in Mannix's native county. He was involved in the production of the film Ireland Will Be Free.

In 1920, Mannix travelled from Melbourne to San Francisco and then by train he journeyed to New York in order to take passage on the White Star Line ship the RMS Baltic to Ireland. A rally reported to be made up of 15,000 Irish-American New Yorkers was organised on 31 July at the White Star Line docks at Pier 60, Chelsea Piers on the West side of New York. This show of support was to send off Mannix, who had been so outspoken on British rule in Ireland, and successfully led anti-conscription campaigns during World War I. The rally ensured that David Lloyd George would allow Mannix passage to Ireland. However, shortly before the RMS Baltic was due to arrive in Cork Harbour, it was stopped by two Royal Navy destroyers, whose crews boarded the ship and detained Mannix before depositing him at Penzance, Cornwall.

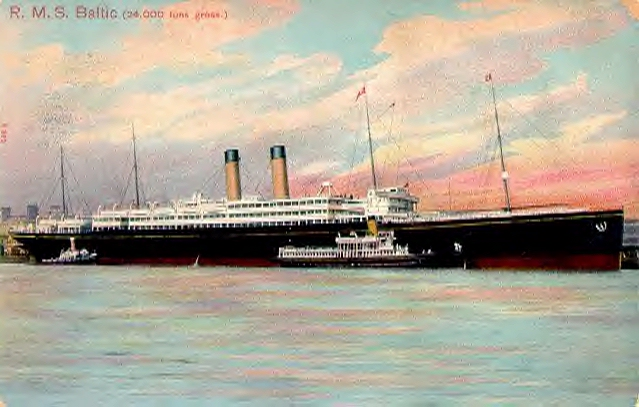
RMS Baltic, from which Mannix was arrested and sent to Penzance, Cornwall

By the end of the war, Mannix was the recognised leader of the Irish community in Australia, idolised by Catholics but detested by others, including those in power federally and in Victoria. He had spoken against the Treaty of Versailles, saying it would lead to a greater war than the one just ended. For many years he was ostracised and not invited to the official functions his position would have entitled him to attend. Mannix formed the Irish Relief Fund, which provided financial support for the families of Irish people who were killed or imprisoned during the Irish War of Independence. When he left Australia in 1920 to visit Rome and the United States, the British government refused him permission to visit Ireland or British cities with large Irish populations, which resulted in an extended stay in Penzance. There was also a serious, though unsuccessful, move to prevent him from returning to Australia.

Mannix supported trade unionism but opposed militancy and strikes. In the 1920s he became outspoken in opposition to the Industrial Workers of the World and the Communist Party of Australia. On all matters of personal and sexual morality, he was a traditionalist and an upholder of the authority of the Church.

In Melbourne, Mannix was the leader of the city's largest ethnic minority as well as a religious leader. From his palatial house, "Raheen", in Kew, Melbourne, he would daily walk to and from St Patrick's Cathedral, personally greeting any of his flock that he encountered. On official engagements, he was chauffeured about in a large limousine. In 1920 he led large Saint Patrick's Day parade with a guard of honour made up of Irish Australian winners of the Victoria Cross.

After the Irish Free State was created in 1922, Mannix became less politically controversial and animosity to him gradually faded for the most part. From the 1930s, he came to see Communism as the main threat to the church and he became increasingly identified with political conservatism. He was a strong supporter of Joseph Lyons, who left the Labor Party in 1931 and led the conservative United Australia Party in government from 1932 until 1939, although he continued to support Catholics in the Labor Party such as Arthur Calwell.

Mannix's best-known protégé in his later years was B. A. Santamaria, a young Italian-Australian lawyer, whom Mannix appointed head of the national secretariat of Catholic Action in 1937. After 1941, Mannix authorised Santamaria to form the Catholic Social Studies Movement, known simply as "The Movement", to organise in the unions and defeat the Communists. "The Movement" was so successful in its efforts that by 1949 it had taken control of the Victorian branch of the Labor Party. Another associate was William Hackett SJ, a Jesuit priest from Ireland, who had been involved in the Easter Rising and Irish Civil War before being posted to Australia.

In 1951 the Liberal government of Robert Menzies held a referendum to give the government the constitutional power to ban the Communist Party. Mannix surprised many of his supporters by opposing this, on the grounds that the bill was totalitarianism, which in his view was worse than communism: his may have been a decisive influence in the referendum's narrow defeat. This alliance with the Labor leader, H. V. Evatt, was short-lived.

The Labor Party split again in 1954 over attitudes to Communism and the Cold War. Santamaria's supporters were expelled and formed the Democratic Labor Party (DLP). Mannix covertly supported the DLP and allowed many priests and religious to work openly for it. This involvement in politics was opposed by Cardinal Sir Norman Gilroy, Archbishop of Sydney, who worked with the Catholic Premier of New South Wales, Joseph Cahill, to hold together the Labor Party in that state, and also by the Vatican which, in 1957, ruled that the Movement should not interfere in politics. Rome appointed Archbishop Justin Simonds as coadjutor to Mannix – Simonds was widely seen as Rome's man in Melbourne.

In the late 1940s and 1950s, Mannix spoke against the White Australia policy, which was in effect at the time. He described the policy as "crude" and said that Australia had much to learn from other races. In his opposition to the policy, Mannix stated in 1949 that "there is no colour bar in Australia".

He continued his friendship with long-time Irish leader Éamon de Valera, with the two men continuing their correspondence when Mannix was aged 98 years.

In 1960, Calwell became Labor leader and sought Mannix's support to bring about a reconciliation between Labor and the DLP, essential if the Menzies government was to be defeated. Some figures in the DLP supported this idea, but Mannix supported Santamaria in his resistance to such suggestions. The negotiations fell through and Menzies was re-elected in 1961. Mannix and Calwell became permanently estranged.

By the 1960s the distinct identity of the Irish community in Melbourne was fading, and Irish Catholics were increasingly outnumbered by Italian, Croatian, Polish, Maltese and other postwar immigrant Catholic communities. Mannix, who turned 90 in 1954, remained active and in full authority, but he was no longer a central figure in the city's politics.

== Death ==
Mannix died suddenly on 7 November 1963, aged 99, while he was preparing to celebrate his 100th birthday. A requiem mass was held at St Patrick's Cathedral, Melbourne on Tuesday 12 November. He was buried in the crypt of St Patrick's Cathedral.

It was reported that over 2,000 bishops recited prayers for him in the Ecumenical Council in the Vatican when his death was announced.

== Legacy ==
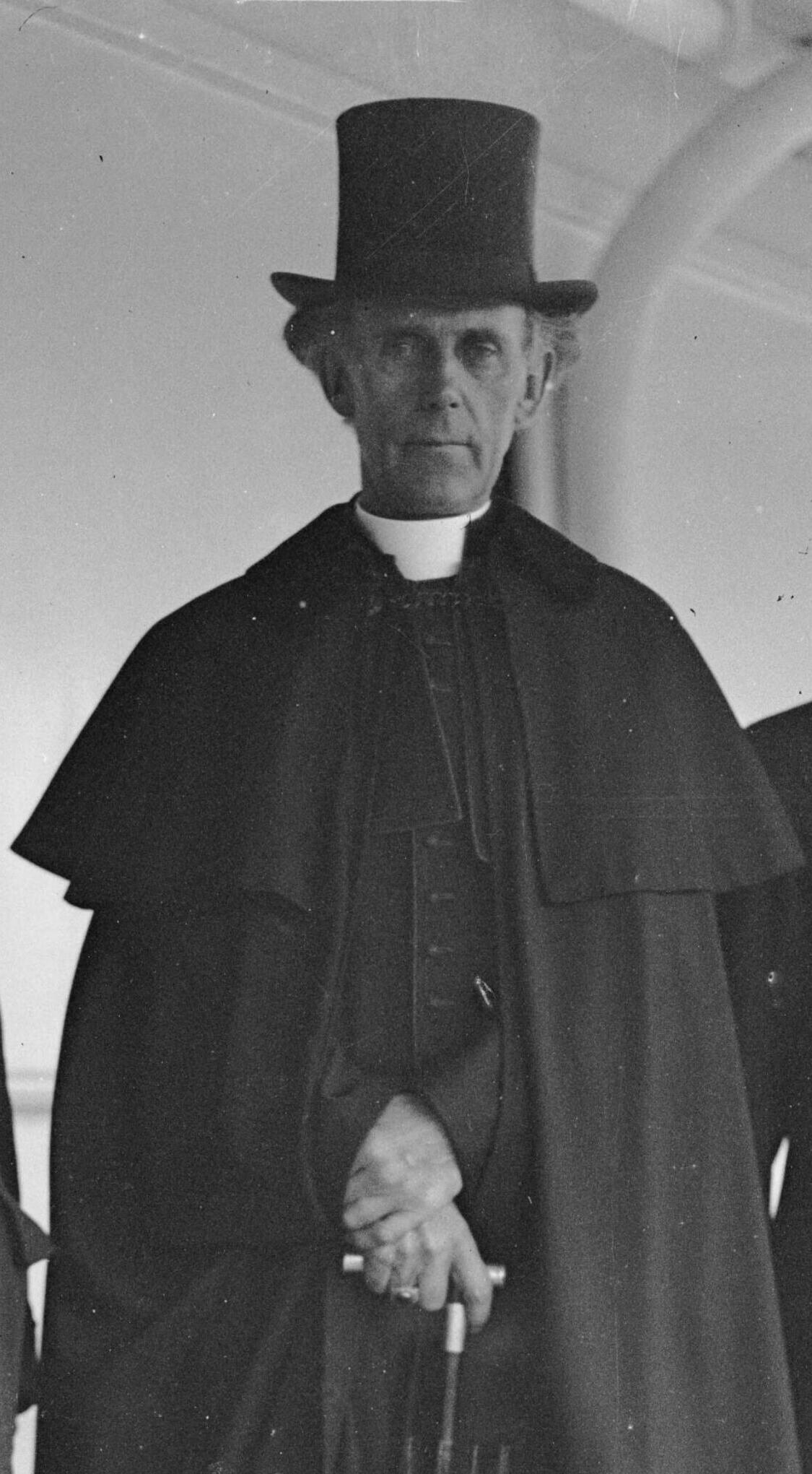
Mannix in 1926

Mannix's legacy to the Roman Catholic Church in Australia is substantial. Over fifty years during his episcopacy, the number of archdiocesan parishioners increased from 150,000 to 600,000; churches from 160 to 300; students in Catholic primary schools from 21,792 to 73,695; secondary pupils from 3,126 to 28,395; priests increased by 237, brothers by 181, nuns by 736; 10 new male and 14 female orders were introduced; 10 seminaries and 7 new hospitals, 3 orphanages, homes for delinquents, the blind and deaf, hostels for girls, and a range of other church facilities.

In recognition of his influence across both church and state, the Catholic Church commissioned a statue of Mannix (pictured above) which is located in the forecourt of St Patrick's Cathedral, Melbourne, facing Parliament House. The bronze and marble sculpture was unveiled by the Governor of Victoria, Sir James Gobbo, in March 1999. The statue replaced an existing one of Daniel O'Connell.

A number of facilities are named in his honour, others were established by Mannix, as listed below:

=== Established by Mannix ===
- Corpus Christi College, Australia's oldest surviving seminary, was founded by Mannix on Christmas Day, 1922. Mannix had envisaged a national seminary along the lines of Maynooth, but had to abandon plans to reform St Patrick's Seminary, Manly, New South Wales, when the Holy See ruled in favour of regional seminaries for Australia.
- Tarrawarra Abbey, Yarra Glen, was founded in 1954 under Mannix's episcopacy with archdiocesan assistance.

=== Named in honour of Mannix ===
==== Australia ====
- Newman College at the University of Melbourne holds the annual Archbishop Daniel Mannix Memorial Lecture.
- The Australian Catholic Students Association each hold annual public lectures in his name.
- Mannix College is a residential college at Monash University.
- Mannix was a key supporter of the foundation of St Kevin's College, Melbourne in 1918 and was a guest speaker at its opening Mass of that year. In honour of his influence, a tutor group at the college's Year 9 campus, Waterford, is named Mannix.
- Year 7 and 8 Mannix campus at the Salesian College, Chadstone.
- Mannix Library, Catholic Theological College, Melbourne
- Mannix House at Nazareth College. Mannix House is represented by the colour green from his Irish connections
- Mannix House and Mannix Building at Xavier College in Kew, Melbourne.
- The Daniel Mannix Building in the Australian Catholic University's Melbourne campus houses the university's college of health science.
- Mazenod College, Mulgrave, Victoria, has home rooms named after Mannix.
- Mannix House (with the colour of yellow) at Loyola College, Melbourne

==== Ireland ====
- Dr Mannix Gaelic Athletic Sportsfield is named after him. It is the home sports field for the Charleville Hurling and Football clubs and is one of the premier hurling and football venues in North Cork.
- Dr Mannix Road, Dr Mannix Drive and Dr Mannix Avenue in Salthill, Galway, are named for him.

==== United Kingdom ====
- Nazareth House Camberwell was established in 1929, after Mannix was taken in by the Sisters of Nazareth in Hammersmith, London, when refused entry into Ireland in 1920. A guest room is named in his honour.

=== In literature ===
- In his 1950 novel Power Without Glory, Frank Hardy presented a loose caricature of Mannix in the character of Archbishop Malone. Malone was played by Michael Pate in the book's 1976 miniseries dramatisation.

Preceded by Thomas Carr	Third Catholic Archbishop of Melbourne; 1917–1963	Succeeded by Justin Simonds
Preceded by Thomas Carr	Second Bishop of the Armed Services; 1917–1963	Succeeded by Thomas McCabe
