= James Knox =

Australian Catholic cardinal

His Eminence James Knox GCC
- President of the Pontifical Council for the Family
- Installed: 4 August 1981
- Term ended: 26 June 1983
- Predecessor: Opilio Rossi
- Successor: Edouard Gagnon
- Other posts: 5th Archbishop of Melbourne (1967–1974); Prefect of the Congregation for Divine Worship and the Discipline of the Sacraments (1974–1983)

Orders
- Ordination: 22 December 1941 by Pietro Fumasoni Biondi
- Consecration: 8 November 1953 by Celso Benigno Luigi Costantini
- Created cardinal: 5 March 1973 by Pope Paul VI
- Rank: Santa Maria in Vallicella

Personal details
- Born: James Robert Knox; 2 May 1914 Bayswater, Western Australia, Australia
- Died: 26 June 1983 (aged 69) Rome, Italy
- Buried: St Patrick's Cathedral, Melbourne
- Denomination: Roman Catholic
- Occupation: Cleric
- Education: Pontifical Urbanian Athenaeum
- Motto: Sicut dilexi vos

Styles of James Knox
- Reference style: His Eminence
- Spoken style: Your Eminence
- Informal style: Cardinal
- See: Melitene (titular see)

James Robert Knox GCC (2 March 1914 – 26 June 1983) was an Australian prelate of the Catholic Church. After years as a Vatican diplomat, he served as Archbishop of Melbourne from 1967 to 1974, prefect of the Congregation for Divine Worship and the Discipline of the Sacraments from 1974 to 1981, and president of the Pontifical Council for the Family from 1981 until his death in 1983. Created a cardinal in 1973, he was the first Australian to serve in the Roman Curia.

== Early years ==
Knox was born in Bayswater, Western Australia, the second of three sons of Irish-born parents John and Emily (née Walsh) Knox. His father was a storekeeper and native of Kilkenny, and his mother died when Knox was still a child. He worked as a tailor's apprentice before applying to the Archdiocese of Perth to study for the priesthood. However, he was rejected because the archdiocese did not have a seminary at the time and relied on recruiting priests from Ireland. He was instead accepted at the Benedictine abbey in New Norcia, completing his secondary education at St Ildephonsus' College and entering the abbey's seminary in March 1936.

In September that year, Knox was transferred to the Pontifical Urban University in Rome, an institution belonging to the Congregation for the Evangelization of Peoples to train missionaries. He was ordained a priest on 22 December 1941 by Cardinal Pietro Fumasoni Biondi, the congregation's prefect. Unable to return to Australia during World War II, he remained in Rome and served as chaplain and vice-rector at the Pontifical Urban University. He also pursued his postgraduate studies, earning doctorates in theology (1944) and canon law (1949).

Knox joined the Vatican diplomatic corps a staff member of the Secretariat of State in 1948, serving under Giovanni Battista Montini (later Pope Paul VI). He also worked in the English section of Vatican Radio. In 1950, he was sent to Tokyo as secretary to then-Archbishop Maximilian von Fürstenberg, the newly appointed Apostolic Delegate in Japan. At the same time, he was raised to the rank of privy chamberlain with the title of monsignor.

== Episcopate ==
On 20 July 1953, Knox was appointed Apostolic Delegate to British Africa and titular archbishop of Melitene by Pope Pius XII. He received his episcopal consecration on the following 8 November in Rome from Cardinal Celso Costantini, with Archbishops Filippo Bernardini and Antonio Samorè serving as co-consecrators. During his four years stationed in Mombasa, he worked to increase the number of native Africans among the local Catholic clergy.

Following the death of Archbishop Martin Lucas, Knox was transferred to New Delhi and named Apostolic Internuncio to India on 14 February 1957. He simultaneously served as the Vatican's top diplomat to Myanmar and Sri Lanka. During his tenure, he oversaw a significant expansion of the Catholic Church in India, including the creation of many new dioceses and the development of religious communities like the Missionaries of Charity founded by Mother Teresa. He participated in the Second Vatican Council from 1962 to 1965, and helped organize Pope Paul VI's visit to India in December 1964.

On 13 April 1967, Knox was appointed to succeed Justin Simonds as the fifth Archbishop of Melbourne, despite the fact he had not lived in Australia for 30 years and had no direct pastoral experience. Implementing the decrees of the Second Vatican Council was the driving force of his years in Melbourne. In 1970 he approved the extension of St Patrick's Cathedral's sanctuary to provide the space required for the reformed liturgical rites. The new sanctuary worked admirably for the many ceremonies of the 40th International Eucharistic Congress held in Melbourne in February 1973. Knox reorganised the structure of the archdiocese, establishing four regions headed by auxiliary bishops, the creation of 12 archdiocesan departments headed by episcopal vicars, as well as the establishment of a Senate of Priests and other advisory bodies. During his episcopacy as archbishop, Knox was also instrumental in the creation of the Melbourne College of Divinity and later, some of the constituent parts which became the Australian Catholic University.

== Cardinal ==
Knox was created Cardinal-Priest of Santa Maria in Vallicella by Pope Paul VI in the consistory of 5 March 1973. Less than a year later, on 25 January 1974, he was called to Rome to serve as prefect of two congregations, Discipline of the Sacraments and Divine Worship. These were merged into one body, the Congregation for Divine Worship and the Discipline of the Sacraments, in August 1975. As head of the Vatican office with liturgical oversight, Knox became the first Australian to serve in the Roman Curia.

Knox was one of the cardinal electors who participated in the conclaves of August and October 1978, which selected Popes John Paul I and John Paul II, respectively. After playing a major role in the 1980 bishops synod on the modern Christian family, he was appointed the first president of the reconstituted Pontifical Council for the Family on 4 August 1981, replacing the Committee for the Family. His health began to decline the following year, and in May 1983 he suffered a stroke and collapsed during a meeting at the Vatican. He lay in a coma for two weeks before his death on 26 June at Gemelli Hospital, aged 69. He was buried on 6 July in the crypt of St Patrick's Cathedral in Melbourne.

A 1974 portrait of Knox by Melbourne artist Paul Fitzgerald is held by the cathedral.

== Honours ==
- Grand-Cross of the Order of Christ, Portugal (2 September 1983)

Catholic Church titles
Preceded by Justin Simonds	5th Archbishop of Melbourne; 13 April 1967 – 1 July 1974	Succeeded by Frank Little
Preceded by Paolo Giobbe	Cardinal–Priest of Santa Maria in Vallicella; 5 March 1973 – 26 June 1983	Succeeded by Edward Clancy
Preceded by Martin Lucas	Apostolic Internuncio to India; 14 Feb 1957 – 13 Apr 1967	Succeeded by Giuseppe Caprio
Preceded by Antonio Samoré (as Prefect of the Sacred Congregation for the Discipline of the Sacraments); Arturo Tabera Araoz (as Prefect of the Sacred Congregation for the Divine Worship)	Prefect of the Congregation for Divine Worship and the Discipline of the Sacraments; Congregatio de Cultu Divino et Disciplina Sacramentorum; 1 August 1975 – 4 August 1981	Succeeded by Giuseppe Casoria
Preceded by Opilio Rossi (as President of the Pontifical Committee for the Family)	President of the Pontifical Council for the Family; 4 August 1981 – 26 June 1983	Succeeded by Edouard Gagnon
