= Corpus Christi College, Melbourne =

Corpus Christi College
- College crest
- Location: 180 Drummond Street, Carlton, Victoria, Australia
- Coordinates: 37°48′9″S 144°58′7″E
- Founder: Daniel Mannix
- Established: 1922; 104 years ago
- Gender: Male only
- Rector: Cameron Forbes
- Undergraduates: circa 60
- Tutors: 8
- Chapel: Corpus Christi Chapel
- Website: corpuschristicollege.org.au

Corpus Christi College is the regional seminary (and theologate) of the Roman Catholic dioceses in Victoria and Tasmania, Australia. The seminary was founded by Daniel Mannix on 25 December 1922 at the Werribee Park Mansion (then the Chirnside Mansion) in Werribee.

The seminary is administered by a board of episcopal trustees comprising the archbishops of Melbourne and Hobart, the bishops of Ballarat, Sandhurst and Sale, and the auxiliary bishops of Melbourne. The Archbishop of Melbourne is the permanent chair of the trustees.

== Educational scope ==
Corpus Christi College trains priests for the archdioceses of Melbourne and Hobart and the dioceses of Ballarat, Sandhurst and Sale, as well as the Archdiocese of Adelaide, the Archdiocese of Canberra-Goulburn, the Diocese of Bathurst, the Military Ordinariate of Australia, and the Archdiocese of Hanoi and the Diocese of Vinh in Vietnam. The college attracts male seminarians from Vietnam, the Philippines, India, Sri Lanka, Korea and Myanmar.

The college is located at St George's Church in Carlton, near St Patrick's Cathedral and in proximity to Catholic Theological College, the University of Melbourne and the Australian Catholic University campuses. St George's Church was built in 1855 and, after extensive use as a school, the church now serves as the seminary chapel.

== Notable alumni ==
- Mark Coleridge, an archbishop
- Arthur Fox, a former bishop
- Denis Hart, a former archbishop
- Cardinal George Pell AC, a former archbishop who served as College Rector in the 1980s
- Gerald Ridsdale, a defrocked priest subsequently convicted of charges relating to child sexual abuse

== Former colleges ==
- Corpus Christi, Werribee (built 1923, sold 1973)
- Corpus Christi, Glen Waverley (built 1959, sold 1972), now the Victoria Police Academy (and for years known to former seminarians as "Coppers Christi")
- Corpus Christi, Clayton (occupied 1973-1999)

== Gallery ==
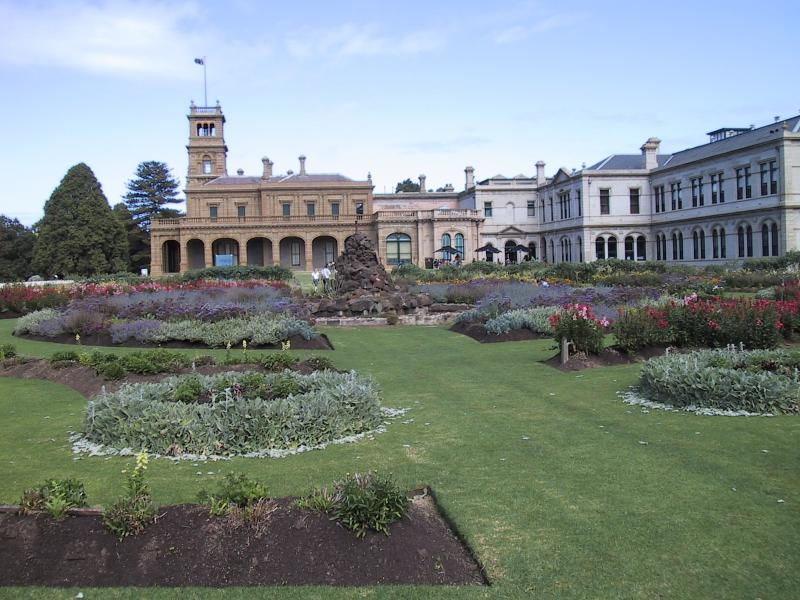
Werribee Park mansion with former Corpus Christi extensions to right.

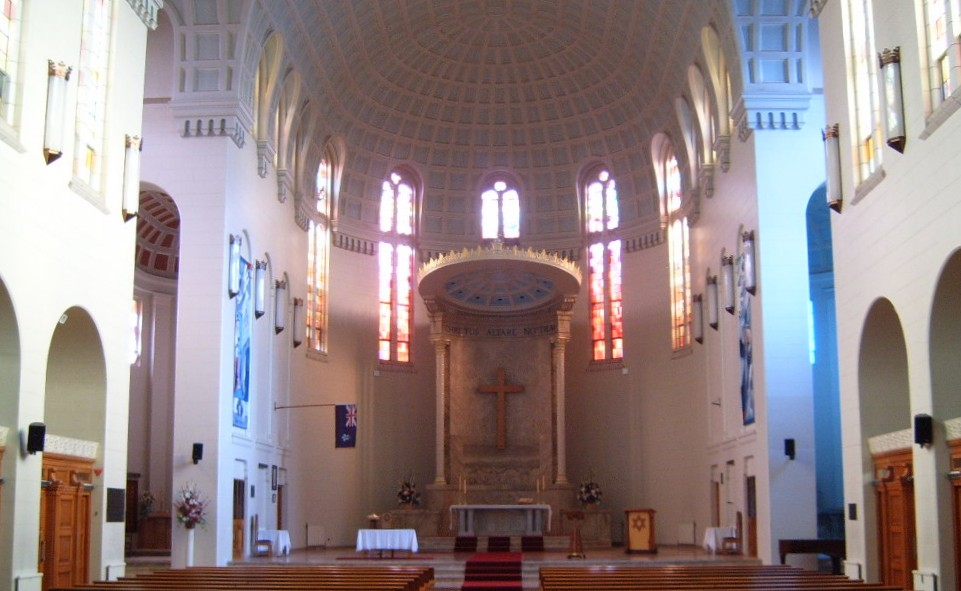
Former Glen Waverley chapel of Corpus Christi College, now the Victoria Police Academy.

== See also ==
- Roman Catholic Church in Australia
