= Moglia (disambiguation) =

Moglia is a municipality in Italy.

Moglia is also a surname. Notable people with the surname include:

- Joe Moglia (born 1949), an American businessman and former football coach
- Luigi Moglia, a 19th-century Italian mosaicist
- Luis Moglia Barth (1903–1984), an Argentine film director
- Oscar Moglia (1935–1989), a Uruguayan basketball Olympian

== See also ==
Mogila (disambiguation)
