= Joseph Grech =

Australian prelate of the Catholic Church (1948–2010)

The Most Reverend Joseph Grech
- Bishop of Sandhurst
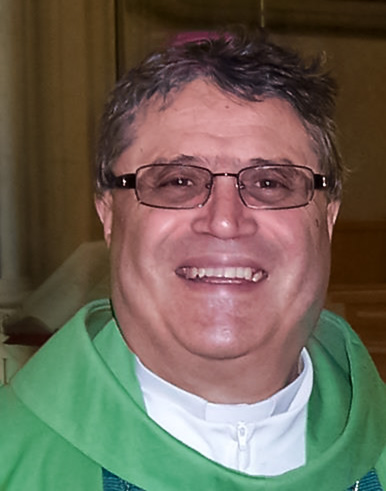
- Church: Catholic Church
- Diocese: Sandhurst
- Appointed: 8 March 2001
- Installed: 27 April 2001
- Term ended: 28 December 2010
- Predecessor: Noel Desmond Daly
- Successor: Les Tomlinson
- Previous post: Auxiliary Bishop of Melbourne (1998–2001)

Orders
- Ordination: 30 November 1974 by Joseph Mercieca
- Consecration: 10 February 1999 by George Pell

Personal details
- Born: 10 December 1948 Balzan Colony of Malta
- Died: 28 December 2010 (aged 62) Melbourne, Victoria, Australia

Joseph Angelo Grech (10 December 1948 – 28 December 2010) was an Australian prelate of the Catholic Church. He was the Bishop of Sandhurst from 2001 to 2010.

== Early life ==
Grech was born in Balzan, Colony of Malta, on 10 December 1948, the eldest of three children. He was educated in Malta and entered the local seminary after graduating high school, where he would study for four years. Archbishop Mikiel Gonzi, Archbishop of Malta, offered to send any of the seminarians to anywhere in the world to complete their priestly studies, and offer seven years service in the diocese of their choice. Grech chose to go to Melbourne, inspired by a visit of Cardinal James Knox to the seminary in Malta.

In January 1971, he moved to Australia to continue his studies for the priesthood at Corpus Christi College, Melbourne for the Archdiocese of Melbourne.

== Priesthood ==
Grech was ordained a priest on 30 November 1974 in Balzan for the Archdiocese of Melbourne by Bishop Joseph Mercieca, before returning to Melbourne to take up parish duties.

He received his first appointment upon returning to Australia, assisting at Northcote. This was followed by appointments at Altona North, Maidstone and Moonee Ponds. He was then appointed Parish Priest of Brunswick East.

In 1989, he was asked by the Archbishop of Melbourne, Thomas Francis Little, to pursue further studies in Rome. He studied spirituality at the Pontifical Gregorian University and returned in 1993, when he was appointed Chaplain to the Catholic Charismatic Renewal. In 1997, he became the Spiritual Director of Corpus Christi College, Melbourne.

== Episcopate ==
On 27 November 1998, Grech was appointed Auxiliary Bishop of Melbourne and Titular Bishop of Belesasa. He was ordained a bishop on 10 February 1999 at St Patrick's Cathedral, Melbourneby Archbishop George Pell. He was assigned to look after the western suburbs of the Archdiocese.

On 8 March 2001, he was appointed the Bishop of Sandhurst, based in the regional Victorian city of Bendigo. He was installed on 27 April.

As bishop, he served as a member of the Bishop's Commission for Pastoral Life with special oversight for the pastoral care of Migrants and Refugees. He was also in charge of youth ministry. He was appointed to the Pontifical Council for the Pastoral Care of Migrants and Itinerants. He was also a member of the Bishops Commission for Mission and Adult Faith Formation with particular responsibilities regarding Catholic Missions. He was also a member of the International Catholic Charismatic Council representing Oceania. He was a much sought after international speaker with particular commitment to the Charismatic Renewal Movement, Priests’ Retreats and to Young People.

He was known for his work as an evangelist, and is described as having sought to share his Christian faith with those around him.

During World Youth Day 2008, he invited Maltese pilgrims to Sacred Heart Cathedral, Bendigo where he celebrated Mass alongside the Archbishop of Malta, Paul Cremona.

He had a strong passion for vocations and invited the people of Sandhurst who were experiencing a stirring in their hearts to dedicate their lives and priests and religious, promising the Diocese would help them mature in this call.

One of his final acts as Bishop was assisting at the ordination of Father Robert Galea, a Maltese-born priest whose journey to ordination mirrored his own.

== Death ==
On 23 December 2010, Grech became ill and on Christmas Eve, was admitted to St Vincent's Hospital, Melbourne, requiring a blood transfusion. On Christmas morning, his condition began to deteriorate and by early afternoon, he was admitted to intensive care. He lost consciousness during the afternoon and would never awaken. He died at 3:00pm on 28 December 2010, from a blood disorder, aged 62.

His funeral was held on 6 January 2011 at Sacred Heart Cathedral, Bendigo and was attended by nearly 5,000 people. He is buried in the crypt of the Cathedral.

Catholic Church titles
Preceded by Noel Desmond Daly	6th Catholic Bishop of Sandhurst; 2001–2010	Succeeded by Les Tomlinson
