= 400th anniversary of Romanov House =

400th Anniversary of the Imperial House of Romanov
- Date: 2013
- Location: Russia Ukraine; Crimea Belgium France
- Type: Quadricentennial Anniversary

2013 (MMXIII) was the year of the 400th Anniversary of the founding of the House of Romanov, Russia's Imperial dynasty. At the date of this anniversary, a number of events were organized on the occasion in Russia and Ukraine marking a grand jubilee in their history. The celebration marks the accession of Mikhail Fyodorovich Romanov (Russian: Михаи́л Фёдорович Рома́нов) to the Russian throne on 11 (21) June 1613 beginning a new ruling dynasty of the Romanovs. The rule of dynasty ended with the abdication of Nicholas II in March 1917. The medal is awarded in three classes: gold, silver and bronze.

== Events ==
=== France ===
Among the celebrations organized around the world, the Romanov Celebration Gala took place in Paris on 5 October 2013 at the Chateau of Chantilly. The event was hosted by Maria Vladimirovna of Russia, Head of the House of Romanov and was presided by her son and heir Grand Duke George Mikhailovich; held with the participation of some Romanov descendants, foreign Royalty and nobility, international business and cultural elite at one of France's most historical venues with the finest second collection of paintings after the Louvre Museum. The chateau hosted three official Imperial visits of the Russian Emperors.

On the occasion France, which has a historic tradition of relations in the Russian history and culture, welcomed the guests coming from the fields of business. This includes media, diplomacy, art and sports from Europe, Ukraine and Russia to spend the exclusive weekend in Paris to pay tribute to the Romanovs and share the emotions of the celebration with luxury leading names and VIP celebrities. Deriving from the Russian imperial traditions of splendid balls, masquerades and other entertainment for aristocrats, the event supported images of Russia and Ukraine on the international arena as the countries which take care of their heritage and therefore, future of their nations.

== Medal ==
400th Anniversary Medal of the House of Romanov
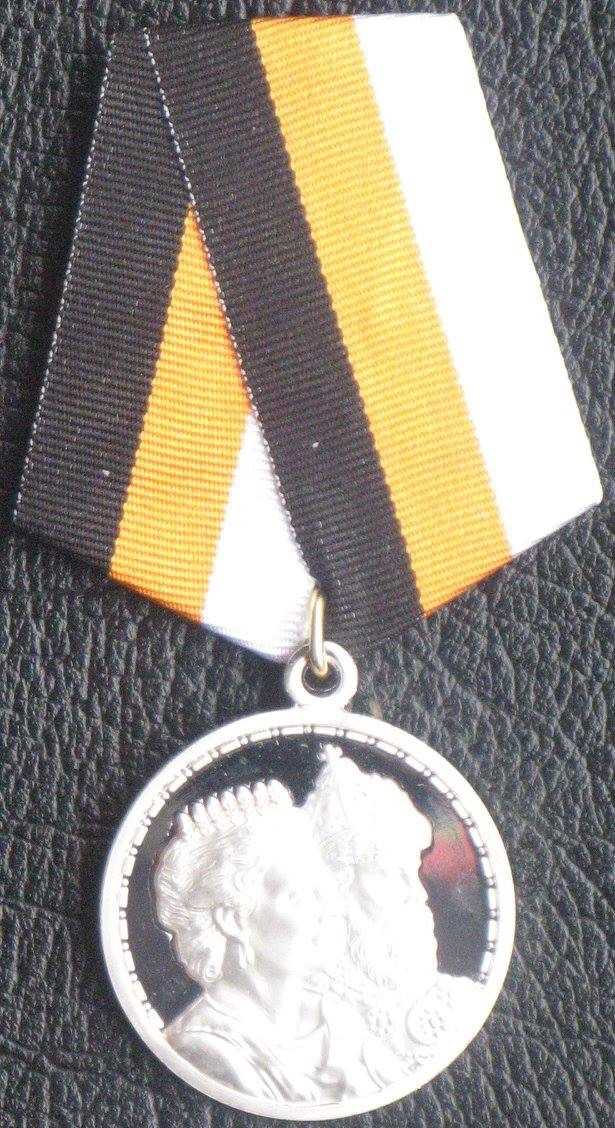
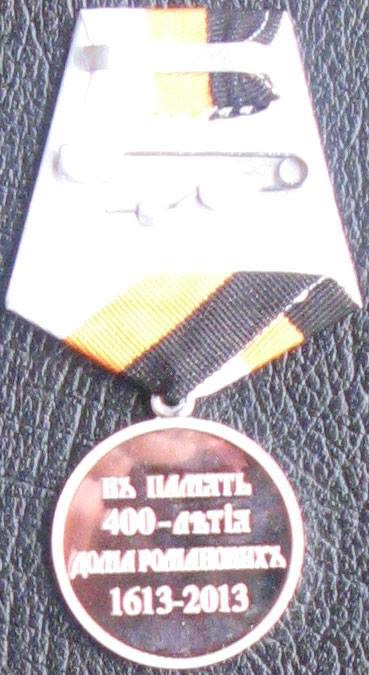
- Obverse (left) and Reverse (right) of the Medal.
- Type: Medal
- Awarded for: Those who have rendered extraordinary service to Russia and to the Russian Imperial House, who have made a significant contribution to the rebirth of the spiritual, scientific, cultural and educational, governmental and national traditions of the country; to the national security of the Fatherland, to the development of the economy, to charitable activities and to the assistance of their poor and underprivileged countrymen, to the strengthening of relations between the peoples of our nation, to the reestablishment of the moral and ethical foundations of our society, and also to the preparations for the celebrations of the 400th anniversary of the ending of the Time of Troubles, the reestablishment of the Russian State, and the all-national election to the throne of the House of Romanov.
- Status: Currently issued
- Established: 5 March 2012
- First award: Grand Duchess Maria Vladimirovna

Order of Wear
- Next (higher): Imperial Order of Saint Michael the Archangel
- Related: 300th Anniversary Medal of the House of Romanov

=== Recipients ===
- Maria Vladimirovna of Russia (2013) - Sovereign
- Grand Duke George Mikhailovich (2013) - Grand Master

=== Russia ===
==== Religious figures ====
- Rawil Gaynetdin, The Grand Mufti of Russia (28 November 2018)

==== Diplomacy ====
- Vladimir Ardalionovich Malygin, Ambassador Extraordinary and Plenipotentiary of the Russian Federation to the Republic of Malta (14 June 2017)

=== Malta ===
- Daniel de Petri Testaferrata, Marquis of San Vincenzo Ferreri, President of the Maltese Association of the Sovereign Military Order of Malta (14 June 2017)
- Andrei Mikhailovich Muraviev, Director of the Russian Centre for Science and Culture in Malta (Rossotrudnichestvo) (15 June 2017)
- Archbishop Charles Scicluna, The Roman Catholic Archbishop of Malta (16 June 2017)
- Peter dei Conti Sant Manduca, Mayor of Mdina (16 June 2017)
- Archpriest Dimitrii Netsvetaev, Former Rector of the Church of Our Lady of Damascus (17 June 2017)
- Archpriest George Mifsud Montanaro, Rector of the Church of Our Lady of Damascus (17 June 2017)
- Joseph Cassar, Maltese Diplomat and Former Ambassador of Malta to the Russian Federation. (17 June 2017)
- Joseph Gauci, Maltese Businessman and Philanthropist. (17 June 2017)

=== Sweden ===
- Jonas Arnell, Phaleristic Expert

=== United States ===
- Archbishop Kyrill Dmitrieff, The Russian Orthodox Archbishop of San Francisco and Western America (14 May 2013)
- Mr Charles A Coulombe, KCStS of Trumau, Austria, contributing scholar for the November 2012 symposium on Pyotr Stolypin in San Francisco
- Prof Robert O Llizo of Houston Christian University, contributing scholar for the November 2012 symposium on Pyotr Stolypin in San Francisco
- Mr J Anthony McAlister, MStJ, FSA Scot, of Los Angeles, California, facilitator of the November 2012 symposium on Pyotr Stolypin in San Francisco

== See also ==
- Romanov Tercentenary
