= Rob Galea =

Maltese Roman Catholic priest and singer

The Reverend Rob Galea
- Born: 14 November 1981 (age 44); Malta
- Genres: Contemporary Catholic liturgical; contemporary Christian music; contemporary worship music
- Occupations: Priest, singer, songwriter

Ecclesiastical career
- Religion: Christianity
- Church: Roman Catholic Church
- Ordained: 5 November 2010
- Congregations served: St Brendan's Catholic Church, Shepparton; St Kilian's Catholic Church, Bendigo

Robert Galea (born 14 November 1981) is a Maltese and Australian Catholic priest and contemporary Christian singer-songwriter.

Galea has released eight music projects, More of You (April 2004), Closer (UK release, February 2006), What A Day (January 2008), "Divine Mercy Chaplet" [Featuring Gary Pinto and Natasha Pinto] (August 2010), "Reach Out" (January 2011) and a live concert DVD and live CD entitled Fr Robert Galea, Reach Out Live (July 2011), "Glorify" Mass setting (August 2013) and "Something About You" (January 2015). Galea has been featured in national newspapers and magazines as well as on TV Channel 10's The Project. He was a contestant on Australia's The X Factor in 2015 but left voluntarily after boot camp due to parish and youthwork commitments. He is the author of Breakthrough (2018), a book published in the United States by Ave Maria Press. A movie deal has been signed for it.

== Early life ==
Robert Galea was born in Malta in 1981. He was raised by strict Catholic parents with two siblings. From the age of 14, he "started frequenting nightclubs in Paceville, a hotspot near his home in eastern Malta, drinking, taking drugs and stealing." At 17 he began learning music. Two years later he was signed to a record label and toured Europe.

== Priesthood ==
Galea entered a seminary at age 21 and, after visiting Australia, in 2006 he migrated there in the following year to continue his studies in Melbourne. In 2008, together with Bishop Joseph Grech, he co-founded the Stronger Youth Program – a series of youth retreats, rallies and small groups – in the Diocese of Sandhurst, Victoria, which was later expanded to Perth and South Australia. He was ordained to the priesthood on 5 November 2010 by Archbishop Paul Cremona. His first parish was at St Brendan's Catholic Church, Shepparton.

Galea is currently an assistant priest at St Kilian's Catholic Church, Bendigo, in the Diocese of Sandhurst. He also served in Bendigo as a chaplain to Catholic College and the local La Trobe University campus. He has a significant evangelistic and outreach ministry, speaking and singing at schools, conferences and churches around Australia and the world. He and his team minister to about 200,000 young people each year.

== Music career ==
Galea's performance career combines music with Christian messages. Galea has written a number of songs for various campaigns and international conferences. He was selected to sing in the international version of the official World Youth Day song, "Receive the Power", along with pop idol Guy Sebastian and soprano, Amelia Farrugia. He performed at events before Pope Benedict XVI in 2011 and an estimated 500,000 pilgrims in Sydney.

Galea was a contestant on the Australian version of the reality TV talent show The X Factor in 2015, but withdrew "after struggling to balance the demands of the show with pastoral commitments". In September 2017, he issued a single, "Dominoes", with Ira Losco. He described it to Rebecca Iversen of The Malta Independent as "a pop song which talks about brokenness of us and all of us. It talks about how we are broken into a million pieces but when these billion of pieces come together, your million my million, they create a work of art.".

In 2020, Galea contributed "Silent Night" to CDB's album Christmas Is Here: The CDB Mixtape.
