= Christmas Eve Procession =

Component of Christmas celebrations in Malta

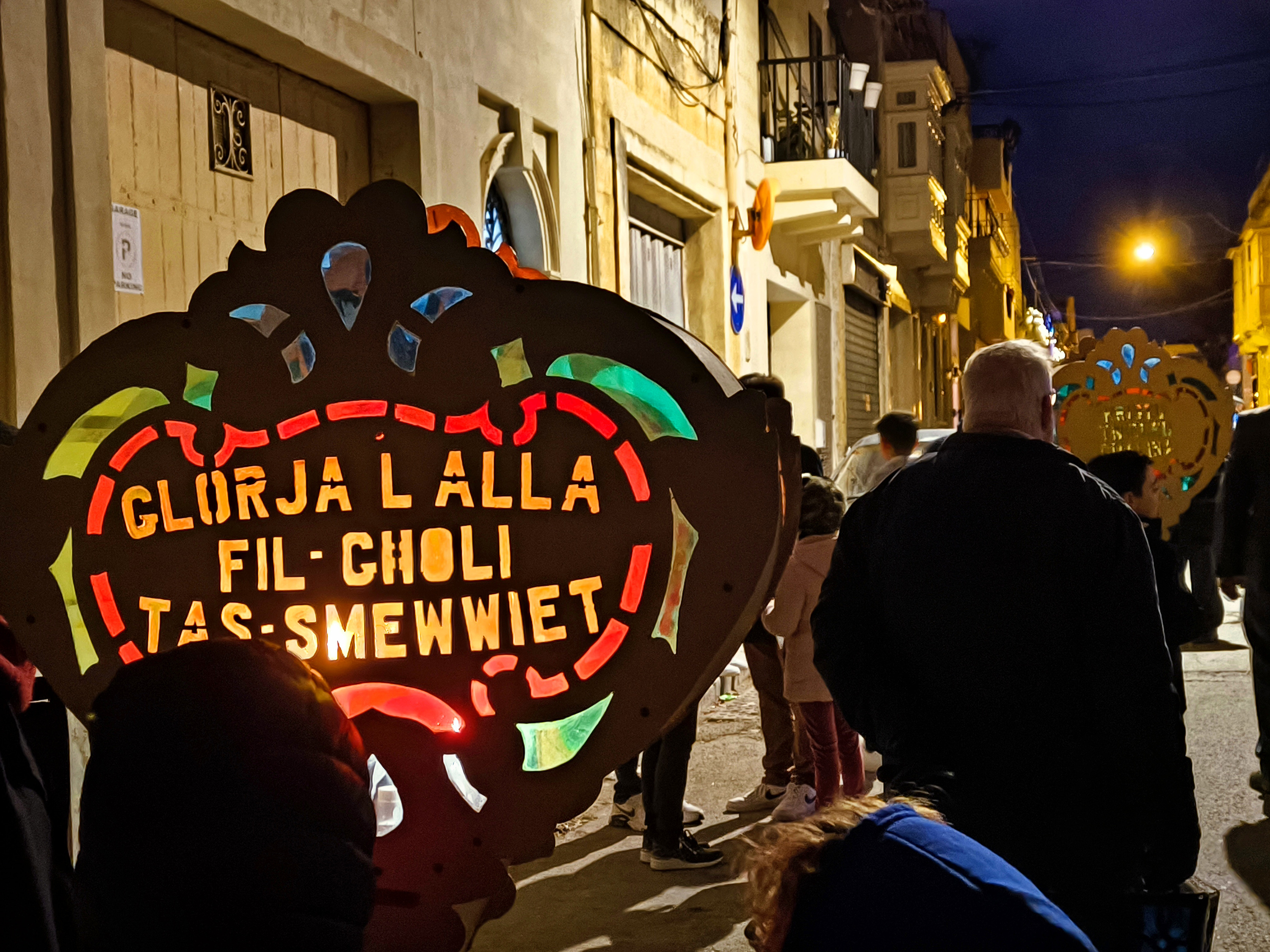
Christmas Eve procession in Tarxien

A procession on Christmas Eve is a common part of Christmas celebrations in Malta. The tradition originates in a procession led by Saint George Preca (Maltese: Dun Ġorġ) in Hamrun in 1921, and spread across the island over the next two decades. In order to curtail mishaps of crowd impacting, spectators are encouraged to watch the procession from windows and balconies.

The procession of the Baby Jesus was not held by the Archdiocese of Malta for two years during the COVID-19 pandemic, but resumed in 2022. Children dress up as figures from the Bible, accompanied by the singing of Christmas carols.
