= Charles Scicluna =

Canadian-Maltese prelate

His Grace, The Most Reverend Charles J. Scicluna
- Archbishop of Malta; Adjunct Secretary of the Congregation for the Doctrine of the Faith
- Charles Jude Scicluna in 2016
- Church: Roman Catholic Church
- Archdiocese: Malta
- See: Malta
- Appointed: 27 February 2015
- Installed: 21 March 2015
- Predecessor: Paul Cremona
- Other post: Adjunct Secretary of the Congregation for the Doctrine of the Faith (2018-)
- Previous posts: Promoter of Justice, Congregation for the Doctrine of the Faith; Auxiliary Bishop of Malta (2012–2015)

Orders
- Ordination: 11 July 1986 by Joseph Mercieca
- Consecration: 24 November 2012 by Paul Cremona
- Rank: Metropolitan Archbishop

Personal details
- Born: 15 May 1959 (age 67) Toronto, Ontario, Canada
- Denomination: Roman Catholic
- Parents: Emanuel Scicluna; Maria Carmela Falzon
- Education: Pontifical Gregorian University
- Motto: Fidelis et Verax (Faithful and True)
- Coat of arms

Charles Jude Scicluna (born 15 May 1959) is a Canadian-Maltese prelate of the Catholic Church who has served as Archbishop of Malta since 2015. Both as a curial official and since becoming a bishop, he has conducted investigations into sexual abuse by clergy on behalf of the Holy See and led a board that reviews such cases. He has been called "the Vatican's most respected sex crimes expert".

He held positions in the Roman Curia from 1995 to 2012, when he was appointed Auxiliary Bishop of Malta. Since November 2018, Scicluna has been an Adjunct Secretary of the Dicastery for the Doctrine of the Faith.

== Education and priesthood ==
Scicluna was born to Maltese parents in Toronto, Ontario, Canada, on 15 May 1959. His family moved to Qormi in Malta when he was 11 months old. In Malta, he attended St. Edward's College. After secondary school, he studied at the Major Seminary there. He went to the University of Malta in 1976 and obtained a Doctor of Laws (LLD) degree in civil law there in 1984. After completing his seminary studies and earning a Licentiate of Sacred Theology (STL) in pastoral theology at the Faculty of Theology in the Seminary at Tal-Virtù, he was ordained a priest for the Archdiocese of Malta by Archbishop Joseph Mercieca on 11 July 1986. In 1991 he also obtained a Doctorate of Canon Law (JCD) at the Pontifical Gregorian University in Rome. (Note: His thesis was published in 1995 as The essential definition of marriage according to the 1917 and 1983 codes of canon law: an exegetical and comparative study.) His thesis supervisor was Fr. Raymond Leo Burke and he presented it to Professor Fr. Urbano Navarrete Cortés, SJ; both later became cardinals. Scicluna later said: "They wanted me to stay in Rome, in the Apostolic Signatura, but the archbishop called me back to Malta."

Between 1990 and 1995, he was Defender of the Bond and Promoter of Justice at the Metropolitan Court of Malta, Professor of Pastoral Theology and Canon Law at the Faculty of Theology and Vice-Rector of the Major Seminary of the Archdiocese. His pastoral activities included service at the parishes of St. Gregory the Great in Sliema and Transfiguration in Iklin. He served as chaplain to the local Convent of St. Catherine.

== Curial service ==
In 1995 he began his 17-year Holy See career, first as Deputy Promoter of Justice at the Supreme Tribunal of the Apostolic Signatura and then beginning in 2002 as Promoter of Justice in the Congregation for the Doctrine of the Faith (CDF) under Joseph Cardinal Ratzinger. He also taught as Invited Professor at the Faculty of Law at the Pontifical Gregorian University. Between 1996 and 2007, he promoted the cause of the canonization of Saint George Preca.

As Promoter of Justice, he was credited with constructing the 2010 universal norms that extended the Church's statutes of limitations on reporting cases of sexual abuse and expanded the category of ecclesial crimes to include sexual misconduct with a disabled adult and possession of child pornography. He provided a brief history of the activities of the CDF with respect to abuse cases in a June 2010 interview.

In 2005, Ratzinger tasked Scicluna with collecting testimony about the founder of the Legionaries of Christ, Rev. Marcial Maciel, amid allegations of abuse.

At a prayer service for priests in St Peter's Basilica in May 2010, Scicluna addressed the clerical vocation and said:

The child becomes the model for the disciple who wants to be "great" in the kingdom of heaven.... How many are the sins in the church for arrogance, for insatiable ambition, the tyranny and injustice of those who take advantage of ministry to advance their careers, to show off, for reasons of futile and miserable reasons of vanity! ... Accepting the kingdom of God like a child is to accept with a pure heart, with docility, abandonment, confidence, enthusiasm, and hope. All this reminds us of the child. All this makes the child precious in God's eyes, and in the eyes of a true disciple of Jesus.

He went on to quote the gospels on the corruption of the young–"Whoever causes one of these little ones who believe in me to sin, it would be better for him if a great millstone were hung around his neck and he were thrown into the sea" (Mark 9:42)–and then quoted Gregory the Great's exegesis of that verse's meaning for priests:

Mystically expressed in the millstone is the hard and tedious rhythm of secular life, while the deep sea signifies the most terrible curse. Thus, after having taken a profession of holiness, anyone who destroys others through words or deed would have been better off if their misdeeds had caused them to die in secular dress, rather than, through their holy office, being imposed as an example for others in their sins. Without a doubt, if they had fallen all by themselves, their suffering in Hell would be easier to bear.

Addressing a conference on sexual abuse held in February 2012 at the Pontifical Gregorian University, he explained that the CDF needed the support of the entire church hierarchy for its procedures to have their intended impact: "No strategy for the prevention of child abuse will ever work without commitment and accountability." He said that "the deliberate denial of known facts, and the misplaced concern that the good name of the institution should somehow enjoy absolute priority" were "enemies of truth" and reflected "a deadly culture of silence" which he characterized as a form of omertà, the word used to describe the Mafia's code of silence to protect criminal conspiracies in the face of civil and criminal authority. He described the pastoral needs of those abused, "the radical need of the victim to be heard attentively, to be understood and believed, to be treated with dignity as he or she plods on the tiresome journey of recovery and healing", and highlighted the special care needed by those who find themselves unable to recover, "who seem to have identified 'self' simply with 'having been victims'". He told reporters that bishops needed to adhere to church law and CDF's standards: "It is a crime in canon law to show malicious or fraudulent negligence in the exercise of one's duty. I'm not saying that we should start punishing everybody for any negligence in his duties. But what I want to say is that this is not acceptable. It is not acceptable that when there are set standards, people do not follow the set standards."

Styles of Charles Scicluna
- Reference style: The Most Reverend; His Excellency; His Grace
- Spoken style: Your Excellency; Your Grace
- Religious style: Archbishop

== Auxiliary Bishop ==
On 6 October 2012, Pope Benedict XVI named Scicluna Auxiliary Bishop of the Archdiocese of Malta and Titular Bishop of San Leone. The Holy See announcement described him as "highly respected among his peers around the world for his lecturing skills and his expertise in child protection issues". In an interview on the eve of his departure from Rome, Scicluna said the move was a promotion and not a manifestation of departmental rivalries within the Holy See. He said it did not indicate any alteration in policy with respect to the handling of sex abuse cases, which would continue to maintain the aggressive stance he had adopted: "This is policy. It's not Scicluna. It's the pope. And this will remain." He said he would continue to address the issue as bishop: "If you want to silence someone, you don't make him a bishop."

He was consecrated bishop on 24 November 2012 by Archbishop Paul Cremona, at St. John's Co-Cathedral. The co-consecrators were Archbishop Emeritus Joseph Mercieca and Bishop Mario Grech of Gozo. In his Christmas sermon the next year, Scicluna discussed the need for "strong families", later telling an interviewer that when had told the pope he was worried about the legalization of same-sex marriage and adoption by same-sex couples in Malta the pope encouraged him to speak out.

== Appointments ==
On 1 December 2012 Pope Benedict XVI appointed Scicluna to a renewable five-year term as a member of the Congregation for the Doctrine of the Faith. (Note: This appointment lapsed with the end of Benedict's papacy and it was later confirmed by Pope Francis.)

In April 2014 Scicluna was appointed by the Holy See to take the testimony of clergy alleging sexual misconduct in the Archdiocese of St Andrews and Edinburgh.

In January 2015 he was appointed to preside over the new doctrinal team dealing with appeals filed by clergy accused of abuse within the Congregation for the Doctrine of the Faith (CDF). (Note: Pope Francis had established the new board of review on 3 November 2014 to speed up the process of hearing and ruling on appeals filed by priests laicized or otherwise disciplined in sexual abuse or other serious cases. Members of the doctrinal congregation had been examining an average of four or five appeals, mostly in sex abuse cases, at each of their monthly meetings; the substantial number of appeals and the need to examine them more promptly led to the creation of the board to judge cases involving priests.) On 13 November 2018 Francis gave him in addition the post of Adjunct Secretary of the CDF.

== Archbishop of Malta ==
Upon the resignation of Archbishop Paul Cremona, Scicluna was appointed Apostolic Administrator of the archdiocese on 18 October 2014. On 27 February 2015 Pope Francis appointed Scicluna Metropolitan Archbishop of Malta. He was installed on 21 March 2015 in St Paul's Cathedral in Mdina.

Since his installation, he has been president of the Maltese Episcopal Conference.

On 30 January 2018, after Pope Francis was sharply criticized for controversial comments about the clergy sex abuse scandal in Chile, he sent Scicluna to conduct an investigation and take statements from victims who charged that Msg. Juan Barros, whom Francis named Bishop of Osorno in 2015, had personal knowledge of their abuse years earlier. On 8 April, in a letter to the bishops of Chile, Francis said that Scicluna's 2,300-page report prompted him to apologize for misrepresenting the evidence of clerical sexual abuse in Chile and to summon the bishops of Chile to Rome for consultation in May. On 11 June 2018 Francis accepted the resignation of Barros, along with the resignation of two other bishops in Chile.

Scicluna is the Grand Prior of the Malta Lieutenancy of the Equestrian Order of the Holy Sepulchre of Jerusalem.

== Views ==
=== Sexuality ===
During the Meeting on the Protection of Minors in the Church, Italian journalist Sandro Magister asked Scicluna why the term “homosexuality” was absent from the opening day presentations of the summit. Scicluna replied, “These are human conditions [heterosexuality and homosexuality] that we recognize, that exist. But they aren’t something that really predisposes to sin."

=== Clerical celibacy ===
In January 2024, Scicluna supported married priests in Roman Catholic church.

== Honours ==
- (Russian Empire) Russian Imperial Family: Knight Grand Cordon of the Imperial Order of Saint Stanislaus (21 June 2017)
- (Russian Empire) Russian Imperial Family: Recipient of the 400th Anniversary Medal of the House of Romanov
- Knight Commander with Star of the Equestrian Order of the Holy Sepulchre of Jerusalem.

== Notes ==
Preceded by Paul Cremona	Archbishop of Malta; 2015–present	Incumbent
