= Rawil Ğaynetdin =

Russian mufti (born 1959)

Ravil Gaynutdin
- Равиль Гайнутдин; Равил Гайнетдин
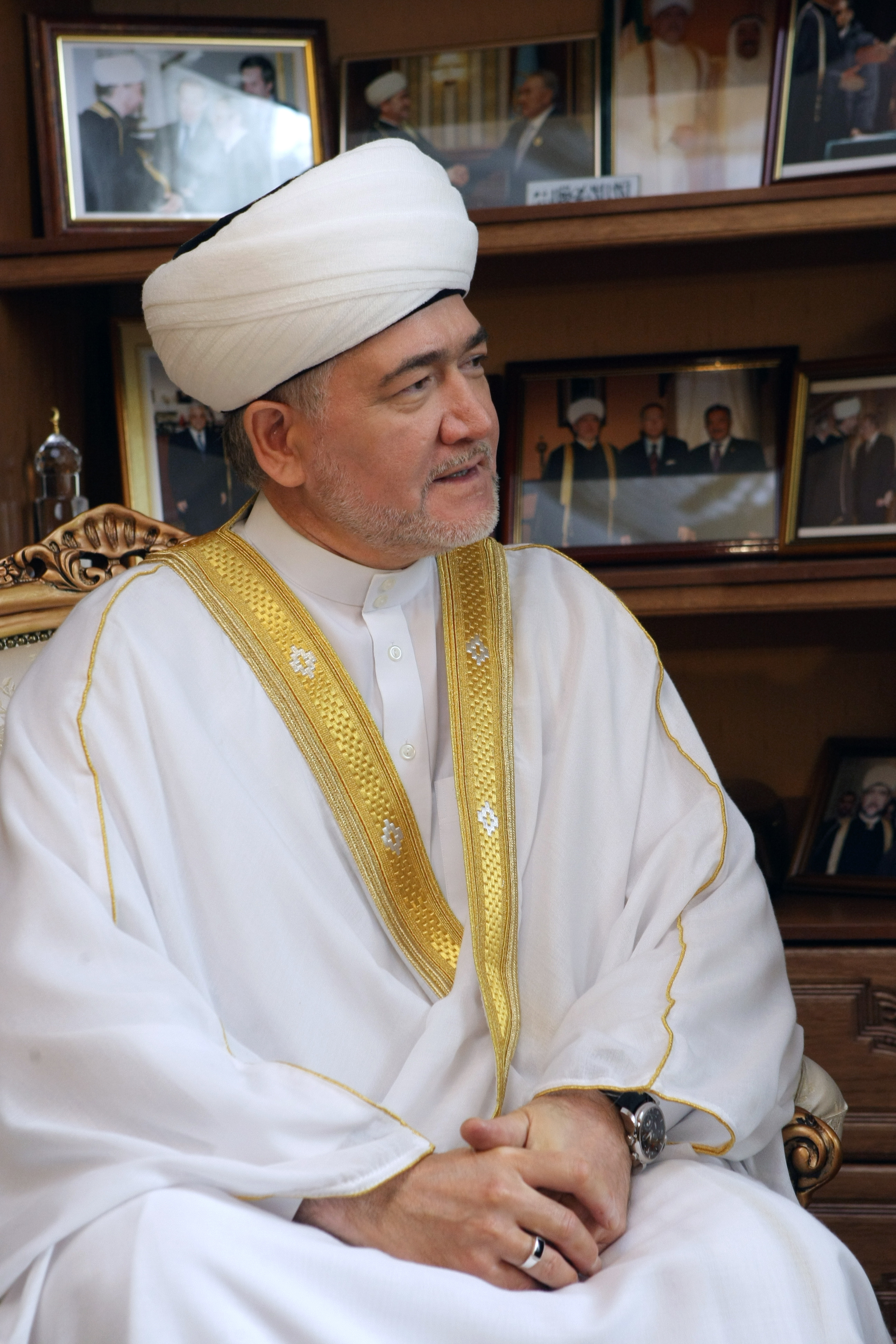
- Gaynutdin in 2010
- Title: Grand Mufti of Russia

Personal life
- Born: 25 August 1959 (age 67) Shali, Tatar ASSR, Russian SFSR, Soviet Union (Present-day Tatarstan, Russia)
- Spouse: Zukhra-Khanum Gainutdinova

Religious life
- Religion: Islam
- Denomination: Sunni
- Jurisprudence: Hanafi
- Movement: Islamic neo-traditionalism
- Profession: Scholar

Muslim leader
- Period in office: 1 July 1996 - Present

Ravil Gaynutdin (or Gainutdin; Russian: Рави́ль Исмаги́лович Гайнутди́нов, romanized: Ravil Ismagilovich Gaynutdinov, Tatar: Равил Исмәгыйл улы Гайнетдин, romanized: Rawil İsmäğil ulı Ğäynetdin) is a Moscow-based Mufti and scholar, an ethnic Volga Tatar born in the village of Shali of Pestrechinsky District of the Tatar ASSR, Soviet Union on August 25, 1959.

Gaynutdin has served as one of the Grand Muftis of Russia and the Chairman of the Russian Council of Muftis since July 1, 1996. He is one of the signatories of A Common Word Between Us and You, an open letter by Islamic scholars to Christian leaders, calling for peace and understanding. Gaynutdin has been called a key figure in relations between the Kremlin and Russia's Muslim population and one of the most important people in the Islamic World in Russia.

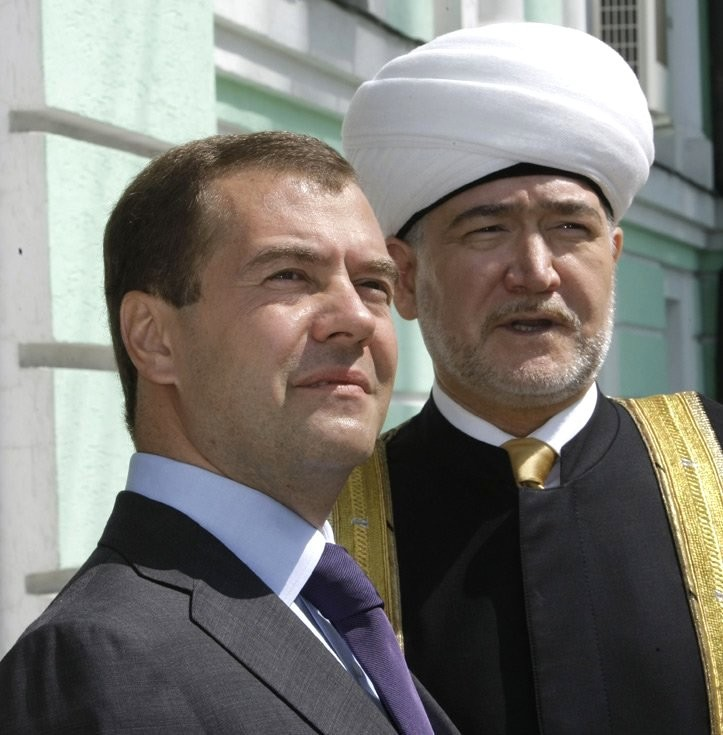
With Dmitry Medvedev, 15 July 2009

Gaynutdin has put forward ideas such as the following: "I agree with (Nikolay) Karamzin, the excellent Russian historian of the 19th century, who said that Moscow owes its greatness to the khans of the Golden Horde. However, this also applies to all of Russia, because thanks to the political will of the khans, the gathering of the scattered principalities around Moscow began".

== Honours and awards ==
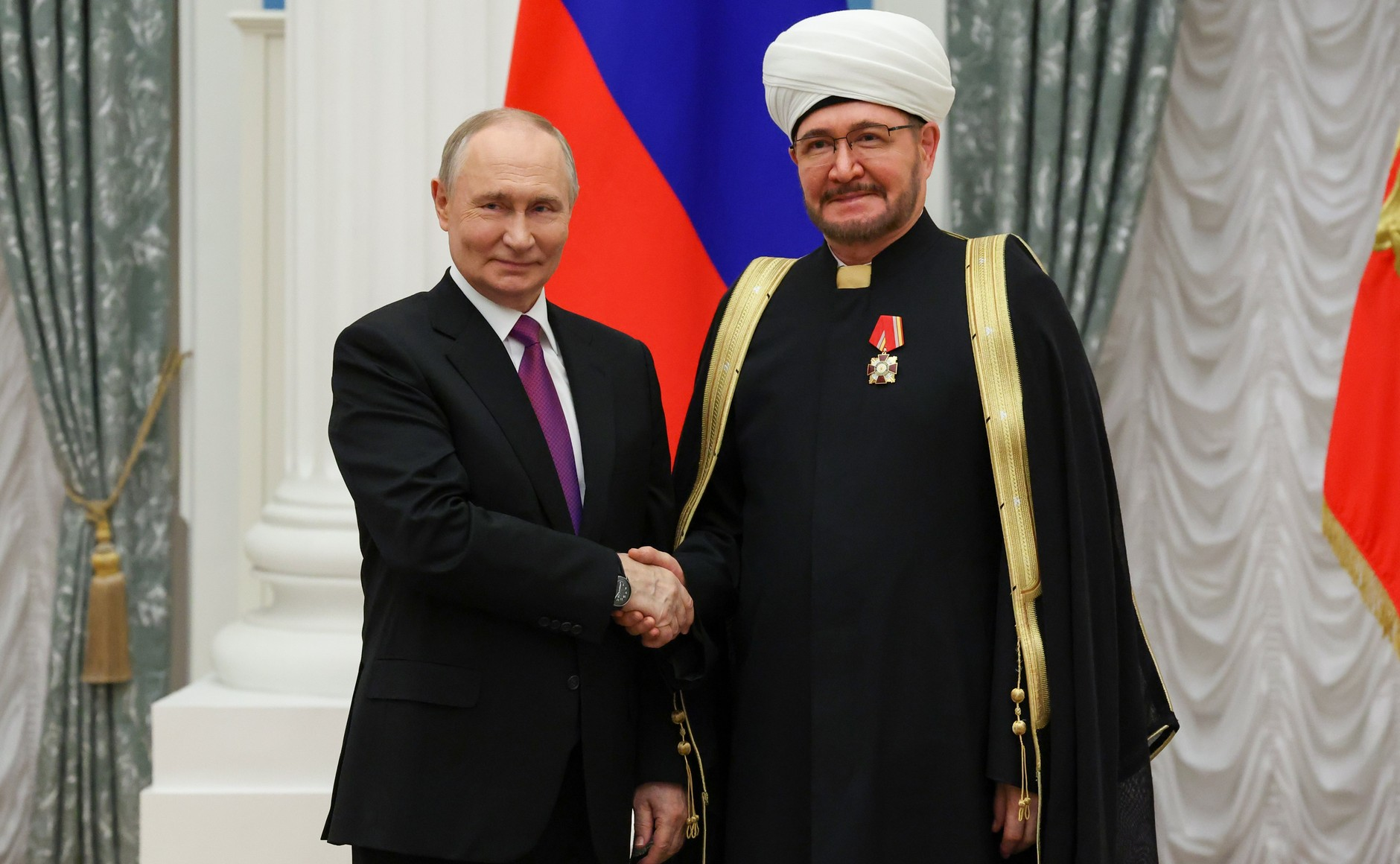
Presentation of the Order "For Valiant Labor", 4 November 2025

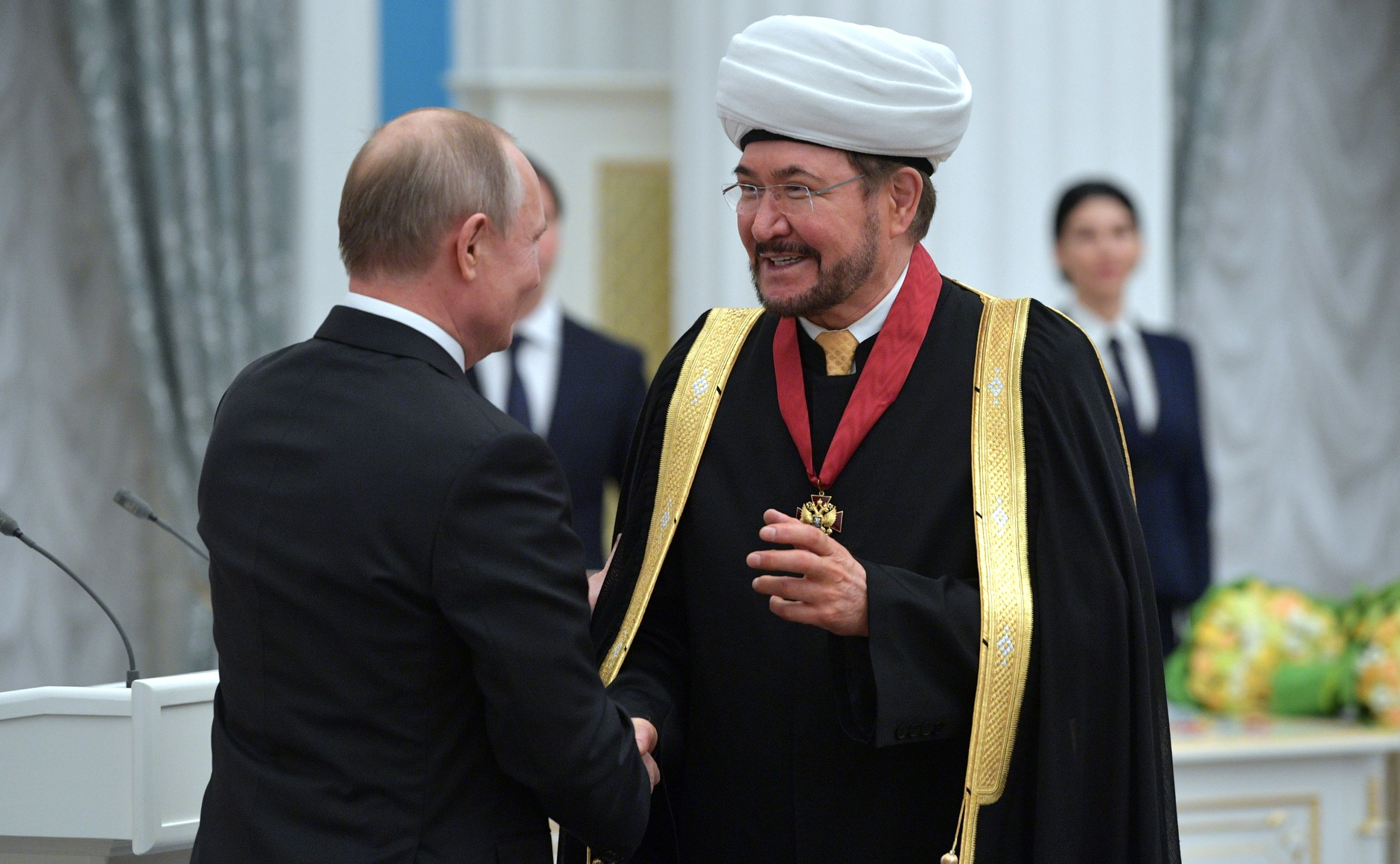
Presentation of the Order "For Merit to Fatherland", 21 November 2009

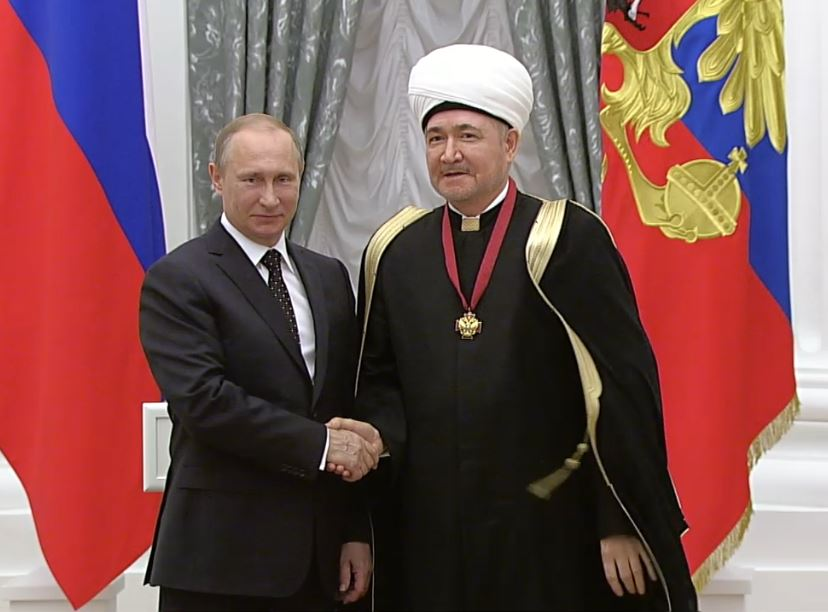
President Vladimir Putin and Ravil Gainutdin at the ceremony of presenting state awards and titles in the Kremlin on May 21, 2015.

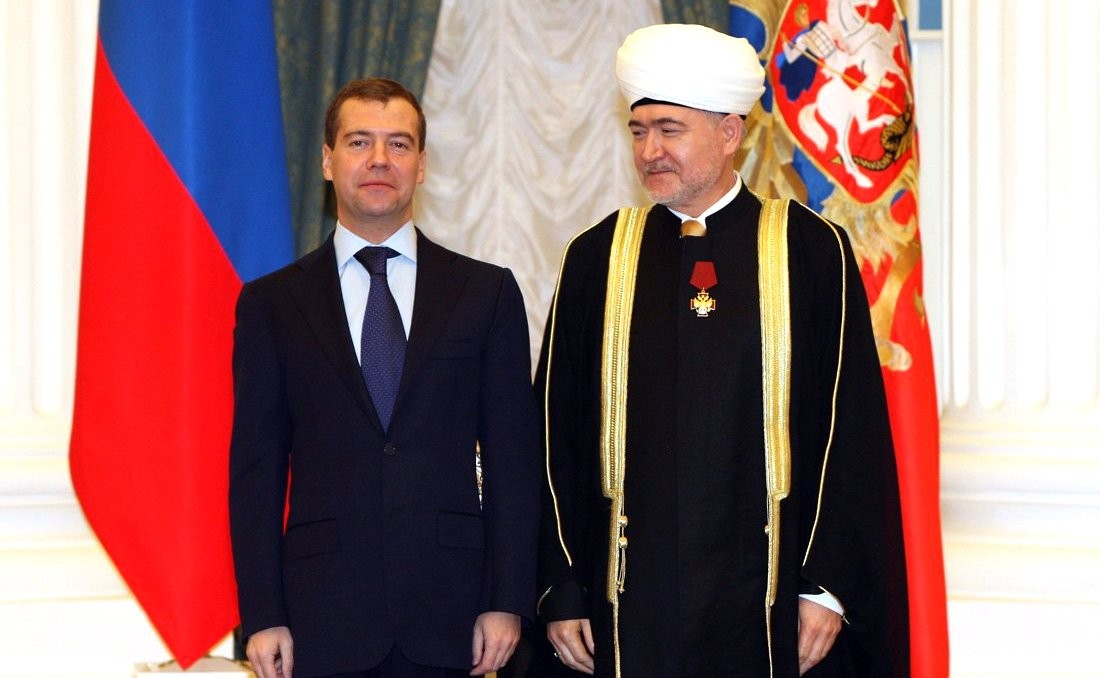
Dmitry Medvedev awarded of the Order "For Merit to the Fatherland", 2 November 2009

=== Honours ===
==== National honours ====
- Russia
  - (Russian Empire) Russian Imperial Family: Knight Grand Cordon of the Imperial Order of Saint Stanislaus, Special Class
  - (Russian Empire) Russian Imperial Family: Recipient of the 400th Anniversary Medal of the House of Romanov
  - Russia: Order of Merit to the Fatherland
    - Grand Officer - 9 September 2019 (Note: ”For his great contribution to strengthening interethnic and interfaith peace and harmony in society”.)
    - Commander - 23 March 2015
    - Member - 11 August 2009 (Note: ”For his great contribution to the development of spiritual culture and the strengthening of friendship between nations”.)
  - Russia: Member of the Decoration of Honour - 15 January 2004 (Note: ”For his great contribution to strengthening civil peace and interfaith cooperation”.)
  - Russia: Member of the Decoration of Friendship - 6 October 1997 (Note: ”For his great contribution to strengthening the economy, the development of the social sphere and in connection with the 850th anniversary of the founding of Moscow”.)

==== Foreign honours ====
- Kazakhstan: Recipient of the Commemorative Medal of "10 years of Astana"
- Kazakhstan: Recipient of the Commemorative Medal of 20 Years of Independence
- Palestine: Commander of the Order of the Star of Jerusalem - 2015

=== Awards ===
- Presidential Certificate of Honour - 23 August 1999 (Note: ”For his great contribution to the establishment of peace and harmony in society”.)
- Russian Orthodox Church: Recipient of the gold medal for Peace and Charity - 2011 (Note: ”For his active work on the spiritual revival of Russia and his great contribution to the development of peacekeeping and interfaith dialogue”.)
