= Preca =

Preca is a surname. Notable people with the surname include:

- George Preca (1880–1962), Maltese priest and Roman Catholic saint
- Marie-Louise Coleiro Preca (born 1958), Maltese politician and President of Malta
