= Joseph Cassar =

Joseph Cassar is the name of:

- Joseph Cassar (diplomat) (1947–2018), Maltese diplomat
- Joseph Cassar (politician) (1918–2001), Maltese politician
- Joe Cassar (born 1966), Maltese politician
