= Martin Crane (bishop) =

Catholic bishop in Australia (1818–1901)

The Most Reverend Martin Crane DD
- 1st Bishop
- Diocese: Sandhurst
- Installed: 4 August 1874
- Term ended: 21 October 1901
- Predecessor: New diocese
- Successor: Stephen Reville, OSA

Orders
- Ordination: 12 August 1841 (Priest) at Perugia, Italy
- Consecration: 21 September 1874 (Bishop) in St Mary's Pro-Cathedral, Dublin

Personal details
- Born: 11 October 1818 Bannow, County Wexford, Ireland
- Died: 21 October 1901 (aged 83) Victoria, Australia
- Denomination: Roman Catholic
- Occupation: Roman Catholic bishop
- Profession: Cleric

Martin Crane OSA, DD (11 October 1818 – 21 October 1901), an Irish-born Australian suffragan bishop, was the first Roman Catholic Bishop of the Diocese of Sandhurst, serving between 1874 until his death in office in 1901.

== Biography ==
Crane was born in Bannow, County Wexford, Ireland, the son of James Crane, a farmer and his wife, Mary. Together, they had five sons, who all became priests and a sister who became a Carmelite nun.

Crane received his early education at Wexford and joined the Augustinian order at Grantstown and completed his ministerial studies in Rome. Crane was ordained a priest at Perugia, Italy on 12 April 1841 at age 22. He later returned to Ireland.

He was consecrated bishop in St Mary's Pro-Cathedral, Dublin on 21 September 1874. He left for Australia the next year and was installed on 16 May 1875. He greatly expanded the Diocese of Sandhurst in Victoria, increasing the number of resident priests and building new schools and churches.

Bishop Crane died on 21 October 1901, aged 83 in Victoria.

Since Crane's death, Shepparton's Notre Dame College have named one of their six houses in his name.

Catholic Church titles
Preceded by New diocese	1st Catholic Bishop of Sandhurst; 1874 – 1901	Succeeded by Stephen Reville
