= Annetto Depasquale =

Maltese bishop (1938–2011)

His Excellency Annetto Depasquale
- Auxiliary Bishop of Malta
- Church: Roman Catholic
- Archdiocese: Malta
- Appointed: 16 November 1998
- In office: 1998-2011
- Other post: Titular Bishop of Aradi

Orders
- Ordination: 7 Apr 1962 by Mikiel Gonzi
- Consecration: 2 January 1999 by Joseph Mercieca
- Rank: Bishop

Personal details
- Born: 28 June 1938 Qormi, Malta
- Died: 29 November 2011 (aged 73) Malta

Annetto Depasquale (28 July 1938 – 29 November 2011) was the Roman Catholic titular bishop of Aradi and the auxiliary bishop of the Roman Catholic Archdiocese of Malta, Malta.

== Biography ==
Depasquale was born in Qormi on 28 June 1938 and was ordained a priest on 7 April 1962.

He served in the Commission for Children's Homes and the Pastoral Research Services, as well as the parish of St. George in Qormi and later the parish of English-speaking Catholics. He was appointed Chancellor of the Curia in 1977 and became Pastoral Secretary in April 1986.

On 16 November 1989, he was appointed Vicar General, serving as the deputy to Archbishop Joseph Mercieca. Depasquale's episcopal consecration took place on 2 January 1999. He was once considered a possible successor to Mercieca. Still, his health declined, and he could not fully carry out his duties for several months. Although he eventually returned to duty, he never fully recovered.

Depasquale died on 29 November 2011.
