= Shali, Republic of Tatarstan =

Rural locality in Tatarstan, Russia

Coordinates: 55°40′57″N 49°39′35″E

Shali or Şäle (Russian: Шали́; Tatar: Шәле, pronounced [ʃæˈle]) is a village (selo) in Pestrechinsky District of the Republic of Tatarstan, Russia, situated 10 kilometers (6.2 mi) south of Pestretsy, the administrative center of the district.

The village is situated on the M7 highway. Shali's population was 3,131 in 1989, 2,980 in 2000; mostly ethnic Volga Tatars (as on 1989). The main occupation of the residents is agriculture and cattle breeding. There is a secondary school, a cultural centre, a clinic, and a mosque, dating back to the end of the 19th century. The population mostly adheres to Sunni Islam.

It was founded in the Khanate of Kazan epoch.

Russia's Grand Mufti Rawil Gaynetdin was born here in 1959.
