= Society of Christian Doctrine =

Society of Christian Doctrine (MUSEUM)
- Tal-Mużew

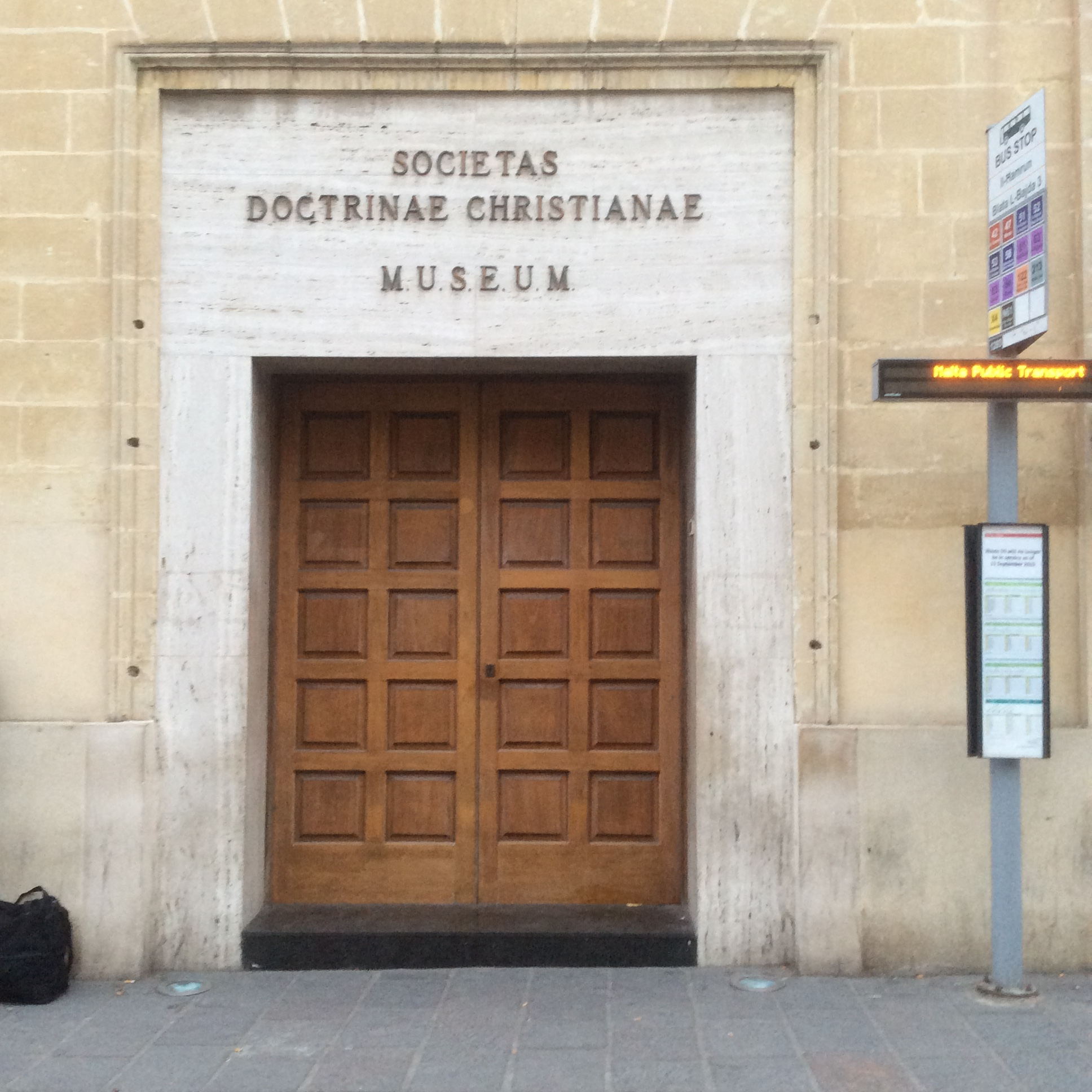
- Entrance to the mother-house of the society
- Abbreviation: MUSEUM
- Formation: March 1907
- Founder: George Preca
- Founded at: Ħamrun
- Type: Religious
- Legal status: Active
- Purpose: Teaching about the Roman Catholic religion
- Headquarters: Mother House, Societas Doctrinæ Christianæ, id-Dar Ġenerali
- Location: Blata l-Bajda, 207, Saint George Preca Road, Marsa MRS 9010
- Services: Doctrine
- Fields: Theology
- Official language: Maltese, English, Italian, Latin, Spanish and Albanian
- Director General: Roberto Zammit
- Affiliations: Roman Catholic Church in Malta
- Website: sdcmuseum.org (Malta) precacommunity.org (Australia)
- Remarks: Verbum Dei Caro Factum Est (The Word of God Became Flesh)
- Formerly called: Societas Papidum et Papidissarum (Society of the Sons and Daughters of the Pope)

The Society of Christian Doctrine (Latin: Societas Doctrinæ Christianæ, Italian: Società della Dottrina Cristiana, Maltese: Soċjetà Duttrina Nisranija; abbreviated SDC), better known as MUSEUM, is a society of Catholic lay volunteers, made of men and women, teaching catechism in the Christian faith formation of children and adults. The society was established by George Preca in March 1907, in Malta. It has eventually spread around the world, first among Maltese migrants in Australia, then in Albania, in North Sudan, and other countries.

== Name ==
MUSEUM is the abbreviation for "Magister Utinam Sequatur Evangelium Universus Mundus" as meaning "Master, may the whole world follow the Gospel."

== Centres ==
In Malta, the society has forty-six catechism centres for males and forty-three for females.

By 1961, the society spread in Gozo, and became successful after a visit for a fishing session. That same year catechism started for males, and in 1962 it was followed by the female branch. There are now nine catechism centres for males and seven for females in Gozo.

The objectives of the religious society is catechetical work in the parishes. Members may participate in the activities in six days every week. The society often organises recreational activities for minors and educational courses for adults.

Members of the society are invited to participate for a meeting every Wednesday at the mother-house of the society, in Blata l-Bajda, Marsa. The mother-house is the prominent Church of Our Lady of the Miraculous Medal. The main scope for teaching catechism is to religiously prepare individuals, generally minors, to receive the sacraments according to the Roman Catholic tradition.

== Superiors General ==
This is a list of former and present superiors general of the society:

- Eugenio Borg (1911–1967);
- Francesco Saliba (1967–1983);
- Victor Delicata (1983–2009);
- Natalino Camilleri (2009–2021) and
- Roberto Zammit (2021–present)

== See also ==
- Żgħażagħ Azzjoni Kattolika
- Religion in Malta
