= Les Tomlinson =

Australian Catholic bishop (born 1943)

The Most Reverend Les Tomlinson
- Bishop emeritus of Sandhurst
- Diocese: Sandhurst
- Installed: 1 March 2012
- Term ended: 23 July 2019
- Predecessor: Joseph Grech
- Successor: Shane Mackinlay

Orders
- Ordination: 18 August 1972 in St Joseph's Church, Red Cliffs
- Consecration: 17 June 2009 in St Patrick's Cathedral, Melbourne

Personal details
- Born: Leslie Rogers Tomlinson; 27 August 1943 (age 83) Mildura, Victoria, Australia
- Denomination: Roman Catholic Church
- Parents: Edward Tomlinson and Alice Tomlinson (née Rogers)
- Occupation: Roman Catholic bishop
- Profession: Cleric
- Education: St Paul’s National Seminary, Sydney
- Motto: Latin: In nomine Christi; In Christ's name

Leslie Rogers Tomlinson (born 27 August 1943) is an Australian retired Catholic bishop. On 3 February 2012, it was announced that Pope Benedict XVI had appointed Tomlinson as the seventh Bishop of Sandhurst. He was installed on 1 March 2012. He was formerly an auxiliary bishop and Vicar General in the Archdiocese of Melbourne.

== Early career and background ==
Tomlinson was born in Mildura, Victoria. He was educated at Sacred Heart School and St Joseph's College, Mildura. He undertook clerical work in Irymple and Melbourne prior to commencing studies for the priesthood at Corpus Christi College Werribee in 1968. At the invitation of Archbishop James Knox, he became one of the initial class of St Paul's National Seminary, in Kensington, Sydney. Tomlinson was ordained to the priesthood for the Archdiocese of Melbourne at St Joseph's Church, Red Cliffs on 18 August 1972. Following ordination he was assistant priest at Mitcham for three years before being loaned to the Archdiocese of Hobart for three years. Returning to Melbourne he served as assistant priest in North Dandenong and Sunshine before being appointed successively as parish priest of Carlton, Rowville and Ormond.

Tomlinson was dean of St Patrick's Cathedral for four months prior to being appointed vicar-general and moderator of the curia in April 2003, an appointment he held until his appointment as Bishop of Sandhurst. Pope John Paul II named him as a Prelate of Honour on 27 May 2003. Tomlinson also held a range of administrative roles for the Archdiocese of Melbourne. He had been an active member of the St Patrick's Cathedral Works Committee (1994–1997), involved as committee member and then secretary of the Priests' Remuneration Fund (August 1992–January 2003). He spent some years as state chaplain to the Knights of the Southern Cross and as the spiritual advisor of the state council of the St Vincent de Paul Society, Victoria.

== Bishop ==
On 5 May 2009, Tomlinson was appointed by Pope Benedict XVI as Titular Bishop of Sinitis and an auxiliary bishop of Melbourne and was consecrated at St Patrick's Cathedral, Melbourne, on 17 June 2009. On 15 October 2011, Tomlinson and eight other Australian bishops had an Ad Limina Apostolorum with Pope Benedict XVI and on 3 February 2012, Benedict XVI appointed Tomlinson as Bishop of Sandhurst and he was installed in this position on 1 March 2012. In 2019, Tomlinson was succeeded as Bishop by Shane MacKinlay.

Catholic Church titles
Preceded by Joseph Grech	7th Bishop of Sandhurst; 2012–2019	Succeeded by Shane MacKinlay
