= St Paul's Cathedral, Mdina =

Metropolitan Cathedral of Saint Paul
- Il-Katidral Metropolitan ta' San Pawl
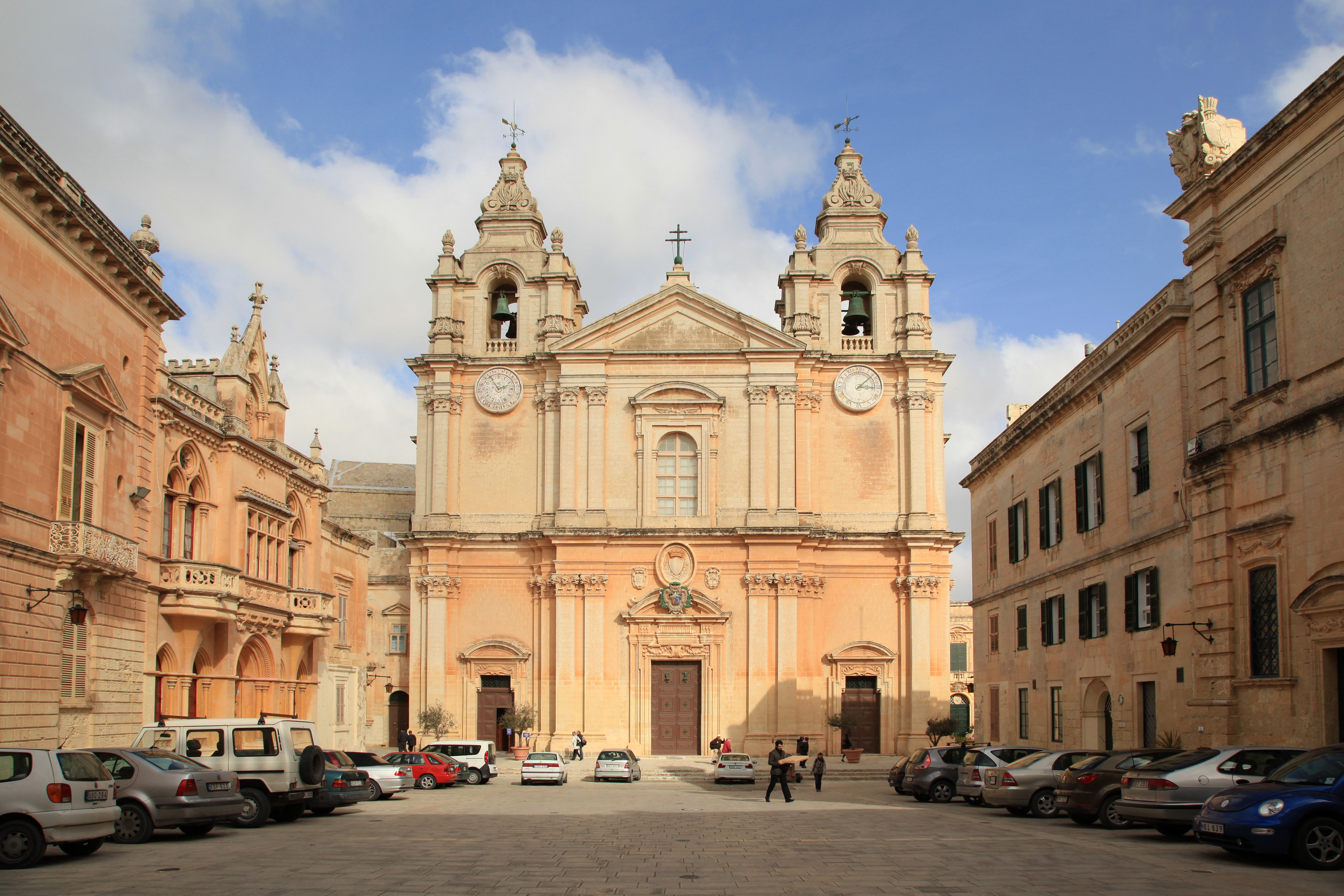
- Façade of St Paul's Cathedral in 2013
- Metropolitan Cathedral of Saint Paul
- 35°53′11″N 14°24′14″E
- Location: Mdina, Malta
- Denomination: Roman Catholic
- Website: metropolitanchapter.com

History
- Status: Cathedral
- Founded: 12th century
- Dedication: Paul the Apostle
- Consecrated: 8 October 1702

Architecture
- Functional status: Active
- Architect: Lorenzo Gafà
- Style: Baroque
- Years built: 1696–1705

Specifications
- Materials: Limestone

Administration
- Archdiocese: Archdiocese of Malta

Clergy
- Archbishop: Charles Scicluna

The Metropolitan Cathedral of Saint Paul (Maltese: Il-Katidral Metropolitan ta' San Pawl), commonly known as St Paul's Cathedral or the Mdina Cathedral, is a Catholic cathedral in Mdina, Malta, dedicated to St. Paul the Apostle. The cathedral was founded in the 12th century, and according to tradition it stands on the site where Roman governor Publius met St. Paul following his shipwreck on Malta. The original cathedral was severely damaged in the 1693 Sicily earthquake, so it was dismantled and rebuilt in the Baroque style to a design of the Maltese architect Lorenzo Gafà between 1696 and 1705. The cathedral is regarded as Gafà's masterpiece.

The cathedral is the seat of the Roman Catholic Archdiocese of Malta, and since the 19th century this function has been shared with St. John's Co-Cathedral in Valletta.

== History ==
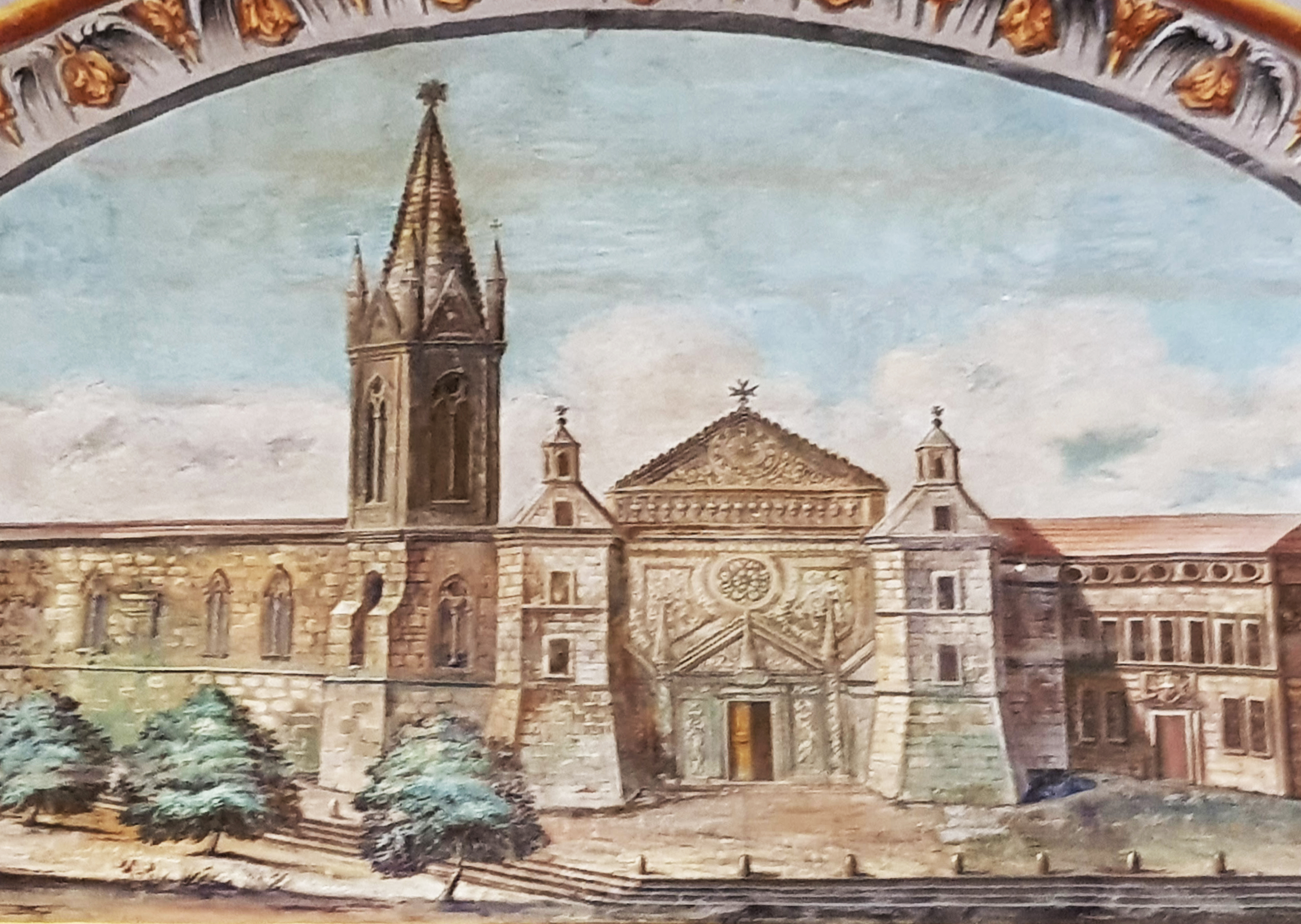
The old cathedral of Mdina, as depicted on a fresco at the Grandmaster's Palace in Valletta

According to tradition, the site of the Mdina cathedral was originally occupied by a palace belonging to Saint Publius, the Roman governor of Melite who greeted Paul the Apostle after he was shipwrecked in Malta. Though there are remains of a Roman domus in the present crypt, and the tradition is a commonly believed legend, the version of events is not supported by archaeologists or historians.

The first cathedral which stood on the site is said to have been dedicated to the Blessed Virgin Mary, but it fell into disrepair during the Arab period (the churches in Melite were looted after the Aghlabid invasion in 870). In Arab times, as revealed by excavations, the site was used as a mosque.

Following the Norman invasion in 1091, Christianity was re-established as the dominant religion in the Maltese islands. A cathedral dedicated to St. Paul was built in the 12th and 13th centuries. The cathedral was built in the Gothic and Romanesque styles, and it was enlarged and modified a number of times.

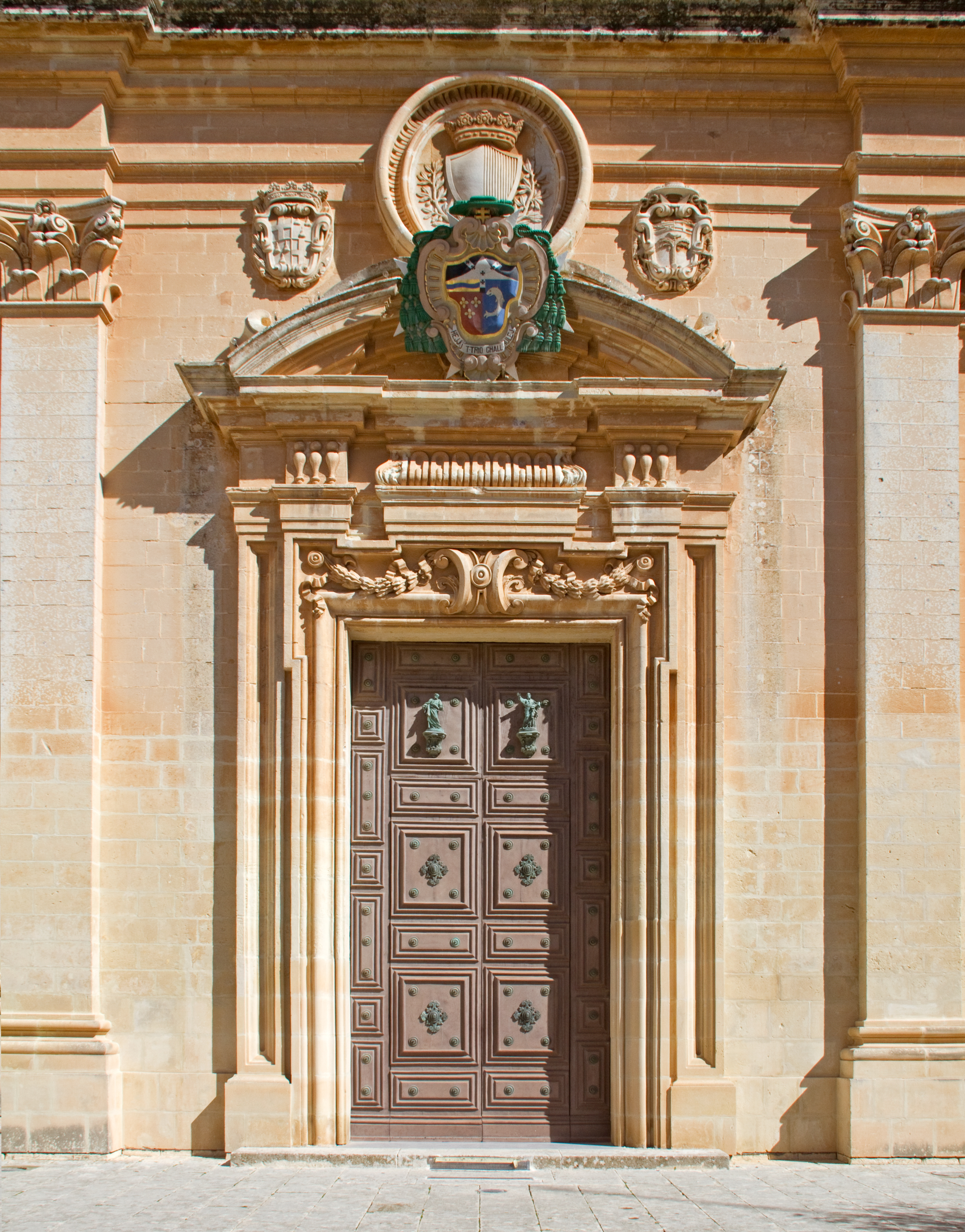
The cathedral's doorway

In 1679, Bishop Miguel Jerónimo de Molina and the cathedral chapter decided to replace the medieval choir with one built in the Baroque style, and the architect Lorenzo Gafà was appointed to design and oversee the construction. The cathedral was severely damaged a few years later in the 1693 Sicily earthquake, and although parts of the building were undamaged, on 11 April 1693 the decision was taken to dismantle the old cathedral and rebuild it in the Baroque style to a design of Gafà. The choir and sacristy, which had survived the earthquake, were incorporated into the new cathedral. Works began in 1696, and the building was almost complete by 1702. It was consecrated by Bishop Davide Cocco Palmieri on 8 October 1702. The cathedral was fully completed on 24 October 1705, when work on the dome was finished. The building is regarded as Gafà's masterpiece.

In the late 1720s, some medieval houses to the south of the cathedral were demolished in order to make way for a square, the Bishop's Palace and the Seminary (now the Cathedral Museum). The square in front of the cathedral was enlarged in the early 19th century following the demolition of some medieval buildings.

The cathedral was damaged in another earthquake in 1856, when the 18th-century frescoes on the dome were destroyed.

Today, the cathedral is one of the main tourist attractions of Mdina. It is a Grade 1 national monument, and it is also listed on the National Inventory of the Cultural Property of the Maltese Islands.

== Architecture ==
=== Exterior ===
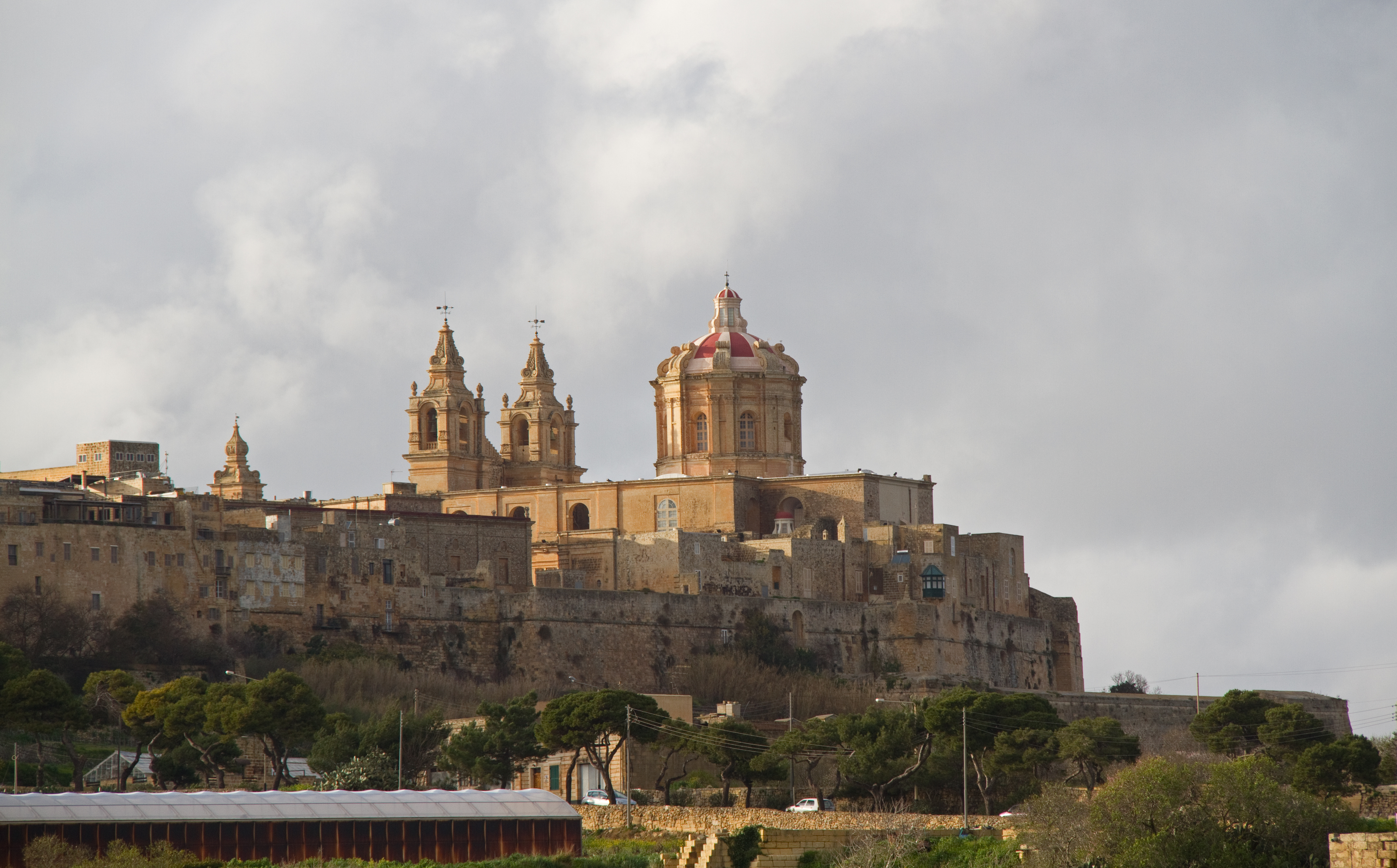
The cathedral's dome and belfries dominate the skyline of Mdina

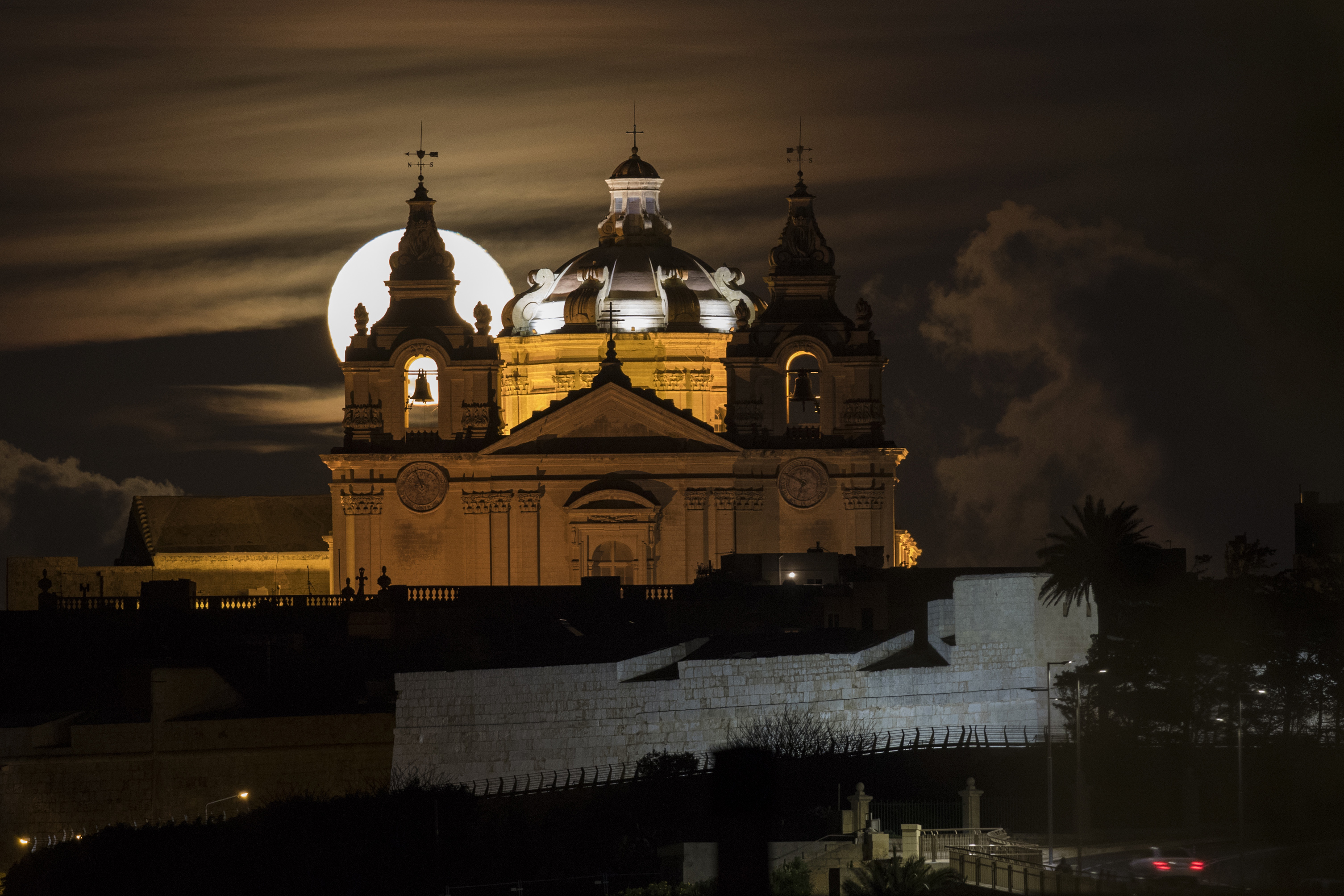
Dome and bastions

St. Paul's Cathedral is built in the Baroque style, with some influences from native Maltese architecture. The main façade is in St. Paul's Square (Maltese: Pjazza San Pawl or Misraħ San Pawl), and it is set on a low parvis approached by three steps. The façade is cleanly divided into three bays by pilasters of Corinthian and Composite orders. The central bay is set forward, and it contains the main doorway, which is surmounted by the coats of arms of the city of Mdina, Grand Master Ramon Perellos y Roccaful and Bishop Davide Cocco Palmieri, all of which were sculpted by Giuseppe Darmanin. The coloured coat of arms of the incumbent archbishop (presently Charles Scicluna) is located just below the arms of Mdina. A round-headed window is set in the upper story above the doorway, and the façade is topped by a triangular pediment. Bell towers originally containing six bells are located at both corners of the façade. It has an octagonal dome, with eight stone scrolls above a high drum leading up to a lantern.

=== Interior ===
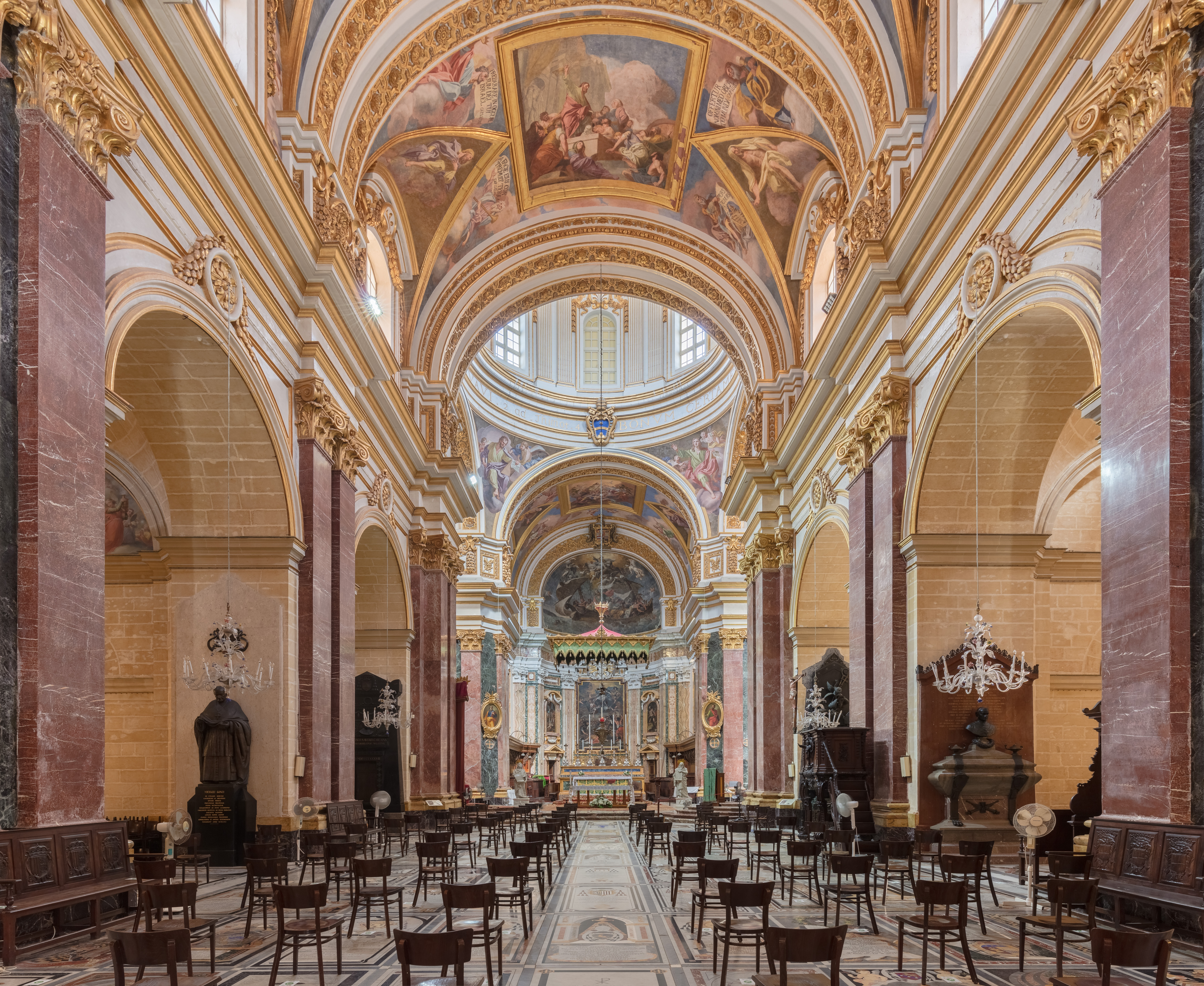
Main nave

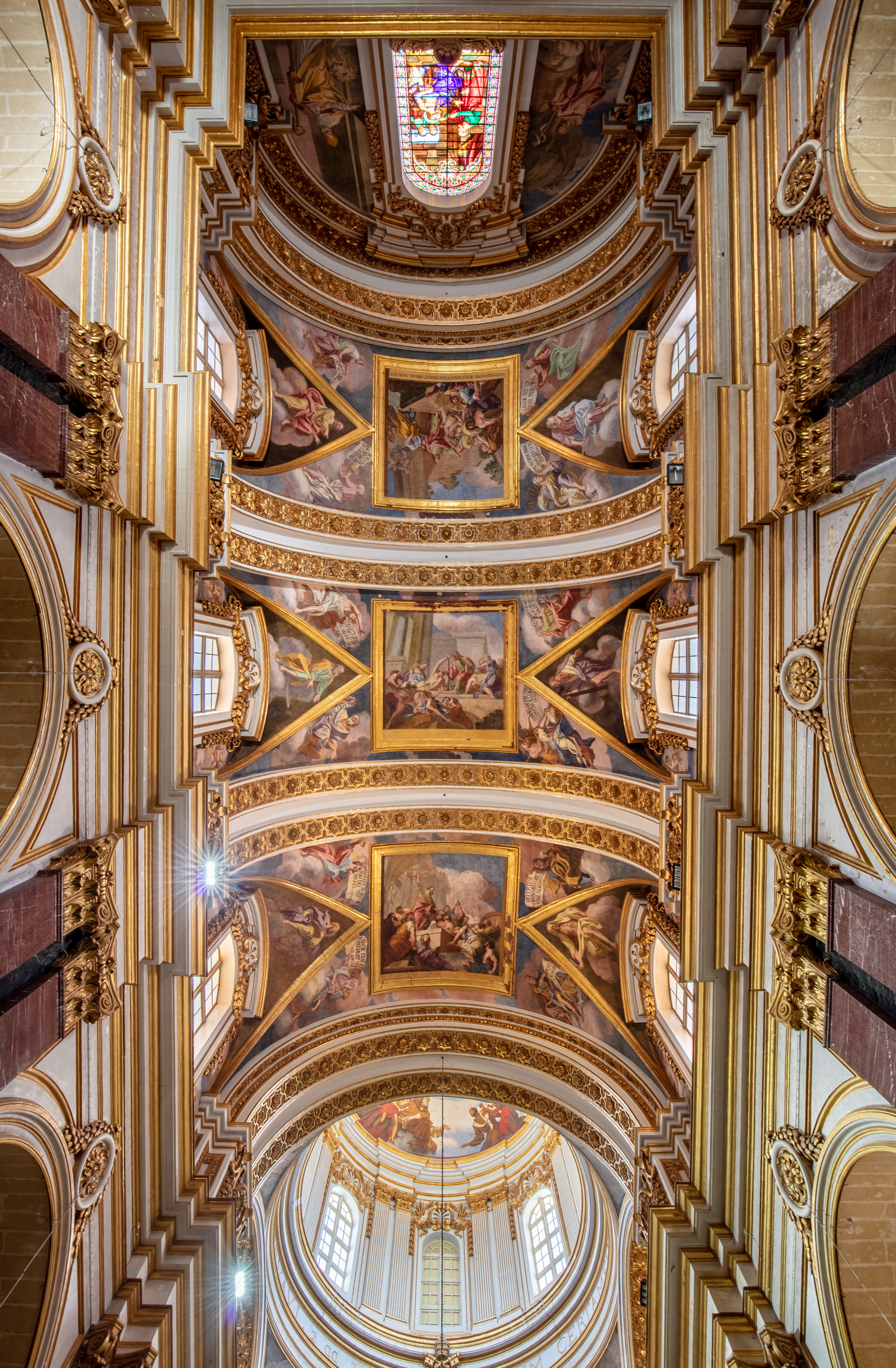
Ceiling

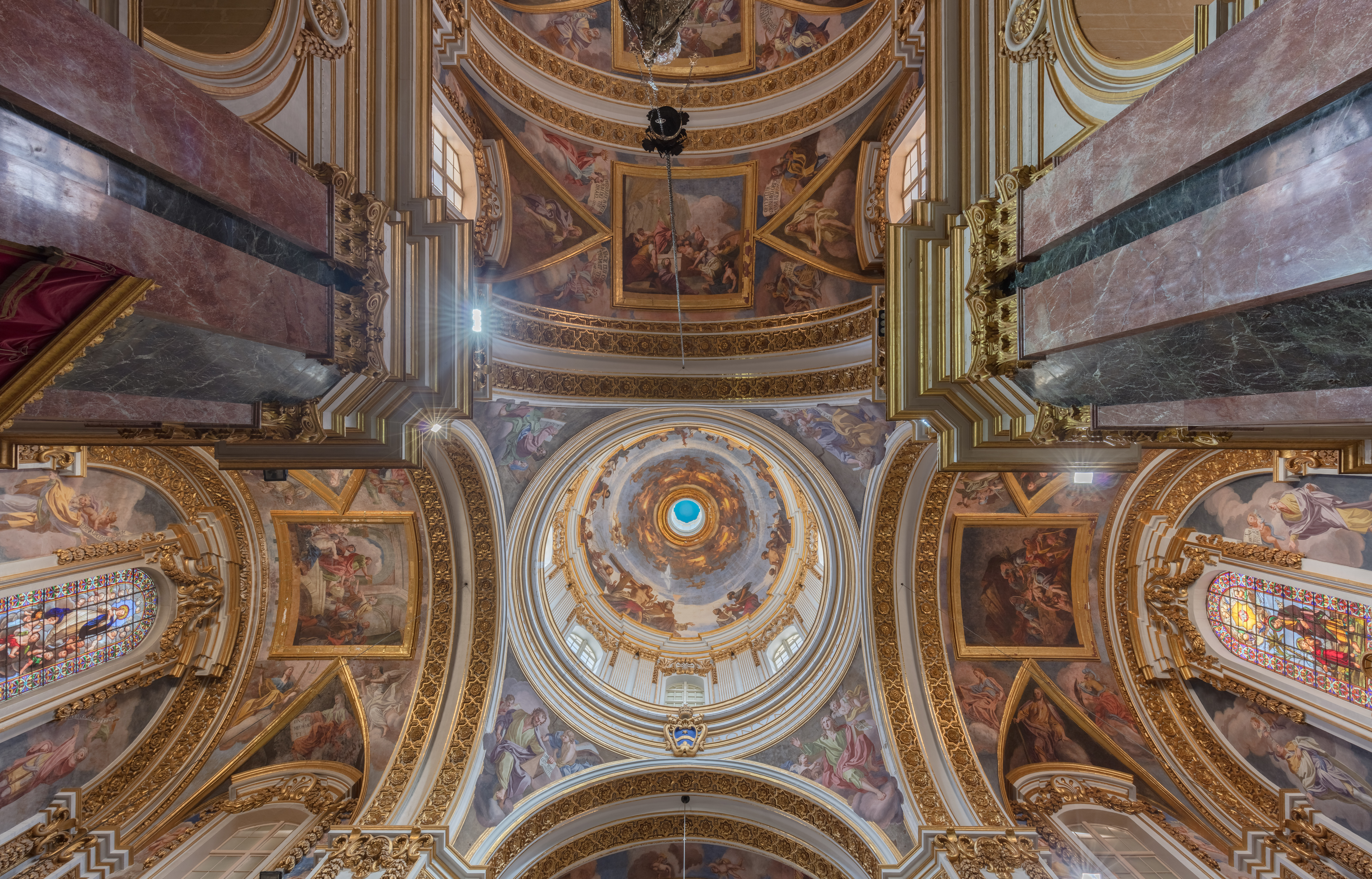
The cathedral's frescoed interior

The cathedral has a Latin cross plan consisting of a vaulted nave, two aisles and two side chapels. Most of the cathedral's floor consists of inlaid tombstones or commemorative marble slabs, similar to those found at St. John's Co-Cathedral in Valletta and the Cathedral of the Assumption in Victoria, Gozo. The remains of several bishops and canons, as well as laymen from noble families, are buried in the cathedral.

The ceiling contains frescoes depicting the life of St. Paul which were painted by the Sicilian painters Vincenzo, Antonio and Francesco Manno in 1794. The Manno brothers also painted frescoes on the dome, but these were destroyed during repair works after an earthquake in 1856. A new fresco was painted on the dome by Giuseppe Gallucci in 1860, and it was later restored by Giuseppe Calì. Gallucci's and Calì's paintings were destroyed due to urgent repair works in 1927, and they were later replaced by a fresco depicting The Glory of St Peter and St Paul by Mario Caffaro Rore. The ceiling was restored by Samuel Bugeja in 1956. The church is lit up by three stained glass windows which were produced in Victor Gesta's workshop in the late 19th century.

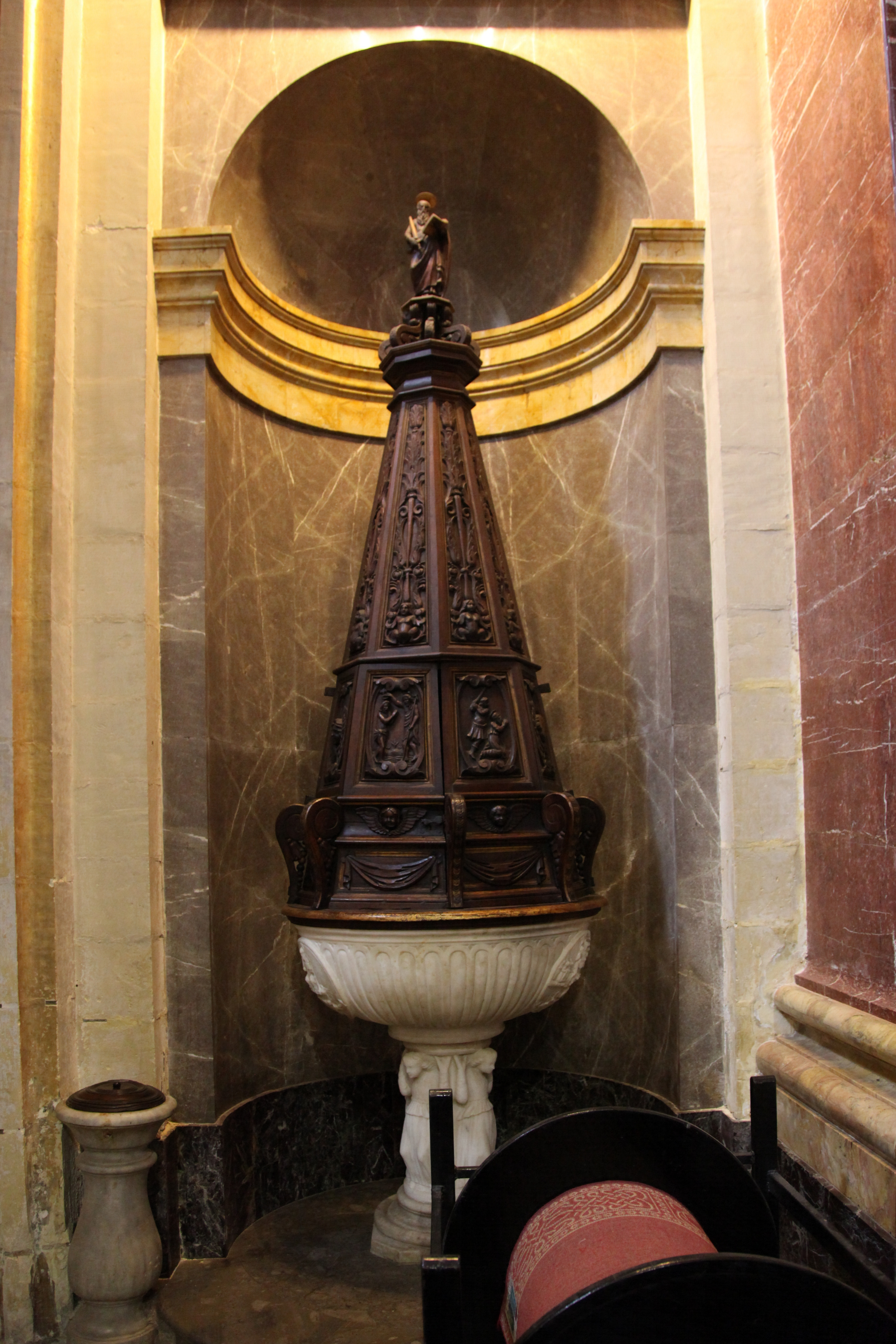
The 15th-century baptismal font

Many artifacts from the pre-1693 cathedral survived the earthquake and were reused to decorate the new cathedral. These include a late Gothic–early Renaissance baptismal font dating back to 1495, the old cathedral's main door which was made in 1530, some 15th-century choir stalls, as well as a number of paintings.

The cathedral's aisles, chapels and sacristy contain several paintings and frescoes, including works by Mattia Preti and his bottega, Francesco Grandi, Domenico Bruschi, Pietro Gagliardi, Bartolomeo Garagona, Francesco Zahra, Luigi Moglia and Alessio Erardi. The titular altarpiece depicts the Conversion of St Paul on the Road to Damascus, and it is the work of Mattia Preti.

Some of the marble used to decorate the cathedral was taken from the Roman ruins of Carthage and Melite. Sculptors and other artists whose work decorates the cathedral include Giuseppe Valenti, Claudio Durante, Alessandro Algardi and Vincent Apap.

== Cathedral Museum ==
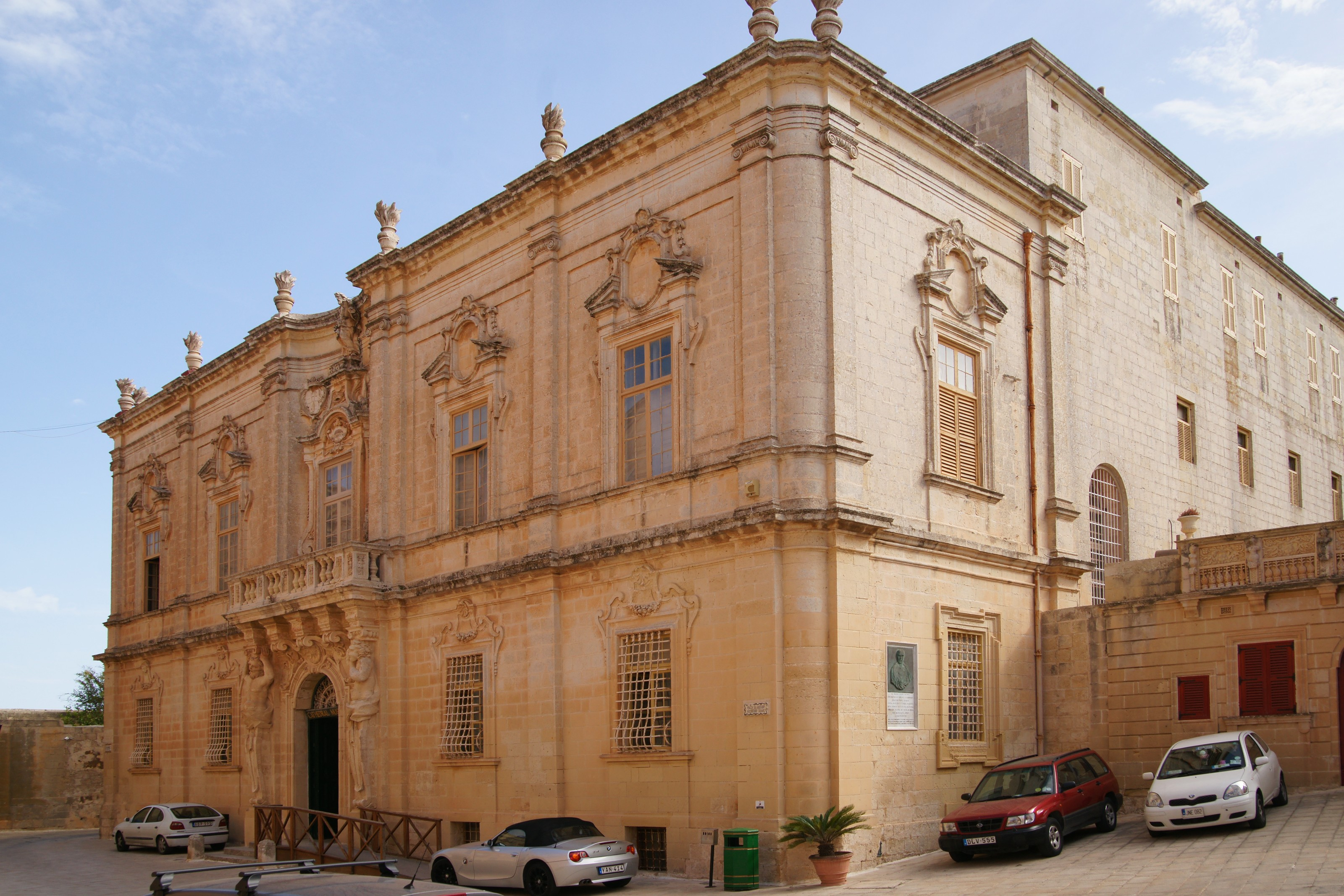
The Cathedral Museum

The Cathedral Museum was established in 1897, and it was initially housed in some halls adjacent to the cathedral. In 1969, the museum was transferred into the former Seminary in Archbishop's Square (Maltese: Pjazza tal-Arċisqof or Misraħ l-Arċisqof) facing the cathedral's side entrance. The Seminary had been built between 1733 and 1742 in the Baroque style. It is attributed to the architects Giovanni Barbara or Andrea Belli, although Barbara was dead when construction began, leaving Belli as the more likely candidate.

The museum's collection includes an eclectic secular and ecclesiastical repertoire. This includes religious and profane artworks spanning from the 14th to the early 20th century, including a number of medieval panels formerly located in the cathedral; a money gallery with a forte in its numerous coins of antiquity (closed for refurbishment as of early 2020); religious and domestic silverware, religious vestments, historical furniture and the museum's flagship collection, a permanent exhibition of 76 original woodcuts by Albrecht Dürer.

== See also ==
- Culture of Malta
- History of Malta
- List of churches in Malta
- Religion in Malta
