= Mogila =

Mogila may refer to:

== Places ==
- Mogila, Kosovo, a village in Kosovo
- Mogila, North Macedonia, a village in the Republic of Macedonia
  - Mogila Municipality
  - FK Mogila, a football club
- Mogiła, Lublin Voivodeship, a village in Poland
- Mogiła Abbey, in Poland
- Mogila, Shumen Province, a village in Kaspichan Municipality, Bulgaria
- Mogila, Stara Zagora Province, a village in Stara Zagora Municipality, Bulgaria
- Mogila, Yambol Province, a village in Tundzha Municipality, Bulgaria

== Other uses ==
- Peter Mogila (1596–1647), Metropolitan of Kiev
- Mogiła coat of arms
- Moghilă family, a family of Moldavian nobility
