= Joseph Mercieca =

Maltese prelate

The Most Reverend Joseph Mercieca S.Ġ.
- Archbishop of Malta
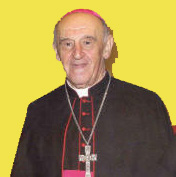
- Native name: Ġużeppi Mercieca
- Church: Roman Catholic Church
- Archdiocese: Archdiocese of Malta
- Province: Malta
- Appointed: 29 November 1976
- In office: 1976–2006
- Predecessor: Mikiel Gonzi
- Successor: Paul Cremona
- Previous posts: Auxiliary Bishop of Malta (1974–1976); Judge of the Sacred Roman Rota (1969–1974); Consulter to the Congregation of the Sacraments and of the Congregation for the Doctrine of Faith (1974–1976); Rector of the Gozo Major Seminary (1959–1969)

Orders
- Ordination: 8 March 1952 by Giuseppe Pace
- Consecration: 29 September 1974 by Mikiel Gonzi

Personal details
- Born: 11 November 1928 Victoria, Gozo, Malta
- Died: 21 March 2016 (aged 87) Żejtun, Malta
- Buried: St. Paul's Cathedral
- Denomination: Roman Catholic

Joseph Mercieca (Maltese: Ġużeppi Mercieca, 11 November 1928 – 21 March 2016) was a Maltese prelate who served as the second Archbishop of Malta from 1976 to 2006. He is credited with restoring stability in the Maltese church following the dispute between the Malta Labour Party and his predecessor Mikiel Gonzi, the then Archbishop of Malta.

== Biography ==
Archbishop Mercieca was born in Victoria on the island of Gozo in Malta. He was baptised on 14 November 1928 and received the other sacraments at the parish church of St George in Victoria. He entered the Gozo seminary to study for the priesthood but continued his studies in Rome at the Gregorian university and the Lateran university. He was ordained to the priesthood in 1952 by His Excellency Joseph Monsignor Pace, Bishop of Gozo, at St James's Church in Victoria, Gozo. In 1958, he was chosen to be the rector of the Gozo Major Seminary. In 1969, the then Father Mercieca was appointed, by Pope Paul VI, to judge the Roman Rota.

Five years later Pope Paul VI appointed him Auxiliary Bishop of Malta to assist Archbishop Gonzi. He was consecrated bishop by His Excellency Sir Mikiel Monsignor Count Gonzi, Archbishop of Malta, on the feast of St Michael in St. John's Co-Cathedral, Valletta. After Archbishop Gonzi retired in 1976, Bishop Mercieca succeeded him. He spent the next thirty years as the spiritual shepherd of the Archdiocese of Malta.

Archbishop Mecieca is credited with restoring stability in the Maltese church following Count Gonzi's dispute with the Malta Labour Party in the 1950s and 1960s. A new dispute between the church and the Labour government arose in the 1980s over church schools and property, but this was resolved without creating long-lasting divisions.

Mercieca was appointed a member of the Xirka Ġieħ ir-Repubblika in 1995.

Archbishop Mercieca offered his resignation to Pope John Paul II on 11 November 2003. He remained archbishop until 2 December 2006, and was succeeded by Paul Monsignor Cremona in January 2007. Archbishop Mercieca had a brother who is also a priest serving in his home parish of St. George in Victoria.

== Death ==
Archbishop Mercieca's health began to deteriorate, and he was unable to attend Charles Scicluna's appointment as Archbishop in February 2015. On 20 March 2016, it was reported that he was in critical condition. He died at 7:20 am the following day in a house in Żejtun. Archbishop Charles Scicluna announced the death via Twitter. President Marie Louise Coleiro Preca, Prime Minister Joseph Muscat and Leader of the Opposition Simon Busuttil also expressed their sadness on Twitter. Flags on government buildings were flown at half-mast for three days to mourn Mercieca.

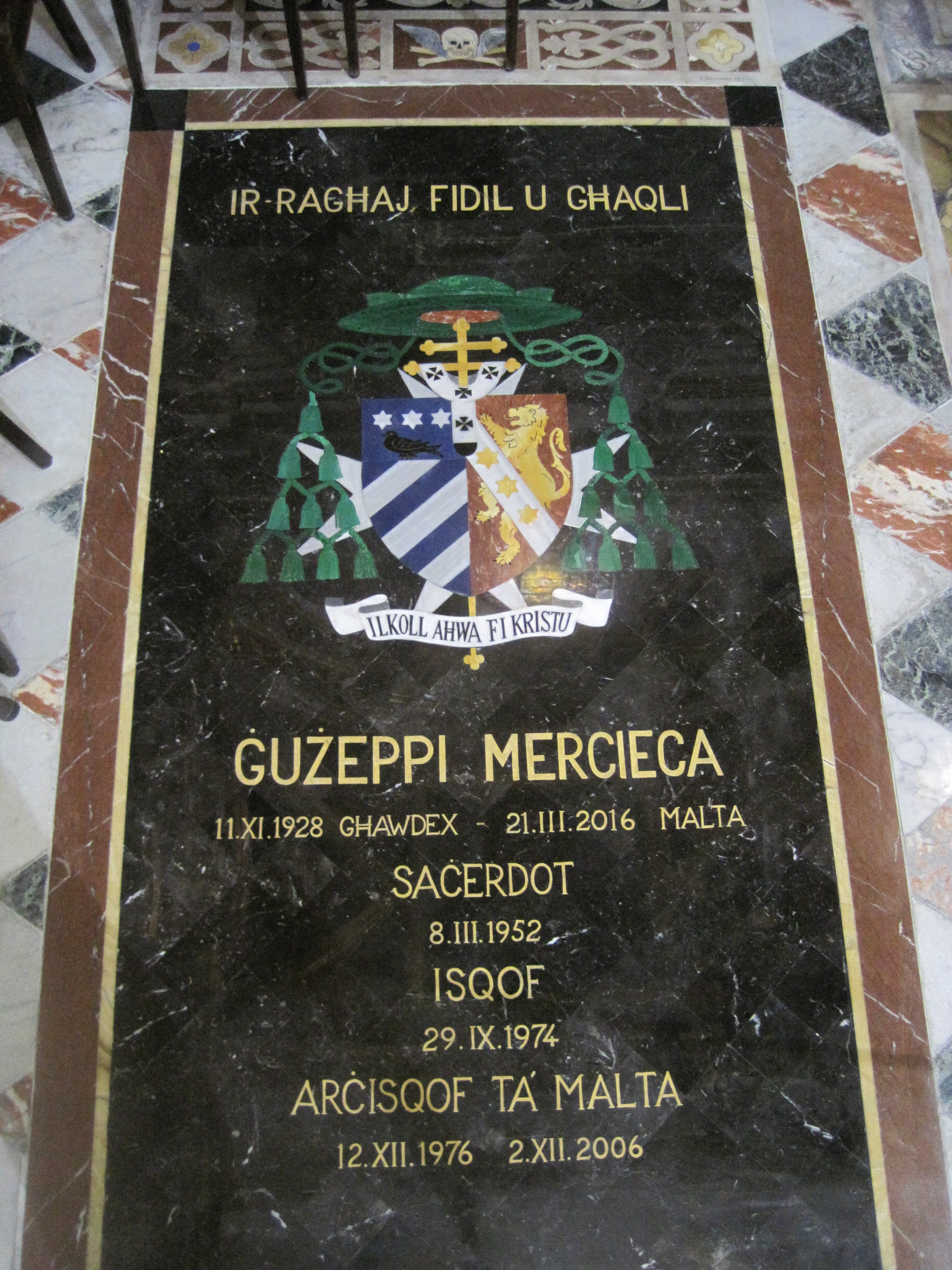
Gravestone in St. Paul's Cathedral

Mercieca's funeral was held on 23 March at St. John's Co-Cathedral in Valletta, and he was buried at St. Paul's Cathedral in Mdina. The funeral was attended by the highest authorities of Malta, including President Marie Louise Coleiro Preca, Evarist Bartolo on behalf of Prime Minister Muscat, and Simon Busuttil.

Catholic Church titles
Preceded by Emanuele Gerada	Auxiliary Bishop of Malta; 1974–1976	Succeeded by Annetto Depasquale
Preceded by Michael Gonzi	Archbishop of Malta; 1976–2006	Succeeded by Paul Cremona
