= George Preca =

Maltese Roman Catholic priest (1880–1962)

Saint George Preca T.OCarm
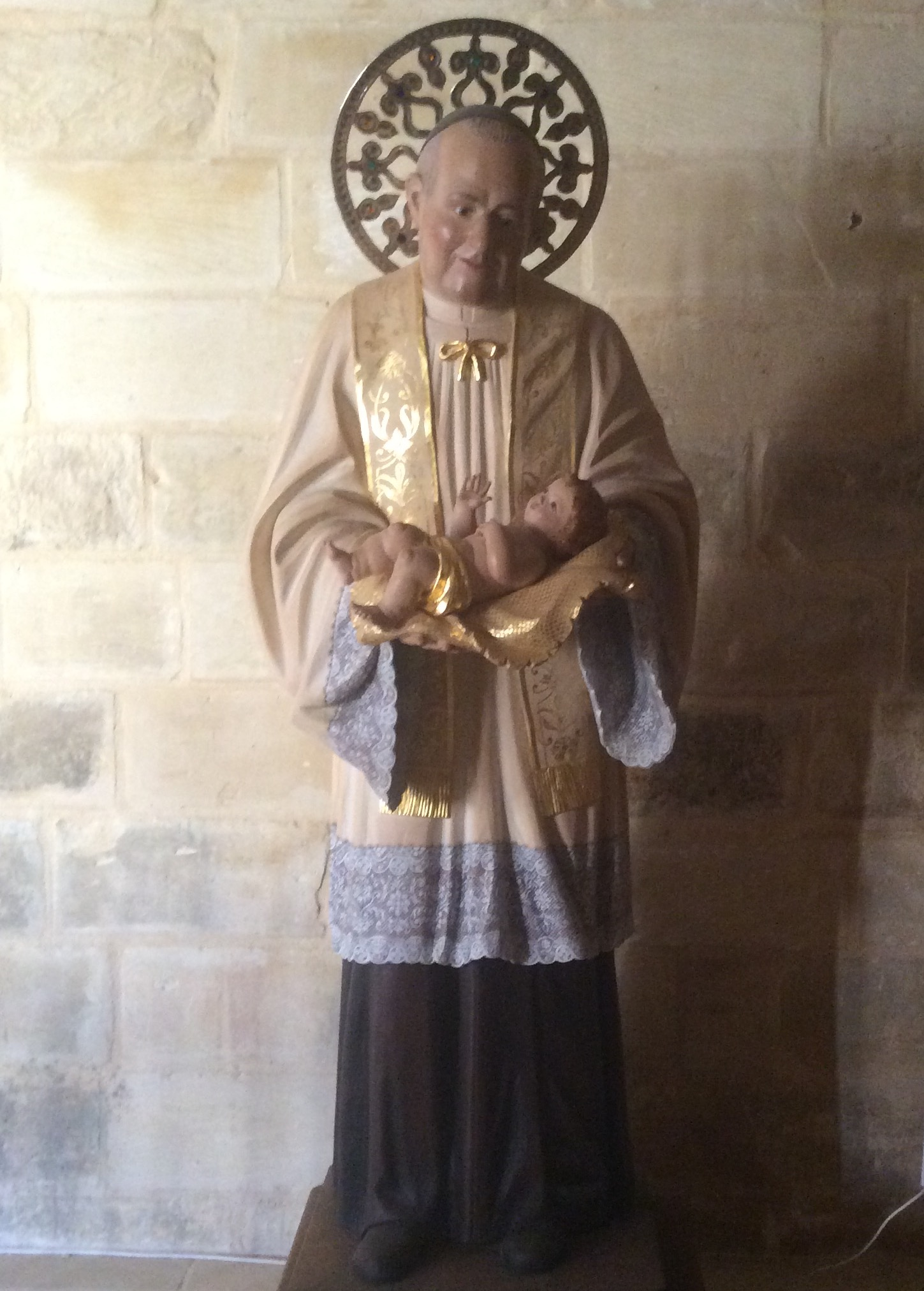
- Statue at Montekristo Estates, Ħal Farruġ

Priest
- Born: 12 February 1880; Valletta, Crown Colony of Malta
- Died: 26 July 1962 (aged 82); Santa Venera, Crown Colony of Malta
- Venerated in: Catholic Church
- Beatified: 9 May 2001, Floriana, Malta by Pope John Paul II
- Canonized: 3 June 2007, Saint Peter's Square, Vatican City by Pope Benedict XVI
- Feast: 9 May
- Attributes: Priest's attire
- Patronage: Malta; Swatar, Malta; Ħamrun, Malta; Society of Christian Doctrine; Catechists

George Franco Preca, T.OCarm (in Maltese: Ġorġ Preca) (12 February 1880 – 26 July 1962) was a Maltese Catholic priest, the founder of the Society of Christian Doctrine and a Third Order Carmelite. Pope John Paul II dubbed him "Malta’s second father in faith".

He assumed the religious name of "Franco" after becoming a Third Order Carmelite. He was a popular figure among some groups, and his pastoral care and religious teaching earned recognition. However, his activities raised suspicions of heresy from senior clergy. He was ordered to close down his teaching centres for a time while they could be investigated; they were subsequently re-opened.

His activism earned him praise and in 1952, Pope Pius XII nominated him as a papal privy chamberlain and awarded the rank of Monsignor.

In 1957 he composed five new mysteries for the Rosary for his followers which he referred to as the "Mysteries of Light". These seemed to have been the basis for the 5 Luminous Mysteries promoted by Saint John Paul II in 2002 in his Apostolic Letter Rosarium Virginis Mariae. He was canonized as a saint in 2007.

== Life ==
George Preca was born in Valletta on 12 February 1880 as the seventh of nine children of Vincent and Nathalie Ceravolo Preca. His father was both a merchant and a health inspector. He received his baptism on 17 February 1880 in the Church of Our Lady of Porto Salvo. Preca was a frail child due to a range of illnesses he had and in 1885 almost drowned in the harbour though boatmen rescued him.

In 1886, the family relocated to Ħamrun. He received both his First Communion at some stage in his childhood and then his Confirmation on 2 August 1888 in the Parish Church of St Cajetan, Ħamrun.

In 1897, while walking along with the Maglio Gardens in Floriana, Ġorġ Preca met one of his professors, Father Ercole Mompalao, who encouraged his religious vocation. Preca first studied at the state-owned school on the island before he commenced his studies for the priesthood; he had studied Latin and English but also studied Italian and received a prize in handwriting. Shortly before his ordination, Preca was diagnosed with acute pulmonary tuberculosis and given a poor prognosis. He attributed his recovery to the intercession of Saint Joseph, patron of the dying, however, the illness left him with a damaged left lung.

On 8 April 1905 his confessor Aloysius Galea died and Preca would often recount that not long after Galea seemingly appeared to him and encouraged his call to the priesthood. In his studies he began to write a rule in Latin for use in a planned religious movement for permanent deacons that he wished to establish but this desire subsided over time. The idea remained much on Preca's mind but he altered the idea after being ordained. Preca received his ordination to the priesthood alongside thirteen others on 22 December 1906 from Bishop Pietro Pace and he celebrated his first Mass on 25 December – Christmas – at the Saint Cajetan parish church in Ħamrun. He was appointed assistant priest at St. Gaetano, and immediately devoted himself to teaching the youth.

== M.U.S.E.U.M. ==
He began to teach the Catholic catechism along the waterfront to people, including labourers, and to gather male catechists including Ewgenju Borg around him. In February 1907 he arranged a spiritual conference at the Ta' Nuzzo church; later meetings were held at 6 Fra Diegu Street. This led to the founding of a new religious movement on 7 March 1907 at Ħamrun at the first meeting of the Society of Christian Doctrine (known locally as M.U.S.E.U.M.).

Senior clergy began to suspect that the rapid growth and popularity of Preca's movement could have heretical implications, especially as it involved so many of the low skilled and uneducated. The Vicar General, Mgr Salvatore Grech, issued an order in 1909 that all the "MUSEUM centres" should be closed. A protest by other parish priests led to the order being rescinded. Nevertheless, the new society continued to receive criticism in the press, and in 1916 Bishop Maurus Caruana opened a formal enquiry. This cleared the movement of any negative behaviour and paved the way in due course for ecclesiastical recognition of the Society of Christian Doctrine on 12 April 1932.

It was at the height of the crisis that Preca claimed to have received a powerful religious experience in 1910 one morning as he passed the Marsa Cross – triggered by a child aged twelve pushing a cart with a bag of manure who had shouted: "Lend me a hand!". Preca helped him and as he placed his hands on the cart he felt profound spiritual calmness and understood that he had experienced a revelation as the boy symbolized Christ and the wagon, the work of evangelizing.

Preca became a Third Order Carmelite after being admitted on 21 July 1918, and made his profession on 26 September 1919 with the new religious name of "Franco". In the parishes, Preca established Nativity plays at Christmas time; a custom maintained to this day in almost all the parishes of Malta.

In the 1950s Fr Preca himself sent six members of the Society to Australia to serve the Maltese who had emigrated to Melbourne. As of 2016, there were 1,200 members serving in six countries.

Despite his ability in Italian and English, Preca taught and wrote in Maltese, the language of the common people, so that everyone could understand. He wrote about 150 booklets, pamphlets and leaflets. To publish and spread his works, he obtained a printing press and founded in the 1920s what would become Veritas Press, one of the main Catholic publishing companies in Malta.

Throughout his pastoral mission he was a popular preacher and sought-after confessor. Preca was named as a Monsignor after Pope Pius XII – on 2 October 1952 – named him a Privy Chamberlain, much to his mortification, and he held this title until the pope died in 1958. He never wore the vestments that the title entailed, nor did he ever claim the official document from the archbishop's office.

Preca died in the evening of 26 July 1962. His funeral on 28 July was one of the largest funerals ever held in Malta and Bishop Emanuel Galea presided over it at the Saint Cajetan church.

== Mysteries of Light ==
In 1957 Preca wrote five mysteries which he called the "Mysteries of Light" (il-Misteri tad-Dawl) which he said had been inspired by John 8:12: "The light of the world". (Note: In John Paul II's revision of these in 2002, they became: 1)The Baptism of Jesus in the Jordan. 2) The Wedding at Cana. 3) Jesus' Proclamation of the Kingdom of God. 4) The Transfiguration. 5) The Institution of the Eucharist.)

These were:

- After Jesus Christ was baptized in the Jordan, he was led into the desert.
- Jesus reveals Himself as true God by word and by miracles.
- Jesus teaches the Beatitudes on the mountain.
- Jesus is transfigured on the mountain.
- Jesus has His Last Supper with the Apostles.

== Veneration ==
=== Venerable ===
The cause towards canonization by the Catholic Church formally opened on 13 March 1975 under Pope Paul VI when Preca was given the title "Servant of God" after the Congregation for the Causes of Saints issued its official "nihil obstat". Mikiel Gonzi (the Archbishop of Malta) subsequently issued the decree on 24 June 1975 that would pave the path for a full diocesan investigation to begin. The process opening in Malta on 25 February 1976 and continued for over a decade until its solemn closure on 23 June 1988 under Joseph Mercieca. The Congregation validated the process in Rome on 19 June 1992 and the postulator later submitted the Positio for assessment in 1998. A congress of six theologians first approved the cause on 16 March 1999 while the members of the Congregation likewise voted in approval of the cause on 1 June 1999. The confirmation of Preca's model life of "heroic virtue" on 28 June 1999 allowed for Pope John Paul II to grant the title of Venerable

=== Beatification ===
However, for Preca to be beatified a miracle had to be obtained as a result of his intercession - or at least a healing that conventional science could not easily explain. One such miracle was investigated and it received validation from the Congregation on 21 November 1997 before a board of seven medical appointees approved it on 10 June 1999 as did six theologians on 22 October 1999 and then the Congregation on 11 January 2000. The Pope expressed his view on 27 January 2000 that this healing was indeed a miracle and beatified Preca on 9 May 2001 while on a visit to Malta, and referred to him on that visit as the "Second Apostle of Malta" (Saint Paul being the first). The attributed miracle was a healing in February 1964 of Charles Zammit Endrich, who suffered from a detached retina in his left eye. An investigation determined there was no scientific explanation for a healing which occurred after Endrich placed one of Preca's personal belongings under his pillow. His personal doctor Ċensu Tabone (later the President of Malta) was present.

=== Sainthood ===
For Preca to become a saint then another miracle was required. A suitable candidate was found in the alleged healing of an infant, Eric Catania (b. 2002), who suffered from mironodular infantile cirrhosis with acute liver decompensation in addition to ascites and cholestasis and hypocoagulation. The baby was transferred to King's College Hospital, the world's largest and most expert paediatric liver centre. The planned treatment would have been a liver transplant, but doctors were concerned of the risk of organ rejection. The baby's parents were said to have put a glove used during Preca's exhumation on the infant; the child recovered to the point the doctors said an operation was not needed at all. The report received Congregation validation on 17 December 2004 in Rome and then the approval of the Vatican medical board on 23 February 2006. The theologians approved this as well on 30 October 2006 as did the Congregation on 9 January 2007. Pope Benedict XVI approved the healing as a miracle on 22 February 2007 which resulted from Preca's direct intercession, and Preca was canonized on 3 June 2007 in Saint Peter's Square after having formalized the date for the celebration at a consistory on 23 February 2007 at 11:00am. The canonization cemented Preca as the second Maltese saint (Saint Publius being the first) and in his remarks the pope called Preca "a friend of Jesus".

A statue of Preca was unveiled at the church of Saint Cajetan parish in Ħamrun, Malta, during a solemn Mass that Archbishop Paul Cremona presided over on 17 December 2009. A statue was placed on the same spot where Preca used to hear confessions. Beside the statue there is also his relic with a sample of his blood. The bronze statue is the work of sculptor Gianni Bonnici and was made in Caggiati in Parma.

A portrait bust commemorates Preca outside St. Patrick's Cathedral in East Melbourne, Australia.

== See also ==
- Saint George Preca, patron saint archive
