= Joseph Cassar (diplomat) =

Maltese journalist, diplomat, and academic (1947–2018)

Joseph Cassar (22 December 1947 – 19 May 2018) was a Maltese journalist, diplomat and academic who served as a United Nations representative and as an Ambassador to Portugal, Italy, Libya, Russia, and China. He died on 19 May 2018 due to old age.
