= Russian Council of Muftis =

Religious group representing Russian Muslims

- Совет муфтиев России
- Formation: 2 July 1996
- Founded at: Moscow, Russia

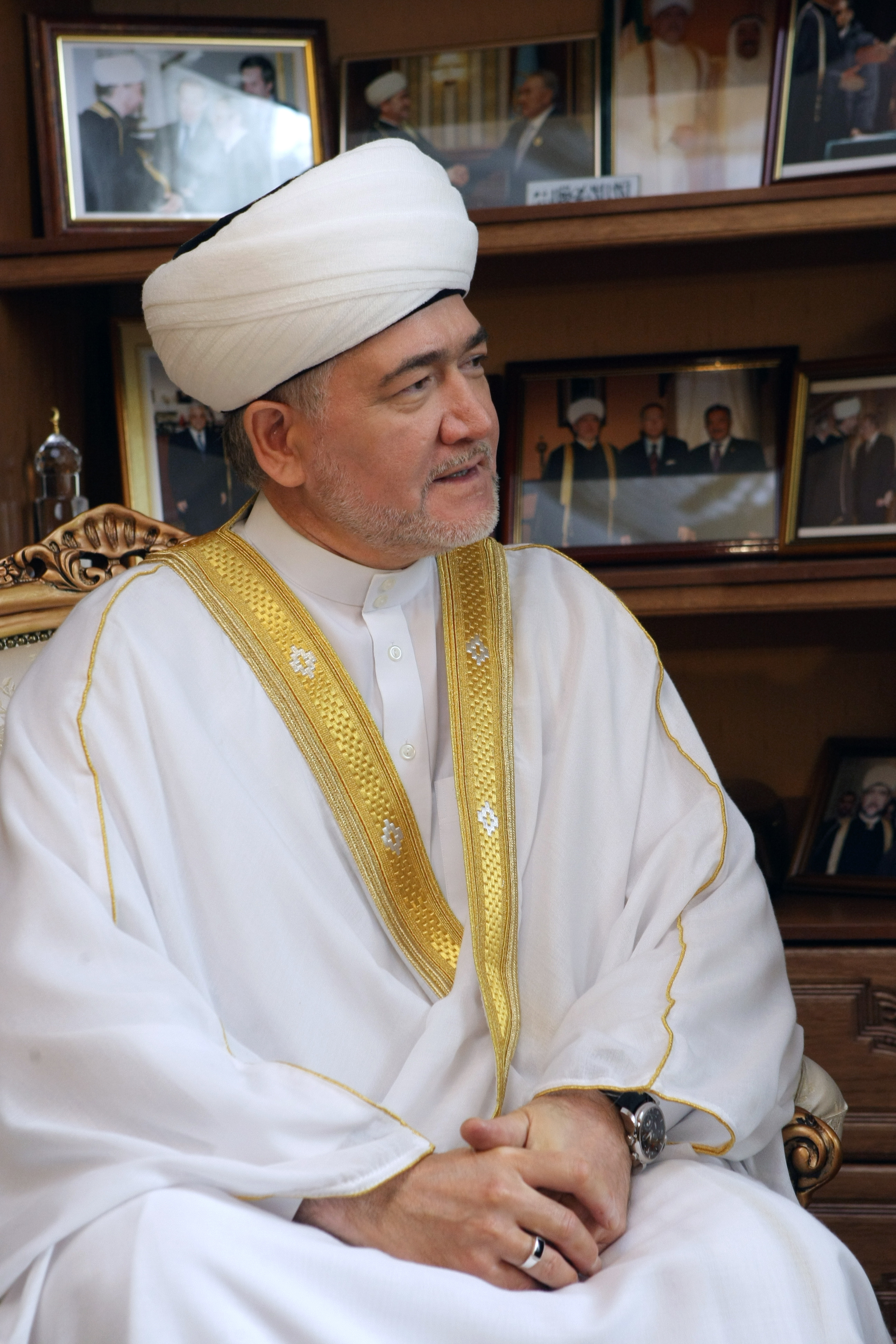
Chairman Sheikh Ravil Gainutdin meeting with Prime Minister Vladimir Putin

The Russian Council of Muftis (Russian: Совет муфтиев России) is a religious group representing the Muslim community of Russia. It was founded on 2 July 1996. The Chairman of the Council is the spiritual leader of the Muslims of Russia.

The Council is responsible for allocating the slots for the Hajj assigned to Russia. In 2012, it demanded a rise in the number of mosques in Moscow, saying they should at least double.

== History ==
The Council of Muftis of Russia was founded on July 2, 1996 in Moscow at a meeting of muftis convened by the chairman of the Spiritual Administration of Muslims of the Central European Region of Russia Ravil Gainutdin, elected chairman of the new association. In addition to the DUMCER, the Spiritual Administrations of the Muslims of the Volga region, Tatarstan, Siberia, the Orenburg region and others became co-founders.

On November 25, 1998, the Council of Muftis of Russia merged with the Supreme Coordination Center of the Spiritual Administration of Muslims of Russia and the Coordination Center of Muslims of the North Caucasus.

In February 2009, the Council of Muftis received a warning from the Ministry of Justice of the Russian Federation due to the discovery during the inspection of violations of the legislation of the Russian Federation—violations that were later corrected.

In December 2009, negotiations and consultations began between the heads of Muslim organizations in Russia, the Central Spiritual Muslim Board and the Spiritual Muslim Board of the Russian Federation, including the SMF, on their merger into a single structure, but due to disagreements between Talgat Tadzhudinnov and Ravil Gainutdinov, the process of merging Muslim organizations was suspended for an indefinite period.

In the mid-2010s, after the largest member of the Council of Muftis of Russia was transformed into the Spiritual Administration of Muslims of the Russian Federation, becoming one of the all-Russian muftis, the RMC, in turn, became a purely representative body a number of spiritual boards of Muslims.
