= Luigi Moglia =

Luigi Moglia (active in Rome during c. 1850 to 1870) was an Italian mosaicist, who worked in the Studio Vaticano del Mosaico (Mosaic Studio of the Vatican).

His expertise was in copies in micromosaic of famous artworks of Rome. The Museo Borgogna in Vercelli has a reproduction of Guido Reni's large fresco of the Aurora in the Palazzo Pallavicini Rospigliosi, Rome. The museum also has micromosaic works by Michelangelo Barbieri. The work was purchased from the auction of the Demidoff possessions in Florence.
