= Paul Cremona =

Maltese Catholic bishop (1946–2025)

The Most Reverend Pawl Cremona O.P.
- Archbishop Emeritus of Malta
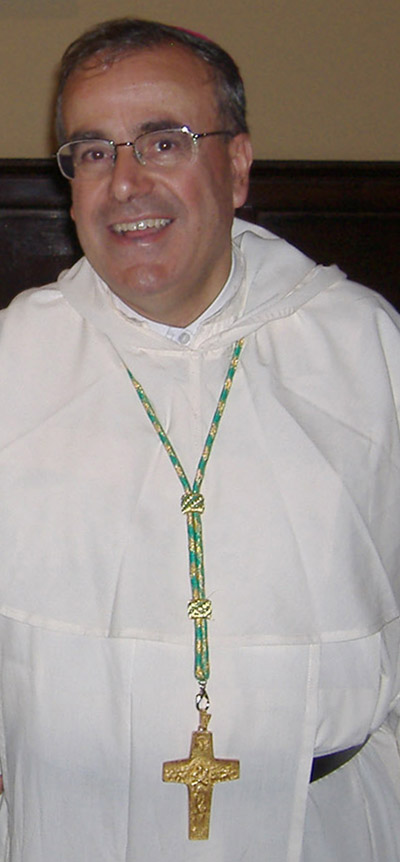
- Church: Catholic Church
- Archdiocese: Malta
- Appointed: 2 December 2006
- Term ended: 17 October 2014
- Predecessor: Joseph Mercieca
- Successor: Charles Scicluna
- Previous posts: Parish priest, Sliema

Orders
- Ordination: 22 March 1969 by Mikiel Gonzi
- Consecration: 26 January 2007 by Joseph Mercieca

Personal details
- Born: 25 January 1946 Valletta, Crown Colony of Malta
- Died: 18 March 2025 (aged 79) Mater Dei Hospital, Msida, Malta
- Education: Pontifical University of Saint Thomas Aquinas
- Motto: Ħejju T-Triq Għall-Mulej
- Coat of arms

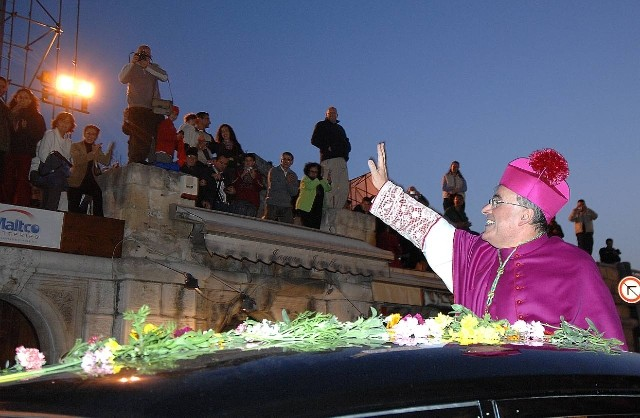
Mgr. Cremona arriving in Valletta as new Archbishop of Malta

Paul Cremona OP (Maltese: Pawl Cremona; 25 January 1946 – 18 March 2025) was a Maltese Roman Catholic prelate who was the Archbishop of Malta from 2007 to 2014. He was also a Dominican friar.

== Early life ==
Cremona was born in Valletta on 25 January 1946 to Joseph and Josephine (née Cauchi) Cremona. He had two siblings: an elder brother and a younger sister. He attended the Montessori School in Valletta and the Lyceum in Ħamrun.

In September 1962, Cremona joined the Dominican Order and was professed on 29 September 1963. He studied philosophy and theology at the College of St Thomas Aquinas located at the Dominican priory at Rabat.

== Priest ==
Cremona was ordained as priest on 22 March 1969. After his ordination, he studied at the Pontifical University of St. Thomas Aquinas Angelicum and earned his doctorate in sacred theology (STD) in 1973 with a thesis entitled The Concept of Peace in Pope John XXIII.

Cremona was elected Prior of Our Lady of the Grotto, Rabat, in 1974, and held that position from 1974 to 1980 and from 1997 to 2003. He was Dominican Prior Provincial of Malta from 1981 to 1989.

In 1989, Cremona was appointed parish priest of Our Lady of Fatima Parish in Gwardamanġa, Pietà, where he served until 1993. He then became responsible for the formation of Dominican novices and students at Rabat, an office he again held between 2004 and 2005. In 2005, Cremona became parish priest of Jesus of Nazareth in Sliema.

Cremona held other offices in the Archdiocese of Malta, including Archbishop's Delegate for Consecrated Life, assistant spiritual director at the Seminary at Tal-Virtù, Rabat, member of the Presbyterial Council, and president of the Council of Maltese Religious Major Superiors (KSMR).

== Bishop ==
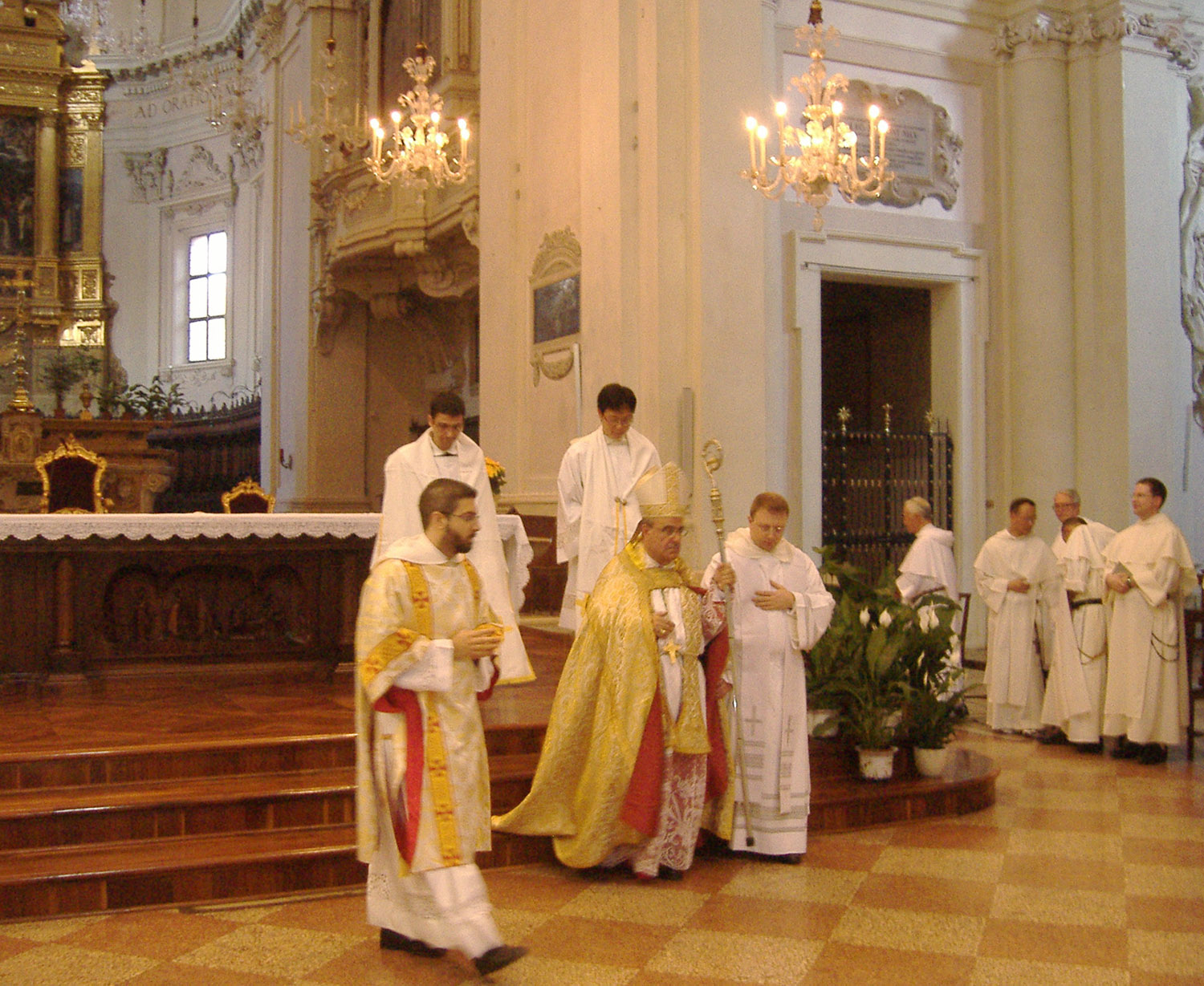
Mgr. Cremona in Bologna, at Basilica of San Domenico, 3 July 2007

Cremona was appointed the eleventh Archbishop of Malta on 2 December 2006. He received his episcopal consecration on 26 January 2007 at the Co-Cathedral of St. John the Baptist in Valletta from the retiring Archbishop of Malta, Joseph Mercieca, assisted by the Apostolic Nuncio, Archbishop Félix del Blanco Prieto, and Bishop George Frendo, Cremona's former schoolmate. Cremona invoked Bishop Saint Augustine: "For you I am a Bishop but with you I am a Christian."

In 2007, Cremona was appointed Grand Prior for Malta of the Equestrian Order of the Holy Sepulchre of Jerusalem with the rank of Knight Grand Officer.

As Archbishop of Malta, Cremona was a popular preacher for Lenten sermons. He wrote works on theology and spirituality, including on the Creed and the Commandments. He also co-authored works with George Frendo, his schoolmate and fellow bishop.

== Resignation ==
Members of the Episcopal Curia said that the archdiocese lacked leadership under Cremona. In August 2014, Cremona was asked whether he would resign and replied: "I hold this position in obedience to the Pope's wishes and will only leave in obedience." On 17 October 2014, Cremona submitted his resignation as Archbishop of Malta and Pope Francis approved it the same day. He said the next day that he had thought of resigning two years earlier, due to exhaustion. Cremona was the first bishop of Malta to resign prior to retirement age since the 19th-century. Charles Scicluna was appointed Apostolic Administrator and later Archbishop of Malta by Pope Francis on 27 February 2015.

== Death and Funeral ==
Cremona died following a long illness at Mater Dei Hospital, on 18 March 2025, at the age of 79. He had initially spent his retirement at the Dominican Friary in Rabat, Malta, before spending his final years at Id-Dar tal-Kleru in Birkirkara, a home specifically for retired priests.

His funeral took place at St. John's Co-Cathedral in Valletta, on 22 March 2025. Archbishop Charles Scicluna presided at the funeral, which was attended by numerous dignitaries including Cardinal Mario Grech the President Myriam Spiteri Debono, Prime Minister Robert Abela, Opposition Leader Bernard Grech, Chief Justice Mark Chetcuti. Former presidents Marie Louise Coleiro Preca and George Abela, and former Prime Ministers Joseph Muscat and Lawrence Gonzi were also present.

Following the funeral, his remains were transported to Rabat, where he was laid to rest in a private burial ceremony.

Catholic Church titles
Preceded by Joseph Mercieca	Archbishop of Malta; 2007–2014	Succeeded by Charles Scicluna
