= Adrian Doyle =

Adrian Doyle may refer to:

- Adrian Conan Doyle (1910–1970), youngest son of Sir Arthur Conan Doyle
- Adrian Leo Doyle (born 1936), Australian prelate of the Roman Catholic Church
