= Henry Hunter (architect) =

Australian architect (1832–1892)

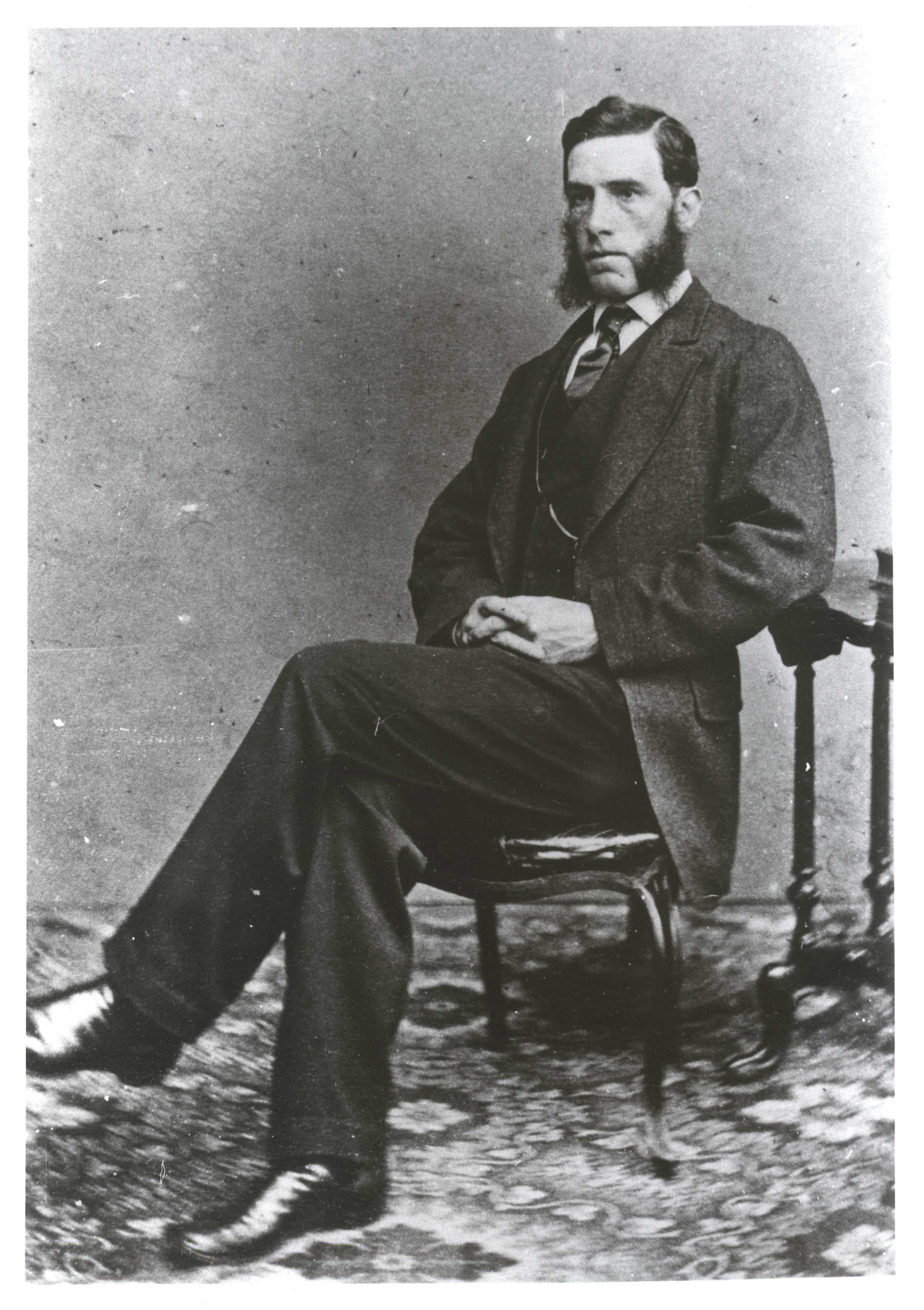
- Born: 10 October 1832; Nottingham, United Kingdom
- Died: 17 October 1892 (aged 60); Brisbane, Colony of Queensland
- Education: Nottingham School of Design
- Occupation: Architect
- Practice: Crawford Padas Shurman Architects
- Buildings: Hobart Town Hall, Tasmanian Museum and Art Gallery

Henry Hunter (1832–1892) was a prominent architect and civil servant in Tasmania and Queensland, Australia. He is best known for his work on churches. During his life was also at various times a state magistrate of Tasmania, a member of the Tasmanian State Board of Education, the Hobart Board of Health, a Commissioner for the New Norfolk Insane Asylum and President of the Queensland Institute of Architects.

== Life ==
Hunter was born in Nottingham, England, son of Walter and Tomasina Hunter. His father was also an architect, and he studied the craft under his father before attending the Nottingham School of Design. He immigrated to Australia in 1848 with his two sisters and parents, originally settling in South Australia before moving to Tasmania. Upon the death of his parents 2–3 years after arrival in Australia, he moved to Tasmania where his older brother George Hunter, Archdeacon of St Joseph's, had already settled.

Hunter spent a short period in the Victorian goldfields on his way to Tasmania, before properly immigrating to the island state. He became engaged in the Huon Valley timber trade for several years, and in 1858 married a Miss Robertson – orphan daughter of an officer. He began work as an architect the same year.

He worked in Tasmania for 37 years, during which he also engaged in a number of civic roles and was a noted local singer. He co-starred with Amy Sherwin in an amateur performance of Il trovatore, and was leader of the St Joseph's Church Choir for 30 years. He moved to Brisbane in 1888 where he opened an architectural firm with his former apprentice Leslie Corrie. Upon his departure a farewell dinner was organised by builders and architects of Hobart, attended by the Lord Mayor of Hobart, Premier of Tasmania and the state Attorney General. During his time in Brisbane he remained a prominent architect, being President of the Queensland Institute of Architects in 1890 and Vice President in 1891. His most notable works in Brisbane were additions made to the All Hallows' School convent and the design of the Queensland Deposit Bank.

== Works ==
=== Public buildings ===
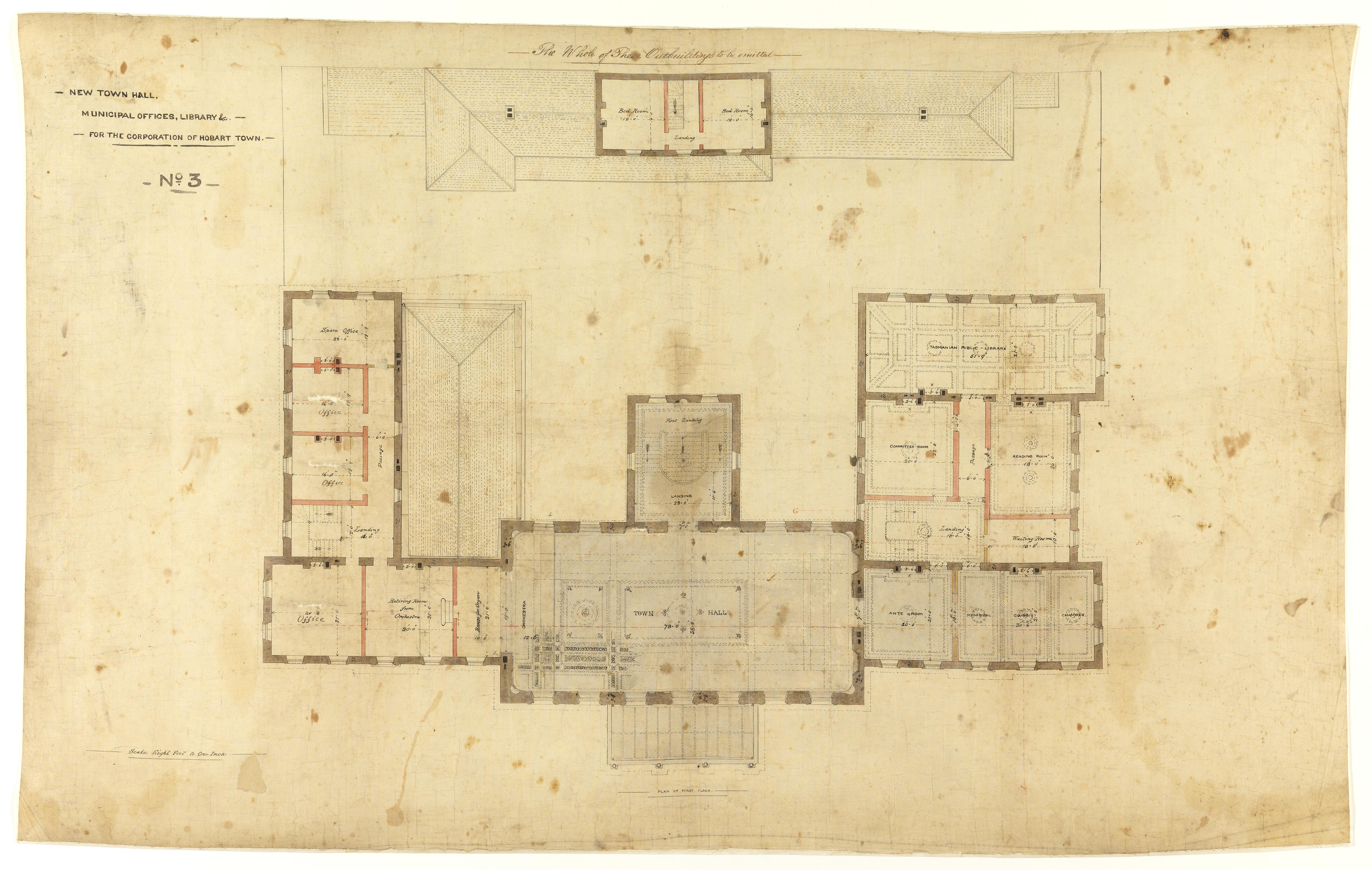
Henry Hunter's plans for Hobart Town Hall

- Hobart Town Hall, Hobart
- Tasmanian Museum and Art Gallery, Hobart (later extensions not by him)
- Old Marine Board Building, Hobart
- St Joseph's Orphanage, Hobart (demolished)
- General Hospital, Hobart (demolished)

=== Churches ===
- St David's Cathedral, Hobart (supervising architect)
- St Mary's Cathedral, Hobart (supervisor of the first cathedral, built in 1860 and partly demolished in 1876 due to faulty work. Second cathedral designed by Hunter)
- St Joseph's Catholic Church, Hobart (extended and improved the sanctuary, 1856)
- St Mary's Anglican Church, Hagley (with Richard Cromwell Carpenter)
- Church of the Apostles, Launceston
- St James Anglican Church, Jericho
- St Michael's Catholic Church, Campbell Town
- St John's Church, Franklin
- St Mary's Church, Franklin
- All Saints Anglican Church, South Hobart
- The Mariners Church (now St Peters, Sandy Bay/Wellspring Anglican)
- St Peter's Church, New Norfolk
- Holy Redeemers Church, Deloraine
- Holy Trinity Catholic Church, Westbury
- St John's Church, Glenorchy
- St Peter's Church, Fingal
- St Johns Church, Ross
- St Patrick's Church, Latrobe
- All Saints Church, Swansea
- Sacred Heart Church, Ulverstone
- St James Church, Cygnet (demolished)
- St Mary Our Hope Catholic Church, Dover
- St Thomas's Catholic Church, Sorell
- St Matthew's Catholic Church, Brighton
- St Aloysius' Church, Kingston

=== Residences ===
- Macquarie Manor, Hobart
- Stonehenge House, Oatlands
- Ashleigh House, Hobart
- Glenelg House, Gretna
- Airlie House, Hobart
- Lebrena House, Hobart
- 2 Mawhera Ave, Hobart
- Selborne, Hobart
- Bishopscourt, Hobart
- St John's Church (now Pendragon Hall) Parsonage, Goulburn Street, Hobart
- 121 Harrington Street, Hobart.
- Gattonside, Battery Point
- Maffra, Glebe (former home of Errol Flynn)
- Maylands, New Town
- Fairmont, Hobart

=== Schools ===
- Presentation House, Sacred Heart Catholic Primary School, Launceston
- Macquarie Street State School, Hobart (now former Macquarie St Adult Education building)
- parts of All Hallows' Convent, Brisbane (with Corrie)
- Trinity Hill State School, North Hobart (demolished)
- New Norfolk State School (now New Norfolk Primary School)
- Battery Point Model School (burnt down/demolished)
- St Columba's School, Hobart (demolished)
- Convent of St Mary's College, Hobart
- Wattle Hill Schoolhouse, Sorell.(now a residence)
- Campbell Town Public School, Campbell Town (now Campbell Town Online Access Centre)

=== Other ===
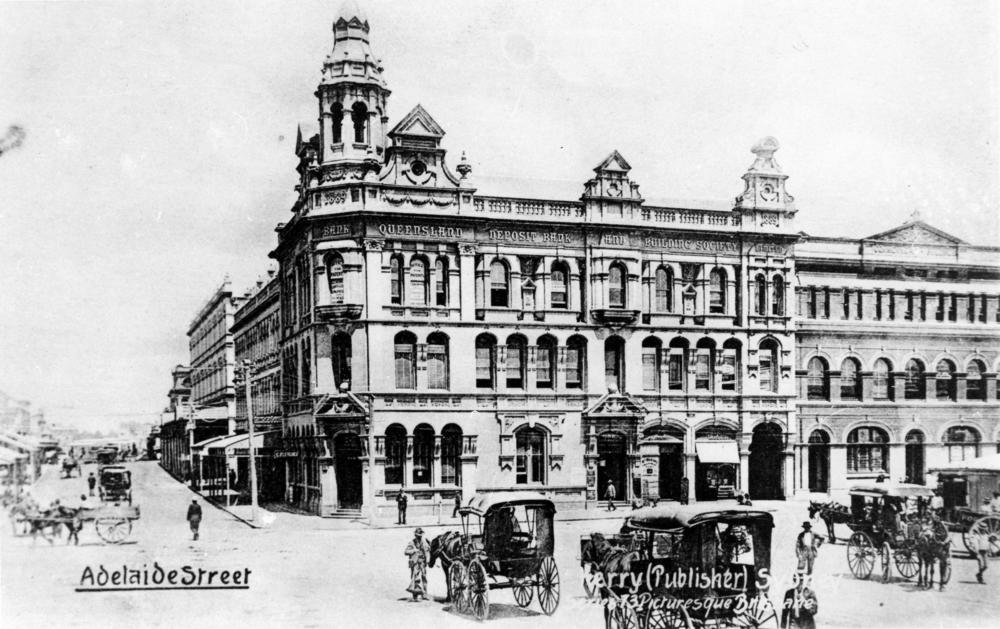
The Queensland Deposit Bank building in 1903.

- 24 Murray St (Old Masonic Hall), Hobart
- Bank of Van Diemen's Land (erected 1885, demolished 1958)
- Tasmanian Steam Navigation Company Offices, Hobart (demolished)
- Royal Insurance Building (previously Derwent and Tamar Building), Hobart
- AMP Building, Hobart (demolished, entrance arch stands in Royal Hobart Botanical Gardens)
- Queensland Deposit Bank and Building Society, Brisbane (with Corrie)
- Eagle Farm Racecourse, Brisbane (with Corrie and JH Buckeridge)
- Cornelian Bay Cemetery chapel, superintendents residence and shelter, Cornelian Bay
- Tomb of Dr Maddox, Launceston

== Legacy ==
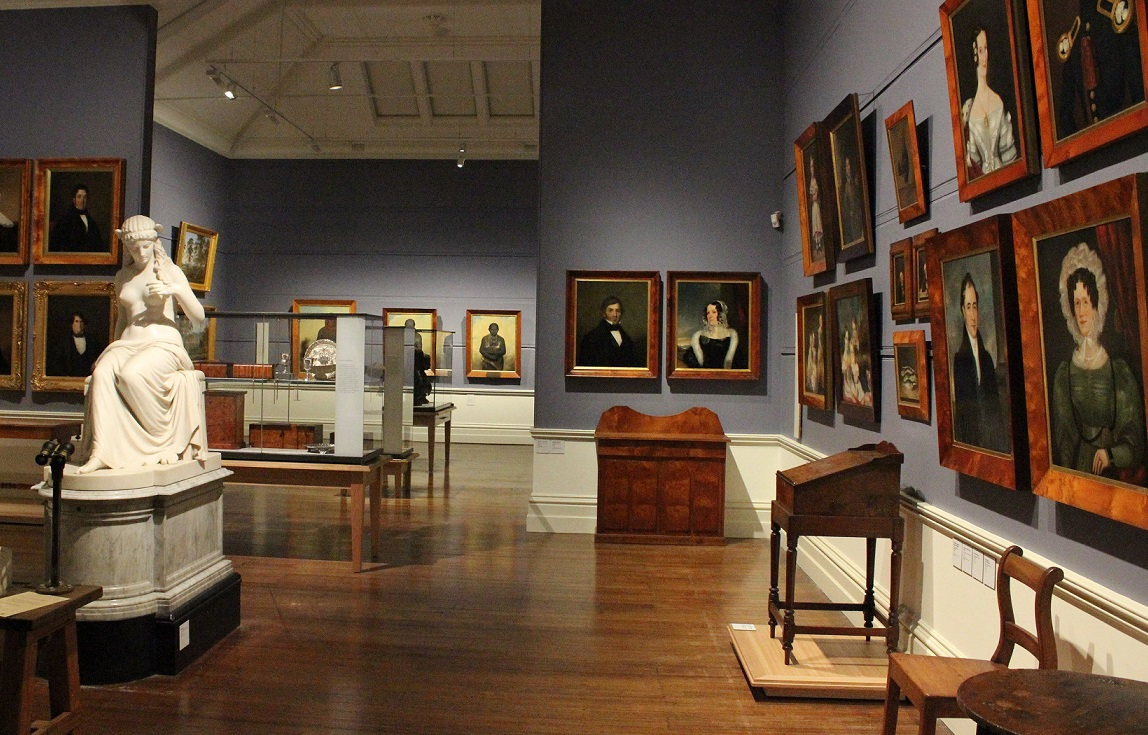
The Henry Hunter gallery in the Tasmanian Museum and Art Gallery

The Henry Hunter Prize for Architect is a prize awarded triennially to architectural projects that involve the "recycling or conservation of historic buildings". The Henry Hunter Galleries, the main permanent art exhibition at the Tasmanian Museum and Art Gallery are also named in his honour. A collection of 1800 of his architectural drawings and notes are held by the Tasmanian Museum and Art Gallery.

In 2006 the architectural firm founded by him (presently known as Crawford Padas Shurman Architects) celebrated its 150th anniversary of continuous business.

Several of his apprentices went on to be influential architects in their own right; Alan Cameron Walker went on to construct several other notable Tasmanian landmarks, including the General Post Office, Hobart and Leslie Corrie went on to become a prominent Brisbane architect and later Mayor of Brisbane.
