= Patrick Delany (bishop) =

Irish-born Catholic bishop in Australia (1853–1926)

- Archbishop of Hobart
- Church: Catholic Church
- Archdiocese: Archdiocese of Hobart
- In office: 29 December 1907 – 7 May 1926
- Predecessor: Daniel Murphy
- Successor: William Barry
- Previous posts: Titular Archbishop of Laranda (1893-1907); Coadjutor Archbishop of Hobart (1893-1907)

Orders
- Ordination: 9 November 1879 by Christopher Augustine Reynolds
- Consecration: 10 December 1893 by John Bede Polding

Personal details
- Born: 1 February 1853 Tonacurra (east of Mountbellew), County Galway, United Kingdom of Great Britain and Ireland
- Died: 7 May 1926 (aged 73) Hobart, Tasmania, Australia, British Empire

Patrick Delany (1853–1926), was an Irish-born Roman Catholic priest who served as Archbishop of Hobart, Tasmania.

Delany was born on 1 February 1853 at Tonacor, parish of Killian, County Galway, Ireland, son of John Delany and his wife Margaret, née Mannion. He was educated by the Franciscans in Mountbellew and at Jesuits' St Ignatius College, Galway.

After initially attending the Jesuit novitiate, Milltown Park, Dublin, in September 1874 he went to the Vincentian missionary college, All Hallows College, Dublin, training for St Paul's, Minnesota, United States of America. He was ordained on 9 November 1879, but instead of going to Minnesota he engaged in further studies in St. Sulpice, Paris, gaining the degree of Bachelor of Sacred Theology from the Institut Catholique de Paris. Returning to All Hallows he lectured in history and canon law. Delany moved to Australia in 1885 seeking support for All Hallows and worked for Bishop James Moore. Going to Rome in 1890 he was awarded a Doctorate of Divinity by Pope Leo XIII. Appointed co-adjutor bishop of Hobart in 1893, in 1907 he succeeded Bishop Murphy as the third Archbishop of Hobart.

He was instrumental in Christian Brothers coming to Tasmania, initially taking charge of St Virgil's College in Hobart and developing St. Patricks College.

Delany died on 7 May 1926 at Hobart and was buried in St Mary's Cathedral. He was succeeded by William Barry, a fellow Irishman and All Hallows graduate, who was co-adjutor bishop.

Catholic Church titles
| Preceded by Daniel Murphy | 3rd Archbishop of Hobart; 1907–1926 | Succeeded by William Barry |
