= Robert Willson (bishop) =

Roman Catholic bishop (1794–1866)

The Most Reverend Robert Willson
- Bishop of Hobart
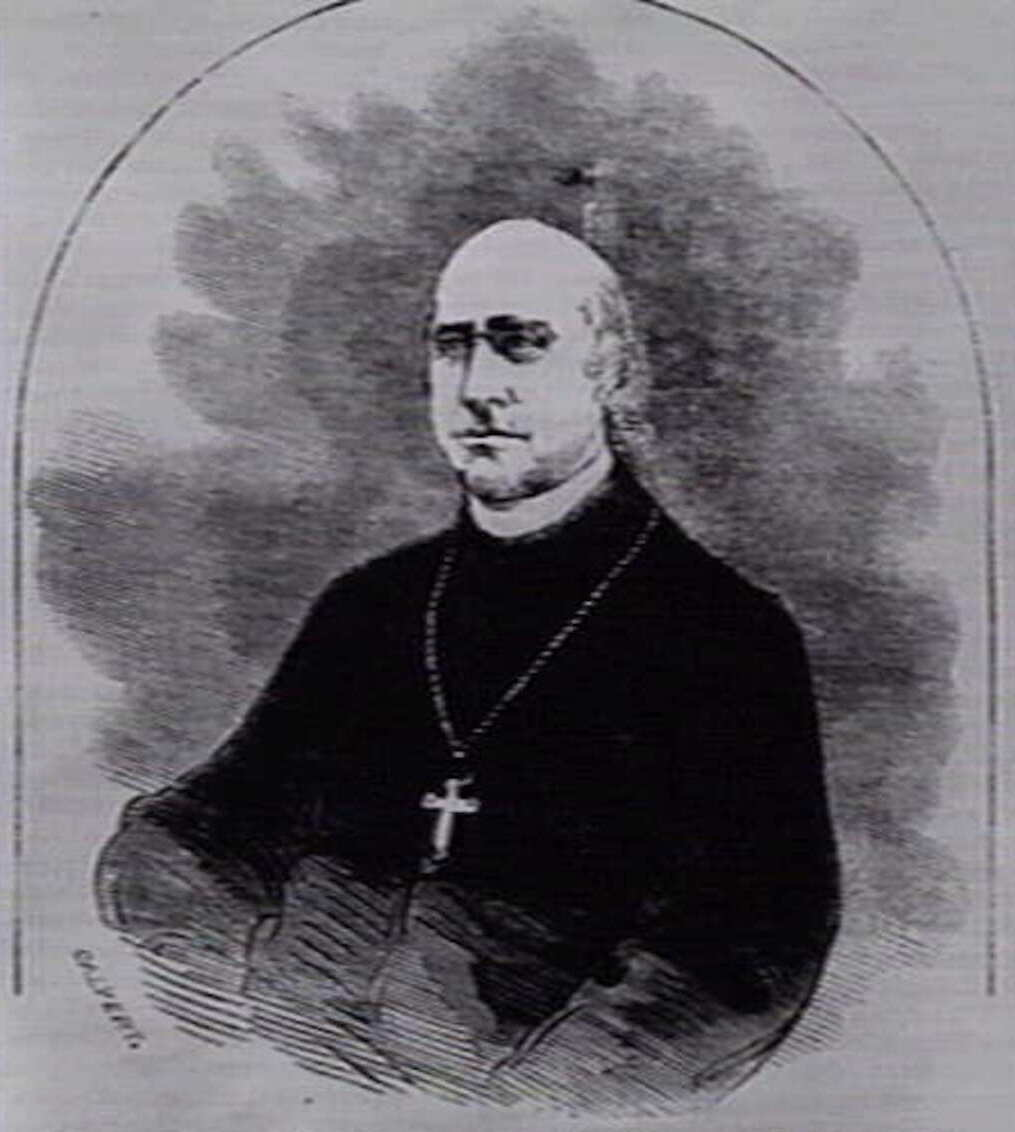
- Diocese: Hobart
- Installed: 22 April 1842
- Term ended: 30 June 1866
- Successor: Daniel Murphy

Orders
- Ordination: 16 December 1824
- Consecration: 28 October 1842

Personal details
- Born: Robert William Willson; 1794 Lincoln, Lincolnshire, England, UK
- Died: 30 June 1866 (aged 71–72) Nottingham, England, UK
- Denomination: Roman Catholic
- Education: St Mary's College, Oscott

Robert William Willson (1794 – 30 June 1866) was an English Roman Catholic bishop and the first Bishop of Hobart. Born in Lincolnshire in 1794, Willson spent 18 years as a priest in Nottingham and became known for his work in prisons and asylums. He was selected as the first Bishop of Hobart in 1842. Following his move to Australia, he became known for his social reform efforts, including his work as a campaigner against convict transportation and his advocacy for improved conditions in insane asylums. He died during a visit to England in 1866.

== Early life ==
Robert Willson was born in Lincoln, Lincolnshire, in 1794. He was the son of a builder named William James Willson and his wife Clarissa (née Tenney). After leaving school, he spent time working on a farm in Nottinghamshire.

== Career ==
In 1816 Willson began studying at the Catholic seminary Oscott College. He was ordained on 16 December 1824 and spent 18 years as a priest in Nottingham, where he spent time working in prisons and asylums. He also oversaw the construction of what would eventually become Nottingham Cathedral.

After the establishment of the Diocese of Hobart, Willson was selected as its first bishop. Willson's popularity in Nottingham led some to protest his selection, and residents of the city appealed to the Pope to prevent his move to Australia. He was consecrated on 28 October 1842 and arrived in Hobart on 11 May 1844. He was installed as bishop the following day in St. Joseph's Church in central Hobart: St. Joseph's served as his cathedral until 1866. Finding that the majority of Tasmania's Catholics were convicts, many of them Irish, Willson became an advocate for reform of the system of convict transportation. He opposed the use of harsh corporal punishment on convicts, and described convict transportation as "a mode of punishment unlawful for a Christian nation knowingly to inflict".

After visiting the remote penal station on Norfolk Island in 1846, Willson returned to London to testify before the House of Lords about the harsh conditions on the island. He told the committee that he regarded transportation as "a terrible mode of punishment". Following another visit to Norfolk Island in 1852, he recruited the Bishop of Maitland, Charles Davis, and the colony's Lieutenant-Governor, William Denison, to join him in petitioning the British government to close the prison on the island. These efforts eventually contributed to the penal station's closure.

Willson also served on the board of the colony's insane asylum and advocated for the establishment of a hospital for the colony. He lobbied the Victorian and New South Wales governments to improve conditions in their asylums. He invited the Sisters of Charity to open a school in Tasmania and worked to expand Catholic education in the colony. In 1860, he began the construction of St Mary's Cathedral in Hobart: the cathedral opened in 1866.

== Later life and death ==
During a return visit to England, Willson died in Nottingham on 30 June 1866 and was buried at the Nottingham Cathedral. In 2005, permission was given for his remains to be exhumed and returned to Australia. His remains were ultimately returned to Tasmania in 2017.
