= Jeremiah Coffey =

Irish-Australian Roman Catholic Bishop

The Most Reverend Jeremiah Coffey
- 7th Roman Catholic Bishop
- Diocese: Sale
- Installed: 8 April 1998
- Term ended: 2 January 2008
- Predecessor: Eric D'Arcy
- Successor: Christopher Prowse

Orders
- Ordination: 22 June 1958 (Priest) in All Hallows College, Ireland
- Consecration: 30 June 1989 (Bishop) in Sale

Personal details
- Born: Jeremiah Joseph Coffey; 1 January 1933 Cork, Ireland
- Died: 19 November 2014
- Denomination: Roman Catholic Church
- Occupation: Roman Catholic bishop
- Profession: Cleric
- Education: University College Dublin; All Hallows College
- Motto: In Joyful Hope

Jeremiah Joseph Coffey (1 January 1933 – 19 November 2014) was the seventh Roman Catholic Bishop of the Diocese of Sale, Australia, serving from 1989 until his retirement in 2008. On retirement, he was styled Bishop Emeritus of Sale.

== Early years ==
Coffey was born in Cork, Ireland. He was educated at Model School, Cork, before attending St Nessan's Christian Brothers' School. He was awarded a Bachelor of Arts degree from University College Dublin and then studied for the priesthood at All Hallows College, choosing to travel to Australia as a missionary and serve in the Diocese of Sale. He was ordained a priest for the Diocese of Sale at All Hallows College on 22 June 1958, by Archbishop James Skinner CIM of St John's, Newfoundland, Canada and arrived in Sale three months later; he served in the parishes of Bairnsdale, Sale, Traralgon, Omeo, Iona and Yallourn prior to being appointed the first parish priest of Churchill. In 1987, Coffey was appointed Rector of Corpus Christi Seminary, Clayton.

== Bishopric ==
On 8 April 1989, Pope John Paul II appointed Coffey as the seventh Bishop of Sale. He was consecrated by Archbishop Sir Frank Little of Melbourne on the grounds of St Patrick's Campus of Sale Catholic College (now Catholic College Sale) on 30 June 1989. The co-consecrators were his predecessor, Archbishop Eric D'Arcy of Hobart together with Bishop David Cremin, who was also a student of All Hallows.

In 2003, Coffey removed Father John Speekman as priest of the parish of Morwell over allegations of bullying. In a long running dispute, Fr Speekman twice successfully appealed to the Congregation for the Clergy against the decree ordering his removal, but Coffey then appealed those decisions to the Apostolic Signatura. In 2011, the Vatican ruled finally in favour of Coffey, ending the eight-year battle where the parish was without a permanent priest.

Under Coffey's leadership of the diocese, the Bishop's Family Foundation was established as a charitable body and has given more than A$500,000 in support of families within the Gippsland diocese. At the time of Coffey's departure, the foundation had a self-generating trust fund of more than A$2 million.

Coffey's retirement as bishop was accepted by Pope Benedict XVI on 2 January 2008. Coffey lived in retirement in Paynesville. He was conferred the title Bishop Emeritus of Sale.

He died on 19 November 2014.

Catholic Church titles
Preceded by Eric D'Arcy	Bishop of Sale; 1989–2008	Succeeded by Christopher Prowse
