= Julian Porteous =

Australian Catholic Archbishop

The Most Reverend Julian Porteous
- Archbishop Emeritus of Hobart
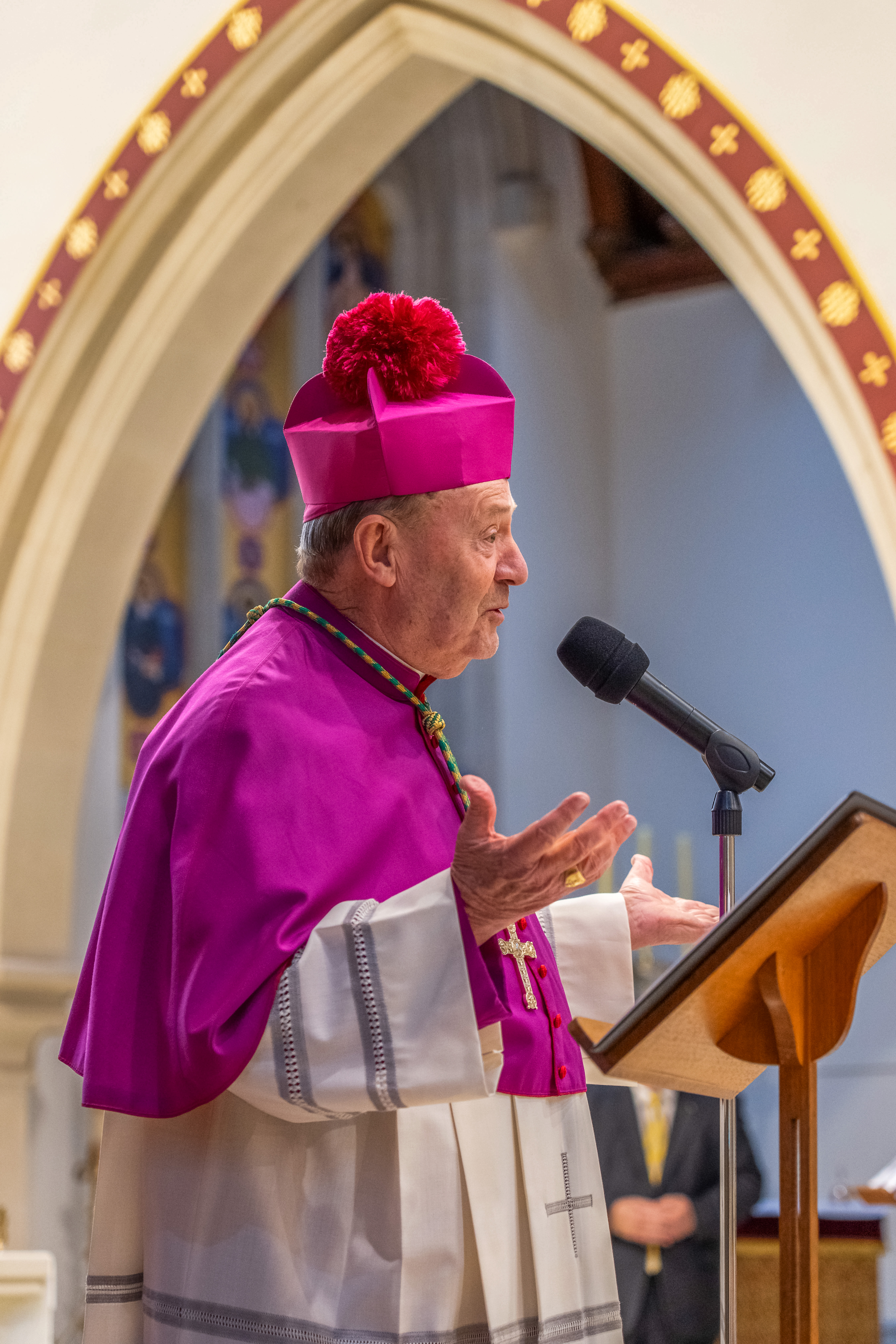
- Porteous in 2024
- Church: Roman Catholic Church
- Archdiocese: Hobart
- See: Hobart
- Appointed: 19 July 2013
- Installed: 17 September 2013
- Term ended: 20 June 2025
- Predecessor: Adrian Leo Doyle
- Successor: Anthony Ireland
- Previous posts: Titular Bishop of Urusi (2003–2013); Auxiliary Bishop of Sydney (2003–2013)

Orders
- Ordination: 7 September 1974 by James Darcy Freeman
- Consecration: 3 September 2003 by George Pell

Personal details
- Born: Julian Charles Porteous; 5 June 1949 (age 77) Sydney, New South Wales, Australia
- Denomination: Roman Catholic
- Coat of arms: Julian Porteous's coat of arms

Styles of Julian Porteous
- Reference style: The Most Reverend
- Spoken style: Your Grace
- Religious style: Archbishop

Ordination history of Julian Porteous
History
Priestly ordination
- Ordained by: James Darcy Freeman
Episcopal consecration
- Principal consecrator: George Pell
- Co-consecrators: Edward Bede Clancy, Bernard Cyril O'Grady

Julian Charles Porteous (born 5 June 1949) is a retired Australian prelate of the Catholic Church. He was previously the Catholic Archbishop of Hobart, Tasmania until his resignation on 20 June 2025. He was previously Auxiliary Bishop of Sydney, Australia, Episcopal Vicar for Renewal and Evangelisation, and Titular Bishop of Urusi (2003–2013).

== Early life ==
Porteous was born at St Margaret's Private Hospital in Sydney on 5 June 1949, the eldest of five children born to Captain John Adam Gordon and Mavis Pamela Porteous. He was baptised in Rose Bay.

His father worked for the Australian Defence Force and the family moved around regularly during his early years. He received his primary education in Melbourne, before the family moved to Singapore after his father was sent there in 1955 due to the Malayan Emergency. He returned in 1958. He completed his primary schooling in Parramatta, before undertaking his secondary education with the De La Salle Brothers at Oakhill College in Castle Hill.

Immediately after completing high school, Porteous entered the seminary to study for the priesthood. He studied first at St Columba's College, Springwood before moving to St Patrick's Seminary, Manly.

== Priesthood ==
Porteous was ordained a priest for the Archdiocese of Sydney on 7 September 1974 at St Mary's Cathedral, Sydney by Cardinal James Darcy Freeman.

His first appointment was as an assistant priest in Kingsgrove. He would also serve as an assistant at Manly, The Entrance, Woy Woy and Mona Vale. In 1996, he was appointed administrator of the Parish of Annandale and in 1999 he was appointed parish priest of Dulwich Hill. As a priest, he organised a number of evangelsiation activities, including public evangelisation rallies at Manly Oval and Belmore Sports Ground, and the Pastoral Training School (now known as the Summer School of Evangelisation).

During his priesthood, he also served as an exorcist, and wrote a field guide for other priests on the subject.

In January 2002, he was appointed Rector of the Seminary of the Good Shepherd in Sydney. The seminary quickly began to see an increase in the number of young men entering, which Porteous believed was based on orthodoxy and fidelity to the Church. By 2005, the number of seminarians had grown to 42, the largest number in many years. By 2006, this had risen to 44.

== Episcopate ==
On 16 July 2003, Porteous was appointed Auxiliary Bishop of Sydney and Titular Bishop of Urusi by Pope John Paul II. He was consecrated a bishop on 3 September 2003 at St Mary's Cathedral, Sydney by Archbishop George Pell. He continued to serve as rector of the Seminary of the Good Shepherd until 2008.

He was consecrated alongside Anthony Fisher OP, who would go on to be the Archbishop of Sydney. At the time, both men were noted for their strong orthodoxy, academic qualifications, practical experiences and personal qualities, and their readiness to courageously and publicly defend Catholic teachings. Their appointment received some criticism from the media and from other senior figures in the Church, including Pat Power.

As Auxiliary Bishop, he continued the work he had done as a priest. He established an Office for Evangelisation, which organised an annual procession of the Blessed Sacrament through the streets of Sydney.

On 19 July 2013, Porteous was appointed Archbishop of Hobart, following the retirement of Archbishop Adrian Leo Doyle.He was installed as Archbishop of Hobart on 17 September 2013.

While he had never resided in Tasmania, his family enjoyed a strong connection to the area. His forebears arrived in Tasmania from England in 1853 and his great grandfather and great grandmother were both born in Hobart, within one kilometre of St Mary’s Cathedral.

One of his first priorities was to increase the number of priests and vocations within the Archdiocese. In 2014, the Archdiocese had five men in formation for the priesthood.

In 2015 Porteous distributed a booklet to 12,000 families with children in Catholic schools across Tasmania entitled "Don’t Mess With Marriage" - the Catholic position on marriage. The booklet argued of gay men and women that "pretending that their relationships are ‘marriages’ is not fair or just to them." There were calls by activists for others to refer the Archbishop to the Australian Anti-Discrimination Commissioner. Following 6 months of deliberations, the complaint was withdrawn without a finding.

It has been reported that, "The real problem with the Porteous case was that it was unresolved".

In 2022 Porteous was accused of promoting climate change skepticism in a church publication titled "Exposing the 'modern green religion'", platforming the views of mining-industry affiliated geologist Professor Ian Plimer. He attracted further accusations of discrimination in 2024 after publishing a public letter titled "We are Salt to the Earth", in which he denounced the "woke" movement and "radicalised transgender lobby".

During his episcopate, Porteous also increased the presence of the Traditional Latin Mass within the Archdiocese. In 2017, he invited Dom Pius Mary Noonan OSB, a professed American monk of Abbaye St Joseph de Clairval, in Flavigny-Sur-Ozerain, France, to begin an Australian foundation in the Diocese. The Notre Dame Priory was founded on 22 February 2017 and has received strong financial support from the Archdiocese. In 2025, he invited the Institute of the Good Shepherd to minister to the Latin Mass Community in Launceston, Tasmania and establish a house.

== Retirement ==
On 5 June 2024, Porteous tendered his resignation as Archbishop of Hobart, having reached the canonical retirement age of 75. While the resignation was accepted, it would not take effect until a replacement was appointed.

He officially retired on 20 June 2025, when Anthony John Ireland was announced as his replacement.

In his retirement, Porteous chose to reside in Tasmania, rather than return to his native Sydney.

== See also ==
- Roman Catholic Archdiocese of Hobart#Controversy

Religious titles
Preceded by Adrian Doyle	Archbishop of Hobart; 2013 – 2025	Succeeded by Anthony John Ireland
