= Daniel Murphy (bishop) =

Irish Roman Catholic bishop

Archbishop Daniel Murphy, RCM Coadjutor Vicar Apostolic – in – Madras-Mylapore (India) (1845–1851) Vicar Apostolic – in – Hyderabad (India) (1851–1865) Coadjutor/Bishop/Archbishop – in – Hobart (Australia) (1865–1907)
- The Most Reverend
- Church: Roman Catholic church
- Diocese: Madras-Mylapore (India); Hyderabad (India); Hobart (Australia)
- In office: 16 December 1845 to 19 May 1851 (in Madras-Mylapore); 20 May 1851 to 13 November 1865 (in Hyderabad); 14 November 1865 to 29 December 1907 (in Hobart)
- Predecessor: P. J. Carew, RCM (in Madras-Mylapore); Position created (in Hyderabad); R. W. Willson, RCM (in Hobart)
- Successor: Position discontinued (in Madras-Mylapore); J. D. Barbero, PIME (in Hyderabad); Patrick Delany (in Hobart)

Orders
- Ordination: 8 February 1838 by Daniel Murray, RCM (Principal Consecrator); John Ryan, RCM and Cornelius Egan, RCM (Principal Co-consecrators)
- Consecration: 11 October 1846 by John Murphy, RCM
- Rank: Archbishop

Personal details
- Born: 15 June 1815 Crookstown, County Cork (Ireland)
- Died: 29 December 1907 (aged 92) Low Head, Tasmania (Australia)
- Buried: Hobart (Australia)
- Denomination: Christianity
- Education: B. Th.
- Alma mater: St Patrick's College, Maynooth (Ireland)

Daniel Murphy (15 June 1815 – 29 December 1907) was a Roman Catholic Archbishop of Hobart, Tasmania.

== Life and career ==
Murphy was born in Belmont, County Cork, Ireland, the son of Michael Murphy and his wife Mary, née McSweeney.

Murphy was educated at St Patrick's College, Maynooth, where he was ordained priest in 1838, and at once volunteered for the foreign missions in India, proceeding with Bishop Carew to Madras in 1845. Subsequently, he was appointed coadjutor to Bishop Fennelly, successor to Archbishop Carew, translated to Calcutta, and was consecrated by John Murphy, Bishop of Cork, in October 1846, in the parish church of Kinsale. In 1848, Daniel Murphy was appointed bishop to the newly erected Vicariate Apostolic of Hyderabad, Deccan, India. During the Indian Mutiny of 1857 he manifested great prudence, and secured from the Nizam several stands of arms for the boys of the Catholic College, who were drilled in expectation of a mutiny arising in the State.

In consequence of ill health, Pope Pius IX transferred him from India to Tasmania in 1865, appointing him Bishop of Hobart in succession to Robert Willson. Murphy arrived in Hobart in April 1866. He attended the First Vatican Council in 1869, and paid another visit to Rome from Hobart in 1882. In 1888, on the occasion of the golden jubilee of his priesthood, Hobart was erected into an archbishopric, and he became the first Metropolitan. Cardinal Patrick Francis Moran invested him with the pallium on 12 May 1889, and Murphy gave Moran an antique parchment scroll of the Book of Esther that he had purchased during a visit to the Holy Land. The scroll is currently held by the Veech Library at the Catholic Institute of Sydney.

Murphy was also an astronomer, submitting a paper on solar phenomena and their effects to the Australasian Science Association Congress in Hobart in 1892. Murphy died in Low Head, Tasmania, Australia, on 29 December 1907 and was buried in Hobart.

Catholic Church titles
| Preceded by P. J. Carew, RCM | Roman Catholic Archdiocese of Madras and Mylapore; Coadjutor Vicar Apostolic – in – Madras-Mylapore; 1845–1851 | Succeeded by Position discontinued |
| Preceded by Position created | Roman Catholic Archdiocese of Hyderabad; Vicar Apostolic – in – Hyderabad; 1851–1865 | Succeeded by J. D. Barbero, PIME |
| Preceded by R. W. Willson, RCM | Roman Catholic Archdiocese of Hobart; Bishop – in – Hobart; 1865–1907 | Succeeded by Patrick Delany, RCM |
