= Eric D'Arcy =

Australian Catholic bishop

The Most Reverend Eric D'Arcy
- 9th Catholic Archbishop
- Diocese: Hobart
- Installed: 24 October 1988
- Term ended: 26 July 1999
- Predecessor: Guilford Clyde Young
- Successor: Adrian Leo Doyle
- Other post: Bishop of Sale (1981–1988)

Orders
- Ordination: 24 July 1949 (priest) in Melbourne
- Consecration: 1 July 1981 (bishop)

Personal details
- Born: Joseph Eric D'Arcy; 25 April 1924 Melbourne, Victoria, Australia
- Died: 12 December 2005 (aged 81) Melbourne
- Denomination: Roman Catholic Church
- Occupation: Catholic bishop
- Profession: Cleric
- Education: Corpus Christi College, Melbourne; University of Melbourne (BA Hons, MA); University of Oxford (DPhil); Pontifical Gregorian University (PhD)

Joseph Eric D'Arcy (25 April 1924 – 12 December 2005) was the ninth Archbishop of the Catholic Archdiocese of Hobart, Tasmania, Australia, from 1988 to 1999. Immediately prior to his appointment to Hobart, D'Arcy served as the sixth Bishop of the Diocese of Sale from 1981 to 1988.

== Early life and education ==
Joseph Eric D'Arcy was born in the Melbourne suburb of Brighton on 25 April 1924.

He was educated at Our Lady of Lourdes Parish School, Armadale; De La Salle College, Malvern; Corpus Christi College, Werribee; and the University of Melbourne, where he graduated with a Bachelor of Arts degree with First Class Honours and an Exhibition in Philosophy, and a Master of Arts in Philosophy.

He later pursued doctoral studies in philosophy at the University of Oxford, where he was the first Australian-born philosopher to receive an Oxford doctorate, and the Pontifical Gregorian University in Rome.

== Career ==
D'Arcy was ordained as a priest in 1949, and also taught in the philosophy department at University of Melbourne, eventually becoming its head.

He garnered unwanted notoriety in 1955, when a letter undersigned by him was leaked to the press confirming the existence of 'The Movement' (modelled on Catholic Action groups in Europe) within the Australian Labor Party. The resulting furore contributed to the Labor Split.

D'Arcy served as the sixth Bishop of the Diocese of Sale from 1981 to 1988, becoming the ninth Archbishop of the Archdiocese of Hobart from 1988 to 1999.

== Later life and death ==
D'Arcy was Archbishop Emeritus of Hobart from his retirement in 1999 until his death in Melbourne on 12 December 2005, aged 81.

== Publications and other activities ==
D'Arcy was the author of Conscience and its Right to Freedom (Sheed and Ward, 1961) and Human Acts: an essay in their moral evaluation (Clarendon Press, 1963). He also participated as translator and commentator on the 60-volume English version of Thomas Aquinas' Summa. He welcomed the Second Vatican Council's support for the rights of conscience and religious freedom.

D'Arcy was invited to give the inaugural Newman Lecture at Mannix College, Monash University, Melbourne, in 1981.

Catholic Church titles
Preceded by Arthur Fox	6th Bishop of Sale; 1981–1988	Succeeded by Jeremiah Coffey
Preceded by Guilford Clyde Young	9th Archbishop of Hobart; 1988–1999	Succeeded by Adrian Leo Doyle
