= List of monasteries in Australia =

The following is an incomplete list of monastic houses in Australia, with some sections of the list including New Zealand.

== Catholic orders in Australia and New Zealand ==
=== Male religious orders ===
- Tarrawarra Abbey, Victoria, Australia, a Trappist monastery founded from Ireland in 1954. Since 1998 Tarrawarra has had a daughter house in Kerala, India: Kurisumala Ashram.
- Benedictine Abbey, New Norcia, Western Australia
- Monastery of Saint Benedict, Arcadia, New South Wales.
- Southern Star Abbey, New Zealand. Southern Star is a Trappist monastery.
- Blessed Sacrament Fathers in Sydney and Melbourne.
- Notre Dame Priory. A traditional Benedictine monastery established in 2017 in Colebrook, Tasmania.
- Pauline Fathers. Marian Valley, Queensland and Penrose Park, New South Wales.
- Saint Charbel's Monastery, Antonin Maronite Order. Coburg, Victoria
- Saint Charbel's Monastery, Lebanese Maronite Order. Punchbowl, New South Wales
- Saint John the Beloved's Monastery, Lebanese Maronite Missionaries. Mt. Druitt, New South Wales
- St John Paul II Monastery, Maronite Order of the Blessed Virgin Mary. Ryde, New South Wales
- Passionist Monastery, Parkside, South Australia.
- The Fort, Oxley, Queensland, a Passionist Monastery also known as Regina Coeli Retreat and St Mary's Retreat.

=== Female religious orders ===
- Jamberoo Abbey, New South Wales. This community of Benedictine Nuns has had a continuing presence in NSW since 1848.
- Benedictine Monastery of the Transfiguration, Tanby, Yeppoon, Queensland.
- Sisters of the Good Samaritan of the Order of St Benedict
- The Discalced Carmelites have monasteries for women in Sydney, Perth, Melbourne, Adelaide, and Brisbane, and the New Zealand city of Christchurch.
- The Poor Clares have a number of monasteries for women in Sydney. The Order of Saint Clare has monasteries in Waverley and Riverstone: see . A separate congregation of Poor Clares has a monastery in Campbelltown, named Bethlehem Monastery
- Tyburn Nuns, convents located in Riverstone, NSW, Australia and Bombay, New Zealand
- Maronite College of the Holy Family and Convent, Maronite Sisters of the Holy Family. Harris Park NSW
- St Maroun's College and Convent, Maronite Sisters of the Holy Family, in Dulwich Hill, New South Wales
- Maronite Sisters of the Holy Family Nursing Village and Convent, Maronite Sisters of the Holy Family in Dulwich Hill NSW
- Maronite Antonine Sisters College and Convent, Maronite Antonine Sisters in East Coburg VIC
- St Paul's Community, Maronite Antonine Sisters. Thornbury VIC
- Brigidine Southern Cross Community, Brigidine Sisters. Malvern Victoria

A more complete list of Catholic religious orders in Australia can be found here:

See Catholic religious orders for a list of non-monastic and monastic Catholic institutes.

== Anglican orders ==
- Community of Saints Barnabas and Cecilia, Peterborough, South Australia
- Community of the Sisters of the Church
- Community of Christ the King, Taminick, Victoria
- Community of Christ the King
- Community of the Holy Name
- St Mark's Benedictine Abbey, Campbelltown, Victoria
- Society of St Francis of Australia, Hermitage of St Bernardine, Stroud NSW
- Oratory of the Good Shepherd
- Little Brothers of Francis
- Sisters of the Incarnation
- Community of the Sisters of the Church
- Society of the Sacred Advent
- Society of the Sacred Mission
- Order of Saint Benedict, Camperdown

== Eastern Orthodox ==
=== Antiochian Orthodox Archdiocese of Australia and New Zealand ===
- Monastery of St Anna, Preston, Victoria. Female monastery under the care of Abbess Riasophor Theodora.

=== Greek Orthodox Archdiocese of Australia ===
- Monastery of St George, Winmalee, NSW. Male monastery under Archimandrite Kyriakos.
- Monastery of Panayia Gorgoepikoos, Geelong, Victoria. Female monastery under the care of Abbess Mother Kallistheni.
- Monastery of the Holy Cross, Mangrove, NSW. Female monastery under the care of Abbess Mother Philothei.
- Monastery of St John of the Mountain, Forrestfield, Western Australia under Hieromonk Evagrios.
- Monastery of Pantanassa, Lower Mangrove Creek, NSW. Male monastery under the care of Archimandrite Stephanos (Pantanassiotis).

=== Macedonian Orthodox Diocese of Australia and New Zealand ===
- Monastery of Saint Petka, Kembla Grange, New South Wales. Female monastery.
- Monastery of Saint Prohor of Pčinja, Donnybrook, Victoria. Female monastery.
- Monastery of Saint Naum of Ohrid, Rocklyn, Victoria. Female monastery.
- Monastery of Saint Kliment of Ohrid, Kinglake West, Victoria. Male monastery.

=== Russian Orthodox Church - Australian and New Zealand Diocese ===
- Monastery of Prophet Elias, Monarto, South Australia. Male monastery under the care of Abbot Hieromonk Benjamin.
- Monastery of Our Lady of Kazan, Kentlyn, New South Wales. Female monastery under the care of Abbess Nun Maria (administrator).
- Monastery of Archangel Michael, Marrickville, NSW. Male monastery under the care of Abbot Igumen Kosmas (Vasilopoulos).
- Saint Petroc Monastery, Cascades, Tasmania. Male monastery of the Western Rite under the care of Abbot Hieromonk Michael (Mansbridge-Wood).
- Monastery of the Presentation of the Mother of God, Bungarby, New South Wales. Female monastery under the care of Abbess Mother Anna (Karipoff)
- Monastery of Holy Transfiguration, Bombala, NSW. Male monastery under the care of Abbot Archimandrite Alexis (Rosentool)
- Monastery of the Holy Trinity, Monkerai, NSW. Male monastery under the care of Abbot Hieromonk John (Macpherson).
- St. John the Baptist Skete, Kentlyn, NSW. Male skete under the care of Abbot Hieromonk Joachim (Ross)

=== Serbian Orthodox Church in Australia and New Zealand ===
- Monastery of St Sava (New Kalenic), Hall, Australian Capital Territory
- Monastery of St Sava, Elaine, Victoria. Male monastery under the care of Abbot Iguman Teodor (Bojovic).
- Skete of the Nativity of the Theotokos, Inglewood, South Australia. Female skete under the care of Abbess Igumanija Anastasija
