= Church of the Apostles, Launceston =

Church of the Apostles
- Church of the Twelve Apostles
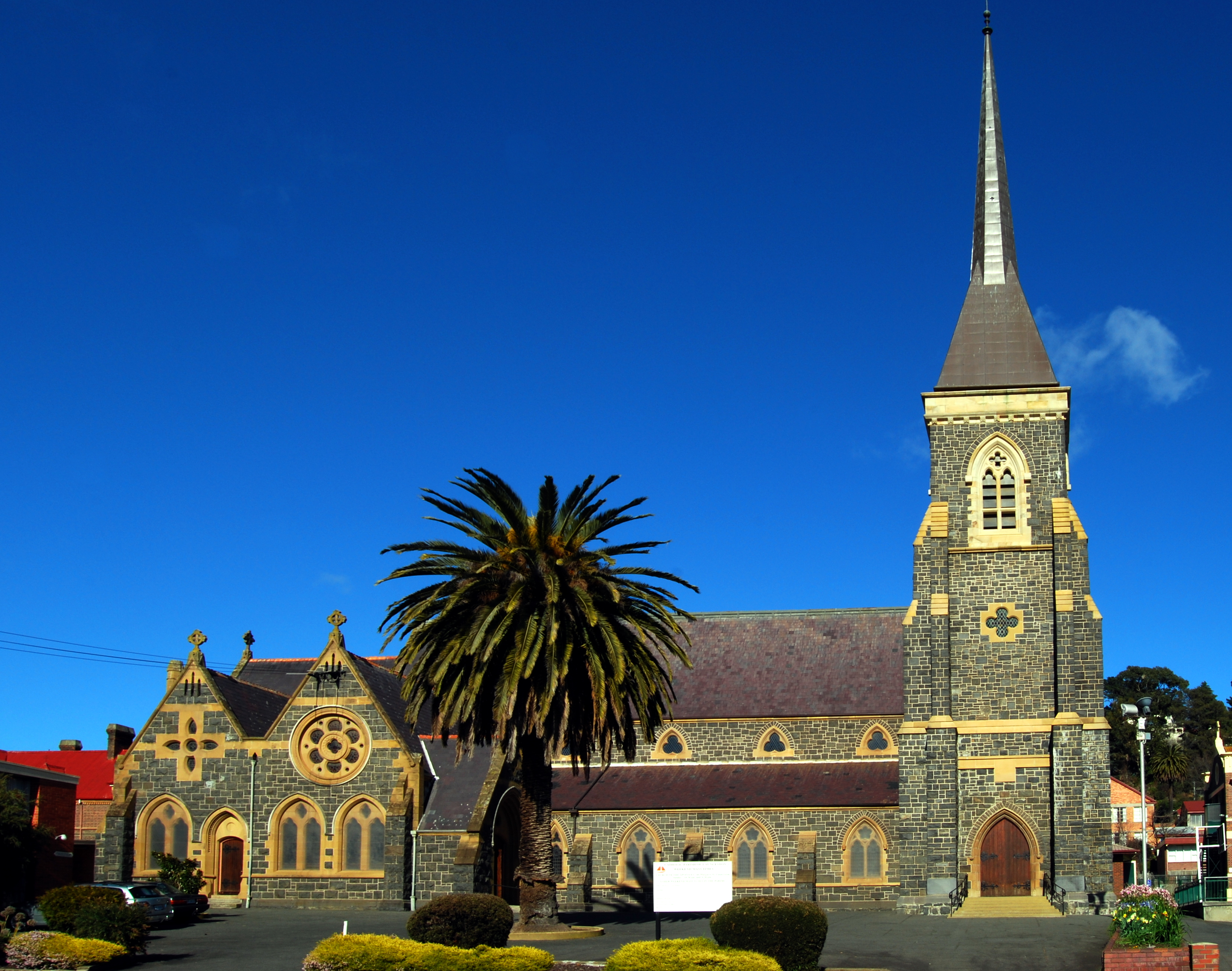

- 41°26′33.9″S 147°8′1.7″E
- Location: 44 Margaret Street, Launceston, Tasmania
- Country: Australia
- Denomination: Catholic

History
- Status: Parish church
- Dedication: Mary, Queen of the Apostles
- Consecrated: 7 November 1866

Architecture
- Architect(s): Henry Hunter, Alexander North, Peter Staunton
- Style: Gothic Revival
- Years built: 1866 (nave and aisles); 1888 (transept, sanctuary & sacristies); 1989 (bell tower & spire)
- Groundbreaking: 15 September 1864

Administration
- Archdiocese: Archdiocese of Hobart
- Parish: Launceston Parish

The Church of the Apostles is a Catholic church in Launceston, Tasmania, belonging to the Archdiocese of Hobart.

== History ==
=== Earlier churches ===
In 1838 a temporary chapel had been erected in Cameron Street for the local Catholic community, which up to that moment had no fixed place of worship in the city. In the same year the government granted the Catholics a site in Margaret Street, "at the foot of the Cataract Hill", for the construction of a permanent building, a chapel dedicated to Saint Joseph.

The foundation stone for the St Joseph's church was laid on 19 March 1839 by Rev. Gentleman, and the church was inaugurated in October 1842. Two decades later, St. Joseph's Church began to show signs of decay, and it was decided to replace it with a larger church.

=== Church of the Apostles ===
The plans for the new church were drawn by the Tasmanian architect Henry Hunter, and the foundation stone was laid on 15 September 1864 by Bishop Willson. By October 1866 the nave and two aisles had already been built, and on 7 November the church was solemnly opened for religious purposes by Rev. Murphy, Bishop of Hobart. The church was dedicated to Mary, Queen of the Apostles.

Construction of the North section, encompassing the transept, sanctuary and sacristies, began several years later. Bishop Murphy laid the foundation stone on 17 June 1888. By then, Hunter was living in Brisbane and the task was entrusted to architect Alexander North. A foundation stone for the tower was laid in May 1889, but it wasn't finished until a century later. Designed by Melbourne architect Peter Staunton, the bell tower and spire were installed in 1989.

The church conserves its original stone high altar. The pulpit, made from blackwood and huon pine, was the work of Timothy Earley. The church's pipe organ, in two flanking columns, was dedicated in 1933.

== Gallery ==
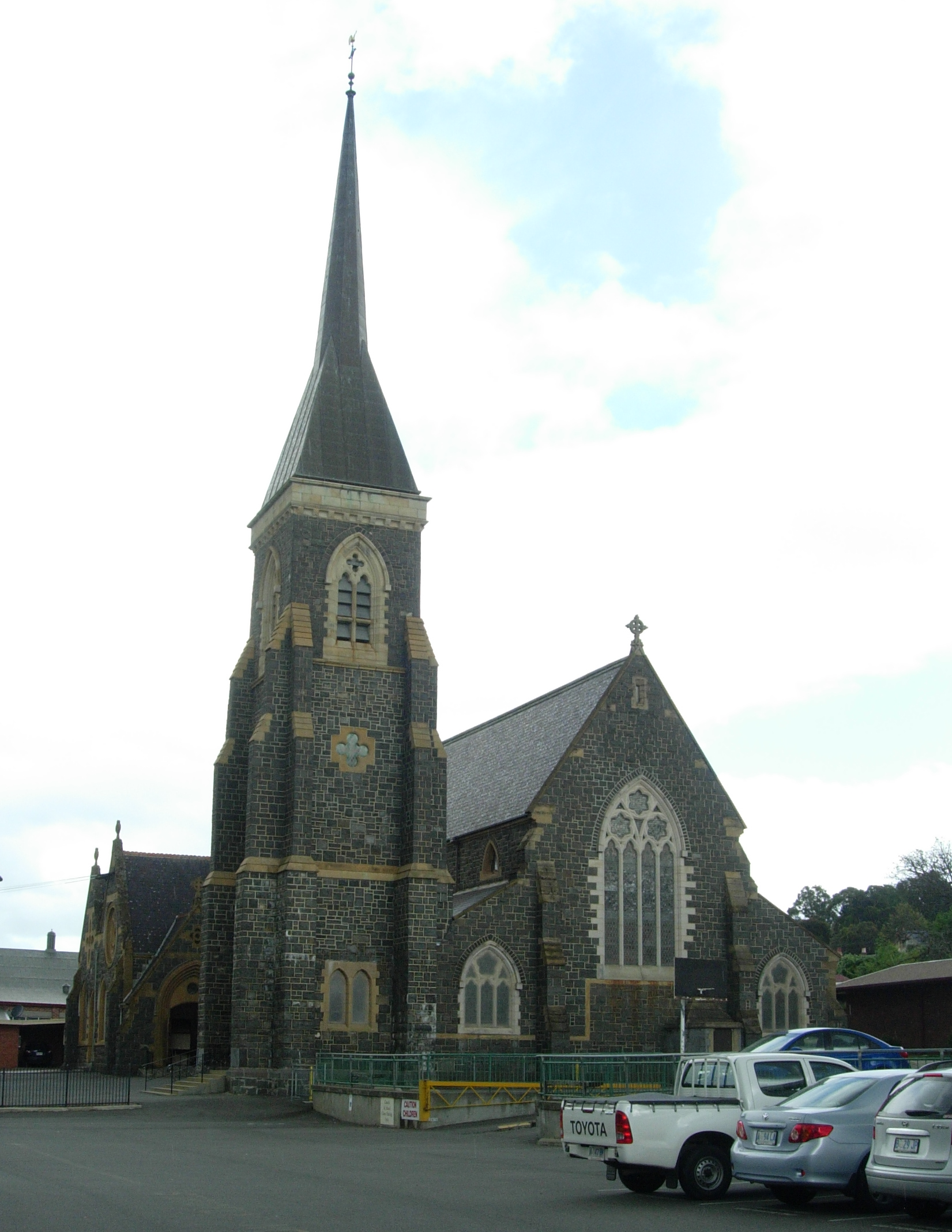
Front view

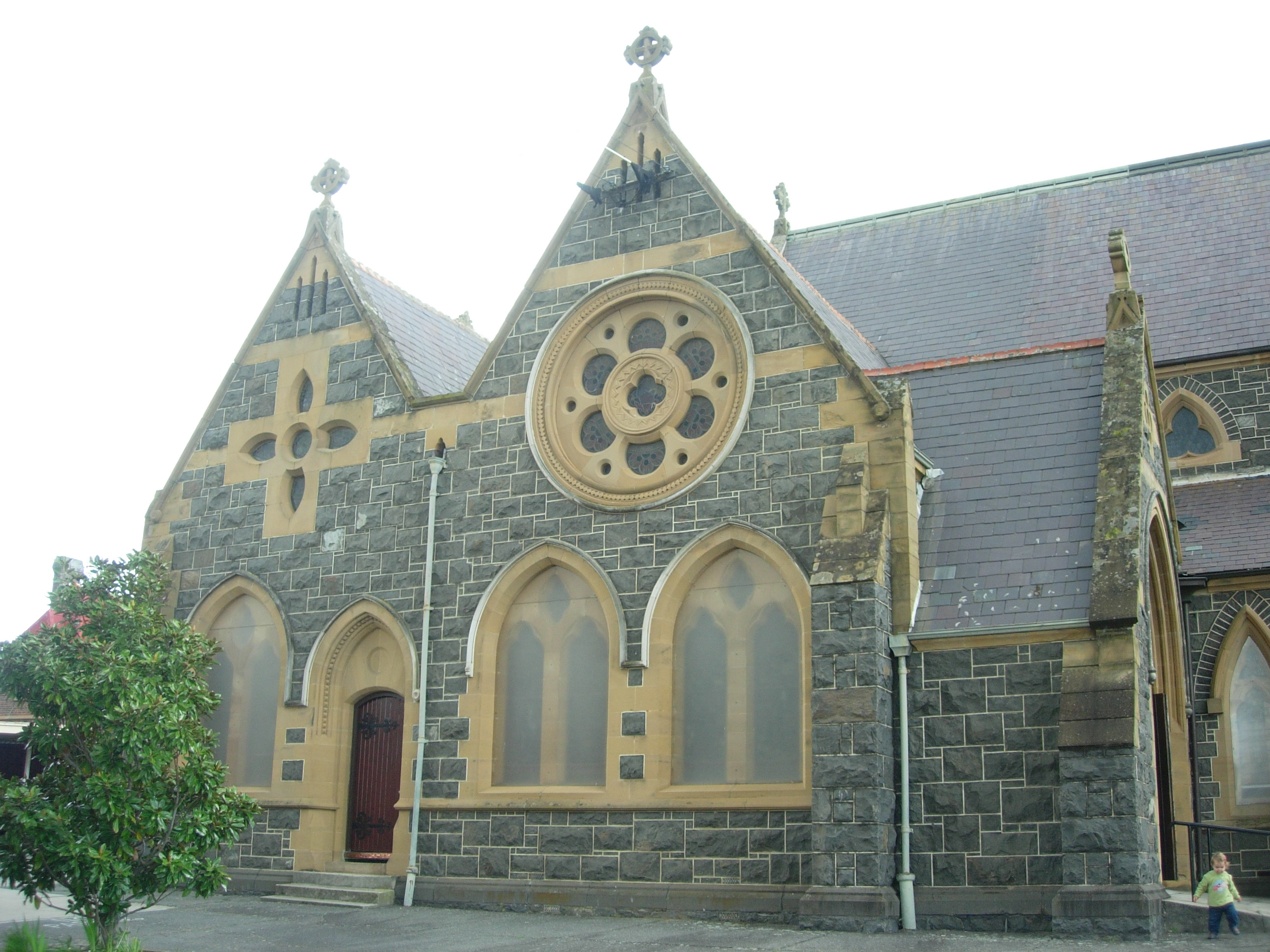
Lateral view

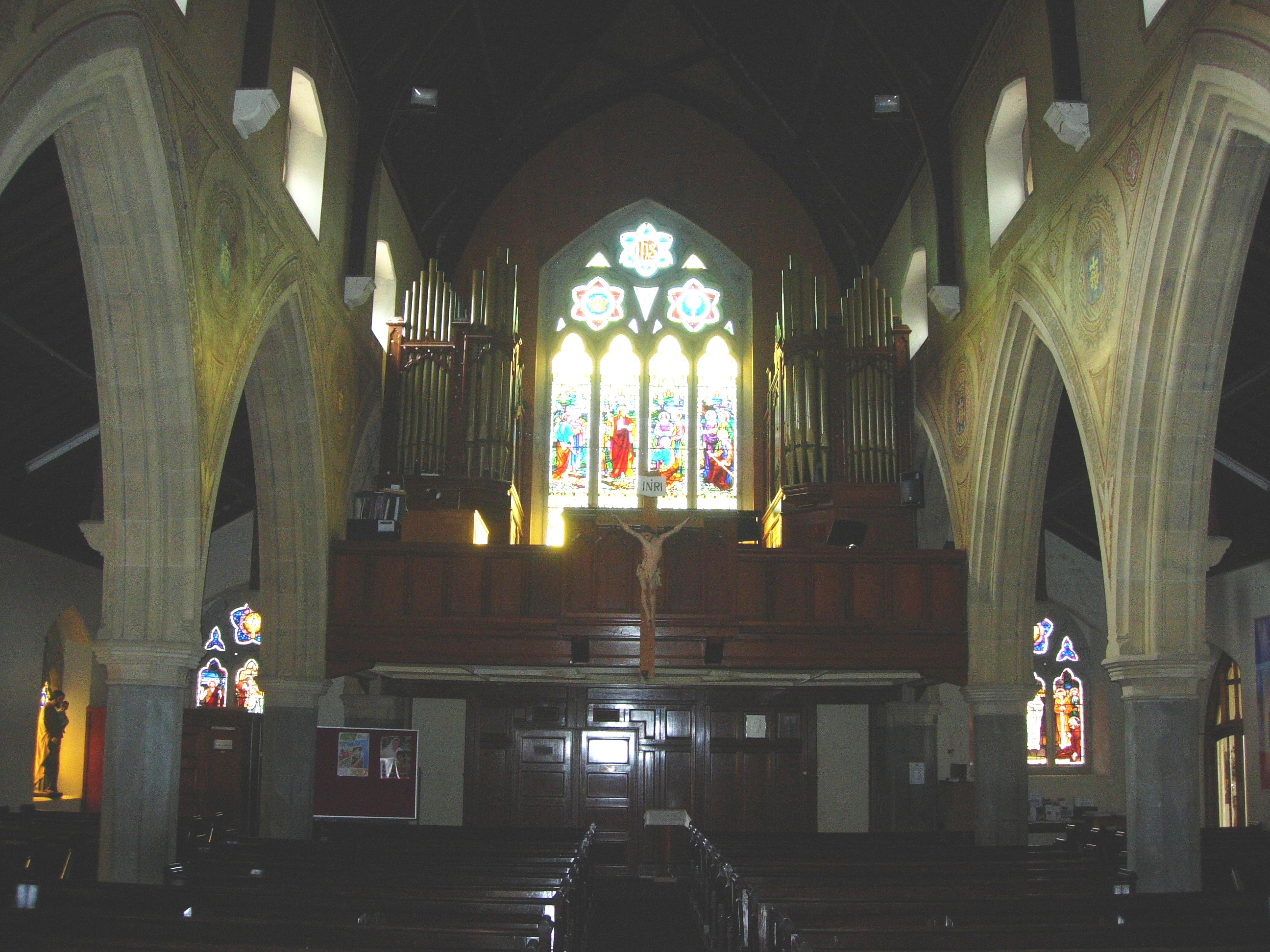
Stained glass windows flanked by the organ pipes

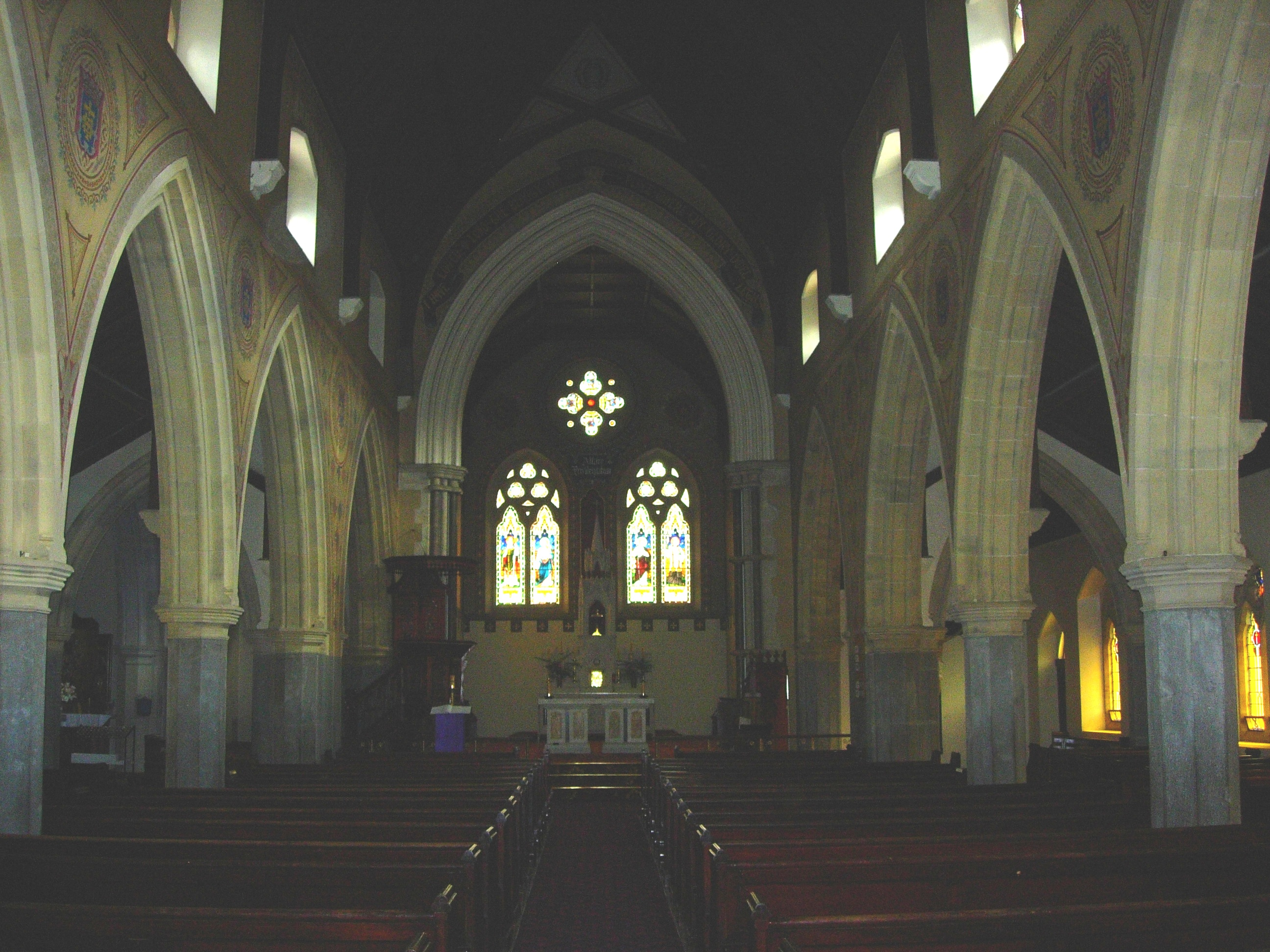
Interior

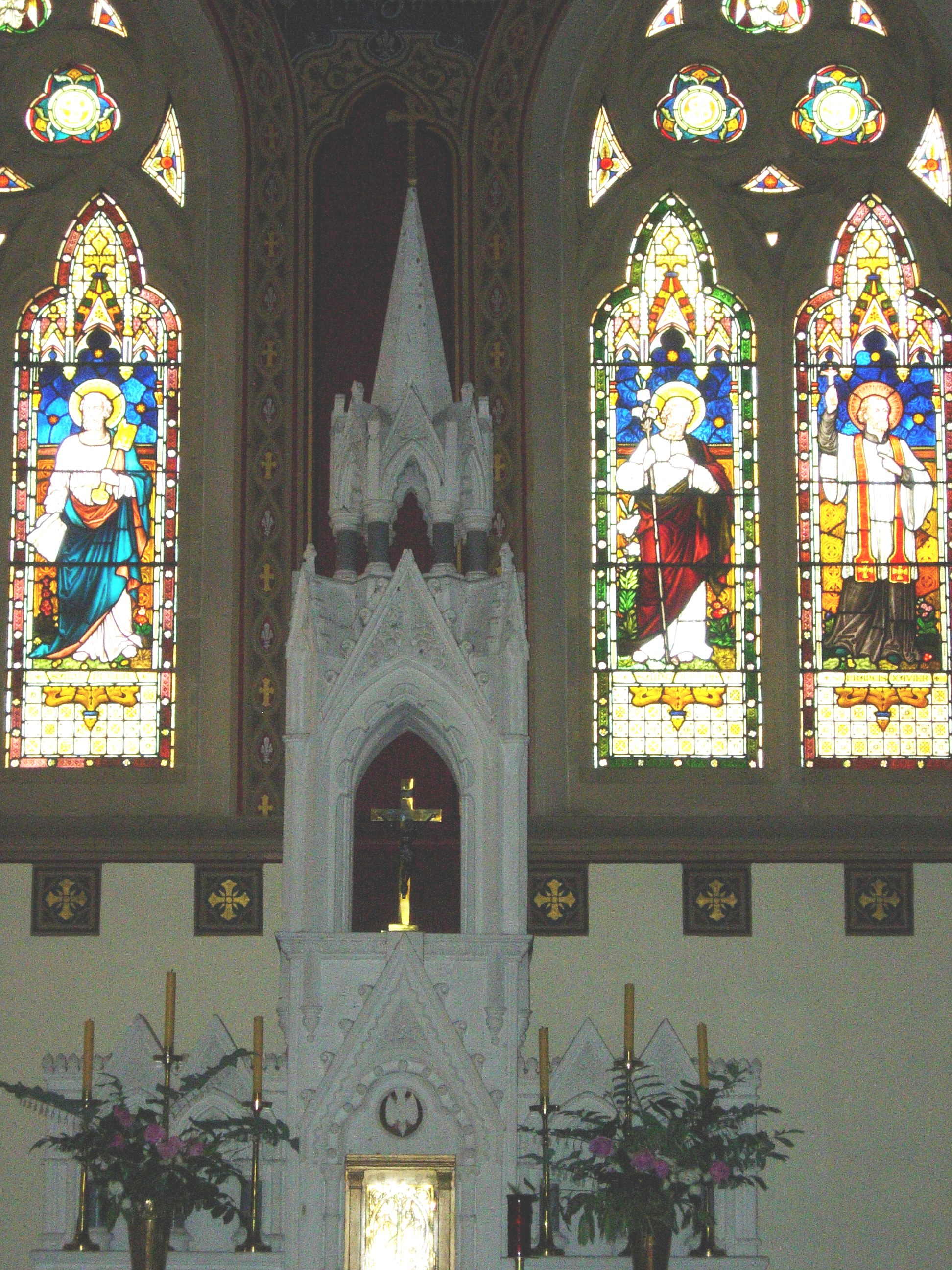
Detail of the high altar
