= Patrick Dunne (priest) =

Irish Roman Catholic priest

Patrick Dunne (1818–1900) was an Irish Roman Catholic priest who ministered in Australia.

He was born in Philipstown, now Daingean, County Offaly. He trained for the priesthood in St. Patrick's, Carlow College, was ordained in 1846 and served for four years in the Diocese of Kildare. In 1850, he went to Australia, serving in the goldfields and many new church and educational developments. He returned to Ireland in 1859 after a dispute with the hierarchy in Melbourne.

In 1859, he founded the short-lived St. Brigid's Seminary in Tullamore which closed in 1866, Dunne intended this to be a minor seminary preparing priests to minister in Australia.

He was vicar general of Goulburn, New South Wales, Australia, and was the founding president of St Patrick's College, Goulburn, in 1874.

Dunne's nephew, John Dunne, was the inaugural Roman Catholic Bishop of Wilcannia.
