= William Hayden (bishop) =

Irish-born Australian Catholic bishop (1867–1936)

The Most Reverend William Hayden
- Archbishop of Archdiocese of Hobart
- Archdiocese: Hobart
- Installed: 11 February 1930
- Term ended: 20 September 1955
- Predecessor: William Barry
- Successor: Justin Simonds
- Other post: Bishop of Wilcannia–Forbes (1918–1930)

Orders
- Ordination: 28 October 1891 at Collegio Teutonico Chapel, Rome by Giulio Lenti
- Consecration: 8 September 1918 at St Mary's Cathedral, Sydney by Michael Kelly

Personal details
- Born: William Hayden; 15 March 1867 Kilkenny, Ireland
- Died: 2 October 1936 (aged 69) Darlinghurst, New South Wales, Australia
- Denomination: Catholic Church
- Occupation: Catholic bishop
- Motto: In omnibus caritas (In all things, charity)

William Hayden (15 March 1867 – 2 October 1936) was an Irish-born Australian bishop of the Catholic Church. He served as Archbishop of Hobart and prior to that, Bishop of Wilcannia–Forbes.

== Early life ==
Hayden was born in Bishop's Lough, Co. Kilkenny, Ireland to Charles and Bridget Hayden. His brother Thomas also became a priest for the Archdiocese of Sydney and was elevated to the rank of monsignor. His sister, Mother Mary Stanislaus Hayden, become a Brigidine sister and served in Randwick. She was part of the first group of Brigidine Sisters to travel to Coonamble in 1883.

Hayden began his preliminary studies for the priesthood at St Kieran's College, Kilkenny before furthering his studies at the Pontificio Collegio Urbano de Propaganda Fide in Rome.

== Priesthood ==
Hayden was ordained to the priesthood on 28 October 1891 in the Pontificio Collegio Urbano de Propaganda Fide Chapel in Rome by Bishop Giulio Lenti. He travelled to Australia following his ordination and received his first appointment at Concord. He then served at St Mary's Cathedral, Sydney before being appointed parish priest of Albion Park. During his 13 years at Albion Park, he built a convent, school and chapel in Dapto. He also enlarged the church at Shellharbour.He was then transferred to Dulwich Hill, where he built a convent, school and presbytery, while also acquiring new land for the parish. He also founded The Catholic Press newspaper in 1895.

== Episcopate ==
On 13 March 1918, he was appointed Bishop of the newly named and expanded Diocese of Wilcannia–Forbes. He was consecrated as a bishop on 8 September 1918 at St Mary's Cathedral, Sydney by Archbishop Michael Kelly.

He proceeded to his new diocese and arrived in Broken Hill on 20 October 1918.

He quickly developed a sympathetic understanding of the problems and needs of the vast diocese, voicing the grievances and demands of the people of far west New South Wales. He was an ardent champion of the railway from Broken Hill to Sydney. While in the Diocese, he helped the Marist Brothers open five schools in Forbes and Broken Hill. He established new parishes in Carinda and Barham. He built a new convent in Mathoura and established a convent and novitiate in Parkes for the Sisters of Mercy.

=== Archbishop of Hobart ===
On 11 February 1930, Hayden was appointed Archbishop of Hobart, succeeding Archbishop William Barry. He arrived in the Diocese in May 1930.

The reputation for travelling far and wide across his diocese in Wilcannia-Forbes was matched in Hobart. He spent time visiting parishes across Tasmania. In 1931, he travelled to Rome and Ireland, and in 1934 attended the National Eucharistic Congress in Melbourne, presiding at one of the major masses. He began to experience ill-health however and this forced him to slow his travels during the mid-1930s.

== Death ==
Hayden died on 2 October 1936 at St Vincent's Hospital in Darlinghurst following an illness which had lasted several months. He had left Tasmania in June to receive treatment. His remains were taken to Hobart following his death.

Catholic Church titles
Preceded by William Barry	Archishop of Hobart; 1930–1936	Succeeded by Justin Daniel Simonds
Preceded by John Dunne	Bishop of Wilcannia-Forbes; 1918–1930	Succeeded by Thomas Martin Fox
