= William Barry (bishop) =

Irish-born Roman Catholic priest

- Archbishop of Hobart
- Church: Catholic Church
- Archdiocese: Archdiocese of Hobart
- In office: 7 May 1926 – 13 June 1929
- Predecessor: Patrick Delany
- Successor: William Hayden
- Previous posts: Titular Archbishop of Pessinus (1919-1926); Coadjutor Archbishop of Hobart (1919-1926)

Orders
- Ordination: 24 June 1898 by James Moore
- Consecration: 31 August 1919 by Michael Kelly

Personal details
- Born: 1 January 1872 Midleton, County Cork, United Kingdom of Great Britain and Ireland
- Died: 13 June 1929 (aged 57)

William Barry (1 January 1872 – 13 June 1929) was an Irish-born Roman Catholic priest who served as Archbishop of Hobart, Tasmania.

== Life and ministry ==
Born in 1872, in Midleton, Co. Cork, he was educated locally by the Christian Brothers and at St Colman's College, Fermoy. In 1892 he entered All Hallows College, Dublin, to train as a missionary priest. He was ordained in 1898 and posted to the Archdiocese of Sydney, by Cardinal Moran, where he worked at St. Mary's Cathedral.

In 1919 he was appointed co-adjutor bishop of Hobart. Dr. Barry succeeded Archbishop Delany in 1926, to the see of Hobart.

He died on 13 June 1929; he was succeeded by Kilkenny-born and Rome-educated William Hayden.

Archbishop Barry was one of four brothers who became priests, including his brother Rt. Rev. John Barry was also priest and bishop who served in Australia. When appointed to Hobart in 1919, William Barry was succeeded by his brother Tom Barry as parish priest.

Catholic Church titles
Preceded by Patrick Delany	4th Archbishop of Hobart; 1926–1929	Succeeded by William Hayden
