= John Dunne (bishop of Wilcannia) =

Irish Roman Catholic bishop

The Right Reverend John Dunne DD
- 1st Roman Catholic Bishop
- Diocese: Diocese of Wilcannia
- Installed: 13 May 1887
- Term ended: 25 December 1916
- Predecessor: new see
- Successor: William Hayden

Orders
- Ordination: 31 October 1870 (Priest) in Carlow, Ireland
- Consecration: 14 August 1887 (Bishop) in Goulburn, New South Wales

Personal details
- Born: John Dunne; 21 January 1846 Rhode, King's County, Ireland
- Died: 25 December 1916 (aged 70) Wilcannia, New South Wales, Australia
- Denomination: Roman Catholic Church
- Occupation: Roman Catholic bishop
- Profession: Bishop
- Education: Carlow College

John Dunne (21 January 1846 – 25 December 1916) was a Roman Catholic bishop. He was the first bishop of the Diocese of Wilcannia in New South Wales, Australia.

== Early life ==
Dunne was born in Rhode, King's County, Ireland. He studied for the priesthood at Carlow College and received a Bachelor of Arts from University of Dublin.

== Priesthood ==
Dunne was ordained a priest for the Archdiocese of Sydney on 31 October 1870 by Bishop James Walshe in Ireland. He arrived in Sydney in February 1871. He assisted at St Mary's Cathedral, Sydney.

His relative John Dunne, then Vicar-General of Goulburn, requested that Dunne be devoted to the Diocese of Goulburn. The request was granted by Archdeacon John Polding and the newly promoted priest worked for 16 years in Goulburn.

Dunne's uncle, Patrick Dunne, was an Irish-born priest who also ministered in Australia.

His first appointment in his new diocese was as assistant priest in Wagga Wagga, where he served for 12 months. He was then given charge of the Boorowa Mission where he remained for several years. In 1880, he was transferred to Albury. While in Albury, he took charge of the affairs of the diocese during the absence of the bishop on a European trip, displaying a strong organisational and administrative ability.

As a priest, Dunne was a devoted builder. In Boorowa, he erected a bluestone, cruciform church. He also built churches in Murringo and Hovell's Creek. In Murrumburrah, he paid off the heavy debt which was burdening the parish. In Albury, he helped to erect the convent, Catholic hall and orphanage.

== Episcopacy ==
In 1885, the Bishops of Australasia assembled in Synod and petitioned the Holy See for the erection of a diocese in the far west of New South Wales. The petition was granted and on 10 May 1887, the Diocese of Wilcannia was erected. On 13 May 1887, Dunne was appointed its first bishop.

Dunne was consecrated the first Bishop of Wilcannia on 14 August 1887 at Goulburn Cathedral, a position he retained until his death.

As Bishop of Wilcannia, he continued to be a builder in the same fashion he had been as a priest. When he was appointed, there was no residence for the Bishop in the town of Wilcannia so Dunne took up residence in Hay before moving to Broken Hill where he administered the diocese. In Broken Hill, he built a small church which quickly had to be expanded due to the rapidly growing population in the mining town.

In June 1903, a meeting of over 800 people took place on the site of the Sacred Heart Church to discuss building a new cathedral for the diocese that would also serve as the city's parish church. The Sisters of Mercy donated the corner of their convent land for the cathedral to be built on. W. T. Knox was employed as the architect for the new cathedral, under the supervision of Bishop Dunne. The cathedral was made out of silver quarry stone, left over from the neighbouring silver mines, which was donated to the diocese by the North silver mines of Broken Hill. The foundation stone for the cathedral was place by Bishop Dunne on 6 December 1903.

The cathedral was opened and consecrated by Bishop Dunne on 2 July 1905. The construction was completed at a cost of 7,000 pounds. Approximately 1,500 people attended the opening of the cathedral, including Archbishop of Melbourne, Archbishop Thomas Carr and Coadjutor Archbishop Michael Kelly of Sydney.

At the time of its foundation in 1887, the Diocese of Wilcannia took up more than half the state of New South Wales. It had a Catholic population of 7,000 with eight priests and 800 children in the schools. By 1912, the Catholic population had grown to 19,000, with 19 priests and 3,000 children in Catholic schools, under the care of 146 religious.

== Illness and Death ==
On 18 August 1912, Dunne celebrated his episcopal silver jubilee, however his health began to decline soon after. Despite this, he still continued his duties, opening a new infants' school in the Broken Hill Convent grounds, a new infants' school at South Broken Hill, a new school and convent at Nyngan, a new school at Cobar, and a new church at Mathoura. He embarked on a tour of his vast diocese, visiting Wentworth, Balranald, Hay, Hillston, Cobar, and Bourke. The trip left him very ill and he was sent to Sydney to recover.

He recovered and returned to his diocese in time for Christmas 1915. He was also present for the Easter solemnities in 1916 however after celebrating Mass in the Cathedral on Pentecost Sunday, he became more feeble and required nursing. During the last three months of his life, he celebrated Mass in his private oratory but by mid-December, he was unable to do this any more. Dunne died on Christmas Day 1916, following a severe illness which had lasted several weeks. He was 70 years old.

His body was buried in the crypt of Sacred Heart Cathedral, Broken Hill.

Catholic Church titles
Preceded by new see	1st Catholic Bishop of Wilcannia; 1887–1916	Succeeded by William Hayden
