= Alan Cameron Walker =

Australian architect and philanthropist

Alan Cameron Walker (1865–1931) was an Australian architect and philanthropist, born in Hobart, Tasmania. The grandson of John Walker, he was educated at Hutchins School and apprenticed to Henry Hunter. He produced many Tasmanian government and other buildings during his career, and was also a keen silversmith, serving as President of the Tasmanian Arts and Crafts Society for 25 years. He was the first President of the Tasmanian Architect's Registration Board.

== Life ==
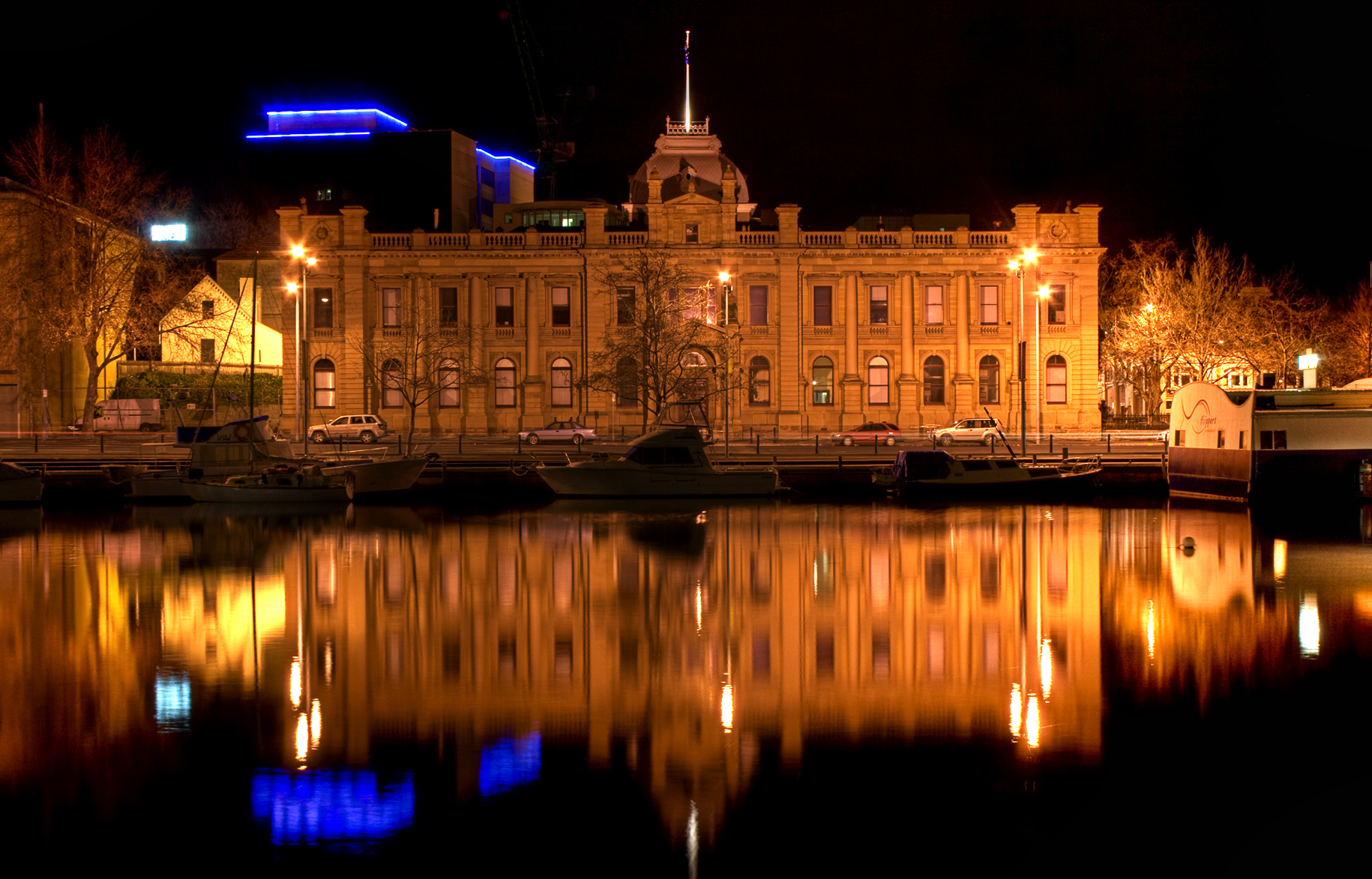
Old Customs House, Hobart, Tasmania, designed by Orlando Baker, but incorrectly attributed to Walker in his obituary notice.

Walker was born in 1865, fourth son of Herbert Walker. He was educated at the Hutchins School.

Walker was apprenticed to Henry Hunter. Upon completion of his apprenticeship, he studied in Britain under Professor Roger Smith and then worked for Sir Banister Fletcher recording sketches of historic British buildings. He was admitted an associate to the Royal Institute of British Architects and upon return to Australia he worked for the architectural firm of Ellerker & Kilburn in Melbourne. He then worked on his own, during which time he served on the council of the Royal Victorian Institute of Architects. He returned to Tasmania in 1895, six years after marrying Mabel Robertson. Mabel's mother and sister were lost with the SS Waratah. He had two children with Mabel, Huon Walker and C.N Walker, who married a Dr Atkins. Mabel would die in 1918.

In Tasmania he designed several major public buildings, as well as supervising major additions to St David's Anglican Cathedral, and was active in the arts community. He married his second wife Daisy Hook in 1922. He was part of the organising committee of an antique exhibition in aid of employment in 1931. He was a collector of Australian native plants, and also worked to establish bush gardens at the Mount Wellington springs.

=== Death ===
Walker died on 12 December 1931 of Valvular heart disease. Walker was buried in Cornelian Bay Cemetery Upon his death, his will was valued at net of £31,565. His will was appealed to the High Court by his wife Daisy regarding whether or not the £1000 annuity he had left her required her to live in his home of Huonden. When she was unsuccessful an appeal was then submitted to the Privy Council but dismissed.

== Legacy ==
The Alan Cameron Walker shield was awarded by the Arts and Craft Society for some years. It was won permanently by Friends' School, Hobart in 1936. A silver altar cross, designed by Walker, was dedicated to him at St David's Cathedral, Hobart in 1932.

== Architectural works ==
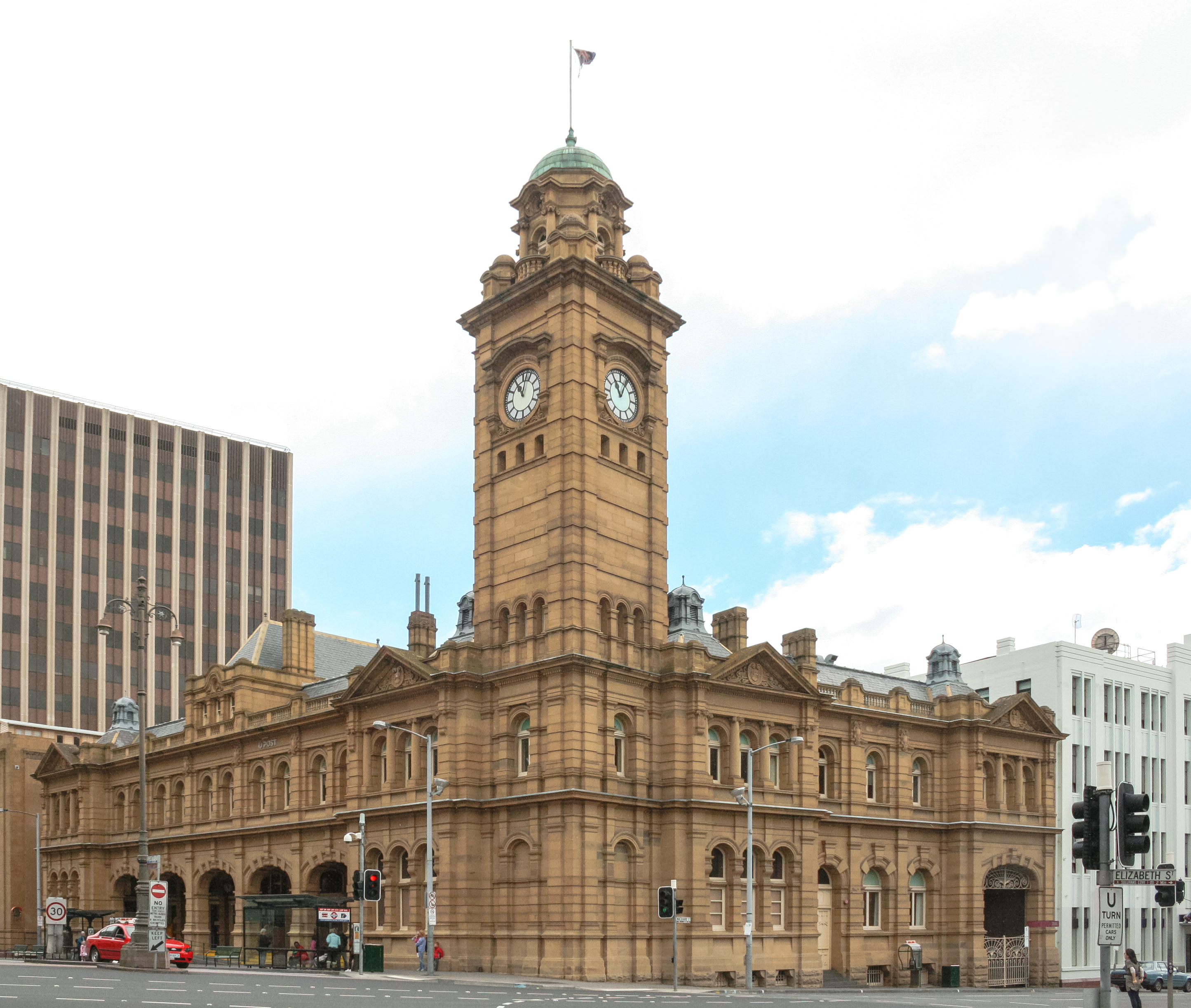
Hobart General Post Office, designed by Walker

- Hobart General Post Office
- Werndee (home of Premier of Tasmania Elliott Lewis)
- Old State Library (now Carnegie Building, Maritime Museum of Tasmania)
- St Raphael's, Fern Tree
- National Mutual Life Building, Hobart
- St David's Cathedral, Hobart cloisters addition
- Commercial Travelers Club, Launceston (demolished)
- Springs Hotel, Mt Wellington (destroyed, 1967 Tasmanian fires)
- St Peter's Catholic Church, Kempton, Tasmania

== Silversmithing ==
Walker was noted for his success in silversmithing, though he did it primarily as a hobby. A coffee pot fashioned by him is exhibited in the Art Gallery of South Australia.
