= Notre Dame Priory =

Benedictine priory in Tasmania, Australia

- Interactive map of Notre Dame Priory

Monastery information
- Order: Benedictines
- Established: 2017
- Diocese: Archdiocese of Hobart

People
- Founders: Pius Mary Noonan, O.S.B.

Site
- Location: Colebrook, Tasmania, Australia
- Website: https://www.notredamemonastery.org/

Notre Dame Priory is a Roman Catholic Benedictine monastery in Colebrook, Tasmania, Australia, founded in 2017. The life of the community is in accordance with the Rule of Saint Benedict, and is centred around the traditional practice of prayer and work, as well as devotion to the traditional Latin Mass and Breviarium Monasticum. It is Tasmania’s first Catholic monastery.

== Activities ==
The residents of the priory, in addition to prayers and religious activity, support themselves with agricultural activity such as animal husbandry and cropping. Additionally, one of their special ministries is running retreats for Catholic men and women. The residents conduct a conventual Mass each day in their church.

The priory has its own publishing house known as Cana Press to publish Catholic books and other printed material such as greetings cards and holy cards.

== History ==
The community was instituted as a private association of the faithful on 22 February 2017 by Fr Pius Mary Noonan O.S.B., formerly of the Abbey of Saint-Joseph de Clairval in Flavigny-sur-Ozerain, France, in the presence of Archbishop Julian Porteous of Hobart, and was installed in a property in Lindisfarne, Tasmania. Later the same year, the first group of four novices received the habit, and in December the community received canonical recognition as a public association of the faithful.

In 2018, the community purchased the Jerusalem Estate in Colebrook, and relocated there the following year. Southern Midlands Mayor Alex Green was supportive of the monastery and noted that the order "intend to be here for centuries".

In 2019 the monastery moved into the old manor house on the property. An old wooden church that is more than 100 years old, was relocated to the estate and in 2021 it was dedicated by the local bishop. Today it is called the chapel of the Immaculate Conception of Our Lady.

== See also ==
- Catholicism in Australia
- Monasticism
- List of monasteries in Australia
- List of communities using the Tridentine Mass
