= Anthony Ireland (bishop) =

Australian Catholic Archbishop (born 1957)

The Most Reverend Anthony Ireland
- Archbishop of Hobart
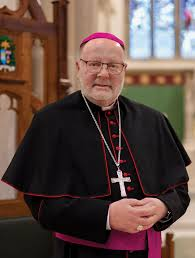
- Ireland standing in St Mary’s Cathedral, Hobart
- Church: Catholic Church
- Archdiocese: Hobart
- See: Holy See
- Appointed: 20 June 2025
- Installed: 12 August 2025
- Predecessor: Archbishop Julian Porteous
- Previous posts: Auxiliary Bishop of Melbourne and Titular Bishop of Carinola

Orders
- Ordination: 19 September 1987 by Thomas Francis Little
- Consecration: 31 July 2021 by Archbishop Peter Comensoli

Personal details
- Born: Anthony John Ireland; 28 April 1957 (age 69) East Melbourne, Victoria, Australia
- Denomination: Catholic Church
- Education: Corpus Christi College; Pontifical University of Saint Thomas Aquinas
- Motto: Confirm, strengthen, support
- Coat of arms

Styles of Anthony Ireland
- Reference style: The Most Reverend
- Spoken style: His Grace or Your Grace
- Religious style: Archbishop

Anthony John Ireland (born 28 April 1957) is an Australian Catholic prelate, who has served as Archbishop of Hobart since August 2025.

On 20 June 2025, Ireland was appointed by Pope Leo XIV as the new Archbishop of Hobart, Tasmania, after the retirement of Archbishop Julian Porteous. He was installed as the New Archbishop of Hobart on the 12th of August 2025.

He previously served as an Auxiliary Bishop of the Roman Catholic Archdiocese of Melbourne from 2021 until August 2025. He also previously served as parish priest of St Gregory the Great Parish, in Doncaster, Victoria.

== Early life ==
Ireland was born in East Melbourne, just a short walk from St Patrick's Cathedral, Melbourne. He was the eldest of three children and grew up in Caulfield, in Melbourne's inner south, in a home that fostered Catholic life and culture. The family attended Mass weekly, prayed the rosary daily and they were all involved in local sodalities.

He received his primary education at St. Aloysius, Caulfield and secondary education at De La Salle College, Malvern, run by the De La Salle Brothers. After graduating, he began work for National Australia Bank and later worked for the City of Hawthorn. He applied for seminary at Corpus Christi College in Clayton in his early 20s and entered in 1981.

== Priesthood ==
Ireland was ordained to the priesthood on 19 September 1987, by Archbishop of Melbourne Thomas Frank Little at St. Patrick's, Cathedral, Melbourne. Following his ordination, he did a short summer appointment at Nazareth Parish Grovedale and Torquay before his first permanent appointment as assistant priest at St. Patrick's Mentone.

He then served as assistant priest at Sacred Heart, Sandringham. In August 1995, he moved to St Jude's Parish, Langwarrin, firstly as administrator, and then as parish priest for a total of seven years. Later he would concurrently be parish priest at St Francis Xavier in Frankston. He also served as Dean of the Peninsula Deanery.

In 1990, he was asked to study in Rome where he studied both Moral and Spiritual Theology and was awarded higher degrees in both. Later, Archbishop Denis Hart invited him to undertake doctoral studies which were completed at the Pontifical University of St. Thomas Aquinas in Rome where the doctorate was awarded Summa cum Laude.

From 2009 to 2021, he served as parish priest of St Gregory the Great Parish, in Doncaster.

== Episcopate ==
Ireland was appointed Auxiliary Bishop of Melbourne by Pope Francis on 14 May 2021 and was given the titular see of Carinola in Italy. He was consecrated by Archbishop Peter Comensoli on 31 July 2021 in St. Patrick's, Cathedral, Melbourne.

On 20 June 2025, Ireland was appointed by Pope Leo XIV as the new Archbishop of Hobart, Tasmania, after the retirement of Archbishop Julian Porteous. He was installed as the New Archbishop of Hobart on the 12th of August 2025.

Religious titles
Preceded by Julian Porteous	Archbishop of Hobart; 2025 - present	Succeeded by Incumbent
