= Adrian Leo Doyle =

Australian prelate and archbishop

The Most Reverend Adrian Leo Doyle AM DD DCL
- Archbishop emeritus of Hobart
- See: Hobart
- Installed: 26 August 1999
- Term ended: 19 July 2013
- Predecessor: Eric D'Arcy
- Successor: Julian Porteous
- Other post: Coadjutor Archbishop of Hobart (1998–1999)

Orders
- Ordination: 20 December 1961
- Consecration: 6 February 1998

Personal details
- Born: 16 November 1936 (age 89) Hobart, Tasmania
- Denomination: Roman Catholic

Styles of Adrian Doyle
- Reference style: The Most Reverend
- Spoken style: Your Grace
- Religious style: Archbishop
- Posthumous style: not applicable

Adrian Leo Doyle AM (born 16 November 1936) is an Australian prelate of the Roman Catholic Church. He was the tenth Archbishop of Hobart.

== Early life and education ==
Adrian Doyle was born in Hobart, Tasmania, to Leo and Gertrude (née O'Donnell) Doyle. He attended St. Mary's College in Hobart, Sacred Heart College in New Town, and St. Virgil's College in Hobart before entering Corpus Christi College in Werribee, Victoria, in March 1955. He studied at the Collegio Propaganda Fide in Rome, where he was ordained as a priest by Grégoire-Pierre Cardinal Agagianian on 20 December 1961. He later earned a doctorate in canon law from the Pontifical Gregorian University in 1965.

== Priestly ministry ==
Doyle served on the Marriage Tribunal for the Hobart Archdiocese (1966–1998) He has been a judge on the Appeal Tribunal, President of the Canon Law Society of Australia and New Zealand, assistant priest at Invermay, Bellerive, and St Mary's Cathedral, and parish priest at Sandy Bay-Taroona (1974–1990).

He was chaplain to the Italian community in Hobart from (1973–1998), director of Renew (1990–1992), dean of the southern region (1982–1989), chancellor of the Archdiocese (1988–1996), and vicar general of the Archdiocese (1996–1998).

== Archbishop of Hobart ==
On 10 November 1997, Doyle was appointed Coadjutor Archbishop of Hobart by Pope John Paul II. He received his episcopal consecration on 6 February 1998 from Archbishop Eric D'Arcy. He later succeeded Archbishop D'Arcy as the tenth Archbishop of Hobart upon the latter's resignation on 26 July 1999.

Doyle has worked on the Australian Catholic Bishops Conference (ACBC), and on 26 January 2009 became a Member of the Order of Australia for his service to the Catholic Church in Australia and to the community, particularly as Archbishop of Hobart and through Caritas programs supporting international aid to developing countries.

Religious titles
Preceded by Eric D'Arcy	Archbishop of Hobart; 1999–2013	Succeeded by Julian Porteous
