= Archdiocese of Hobart =

Latin Catholic ecclesiastical territory in Australia

Archdiocese of Hobart Archidioecesis Hobartensis
- Coat of arms

Location
- Country: Australia
- Territory: Tasmania
- Ecclesiastical province: Immediately subject to the Holy See
- Coordinates: 42°53′09″S 147°19′35″E

Statistics
- Area: 67,914 km^{2} (26,222 sq mi)
- Population: Total; Catholics: (as of 2021); ▲541,760; ▲92,680 ( 17.1%)
- Parishes: ▼27

Information
- Denomination: Catholic Church
- Sui iuris church: Latin Church
- Rite: Roman Rite
- Established: 5 April 1842 as the Vicariate Apostolic of Hobart; 22 April 1842 as the Diocese of Hobart; 3 August 1888 as the Archdiocese of Hobart
- Cathedral: St Mary's Cathedral, Hobart
- Patron saint: Saint Patrick

Current leadership
- Pope: Leo XIV
- Archbishop: Anthony Ireland

Map

Website
- hobart.catholic.org.au

The Archdiocese of Hobart is a Latin Church ecclesiastical territory or archdiocese of the Catholic Church in Australia located in Hobart and covering Tasmania, Australia.

Immediately subject to the Holy See, the area covered was initially administered by the Apostolic Vicariate of New Holland and Van Diemen's Land. In 1842, the Vicariate Apostolic of Hobart was erected; elevated as a diocese a few weeks later; and as an archdiocese in 1888.

St Mary's Cathedral is the seat of the Catholic Archbishop of Hobart, currently Anthony Ireland, installed on the 12th of August, 2025.

== History ==
Established 5 April 1842 as the Vicariate Apostolic of Hobart and became Diocese of Hobart on 22 April 1842. On 3 August 1888 the diocese became the Archdiocese of Hobart.

== Bishops ==
The following individuals have been appointed as Bishops of Hobart or any of its precursor titles:

Order	Name	Title	Date enthroned	Reign ended	Term of office	Reason for term end
1	Robert Willson †	Bishop of Hobart	22 April 1842	16 February 1866	23 years, 300 days	Resigned and appointed Bishop Emeritus of Hobart
2	Daniel Murphy †	Coadjutor Bishop of Hobart	14 November 1865	8 March 1866	114 days	Succeeded as Bishop of Hobart
2	Daniel Murphy †	Bishop of Hobart	8 March 1866	3 August 1888	22 years, 148 days	Elevated as Archbishop of Hobart
2	Daniel Murphy †	Archbishop of Hobart	3 August 1888	29 December 1907	19 years, 148 days	Died in office
3	Patrick Delany †	Coadjutor Archbishop of Hobart	15 June 1893	29 December 1907	14 years, 197 days	Succeeded as Archbishop of Hobart
3	Patrick Delany †	Archbishop of Hobart	29 December 1907	7 May 1926	18 years, 129 days	Died in office
4	William Barry †	Coadjutor Archbishop of Hobart	7 April 1919	8 May 1926	7 years, 31 days	Succeeded as Archbishop of Hobart
4	William Barry †	Archbishop of Hobart	8 May 1926	13 June 1929	3 years, 36 days	Died in office
5	William Hayden †	Archbishop of Hobart	11 February 1930	2 October 1936	6 years, 234 days	Died in office
6	Justin Simonds †	Archbishop of Hobart	18 February 1937	6 September 1942	5 years, 200 days	Appointed as Coadjutor Archbishop of Melbourne
7	Ernest Victor Tweedy †	Archbishop of Hobart	7 December 1942	20 September 1955	12 years, 287 days	Resigned and appointed Archbishop Emeritus of Hobart
8	Guilford Clyde Young †	Coadjutor Archbishop of Hobart	10 October 1954	20 September 1955	345 days	Succeeded as Archbishop of Hobart
8	Guilford Clyde Young †	Archbishop of Hobart	20 September 1955	16 March 1988	32 years, 178 days	Died in office
9	Eric D'Arcy †	Archbishop of Hobart	24 October 1988	26 July 1999	10 years, 275 days	Retired and appointed Archbishop Emeritus of Hobart
10	Adrian Leo Doyle	Coadjutor Archbishop of Hobart	10 November 1997	26 July 1999	1 year, 258 days	Succeeded as Archbishop of Hobart
10	Adrian Leo Doyle	Archbishop of Hobart	26 July 1999	19 July 2013	13 years, 358 days	Retired and appointed Archbishop Emeritus of Hobart
11	Julian Porteous	Archbishop of Hobart	17 September 2013	12 August 2025	13 years, 38 days	Resigned and appointed Archbishop Emeritus of Hobart
12	Anthony Ireland	Archbishop of Hobart	12 August 2025	present	1 year, 74 days	Incumbent

The above table also includes coadjutors, all of whom later served in this see. There was another coadjutor whose appointment did not take effect: Thomas Butler †, appointed Coadjutor Bishop on 13 Mar 1860.

=== Other priests of this diocese who became bishops ===
- Anthony Joseph Burgess †, appointed Coadjutor Bishop of Wewak, Papua New Guinea in 2000
- Geoffrey Hylton Jarrett, appointed Coadjutor Bishop of Lismore in 2000

== Cathedral ==
St Mary's Cathedral, Hobart is the cathedral for the Roman Catholic Archdiocese of Hobart.

== Parishes ==
=== Southern Tasmania ===
Parish	Location	Church name	Image
Bellerive-Lindisfarne Parish	Bellerive	Corpus Christi	
Bellerive-Lindisfarne Parish	Lindisfarne	Church of the Incarnation	
Bellerive-Lindisfarne Parish	Rokeby	John Paul II	
Bridgewater-Brighton Parish	Bridgewater	St Paul's	
Bridgewater-Brighton Parish	Pontville	St Matthew's	
Cathedral Parish	Hobart	St Mary's Cathedral	
Cathedral Parish	New Town	Sacred Heart	
Central Tasmania Parish	New Norfolk	St Peter's	
Central Tasmania Parish	Ouse	Immaculate Conception	
Central Tasmania Parish	Bothwell	St Andrew's	
Central Tasmania Parish	Tunnack	St Brigid's	
Central Tasmania Parish	Ellendale	St Colman's	
Central Tasmania Parish	Oatlands	St Paul's	
Claremont Parish	Claremont	St Bernard's	
Glenorchy Parish	Glenorchy	St John's	
Glenorchy Parish	Chigwell	St Monica's	
Hobart Parish	Hobart	St Joseph's	
Huon Valley Parish	Cygnet	St James	
Huon Valley Parish	Geeveston	St Joseph	
Huon Valley Parish	Ranelagh	St Mary of the Cross Catholic Church	
Huon Valley Parish	Dover	St Mary Our Hope	
Kingston Channel Parish	Kingston Beach	Christ the Priest	
Kingston Channel Parish	Kettering	Church of the Holy Spirit	
Kingston Channel Parish	Kingston	St Aloysius	
Kingston Channel Parish	Alonnah	St Brendans	
Kingston Channel Parish	Snug	St Mary's	
Moonah-Lutana Parish	Moonah	St Therese's	
Richmond Parish	Richmond	St John the Evangelist	
Richmond Parish	Dodges Ferry	Community Centre Hall	
Richmond Parish	Triabunna	St Anne's	
Richmond Parish	Colebrook	St Patrick's	
Richmond Parish	Sorell	St Thomas'	
Sandy Bay Parish	Sandy Bay	Holy Spirit	
Sandy Bay Parish	Sandy Bay	St Canice	
Sandy Bay Parish	Taroona	St Pius X	
South Hobart Parish	South Hobart	St Francis Xavier's	

=== Northern Tasmania ===
Parish	Location	Church name	Image
Campbell Town Parish	Campbell Town	St Michael's	
Campbell Town Parish	Swansea	Our Lady of the Perpetual Succour	
Campbell Town Parish	Ross	Our Lady of the Sacred Heart	
Flinders Island Parish	Whitemark	St Paul's	
George Town Parish	George Town	Our Lady Star of the Sea	
George Town Parish	Karoola	Sacred Heart	
George Town Parish	Lilydale	St Anne's	
Kings Meadows Parish	Youngtown	St Peter's	
Kings Meadows Parish	Longford	St Augustine's	
Launceston Parish	Launceston	Church of the Apostles	
Launceston Parish	West Launceston	Carmelite Monastery	
Launceston Parish	Newstead	Sacred Heart	
Launceston Parish	Invermay	St Finn Barr's	
Launceston Parish	Prospect Vale	St Patrick's College Chapel	
Meander Valley Parish	Westbury	Holy Trinity	
Meander Valley Parish	Deloraine	Holy Redeemer	
Scottsdale Parish	Scottsdale	St Patrick's	
Scottsdale Parish	Ringarooma	Sacred Heart	
Scottsdale Parish	Bridport	St Mary's	
St Mary's Parish	Bicheno	Bicheno Community Church	
St Mary's Parish	St Marys	St Mary of the Assumption	
St Mary's Parish	Mangana	Our Lady of the Sacred Heart	
St Mary's Parish	St Helens	St Helena & St Stanislaus	
St Mary's Parish	Fingal	St Joseph's	
West Tamar Parish	Riverside	St Francis of Assisi	
West Tamar Parish	Glengarry	St Canice	
West Tamar Parish	Beaconsfield	St Francis Xavier	

=== North Western Tasmania ===
Parish	Location	Church name
Burnie-Wynyard Parish	Burnie	St Mary's Star of the Sea
Burnie-Wynyard Parish	Burnie	Marist Regional College Chapel
Burnie-Wynyard Parish	Somerset	Sacred Heart
Burnie-Wynyard Parish	Wynyard	St Brigid's
Burnie-Wynyard Parish	Yolla	St Joseph's
Circular Head Parish	Smithton	St Peter Chanel
Circular Head Parish	Stanley	Our Star of the Sea
King Island Parish	Currie, King Island	Our Lady Star of the Sea
Mersey Leven Parish	Devonport	Our Lady of Lourdes
Mersey Leven Parish	Sheffield	Holy Cross Church
Mersey Leven Parish	Ulverstone	Sacred Heart
Mersey Leven Parish	Port Sorell	St Joseph's Mass Centre
Mersey Leven Parish	Penguin	St Mary's
Mersey Leven Parish	Latrobe	St Patrick's
West Coast Parish	Queenstown	St Joseph's
West Coast Parish	Strahan	Holy Trinity (parish makes use of Anglican parish church of the same name)
West Coast Parish	Zeehan	St Fursaeus
West Coast Parish	Rosebery	St Joseph's

== Monasteries ==
Notre Dame Priory is a Benedictine monastery in Colebrook, Tasmania, Australia, founded in 2017 which is part of the Archdiocese.

== Controversy ==
In 2007 Gregory Ferguson, a Marist priest, was sentenced to two years jail (eligible for parole after 12 months) for offences in 1971 against two boys aged 13 at Marist College, Burnie, Tasmania. On 13 December 2007 he was sentenced to an additional three years' jail for offences against a third boy.

While in 2008, a jury found former priest Roger Michael Bellemore guilty on three counts of maintaining a sexual relationship with a young person under the age of 17 years in the 1960s and 1970s, while he was at the same College.

In 2015, Archbishop Julian Porteous was notified that a complaint had been filed with the office of Tasmania's Anti-discrimination Commissioner in relation to the distribution in all Tasmanian Catholic schools of a booklet, Don't Mess with Marriage, stating marriage should be a "heterosexual union between a man and a woman" and changing the law would endanger a child's upbringing. The complaint was filed by a transgender activist and Federal Greens candidate Martine Delaney. The complaint was called "'an attempt to silence' the Church over same-sex marriage" by Archbishop Porteous. The complaint was treated as a possible breach of the Anti-Discrimination Act 1998 (Tas), and sparked fierce debate on the issues of freedom of religion, freedom of expression, and tolerance. The complaint was ultimately withdrawn.

It has been reported that "The real problem with the Porteous case was that it was unresolved".

== See also ==
- Roman Catholicism in Australia
