= General Post Office, Hobart =

Heritage listed building in Tasmania, Australia

General Post Office Hobart
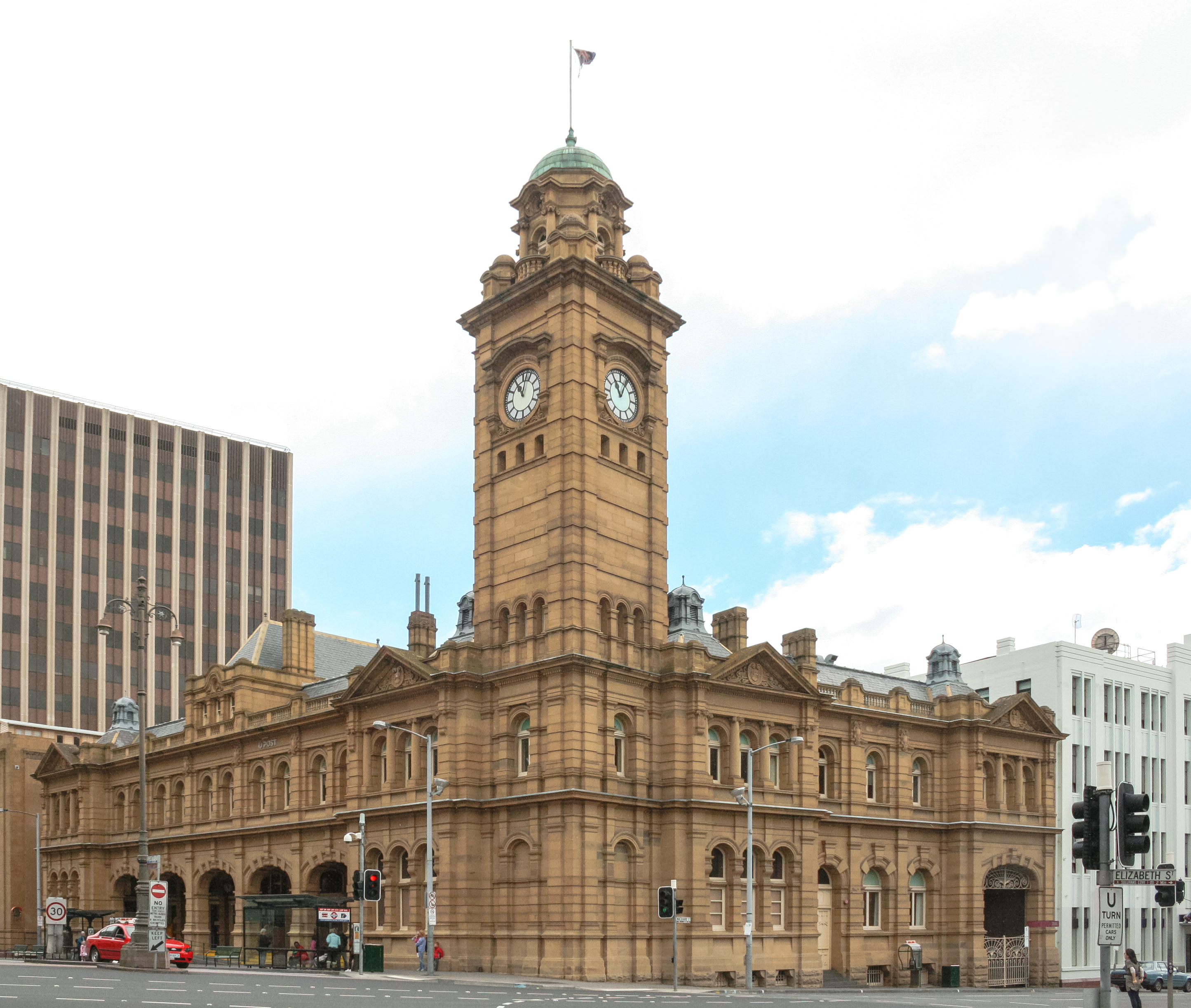
- Interactive map of the General Post Office; Hobart area

General information
- Architectural style: Edwardian Baroque
- Location: 9 Elizabeth St, Hobart, Australia
- Coordinates: 42.8824°S 147.3301°E
- Groundbreaking: 1901
- Opened: 1905
- Cost: £30,000–£35,000 (AUD $50,028)
- Owner: Australia Post

Design and construction
- Architect: Alan Cameron Walker

Tasmanian Heritage Register
- Place ID: 165
- Status: Permanently Registered

General Post Office (abbreviation GPO, commonly known as the Hobart GPO) is a landmark building located on the corner of Elizabeth Street and Macquarie Street in Hobart, Tasmania, Australia. It stands next to the former Mercury Building and has served as the headquarters of the Tasmanian Postal system since its construction in 1905, though mail processing has now been moved to Glenorchy.

It has been listed on the Commonwealth Heritage List since 2004.

== History ==
The Hobart General Post Office (GPO) was constructed between 1901 and 1905 on the site known as ‘Lords Corner’ at the north corner Elizabeth and Macquarie Street. The government had acquired the site in 1892, it being diagonally opposite Franklin Square, a town square laid out by the NSW Governor Macquarie in 1811, who intended it to be surrounded by a church and courthouse or town hall and main guard building. By 1894, public buildings including the town hall, the supreme court and public offices, both facing Macquarie Street, flanked the square, which was planted as a public park.

An architectural competition for the design of a new GPO was announced on 20 June 1899 and attracted nine entries, and an Edwardian Baroque style at a cost of £30,000–£35,000 design by a local architect Alan Cameron Walker was declared the winner. On 6 July 1901, the visiting Duke and Duchess of York (later King George V and Queen Mary) laid the foundation stone.

The Commonwealth government however refused to fund the post office tower and bells, calling them 'enormous and unnecessary'. The £1,465 to build them was raised by public subscription. It was named the Queen Victoria Clock Tower and opened on 22 June 1906, a year after the rest of the building. The clock was made by Fritz Ziegeler of Melbourne.It has the traditional Westminster chimes and is fitted with a Denison double three-legged gravity escapement with jewelled pallets and hardened legs. The bells were made by John Taylor & Co in Loughborough, England. Fritz Ziegeler made many clocks in Tasmania. His other public clock in Hobart is in the Palfreymans Building Corner Elizebeth and Burnett St, North Hobart, this was installed in 1919 and is a small timepiece. In 1912 Roald Amundsen posted his telegram to the King of Norway from Hobart GPO to announce the first successful trip to the South Pole.

In June 2015 while the GPO was undergoing restoration, vandals climbed scaffolding on the tower, scrawled graffiti on it, and damaged the GPO clock. It was repaired.
