= St Mary's Cathedral, Hobart =

Cathedral in Hobart, Tasmania, Australia

St Mary's Cathedral
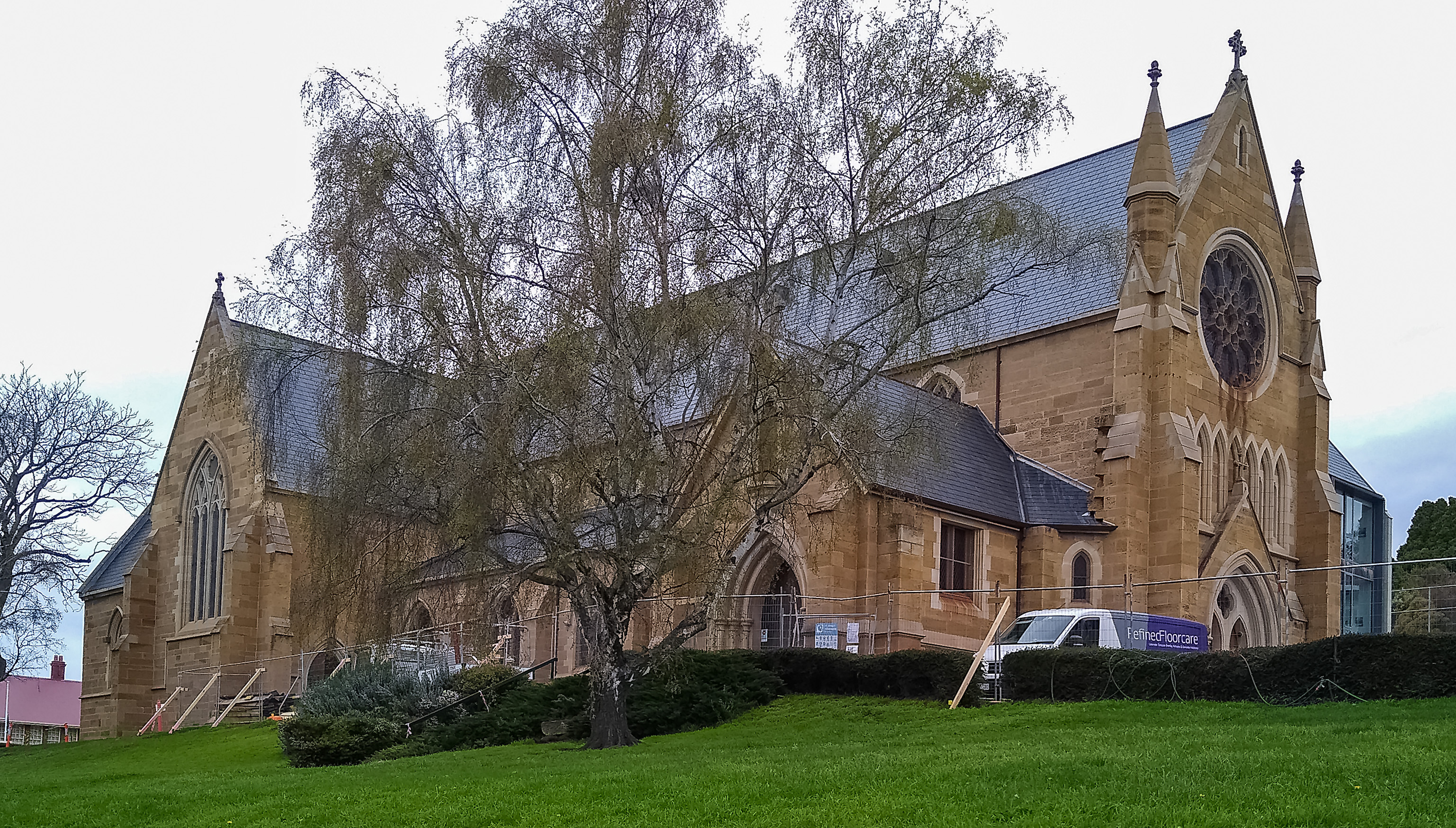
- St Mary's Cathedral, Hobart

- Location in Hobart
- 42°52′52″S 147°19′09″E
- Location: Hobart, Tasmania
- Country: Australia
- Denomination: Catholic
- Website: stmaryscathedralhobart.org.au

History
- Status: Cathedral
- Founded: 12 September 1860
- Dedication: Sacred Heart
- Dedicated: 29 June 1865 rededicated 23 January 1881
- Consecrated: 14 July 1866

Architecture
- Functional status: Active
- Architects: William Wardell (1860); Henry Hunter (1898)
- Architectural type: Cathedral
- Style: Gothic Revival architecture
- Years built: 1822 (first cathedral); 1866 (nave completed); 1881 (rebuilt)
- Groundbreaking: 1860

Specifications
- Length: 26 metres (84 ft)
- Width: 16 metres (52 ft)
- Materials: Sandstone

Administration
- Province: Hobart
- Archdiocese: Archdiocese of Hobart
- Parish: Cathedral

Clergy
- Archbishop: Anthony Ireland

St Mary's Cathedral in Hobart, Tasmania, Australia, is the seat of the Roman Catholic Archbishop of Hobart, presently Anthony Ireland.

The cathedral's origins can be traced back to 1822 when the first permanent Tasmanian priest Philip Conolly (1786–1839) constructed a temporary wooden chapel near the present cathedral site and dedicated to God, under the invocation of St. Virgilius, an "Irish Saint".

== Location and features ==
St Mary's Cathedral is located in Harrington Street, Hobart, and is place of worship for the Roman Catholic Archdiocese of Hobart.

St Mary's College is located next to the cathedral. The college celebrates the Catholic liturgical year by attending Mass.

== History ==
The first cathedral foundation stone was laid in 1860 to a design by William Wardell, a student of Augustus Pugin. The cathedral was consecrated in 1866. The cathedral was built in the Gothic Revival architectural style.

Structural problems caused by faulty construction resulted in the cathedral being largely dismantled and re-constructed to a new design based on Wardell's initial plans, by Hobart architect Henry Hunter. He laid the new foundation stone in 1878.

A Norman-era baptismal font, with connections to Pugin is believed to have been installed in St Mary's Cathedral, Hobart. A historian noted that 'the detail repertoire of this font is characteristic of transitional work of roughly the period 1170 to 1200.'

== Organ ==
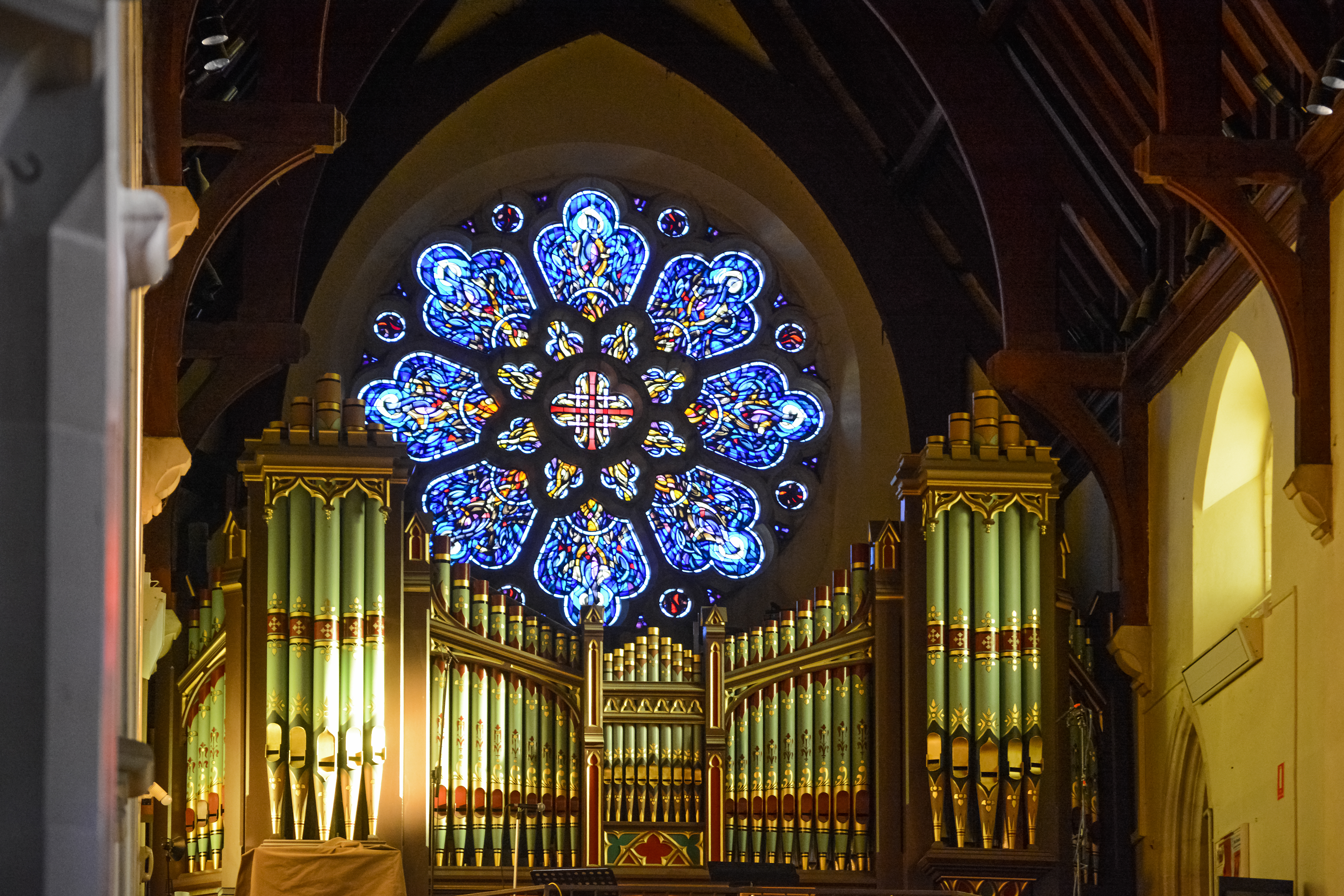

The first organ at St Mary's Cathedral was moved to Sacred Heart Catholic Church, New Town. The current organ was built in 1893 by Fincham & Hobday for the International Exhibition of Industry, Science and Art, Queen's Domain, Hobart of 1894 where the organ was awarded the first prize. This organ was installed in the cathedral in June 1895 in its present location. Subsequent rebuilds and renovations of the organ occurred in 1934 by Hill, Norman & Beard; in 1957 by Keith Davis; in 1966 by George Fincham & Sons; and in 2007–2009 by Wakeley Pipe Organs, when minor additions were made.

== Stained glass windows ==
Dominated by the exquisite Hardman Studio window in the style of a fourteenth century Gothic window; the five lancets depict pivotal scenes from the Gospels and the tracery at the top of the window details heavenly images, from 1869.

The rose window in the west end of the cathedral (1981), the Pentecost window (1989), and the Heroic and Saintly Women (1995) are other windows specific to the cathedral.
