= Michael Glennon =

Michael Glennon is the name of:

- Mike Glennon, American football quarterback
- Michael J. Glennon, American law professor and author
- Michael Glennon (former priest), Australian former Roman Catholic priest and child abuser

== See also ==
- Glennon
