= Alec Southwell =

Judge of the Supreme Court of Victoria

The Honourable Alec Southwell QC

Justice of the Supreme Court of Victoria
- In office 3 April 1979 – 11 April 1997

Personal details
- Born: 1 November 1926
- Died: 26 January 2018 (aged 91)
- Education: University of Melbourne
- Profession: Lawyer

Military service
- Branch/service: Royal Australian Naval Reserve
- Years of service: 1944–1945

Alec James Southwell QC (1 November 1926 – 26 January 2018) was a judge from 3 April 1979 until 11 April 1997 in the Supreme Court of Victoria, which is the highest ranking court in the Australian State of Victoria. At the time of his retirement, Southwell was believed to be Australia's longest-serving judge.

== Early life ==
Southwell was educated at Melbourne Grammar School and the University of Melbourne.

Southwell served with the Royal Australian Naval Reserve in New Guinea and Morotai in the later part of World War II.

== Legal career ==
He was appointed a Queen's Counsel in 1968 and a County Court judge in 1969.

Southwell was part of the full bench that quashed a conviction of Michael Glennon for charges of paedophilia while he was a Catholic priest. Southwell was the dissenting judge who held that the decision could lead to a situation where adverse media publicity could prevent someone from ever facing trial. The situation had been precipitated by Derryn Hinch had used his radio program to campaign against Glennon.

== Following retirement ==
Following his retirement, he remained a reserve judge of the Supreme Court of Victoria and a member of the Legal Profession Tribunal which considers disciplinary cases against lawyers until 2001.

In 2002, Southwell was appointed by the Roman Catholic Church to investigate accusations of sexual abuse against Archbishop George Pell.

== See also ==
- Judiciary of Australia
- List of judges of the Supreme Court of Victoria
- Southwell inquiry
- Victorian Bar Association
