= Libero Milone =

Italian businessman

- Born: The Hague
- Occupation: Businessman
- Known for: first auditor-general of the Vatican

Libero Milone is a Netherlands-born Italian businessman who has held high-ranking positions at Deloitte and who was appointed by Pope Francis to be the first auditor-general of the Vatican in 2015 before being forced to resign in 2017.

== Professional life ==
Milone was born in The Hague and was educated in The Netherlands and the United Kingdom.

After starting his career in London, he began a 32-year career with Deloitte and moved to Italy in 1975, where he became a partner in Deloitte's audit department in 1984. He served as Deloitte's Italian human resources leader (1984–1995), then its Europe-wide human resources leader (1991–1995), and finally as its managing director of human resources worldwide, based in New York (1998–2003), and then chairman and CEO of Deloitte in Italy (2003-2007). He was also a member of Deloitte's worldwide management (1998–2003), coordinator of its worldwide aviation interest group (1996-2002), managing director of its worldwide aviation and transport industry group (2002–2007), and member of its worldwide board and governance committee (2003–2007).

From 2008 to 2011, he was a senior advisor and honorary president of Protiviti, a multinational corporate governance and risk management consultancy. He has served as a nonexecutive director of companies including Fiat Industrial s.P.a., the Poltrona Frau Group, Indesit, Tofaş, and Falck Renewables. From 2008 to 2011, he also served as a member of the audit committee of the UN World Food Programme. In 1975, he became a Chartered Accountant of England and Wales. He became a member of Italy's Istituto Nazionale dei Revisori Contabili in 1995 and of NedCommunity, the Italian Association of Non-Executive Directors and Supervisory Board Members, in 2008.

From 2012 to 2016, he was chairman of his own consulting company, Milone Associates.

== Auditor General of the Vatican ==
On 5 June 2015, Pope Francis named Milone the auditor general of the Vatican, with an expected term of 5 years. Cardinal George Pell, then the head of the Vatican's Secretariat for the Economy, stated that Milone would be answerable only to the pope and free to review the finances and management of any department of the Vatican. Statutes gave Milone “full autonomy and independence”, including the authority to “receive and investigate any reports on anomalous activities” of Vatican entities. Milone was in charge of a staff of around a dozen people. (Note: Different news stories identify Milone's staff as consisting of 12 or 14 people.)

In September 2015, several months into his tenure, Milone began to suspect that his office computer had been tampered with. According to Milone, the external company he contacted to inspect the computer reported that it had been targeted for unauthorized access and that Milone's secretary's computer had been infected with spyware.

According to later statements by Milone, he met with Pope Francis every 4–5 weeks from the time of his hiring until April 2016, after which he never met with him again. In September 2016, Milone was told that to see the pope he would have to make a request via the Secretariat of State, but his two written requests went unanswered.

The Vatican gendarmerie raided Milone's office on June 18, 2017, and the following day, he was questioned by Vatican police for 12 hours and compelled to resign his position by Archbishop Giovanni Angelo Becciu, then the substitute for general affairs in the Vatican Secretariat of State. The charges against him included misusing funds to hire an external company to check the security of his office's computers, carrying out investigations that violated the statutes of his department, and looking into the affairs of high-ranking churchmen without authorization. Becciu and Domenico Giani, then the head of the Vatican gendarmerie, stated that if Milone had not resigned, he would have been prosecuted.

According to later statements by Milone, he sent a letter to Pope Francis asserting his innocence in July 2017, but received no reply, despite believing that the letter had reached the pope.

Milone subsequently told reporters that the allegations were false, that he had been intimidated into resigning and signing a resignation letter prepared in advance, and that he believed he had been ousted because some people in the Vatican wanted to slow down Pope Francis's efforts at financial reform, though he could not give details because of nondisclosure agreements he had signed. In response, Becciu told reporters that Milone's claims were “false and unjustified," saying that Milone had gone "against all the rules and was spying on the private lives of his superiors and staff, including me.” Giani claimed that there had been “overwhelming evidence” against Milone.

In May 2018, the Vatican announced it had dropped all charges against Milone.

In 2019, Milone told the Financial Times that he had been ousted from his position after investigating secret bank accounts, including some linked to a controversial 200 million euro London property investment authorized by Becciu. In 2020, Becciu was forced to resign the privileges of the cardinalate due to his involvement in numerous financial scandals.
