= Glennon =

Glennon is an Irish surname and given name. It is an anglicized form of the Gaelic Patronymic name Mag Leannáin, meaning "son of Leannán." The root word of this name is "leann," meaning "cloak." The surname was first found in Leinster, where they held a family seat from ancient times.

== Surname ==
- Anthony Glennon (born 1999), English footballer
- Bert Glennon (1893–1967), American cinematographer and film director, father of James Glennon
- Davey Glennon (fl. 2008–present), Irish hurler
- David Glennon (fl. 2005–2013, Irish Gaelic footballer, brother of Denis Glennon
- Denis Glennon (fl. 2004–present), Irish Gaelic footballer
- Frank Glennon, Irish soccer player in the 1940s
- James Glennon (1942–2006), American cinematographer
- Ted Glennon (born 1980), California Winemaker
- James H. Glennon (1857–1940), United States Navy rear admiral
- Jim Glennon (born 1953), Irish former politician and former rugby player
- John Alan Glennon (born 1970), American geographer and explorer
- John J. Glennon (1862–1946), Roman Catholic Archbishop of the Archdiocese of Saint Louis, from 1903 to his death
- Joseph Glennon (1889–1926), English footballer and cricketer
- Matt Glennon (born 1978), English former footballer
- Michael Charles Glennon (c. 1944–2014), Australian Roman Catholic priest and convicted child molester
- Mike Glennon, American football quarterback
- Pat Glennon (1927–2004), Australian jockey
- Paul Glennon, 21st century Canadian writer
- Sean Glennon (born 1985), American football quarterback

== Given name ==
- Glennon Doyle Melton (born 1976), American author, activist and philanthropist
- Glennon Engleman (1927–1999), American professional assassin and dentist
