= Saint John's Tower =

Saint John's Tower may refer to:

- Saint John's Tower (Vatican City)
- Saint John's Tower (Castledermot)
- Torre San Giovanni, Ugento
