= George Pell =

Australian Catholic cardinal (1941–2023)

His Eminence George Pell AC
- Cardinal; Prefect of the Secretariat for the Economy
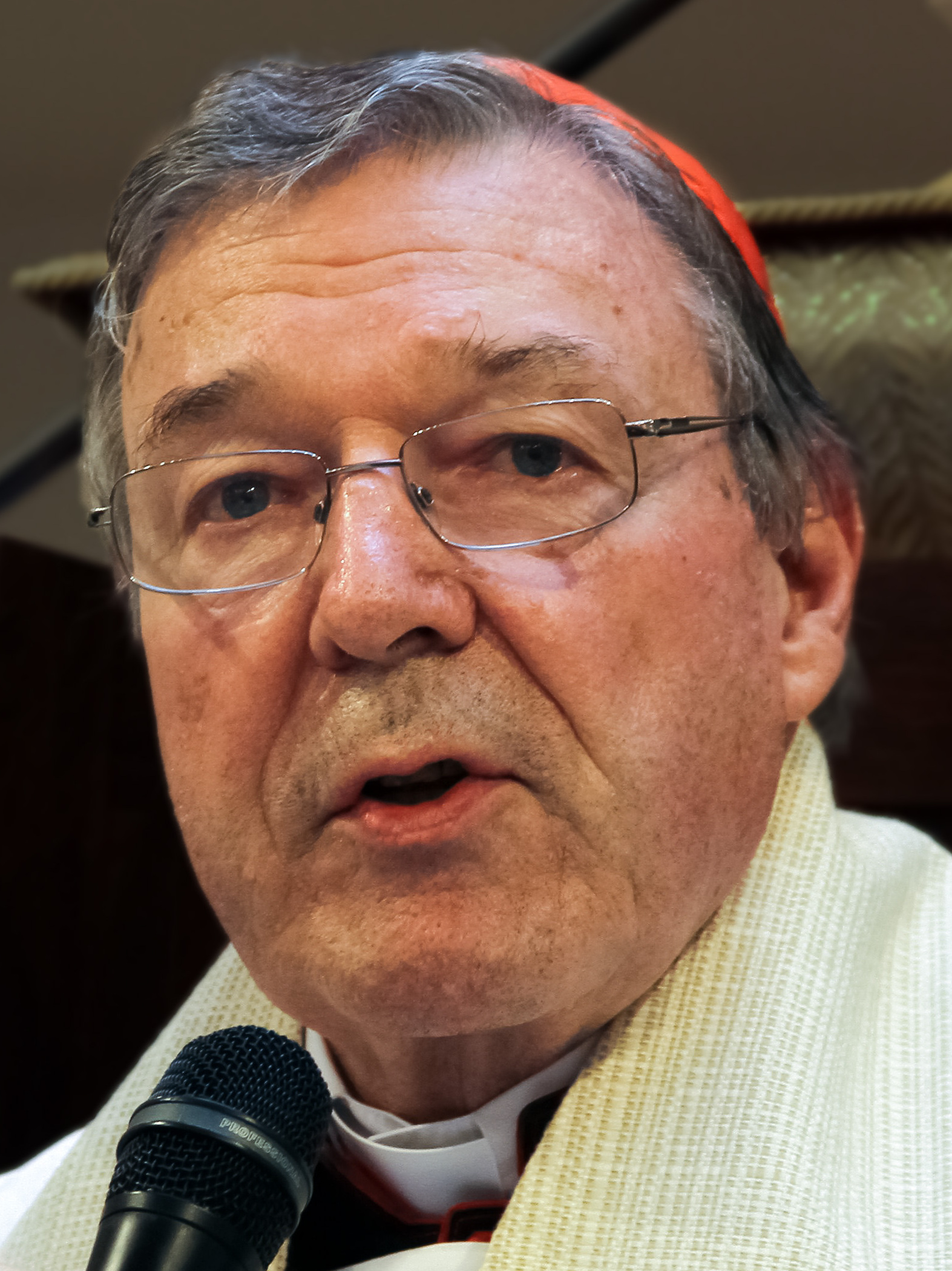
- Pell in 2012
- Church: Catholic
- Appointed: 24 February 2014
- Term ended: 24 February 2019
- Successor: Juan Antonio Guerrero Alves
- Other post: Cardinal Priest of Santa Maria Domenica Mazzarello (2003‍–‍2023)
- Previous posts: Titular Bishop of Scala (1987‍–‍1996); Auxiliary Bishop of Melbourne (1987‍–‍1996); Archbishop of Melbourne (1996‍–‍2001); Archbishop of Sydney (2001‍–‍2014); Member of the Council of Cardinal Advisers (2013‍–‍2018); Prefect of the Secretariat for the Economy (2014‍–‍2019)

Orders
- Ordination: 16 December 1966 by Gregorio Pietro Agagianian
- Consecration: 21 May 1987 by Frank Little
- Created cardinal: 21 October 2003 by John Paul II
- Rank: Cardinal priest

Personal details
- Born: 8 June 1941 Ballarat, Victoria, Australia
- Died: 10 January 2023 (aged 81) Rome, Italy
- Buried: St Mary's Cathedral, Sydney
- Education: Corpus Christi College, Melbourne; Pontifical Urban University; Campion Hall, Oxford; Monash University
- Motto: Nolite timere (Latin for 'Be not afraid')
- Signature: George Pell's signature

- Coat of arms: George Pell's coat of arms

Ordination history
History
Priestly ordination
- Ordained by: Gregorio Pietro Agagianian
- Date: 16 December 1966
- Place: St. Peter's Basilica, Vatican City
Episcopal consecration
- Principal consecrator: Frank Little (Melbourne)
- Co-consecrators: Ronald Mulkearns (Ballarat); Joseph O'Connell (Melbourne aux.)
- Date: 21 May 1987
- Place: St Patrick's Cathedral, Melbourne
Cardinalate
- Elevated by: Pope John Paul II
- Date: 21 October 2003
Episcopal succession
Bishops consecrated by George Pell as principal consecrator
- Denis Hart: 9 December 1997
- Joseph Grech: 10 February 1999
- Christopher Toohey: 30 August 2001
- Julian Porteous: 3 September 2003
- Anthony Fisher: 3 September 2003
- Terence Brady: 16 November 2007
- Michael McKenna: 26 June 2009
- Peter Comensoli: 8 June 2011
- William Wright: 15 June 2011

Styles of George Pell
- Reference style: His Eminence
- Spoken style: Your Eminence
- Religious style: Cardinal
- Informal style: Cardinal

George Pell (8 June 1941 – 10 January 2023) was an Australian cardinal of the Catholic Church. He was the inaugural prefect of the Secretariat for the Economy at the Vatican from 2014 to 2019 and a member of the Council of Cardinal Advisers from 2013 to 2018. Ordained a priest in 1966 and bishop in 1987, he was made a cardinal in 2003. Pell was the eighth Archbishop of Sydney (2001–2014), the seventh Archbishop of Melbourne (1996–2001) and an auxiliary bishop of Melbourne (1987–1996). He was also an author and columnist. As a conservative, Pell maintained a high public profile on a wide range of issues, while retaining an adherence to Catholic orthodoxy.

Pell worked as a priest in rural Victoria and in Melbourne and also chaired the aid organisation Caritas Australia (part of Caritas Internationalis) from 1988 to 1997. He was appointed a delegate to the Australian Constitutional Convention in 1998, received the Centenary Medal from the Australian government in 2003 and was appointed a Companion of the Order of Australia (AC) in the 2005 Queen's Birthday Honours. During his tenure as Archbishop of Melbourne, Pell set up the "Melbourne Response" protocol in 1996 to investigate and deal with complaints of child sexual abuse in the archdiocese. The protocol was the first of its kind in the world and was subjected to a variety of criticism.

In 2018, Pell was convicted of sexually abusing a boy in Melbourne in the 1990s, and served 404 days in prison, much of it in solitary confinement. On appeal the convictions were quashed and Pell acquitted in 2020 by the High Court of Australia in the decision Pell v The Queen. A separate investigation by the Holy See's Congregation for the Doctrine of the Faith into these allegations of abuse was concluded upon his acquittal by the High Court. In 2025 it was announced that the National Redress Scheme, a non-judicial program, had accepted that Pell had sexually abused two boys in Ballarat in the 1970s, with compensation paid to one of those boys five weeks prior to Pell's death.

According to findings released by Australia's Royal Commission into Institutional Responses to Child Sexual Abuse in 2020, Pell knew of child sexual abuse by clergy by the 1970s but did not take adequate action to address it. Pell said he was "surprised" and that the royal commission's findings "are not supported by evidence".

== Early life and education ==
Pell was born on 8 June 1941 in Ballarat, Victoria, to George Arthur and Margaret Lillian Pell (née Burke). His father was a non-practising Anglican whose ancestors were from Leicestershire in England; he was also a heavyweight boxing champion. His mother was a devout Catholic of Irish descent. As a child, Pell underwent 24 operations to remove an abscess in his throat.

Pell attended Loreto Convent and St Patrick's College in Ballarat. At St Patrick's, he played Australian rules football as a ruckman on the first XVIII from 1956 to 1959. He reportedly signed with the Richmond Football Club in 1959. Pell's ambitions later turned to the priesthood. Speaking of his decision to enter seminary, Pell once said, "To put it crudely, I feared and suspected and eventually became convinced that God wanted me to do His work, and I was never able to successfully escape that conviction."

In 1960, Pell began his studies for the priesthood at Corpus Christi College, then located in Werribee. (Note: One of his fellow seminarians at Corpus Christi was Denis Hart, Pell's successor as Archbishop of Melbourne.) He continued to play football and served as class prefect in his second and third years. In 1963, he was assigned to continue studies at the Pontifical Urban University in Rome. He was ordained to the diaconate on 15 August 1966.

== Ecclesiastical career ==
=== Priesthood ===
On 16 December 1966, Pell was ordained a priest by Cardinal Gregorio Pietro Agagianian at St. Peter's Basilica. He received a Licentiate of Sacred Theology degree from the Pontificia Università Urbaniana in 1967, and continued his studies at the University of Oxford where he earned a Doctor of Philosophy degree in church history in 1971 with a thesis entitled "The exercise of authority in early Christianity from about 170 to about 270". During his studies at Oxford he also served as a chaplain to Catholic students at Eton College.

In 1971, Pell returned to Australia and was assigned to serve as an assistant priest in Swan Hill, where he remained for two years. He then served at a parish in Ballarat East from 1973 to 1983, becoming administrator of the parish of Bungaree in 1984. In 1982, he earned a Master of Education degree from Monash University in Melbourne. During his tenure in Ballarat East and Bungaree, he also served as Episcopal Vicar for Education (1973–84), director of the Aquinas campus of the Institute of Catholic Education (1974–84) and principal of the Institute of Catholic Education (1981–84). He was also editor of Light, the newspaper of the Diocese of Ballarat, from 1979 to 1984.

From 1985 to 1987, Pell served as seminary rector of his alma mater, Corpus Christi College.

=== Diocesan episcopal career ===
Pell was appointed an auxiliary bishop of Melbourne and titular bishop of the Roman Catholic Diocese of Scala (Italy) on 30 March 1987. He received his episcopal consecration on 21 May 1987 from Archbishop Frank Little, with bishops Ronald Mulkearns and Joseph O'Connell serving as co-consecrators. He served as Bishop for the Southern Region of Melbourne (1987–96). During this time, he was a parish priest in Mentone.

Pell was named seventh Archbishop of Melbourne on 16 July 1996, receiving the pallium from Pope John Paul II on 29 June 1997. He was later appointed eighth Archbishop of Sydney on 26 March 2001 and again received the pallium from John Paul on 29 June 2001.

Pell was a consultor of the Pontifical Council for Justice and Peace from 1990 to 1995 and a member from 2002. From 1990 to 2000 he was a member of the Congregation for the Doctrine of the Faith. In April 2002, John Paul II named him President of the Vox Clara commission to advise the Congregation for Divine Worship on English translations of liturgical texts. On 21 December 2002 he was appointed a member of the Pontifical Council for the Family, having previously served as a consultor to the council. On 22 September 2012, Pell was appointed a member of the Congregation for Bishops.

As Archbishop of Melbourne, Pell maintained a high public profile on a wide range of issues, while retaining a strict adherence to Catholic orthodoxy; with some dispute over the issue of Catholics and primacy of conscience.

In 2001, he argued: "We must not allow the situation to deteriorate as it had in Elijah's time, 850 years before Christ, where monotheism was nearly swamped by the aggressive paganism of the followers of Baal." In 2010, on reviewing the movie Avatar, he wrote: "Worship of the powerful forces of nature is half right, a primitive stage in the movement towards acknowledging the one: the single Transcendent God, above and beyond nature. It is a symptom of our age that Hollywood is pumping out this old-fashioned pagan propaganda."

Pope John Paul II announced on 28 September 2003 that he would appoint Pell and 28 others to the College of Cardinals. In the consistory of 21 October he was made cardinal priest of Santa Maria Domenica Mazzarello. With Pell as cardinal, Australia had, for the first time, three cardinals eligible to participate in a papal election: Pell, Edward Bede Clancy and Edward Idris Cassidy.

Pell was one of the cardinal electors in 2005 who participated in the 2005 papal conclave that elected Cardinal Joseph Ratzinger, who became Pope Benedict XVI. He is reported to have served as an unauthorised "campaign manager" for Ratzinger. Pell was mentioned as a possible successor to Benedict XVI as head of the Congregation for the Doctrine of the Faith.

Pell instituted new guidelines in February 2007 for family members speaking at funerals. He said that, "on not a few occasions, inappropriate remarks glossing over the deceased's proclivities (drinking prowess, romantic conquests etc) or about the church (attacking its moral teachings) have been made at funeral Masses." Under Pell's guidelines, the eulogy must never replace the celebrant's homily, which should focus on the scripture readings selected, God's compassion, and the resurrection of Jesus.

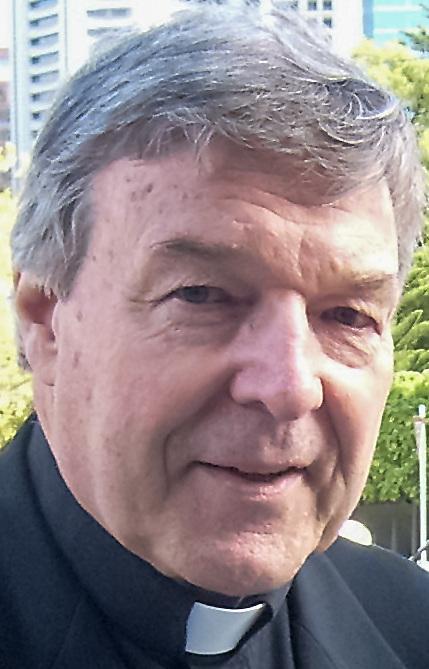
Pell in 2008

Pell lobbied for the successful Sydney bid to host the 2008 World Youth Day, which brought Benedict XVI on his first papal visit to Australia. The event drew approximately half a million young people from 200 countries, and one million people came to see the Pope. On 19 July 2008, Benedict issued his first public apology to victims of child sexual abuse by Catholic priests.

In their 2010 Good Friday sermons, both Pell and his Anglican counterpart Archbishop Peter Jensen attacked atheism. Both men were also closely aligned on policy issues and Jensen launched Pell's biography.

On 18 September 2012, Pell was named by Benedict XVI to be one of the papally appointed Synod Fathers for the October 2012 Ordinary General Assembly of the Synod of Bishops on the New Evangelization.

Pell was the only cardinal from Oceania to take part in the 2013 papal conclave. At that conclave, he was thought to be organising votes on behalf of Cardinal Angelo Scola of Milan, the favourite candidate of the Italian cardinals.

Following his election, Pope Francis named Pell, the only non-retired cardinal available to represent Oceania, one of eight members to advise the Pope on reform of the Vatican bureaucracy, called the Roman Curia; they were appointed to five-year terms.

=== Secretariat for the Economy ===
In February 2014, Pell was appointed to be the first prefect of the newly created Secretariat for the Economy. In this role, Pell was responsible for the annual budget of the Holy See and the Vatican. In July 2014 Pell, with the consent of Pope Francis, had the Ordinary Section of Administration of the Patrimony of the Apostolic See (APSA) transferred to the Secretariat for the Economy to enable the Secretariat to exercise economic control and vigilance over the agencies of the Holy See. It was also announced that remaining staff of APSA would begin to focus exclusively on its role as a treasury for the Holy See and the Vatican City State.

Following the confirmation of the mission of the Institute for the Works of Religion (IOR – also known as the Vatican Bank) by the Pope on 7 April 2014, the IOR announced plans for the next stage of development. The Council of Cardinal Advisers, the Secretariat for the Economy, the Supervisory Commission of Cardinals, and the IOR Board of Superintendence agreed that this plan would be carried out by a new executive team led by Jean-Baptiste de Franssu.

Pell was appointed a member of the Congregation for the Evangelization of Peoples on 13 September 2014. In November 2014, the Secretariat for the Economy distributed a new handbook to all Vatican offices outlining financial management policies that would go into effect on 1 January 2015. The manual was endorsed by the Council for the Economy and approved by the Pope. "The purpose of the manual is very simple," said Pell, "it brings Financial Management practices in line with international standards and will help all Entities and Administrations of the Holy See and the Vatican City State prepare financial reports in a consistent and transparent manner." In 2015, Cardinal Francesco Coccopalmerio questioned the scope of the authority given to the Secretariat and to Pell himself, specifically the consolidation of management and not the demand for transparency.

On 12 December 2018, the Vatican announced that Pell was one of three "more elderly" cardinals who were to leave the Pope's Council of Cardinal Advisers after a five-year term. The three were also thanked by the Pope for their service. On 24 February 2019, his five-year term as Prefect of the Secretariat for the Economy expired.

=== Vatican investigation of sexual abuse charges ===
Immediately following Pell's initial conviction for sexual abuse in February 2019, the Holy See's Congregation for the Doctrine of the Faith (CDF) initiated its own investigation of the charges against him, (Note: The CDF has had jurisdiction over sexual offences committed by the Catholic clergy with minors since 2001. Its proceedings are secret.) but the Vatican also said the CDF would await a "definitive judgment" from the Australian courts in the case. The Pope reaffirmed at that time that Pell was "forbidden to exercise public ministry and ... from having contact in any way or form with minors", restrictions that had been in place since Pell's return to Australia in July 2017. When Pell's conviction was upheld in August 2019, the Vatican again said its review would wait for Pell to exhaust his appeals. When Pell's convictions were quashed in April 2020, a Vatican spokesperson said that ruling would contribute to the CDF's investigation which would "draw its conclusions on the basis of the norms of canon law". The CDF's investigations concluded upon Pell's acquittal by the High Court.

=== Illness and death ===
In January 2010, Pell experienced cardiac problems during his Vatican visit, and in February had a pacemaker fitted in a Rome hospital. In 2015, Pell's doctors judged his heart condition serious enough to prevent air travel from Italy to Australia to appear before the Royal Commission into Institutional Responses to Child Sexual Abuse. He was expected to be well enough to travel in February 2016. However, he was excused from giving evidence in person by commission chair Justice Peter McClellan, based on a two-page medical report submitted by Pell's lawyers. He testified from a hotel in Rome through a video link up. In December 2018, he underwent knee surgery. He recovered sufficiently to stop using a cane by June 2019. In February 2019, when he was taken into custody following his conviction, an assessment of his mental and physical health concluded he was healthy enough to be kept in HM Melbourne Assessment Prison.

On 10 January 2023, at the age of 81, Pell died of cardiac arrest following hip surgery at the Salvator Mundi hospital in Rome, having attended the funeral of Pope Benedict XVI a few days earlier. For the last two years and three months of his life, Pell lived in Rome, taking up residency in an apartment one block away from the Vatican. His body lay in state at the Church of St Stephen of the Abyssinians before a Requiem Mass at St. Peter's Basilica on 14 January, which was celebrated by Giovanni Battista Re, Dean of the College of Cardinals, and concelebrated by other cardinals and bishops, with the final blessing and commendation given by Pope Francis. Pell's Funeral Mass was celebrated at St Mary's Cathedral in Sydney on 1 February during a closed service which was held amid protest concerns. He was buried in the cathedral's crypt. Leading public figures who attended the funeral service included former prime ministers Tony Abbott and John Howard, and federal opposition leader Peter Dutton. However, other leading public figures did not attend: Governor-General David Hurley, Prime Minister Anthony Albanese, NSW Governor Margaret Beazley, NSW Premier Dominic Perrottet, NSW opposition leader Chris Minns and Lord Mayor of Sydney Clover Moore. LGBT groups, survivors of child sexual abuse and their supporters protested in Hyde Park, opposite the cathedral.

== Views ==
In the Australian context, Pell was regarded as progressive on some issues such as asylum seekers but strongly conservative on matters of faith and morals. He was often wary of what he called the "callousness" of unrestrained capitalism. He wrote that a Catholic is someone who is not only a person of personal conscience but "is someone who believes Christ is Son of God, accepts His teachings and lives a life of worship, service and duty in the community. Catholics are not created by the accident of birth to remain only because their tribe has an interesting history."

=== Theology and worship ===
==== Ad orientem liturgy ====
In 2009 Pell supported, in the abstract but not as a proposal for immediate application, mandatory celebration of the Canon of the Mass with the orientation of the priest ad orientem (towards the east), facing in the same direction as the congregation. "There's nothing like a consensus in favour of that at the moment", he said. "I think I would be in favour of it because it makes it patently clear that the priest is not the centre of the show, that this is an act of worship of the one true God, and the people are joining with the priest for that."

==== Adam and Eve ====
During a debate against Richard Dawkins on the television show Q&A in 2012, in response to whether there had ever been a Garden of Eden scenario with an "actual" Adam and Eve, Pell said:

Adam and Eve are terms – what do they mean: life and earth. It's like every man. That's a beautiful, sophisticated, mythological account. It's not science but it's there to tell us two or three things. First of all that God created the world and the universe. Secondly, that the key to the whole of universe, the really significant thing, are humans and, thirdly, it is a very sophisticated mythology to try to explain the evil and suffering in the world.

==== Ordination of women and priestly celibacy ====
In 2005 Pell supported the view that the ordination of women as priests is impossible according to the church's divine constitution and said that abandoning the tradition of clerical celibacy would be a "serious blunder".

=== Pope Benedict XVI ===
Pell said that the decision of Pope Benedict XVI to retire in 2013 could set a precedent which may be a problem for future leaders. He thought Benedict's decision to step down had destabilised the church and some of those surrounding the Pope had failed to support him in his ministry. "He was well aware that this is a break with tradition [and] slightly destabilising", Pell said. According to him, the Pope was a better theologian than he was a leader.

In response to the statement that he had criticised Benedict XVI, Pell said he was stating what the Pope already mentioned himself, and his comments were "not breaking any ground". During a youth conference in Parramatta, Bishop Anthony Fisher said that Pell was merely "stating the pros and cons of the Pope's decision" and those who said his comments were critical were taking him out of context.

=== Pope Francis ===
In the days following his death, it was revealed that Pell had been the author of a memo published in 2022 on the blog Settimo Cielo under the pseudonym of "Demos", in which Pell expressed harsh criticisms of Pope Francis and labelled his pontificate as "a disaster in many or most respects; a catastrophe". Pell accused Francis of failing to stand up to the Chinese Communist Party, of failing to lend sufficient support to Ukraine and the Ukrainian Greek Catholic Church and for not doing enough to stop the Catholic Church in Germany from questioning traditional doctrines on LGBT issues and women's ordination. The person who had revealed Demos' identity, Sandro Magister, who was also the memo's publisher, said that Pell had allowed him to reveal he was Demos after his death.

In an article he wrote for The Spectator, published shortly after his death, Pell described Pope Francis' Synod on the Synod as a "toxic nightmare".

=== Political issues ===
==== Asylum seekers and refugees ====
Pell criticised the bipartisan policy of mandatory detention of asylum seekers in Australia and called for "empathy and compassion" towards displaced peoples. Pell said that while a policy of deterrence was justifiable, the practice of the policy was coming at too great a "moral cost". Describing conditions in some of Australia's mandatory detention camps in 2001 as "pretty tight and miserable" and "no place for women and children", Pell called for investigation of any maltreatment of detainees and said that, while Australia has the right to regulate the number of refugees it accepts, as a rich and prosperous country, it can "afford to be generous" and must treat humanely those refugees who reach Australia.

=== Environmental positions ===
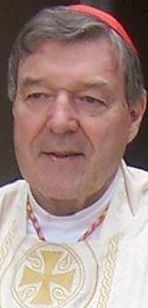
Pell in 2006

In a 2006 speech, Pell said that "hysterical and extreme claims" about the natural environment were the result of the "pagan emptiness" of Western culture. He said: "In the past pagans sacrificed animals and even humans in vain attempts to placate capricious and cruel gods. Today they demand a reduction in carbon dioxide emissions." In a 2007 article for the Sydney Sunday Telegraph, Pell wrote that while climate had changed, he was "certainly sceptical about extravagant claims of impending man-made climatic catastrophes, because the evidence is insufficient".

Responding to the Anglican bishop and environmentalist George Browning, who told the Anglican Church of Australia's general synod that Pell was out of touch with the Catholic Church as well as with the general community, Pell stated:

Radical environmentalists are more than up to the task of moralising their own agenda and imposing it on people through fear. They don't need church leaders to help them with this, although it is a very effective way of further muting Christian witness. Church leaders in particular should be allergic to nonsense ... I am certainly sceptical about extravagant claims of impending man-made climatic catastrophes. Uncertainties on climate change abound ... my task as a Christian leader is to engage with reality, to contribute to debate on important issues, to open people's minds, and to point out when the emperor is wearing few or no clothes.

In July 2015, Pell criticised Pope Francis's encyclical Laudato si' for associating the church with the need to address climate. Pell said:

It's got many, many interesting elements. There are parts of it which are beautiful. But the church has no particular expertise in science ... the church has got no mandate from the Lord to pronounce on scientific matters. We believe in the autonomy of science.

Pell publicly expressed concern regarding population decline in July 2008 in a homily for the opening Mass of the World Youth Day in Sydney, in response to comments made by Pope Benedict XVI regarding climate change. While travelling to Sydney for the event, Benedict stated in a brief interview that Catholics and others must commit "to finding an ethical way to change our way of life and ways to respond to these great challenges" regarding climate change. Pell stated in his homily that mankind has a duty not "to damage and destroy or ruthlessly use the environment at the expense of future generations", but expressed scepticism regarding human activity causing climate change. Pell stated that the "slowing population growth and apathy towards God are the biggest challenges facing the church" and that Western nations faced a population crisis fuelled by "ruthless commercial forces", such that "No western country is producing enough babies to keep the population stable, no western country." Pell's views were contested in the Australian context by the environmental group Sustainable Population Australia, whose media release of 14 July 2008 cited Australian Bureau of Statistics figures that Australia had "a population growth rate of 1.6%, higher than the global average, with twice as many births as deaths...". Pell's views were contested in a global context by the economist Jeffrey Sachs, who argued that "The planet, everyone can feel, is just right at the limits right now in terms of food, in terms of energy supply, in terms of land use." Sachs also suggested that world population projections "are already too high at around an extra 2.5 billion people by 2050".

=== Interfaith issues ===
==== Islam ====
Pell wrote of a need to "deepen friendship and understanding" with Muslims in the post–September 11 environment and said that though there is a continuing struggle throughout the Muslim world between moderates and men of violence, he believed that, in Australia, "the moderates are in control". In 2004, speaking to the Acton Institute on the problems of "secular democracy", Pell drew a parallel between Islam and communism: "Islam may provide in the 21st century, the attraction that communism provided in the 20th, both for those that are alienated and embittered on the one hand and for those who seek order or justice on the other."

In February 2006, addressing Catholic business leaders in Naples, Florida, Pell stated: "Considered strictly on its own terms, Islam is not a tolerant religion and its capacity for far-reaching renovation is severely limited." He doubted that Islam possesses the capacity for theological development because "In the Muslim understanding, the Koran comes directly from God, unmediated. The Bible, in contrast, is a product of human co-operation with divine inspiration." In 2012 and 2013, Pell hosted Iftar dinners to mark the end of the Islamic celebration of Ramadan. The Grand Mufti of Australia, Ibrahim Abu Mohamed, expressed his gratitude and appreciation to Pell on behalf of Muslims for hosting the dinner. Pell said during the 2012 dinner that such gatherings are one of the fruits of tolerance that flourishes in Australian society and is a sign of respect for diversity, stating:

We are all called to be instruments of peace and harmony among aggressors and those who practice terrorism although we worship the one God in different ways... We gather united in our plans for respect and friendship.

==== Judaism ====
Pell participated in interfaith dialogues and celebrations involving Jews. In 2001, he told one such audience at Mandelbaum House in Sydney that he had come from a strongly pro-Jewish family and of being saddened during his studies of history to find Christian ill-treatment of Jews. Pell spoke of the need to remember the Holocaust and of his visits to concentration camps and of his support for the right of the state of Israel to exist. He praised the role of Vatican II and of Pope John Paul II in advancing the cause of Christian-Jewish dialogue and co-operation. Pell also spoke in praise of the Jewish psalms as "a body of prayerful literature" unequalled in any other tradition and singled out the Jewish prophets, Isaiah, Jeremiah and Ezekiel as authors for whom he has a deep love, and Elijah as one whom he views as highly significant. Pell called on Christian and Jewish leaders alike to speak together and respectfully listen to each other, saying of the Christian-Jewish relationship:

During the last 30 or 40 years there has been a significant reduction in the amount of Christian anti-Semitism. We thank God for that. To adapt to our circumstances the word of Martin Luther King "we are caught in an inescapable network of mutuality. Whatever affects one directly affects all indirectly". Our fortunes, as brothers, are inextricably linked.

Pell's remarks to Richard Dawkins led to a clarification from his office, reported by The Times of Israel as an apology. Pell said, "My commitment to friendship with the Jewish community, and my esteem for the Jewish faith is a matter of public record, and the last thing I would want to do is give offence to either" and that the Holocaust was "a crime unique in history for the death and suffering it caused and its diabolical attempt to wipe out an entire people."

=== Sexuality, marriage and bioethics ===
Pell received much attention for his attitudes to sexuality issues, particularly homosexuality. When installed as Archbishop of Sydney in May 2001, he said that "Christian teaching on sexuality is only one part of the Ten Commandments, of the virtues and vices, but it is essential for human wellbeing and especially for the proper flourishing of marriages and families, for the continuity of the human race."

==== Divorce and remarriage ====
Pell said that, outside exceptional circumstances such as relationships involving physical abuse, it is better for individuals and for society if couples do not divorce, particularly where children are involved. In 2001, ABC radio's The World Today reported that Pell wanted a return to a divorce system based on the fault of one spouse. Pell told the program that, in an effort to "focus attention on the damage, personal and financial, that unfortunately often follows from divorce", he had prepared a list for public consideration of possible penalties to discourage divorce (particularly where fault by one party was involved) as well as benefits to support couples who stayed together.

==== LGBT issues ====
In 1990, Pell stated publicly that while he recognised that homosexuality existed, such activity was nevertheless wrong and "for the good of society it should not be encouraged." He had also expressed his belief that suicide rates among LGBT youth were a reason to discourage homosexuality, arguing that "Homosexual activity is a much greater health hazard than smoking." In 1998, Pell refused communion to members of the Rainbow Sash Movement who had attended Mass at the cathedral in Melbourne. He publicly rebuked their actions to the applause of other parishioners. Pell opposed Australian legislation in 2006 that would have permitted LGBT couples to adopt children. In 2007, he said that discrimination against LGBT people was not comparable to that against racial minorities.

==== HIV/AIDS ====
In 2009, Pell supported the comments made by Pope Benedict XVI in Africa in relation to controlling the spread of AIDS, in which the Pope reiterated the Catholic teaching that the solution to the AIDS epidemic lay not in the distribution of condoms, but in the practice of sexual abstinence and monogamy within marriage. The Pope said that AIDS could not be overcome through the distribution of condoms, which "can even increase the problem". In response to global coverage of these remarks, Pell said that AIDS was a "great spiritual and health crisis" and a huge challenge, but that "Condoms are encouraging promiscuity. They are encouraging irresponsibility."

The idea that you can solve a great spiritual and health crisis like AIDS with a few mechanical contraptions like condoms is ridiculous. If you look at the Philippines you'll see the incidence of AIDS is much lower than it is in Thailand, which is awash with condoms. There are condoms everywhere and the rate of infection is enormous.

The president of the AIDS Council of New South Wales, Marc Orr, said Pell's comments were "irresponsible" and "contradicted all evidence" that condoms reduced the transmission of HIV: Mike Toole (Burnet Institute) and Rob Moodie (Nossal Institute for Global Health) wrote in The Age that Pell had said a health worker from an African country told him that "people in remote areas are too poor to afford condoms and the ones that are available are often of very poor quality and weren't used effectively". Both professors argue that "this is not an argument against promoting condoms – it is an argument that we need to ensure that good quality condoms are affordable for everyone and are widely distributed with information about how to use them effectively" and concluded "the sexual abstinence message is clearly not working."

In 2010, Benedict told an interviewer that while the church did not consider condoms as a "real or moral solution", there were times where the "intention of reducing the risk of infection" made condom use "a first step" towards a better way. Pell released a statement saying this did not signal a major new shift in Vatican thinking.

==== Stem cell research ====
Pell supported research on the therapeutic potential of adult stem cells but opposed embryonic stem cell research on the basis that the Catholic Church cannot support anything which involves "the destruction of human life at any stage after conception". Under Pell, the Sydney archdiocese has provided funding for adult stem cell research but has actively opposed moves by the Parliament of New South Wales to liberalise laws pertaining to use of embryonic stem cells.

Following a conscience vote in the Parliament of New South Wales overturning a ban on therapeutic cloning, in June 2007 Pell said that "Catholic politicians who vote for this legislation must realise that their voting has consequences for their place in the life of the Church." Some members of parliament, including ministers such as Kristina Keneally and Nathan Rees, condemned Pell's comments, calling them hypocritical; Rees drew comparisons with comments made earlier in the year by Sheik Hilali. Australian Greens MLC Lee Rhiannon referred Pell's remarks to the New South Wales parliamentary privileges committee for allegedly being in contempt of parliament. Pell described this move as a "clumsy attempt to curb religious freedom and freedom of speech". In September the committee tabled a report clearing him of this charge and recommending that no further action be taken.

The legal scholar and theologian Cathleen Kaveny wrote that "In every possible respect, Pell's statement backfired" as, following backlash from elected officials and the general public, the bill passed the lower house with what she describes as "an overwhelming 65–26 vote" and passed the upper house with a 27–13 vote.

== Other roles ==
The Roman Catholic Archbishop of Sydney takes the role of visitor of St John's College, a residential college within the University of Sydney.

Pell accepted the invitation to be patron of the Oxford University Newman Society and to deliver their inaugural St Thomas More Lecture on 6 March 2009.

== Handling of child sexual abuse cases by clergy while archbishop ==
Pell's tenure as Archbishop of Melbourne began when the issue of handling of child sex abuse allegations by institutions was coming to the fore in public debate. Launching the "Melbourne Response" protocol in 1996, Pell said: "It's a matter of regret that the Catholic Church has taken some time to come to grips with the sex abuse issue adequately." In his final sermon as Archbishop of Sydney in 2014 before departing Australia for Rome, Pell told the congregation: "I apologise once again to the victims and their families for the terrible suffering that has been brought to bear by these crimes." He said procedural improvements could still be made to the church's efforts against child sexual abuse, and then added that he "looked forward" to the findings of the Royal Commission into Institutional Responses to Child Sexual Abuse which he said was providing a "public service" in allowing victims to air their experiences. His choice of words drew wide criticism as they were perceived as being inappropriately blithe and unempathetic to the victims of abuse.

=== "Melbourne Response" protocol for abuse cases ===
Shortly after becoming Archbishop of Melbourne in August 1996, Pell discussed the issue of child abuse with the Victorian premier as well as the governor and the retired judge Richard McGarvie, who all recommended swift action. He engaged the law firm Corrs to draft a scheme which would be funded by but operate independently of the Archdiocese of Melbourne. A public forum was held on 19 October and the resulting "Melbourne Response" was announced on 30 October 1996. Victims were publicly encouraged to come forward. Pell's Melbourne-specific policy preceded the national church response, known as "Towards Healing", which the Australian Catholic Bishops' Conference approved in November and took effect in March 1997. When Pell was appointed a cardinal in 2003, the Australian Broadcasting Corporation said that he had established Australia's first independent commissioner to handle child sexual abuse complaints against clergy.

The Melbourne Response was the subject of Case Study 16 in the 2013–2017 Royal Commission into Institutional Responses to Child Sexual Abuse and was also examined in the 2013 Victorian government Inquiry into the Handling of Child Abuse by Religious and Other Organisations. Pell was called to testify at both inquiries. In 2017, the royal commission reported that the Melbourne Response was "widely criticised as being legalistic and offering inadequate support to victims". According to the royal commission, the Melbourne Response set its goals as "truth, humility, healing for the victims, assistance to other persons affected, an adequate response to those accused and to offenders and the prevention of any such offences in the future". Its key features were the appointment of independent commissioners to inquire into allegations and make recommendations; a counselling and support service (Carelink); and the establishment of a compensation panel to advise on making ex-gratia payments to victims of child sexual abuse. The payments are made without the church recognising any liability to victims and were initially capped at $50,000. It was increased to $55,000 in 2000 and to $75,000 in 2008. Peter O'Callaghan was appointed the first independent commissioner. He went on to investigate 351 complaints of child sexual abuse and upheld 97% of them.

=== 2013 Victorian parliamentary inquiry ===
On 27 May 2013, Pell gave evidence before Victoria's Parliamentary Inquiry into the Handling of Child Abuse by Religious and Other Organisations. Pell told the inquiry that he was "fully apologetic and absolutely sorry". The parliamentarians questioned Pell over allegations from the parents of a victim that he had not shown them empathy. Pell said he had in fact fully understood the suffering. He agreed with the inquiry that his predecessor had "covered up" matters for fear of scandal. Pell was heckled from the gallery. Pell critic David Marr wrote that "He [Pell] admitted his church had covered up child sexual abuse for fear of scandal; that his predecessor Archbishop Little had destroyed records, moved paedophile priests from parish to parish and facilitated appalling crimes." During the course of the inquiry, a victim of a paedophile Christian Brother at St Alipius Primary School said that in 1969 Pell heard him pleading for help a few weeks after he had been raped. Pell denied the statement, which NewsCorp outlets later claimed to have been discredited saying Pell had shown his passport to NewsCorp paper the Herald Sun to prove he was not living in Australia that year.

=== Response to historic allegations in Sydney ===
During Pell's time as Archbishop of Sydney, allegations of child sexual abuse were made against around 55 priests in the archdiocese. These were largely related to incidents that occurred prior to his arrival as archbishop. The allegations resulted in just under $8 million in reparation payments.

=== Royal Commission into Institutional Responses to Child Sexual Abuse ===
In late 2012, the Australian federal government established a Royal Commission into Institutional Responses to Child Sexual Abuse. Pell welcomed the inquiry and said "We think this is an opportunity to help the victims, it's an opportunity to clear the air and separate fact from fiction." He said there had been a persistent "press campaign against the Catholic Church". The commission conducted hearings between 2013 and 2017. Pell gave evidence on three occasions to the royal commission, beginning in March 2014 in Sydney and via video link from the Vatican in August 2014 and in February/March 2016.

In his 2012 Christmas address Pell said he felt "shock and shame" at revelations of crime and wrongdoing that were completely contrary to Christ's teaching. Pell called the crimes and wrongdoings "disasters". He said he was "deeply sorry this has happened" and told his listeners to "help those who have been hurt".

==== Comments upholding the Seal of Confession ====
The announcement of the royal commission was accompanied by calls from some quarters for relaxing the requirement of confidentiality in confessions, known as the Seal of Confession, which has been upheld by the Catholic Church since the 5th century. It is protected under Australian law in such statutes as the Evidence Act 1995 (which also provides protections for lawyers, journalists and spouses). When Pell was asked whether he thought that a priest who hears the confession of someone who has committed child sex abuse must remain bound by the Seal of Confession, he replied:

If that is done outside the confessional (it can be reported to the police) ... (But) the Seal of Confession is inviolable. If the priest knows beforehand about such a situation, the priest should refuse to hear the confession ... That would be my advice, and I would never hear the confession of a priest who is suspected of such a thing.

The ABC reported that the comment "met with disapproval", citing Catholic politician Barry O'Farrell who told Parliament that confessions should not be secret.

==== Accusations of misconduct ====
Criticisms of Pell's conduct and manner towards victims and perpetrators have been aired in the Australian media and considered at the royal commission. His appearances before the royal commission were met with intense public interest in Australia. He was heckled from the public galleries. Pell has complained of unfair treatment from the media and "relentless character assassination".

An SBS article by Debi Marshall included suggestions Pell had ignored accounts of physical and child sexual abuse and covered up such abuse. Marshall raised the allegation that Pell had attempted to "bribe" a victim. However, Pell was cross-examined by Counsel Assisting Gail Furness over the widely publicised statement that in 1993, he attempted to bribe David Ridsdale into silence when Ridsdale called him about the historical misconduct of his child-molesting priest uncle Gerald Ridsdale. In her final submission, Furness conceded that the allegation was unlikely to be an accurate interpretation of Pell's intent, as it was already known that Gerald Ridsdale was under investigation by police, and David Ridsdale was requesting a private process and not suggesting he wanted to go to police.

The royal commission also considered evidence of Pell's "knowledge of rumours, allegations or complaints of Edward Dowlan's sexual abuse of children in Ballarat", also raised in Marshall's article. One witness said he had gone to "Pell's presbytery" in Ballarat to warn him about Dowlan. Pell submitted evidence that he did not live in Ballarat or in that presbytery at the time, and the counsel-assisting said in her final submission that "Cardinal Pell's evidence about his living arrangements and duties in 1973 and 1974 make it less likely that he was at St Patrick's presbytery late in the afternoon on a week day."

==== March 2014 appearance ====
In 2014, the royal commission was told how lawyers representing Pell and the Archdiocese of Sydney incurred costs of A$1.5 million against a victim of child sexual abuse. The lawyers, acting on the church's instructions, "vigorously" fought John Ellis through the courts despite warnings of his "fragile psychological state". The resulting New South Wales Court of Appeal ruling established the controversial "Ellis Defence", which confirmed that the church could not be sued as a legal entity and held liable for child sexual abuse committed by a priest in such matters. Eventually, Ellis received $568,000 from the church. In a statement to the royal commission in March 2014, Pell reversed his earlier stance in support of the defence, saying: "My own view is that the Church in Australia should be able to be sued in cases of this kind."

In his 2014 appearance, Pell used an analogy of a trucking company: "If the truck driver picks up some lady and then molests her, I don't think it's appropriate, because it is contrary to the policy, for the ownership, the leadership of that company to be held responsible." He was widely criticised for this remark. The president of Adults Surviving Child Abuse, Cathy Kezelman, called his comments "outrageous", saying that they denied the experience of victims. Nicky Davis, from the Survivors Network of those Abused by Priests (SNAP), said that Pell had made a "highly offensive" comparison. Michael Bradley, writing in his weekly column for ABC News, said "Yes, it was mind-blowingly insensitive to draw that analogy and to so blithely refer to 'some lady'. But there was a much bigger hole. In the world according to Pell, if the Catholic Church has a policy that tells its priests not to rape children then, if they still do so, the Church cannot be held accountable."

==== 2016 appearance ====
Pell appeared before the Royal Commission in February and March 2016 by video link from a hotel in Rome because his heart condition made travel to Australia inadvisable, according to Commission chair Justice Peter McClellan, who ruled on the issue, a ruling opposed by Nicky Davis, an advocate for sexual abuse survivors. "Paul O'Dwyer SC, a counsel for abuse survivors, renewed his application for the Cardinal's medical records to be made public." After the announcement that Pell would testify from Rome in 2016, a GoFundMe campaign was launched to fund a trip to Rome by 15 victims of child sexual abuse to see Pell give evidence in person. It reached its target of A$55,000 in one day, doubled that the following day and trebled the day after. Comedian and musician Tim Minchin wrote and recorded the strongly-worded song "Come Home (Cardinal Pell)", with all proceeds to go to the gofundme campaign. Within 24 hours it had over 400,000 views on YouTube and became the number one position on the iTunes song chart in Australia. In the event, Pell's testimony was witnessed by 15 victims of child sexual abuse and their supporters.

Having sworn on the Bible, Pell stated that he did not think the problems with child sexual abuse were with the institutional structure of the Catholic Church. "The Church has made enormous mistakes and is working to remedy those", he said. "The Church in many places, certainly in Australia, has mucked things up, has let people down. I'm not here to defend the indefensible." Counsel assisting the royal commission alleged that there were also wider problems with the church's hierarchy in Australia and Rome and beyond, which they thought he understated or sidestepped. Regarding the allegations of children, he said that "the predisposition was not to believe" and that the instinct was to protect the church. He said: "Too many of them certainly were dismissed and sometimes they were dismissed in absolutely scandalous circumstances ... They were very, very, very plausible allegations made by responsible people that were not followed up sufficiently." Pell also stated that the way Gerald Ridsdale was dealt with was "a catastrophe for the victims and a catastrophe for the church". Referring to rumours of child sexual abuse he added: "in those days", he said, "if a priest denied such activity, I was very strongly inclined to accept the denial".

In June 2016 the Holy See Press Office director Federico Lombardi announced that Pell would continue in his role as prefect of the Secretariat for the Economy, despite being obliged to submit his resignation on turning 75. Lombardi reminded reporters that Pope Francis had previously expressed his full confidence in Pell, and that Francis wished him to continue as prefect.

==== Gerald Ridsdale ====
Pell served as an assistant priest at St Alipius' Church in Ballarat East and, in 1973, shared a house with Gerald Ridsdale, a priest who was later laicised and jailed for child sex crimes. Ridsdale was convicted between 1993 and 2017 of child sexual abuse and indecent assault charges against children aged as young as four years during the 1970s and 1980s, with the 79 known victims thought to be a small proportion of his actual total. Pell was part of a leadership group of priests in the Diocese of Ballarat who met during 1982 and discussed moving Ridsdale from the parish at Mortlake and sending him to Sydney. Pell denied knowing about any of Ridsdale's actions.

In March 2016, when asked by the royal commission why he had agreed to walk Ridsdale into the courthouse in Melbourne during his 1993 criminal trial, Pell responded, "I had some status as an auxiliary bishop and I was asked to appear with the ambition that this would lessen the term of punishment, lessen his time in jail." Peter Saunders, the victims' advocate and a former Catholic priest, said that Pell's response "demonstrates once again the callousness, the coldheartedness and the contempt that George Pell appears to display for this whole issue and particularly for the victims of these dreadful crimes".

In 2002 on 60 Minutes, David Ridsdale, a victim of child sexual abuse in Ballarat and a nephew of Gerald Ridsdale, accused Pell of attempting to bribe him in 1993 to prevent allegations of child sexual abuse being made public. The allegation was examined at the royal commission and received further wide publicity. However, Gail Furness, a counsel-assisting the royal commission, conceded in her final submission to the commission that, given it was already known to Pell that Gerald Ridsdale was subject to police investigation and that David Ridsdale had requested a "private" rather than police process, "it is not likely that Bishop Pell would then have thought it necessary to offer Mr Ridsdale an inducement to prevent him from going to the police or public with his allegations" and Ridsdale could have "misinterpreted Bishop Pell's offer of assistance".

==== Commission conclusions ====
On 7 May 2020, the royal commission revealed its findings regarding Pell, which had been made by 2017 but were withheld while Pell's own sexual abuse case was ongoing. concluding that Pell knew of child sexual abuse by clergy by the 1970s, but did not take adequate action to address it. Pell responded that the commission's views "are not supported by evidence".

For the case of Gerald Ridsdale, while Pell was a priest in Ballarat, the commission concluded that "in 1973 Father Pell turned his mind to the prudence of Ridsdale taking boys on overnight camps", with child sexual abuse "on his radar, in relation to" Ridsdale. The commission concluded that "by 1973, Cardinal Pell was not only conscious of child sexual abuse by clergy, but he also considered measures of avoiding situations which might provoke gossip about it".

For the case of Peter Searson, while Pell was an auxiliary bishop in Melbourne, the commission concluded that given the information Pell had in 1989, he "should have advised the Archbishop to remove Father Searson and he did not do so". Pell had told the commission that, in 1989, he received a list of grievances about Searson. The list included statements that Searson had harassed children, parents and school staff, used children's toilets without cause, shown children a dead body and practised animal cruelty. The commission concluded that it "ought to have been obvious" to Pell that he needed to have Searson removed, while rejecting Pell's statement that he had been "deceived" regarding Searson's case by education officials. Pell removed Searson in 1997 when he had become the archbishop.

For the case of Wilfred James Baker, while Pell was the Archbishop of Melbourne, the commission concluded that Pell had the power to remove Baker in August 1996 when he learned that Baker was about to be charged. Pell did not remove Baker then, resulting in Baker continuing as a priest in a parish with a primary school until May 1997. Baker was jailed in 1999 for child sexual abuse.

== Allegations of child sexual abuse ==
=== 2002 allegation ===
In June 2002, a Melbourne man named Phil Scott accused Pell of sexually abusing him at a Catholic youth camp in 1961, when the accuser was 12 years old and Pell was a young seminarian. Pell denied the accusations and stood aside while the inquiry continued. The complainant agreed to pursue his allegations through the church's own process for dealing with allegations of sexual misconduct, the National Committee for Professional Standards. Retired Victorian Supreme Court Justice Alec Southwell, appointed commissioner by the church to investigate the matter, found that the complainant, despite his long criminal record, had mostly given the impression of speaking honestly from actual recollection but concluded as follows: "bearing in mind the forensic difficulties of the defence occasioned by the very long delay, some valid criticism of the complainant's credibility, the lack of corroborative evidence and the sworn denial of the respondent, I find I am not 'satisfied that the complaint has been established'". Pell said he had been exonerated, while the complainant's solicitor said his client had been vindicated.

=== Victoria Police investigations ===
In March 2013, Victoria Police launched Operation Tethering to investigate whether Pell had committed an unreported crimes: without having received any complaints they advertised in newspapers for complainants finally succeeding in 2014.

On 20 February 2016, the Herald Sun newspaper reported that Pell had been under investigation for the past year by detectives from the Victoria Police SANO Taskforce over sexual abuse allegations involving between five and ten boys that occurred between 1978 and 2001 when he was a priest in Ballarat and when he was Archbishop of Melbourne. His office issued a statement denying the allegations, and asked for an inquiry into the leaking of information by Victoria Police officers. Victoria Police remained silent on whether Pell was being investigated. The SANO Taskforce was established in 2012 to investigate allegations arising from the Victorian Government's Inquiry into the Handling of Child Abuse by Religious and Other Organisations and the subsequent Royal Commission into Institutional Responses to Child Sexual Abuse.

On 28 July 2016, the Chief Commissioner of Victoria Police, Graham Ashton, confirmed that there was an investigation into alleged child sexual abuse by Pell, and stated he was awaiting advice from the Director of Public Prosecutions (DPP). On 17 August 2016, Victoria Police said a response had been received from the DPP, but would not disclose the DPP's recommendations.

In October 2016, three Victoria Police officers from the SANO Task Force flew to Rome to interview Pell, who participated voluntarily, regarding allegations of sexual assault. In February 2017, Victoria Police advised that the brief of evidence against Pell had been returned to the Office of Public Prosecutions. That office subsequently provided advice to Victoria Police in May 2017.

=== Trial, conviction and acquittal ===
The sequence of legal proceedings was:

- Melbourne Magistrates' Court: plea hearing
- Melbourne Magistrates' Court: committal hearing
- County Court of Victoria: directions hearing
- County Court of Victoria: "Swimmers trial"
  - Case withdrawn for insufficient evidence
- County Court of Victoria: "Cathedral trial" #1
  - Jury unable to reach verdict
- County Court of Victoria: "Cathedral trial" #2 (re-trial)
  - Guilty verdict
  - Pell incarcerated
  - Supreme Court of Victoria
    - Appeal not allowed
    - High Court of Australia
      - Appeal allowed. Conviction quashed. Pell released.

==== Initial charges and hearings ====
On 29 June 2017, Victoria Police announced they were charging Pell with a series of sexual assault offences with several counts and several victims. At a press conference in Rome, Pell denied the allegations. Pell left the Vatican in July and voluntarily returned to Australia to face trial. Details of the charges were not made public.

On 26 July 2017, Pell appeared at the Melbourne Magistrates' Court and entered a plea of not guilty. He was represented by barrister Robert Richter. An application by the media seeking public disclosure of the details of the charges was refused by the magistrate. At a procedural hearing in November, Pell's lawyers requested documents from ABC News journalist Louise Milligan and Melbourne University Press relating to Milligan's book Cardinal: the Rise and Fall of George Pell which was published in early 2017.

In the Ballarat case, in January 2018 one of the accusers Damian Dignan died after a long illness. Dignan's charge was withdrawn. Pell's lawyers requested but were denied the personal medical information of the complainants. Pell's defence was reported to be based on questioning the timing of allegations. Some other charges were dropped after a complainant was ruled medically unfit to give evidence.

The committal hearing to determine whether there was enough evidence to commit Pell to stand trial commenced on 5 March 2018. The hearing allowed for approximately fifty witnesses to give evidence, including former choirboys. The magistrate allowed Pell's barrister to cross-examine all but five witnesses. Pell's barrister said the allegations involving St Patrick's Cathedral were impossible.

Magistrate Belinda Wallington concluded that there was enough evidence for the case to proceed on about half of the charges. On 1 May 2018, Pell was committed to stand trial on several charges of sexual offending. Pell entered pleas of not guilty. As a bail condition, Pell was not permitted to leave Australia.

On 2 May 2018, Pell appeared in the County Court of Victoria for a directions hearing before Judge Sue Pullen. It was agreed that he would undergo two separate trials with two separate juries and that the charges would be heard separately for each trial. He was to be tried in relation to allegations of sexual offences taking place at St Patrick's Cathedral, Melbourne, in 1990 in the first case (the cathedral trial) and in relation to further allegations taking place at a Ballarat swimming pool in the 1970s in the second case (the swimmers trial). Prosecutors sought a media ban on reporting on the trials until the verdict in the second trial. A suppression order was subsequently issued by Chief Judge Peter Kidd on 25 June 2018. The purpose of the order was to prevent prejudice to Pell caused by jurors in the swimmers trial knowing the outcome of the cathedral trial.

==== Cathedral trials ====
===== First trial =====
Pell's first trial for the allegations of misconduct in St Patrick's Cathedral began in August 2018 under Chief Judge Kidd with representation by Robert Richter. However, it ended with the jury unable to reach a unanimous verdict. This necessitated a retrial, with another jury.

===== Re-trial =====
A retrial was conducted, again under Kidd. On 11 December 2018, Pell was convicted on five counts of child sexual abuse of two boys in the 1990s.

Australian media outlets generally respected the suppression order preventing publication of details on the cathedral trial whereas international news sources reported the conviction. The Melbourne-based Herald Sun posted on its front page "CENSORED" in large print in protest of the ban, noting that international sources were reporting on a "very important story that is relevant to Victorians". In a statement made to The Washington Post, Noah Shachtman, editor-in-chief of the online news magazine The Daily Beast, consulted with American and Australian lawyers but ultimately considered it an "easy call" to report on the conviction, though he did place geo-blocking restrictions to prevent online access to the story from Australia. More than 140 international news reports were published within 24 hours. Pell's barrister informed Chief Judge Kidd that the guilty verdict was accessible on Wikipedia.

==== Swimmers trial: prosecution withdraws its case ====
At the time of Pell's conviction in the cathedral trial, a second trial was pending regarding unrelated allegations that he sexually assaulted two boys while throwing them in the air in a Ballarat swimming pool in the late 1970s. These allegations had been raised by the ABC, leading to a Victoria Police investigation; however, Victoria's Director of Public Prosecutions dropped the charges after Chief Judge Kidd on 22 February 2019 disallowed the prosecution's submission of evidence from complainants on the grounds that each piece of evidence was not sufficient. News of Pell's conviction was published in Australia on 26 February 2019 when the suppression order was lifted following the withdrawal.

==== Cathedral trial sentencing ====
At a pre-sentencing hearing on 27 February 2019, Pell's bail was revoked and he was taken into custody at the Melbourne Assessment Prison. Pell's lawyers released a statement that Pell maintained his innocence, and advised that an appeal had been filed on three grounds.

The sentencing hearing on 13 March 2019 was broadcast live to the public, with Chief Judge Kidd sentencing Pell to serve six years in jail with a non-parole period of three years and eight months. Pell was also registered as a sex offender. He served 404 days in prison, much of it in solitary confinement, before being acquitted.

=== Appeal ===
The Court of Appeal of the Supreme Court of Victoria heard pleadings for Pell being granted leave to appeal simultaneously with the appeal itself in June 2019. Pell was represented by Bret Walker SC. Three grounds of appeal were lodged: that the verdict was unreasonable, that permission to use in their closing address a visual aid prepared by the defence that illustrated the locations of people within the cathedral around the time of the first assault had been refused, and that Pell had not been arraigned in the presence of the jury as is required under standard criminal procedures in Victoria. Judgment was reserved, without setting a date to deliver the decision.

On 21 August 2019, the Court of Appeal issued its ruling, which upheld the convictions. The three-judge panel comprised Chief Justice Anne Ferguson, President of the Court of Appeal, Justice Chris Maxwell and Justice Mark Weinberg. On the first ground of appeal, that the verdict was unreasonable, the court granted leave to appeal but dismissed the appeal by a majority (2–1) decision. Ferguson and Maxwell dismissed the appeal. Ferguson stated that, for the appeal to succeed, the court needed to find that the jury must have had doubt as to the defendant's guilt, not merely that they could have had doubt. Weinberg issued a dissenting judgment and would have allowed the appeal on the first ground.

Whilst Ferguson and Maxwell stated that they did not experience a doubt in the case, Weinberg, the dissenting judge, likened the case to that of Lindy Chamberlain, which had seen wrongful conviction by a jury and appeal court based on faulty evidence. Weinberg wrote that the applicant should be acquitted on each charge.

The court unanimously refused leave to appeal on the second and third grounds.

=== Acquittal ===
In September 2019, Pell sought special leave to appeal to the High Court of Australia, the final court of appeal in Australia. Pell's lawyers submitted that Pell's conviction should be overturned on the basis that, in the face of exculpatory evidence, the Court of Appeal had relied on their belief in the complainant to eliminate doubt and uphold the conviction. The prosecution submission asserted that the appeal judgement had glossed over evidence that supported his conviction. The appeal was heard on 11 and 12 March 2020 by a full bench of seven justices.

On 7 April 2020, in a unanimous judgment, the High Court allowed the appeal, quashing Pell's convictions and determining that judgments of acquittal be entered in their place. The court agreed with Weinberg's judgment in the Court of Appeal, finding that the majority might have effectively reversed the burden of proof. The court found that the jury ought to have entertained a doubt as to the applicant's guilt, given that the prosecution had not attempted to rebut Pell's alibi witnesses. In their judgment, the judges said with respect to all five charges that, "Making full allowance for the advantages enjoyed by the jury, there is a significant possibility ... that an innocent person has been convicted."

=== Reactions after acquittal ===
==== Criticism of ABC's Pell coverage ====
Following Pell's acquittal, prior media coverage of his case came under intense scrutiny. Australia's national broadcaster, the Australian Broadcasting Corporation (ABC), was accused of sustained bias against Pell both before and during the trial and appeals. Pell said the ABC had betrayed the national interest in overwhelmingly presenting a single view of the case, and that he was a target because of his socially conservative views.

The ABC dismissed criticisms of its coverage and defended its pursuit of Pell as having been without fear or favour. After criticism that its documentary series Revelation (which presented Pell as guilty) had been timed to coincide with the High Court decision, the ABC denied rushing the program, but temporarily removed it from its digital platform to allow the producers to include reference to Pell's acquittal and subsequent release from Barwon Prison. The series was restored to ABC's digital platform and went on to win the Walkley Documentary Award. The ABC noted that Revelation had actually been pushed back several days due to Prime Minister Scott Morrison making a televised address to the nation regarding the COVID-19 outbreak.

==== Criticism of Victorian criminal justice system ====
Criticism of the conduct of Victoria Police, the DPP and the Court of Appeal judges resulted from the High Court verdict. Right-wing commentator Keith Windschuttle published a book, The Persecution of George Pell, arguing that Pell had faced a concerted campaign by Victorian police, judiciary and victims' advocates to convict him on flimsy evidence.

==== Criticism of the High Court's verdict ====
In response to support for the acquittal, legal scholar Jeremy Patrick wrote that it is for juries to decide if they accept evidence in whole or part, not judges. He pointed out that the acquittal did not happen because the High Court "heard stunning new exonerating evidence, had found an error in law by the trial judge on a crucial point, realised there was jury misconduct, or anything of that sort. Instead, it heard the exact same evidence and the exact same arguments that were made at trial, and simply reached a different conclusion than the jury on contested matters of fact and credibility." However, its conclusion was flawed by "[an] unquestioning belief in the defendant's witnesses, an illogical 'probabilistic' analysis of a discrete, unreplicable historical event, and an eager willingness to substitute their own opinion for the jury's verdict because it reached the 'wrong' outcome."

=== Media charges ===
In January 2021, the Supreme Court of Victoria heard charges against 27 media companies, reporters and editors with offences, mainly contempt of court, for their coverage of the Pell verdict by breaching the suppression order and the subjudice rule—even though no outlet had named Pell in their coverage, but rather had published protests at the suppression order. Twelve media companies—including the Herald Sun, the Courier Mail, the Sydney Morning Herald, The Age (which was fined $450,000), News Corp Australia (which was fined $400,000) and Nine Entertainment Co. (whose other newspapers were fined $162,000)—pleaded guilty to contempt of court and apologised. The companies were to receive fines and would pay $650,000 of the state's legal costs. In exchange for these guilty pleas, 15 charges against individual journalists were dropped.

Justice John Dixon found that the 12 organisations had usurped the role of the court; they had taken it upon themselves to determine where the balance ought to lie between Pell's right to a fair trial and the public's right to know. He did not accept their submission that their breach of the suppression order was an honest mistake. Rather, he found, in most cases the reporting demonstrated that the organisations disagreed with the suppression order and felt the media should not be restrained from reporting the outcome of the trial. Although media overseas had reported Pell's conviction, he thought that potential jury members for the second trial were likely to rely upon local media rather than an internet search and, in any case, overseas reporting did not affect the seriousness of Australian media's breach of the suppression order.

=== 2022 legal action ===
In 2022, the father of a schoolboy who was allegedly abused by Pell launched legal action against Pell and the Catholic Archdiocese of Melbourne. Following Pell's death, it was announced that the case would proceed, with the claim to be against the Melbourne archdiocese and Pell's estate. The Melbourne archdiocese sought to prevent the lawsuit by appealing first to the Supreme Court of Victoria, which in 2023 refused the appeal, and then to the High Court of Australia, which in 2024 allowed the lawsuit to proceed by refusing the plaintiff special leave to appeal.

=== National Redress Scheme findings ===
In 2025, the National Redress Scheme found that, when Pell was a priest in Ballarat in the 1970s, he had likely sexually abused two schoolboys. It was found "reasonably likely", a standard of proof lower than that in a criminal or civil court, that Pell had anally raped a boy aged nine in a school gymnasium and had genitally groped a boy aged eight during a game at a swimming pool. The Roman Catholic Diocese of Ballarat disputed the allegations. The Scheme granted the compensations sought: to the older victim $95,000 and to the younger $45,000.

== Writings ==
Pell wrote widely in religious and secular magazines, including journals and newspapers in Australia and overseas. He regularly spoke on television and radio.

- Pell, George (1972). The Sisters of St Joseph in Swan Hill 1922–72
- —— (1977). Bread, Stones or Fairy Floss: Religious Education Today (pamphlet). Melbourne: Australian Catholic Truth Society Publications.
- —— (1979). Are our secondary schools Catholic? (pamphlet). Melbourne: Australian Catholic Truth Society Publications.
- —— (1982). An Evaluation of the Goal of Moral Autonomy in the Theory and Practice of Lawrence Kohlberg (Master of Education thesis thesis). Clayton, Melbourne: Monash University. doi:10.4225/03/597eca733a8dc.
- —— (1988). Catholicism in Australia. Bundoora, Victoria: La Trobe University. ISBN 0731636864.
- —— (1992). Rerum Novarum – One Hundred Years Later. Boston University. ISBN 9780872701007.
- with Woods, Mary Helen (1996). Issues of Faith and Morals (paperback). Melbourne: Oxford University Press. ISBN 978-0-19-553978-3. For senior secondary classes and parish groups.
- —— (1999). Catholicism and the Architecture of Freedom. The Inaugural Acton Lecture on Religion and Freedom. St Leonards, Sydney: Centre for Independent Studies (Australia). p. 14. ISBN 978-1-86432-044-2. Archived from the original (oration) on 27 March 2019.
- —— (2004). Livingstone, Tess (ed.). Be not afraid: collected writing (paperback). Sydney: Duffy & Snellgrove. ISBN 978-1-876631-97-0. A collection of homilies and reflections.
- —— (2007). Casey, M. A. (ed.). God and Caesar: Selected Essays on Religion, Politics, and Society (paperback). Ballan, Victoria: Connor Court. ISBN 978-0-8132-1503-7.
- —— (2010). Livingstone, Tess (ed.). Test Everything: Hold Fast to What Is Good (paperback). Ballan, Victoria: Connor Court. ISBN 978-1-9214-2137-2.
- —— (2020). Prison Journal, Volume One: The Cardinal Makes His Appeal, 27 February–13 July 2019 (paperback). San Francisco: Ignatius Press. ISBN 9781621644484.
- —— (2021). Prison Journal, Volume Two: The State Court Rejects the Appeal, 14 July 2019–30 November 2019 (paperback). San Francisco: Ignatius Press. ISBN 9781621644507.
- —— (2021). Prison Journal, Volume Three: The High Court Frees an Innocent Man (paperback). San Francisco: Ignatius Press. ISBN 9781621644514.
- —— (2023). Robert A. Sirico (ed.). Pell Contra Mundum (in English, Italian, Spanish, and French). Oswald Gracias, Danny Casey, George Weigel. Connor Court. ISBN 9781922815743.

== Distinctions ==
=== Orders ===
- Holy See: Knight Grand Cross (2001) Grand Prior of the New South Wales Lieutenancy of the Order of the Holy Sepulchre (2001-2013), Grand Prior of the Australian Lieutenancy – Southern of the Order of the Holy Sepulchre (1998–2001)
- Australia: Companion of the Order of Australia (2005) for service to the Catholic Church in Australia and internationally, to raising debate on matters of an ethical and spiritual nature, to education and to social justice. (Note: On 21 August 2019, the Prime Minister of Australia, Scott Morrison, said that he plans to follow precedent and see that a recommendation is made to the Governor-General that this honour be revoked after Pell lost his appeal against his sexual abuse convictions. The Governor-General also issued a statement noting that such a conviction is grounds for termination of an appointment to the Order of Australia but also declaring that no action will be taken until the appeals process is completed.)

=== Awards ===
- Australia: Centenary Medal (2001) for service to Australian society through the Catholic Church.

=== Other ===
- Ecclesiastical Grand Cross and Ecclesiastical Grand Cross of Merit of the Malta-Paris obedience of the Order of Saint Lazarus (statuted 1910) (2003) for longstanding commitment to ecumenism, and service as National Chaplain (2001).

== See also ==
- Catholic sexual abuse scandal in Victoria
- St Mary's Cathedral, Sydney
- Sexual abuse cases in the Congregation of Christian Brothers

Catholic Church titles
Preceded by Marion Francis Forst	— TITULAR — Titular Bishop of Scala; 30 March 1987 – 16 July 1996	Succeeded by Edward Joseph Adams
Preceded by Frank Little	Archbishop of Melbourne; 16 July 1996 – 26 March 2001	Succeeded by Denis James Hart
Preceded by Edward Bede Clancy	Archbishop of Sydney; 26 March 2001 – 24 February 2014	Succeeded by Anthony Colin Fisher
Preceded by Ignacio Antonio Velasco García	Cardinal-Priest of Santa Maria Domenica Mazzarello; 21 October 2003 – 10 January 2023	Succeeded by Stephen Brislin
New dicastery	Prefect of the Secretariat for the Economy; 24 February 2014 – 24 February 2019	Succeeded by Juan Antonio Guerrero Alves
