= Secretariat for the Economy =

Department of the Roman Curia

The Secretariat for the Economy (Italian: Segreteria per l'economia) is a department of the Roman Curia with authority over all economic activities of the Holy See and the Vatican City State.

== Description ==
Pope Francis established the secretariat by a motu proprio, Fidelis dispensator et prudens, published on 24 February 2014. It is headed by a prefect–originally a cardinal–who reports directly to the Pope.

In the same motu proprio, the Pope also created the Council for the Economy to set policy guidelines for the secretariat and analyze its work. The council comprises eight cardinals or bishops and seven lay persons "with strong professional financial experience", chosen so that the body represents the global church. These members were named on 8 March 2014. Cardinal Reinhard Marx is the council's coordinator.

The Secretariat for the Economy is, after the Secretariat of State, the second department named a secretariat, an indication of its importance relative to other parts of the Curia.

The seat of the secretariat is in Saint John's Tower in the Vatican Gardens.

On 5 June 2022, as provided for in the apostolic constitution Praedicate evangelium, which took effect on the same day, the Prefect of the Secretariat for Economy notified the other Curial departments that he was creating a directorate for Human Resources within the Secretariat for Economy, to manage the human resources functions of the Roman Curia.

== History ==
Cardinal George Pell, Archbishop of Sydney, was named the secretariat's first Prefect and "asked to start work as soon as possible". Pell said he would begin work at the Vatican "by the end of March."

The Council for the Economy was first headed by a Cardinal Reinhard Marx as coordinator. On 5 June 2015, Pope Francis appointed Libero Milone as Auditor General.

A meeting of the Council for the Economy was held in September 2014 to discuss the statutes of the new secretariat. The council also discussed the transfer of responsibilities from the Administration of the Patrimony of the Apostolic See to the Secretariat for the Economy and the criteria for establishing a budgeting system.

On 3 March 2014, Pope Francis appointed Monsignor Alfred Xuereb as the first General Secretary of the Secretariat. Xuereb later left this post in February 2018. On 22 March, Pope Francis appointed Monsignor Brian Ferme, an Australian-born jurist and head of the St. Pius X Faculty of Canon Law in Venice, as the first Prelate Secretary of the Council that oversees the Secretariat.

In a motu proprio issued on 9 July 2014 the responsibilities of the Secretariat for the Economy were extended considerably, since it decreed that the Ordinary Section of the Administration of the Patrimony of the Apostolic See (APSA) is to be transferred to the Secretariat, giving the latter control over purchasing and human resources.

In April 2021, a motu proprio mandated that certain senior Vatican appointees provide transparent information regarding their personal finances.

Both the Secretariat for Economy and the Council for the Economy were given formal status in February 2015.

== Prefects ==
- George Pell (24 February 2014 – 24 February 2019), on leave of absence from 29 June 2017
- Juan Antonio Guerrero Alves SJ, (appointed 14 November 2019, effective 1 January 2020 – 30 November 2022)
- Maximino Caballero Ledo (appointed 30 November 2022, effective 1 December 2022 – present)

== See also ==
- Index of Vatican City-related articles
