= Meryl Sexton =

Australian judge

Judge Meryl Sexton

Judge of the County Court of Victoria
- Incumbent
- Assumed office 27 August 2001

Personal details
- Education: Presbyterian Ladies' College, Melbourne; Monash University
- Occupation: Judge, lawyer

Meryl Sexton is a judge of the County Court in Victoria, Australia, appointed in August 2001.

== Early life and education ==
Meryl Sexton attended Presbyterian Ladies' College, Melbourne. She graduated from Monash University with a Bachelor of Laws and Bachelor of Economics. She completed her articles at law firm Cody Dwyer & Associates and was admitted to practice law in 1984. Upon going to the Bar, her master was future County Court Judge Fred Davey.

== Career ==
Sexton specialised in criminal matters from 1985. She appeared for both prosecution and defence before being appointed Crown Prosecutor in 1995, and prosecuted several high-profile and complex cases, including notorious paedophile Michael Glennon.

She was appointed as a Judge of the County Court in 2001, and in October 2005 was appointed Judge in Charge of the Sex Offences List, a position she still holds.

Among her most noted cases are those of a priest who sexually assaulted children, an attack on West Indian cricketer Marlon Black, a trial following the largest ever hashish seizure in Victoria, the former manager of rock band Mi-Sex who had sex with an underage girl and a man who committed a rape on his buck's night.

Her highest-profile case has been the rape trial of Australian rules footballer Andrew Lovett, which began on 11 July 2011.

Sexton is heavily involved in legislative reform, particularly relating to sexual offences. She is a member of the Victorian Government's Sexual Assault Advisory Committee and was a member of the Victorian Law Reform Commission's Sexual Offences Reference Advisory committee. She is on the Council of the Victorian Institute of Forensic Medicine and part of the Advisory Committee for the Child Witness Service.

Sexton is also involved in legal education and has produced many articles and papers relating to sexual offences, particularly on those relating to changes to relevant legislation. In particular, "Changes to the Mental Element of Rape Twilight", "Propensity in Sexual Assault Cases" and an overview of The Crimes (Sexual Offences) Act 2006 are essential reading for practitioners.

== Other activities ==
Sexton was the first female to be made a life member of the Monash University hockey club. She is also involved in women's issues, as a member of the Equality Before the Law Committee and the Women Barristers Association, trustee of the Queen Victoria Women's Centre Trust, and President of the Victorian Division of the Australian Federation of Business and Professional Women.
