= Catholic sexual abuse scandal in Victoria =

The Catholic sexual abuse scandal in Victoria is part of the Catholic clerical sexual abuse in Australia and the much wider Catholic sexual abuse scandal in general, which involves charges, convictions, trials and ongoing investigations into allegations of sex crimes committed by Catholic priests and members of religious orders. The Catholic Church in Victoria has been implicated in a reported 40 suicides among about 620 sexual abuse victims acknowledged to the public after internal investigations by the Catholic Church in Victoria.

Following a preliminary 2012 police investigation, on 17 April 2012 the Government established the Inquiry into the Handling of Child Abuse by Religious and other Non-Government Organisations "to inquire into, consider and report to the Parliament on the processes by which religious and other non-government organisations respond to the criminal abuse of children by personnel within their organisations." The Inquiry tabled its report to Parliament on 13 November 2013 and the Government tabled its response to the Inquiry's recommendations on 8 May 2014.

== History of abuse ==
In April 2012, citing press reports that police were preparing a coronial brief on some 40 suicides linked to sexual abuse by clergy, the Archbishop of Melbourne, Denis Hart, said he thought "that Victoria Police should give the report to the Coroner. There needs to be a proper investigation of any suicides."

Shortly after press reports of the deaths based on a leaked police report written by Detective Sergeant Kevin Carson the Victorian government moved for the Family and Community Development Committee of the Victorian Parliament to investigate "into the handling of child abuse by religious and other non-government organisations." The committee commenced an inquiry into "the processes by which religious and other non-government organisations respond to the criminal abuse of children by personnel within their organisations". Archbishop Hart made a submission to the parliamentary committee on behalf of the leaders of the Catholic Church in Victoria, called Facing the Truth. In a preliminary statement it indicated that: "In the past 16 years, about 620 cases of criminal child abuse have been upheld by the Church in Victoria. Most claims relate to incidents from 30 and up to 80 years ago. The Church has received very few complaints of abuse that has taken place since 1990." Reasoning that because sexual abuse is rarely reported, campaign groups believe these numbers may represent only a fraction of the cases which actually occurred.

Regarding the inquiry, Shane Mackinlay, master of the Catholic Theological College in Melbourne, said, "Our submission [faces] the truth of those sort of numbers and the horrific extent and the horrific consequences for each of the victims represented by the numbers... Where there was absolutely dramatic and appalling rates of abuse in the 1970s and 1980s, that's dropped off extraordinarily." The submission to Parliament was not released in full.

Archbishop Hart made a statement about the "horrific abuse": "We look to this inquiry to assist the healing of those who have been abused, to examine the broad context of the church's response, especially over the last 16 years, and to make recommendations to enhance the care for victims and preventative measures that are now in place."

The Inquiry finished holding hearings in mid-2013 and tabled its report to Parliament on 13 November 2013 and the Government tabled its response to the Inquiry's recommendations on 8 May 2014. The Government supported all the recommendations of the Inquiry, some of them in principle and others of which had already been implemented.

In May 2020 newly disclosed portions of the Royal Commission into Institutional Responses to Child Sexual Abuse report, which was originally published in redacted form in December 2017, revealed that priests and clergy staff accused of abusing children within the Archdiocese of Melbourne were sometimes "dealt with" by being transferred to other parishes.

== Individual cases ==
- Michael Charles Glennon (13 May 1944 – 1 January 2014) - Glennon was sentenced to at least 15 years in jail for sexually abusing four Aboriginal boys between 1984 and 1991 Glennon died in prison on 1 January 2014, aged 69.
- Wilfred James Baker (1 July 1936 – 14 February 2014) - Baker was first sentenced on 8 June 1999 to four years, with parole after two, for sex crimes against eight boys, aged 10 to 13, between 1960 and 1979. Baker was scheduled to face further charges in 2014 involving more boys, but died before the hearing on 14 February 2014, aged 77.
- Michael Aulsebrook, who was convicted in a retrial for raping a 12-year-old boy in 1988, received a sentence on 7 and a half years in 2018 and will be eligible for parole four and half years in his sentence.
- In 2014 it was revealed that the Catholic Church in Australia concluded in 1997 that former priest Peter Searson sexually abusing both boys and girls when was teaching at Holy Family Parish Primary School in Doveton in Melbourne's south-east. However, the results of the investigation was not released to the public and Searson died in 2009 before he could face a criminal trial. Searson also showed hints of his aggressive behavior by using children's toilets and making his students watch him torture animals as well.
- Brother Tanson was found to have sexually abused Amber Louise while she resided at a Christian Brothers orphanage in Victoria in the 1970s. Despite belonging to a different order, Tanson was allowed to visit the orphanage on a regular basis. Tanson and an associate who was a Christian Brother were accused of abusing other children at the orphanage as well, though Louise"s case was the only one which was proven.
- Another case was David Edwin Rapson, who was jailed in 2013 for at least 13 years, with the possibility of parole after 10 years, for molesting 8 students at a Catholic school in Melbourne between 1973 and 1990.
- Frank Kelp was jailed for 10 and a half years in 2014 after he pleaded guilty to 15 sex offences involving many boys, including siblings at the school aged between 11 and 15, at the Salesian College Rupertswood between the 1970s and 1980s and will be eligible for parole six and a half years into his sentence.
- In September 2018 Marist Brother Gerald McNamara was sentenced to nine months in molested five boys athletes at St Paul's Catholic College in Traralgon, where he served as principal between 1970 and 1975. He abused one of these boys 30 times including one boy he abused some 30 times.
- Cardinal George Pell AC, a former Melbourne Archbishop and former high ranking Roman Curia official, was convicted in 2018 - a conviction that was subsequently overturned - of molesting two boys in the 1990s; and sentenced in 2019 to six years' imprisonment. In August 2019 the Victorian Court of Appeal rejected Pell's appeal to have his convictions overturned. Pell then sought leave to have the matter heard in the High Court; however, it was later revealed that he did serve all 405 days of his required prison sentence while awaiting appeal. Ballarat Bishop Paul Bird apologised for Pell's ties to the Diocese of Ballarat and for the history of sexual abuse in the Diocese of Ballarat as well. On 7 April 2020, Pell won his appeal with the Australian High Court, being unanimously acquitted and the convictions being quashed. The same day, Pell was released from prison after serving 13 months of the six-year prison sentence due to the County Court of Victoria conviction being overturned.

On 11 April 2020 Pell stated in an interview with Sky News journalist Andrew Bolt, which aired on Sky News Australia on 14 April 2020, that he was "ashamed" of the way the Catholic church handled sex abuse cases and that failures to act on the abuse, which he referred to as "cancer," still haunted him. He still denied committing the alleged Melbourne sex abuse, claiming "I don't know" why one of his alleged victims testified against him and even suggested that the alleged victim who testified may have been "used." On 16 April 2020 Pell was denied a reinstatement as Vice-Patron and club ambassador of the Richmond Football Club.

On 6 May 2020 it was revealed that the Royal Commission into Institutional Responses to Child Sexual Abuse had determined that Pell, who was serving as Archbishop of Melbourne in 1997, shielded Peter Searson from potential prosecution. In 2014, Helen Last, the former director of the Archdiocese of Melbourne's pastoral response office, alleged that in 1997, Pell blocked her from doing more to investigate the claims against Searson, telling her in letter "under control" and "there remains no need for any pro-active measures from your office", and then was removed her from her post one month later after she defied his order. On 7 May 2020, previously undisclosed details of the Royal Commission into Institutional Responses to Child Sexual Abuse report, which was first published in December 2017 with redacted edits, were made public and revealed that Pell neglected reports he received as Auxiliary Bishop of Melbourne that Searson sexually abused children that as early as 1989, also neglected reports which were used as evidence to mount a sex abuse investigation of Searson, which were his use of children's toilets and habit of torturing animals in front of his students.

- On 27 April 2020 the Archdiocese of Melbourne issued an apology for shielding Father Gerard Mulvale, who had sexually abused a girl named Stephanie Piper on at least eight occasions between 1975 and 1979. An investigation against Mulvale later started in 1993, during which the Archdiocese of Melbourne denied his guilt. In January 1994, Stephanie committed suicide at the age of 32. However, Mulvale was eventually convicted on 3 November 1995 of sexually abusing two boys. Stephanie's mother Eileen Piper has along been engaged in legal action against the Archdiocese of Melbourne as well.

== See also ==
- Roman Catholic Diocese of Ballarat#Child sexual abuse
- Catholic sexual abuse scandal in Australia
- Royal Commission into Institutional Responses to Child Sexual Abuse
- Child sexual abuse
- Catholic sex abuse cases
- Sexual misconduct
- Southwell inquiry
