= Juan Antonio Guerrero Alves =

Spanish Jesuit priest (born 1959)

The Reverend Juan Antonio Guerrero Alves S.J.
- Prefect of the Secretariat for the Economy
- Church: Roman Catholic Church
- Appointed: 14 November 2019
- Installed: 1 January 2020
- Term ended: 30 November 2022
- Predecessor: George Pell
- Successor: Maximino Caballero Ledo

Orders
- Ordination: 30 May 1992

Personal details
- Born: Juan Antonio Guerrero Alves; 20 April 1959 (age 67) Mérida, Spain
- Education: Autonomous University of Madrid; Comillas Pontifical University; Boston College

Juan Antonio Guerrero Alves, S.J. (born 20 April 1959), is a Spanish Jesuit priest who served as the prefect of the Vatican's Secretariat for the Economy from 1 January 2020 to 30 November 2022. He previously taught at the university level and held administrative positions within the Jesuit order.

== Life and career ==
Juan Antonio Guerrero Alves was born on 20 April 1959 in Mérida, Spain, the second of four brothers. After beginning college to study economics following the career path of his father, a businessman, he entered the novitiate of the Society of Jesus in 1979. He was ordained a priest on 30 May 1992. He earned a licentiate in economics at the Autonomous University of Madrid in 1986 and a licentiate in philosophy and letters there in 1993. He studied theology in Belo Horizonte, Brazil, and Lyon, France, and obtained a licentiate in theology from the Comillas Pontifical University in 1994. He studied political philosophy at Boston College in 1998–1999.

He served as professor of social and political philosophy at the Comillas Pontifical University from 1994 to 1997 and from 1999 to 2003. His academic publications include many articles in social and political philosophy and on Ignatian spirituality as well. For the Jesuits he was master of novices in Spain from 2003 to 2008, provincial superior of the province of Castilla from 2008 to 2014, treasurer of the Society of Jesus in Mozambique from 2015 to 2017, and director of Saint Ignatius of Loyola secondary school in Tete, Mozambique, for the year 2016-2017, its first year. Beginning in 2017 he served as delegate of the superior general in Rome for interprovincial homes and works and as general counsellor of the Society of Jesus, where he had administrative and budgeting responsibilities for the Pontifical Gregorian University and Biblical Institute, the Oriental Institute, the Vatican Observatory, Vatican Radio, and some student residences and guest houses. He has led numerous retreats, including one for the bishops of Spain in January 2019.

On 14 November 2019, Pope Francis named him prefect of the Secretariate for the Economy, effective 1 January 2020. Although when Pope Francis created that position he established that it should be held by a cardinal, and therefore normally a bishop, he agreed to allow Guerrero Alves to remain a priest so that he could return to ordinary assignments as a Jesuit when his curial service ends.

On 30 November 2022, his resignation for personal reasons was announced.
