= Southwell inquiry =

The Southwell inquiry was an investigation by AJ Southwell, a former Australian judge, into sexual abuse in the Roman Catholic Archdiocese of Melbourne, specifically allegations that in 1961 George Pell, then a seminarian and later Archbishop of Sydney, had abused a 12-year-old boy, now a 53-year-old man who could not be named, at a Roman Catholic youth camp.

== An inquiry, but not an inquisition ==
Hon AJ Southwell, QC, a retired judge and an Anglican, was appointed a commissioner by the National Committee for Professional Standards (NCPS), the church's internal process for dealing with allegations of sexual misconduct, to conduct an inquiry into the allegations. The commissioner stated that it was "an inquiry, not an adversarial process in which the complainant bears the onus of proof. However, my task, as set out in the Terms of Reference, is to decide 'whether or not the complaint has been established'". Since the allegations "amounted to the crime of indecent assault, which, at that time [1961-62] was punishable by imprisonment for a term of up to 10 years Crimes Act 1958, s.68 et al.", the level of proof must be high.

== Allegations dating back to 1975 ==
The complainant claimed to have first made the allegations to his wife around 1975. Southwell says: "As to motive, ... extensive enquiries made on behalf of the respondent (Pell) have unearthed no evidence of any other matter or incident which might have aroused spite or malice on the part of the complainant towards either the respondent or the Church. On the other hand, the respondent has had a strong motive to push memory (if there ever was memory) of these fleeting incidents by a 19 year old into the recesses of the mind, from which there could be no recall." Southwell found no evidence that the complaint was made through vindictiveness or desire for compensation.

== Lack of credibility and evidence from the accuser ==
Southwell concluded: "I accept as correct the submissions of Mr Tovey [for the complainant] that the complainant, when giving evidence of molesting, gave the impression that he was speaking honestly from an actual recollection. However, the respondent, also, gave me the impression that he was speaking the truth. ... In the end, and notwithstanding that impression of the complainant, bearing in mind the forensic difficulties of the defence occasioned by the very long delay, some valid criticism of the complainant's credibility, the lack of corroborative evidence and the sworn denial of the respondent, I find I am not 'satisfied that the complaint has been established', to quote the words of the principal term of reference."

== Doubts about the handling of the accusation ==
Doubts about the handling of the accusation arose following the publication by the Australian Herald Sun on 6 October 2002 of details about the accuser, whose anonymity had been preserved in previous media coverage. As relayed by the Zenit news service, "Pell's alleged victim was, it turned out, a career criminal. He had been convicted of drug dealing and involved in illegal gambling, tax evasion and organized crime in a labor union. A commission probing the corrupt union even devoted a whole chapter of its report to this man's activities. As the inquiry report noted: 'The complainant has been before the court on many occasions, resulting in 39 convictions from about 20 court appearances.'"
