= Cathy Kezelman =

Australian mental health worker

Cathy Kezelman is an Australian former mental health worker.

== Career ==
In her autobiographical book Innocence Revisited, she said that she had managed to recover her memories of her father and grandmother sadistically sexually abusing her. She wrote that, while in a therapy session, "The process of recovering these memories made me more fragile than ever". In response to the book, her brother Claud Imhoff, a social worker, said that "I can categorically state that those events never happened", and said that she had "simply ignored the professional guidelines and not mentioned anything about the dangers of false memories" in the book.

Kezelman has worked as the head of Adults Surviving Child Abuse and the Blue Knot Foundation.
