= Joseph Glennon =

English cricketer and footballer

Teddy Glennon
Personal information
- Full name: Joseph Edward Glennon
- Date of birth: 17 October 1889
- Place of birth: Whitwick, England
- Date of death: 26 June 1926 (aged 36)
- Place of death: Sheffield, England
- Position: Inside forward

Senior career*
Years	Team	Apps	(Gls)
1906–1907	Kilnhurst Town		
1907–1909	Grimsby Town	10	(0)
1909–1910	Denaby United		
1910–1914	The Wednesday	121	(41)
1919–1921	Rotherham County	65	(17)
1921–192?	Rotherham Town		
- * Club domestic league appearances and goals

Joseph Edward Glennon (17 October 1889 – 26 June 1926) was an English professional footballer and cricketer.

He was born in Whitwick and died in Sheffield. As a cricketer he was active in 1921 and played for Leicestershire. He appeared in two first-class matches and scored twelve runs with a highest score of 7. He was also a professional footballer and played as an inside forward for Sheffield Wednesday.
