= Mandelbaum House =

Mandelbaum House in Sydney, Australia, is a Jewish residential college open to both men and women, regardless of religion or nationality, affiliated with the University of Sydney. The college accommodates approximately 38 residents, mainly undergraduate and postgraduate students, as well as visiting academics. Opened on 18 February 1996 on a site donated by the University of Sydney, it is the youngest college on campus.

== Location ==
Mandelbaum House is located on the Darlington side of the main campus at the University of Sydney.

== History ==
The founder of the College, Mrs Rachel Lipton (née Mandelbaum) died in March 1978, aged 81. In 1918, she graduated with a BA from the University of Sydney, where she read Latin, English, History, Philosophy and Chemistry. She then taught Latin and English at several schools and subsequently obtained her MA in Latin from the University of Sydney in 1934. Mrs Lipton bequeathed her estate for the construction of a college at the University of Sydney, which would be named Mandelbaum House. The college was established in memory of her parents, the Reverend Zalel and Freda Mandelbaum, who had provided spiritual leadership to a number of Australian congregations over many decades. Her second husband, Mr Harry Lipton, subsequently bequeathed his estate for Mandelbaum House as well. Mandelbaum House opened on 18 February 1996 on a site donated by The University of Sydney.

== Jewish learning ==
Under the terms of Mrs Lipton’s bequest, the college is intended not merely to be a place of residence for students and scholars, but also to be a focal point for Jewish studies in Australia, and for the study of Judaic thought throughout history. In keeping to this ethos Mandelbaum House hosts seminars and lectures given by prominent scholars and members of the Jewish and university community. Throughout the academic year visiting scholars from various disciplines stay on site at Mandelbaum in guest apartments.

== Social calendar ==
=== Formal dinners ===
Mandelbaum House hosts formal dinners throughout the semester for residents and guest speakers are invited to give a talk to the residents. Previous guest speakers include:

- Professor Earl Owen – microsurgeon.
- Ronni Kahn - Founder of food rescue charity, OzHarvest. Recipient of the 2010 Local Hero Award.
- Brian Schwarz - Chairman of Insurance Australia Group Limited, Deputy Chairman of Football Federation Australia Limited.
- Edward Fernon – Australian athlete in the 2012 Summer Olympics in modern pentathlon.
- Eddie Jaku – Holocaust survivor.
- Professor Bryan Gaensler – astronomer and Young Australian of the Year (1999).
- Professor Lisa Jackson Pulver - First Indigenous person to receive a PhD in medicine from the University of Sydney.

=== Alumni reunions ===
Mandelbaum House has an active alumnus that arranges reunions and events.
