= Saint John's Tower (Vatican City) =

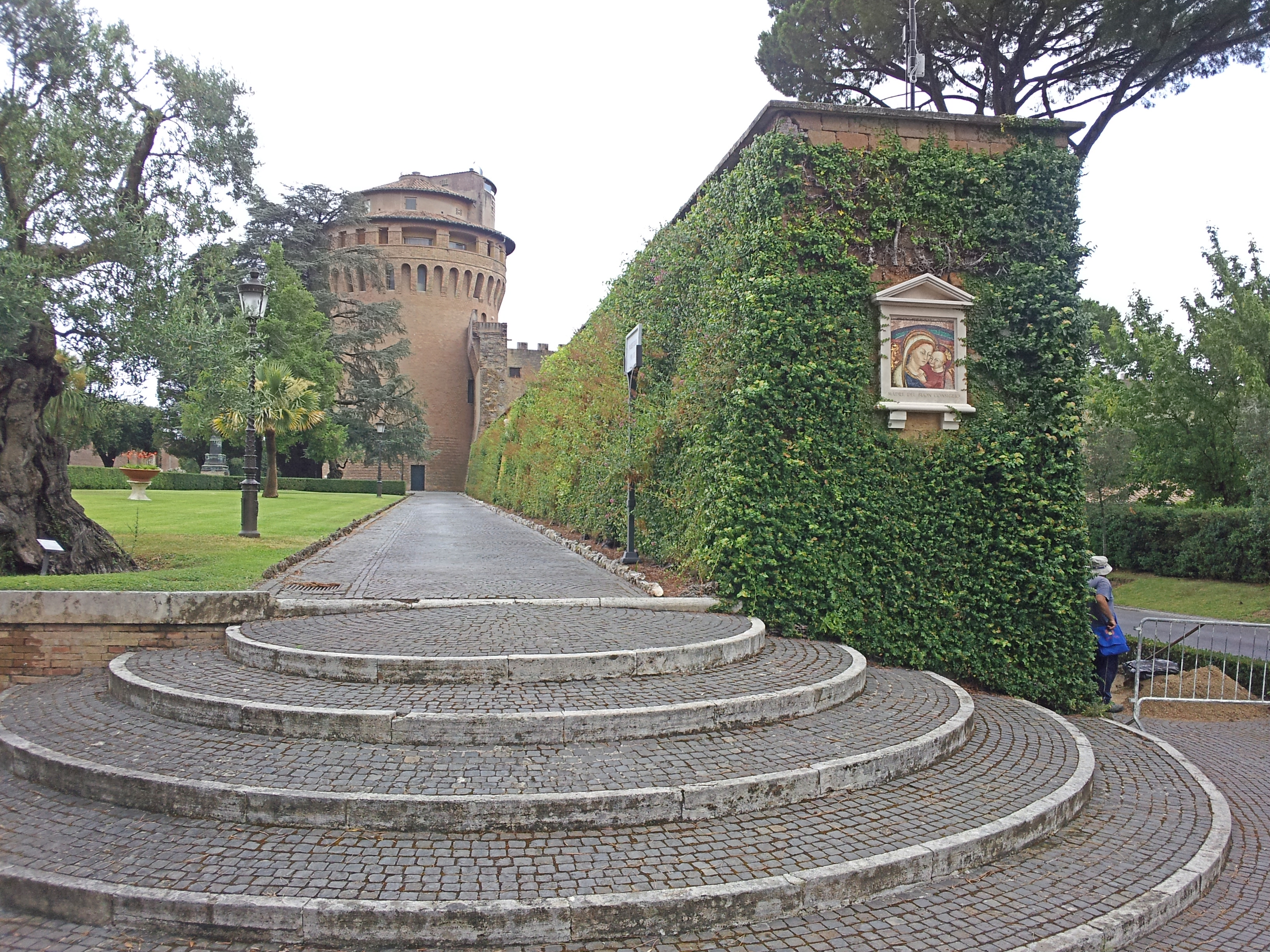
- Saint John's Tower is the round structure in the background of the picture.
- Click on the map to see marker

General information
- Location: Vatican City
- Coordinates: 41°54′05.57″N 012°26′51.34″E

Saint John's Tower (Italian: Torre San Giovanni) is a round structure located on a hilltop in the westernmost tip of Vatican City, near Vatican Radio and overlooking the Vatican Gardens. The medieval tower is located along an ancient wall built by Pope Nicholas III, but it fell into disuse at the beginning of the 16th century. It was rebuilt by Pope John XXIII in the early 1960s.

In modern times, the Tower houses papal apartments used by popes when maintenance work is being done on the Apostolic Palace and also is reserved for illustrious guests of the Pontiffs. In 1979, Pope John Paul II temporarily moved into Torre San Giovanni while the work in his official apartment was being completed. In 1971, Hungarian Cardinal József Mindszenty was allowed to stay in the tower by Pope Paul VI, when the prelate was allowed to leave Budapest, where he had lived in asylum at the U.S. Embassy. After Cardinal Tarcisio Bertone replaced Cardinal Angelo Sodano as Vatican Secretary of State in 2006, Cardinal Bertone lived in the tower while Cardinal Sodano continued to live in the official residence.

In June 2008, the Vatican announced that Pope Benedict XVI would welcome U.S. President George W. Bush in the Torre San Giovanni during the American President's visit to the Vatican that month, to repay Bush for the warm reception the Pope enjoyed at the White House during his April 2008 visit to the United States of America. Normally the Pope greets heads of state in his private library in the Apostolic Palace.

Currently, Saint John's Tower is the seat of the Secretariat for the Economy.

== See also ==
- Index of Vatican City-related articles
