= Michael Glennon (former priest) =

Australian laicised Catholic priest and sex offender (1944–2014)

- Born: Michael Charles Glennon; 13 May 1944; Preston, Victoria, Australia
- Died: 1 January 2014 (aged 69); Hopkins Correctional Centre, Ararat, Australia
- Occupation: Priest
- Known for: Abuse of children
- Allegiance: Catholic Church
- Criminal charge: Child molester
- Penalty: 33 ½ years imprisonment with a non-parole period of 26 ½ years

Michael Charles Glennon (13 May 1944 – 1 January 2014) was an Australian convicted child molester and former Roman Catholic priest, the subject of one of the most notorious clergy sex abuse cases in Australia. Glennon ran a youth camp in Lancefield, Victoria, where most of the abuse took place.

Glennon was convicted of sexually abusing 15 children in court cases spanning 25 years and was serving a 33½ year prison term with a non-parole period of 26½ years. Glennon died in prison on 1 January 2014, aged 69.

== Life ==
Glennon was born in Preston, a working-class suburb of Melbourne, one of 10 siblings.

In 1971, he was ordained to the priesthood and was an assistant priest at St Monica's in Moonee Ponds, where he and his Labrador Retriever were popular with "hundreds" of children. He soon launched his youth camp, Karaglen, on 16 hectares of bushland outside of Lancefield. Over the years, it would grow from tents to a few huts and a hall with a private bedroom for Glennon. Billed as the Peaceful Hand Youth Foundation, it centred on a mix of karate (Glennon claimed to have a black belt) and Catholic liturgy.

Glennon transferred in 1977 to St Gabriel's in Reservoir, Victoria, but left after a year. In 1979, the church withdrew his right to be an active priest, but had no control over his activities at the camp. In 1998, he was formally laicised by the church. The church claims that defamation law prevented them from acting to expose him. Glennon continued to preach, ministering to a congregation from his home in Thornbury. The congregation included poor and Aboriginal families.

Glennon's charisma and religious devotion endeared him to many parents, who allowed their children to go with Glennon on overnight trips or even sleep in his bed, many years after his first charges. Children invited to these assignations suspected nothing and many long kept their silence. A victim testified in 1986 that Glennon said he had "lost count" of the children he had assaulted.

== Trials ==
In 1978 Glennon was convicted of indecently assaulting a 10-year-old girl. He was sentenced to two years in prison, and served seven months before being paroled; he continued to run the camp, where he was often the only adult present.

In 1984 he was acquitted of raping two boys, aged 11 and 13. In 1985 Glennon was charged with raping five boys and one girl, aged 12 to 16, all of them visitors to his camp during 1978–80. The trial was delayed by several years due to the publication of Glennon's prior conviction by Derryn Hinch. He was prosecuted by Crown Prosecutor Meryl Sexton, later appointed a Judge of the County Court of Victoria. In 1991, Glennon was found guilty of five charges including indecent assault, attempted buggery of a boy under 14 years, and buggery with violence.

He appealed his own conviction to the High Court, which found that despite the publicity, the trial was not unfair. The ruling overturned an acquittal by the Court of Criminal Appeal, and Glennon was sent to prison for seven years with a five-year minimum.

In 1999, Glennon was convicted on 24 further charges. These convictions were only made public after his final conviction in October 2003, where Glennon was found guilty of another 23 offences against children, including rape, indecent assault, gross indecency, sexually penetrating a child under the age of 16 and sexually penetrating a child under the age of 10. These assaults took place between 1986 and 1991, while he was free during the litigation of his case and that of Derryn Hinch. He was sentenced to an effective total of 22 years in jail with a minimum of 15 years; he was described as "evil and callous" by the sentencing judge, to applause from the victims and their supporters.

== Death ==
Glennon was found dead in his cell at Hopkins Correctional Centre in Ararat, Victoria, on 1 January 2014. Aged 69, he is believed to have died of natural causes. He would have been eligible for parole in 2018.

== See also ==
- Catholic sexual abuse scandal in Victoria
